= List of Belgian football transfers summer 2026 =

This is a list of Belgian football transfers for the 2026 summer transfer window. Only transfers involving teams from the professional divisions are listed, including the 18 teams in the Belgian Pro League and the 15 teams in the Challenger Pro League.

The summer transfer window will open on 1 July 2026, although some transfers were announced before that date. Players without a club may join one at any time, either during or in between transfer windows. The transfer window ends at the end of August, although a few completed transfers could still be announced a few days later.

== Sorted by team ==
=== Belgian Pro League teams ===
==== Anderlecht ====
In:

No.	Pos.	Nation	Player
—	MF	NOR	Thelo Aasgaard (on loan from Rangers)
—	MF	CIV	Romeo Amane (from Rapid Wien)
—	MF	CZE	Lukáš Ambros (from Górnik Zabrze)
—	MF	FIN	Oliver Antman (from Rangers)
—	DF	BEL	Kaïs Barry (promoted from RSCA Futures)
—	FW	MAR	Tawfik Bentayeb (from UTS Rabat)
—	DF	FRA	Giulian Biancone (from Olympiacos)
—	GK	BEL	Michiel Haentjens (promoted from RSCA Futures)
—	DF	GER	Zoumana Keita (promoted from RSCA Futures)
—	MF	GRE	Ilias Koutsoupias (from Frosinone)
—	MF	BEL	Joshua Nga Kana (promoted from RSCA Futures)
—	MF	BEL	Noa Ojea (promoted from RSCA Futures)
—	DF	IRL	Andrew Omobamidele (on loan from Strasbourg)
—	FW	BEL	Jayden Onia Seke (promoted from RSCA Futures)
—	DF	FRA	Léo Pétrot (from Elche)
—	DF	MDA	Oleg Reabciuk (from Spartak Moscow)
—	MF	GER	Marten Winkler (from Hertha BSC)

Out:

No.	Pos.	Nation	Player
4	DF	FRA	Mathys Angély (loan return to VfL Wolfsburg)
10	MF	BEL	Yari Verschaeren (to Sampdoria)
11	MF	BEL	Thorgan Hazard (released to Lens)
13	MF	CAN	Nathan Saliba (to Villarreal)
15	DF	SRB	Mihajlo Ilić (loan return to Bologna)
21	MF	MEX	César Huerta (to UNAM)
23	MF	BEL	Mats Rits (to Beerschot)
62	DF	BEL	Basile Vroninks (to Kortrijk)
74	MF	BEL	Nathan De Cat (to TSG Hoffenheim)
77	DF	ESP	Coba da Costa (loan return to Getafe)
78	MF	MAR	Anas Tajaouart (on loan to La Louvière)
93	DF	MLI	Moussa Diarra (loan return to Alavés)
99	MF	MLI	Ibrahim Kanaté (on loan to 1. FC Kaiserslautern)
—	MF	GHA	Majeed Ashimeru (was on loan to La Louvière, then released)
—	FW	JPN	Keisuke Gotō (was on loan to Sint-Truiden, now sold to SC Freiburg)
—	MF	NED	Cedric Hatenboer (was on loan to Telstar, now sold to Sparta Rotterdam)
—	DF	SEN	Moussa N'Diaye (was on loan to Schalke 04, now loaned to SV Werder Bremen)
—	DF	SRB	Jan-Carlo Simić (was on loan to Al-Ittihad, now sold)
—	FW	ARG	Luis Vázquez (was on loan to Getafe, now sold to Birmingham City)

==== Antwerp ====
In:

No.	Pos.	Nation	Player
—	MF	JPN	Koki Ando (from Mito HollyHock)
—	MF	ARG	Mauricio Benítez (was on loan from Boca Juniors, now bought)
—	DF	BEL	Maxime Busi (from Reims)
—	DF	ESP	Álvaro Cortés (from Barcelona)
—	MF	MTN	Bahmed Deuff (on loan from Nantes)
—	FW	SUI	Michael Frey (from Grasshopper Club Zurich)
—	FW	BEL	Jeff Godelaine (promoted from Young Reds)
—	MF	ECU	Carlos Mejía (from Kustošija)
—	FW	GHA	Luis Narh (from Diamond Seed)
—	FW	ECU	Snayder Porozo (from Aucas)
—	FW	MAR	Ibrahim Salah (on loan from Basel)
—	DF	BEL	Luca Schelfhout (promoted from Young Reds)
—	DF	BEL	Eran Tuypens (promoted from Young Reds)
—	MF	BEL	Louie Van Gelder (promoted from Young Reds)
—	MF	BEL	Arthur Vermeeren (on loan from RB Leipzig)

Out:

No.	Pos.	Nation	Player
2	DF	BEL	Kobe Corbanie (to Mechelen)
3	DF	BEL	Björn Engels (end of contract)
6	MF	COD	Jules Ahoka (to Sunderland)
7	FW	SUR	Gyrano Kerk (to Erzurumspor)
7	FW	ECU	Anthony Valencia (to Flamengo)
8	DF	BEL	Dennis Praet (to Mechelen)
9	MF	KSA	Marwan Al-Sahafi (loan return to Al-Ittihad)
10	MF	NED	Isaac Babadi (loan return to PSV Eindhoven)
11	MF	BEL	Geoffry Hairemans (to Hasselt)
18	FW	NED	Vincent Janssen (to Portland Timbers)
18	FW	BEL	Gerard Vandeplas (on loan to Dender EH)
21	MF	BEL	Andreas Verstraeten (on loan to VVV-Venlo)
23	DF	NED	Glenn Bijl (end of contract)
25	DF	MLI	Kiki Kouyaté (to Al-Khaleej)
33	DF	BEL	Zeno Van Den Bosch (to Union Berlin)
34	MF	FRA	Mahamadou Diawara (loan return to Lyon)
92	FW	NGR	Gabriel Jesus David (on loan to SKN St. Pölten)

==== Beveren ====
In:

No.	Pos.	Nation	Player
—	MF	GUI	Cheick Condé (from Venezia)
—	GK	BEL	Milan De Schutter (from Hoogstraten)
—	DF	FRA	Yoni Gomis (again on loan from Strasbourg)
—	FW	BFA	Elohim Kaboré (on loan from Hammarby)
—	DF	CMR	Stephane Keller (on loan from Al-Ittihad)
—	DF	MLI	Cheick Oumar Konaté (from Clermont Foot)
—	MF	BEL	Léandre Kuavita (from Standard Liège)
—	FW	NGR	Victor Olatunji (on loan from Real Salt Lake)
—	DF	AUT	Jannik Robatsch (on loan from FC St. Pauli)
—	GK	GER	Johannes Schenk (on loan from Preußen Münster)
—	MF	BEL	Tibe s'Jongers (promoted from Beveren U21)
—	DF	ENG	Dominic Thompson (from Kilmarnock)
—	MF	BEL	Arno Verschueren (from Twente)

Out:

No.	Pos.	Nation	Player
1	GK	NED	Beau Reus (to Heart of Midlothian)
6	MF	BEL	Dante Rigo (released)
15	FW	NED	Jesse van de Haar (loan return to Utrecht)
20	DF	BEL	Dylan Dassy (to Lierse)
25	DF	CIV	Abdul Aziz Ouedraogo (loan return to Crystal Palace)
77	FW	TUR	Hüseyin Ertürk (released to Patro Eisden Maasmechelen)
78	MF	BEL	Jannes Van Hecke (to NAC Breda)

==== Cercle Brugge ====
In:

No.	Pos.	Nation	Player
—	DF	IRL	Tayo Adaramola (from Crystal Palace)
—	FW	NGR	Tunde Akinsola (from AVS)
—	GK	BEL	Gaëtan Coucke (from Sampdoria)
—	DF	CIV	Valy Konaté (again on loan from Monaco)
—	MF	CIV	Jean Thierry Lazare (from Kifisia)
—	MF	RSA	Luke Le Roux (from Portsmouth)
—	GK	FRA	Yann Lienard (on loan from Monaco)
—	DF	BRA	Yago Lincoln (from Londrina)
—	MF	GAM	Abdoulie Manneh (on loan from Mjällby)
—	MF	FRA	Lucas Michal (on loan from Monaco)
—	MF	BEL	Lukas Mondele (from Francs Borains)
—	MF	ENG	Joel Ndala (from Manchester City)
—	FW	BEL	Dante Vanzeir (again on loan from Gent)

Out:

No.	Pos.	Nation	Player
1	GK	BRA	Warleson (to Botafogo)
6	MF	GHA	Lawrence Agyekum (on loan to Erzurumspor)
10	FW	CIV	Oumar Diakité (loan return to Reims)
17	MF	AUT	Oluwaseun Adewumi (loan return to Burnley)
18	MF	BEL	Pieter Gerkens (loan return to Gent)
19	MF	FRA	Ibrahima Diaby (to Al-Ahli)
20	DF	POR	Flávio Nazinho (to Monaco)
21	GK	BEL	Maxime Delanghe (on loan to Willem II)
23	FW	MEX	Heriberto Jurado (on loan to Puebla)
27	MF	BEL	Nils De Wilde (to Eendracht Aalst Lede)
37	MF	FRA	Edan Diop (loan return to Monaco)
66	DF	BEL	Christiaan Ravych (to Genk)
—	FW	BEL	Alama Bayo (was on loan to Lokeren, now demoted to Jong Cercle)
—	DF	FRA	Dalangunypole Gomis (again on loan to Sochaux)
—	DF	BEL	Jonas Lietaert (was on loan to Lokeren, now sold)
—	DF	BEL	Beni Mpanzu (was on loan to Hasselt, now sold to Dordrecht)

==== Charleroi ====
In:

No.	Pos.	Nation	Player
—	FW	GAM	Adama Bojang (on loan from Reims)
—	MF	CIV	Isaac Cissé (from Golden Arrows)
—	GK	BEL	Arthur Cremer (from Virton)
—	MF	FRA	Boubakar Dembaga (from Monaco)
—	MF	FRA	Freddy Mbemba (loan return from Guingamp)
—	FW	JPN	Gaku Nawata (on loan from Gamba Osaka)
—	DF	BEL	Naël Piron (promoted from Zébra Élites)
—	DF	ENG	Triston Rowe (on loan from Aston Villa)
—	DF	BEL	Noah Solheid (from Seraing)
—	DF	ALG	Kevin Van Den Kerkhof (was on loan from Metz, buy clause activated)

Out:

No.	Pos.	Nation	Player
5	MF	FRA	Etienne Camara (to Panathinaikos)
7	FW	BEL	Isaac Mbenza (to Al-Yarmouk)
9	FW	POL	Filip Szymczak (loan return to Lech Poznań)
10	MF	CIV	Parfait Guiagon (to Al Taawoun)
22	MF	ALG	Yacine Titraoui (to Lens)
23	MF	FRA	Jules Gaudin (to Laval)
27	DF	SWE	Lewin Blum (loan return to Young Boys)
32	DF	MAR	Mehdi Boukamir (on loan to La Louvière)
33	GK	BEL	Théo Defourny (released to RWDM Brussels)
43	FW	BEL	Quentin Benaets (released to La Louvière)
50	DF	BEL	Robin Denuit (released to Lokeren)
60	GK	BEL	Nicolas Closset (to Virton)
—	FW	GHA	Raymond Asante (was on loan to Patro Eisden Maasmechelen, now loaned to Francs Borains)
—	FW	BEL	Anthony Descotte (was on loan to Volendam, now loaned to Fortuna Sittard)
—	MF	BEL	Noam Mayoka-Tika (was on loan to Lierse, now sold)
—	MF	CIV	Severin Nioule (signed from Häcken, then on loan to Francs Borains)
—	FW	HAI	Mondy Prunier (was on loan to Francs Borains, now sold to Orléans)
—	MF	SLO	Žan Rogelj (was on loan to Wisła Płock, now sold)
—	FW	SRB	Slobodan Stanojlovic (was on loan to Francs Borains, then released to Radnik Bijeljina)

==== Club Brugge ====
In:

No.	Pos.	Nation	Player
—	DF	BEL	Matteo Dams (from Al-Ahli)
—	MF	SLO	Tian Nai Koren (promoted from Club NXT)
—	DF	KOR	Han-beom Lee (from Midtjylland)
—	MF	GER	Wisdom Mike (from Bayern Munich)
—	MF	ITA	Gianluca Okon (promoted from Club NXT)
—	MF	ENG	Freddie Potts (from West Ham United)
—	GK	SUI	Yann Sommer (from Inter Milan)
—	MF	SUI	Cheveyo Tsawa (from Zürich)
—	GK	BEL	Argus Vanden Driessche (promoted from Club NXT)
—	FW	SUI	Andrej Vasovic (from Luzern)
—	MF	ESP	Jan Virgili (from Mallorca)

Out:

No.	Pos.	Nation	Player
6	MF	NED	Ludovit Reis (to SV Werder Bremen)
8	MF	GRE	Christos Tzolis (to Arsenal)
11	MF	BEL	Cisse Sandra (to Westerlo)
14	DF	NED	Bjorn Meijer (to Sampdoria)
15	MF	NGR	Raphael Onyedika (to Eintracht Frankfurt)
16	GK	NED	Dani van den Heuvel (released to OH Leuven)
19	MF	SWE	Gustaf Nilsson (on loan to Hertha BSC)
22	GK	BEL	Simon Mignolet (retired)
24	MF	NGR	Vince Osuji (to Tromsø)
25	MF	SRB	Aleksandar Stanković (to Inter Milan)
84	MF	RSA	Shandre Campbell (to Kortrijk)
—	DF	ARG	Zaid Romero (was on loan to Getafe, now sold)

==== Genk ====
In:

No.	Pos.	Nation	Player
—	DF	URU	Kevin Amaro (from Liverpool)
—	FW	GHA	Jerry Afriyie (from Al Qadsiah)
—	DF	NGR	Christian Akpan (promoted from Jong Genk)
—	GK	BEL	Lucca Brughmans (sold to Liverpool, then returned on loan)
—	FW	NGR	Rafiu Durosinmi (from Pisa)
—	MF	DEN	Jeppe Erenbjerg (from Zulte Waregem)
—	MF	BEL	Kenan Haroun (promoted from Jong Genk)
—	GK	BEL	Tobe Leysen (from OH Leuven)
—	MF	BEL	Elie Mbavu (promoted from Jong Genk)
—	DF	BEL	Christiaan Ravych (from Cercle Brugge)
—	DF	MNE	Milan Roganović (from Partizan)
—	MF	BIH	Benjamin Tahirović (on loan from Brøndby)

Out:

No.	Pos.	Nation	Player
3	DF	ESP	Mujaid Sadick (on loan to Rayo Vallecano)
7	MF	BEL	Jarne Steuckers (on loan to VfL Bochum)
14	MF	NGR	Yira Sor (to Amedspor)
20	FW	GRE	Konstantinos Karetsas (to Borussia Dortmund)
29	FW	BEL	Robin Mirisola (on loan to OH Leuven)
71	GK	BEL	Brent Stevens (to Beerschot)
77	DF	MAR	Zakaria El Ouahdi (to Hamburger SV)
99	FW	SWE	Jusef Erabi (on loan to Preston North End)

==== Gent ====
In:

No.	Pos.	Nation	Player
—	FW	NGR	Abubakar Abdullahi (promoted from Jong KAA Gent)
—	FW	COD	Michel-Ange Balikwisha (on loan from Celtic)
—	MF	SVK	László Bénes (from Union Berlin)
—	DF	ENG	Christian Burgess (from Union SG)
—	FW	SEN	Ibrahima Cissé (promoted from Jong KAA Gent)
—	DF	BEL	Lars Cooman (from Knokke)
—	GK	BEL	Victor De Coninck (promoted from Jong KAA Gent)
—	DF	SEN	Mamadou Diallo (promoted from Jong KAA Gent)
—	MF	BEL	Pieter Gerkens (loan return from Cercle Brugge)
—	DF	SEN	El Bachir Ngom (from Grasshopper Club Zurich)
—	MF	SEN	El Hadji Seck (promoted from Jong KAA Gent)
—	FW	PAN	Josué Vergara (from Auda)
—	DF	ENG	Kyrell Wilson (from Swansea City)

Out:

No.	Pos.	Nation	Player
4	DF	JPN	Daiki Hashioka (loan return to Slavia Prague)
7	FW	CIV	Wilfried Kanga (to Al Fateh)
8	MF	POL	Michał Skóraś (to Lens)
15	MF	JPN	Atsuki Itō (to Bolton Wanderers)
19	FW	SEN	Moctar Diop (demoted to Jong KAA Gent)
24	FW	KOR	Hong Hyun-seok (loan return to 1. FSV Mainz 05)
25	DF	MAR	Hatim Es-Saoubi (on loan to Volos)
29	DF	HAI	Jean-Kévin Duverne (loan return to Nantes)
39	DF	BFA	Abdoul Ayinde (demoted to Jong KAA Gent)
62	MF	BEL	Wout Asselman (on loan to Cambuur)
—	DF	ANG	Núrio Fortuna (loan return from Volos, then released to Petro de Luanda)
—	FW	CAF	Hugo Gambor (was on loan to Troyes, now sold to Académico de Viseu)
—	DF	CMR	Samuel Kotto (was on loan to Reims, now sold)
—	FW	BEL	Dante Vanzeir (again on loan to Cercle Brugge)
—	MF	JPN	Daisuke Yokota (was on loan to Hannover 96, buy clause activated)

==== Kortrijk ====
In:

No.	Pos.	Nation	Player
—	MF	RSA	Shandre Campbell (from Club Brugge)
—	DF	FRA	Axel Drouhin (from Annecy)
—	FW	CAF	Goduine Koyalipou (on loan from Lens)
—	DF	BEL	Boris Lambert (was on loan from Willem II, now bought)
—	MF	BEL	Guust Lamerand (promoted from Kortrijk U21)
—	FW	JPN	Ken Masui (on loan from Nagoya Grampus)
—	DF	CHI	Nayel Mehssatou (from Standard Liège)
—	DF	ENG	Harrison Murray-Campbell (on loan from Chelsea)
—	MF	ISR	Suf Podgoreanu (from Maccabi Haifa)
—	MF	SWE	Jamie Roche (from Lausanne-Sport)
—	MF	SLO	Rok Štorman (on loan from Karviná)
—	DF	BEL	Basile Vroninks (from Anderlecht)

Out:

No.	Pos.	Nation	Player
2	DF	SEN	Mouhamed Guèye (to HJK Helsinki)
7	FW	BEL	Ilan Hurtevent (to Union SG)
8	MF	BEL	Youssef Challouk (end of contract)
9	FW	IRL	Jonathan Afolabi (to Shamrock Rovers)
11	MF	HUN	Csanád Dénes (to Debrecen)
21	MF	RSA	Cassius Mailula (loan return to Toronto)
25	MF	BEL	Manuel Osifo (loan return to OH Leuven)
39	FW	MAD	Bryan Adinany (on loan to Debrecen)
43	FW	BEL	Ilian Temperman (to Jong Cercle)
49	DF	BEL	Fuhna Wirsiy Nsolo (to Voždovac)
—	MF	FRA	Mohamed Boussadia (was on loan to Knokke, now sold to Monastir)
—	FW	BEL	Kyan Himpe (was on loan to Roeselare, now loaned to Lierse)

==== La Louvière ====
In:

No.	Pos.	Nation	Player
—	FW	BEL	Quentin Benaets (from Charleroi)
—	DF	MAR	Mehdi Boukamir (on loan from Charleroi)
—	MF	MLI	Ismaila Coulibaly (from LASK)
—	MF	FRA	Marius Courcoul (on loan from Angers)
—	DF	FRA	Shaquil Delos (from Grenoble)
—	FW	FRA	Elias Filet (from Aarau)
—	DF	FRA	Siad Gourville (from Boulogne)
—	FW	HUN	Zsombor Gruber (from Ferencváros)
—	MF	NGR	Mustapha Isah (from Kristiansund)
—	FW	BEL	Timéo Kerckhofs (promoted from La Louvière U21)
—	MF	HUN	Mátyás Kovács (from MTK Budapest)
—	DF	GER	Patrick Nkoa (from Eintracht Braunschweig)
—	GK	LUX	Tiago Pereira Cardoso (on loan from Borussia Mönchengladbach)
—	GK	BEL	Théo Radelet (from OH Leuven)
—	FW	BEL	Léandro Rousseau (from Patro Eisden Maasmechelen)
—	MF	MAR	Anas Tajaouart (on loan from Anderlecht)
—	MF	SEN	Mame Wade (from Austria Lustenau)

Out:

No.	Pos.	Nation	Player
1	GK	BEL	Célestin De Schrevel (to Virton)
6	MF	FRA	Alexis Beka Beka (to Aarau)
7	FW	SEN	Pape Moussa Fall (loan return to Metz)
8	MF	RWA	Samuel Gueulette (to UTA Arad)
11	DF	BDI	Jordi Liongola (to Sheffield Wednesday)
13	DF	FRA	Maxence Maisonneuve (to Wisła Kraków)
15	MF	BEL	Sami Lahssaini (to Patro Eisden Maasmechelen)
18	MF	GHA	Majeed Ashimeru (loan return to Anderlecht)
19	DF	ESP	Darío Benavides (to Dinamo București)
22	FW	GHA	Jerry Afriyie (loan return to Al Qadsiah)
26	DF	FRA	Matthis Riou (released)
27	FW	BEL	Nachon Nsingi (to Rodez)
29	FW	GEQ	Cristian Makaté (loan return to Union SG)
98	MF	FRA	Owen Maës (end of contract)
—	MF	BEL	Thierno Diallo (was on loan to Olympic Charleroi, then end of contract)
—	FW	NED	Raphaël Eyongo (loan return from Olympic Charleroi, then retired)
—	FW	MLI	Mohamed Guindo (was on loan to Clermont Foot, now sold to Aarau)
—	DF	BEL	Luka Hoedaert (was on loan to Tubize-Braine, now sold to Rochefort)
—	DF	BEL	Tristan Loiseaux (was on loan to Stockay, now sold to Onhaye)

==== Lommel ====
In:

No.	Pos.	Nation	Player
—	MF	FRA	Stredair Appuah (on loan from Palermo)
—	MF	BEL	Niek Corthouts (promoted from Jong Lommel)
—	MF	ENG	Isaiah Dada-Mascoll (on loan from Manchester City U-21s and Academy)
—	DF	NED	Sam de Grand (sold to AZ Alkmaar, then returned on loan)
—	DF	NED	Tristan Gooijer (from Ajax)
—	MF	SRB	Đorđe Gordić (loan return from Debrecen)
—	FW	NED	Don-Angelo Konadu (on loan from Ajax)
—	MF	NOR	Sverre Nypan (on loan from Manchester City)
—	FW	NGR	Elijah Odede (on loan from Troyes)
—	MF	FIN	Juho Talvitie (loan return from NAC Breda)

Out:

No.	Pos.	Nation	Player
4	DF	BEL	Rubin Seigers (demoted to Jong Lommel)
11	FW	HUN	Zalán Vancsa (to Sirius)
11	FW	NED	Robin van Duiven (loan return to PSV)
18	MF	ARG	Lautaro López (loan return to Montevideo City)
19	MF	BEL	Théo Mununga (on loan to Knokke)
27	MF	CRO	Leon Lalić (released)
51	MF	COD	Nils Nieki (to RWDM Brussels)
57	DF	BEL	Filip Kujović (end of contract)
64	DF	NGR	Dominion Ohaka (loan return to Water FC)
80	FW	SRB	Filip Stevanović (end of contract)
98	FW	BEL	Mo Salah (to Casa Pia)
99	DF	PER	Kluiverth Aguilar (released to MNUFC2)
—	MF	TOG	Dermane Karim (was on loan to Lorient, now sold to Troyes)
—	MF	BUL	Filip Krastev (was on loan to Göztepe, now loaned to PEC Zwolle)
—	MF	ESP	Álvaro Santos (was on loan to Penafiel, now sold to Atlético Madrileño)

==== OH Leuven ====
In:

No.	Pos.	Nation	Player
—	MF	GHA	Emmanuel Addai (from Qarabağ)
—	MF	TUR	Hasan Bulut (promoted from OH Leuven U23)
—	DF	ITA	Alessandro Fontanarosa (on loan from Avellino)
—	MF	BEL	Matteo Heremans (promoted from OH Leuven U23)
—	MF	POL	Łukasz Łakomy (was on loan from Young Boys, buy clause activated)
—	DF	GER	Jamie Lawrence (from WSG Tirol)
—	FW	BEL	Robin Mirisola (on loan from Genk)
—	MF	BEL	Sebastian Murru (promoted from OH Leuven U23)
—	DF	JPN	Takuya Ogiwara (on loan from Urawa Red Diamonds)
—	MF	BEL	Manuel Osifo (loan return from Kortrijk)
—	GK	NED	Dani van den Heuvel (from Club Brugge)
—	FW	BEL	Chike Van de Ven (promoted from OH Leuven U23)
—	GK	BEL	Kiany Vroman (from Lierse)
—	FW	JPN	Shin Yamada (on loan from Celtic)

Out:

No.	Pos.	Nation	Player
1	GK	BEL	Tobe Leysen (to Genk)
5	DF	JPN	Takuma Ominami (to V-Varen Nagasaki)
10	MF	FRA	Youssef Maziz (to Colorado Rapids)
16	GK	FRA	Maxence Prévot (to Dunkerque)
30	DF	JPN	Takahiro Akimoto (to Machida Zelvia)
33	MF	BEL	Mathieu Maertens (to Cambuur)
39	FW	GUI	Sory Kaba (to Al Dhafra)
40	DF	BEL	Roméo Monticelli (to Francs Borains)
95	GK	BEL	Théo Radelet (to La Louvière)
—	MF	FIN	Casper Terho (was on loan to Sparta Rotterdam, now sold)

==== Mechelen ====
In:

No.	Pos.	Nation	Player
—	FW	NGR	Adeshina Ayodele (from Lille Reserves)
—	DF	BEL	Kobe Corbanie (from Antwerp)
—	MF	FRA	Marco Decherf (from Dunkerque)
—	DF	NED	Mike Eerdhuijzen (from Utrecht)
—	DF	NOR	Leo Hjelde (from Sunderland)
—	MF	CMR	Simion Michez (from Slavia Prague)
—	FW	BEL	Malcolm Lohunanu-Mbasi (from OH Leuven U23)
—	DF	NED	Luc Marijnissen (from Dender EH)
—	DF	BEL	Dennis Praet (from Antwerp)
—	MF	AUS	Ryan Teague (loan return from Melbourne City)
—	MF	BEL	Cedric Van Meirvenne (from Lierse)

Out:

No.	Pos.	Nation	Player
2	DF	MAR	Redouane Halhal (to Venezia)
8	MF	GUI	Mory Konaté (to Al-Hazem)
12	FW	BFA	Hassane Bandé (end of contract)
17	MF	BEL	Mathis Servais (to Millwall)
19	MF	SWE	Kerim Mrabti (to AEK Larnaca)
22	DF	SLO	Lovro Golič (on loan to Helmond Sport)
23	DF	MAR	Moncef Zekri (to Sporting CP)
30	MF	COD	Noah Makanza (was on loan to Helmond Sport, now sold to Umm Salal)
34	FW	BEL	Mauro Lenaerts (on loan to Helmond Sport)

==== Sint-Truiden ====
In:

No.	Pos.	Nation	Player
—	GK	KSA	Ahmed Abu Rasen (from Al Hilal)
—	MF	JPN	Ryotaro Araki (from Kashima Antlers)
—	FW	BIH	Samed Baždar (from Real Zaragoza)
—	FW	URU	Andrés Ferrari (loan return from Sporting Gijón)
—	MF	JPN	Nelson Ishiwatari (from Cerezo Osaka)
—	DF	BEL	Jeremy Mbambi (on loan from Pisa)
—	FW	COD	Nathanaël Mbuku (on loan from FC Augsburg)
—	MF	ALB	Arbnor Muja (was on loan from Samsunspor, now bought)
—	FW	BEL	Joedrick Pupe (was on loan from Vancouver Whitecaps, now bought)
—	FW	BEL	Frédéric Soelle Soelle (from RWDM Brussels)
—	DF	JPN	Kōta Takai (on loan from Tottenham Hotspur)
—	DF	BEL	Rune Verheyden (promoted from STVV Youth)

Out:

No.	Pos.	Nation	Player
6	MF	JPN	Rihito Yamamoto (to SC Freiburg)
11	MF	ARG	Isaías Delpupo (to Patro Eisden Maasmechelen)
12	GK	BEL	Jo Coppens (end of contract)
13	MF	JPN	Ryōtarō Itō (end of contract)
18	DF	NOR	Simen Juklerød (to DAC 1904)
32	FW	BEL	Jay-David Mbalanda (again on loan to Olympic Charleroi)
34	DF	BEL	Hugo Lambotte (on loan to Virton)
42	FW	JPN	Keisuke Gotō (loan return to Anderlecht)
53	MF	BEL	Adam Nhaili (on loan to Dender EH)

==== Standard Liège ====
In:

No.	Pos.	Nation	Player
—	MF	GAM	Salieu Drammeh (from Lillestrøm)
—	MF	CMR	Ryan Fosso (from Sturm Graz)
—	DF	BEL	Laurens Goemaere (from Club NXT)
—	FW	BUL	Sylvester Jasper (from Železničar Pančevo)
—	DF	BEL	Dimitri Lavalée (from Sturm Graz)
—	MF	ANG	Bruny Nsimba (from Dender EH)
—	MF	BEL	Noah Sy (promoted from SL16 FC)
—	MF	MAR	Rayan Touzghar (from Pau)
—	MF	FRA	Alexis Trouillet (from Rodez)
—	FW	SUI	Andi Zeqiri (from Widzew Łódź)

Out:

No.	Pos.	Nation	Player
4	DF	SCO	David Bates (to Amedspor)
5	DF	BEL	Boli Bolingoli (end of contract)
8	DF	CHI	Nayel Mehssatou (to Kortrijk)
9	FW	FRA	Thomas Henry (to Reggiana)
14	MF	BEL	Léandre Kuavita (to Beveren)
15	DF	CIV	Souleyman Doumbia (end of contract)
17	MF	COM	Rafiki Saïd (to Wolverhampton Wanderers)
19	FW	BEL	René Mitongo (to Trabzonspor)
22	DF	BEL	Alexandro Calut (to Olympic Charleroi)
45	GK	BEL	Matteo Godfroid (end of contract)
53	DF	BEL	Steeven Assengue (on loan to Virton)
59	FW	FRA	Timothé Nkada (on loan to Troyes)
80	MF	MLT	Teddy Teuma (to Sliema Wanderers)
95	FW	FRA	Grejohn Kyei (end of contract)
—	MF	BEL	Tom Poitoux (was on loan to MVV Maastricht, then demoted to SL16 FC)
—	DF	CRO	Boško Šutalo (was on loan to Cracovia, now loaned to Aris)

==== Union SG ====
In:

No.	Pos.	Nation	Player
—	MF	ARG	Dylan Aquino (from Lanús)
—	GK	BEL	Keo Boets (from Dessel Sport)
—	DF	FRA	Nohim Chibani (from Quevilly-Rouen)
—	DF	BEL	Denzel De Roeve (from Brann)
—	DF	JPN	Nikki Havenaar (from Ried)
—	FW	BEL	Ilan Hurtevent (from Kortrijk)
—	GK	BFA	Hervé Koffi (from Lens)
—	DF	CZE	Ondřej Kričfaluši (from Baník Ostrava)
—	MF	RSA	Relebohile Mofokeng (from Orlando Pirates)
—	MF	ROU	Darius Olaru (from FCSB)

Out:

No.	Pos.	Nation	Player
3	DF	SEN	Mamadou Thierno Barry (on loan to Al Shabab)
7	MF	GHA	Mohammed Fuseini (on loan to Derby County)
12	FW	CAN	Promise David (on loan to Brighton & Hove Albion)
16	DF	ENG	Christian Burgess (released to Gent)
19	DF	BEL	Guillaume François (retired)
20	FW	SUI	Marc Giger (to ETO)
21	GK	BEL	Jens Teunckens (end of contract)
22	MF	SEN	Ousseynou Niang (to Zulte Waregem)
25	MF	ISR	Anan Khalaili (to Crystal Palace)
35	MF	BEL	Nathan Huygevelde (to Hvidovre)
37	GK	NED	Kjell Scherpen (to Ipswich Town)
48	DF	BEL	Fedde Leysen (on loan to Sassuolo)
—	FW	GEQ	Cristian Makaté (was on loan to La Louvière, now sold to Lierse)

==== Westerlo ====
In:

No.	Pos.	Nation	Player
—	FW	FRA	David Amegnaglo (from SC Freiburg)
—	DF	HUN	Botond Balogh (from Parma)
—	FW	BEL	Norman Bassette (on loan from Coventry City)
—	MF	CMR	Philippe Bibout (from Gambinos Stars)
—	MF	WAL	Cameron Congreve (from Swansea City)
—	FW	BIH	Dino Delić (from Austria Klagenfurt)
—	MF	SEN	Pape Diong (from Strasbourg)
—	FW	BEL	Fabio Ferraro (from Dender EH)
—	DF	DEN	Lasse Flø (from Vejle)
—	MF	CIV	Ibrahim Fofana (from Amiens)
—	FW	CIV	Abdoulaye Koné (from Oulu)
—	GK	BEL	Bill Lathouwers (from RWDM Brussels)
—	DF	GER	Reno Münz (from SpVgg Greuther Fürth)
—	MF	BEL	Cisse Sandra (from Club Brugge)
—	MF	BEL	Nikola Storm (from Antalyaspor)
—	FW	SUI	Emmanuel Tsimba (from Young Boys)
—	GK	SUR	Jahnilo Wiegel-Triebel (promoted from Westerlo U21)
—	MF	KOR	Min-hyeok Yang (on loan from Tottenham Hotspur)

Out:

No.	Pos.	Nation	Player
3	DF	CIV	Bakary Haidara (to Felgueiras)
6	DF	FRA	Clinton Nsiala (loan return to Rangers)
7	FW	IRI	Allahyar Sayyadmanesh (to Lech Poznań)
9	FW	KOS	Eliot Bujupi (loan return to VfB Stuttgart II)
10	FW	POR	Afonso Patrão (to Pafos)
17	MF	BEL	Raf Smekens (to Houtvenne)
22	DF	USA	Bryan Reynolds (to Rennes)
29	FW	CIV	Fernand Gouré (to Radomiak Radom)
30	GK	BEL	Koen Van Langendonck (to Patro Eisden Maasmechelen)
31	GK	BEL	Oskar Annell (on loan to Houtvenne)
33	DF	RUS	Roman Neustädter (retired)
40	DF	TUR	Emin Bayram (to İstanbul Başakşehir)
46	MF	BEL	Arthur Piedfort (to Auxerre)
77	FW	CRC	Josimar Alcócer (to Sparta Prague)
90	FW	ESP	Nacho Ferri (to Feyenoord)
94	FW	TUR	Enis Destan (loan return to Hull City)
—	MF	POL	Karol Borys (was on loan to Maribor, now sold to Śląsk Wrocław)
—	GK	BEL	Zenzo De Boeck (was on loan to Houtvenne, now released to Thes Sport)
—	MF	POL	Enzo Geerts (was on loan to Houtvenne, then released to Belisia Bilzen)

==== Zulte Waregem ====
In:

No.	Pos.	Nation	Player
—	MF	FRA	Marley Aké (was on loan from Yverdon-Sport, now bought)
—	FW	BEL	Hemsley Akpa-Chukwu (from Seraing)
—	FW	HUN	Zalán István Átrok (from MTK Budapest)
—	DF	MLI	Salim Diakité (on loan from Palermo)
—	MF	CRO	Niko Horvat (on loan from Borussia Mönchengladbach II)
—	DF	SEN	Youssoupha Mbodji (on loan from Slavia Prague)
—	MF	SEN	Ousseynou Niang (from Union SG)

Out:

No.	Pos.	Nation	Player
2	DF	TUR	Kadir Seven (on loan to Vanspor)
9	FW	BEL	Jelle Vossen (released to Beerschot)
10	MF	DEN	Jeppe Erenbjerg (to Genk)
11	FW	CYP	Stavros Gavriil (to Nacional)
17	FW	ENG	Emran Soglo (loan return to Sturm Graz)
19	DF	BEL	Benoît Nyssen (end of contract)
22	MF	GHA	Joseph Opoku (to Swansea City)
27	MF	CIV	Ibrahim Diabaté (to Egnatia)
31	DF	BEL	Lukas Willen (to Pogoń Szczecin)
58	FW	BEL	Siebe Van Keymolen (to Hasselt)
64	MF	BEL	Thibaud Sergeant (to Roeselare)
—	FW	PHI	Dylan Demuynck (was on loan to Lierse, now sold to HSV Hoek)
—	DF	BEL	Andres Labie (loan return from Beerschot, now released to Hasselt)
—	FW	NED	Jevon Simons (was on loan to De Graafschap, now sold to Ústí nad Labem)
—	GK	NED	Ennio van der Gouw (was on loan to Rio Ave, now sold)

=== Challenger Pro League teams ===
==== Beerschot ====
In:

No.	Pos.	Nation	Player
—	MF	BEL	Abian Arslan (from RFC Liège)
—	DF	BEL	Sem Audoor (from Club NXT)
—	DF	BEL	Jordan Bustin (from RFC Liège)
—	MF	JPN	Takatora Einaga (from Kawasaki Frontale)
—	FW	NED	Toshio Lake (from Olympic Charleroi)
—	GK	JPN	William Popp (again on loan from Shonan Bellmare)
—	MF	BEL	Mats Rits (from Anderlecht)
—	GK	BEL	Brent Stevens (from Genk)
—	FW	BEL	Kindo Suma (promoted from Beerschot U21)
—	FW	BEL	Jelle Vossen (from Zulte Waregem)

Out:

No.	Pos.	Nation	Player
2	DF	FRA	Colin Dagba (to Carrarese)
7	MF	NED	Rajiv van La Parra (end of contract)
16	DF	BEL	Andres Labie (loan return to Zulte Waregem)
18	MF	BEL	Ryan Sanusi (to Hasselt)
19	FW	FRA	Sabri Guendouz (to Heart of Midlothian)
26	DF	BEL	Derrick Tshimanga (retired)
33	GK	BEL	Nick Shinton (to Sønderjyske)
41	FW	ESP	Oscar Vargas (to ISE FC)
43	MF	BEL	Xander Joosen (on loan to Wilrijk)
44	FW	BEL	Rayan El Grafel (to RWDM Brussels)
71	FW	JPN	Ken Masui (loan return to Nagoya Grampus)
75	MF	POR	Nilton Varela (to Marítimo)
94	MF	ALG	Cyril Khetir (to Fleury)
—	MF	URU	Thiago Lugano (was on loan to Pontedera, now loaned to Nardò)

==== Club NXT ====
In:

No.	Pos.	Nation	Player
—	FW	COL	Kevin Angulo (on loan from América de Cali)
—	MF	BEL	Emiel Callens (promoted from Club Brugge U18)
—	DF	FRA	Samba Coulibaly (from PSG Youth Academy)
—	DF	ENG	Emmanuel Fejokwu (from West Ham United Under-21s and Academy)
—	DF	BEL	Mateo Haesaert (promoted from Club Brugge U18)
—	MF	BEL	Al-Hassan Kamara (promoted from Club Brugge U18)
—	GK	BEL	Thibeau Kestemont (promoted from Club Brugge U18)
—	MF	TUR	Utku Kurtal (promoted from Club Brugge U18)
—	MF	FRA	Elijah Ly (from PSG Youth Academy)
—	DF	BEL	Briek Morel (from Jong KAA Gent)
—	DF	GHA	Denis Odoi (from NAC Breda)
—	MF	BEL	Clever Ossohou (promoted from Club Brugge Youth)
—	DF	BEL	Milan Robberechts (from Patro Eisden Maasmechelen)
—	FW	BEL	Matteo Soria (promoted from Club Brugge U18)
—	DF	GER	Dahrel Tchitchi (from 1. FC Heidenheim)

Out:

No.	Pos.	Nation	Player
57	MF	POR	Chris Grombahi (loan return to Sporting CP)
60	MF	IRL	Grady McDonnell (to Nottingham Forest Academy)
63	MF	BEL	Sacha Marloye (on loan to RWDM Brussels)
66	DF	CIV	Bi Abdoul Kader Yameogo (end of contract)
73	DF	BEL	Laurens Goemaere (to Standard Liège)
74	FW	BEL	Jesse Bisiwu (to Barcelona Atlètic)
77	DF	BEL	Thibaut Van Acker (to Eendracht Aalst Lede)
78	MF	DEN	Tobias Lund Jensen (on loan to Ried)
79	FW	BEL	Rayan Buifrahi (to FC Eindhoven)
81	GK	BEL	Argus Vanden Driessche (promoted to Club Brugge)
83	DF	BEL	Sem Audoor (to Beerschot)
85	MF	SLO	Tian Nai Koren (promoted to Club Brugge)
86	MF	ITA	Gianluca Okon (promoted to Club Brugge)
96	DF	BEL	Siebe Wylin (to Fortuna Sittard)
99	FW	BEL	Yanis Musuayi (to Levante)

==== Dender EH ====
In:

No.	Pos.	Nation	Player
—	FW	CMR	Emmanuel Amougou (from Virton)
—	MF	BEL	Oumar Balde (promoted from Dender EH U21)
—	DF	BEL	Ilias Breugelmans (from MVV Maastricht)
—	GK	BEL	Julien Devriendt (from Patro Eisden Maasmechelen)
—	MF	FRA	Kembo Diliwidi (from Lens)
—	DF	HAI	Martin Expérience (from Nancy)
—	DF	POR	Pedro Gomes (from Valencia Mestalla)
—	DF	GLP	Christopher Jullien (from Montpellier)
—	MF	BEL	Pjotr Kestens (from RWDM Brussels)
—	MF	BEL	Adam Nhaili (on loan from Sint-Truiden)
—	GK	BDI	Mattéo Nkurunziza (from RWDM Brussels)
—	MF	POL	Oskar Szulc (from RWDM Brussels)
—	FW	BEL	Gerard Vandeplas (on loan from Antwerp)

Out:

No.	Pos.	Nation	Player
5	DF	NED	Luc Marijnissen (to Mechelen)
7	DF	FRA	Bryan Goncalves (end of contract)
11	MF	IDN	Ragnar Oratmangoen (to Persib Bandung)
16	MF	CZE	Roman Květ (to Bohemians 1905)
17	MF	BEL	Noah Mbamba (loan return to Bayer Leverkusen)
19	FW	NGR	Jordan Attah Kadiri (end of contract)
22	DF	NGR	Benjamin Fredrick (loan return to Brentford B)
23	MF	BEL	Desmond Acquah (to Kapaz)
27	FW	IRI	Alireza Jahanbakhsh (to Excelsior)
30	GK	FRA	Guillaume Dietsch (end of contract)
34	GK	NED	Michael Verrips (to NAC Breda)
37	FW	BEL	Ryan Adewusi (to Knokke)
44	DF	CAN	Luc de Fougerolles (loan return to Fulham B)
77	MF	ANG	Bruny Nsimba (to Standard Liège)
88	FW	BEL	Fabio Ferraro (to Westerlo)
90	FW	BEL	Mohamed Berte (to Cracovia)
93	GK	FRA	Gauthier Gallon (to Le Havre)
—	FW	CMR	Abdoulaye Yahaya (was on loan to Leixões, now released to Llapi)

==== Eupen ====
In:

No.	Pos.	Nation	Player
—	DF	BEL	Luca Chavet (loan return from Namur)
—	MF	BEL	Mathias Fixelles (from Francs Borains)
—	GK	BEL	Antoine Lejoly (from ADO Den Haag)
—	DF	GBS	Malam Malú (from Sporting CP)
—	MF	CIV	Chris-Kévin Nadje (from Feyenoord)
—	DF	NGR	Michael Precious (from Supreme Kings Football Academy)
—	FW	GER	Ba-Muaka Simakala (from Araz-Naxçıvan)
—	MF	BEL	Aron Sulejmani (from Belisia Bilzen)
—	MF	POR	Sandro Vidigal (on loan from Braga)

Out:

No.	Pos.	Nation	Player
4	DF	CAN	Scott Kennedy (to SGV Freiberg)
8	MF	GER	Kevin Möhwald (end of contract)
9	FW	GER	Daniel Kasper (to Vaduz)
10	MF	FRA	Nathan Bitumazala (to Alemannia Aachen)
15	MF	SUI	Gabriel Barès (end of contract)
20	FW	BEL	Zakkaria Atteri (to Patro Eisden Maasmechelen)
21	DF	COD	Merveille Bokadi (end of contract)
24	DF	FRA	Yoram Zague (loan return to Paris Saint-Germain)
33	GK	GHA	Abdul Manaf Nurudeen (end of contract)
39	MF	QAT	Mostafa Meshaal (loan return to Al Sadd)
—	DF	BEL	Luca Dalla Costa (was on loan to Lecce U21, now sold)
—	FW	NGR	Ade Oguns (was on loan to Ferizaj, then released)
—	DF	BEL	Andrea Piron (was on loan to Meux, then end of contract)

==== Francs Borains ====
In:

No.	Pos.	Nation	Player
—	FW	GHA	Raymond Asante (on loan from Charleroi)
—	GK	BEL	Rafael Celsi (from Paris FC)
—	FW	FRA	Enzo Faty (on loan from Toulouse)
—	GK	IRL	Noah Jauny (from Brest)
—	MF	BEL	Kéres Masangu (from Patro Eisden Maasmechelen)
—	MF	BEL	Rabby Mateta (from DAC Dunajská Streda)
—	DF	BEL	Roméo Monticelli (from OH Leuven)
—	MF	COD	Dieumerci Ndongala (from Bandırmaspor)
—	MF	CIV	Severin Nioule (on loan from Charleroi)
—	MF	GER	Nils Ortel (from SpVgg Unterhaching)
—	DF	BEL	Xavier Preijs (from RWDM Brussels)
—	GK	FRA	Paul Tilloy (promoted from Francs Borains U21)
—	DF	FRA	Nicolas Wasbauer (from Toulouse B)

Out:

No.	Pos.	Nation	Player
1	GK	COM	Yannick Pandor (loan return to Lens)
2	FW	HAI	Mondy Prunier (loan return to Charleroi)
5	DF	BEL	Jasper Van Oudenhove (to RWDM Brussels)
6	FW	BEL	Sébastien Dewaest (retired)
8	MF	BEL	Lukas Mondele (to Cercle Brugge)
11	MF	BEL	Mathias Fixelles (to Eupen)
17	MF	BEL	Massimo Bruno (retired)
18	DF	BEL	Romain Donnez (to Grand Canyon Antelopes)
19	FW	SRB	Slobodan Stanojlovic (loan return to Charleroi)
20	MF	BEL	Theo Gécé (to RWDM Brussels)
21	MF	POL	Adrian Troc (to Świt Nowy Dwór Mazowiecki)
22	GK	BEL	Dalyan Lamblin (to Flénu)
26	DF	ALG	Yanis Hadjem (to Cannes)
60	FW	BEL	Arsène Wukanya (to Javor Matis)
98	FW	BEL	Jordy Soladio (to Victoria Rosport)
—	FW	BEL	Amine Benfriha (to Esperanza Pelt)
—	MF	POL	Patryk Walicki (was on loan to Knokke, now sold to Unia Skierniewice)

==== Hasselt ====
In:

No.	Pos.	Nation	Player
—	DF	BEL	Ethan Butera (from Jong Ajax)
—	GK	BEL	Leonardo Cascio (from Belisia Bilzen)
—	FW	BEL	Wilson Da Costa (from Jong Genk)
—	FW	BEL	Lino Decresson (from Jong Genk)
—	MF	BEL	Geoffry Hairemans (from Antwerp)
—	MF	BEL	Robbe Hayen (promoted from Hasselt U21)
—	DF	BEL	Andres Labie (from Zulte Waregem)
—	DF	BEL	Lucca Lucker (from RFC Liège)
—	MF	BEL	Alain Matoka (was on loan from Lokeren, now bought)
—	DF	BEL	Japhet Muanza (from Patro Eisden Maasmechelen)
—	DF	BEL	Jérémie Mugabo (from Union Namur)
—	FW	BEL	Javan Ngoyi (from Dessel Sport)
—	FW	BEL	Nicolas Orye (from Patro Eisden Maasmechelen)
—	GK	BEL	Milo Roekaerts (from Thes Sport)
—	MF	BEL	Ryan Sanusi (from Beerschot)
—	FW	BEL	Siebe Van Keymolen (from Zulte Waregem)

Out:

No.	Pos.	Nation	Player
1	GK	BEL	Lennart Ghijsens (retired)
3	DF	BEL	Kel Ofori (to Bocholt)
5	DF	BEL	Jerôme Kroonen (to Belisia Bilzen)
9	FW	BEL	Tibe Verhaeren (to RWDM Brussels)
15	MF	BEL	Mathise Reumers (to Thes)
16	FW	BEL	Sam Valcke (to Roeselare)
19	MF	BEL	Elias Sierra (to MVV Maastricht)
21	GK	BEL	Thomas Vranken (to Belisia Bilzen)
26	GK	BEL	Jitse Vandermotten (to Berchem Sport)
42	MF	BEL	Joël Mokam (to Heist)
43	DF	COD	Daniel Tshilanda (to Union SG B)
77	DF	BEL	Beni Mpanzu (loan return to Cercle Brugge)
—	MF	BEL	Max Bette (to Wilrijk)

==== Jong Genk ====
In:

No.	Pos.	Nation	Player
—	MF	BEL	Kiyan Achahbar (promoted from Genk U18)
—	GK	BUL	Mariyan Boev (from Botev Plovdiv)
—	MF	BEL	Lander Borgers (promoted from Genk U18)
—	MF	KAZ	Shakhmurat Dauletov (promoted from Genk U18)
—	MF	BEL	Jens De Groof (promoted from Genk U18)
—	DF	BEL	Sami El Morabet (promoted from Genk U18)
—	DF	BEL	Zion Henry (promoted from Genk U18)
—	DF	BEL	Wout Kapers (promoted from Genk U18)
—	FW	GAM	Mustapha Koma (from Dinamo City)
—	MF	CIV	Moussa Koné (on loan from San Pédro)
—	DF	BEL	Tinus Moorthamer (from Antwerp U18)
—	MF	BEL	Prince N'Salambi (from Standard Liège U18)
—	MF	BEL	Precious Ogbeiwi (promoted from Genk U18)
—	MF	BEL	Wout Willemsen (promoted from Genk U18)

Out:

No.	Pos.	Nation	Player
52	FW	BEL	Wilson Da Costa (to Hasselt)
65	DF	NGR	Christian Akpan (promoted to Genk)
67	FW	BEL	Ali Camara (to Juventus Next Gen)
68	MF	BEL	Ayman Rabhi (end of contract)
70	FW	BEL	Lino Decresson (to Hasselt)
73	MF	BEL	Elie Mbavu (promoted to Genk)
80	FW	COD	Elie Mpungu Kongolo (loan return to TP les Anges)
82	GK	BEL	Olivier Vliegen (to Česká Lípa)
85	DF	KOR	Min-woo Kang (loan return to Ulsan HD)
86	MF	BEL	Kenan Haroun (promoted to Genk)
87	MF	JPN	Kenshin Yasuda (loan return to Oita Trinita)
—	DF	ECU	Alfred Caicedo (was on loan to Cádiz, now sold to Vizela)

==== Jong KAA Gent ====
In:

No.	Pos.	Nation	Player
—	DF	BFA	Abdoul Ayinde (demoted from Gent)
—	DF	BEL	Arthur De Kimpe (from OH Leuven U23)
—	FW	SEN	Moctar Diop (demoted from Gent)
—	MF	BEL	Noah Laghmich (loan return from KRC Gent)
—	MF	LAT	Mikelis Menniks (from Metta)
—	DF	CIV	Abdul Aziz Ouedraogo (from Crystal Palace)
—	MF	BEL	Loris Pirotte (from RFC Liège U18)
—	MF	GUI	Alseny Soumah (from Académie Foot Talents de Guinée)
—	FW	ENG	Jemiah Umolu (from Crystal Palace U21)
—	DF	HON	Victor Vandenbroucke (promoted from Gent U18)
—	GK	BEL	Liam Wouters (promoted from Gent U18)
—	FW	NGR	Daniel Wisdom (on loan from Spartak Subotica)

Out:

No.	Pos.	Nation	Player
50	GK	BEL	René Vanden Borre (to Zelzate)
51	GK	BEL	Victor De Coninck (promoted to Gent)
52	GK	BEL	Ferre Van Herrewege (to Wetteren)
55	DF	CIV	Eric Simpore (loan return to SOA)
56	DF	SEN	Mamadou Diallo (promoted to Gent)
59	MF	SEN	El Hadji Seck (promoted to Gent)
61	FW	NGR	Abubakar Abdullahi (promoted to Gent)
63	DF	JPN	Sota Tsukuda (loan return to Yokohama)
65	DF	BEL	Briek Morel (to Club NXT)
70	MF	BEL	Jassim Mazouz (to Lokeren)
75	FW	SEN	Ibrahima Cissé (promoted to Gent)
80	MF	BEL	Briek Van Hoorick (to Merelbeke)

==== Lierse ====
In:

No.	Pos.	Nation	Player
—	MF	MAR	Yassine Aouriaghel (promoted from Lierse U21)
—	MF	MAR	Saïf-Eddine Boutkabout (promoted from Lierse U21)
—	FW	NED	Jayden Braaf (free agent)
—	GK	BEL	Louis Daems (promoted from Lierse U18)
—	DF	BEL	Dylan Dassy (from Beveren)
—	MF	BEL	Pierre Dwomoh (from Watford)
—	MF	BEL	Rayan El Touile (promoted from Lierse U21)
—	FW	BEL	Kyan Himpe (on loan from Kortrijk)
—	MF	BEL	Christian Kouam (from Grasshopper Club Zurich)
—	FW	GEQ	Cristian Makaté (from Union SG)
—	MF	BEL	Noam Mayoka-Tika (was on loan from Charleroi, now bought)
—	MF	COD	Yohan Mboko (from OH Leuven U23)
—	MF	BEL	Marko Mitrović (from Jedinstvo Ub)
—	MF	NED	Bryan Smeets (from MVV Maastricht)

Out:

No.	Pos.	Nation	Player
5	DF	BEL	Brent Laes (to Dessel Sport)
6	MF	BEL	Emmanuel Matuta (end of contract)
7	FW	MAR	Yassin Hidraoui-Akachar (to Zébra Élites)
8	MF	FRA	Victor Daguin (to Sepsi OSK)
17	FW	PHI	Dylan Demuynck (loan return to Zulte Waregem)
18	DF	BEL	Bryan Ekmen (to Diegem)
19	MF	BEL	Tiago Vermeulen (to Young Reds Antwerp)
22	MF	BEL	Cedric Van Meirvenne (to Mechelen)
23	MF	FRA	Mansour Sy (released)
44	DF	BEL	Lander Verbist (to Lyra-Lierse)
45	MF	BEL	Noah De Ridder (to Knokke)
61	GK	BEL	Kiany Vroman (to OH Leuven)
77	DF	BEL	Hugo Masaki (to Leiria)
—	GK	CAN	Kieran Baskett (again on loan to Brattvåg)
—	MF	BEL	Demba Sylla (demoted to Lierse U21)

==== Lokeren ====
In:

No.	Pos.	Nation	Player
—	DF	GER	Jorden Aigboje (from SpVgg Unterhaching)
—	DF	BEL	Jérôme Arens (promoted from Lokeren U21)
—	DF	FRA	Salim Ben Seghir (from Neuchâtel Xamax)
—	DF	BEL	Robin Denuit (from Charleroi)
—	GK	BEL	Céryl De Schrijver (promoted from Lokeren U21)
—	FW	CIV	Aboubacar Dindane (from Abidjan City)
—	DF	BEL	Djovkar Doudaev (from RWDM Brussels)
—	FW	FRA	Modeste Duku (from Virton)
—	DF	BEL	Jonas Lietaert (was on loan from Cercle Brugge, now bought)
—	MF	BEL	Paeneach Mavinga (promoted from Lokeren U21)
—	MF	BEL	Jassim Mazouz (from Jong KAA Gent)
—	FW	ENG	Ademola Ola-Adebomi (from WSG Tirol)
—	MF	ALB	Luan Simnica (from Erzgebirge Aue)
—	GK	BEL	Viktor Van Israel (promoted from Lokeren U21)
—	FW	BEL	Ilyas Zerioh (promoted from Lokeren U21)

Out:

No.	Pos.	Nation	Player
1	GK	NED	Tein Troost (released to Llapi)
2	DF	BEL	Jonas Vinck (to RWDM Brussels)
3	DF	BEL	Jeovanni Dianganga (to Guingamp)
5	DF	BEL	Naïm Boujouh (released to Mons)
6	MF	BEL	Sebastiaan Brebels (to HSV Hoek)
8	FW	ESP	Iñaki Elejalde (released to Pontevedra)
9	FW	NED	Tom Boere (to HSV Hoek)
10	FW	BEL	Mohamed Soumaré (to Al Hamriyah)
15	MF	BEL	Senne Torck (to KRC Gent)
22	FW	BEL	Alama Bayo (loan return to Cercle Brugge)
25	MF	BEL	Indy Boonen (to Radnik Bijeljina)
33	DF	ESP	Diego Cámara (to Sliema Wanderers)
39	GK	BEL	Yben Baert (to Avanti Stekene)
47	DF	BEL	Ibrahim Digberekou (loan return to Borussia Mönchengladbach II)
97	DF	FRA	Alexis Calant (to Olympic Charleroi)
—	MF	BEL	Alain Matoka (was on loan to Hasselt, now sold)

==== Patro Eisden Maasmechelen ====
In:

No.	Pos.	Nation	Player
—	FW	BEL	Zakkaria Atteri (from Eupen)
—	GK	BEL	Jordi Belin (from RFC Liège)
—	FW	COD	Jeremy Bokila (from Livingston)
—	FW	GER	Jan Dahlke (from KSV Hessen Kassel)
—	MF	ARG	Isaías Delpupo (from Sint-Truiden)
—	DF	GER	Lars Dietz (from Viktoria Köln)
—	DF	NOR	Hasan Jahic (from Olympic Charleroi)
—	FW	KOR	Seok-ju Hong (from Rot-Weiß Oberhausen)
—	DF	CMR	Raoul Kenne (loan return from Mons)
—	DF	BEL	Kevin Kis (from Olympic Charleroi)
—	MF	BEL	Sami Lahssaini (from La Louvière)
—	DF	TAN	Haji Mnoga (from Salford City)
—	MF	JPN	Tsubasa Kasayanagi (from V-Varen Nagasaki)
—	FW	JPN	Rento Takaoka (from Southampton)
—	GK	BEL	Koen Van Langendonck (from Westerlo)
—	MF	BEL	Louis Verstraete (from Auckland)

Out:

No.	Pos.	Nation	Player
1	GK	BEL	Gian Geladé (to Dessel Sport)
5	DF	BEL	Benoit Olivier (on loan to Knokke)
6	MF	BEL	Kéres Masangu (to Francs Borains)
9	FW	BEL	Léandro Rousseau (to La Louvière)
10	MF	BEL	Ridwane M'Barki (on loan to RWDM Brussels)
11	MF	NED	Amir Rais (to VVV-Venlo)
13	DF	UKR	Denys Prychynenko (to Wiltz 71)
16	GK	BEL	Julien Devriendt (to Dender EH)
17	FW	MAR	Ilyas Lefrancq (released)
20	FW	GHA	Raymond Asante (loan return to Charleroi)
21	MF	BEL	Simon Boogmans (to Hoogstraten)
25	MF	BEL	Yassin Gueroui (retired)
28	FW	BEL	Nezar Ahassad (to Berchem Sport)
31	FW	BEL	Nicolas Orye (to Hasselt)
39	DF	BEL	Milan Robberechts (to Club NXT)
46	DF	COM	Aaron Kamardin (to RWDM Brussels)
52	DF	NED	Raphaël Sarfo (end of contract)
55	DF	BEL	Japhet Muanza (to Hasselt)
85	DF	BEL	Arnaud Dony (on loan to Rochefort)
90	MF	KSA	Mohammed Al-Rashidi (to Al-Kholood)
—	FW	TUR	Hüseyin Ertürk (signed from Beveren, then loaned to Belisia Bilzen)

==== RFC Liège ====
In:

No.	Pos.	Nation	Player
—	MF	TUN	Nacim Dendani (from Monaco Reserves and Academy)
—	MF	BEL	Valentin Guillaume (from Virton)
—	DF	COD	Ilunga Kitoko (from Tirsense)
—	GK	BEL	Joshua Mpenza (loan return from Aywaille)
—	MF	BEL	Afonso N'Salambi (from SL16 FC)
—	FW	KEN	Ryan Ogam (on loan from Wolfsberger)
—	GK	BEL	Oregan Ravet (from SL16 FC)
—	MF	EGY	Adham Refai (on loan from El Gouna)
—	FW	LUX	Arnold Qevani (from Racing Union Luxembourg)
—	MF	SEN	Biran Wane (from Oslo Football Academy)

Out:

No.	Pos.	Nation	Player
2	DF	BEL	Martin Wasinski (loan return to Schalke 04)
4	DF	BEL	Jordan Bustin (to Beerschot)
9	FW	TUR	Emrehan Gedikli (to Aliağa)
11	FW	FRA	Alexis Lefebvre (to Pau)
12	GK	BEL	Jordi Belin (to Patro Eisden Maasmechelen)
14	DF	BEL	Lucca Lucker (to Hasselt)
15	MF	BEL	Abian Arslan (to Beerschot)
19	FW	BEL	Frédéric Soelle Soelle (loan return to RWDM Brussels)
20	FW	TOG	Fadel Gobitaka (to Thionville)
24	MF	BEL	Alexis De Sart (end of contract)
27	DF	FRA	Victor Corneillie (to Seraing)
—	MF	BEL	Stefano Marzo (to Grenstrappers Kolonie)
—	MF	FRA	Théo Pierrot (end of contract)

==== RSCA Futures ====
In:

No.	Pos.	Nation	Player
—	MF	MAR	Mohamed Abdellaoui (promoted from Anderlecht U18)
—	MF	BEL	Ilyas Benktib (promoted from Anderlecht U18)
—	FW	ALG	Willsem Boussaid (from Châteauroux)
—	¨MF	BEL	Gorak Ghale (promoted from Anderlecht U18)
—	GK	BEL	Daan Gilis (from Beerschot U18)
—	DF	SEN	Cheikh Koité (from Bourg-Péronnas)
—	MF	BEL	Adjani Mujangi Bia (promoted from Anderlecht U18)
—	GK	BEL	Kamiel Timmermans (promoted from Anderlecht U18)

Out:

No.	Pos.	Nation	Player
2	DF	GER	Zoumana Keita (promoted to Anderlecht)
47	MF	BEL	Gabriel Biladi (to Levante)
49	FW	BEL	Jayden Onia Seke (promoted to Anderlecht)
50	DF	BEL	Kaïs Barry (promoted to Anderlecht)
52	MF	BEL	Noa Ojea (promoted to Anderlecht)
61	MF	BEL	Joshua Nga Kana (promoted to Anderlecht)
62	DF	BEL	Basile Vroninks (promoted to Anderlecht)
66	GK	BEL	Michiel Haentjens (promoted to Anderlecht)
68	MF	GHA	Antwi Dacosta (loan return to Young Apostles)
73	GK	SWE	Joachim Imbrechts (end of contract)
80	MF	USA	Devon De Corte (to Den Bosch)
82	FW	COD	Samuel Ntanda-Lukisa (to Leiria)
90	MF	SEN	Pape Aliya N'dao (loan return to Young African Promises)
—	MF	BEL	Jarne Flies (was on loan to Lecce, now sold)

==== Seraing ====
In:

No.	Pos.	Nation	Player
—	MF	BEL	Reda Aamer (promoted from Seraing U21)
—	FW	BEL	Matteo Bisarre (promoted from Seraing U21)
—	DF	LUX	Relja Bisevac (promoted from Seraing U21)
—	DF	FRA	Victor Corneillie (from RFC Liège)
—	DF	SEN	Moustapha Diop (on loan from Metz)
—	FW	FRA	Mahi-Nathan Gnemagnon (on loan from Metz)
—	GK	FRA	Romain Jean-Baptiste (from Metz B)
—	DF	TOG	Yannis Lawson (on loan from Metz)
—	FW	ALG	Amine Messoussa (from MC Alger)
—	DF	FRA	Anas Namri (from Virton)
—	MF	FRA	Alexandre Tunkadi (from Olympique Marseille B)
—	FW	BEL	Nils Velleuer (promoted from Seraing U21)

Out:

No.	Pos.	Nation	Player
5	DF	GER	Kevin Bukusu (to RWDM Brussels)
6	DF	BEL	Noah Solheid (to Charleroi)
7	MF	LUX	Diego Duarte (loan return to Metz B)
9	FW	FRA	Édouard Soumah-Abbad (loan return to Metz)
13	DF	FRA	Hady Camara (to Paris 13 Atletico)
15	DF	SEN	Cheikhou Ndiaye (end of contract)
17	MF	BEL	Bassim Boukteb (end of contract)
20	FW	BEL	Maxime Mejjati-Alami (loan return to Nantes B)
23	MF	SEN	Djibril Diarra (to Kalamata)
25	FW	FRA	Abdoulaye Ba (loan return to Metz B)
26	FW	GAB	Harrison Ondo-Eyi (released)
27	DF	BEL	Thiago Paulo da Silva (end of contract)
28	DF	SEN	Thierno Gaye (end of contract)
33	MF	MAR	Malek Adrar (end of contract)
40	MF	BEL	Jérémy Landu (to Stockay)
98	FW	BEL	Hemsley Akpa-Chukwu (to Zulte Waregem)
—	GK	BEL	Arthur De Bolle (was on loan to Crossing Schaerbeek, now sold)

==== Virton ====
In:

No.	Pos.	Nation	Player
—	DF	BEL	Steeven Assengue (on loan from Standard Liège)
—	DF	ALG	Yassine Ben Hamed (from Paradou)
—	GK	BEL	Nicolas Closset (from Charleroi)
—	MF	BEL	Lorenzo De Geyndt (from Ninove)
—	GK	BEL	Célestin De Schrevel (from La Louvière)
—	MF	MTN	Adama Diop (from Girondins de Bordeaux)
—	FW	FRA	Nathan Fernandes (from Tuttocuoio)
—	FW	FRA	Abdelsamad Hachem (on loan from Red Star)
—	DF	MAD	Ehsan Kari (from Fréjus Saint-Raphaël)
—	DF	BEL	Hugo Lambotte (on loan from Sint-Truiden)
—	MF	FRA	Yanis Lentini (promoted from Virton U21)
—	MF	NOR	Luca Maiorano (from Roda JC)
—	DF	CGO	Brad Mantsounga (on loan from Nice)
—	DF	BEL	William Simba (from Milsami Orhei)
—	DF	FRA	Allan Tchaptchet (from Grenoble)
—	MF	FRA	Antoine Valério (from Chambly)
—	MF	FRA	Paul Wade (from Châteauroux)

Out:

No.	Pos.	Nation	Player
2	DF	FRA	Raphaël Diarra (to Atert Bissen)
3	DF	FRA	Dylan Sia (to Borgo)
4	DF	FRA	Baptiste Aloé (to Mondorf-les-Bains)
7	DF	FRA	Anas Namri (to Seraing)
9	FW	CMR	Emmanuel Amougou (to Dender EH)
10	FW	BEL	Mayron de Almeida (to Mons)
11	FW	FRA	Modeste Duku (to Lokeren)
14	MF	BEL	Valentin Guillaume (to RFC Liège)
16	GK	BEL	Arthur Cremer (to Charleroi)
17	MF	LUX	Lucas Correia (to Atert Bissen)
18	FW	FRA	Wissem Bouhadiche (to Saint-Priest)
19	DF	FRA	Lamine Buhanga (end of contract)
20	FW	FRA	Sullivan Lakhamy (end of contract)
21	FW	BEL	Sullivan Coulibaly (to Habay)
24	FW	BEL	Liam Genève (to Habay)
30	GK	FRA	Killian Brandily (to Namur)
