= 2025–26 Challenger Pro League =

Challenger Pro League
- Season: 2025–26
- Champions: Beveren
- Promoted: Beveren; Kortrijk; Lommel
- Relegated: RWDM Brussels; Olympic Charleroi
- Matches: 97
- Goals: 269 (2.77 per match)
- All statistics correct as of 2 November 2025.

The 2025–26 season of the Challenger Pro League began in August 2025 and is scheduled to end in May 2026. It is the fourth season under its new name after being renamed from First Division B.

Originally, as per the vote of February 2025, the members of the Pro League had voted that the U23-teams playing in this division could not be relegated. This meant that in case one or two U23 teams ended in the relegation spots, the next highest non-U23 team would be relegated instead, unless a U23 of the same wing (ACFF: Francophone, VV: Flemish) ended in a promotion spot in the 2025–26 Belgian Division 1. In March 2026, the Belgian Competition Authority rules that this was an illegal and unfair measure compared to the non-U23 teams and that the Pro League was forced to pay a yearly fine of 12 million Euros until the rule was abolished. On 31 March 2026, the Pro League voted to abolish the rule from the 2026–27 season, but replaced it with a rule that, in case one or two U23 teams are relegated, replacement U23 team(s) should be promoted from the respective wing(s), to always keep the number of U23 teams in the division at a minimum of four. This would mean that newly promoted U23 teams, as a result of this rule, could be promoted instead of the (non-U23) amateur champions in their wing, despite ending much lower in the standings. The amateur organisations from both the Flemish and Francophone wings will now need to vote on this decision, and in case it is rejected, the Pro League will need to reconvene. Furthermore, the Pro League is investigating provisional measures so that non-U23 teams that would be relegated in the 2025–26 Challenger Pro League despite ending above a U23 team, do not have to be relegated this season. As a result of this, since the end of March 2026, it is unclear which (if any) team(s) will be relegated this season.

== Team changes ==
This season, two teams will be automatically promoted to Belgian Pro League and promotion play-off winner will be matched against last placed top tier team with no direct relegation due to top tier's expansion to 18 teams from 2026–27 onwards.

=== Incoming ===
- Olympic Charleroi and Jong KAA Gent were promoted from the 2024–25 Belgian Division 1, respectively as ACFF (Francophone) and VV (Flemish) champions. Olympic Charleroi return to the second tier after 17 years absence, while Jong KAA Gent make their debut at this level.
- Beerschot and Kortrijk were relegated from the 2024–25 Belgian Pro League. Beerschot immediately returned after just one season at the top level, while Kortrijk had been continuously at this level since 2008, ending their streak after 17 seasons.

=== Outgoing ===
- Zulte Waregem and La Louvière were promoted to the 2025–26 Belgian Pro League, respectively as champions and runners-up.
- Deinze dissolved mid-way through the last season.

=== Name change ===
- RWDM announced on 6 June 2025 that it would change name to Daring Brussels, a reference to the former now defunct club Daring Club de Bruxelles. However, following large protests by the fans, the club reinstated the letters RWDM and renamed itself again just one month later, to RWDM Brussels.
- Lokeren-Temse announced on 1 July 2025 that it would change its name to KSC Lokeren, reverting to the original name by which the former club KSC Lokeren Oost-Vlaanderen was initially known. While maintaining close cooperation with neighbors Temse, the two municipalities diverged in their football club support, with the supporters of Temse predominantly choosing to support SV Blauw Wit Temse, a club founded in 2020 when KSV Temse and KSC Lokeren Oost-Vlaanderen merged to form the current team.

=== Controversy about U23 participation and status ===
By the end of February 2025, the Pro League voted in favor of a new competition format for the coming seasons, with part of the haggling between club presidents resulting in a new rule for the then ongoing season (2024–25 Challenger Pro League) which entered with immediate effect, stating that a minimum of four U23 would always need to be present in the Challenger Pro League. At the time of the decision, there were still seven matchdays to play and Jong Genk was in a relegation spot, but due to this rule the club was anyhow spared of relegation. In the end, Jong Genk did finish in a relegation spot and was officially reported as being relegated, due to the fact that the new proposal had not yet passed all instances for approval. By the end of June approval was given and the club was officially spared. On 1 July 2025 however, Francs Borains, Lokeren and Seraing together launched a formal appeal against the reform citing it unfair that U23 cannot be relegated whilst non-U23 teams can. Meanwhile the new calendar, including Jong Genk, was already released on 3 July 2025. The Belgian Competition Authority ruled that they had a fair point, but somehow still ruled against them. Another similar appeal by Belgian champions Union SG is still open. On 9 October 2025, Francs Borains, Lokeren, and Seraing launched a new appeal, now with the Belgian Authority for Sports Arbitration.

In March 2026, the Belgian Competition Authority rules that this was an illegal and unfair measure compared to the non-U23 teams and that the Pro League was forced to pay a yearly fine of 12 million Euros until the rule was abolished. On 31 March 2026, the Pro League voted to abolish the rule from the 2026–27 season, but replaced it with a rule that, in case one or two U23 teams are relegated, replacement U23 team(s) should be promoted from the respective wing(s), to always keep the number of U23 teams in the division at a minimum of four. This would mean that newly promoted U23 teams, as a result of this rule, could be promoted instead of the (non-U23) amateur champions in their wing, despite ending much lower in the standings.

The amateur organisations from both the Flemish and Francophone wings will now need to vote on this decision, and in case it is rejected, the Pro League will need to reconvene. Furthermore, the Pro League is investigating provisional measures so that non-U23 teams that would be relegated in the 2025–26 Challenger Pro League despite ending above a U23 team, do not have to be relegated this season.

As a result of this, since the end of March 2026, it is unclear which (if any) team(s) will be relegated this season.

== Team information ==
=== Stadiums and locations ===
Locations of the 2025–26 Challenger Pro League teams

== Regular season ==
=== League table ===
Pos	Team	Pld	W	D	L	GF	GA	GD	Pts	Qualification
1	Beveren (C, P)	32	28	4	0	74	23	+51	88	Promoted to Pro League
2	Kortrijk (P)	32	21	4	7	59	33	+26	67	Promoted to Pro League
3	Beerschot	32	19	7	6	52	31	+21	64	Qualification for promotion play-offs
4	RFC Liège	32	16	5	11	44	39	+5	53	Qualification for promotion play-offs
5	Lommel (P)	32	15	8	9	59	46	+13	53	Qualification for promotion play-offs
6	Patro Eisden Maasmechelen	32	14	9	9	44	40	+4	51	Qualification for promotion play-offs
7	Eupen	32	12	11	9	44	36	+8	47	
8	Lokeren	32	10	12	10	45	45	0	42	
9	Jong KAA Gent^{U23} (Note: Ineligible for promotion or promotion play-offs; During the season, U23-teams also could not be relegated unless a U23-team from the same wing (ACFF/VV) finished in the top three of Division 1. However towards the end of the season, first the BMA (Belgian Competition Authority) had ruled that it was illegal to make some teams ineligible for relegation while others could be relegated, penalizing the Pro League (organization of professional football teams) with a yearly 12 million Euro fine as long as they kept the rule in place. Then, at the end of the season, the BMA intervened and abolished the rule themselves, overriding the authority of the Pro League by citing urgency. The urgency in this case being the precarious financial state of RWDM Brussels, which claimed to have found an investor who was willing to take over the club and prevent it from going bankrupt, under the condition that the club remained at the second level and did not get relegated to the amateur levels. As a result, with the rule abolished, RWDM Brussels would have remained in the Challenger Pro League and 16th-place finisher Club NXT would have been relegated instead. Two weeks later, RWDM Brussels was confirmed on appeal not to receive a professional football licence and hence was relegated to the Belgian Division 1, which meant Club NXT was spared after all. Another few weeks later, to avoid the fine, the Pro League voted to abolish the rule that prevented U23-teams to be relegated from the 2026-27 season. This puts the whole reform (removal of playoffs and return to 18 teams) under uncertainty, as this was allegedly voted as one package, and legal proceedings to reverse the decision have been started.)	32	12	5	15	42	51	−9	41	
10	Lierse	32	10	8	14	35	42	−7	38	
11	Seraing	32	8	11	13	37	44	−7	35	
12	Francs Borains	32	9	8	15	33	47	−14	34 (Note: For not complying with the rules of financial stability, in February 2025 it was announced that Francs Borains were to be deducted 1 point from the start of the 2025–26 season.)	
13	RSCA Futures^{U23}	32	7	10	15	46	55	−9	31	
14	Jong Genk^{U23}	32	7	10	15	42	59	−17	31	
15	Club NXT^{U23}	32	5	6	21	33	55	−22	21	
16	Olympic Charleroi (R)	32	3	7	22	26	68	−42	16	Relegated to Belgian Division 1
17	RWDM Brussels (Note: RWDM was not granted a license for either First Division B or Division 1 for the 2026-27 season. As a result, the club is relegated to the Second Division and is considered to have finished last. As a result, Club NXT was spared of relegation.) (R)	32	9	9	14	50	54	−4	33 (Note: After already having been penalized with one point for the coming 2026–27 season, on 3 March 2026 RWDM Brussels was also penalized three points with immediate effect for not being able to prove that certain debts had been paid before the deadline of 2 March 2026.)	Relegated to Belgian Division 1

Source: Challenger Pro League
Rules for classification: 1) Points; 2) Matches won; 3) Goal difference; 4) Goals scored; 5) Away matches won; 6) Away goal difference; 7) Away goals made.
(C) Champions; (P) Promoted; (R) Relegated

=== Positions by round ===
The table lists the positions of teams after each round, with postponed matches and points deductions included only when they occur. Teams with fewer matches played are shown with their position underlined, with each line representing one fewer match.

- Midway through the previous season, Francs Borains was penalized one point for not complying with financial fair-play.
- The match between Jong Genk and RSCA Futures of 8 November (matchday 13) was postponed to 9 December (between matchdays 16 and 17) as Jong Genk had four players selected for the 2025 FIFA U-17 World Cup.
- On 15 February 2026 (matchday 25), the match between Jong KAA Gent and Olympic Charleroi was stopped after 53 minutes at a score of 1–1 due to excessive snow. The day after, it was decided the match was to be continued from minute 53 and will be played on 24 February 2026, between matchdays 26 and 27.
- On 21 February 2026 (matchday 26), the match between Seraing and Kortrijk was postponed for safety reasons as there was a neighbouring restaurant on fire. A few weeks later, during matchday 29, Kortrijk was awarded a 0–3 forfeit away win as Seraing was deemed not to have done enough to allow the match to be played.
- On 3 March 2026 (between matchdays 27 and 28), RWDM Brussels was penalized three points for being unable to prove payment of debts.

Colored cells indicate promotion (green), participation in promotion play-offs (yellow), or relegation play-offs (red). Note that U23 teams are ineligible for promotion and playoffs, and the coloring is adjusted accordingly. Furthermore, these teams can only relegate if at the same time another U23 team from the same wing (ACFF or VV) qualifies for promotion from the league below, or if the mother club is relegated from the level above, in which case the U23 would automatically take up one of the relegation spots as U23 teams always have to remain at least one level below their mother club. In the table below, it is assumed that the U23 teams will stay up, and hence the two lowest non-U23 teams are assumed to be relegated.

Team ╲ Round	1	2	3	4	5	6	7	8	9	10	11	12	13	14	15	16	17	18	19	20	21	22	23	24	25	26	27	28	29	30	31	32	33	34
Beveren	3	2	2	2	1	1	1	1	1	1	1	1	1	1	1	1	1	1	1	1	1	1	1	1	1	1	1	1	1	1	1	1	1	1
Kortrijk	2	1	1	1	2	2	2	2	2	2	2	2	2	2	2	2	2	2	2	2	2	2	2	2	2	2	2	2	2	2	2	2	2	2
Beerschot	5	6	6	5	4	3	3	3	3	3	3	3	3	3	3	3	3	3	3	3	4	4	3	3	3	4	3	3	3	3	3	3	3	3
RFC Liège	16	9	3	7	6	6	6	6	5	4	4	4	4	4	5	4	5	7	6	5	6	6	6	4	6	5	5	6	6	6	6	6	5	4
Lommel	7	3	5	4	3	4	4	4	4	5	6	5	5	6	6	6	6	4	4	4	3	3	4	6	5	3	4	4	4	4	4	4	4	5
Patro Eisden Maasmechelen	6	11	4	3	7	7	7	5	6	6	7	7	7	5	4	5	4	6	7	6	5	5	5	5	4	6	6	5	5	5	5	5	6	6
Eupen	4	5	9	6	5	5	5	7	7	7	5	6	6	7	7	7	7	5	5	7	8	7	7	7	7	7	8	7	7	7	7	7	7	7
Lokeren	13	14	16	16	13	15	15	15	12	13	10	10	11	10	9	8	9	8	9	9	9	9	9	9	8	9	9	9	10	9	9	9	8	8
Jong KAA Gent (Note: ineligible for promotion and playoffs. Can only be relegated if they finish in a relegation spot, and at the same time, in the 2025–26 Division 1, a U23 team from the same wing (ACFF or VV) qualifies for promotion.)	1	7	7	11	9	9	8	9	9	9	9	9	8	8	8	10	10	10	8	8	7	8	8	8	9	8	7	8	8	8	8	8	9	9
Lierse	15	16	12	14	15	11	12	11	11	12	13	13	10	11	11	9	8	8 9	10	10	10	11	11	11	11	11	11	10	9	10	10	10	10	10
Seraing	12	15	15	12	12	14	14	14	15	15	15	15	15	15	15	15	15	15	15	15	15	14	15	15	15	15	15	13	12	11	11	11	11	11
Francs Borains	10	8	8	9	11	13	13	13	14	14	14	14	14	12	10	12	12	12	12	12	12	12	12	12	12	12	13	14	14	14	13	12	12	12
RWDM Brussels	8	4	10	8	8	8	9	8	8	8	8	8	9	9	12	11	11	11	11	11	11	10	10	10	10	10	10	11	11	12	12	13	13	13
RSCA Futures	14	10	11	13	14	12	10	10	10	11	12	12	13	14	14	13	14	14	14	14	14	13	14	13	14	13	12	12	13	13	15	15	15	14
Jong Genk	11	13	14	10	10	10	11	12	13	10	11	11	12	13	13	14	13	13	13	13	13	15	13	14	13	14	14	15	15	15	14	14	14	15
Club NXT	9	12	13	15	16	16	16	16	16	16	16	16	17	17	17	17	17	17	17	17	17	16	16	16	16	16	16	16	16	16	16	16	16	16
Olympic Charleroi	17	17	17	17	17	17	17	17	17	17	17	17	16	16	16	16	16	16	16	16	16	17	17	17	17	17	17	17	17	17	17	17	17	17

Source: vbal4.be

=== Results ===
Home \ Away	BEV	KOR	BEE	LOM	RFC	PEM	EUP	LOK	GNT	LIE	SER	FRB	RWD	GNK	AND	NXT	OLC
Beveren		1–0	4–2	2–0	4–0	2–1	1–1	1–0	3–0	1–0	2–1	1–0	3–2	1–0	2–1	2–1	2–0
Kortrijk	1–3		1–0	4–2	3–1	2–0	1–0	3–2	2–0	1–0	1–0	2–0	3–1	4–1	5–2	1–1	3–1
Beerschot	1–1	1–2		2–1	3–0	0–2	1–1	1–0	1–2	1–0	0–0	4–1	1–1	1–0	4–2	2–1	2–1
Lommel	2–2	1–1	1–2		0–1	1–1	3–2	3–1	2–0	4–3	0–1	3–1	3–2	1–2	2–0	0–1	3–0
RFC Liège	1–2	2–0	0–1	1–0		0–2	2–1	0–1	0–2	2–1	2–0	3–1	4–3	5–0	1–1	3–2	2–1
Patro Eisden Maasmechelen	1–4	1–0	0–4	0–2	1–1		0–1	2–1	2–1	2–1	2–2	4–0	1–0	4–4	0–0	2–1	1–0
Eupen	1–2	1–0	3–3	1–2	2–0	0–0		1–1	4–0	0–1	0–0	1–1	2–2	2–1	1–0	2–1	2–2
Lokeren	1–2	1–1	0–0	2–3	0–1	1–1	3–3		4–1	2–0	1–1	2–2	1–3	2–2	4–2	3–2	1–1
Jong KAA Gent	2–4	2–3	1–1	2–2	0–2	2–1	2–1	1–3		0–0	3–1	1–0	0–2	0–0	0–1	3–2	1–3 (Note: Match stopped on 15 February 2026 at a score of 1–1 with 53 minutes played due to excessive snow. The match was continued two weeks later on 27 February 2026.)
Lierse	0–2	0–0	1–2	4–4	1–2	1–2	3–2	1–1	1–3		0–1	0–2	2–0	2–1	1–0	2–1	0–0
Seraing	1–2	0–3 FF (Note: Match initially postponed on 21 February 2026 due to a fire at a neighbouring restaurant. Later, Kortrijk was awarded a forfeit win as Seraing had not done enough to allow the match to be played.)	1–2	2–3	2–2	2–0	0–1	1–1	0–2	1–1		4–0	3–1	2–2	1–2	1–0	3–1
Francs Borains	0–2	4–1	0–2	0–0	2–0	2–0	0–3	1–0	2–0	0–1	0–0		0–0	2–2	3–3	1–0	0–1
RWDM Brussels	0–2	1–2	0–1	3–3	0–3	2–4	2–2	1–2	1–0	1–1	5–0	1–3		1–1	2–1	3–1	3–3
Jong Genk	1–2	1–3	0–2	0–2	2–0	1–4	2–0	2–2	1–1	2–3	0–0	3–1	0–2		3–2 (Note: The match between Jong Genk and RSCA Futures of 8 November (matchday 13) was postponed to 9 December (between matchdays 16 and 17) as Jong Genk had four players selected for the 2025 FIFA U-17 World Cup.)	0–0	3–4
RSCA Futures	0–5	1–3	0–2	2–2	0–0	0–0	0–1	1–2	1–2	2–2	2–2	2–0	2–2	2–1		2–2	5–0
Club NXT	2–2	2–0	3–1	0–2	0–2	2–3	0–1	1–2	0–4	0–1	1–0	1–1	0–1	1–2	0–5		1–1
Olympic Charleroi	0–5	0–3	1–2	1–2	1–1	0–0	0–1	0–1	1–4	0–1	2–4	0–3	0–2	1–2	0–2	0–3	

Source: Flashscore
Legend: Blue = home team win; Yellow = draw; Red = away team win.

== Promotion play-offs ==
=== Promotion/relegation play-offs ===
The promotion/relegation play-offs will be contested by the four highest-eligible finishers who are not already promoted directly. Normally, this will be the teams in positions 3 to 6 in the 2025–26 Challenger Pro League, unless one of the U23-teams would end up in the top six positions, in which case the next eligible team will take their spot. These four teams are to meet in a knockout tournament with both quarter-finals and semi-finals over two legs, and the highest season finisher always has home advantage in the return leg. The winner of the semi-finals will play the 16th place finisher of the 2025–26 Belgian Pro League over two legs. The Belgian Pro League team will have home advantage in the return leg; the winner of the final will qualify to play in the 2026–27 Belgian Pro League, with the loser playing in the 2026–27 Challenger Pro League.

==== Bracket ====
Quarter-finals
6	Patro Eisden Maasmechelen	1	2	3
3	Beerschot (a.e.t.)	1	3	4
5	Lommel	3	2	5
4	RFC Liège	0	1	1

Semi-finals
3	Beerschot	1	1	2
5	Lommel	3	3	6

Final
16	Dender	2	0	2
5	Lommel	3	0	3

==== Quarter-finals ====
23 April 2026
20:30 CEST

Patro Eisden Maasmechelen	1–1	Beerschot
Renson 18'		Brahic 90+3'

Gemeentelijk Sportparkstadion, Maasmechelen
27 April 2026
20:30 CEST

Beerschot	3–2 (a.e.t.)	Patro Eisden Maasmechelen
Plat 2' (pen.); Brahic 90+2'; Haraguchi 116'	Report	Asante 48'; Nainggolan 63'

Olympisch Stadion, Antwerp
Referee: Simon Bourdeaud'Hui

Beerschot won 4–3 on aggregate.

23 April 2026
20:30 CEST

Lommel	3–0	RFC Liège
Schoofs 12'; van Duiven 17'; de Grand 50'

Soevereinstadion, Lommel
27 April 2026
20:30 CEST

RFC Liège	1–2	Lommel
Hazard 29'		Vancsa 8', 18'

Stade de Rocourt, Liège

Lommel won 5–1 on aggregate.

==== Semi-finals ====
2 May 2026
20:00 CEST

Lommel	3–1	Beerschot
Schoofs 14'; Reyners 15'; de Grand 85'		Van Eenoo 24'

Soevereinstadion, Lommel
9 May 2026
18:15 CEST

Beerschot	1–3	Lommel
Wright-Phillips 83'	Report	van Duiven 48'; Schoofs 74'; Vancsa 76'

Olympisch Stadion, Antwerp

Lommel won 6–2 on aggregate.

==== Finals ====
17 May 2026
16:00 CEST

Lommel	3–2	Dender
Seuntjens 55', 86'; Vancsa 90+6'	Report	Acquah 34'; Berte 83'

Soevereinstadion, Lommel
Attendance: 6,090
Referee: Wesli De Cremer
23 May 2026
18:15 CEST

Dender	0–0	Lommel

Dender Football Complex, Denderleeuw

Lommel won 3–2 on aggregate.

== Season statistics ==
=== Top scorers ===
As of 6 November 2025.

Rank	Player	Club	Goals
1	(Belgium) Lennart Mertens	Beveren	8
2	(France) Gaëtan Robail	RWDM Brussels	7
3	(Guadeloupe) Thierry Ambrose	Kortrijk	6
3	(Senegal) Oumar Diouf	RFC Liège	6
3	(Belgium) Lucas Schoofs	Lommel	6
6	(Cameroon) Aaron Bibout	Jong Genk	5
6	(Ghana) Isaac Nuhu	Eupen	5
6	(Belgium) Leandro Rousseau	Patro Eisden Maasmechelen	5
6	(Belgium) Jannes Van Hecke	Beveren	5
10	(Madagascar) Bryan Adinany	Lierse	4
10	(Belgium) Mohamed Salah	Lommel	4
10	(Netherlands) Ralf Seuntjens	Lommel	4
10	(Central African Republic) Usman Simbakoli	RWDM Brussels	4
10	(Belgium) Yentl Van Genechten	Eupen	4

3 goals (14 players)
- (Belgium) Bas Van den Eynden (Beerschot)
- (Netherlands) Rajiv van La Parra (Beerschot)
- (Democratic Republic of the Congo) Arnold Vula (Beerschot)
- (Belgium) Thibaut Van Acker (Club NXT)
- (France) Logan Delaurier-Chaubet (Eupen)
- (Belgium) Luca Oyen (Jong Genk)
- (Senegal) El Hadji Seck (Jong KAA Gent)
- (Belgium) Lennard Hens (Kortrijk)
- (Belgium) Jellert Van Landschoot (Kortrijk)
- (Belgium) Tom Reyners (Lommel)
- (Belgium) Alexis De Sart (RFC Liège)
- (Belgium) Pjotr Kestens (RWDM Brussels)
- (Serbia) Mihajlo Cvetković (RSCA Futures)
- (France) Édouard Soumah-Abbad (Seraing)
2 goals (28 players)
- (France) Loïc Mbe Soh (Beerschot)
- (Belgium) Lukas Van Eenoo (Beerschot)
- (Belgium) Bruno Godeau (Beveren)
- (Curaçao) Jearl Margaritha (Beveren)
- (France) Ilyes Najim (Beveren)
- (Spain) Alejandro Granados (Club NXT)
- (Belgium) Jakke Van Britsom (Club NXT)
- (Belgium) Zakaria Atteri (Eupen)
- (Belgium) Dorian Dessoleil (Francs Borains)
- (Sweden) Lucas Lima (Francs Borains)
- (Austria) Philipp Wydra (Francs Borains)
- (Nigeria) Victory Beniangba (Jong Genk)
- (Nigeria) Abubakar Abdullahi (Jong KAA Gent)
- (Belgium) Mohammed El Âdfaoui (Jong KAA Gent)
- (Belgium) Boris Lambert (Kortrijk)
- (Belgium) Manuel Osifo (Kortrijk)
- (Belgium) Pietro Perdichizzi (Lierse)
- (Belgium) Toon Janssen (Lokeren)
- (Belgium) Radja Nainggolan (Lokeren)
- (Ghana) Sumaila Wasiu (Lokeren)
- (Burundi) Vancy Mabanza (Patro Eisden Maasmechelen)
- (France) Alexis Lefebvre (RFC Liège)
- (Belgium) Devon De Corte (RSCA Futures)
- (Belgium) Joshua Nga Kana (RSCA Futures)
- (Belgium) Samuel Ntanda (RSCA Futures)
- (Belgium) Djovkar Doudaev (RWDM Brussels)
- (Morocco) Ilyes Ziani (RWDM Brussels)
- (France) Abdoulaye Ba (Seraing)
1 goal (63 players)
- (Serbia) Ensar Brahic (Beerschot)
- (Belgium) Glenn Claes (Beerschot)
- (France) Sabri Guendouz (Beerschot)
- (Bulgaria) Edisson Jordanov (Beerschot)
- (South Africa) Kurt Abrahams (Beveren)
- (Japan) Yutaka Michiwaki (Beveren)
- (Belgium) Mathis Servais (Beveren)
- (Belgium) Ferre Slegers (Beveren)
- (Denmark) Tobias Lund-Jensen (Club NXT)
- (Belgium) Yanis Musuayi (Club NXT)
- (France) Nathan Bitumazala (Eupen)
- (Belgium) Bertan Caliskan (Eupen)
- (France) Maxime Bastian (Francs Borains)
- (Belgium) Massimo Bruno (Francs Borains)
- (Belgium) Jordy Soladio (Francs Borains)
- (Belgium) Jasper Van Oudenhove (Francs Borains)
- (Belgium) Arsène Wukanya (Francs Borains)
- (Belgium) Simon Buggea (Jong KAA Gent)
- (Belgium) David Mukuna-Trouet (Jong KAA Gent)
- (Guinea) Mohamed Soumah (Jong KAA Gent)
- (Ukraine) Ruslan Vydysh (Jong KAA Gent)
- (Belgium) Lenn De Smet (Kortrijk)
- (Senegal) Mouhamed Guèye (Kortrijk)
- (France) Rudy Kohon (Kortrijk)
- (Cameroon) James Ndjeungoue (Kortrijk)
- (Nigeria) Sixtus Ogbuehi (Kortrijk)
- (Philippines) Dylan Demuynck (Lierse)
- (Belgium) Samih El Touile (Lierse)
- (Belgium) Mauro Lenaerts (Lierse)
- (Belgium) Emmanuel Matuta (Lierse)
- (Belgium) Jenthe Mertens (Lierse)
- (Spain) Diego Cámara (Lokeren)
- (Belgium) Matias Lloci (Lokeren)
- (Spain) Jordi Palacios (Lokeren)
- (Belgium) Mohamed Soumaré (Lokeren)
- (Belgium) Jonas Vinck (Lokeren)
- (Colombia) Jhon Banguera (Lommel)
- (England) Timothy Eyoma (Lommel)
- (Indonesia) Joey Pelupessy (Lommel)
- (Belgium) Nicolas Rommens (Lommel)
- (Netherlands) Jason van Duiven (Lommel)
- (Romania) Luca Florică (Olympic Charleroi)
- (Romania) Robert Ion (Olympic Charleroi)
- (Netherlands) Toshio Lake (Olympic Charleroi)
- (Tunisia) Mohamed Medfai (Olympic Charleroi)
- (Belgium) Kjetil Borry (Patro Eisden Maasmechelen)
- (Dominican Republic) Jimmy Kaparos (Patro Eisden Maasmechelen)
- (Belgium) Ridwane M'Barki (Patro Eisden Maasmechelen)
- (Belgium) Milan Robberechts (Patro Eisden Maasmechelen)
- (Belgium) Jonathan D'Ostilio (RFC Liège)
- (Belgium) Lucca Lucker (RFC Liège)
- (Argentina) Darío Sarmiento (RFC Liège)
- (Belgium) Naoufal Bohamdi-Kamoni (RSCA Futures)
- (Belgium) Nunzio Engwanda (RSCA Futures)
- (Mali) Ibrahim Kanaté (RSCA Futures)
- (Belgium) Terry Van De Ven (RSCA Futures)
- (Belgium) Noah Dodeigne (RWDM Brussels)
- (Brazil) Vitor Sapata (RWDM Brussels)
- (Paraguay) Matías Segovia (RWDM Brussels)
- (Belgium) Hemsley Akpa-Chukwu (Seraing)
- (Algeria) Nabil Bouchentouf (Seraing)
- (Belgium) Valerio Di Crescenzo (Seraing)
- (Belgium) Noah Solheid (Seraing)
1 own goal (5 players)
- (Belgium) Bruno Godeau (Beveren, scored for Seraing)
- (Nigeria) Vince Osuji (Club NXT, scored for RFC Liège)
- (Senegal) Mamadou Diallo (Jong KAA Gent, scored for Francs Borains)
- (Ghana) Antwi Dacosta (RSCA Futures, scored for Lokeren)
- (Belgium) Dries Wouters (Lommel, scored for Beerschot)
2 own goals (1 player)
- (Belgium) Pietro Perdichizzi (Lierse, scored twice for Lommel)

== Number of teams by provinces ==
Number of teams	Province or region	Team(s)
3	East Flanders	Beveren, Jong KAA Gent and Lokeren
3	Liège	Eupen, RFC Liège and Seraing
3	Limburg	Jong Genk, Lommel and Patro Eisden Maasmechelen
2	Antwerp	Beerschot and Lierse
2	Brussels	RSCA Futures and RWDM Brussels
2	Hainaut	Francs Borains and Olympic Charleroi
2	West Flanders	Club NXT and Kortrijk

== See also ==
- 2025–26 Belgian Pro League
- 2025–26 Belgian Division 1
- 2025–26 Belgian Division 2
- 2025–26 Belgian Division 3
- 2025–26 Belgian Cup
