= Kiany Vroman =

Belgian association football player

Personal information
- Date of birth: 21 January 2004 (age 22)
- Place of birth: Ghent, Belgium
- Height: 1.89 m (6 ft 2 in)
- Position: Goalkeeper

Team information
- Current team: OH Leuven
- Number: 13

Youth career
- 2009–2013: Wingene
- 2013–2022: Club Brugge

Senior career*
Years	Team	Apps	(Gls)
2021–2025	Club NXT	1	(0)
2025–2026	Lierse	22	(0)
2026–	OH Leuven	1	(0)

International career^{‡}
2019	Belgium U15	0	(0)
- * Club domestic league appearances and goals as of 11 October 2026 ‡ National team caps and goals as of 7 September 2026

Kiany Vroman (born 21 January 2004) is a Belgian professional footballer who plays for OH Leuven in the Belgian Pro League.

== Career ==
Vroman is a youth exponent of Club Brugge, and made his professional debut for Club NXT in the Challenger Pro League on 14 March 2021 at just 17 years of age, when he was subbed in to replace the injured Nick Shinton after 21 minutes in a 0–1 home loss to Seraing, with Vroman saving a penalty in the last few minutes of the match. Despite remaining with Club NXT until 2025 and being on the match sheet another 34 times as substitute goalkeeper, this would be his only match for the club, as he was competing with (amongst others) Senne Lammens, Nick Shinton, Josef Bursik and Dani van den Heuvel. Vroman signed for Lierse in 2025 where he became the first choice goalkeeper, making 22 league appearances and 2 in the Belgian Cup. On the final day of the 2026 summer transfer window, Vroman was signed by OH Leuven to replace Tobe Leysen who moved from OH Leuven to Genk that same day.
