= Geoffrey Mujangi Bia =

Belgian footballer

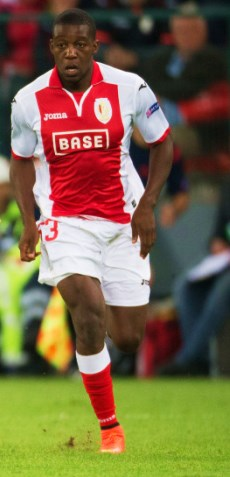

Personal information
- Date of birth: 12 August 1989 (age 37)
- Place of birth: Kinshasa, Zaire
- Height: 1.78 m (5 ft 10 in)
- Positions: Attacking midfielder; winger

Youth career
- Union Saint-Gilloise
- Anderlecht

Senior career*
Years	Team	Apps	(Gls)
2006–2011	Charleroi	59	(9)
2010–2011	→ Wolverhampton Wanderers (loan)	4	(0)
2011–2015	Standard Liège	88	(25)
2012–2013	→ Watford (loan)	3	(0)
2015–2017	Sion	35	(13)
2017–2018	Kayserispor	5	(0)
2018	→ Akhisar Belediyespor (loan)	4	(0)
2018–2019	Lokeren	4	(0)
2019–2020	Maccabi Petah Tikva	5	(1)
2022	Virton	7	(0)
2023	Mandel United	17	(4)
2023–2025	FC Ganshoren	48	(11)

International career
2009	Belgium U20	1	(0)
2009–2010	Belgium U21	7	(2)
2009	Belgium	2	(0)
- * Club domestic league appearances and goals as of 6 February 2022

Geoffrey Mujangi Bia (born 12 August 1989) is a Belgian international footballer who plays as a winger.

He established himself in Belgian football with Charleroi before experiencing the English Premier League with a loan spell at Wolverhampton Wanderers. In 2011, he returned to Belgium to join Standard Liège.

== Club career ==
Mujangi Bia emigrated with his family from DR Congo to Zellik, Belgium as a young child. He began his football career on the books of the Brussels-based club Union Saint-Gilloise, before being spotted by Anderlecht. Although one of their academy's most promising players, he was released by the club.

After some months without a club, he joined Charleroi where he made his professional debut on 17 December 2006 in 0–1 defeat at Zulte Waregem, the first of three appearances that season. He scored his first senior goals the following season (3), before 2008–09 saw his most appearances yet as he played 28 league games.

The midfielder joined English Premier League club Wolverhampton Wanderers on loan on 21 January 2010 for the remainder of the 2009–10 season. He made his debut in the FA Cup against Crystal Palace on 23 January 2010. His Premier League debut followed as a substitute in a 2–2 draw at Hull City, one of three league appearances that season. At the season's end it was announced he would also spend the 2010–11 season with Wolves.

Mujangi Bia failed to break into Wolves' first team plans during the next season, making just one league appearance, as a late substitute at Manchester City. He scored his only goal for Wolves in a 5–0 FA Cup victory over Championship team Doncaster Rovers. In April 2011 it was announced that he would transfer to Standard Liège on a three-year deal once the transfer window re-opened in the summer.

The winger featured for Standard throughout the 2011–12 season as the club ended in fifth place. However, in August 2012, he was told he was no longer involved in the club's plans, and on 25 August signed for English Championship club Watford on a season-long loan deal, having already agreed to a long-term permanent contract; this will commence in summer 2013 if this option is exercised by Watford.

He made his Watford debut on 28 August 2012 in their League Cup exit to eventual finalists Bradford. After making two league appearances for Watford in the early part of the season, Bia made his first league appearance since the back end of 2012 as a substitute in a 0–1 defeat to Barnsley on 16 March 2013.

During the 2014–15 season Bia scored 14 and created a further 7 goals for Standard Liège. However, after a row with coach Slavoljub Muslin Bia found himself in the B team. During the summer of 2015 a proposed move to Bursaspor fell through after they announced the signing of Hungarian Dzsudzsák. Finally Bia signed a three-year deal with Swiss side Sion.

On 10 May 2018, Bia helped Akhisar Belediyespor win their first professional trophy, the 2017–18 Turkish Cup.

On 5 February 2018 Bia was fired by his club KSC Lokeren on "grounds of urgency".

After not playing in 2021, on 28 January 2022 Mujangi Bia joined Virton.

== International career ==
Mujangi Bia turned down his birthplace DR Congo to instead represent the Belgium national football team. He made his international debut on 29 May 2009 in a Kirin Cup draw against Chile. He has previously also played for Belgium at under-21 level.

== Personal life ==
Mujangi Bia's son Adjani Mujangi Bia is also a professional footballer.

== Honours ==
Akhisarspor

- Turkish Cup (1): 2017–18

== Career statistics ==
As of match played on 13 April 2018

Appearances and goals by club, season and competition
Club	Season	League			Cup		Other		Total	
Club	Season	Division	Apps	Goals	Apps	Goals	Apps	Goals	Apps	Goals
Sporting Charleroi	2006–07	Belgian First Division A	3	0	0	0	0	0	3	0
Sporting Charleroi	2007–08	Belgian First Division A	17	3	0	0	0	0	17	3
Sporting Charleroi	2008–09	Belgian First Division A	29	4	0	0	0	0	29	4
Sporting Charleroi	2009–10	Belgian Pro League	10	2	2	0	0	0	12	2
Sporting Charleroi	Total		59	9	2	0	0	0	61	9
Wolverhampton Wanderers (loan)	2009–10	Premier League	3	0	2	0	0	0	5	0
Wolverhampton Wanderers (loan)	2010–11	Premier League	1	0	2	1	0	0	3	1
Wolverhampton Wanderers (loan)	Total		4	0	4	1	0	0	8	1
Standard Liège	2011–12	Belgian Pro League	23	2	2	0	6 (Note: Appearances in UEFA Europa League)	0	31	2
Standard Liège	2012–13	Belgian Pro League	1	0	0	0	0	0	1	0
Standard Liège	2013–14	Belgian Pro League	30	9	1	0	10	5	41	14
Standard Liège	2014–15	Belgian Pro League	34	14	1	0	9 (Note: Five appearances in UEFA Champions League, Four appearances in UEFA Champions League)	0	44	14
Standard Liège	Total		88	25	4	0	25	5	117	30
Watford (loan)	2012–13	EFL Championship	3	0	2	0	0	0	6	0
Sion	2015–16	Swiss Super League	19	7	2	1	6	0	27	8
Sion	2016–17	Swiss Super League	16	6	2	2	0	0	18	8
Sion	Total		35	13	4	3	6	0	45	16
Kayserispor	2017–18	Süper Lig	5	0	3	1	0	0	8	1
Akhisarspor (loan)	2017–18	Süper Lig	4	0	0	0	0	0	4	0
Career totals			198	47	19	5	31	5	248	57
