= Fabio Ferraro =

Belgian association football player

Personal information
- Date of birth: 3 September 2002 (age 24)
- Place of birth: Halle, Belgium
- Height: 1.80 m (5 ft 11 in)
- Position: Forward

Team information
- Current team: Westerlo
- Number: 88

Youth career
- Mons
- 2015–2016: Royal Excel Mouscron
- 2016–2018: Tubize-Braine
- 2018–2019: Royal Excel Mouscron
- 2019–2021: Charleroi

Senior career*
| Years | Team | Apps | (Gls) |
| 2021–2022 | Charleroi | 2 | (0) |
| 2022–2023 | RWDM | 15 | (0) |
| 2023–2026 | Dender EH | 84 | (2) |
| 2026– | Westerlo | 0 | (0) |

International career^{‡}
| 2018 | Belgium U16 | 3 | (2) |
| 2019 | Belgium U17 | 4 | (3) |
- * Club domestic league appearances and goals as of 15 August 2026 ‡ National team caps and goals as of 28 January 2019

Fabio Ferraro (born 3 September 2002) is a Belgian professional footballer who plays as a forward for Belgian Pro League club Westerlo.

== Club career ==
Ferraro is a youth product of the academies of Mons, Royal Excel Mouscron, Tubize-Braine and Charleroi. He made his professional debut with Charleroi in a 3–1 Belgian First Division A loss to Seraing on 22 October 2021.

On 17 July 2022, Ferraro signed a two-year contract with RWDM.

On 3 August 2023, Ferraro moved to Dender EH on a two-year contract.

On 21 July 2026, Ferraro joined Westerlo on a three-season deal.
