= Robin Mirisola =

Belgian association football player

Personal information
- Date of birth: 8 December 2006 (age 19)
- Place of birth: Sint-Truiden, Belgium
- Height: 1.84 m (6 ft 0 in)
- Position: Forward

Team information
- Current team: OH Leuven (on loan from Genk)
- Number: 18

Youth career
- 2011–2012: Zepperen
- 2012–2023: Genk

Senior career*
Years	Team	Apps	(Gls)
2023–2026	Jong Genk	49	(13)
2025–	Genk	31	(5)
2026–	→ OH Leuven (loan)	7	(2)

International career^{‡}
2021–2022	Belgium U16	6	(1)
2022–2023	Belgium U17	9	(3)
2023–2024	Belgium U18	6	(2)
2024	Belgium U19	4	(0)
2026–	Belgium U21	7	(2)
- * Club domestic league appearances and goals as of 8 November 2026 ‡ National team caps and goals as of 15:31, 18 November 2026 (UTC)

Robin Mirisola (born 8 December 2006) is a Belgian professional footballer who plays for OH Leuven in the Belgian Pro League, on loan from Genk.

== Career ==
Mirisola is a youth exponent of Genk, and made his professional debut for Jong Genk in the Challenger Pro League on 31 March 2023, when he was subbed in to replace Cédric Nuozzi, with about ten minutes to play in the 1–0 loss away to Dender EH. Mirisola featured regularly in the Jong Genk squad during the 2023–24 and 2024–25 season in the Challenger Pro League, before joing the A-squad of Genk. As well as playing in 30 league matches for Genk in the Belgian Pro League in 2025–26, Mirisola also played in 8 matches in the 2025–26 UEFA Europa League. At the start of the 2026–27 season, on the final day of the summer 2026 transfer window, Mirisola moved on loan to Oud-Heverlee Leuven to reassure more playing minutes. He debuted for OH Leuven just three days later as he was subbed on for Chukwubuikem Ikwuemesi with about 20 minutes to play in a 3–0 loss away to Beveren.
