= Abdoul Ayinde =

Burkinabé footballer

Personal information
- Full name: Abdoul Rachid Ayinde
- Date of birth: 17 July 2005 (age 21)
- Place of birth: Bobo-Dioulasso, Burkina Faso
- Height: 1.83 m (6 ft 0 in)
- Position: Left-back

Team information
- Current team: Gent
- Number: 39

Youth career
- Rahimo

Senior career*
Years	Team	Apps	(Gls)
2022–2023	Rahimo	20	(1)
2023–	Jong Gent	56	(1)
2024–	Gent	5	(0)

International career^{‡}
2025–	Burkina Faso	3	(0)
- * Club domestic league appearances and goals as of 18 September 2026 ‡ National team caps and goals as of 23:13, 7 October 2025 (UTC)

Abdoul Rachid Ayinde (born 17 July 2005) is a Burkinabé professional footballer who plays as a left-back for the Belgian Pro League club Gent, and the Burkina Faso national team.

== Club career ==
A youth product of the Burkinabe club Rahimo, Ayinde debuted with them in the Burkinabe Premier League in 2022 where he made 20 appearances and scored 1 goal. He joined the Gent on 18 July 2023 on a 3-year contract, and was assigned to their reserves. He debuted with the senior Gent side in a 2–1 loss to Cercle Brugge on 11 February 2024. On 8 May 2025, he extended his contract with Gent until 2027. He helped Jong KAA Gent win the 2024–25 Belgian Division 1, earning promotion to the Challenger Pro League.

== International career ==
Ayinde was first caelled up to the Burkina Faso national team for a set of friendlies in June 2025.

== Career statistics ==
=== Club ===
As of match played 18 October 2026

Appearances and goals by club, season and competition
Club	Season	League			Cup		Continental		Other		Total	
Club	Season	Division	Apps	Goals	Apps	Goals	Apps	Goals	Apps	Goals	Apps	Goals
Rahimo	2022–23	Burkinabé Premier League	20	1	—		—		—		20	1
Jong Gent	2023–24	Belgian Division 1	15	1	—		—		—		15	1
Jong Gent	2024–25	Belgian Division 1	29	0	—		—		—		29	0
Jong Gent	2025–26	Challenger Pro League	9	0	—		—		—		9	0
Jong Gent	Total		53	1	—		—		—		53	1
Gent	2023–24	Belgian Pro League	1	0	—		—		—		1	0
Gent	2025–26	Belgian Pro League	2	0	0	0	—		—		2	0
Gent	2026–27	Belgian Pro League	2	0	1	0	0	0	—		3	0
Gent	Total		5	0	1	0	0	0	0	0	6	0
Career total			78	2	1	0	0	0	0	0	79	2

=== International ===
As of match played 7 October 2025

Appearances and goals by national team and year
National team	Year	Apps	Goals
Burkina Faso	2025	3	0
Total		3	0

== Honours ==
Jong KAA Gent

- Belgian Division 1: 2024–25
