= Sam de Grand =

Dutch footballer (born 2004)

Personal information
- Date of birth: 5 October 2004 (age 22)
- Place of birth: 's-Hertogenbosch, Netherlands
- Height: 1.78 m (5 ft 10 in)
- Position: Left-back

Team information
- Current team: Lommel (on loan from AZ)
- Number: 79

Youth career
- 2009–2013: OH Leuven
- 2013–2016: Anderlecht
- 2016–2022: Genk

Senior career*
Years	Team	Apps	(Gls)
2022–2023	Jong Genk	2	(0)
2023–2026	Lommel	73	(3)
2026–	AZ	0	(0)
2026–	Jong AZ	3	(0)
2026–	→ Lommel (loan)	2	(0)

International career^{‡}
2022	Netherlands U18	1	(1)
2025–	Netherlands U21	2	(0)
- * Club domestic league appearances and goals as of 19 September 2026 ‡ National team caps and goals as of 30 March 2026

Sam de Grand (born 5 October 2004) is a Dutch professional footballer who plays as a left-back for Belgian Pro League club Lommel on loan from Dutch club AZ.

== Early life ==
De Grand was born on 5 October 2004 in 's-Hertogenbosch, Netherlands. When he was one month old, his family relocated to Leuven, Belgium, after his father took up a position at Canon, and he grew up there.

== Club career ==
=== Early years ===
De Grand began his youth career at OH Leuven, the club local to where he grew up, before joining the academy of Anderlecht. In 2017, at the age of 12, he joined Genk, where he progressed through the youth ranks, represented the club in the UEFA Youth League, and made his professional debut for Jong Genk in the Challenger Pro League in 2022. He described the transition from Genk's reserves to first-team football as having been difficult, with limited opportunities leading him to seek a move.

=== Lommel ===
On 31 January 2023, De Grand joined Lommel in the Challenger Pro League. Having made only six league appearances in the second half of his debut season, he grew into a regular starter during the 2023–24 season, though a knee injury in April 2024 cut short his campaign. He extended his contract until June 2028 in May 2024, despite reported interest from clubs in the Eredivisie, and by the 2025–26 season had become near ever-present at left back, starting almost every match in Lommel's push for promotion.

=== AZ ===
On 26 July 2026, De Grand signed a four-year contract with Eredivisie club AZ.

==== Return to Lommel ====
After only appearing for AZ reserves, on 3 September 2026 De Grand returned to Lommel on loan for the 2026–27 season.

== International career ==
De Grand made his first international appearance for the Netherlands under-18 in 2022, scoring in his only cap at that level.

Having spent virtually his entire life in Belgium, De Grand was approached by the Royal Belgian Football Association about representing Belgium at international level, but declined in favour of the Netherlands. He received his first call-up to the Netherlands under-21 squad in October 2025, one of five players making their debut in the squad that month. He made his under-21 debut on 14 October 2025, starting in a 2–0 home victory over Lithuania in UEFA European Under-21 Championship qualification. Reflecting on the experience afterwards, he said: "It went pretty well, which is nice. There was little tension—I just wanted to show what I could do." He earned his second cap on 30 March 2026, starting in a 2–1 victory over Belgium.

== Style of play ==
De Grand has described himself as a technical left-back who draws on his background as a midfielder, comparing his style to that of Daley Blind.

== Career statistics ==
As of match played 23 May 2026

Appearances and goals by club, season and competition
Club	Season	League			Cup		Other		Total	
Club	Season	Division	Apps	Goals	Apps	Goals	Apps	Goals	Apps	Goals
Jong Genk	2022–23	Challenger Pro League	2	0	—		—		2	0
Lommel	2022–23	Challenger Pro League	6	0	0	0	—		6	0
Lommel	2023–24	Challenger Pro League	25	1	1	0	0	0	26	1
Lommel	2024–25	Challenger Pro League	13	1	0	0	—		13	1
Lommel	2025–26	Challenger Pro League	29	1	1	0	6 (Note: One appearance in Challenger Pro League promotion play-offs)	2	36	3
Lommel	Total		73	3	2	0	6	2	81	5
AZ	2026–27	Eredivisie	0	0	0	0	0	0	0	0
Career total			75	3	2	0	6	2	83	5

== Honours ==
AZ

- Johan Cruyff Shield: 2026
