= Yannis Lawson =

Belgian footballer (born 2004)

Personal information
- Date of birth: 24 November 2004 (age 21)
- Place of birth: Belgium
- Height: 1.79 m (5 ft 10 in)
- Position: Defender

Team information
- Current team: Seraing (on loan from Metz)

Youth career
- –2024: Seraing

Senior career*
Years	Team	Apps	(Gls)
2024–2025	Seraing	30	(1)
2025–	Metz	0	(0)
2025–	Metz B	17	(1)
2026–	→ Seraing (loan)	0	(0)
- * Club domestic league appearances and goals as of 12 April 2025

Yannis Lawson (born 24 November 2004) is a professional footballer who plays as a defender for Challenger Pro League club Seraing on loan from French side Metz. Born in Belgium, he represents Togo internationally.

== Early life ==
Lawson was born on 24 November 2004 in Belgium. Of Togolese descent through his parents, he is a native of Seraing, Belgium.

== Club career ==
As a youth player, Lawson joined the youth academy of Belgian side Seraing and was promoted to the club's senior team in 2024, where he made thirty league appearances and scored one goal.

Following his stint there, he signed for French Ligue 1 side Metz ahead of the 2025–26 season.

On 13 July 2026, Lawson returned on loan to Seraing.

== International career ==
In March 2026, Lawson was called up to the Togo national team for a friendly against Niger, but remained on the bench on that occasion.

== Style of play ==
Lawson plays as a defender and is left-footed. African news website Carréfoot wrote in 2025 that he "stands out for his versatility. Used as a winger, wide midfielder, or full-back at Seraing... his speed, his repeated efforts, and his taste for provocation make him a modern profile, although his preferred position remains left-back".
