= Dylan Demuynck =

Filipino footballer (born 2004)

Personal information
- Full name: Dylan Sylvaan Kelly Elizalde Demuynck
- Date of birth: 6 May 2004 (age 22)
- Place of birth: Waregem, Belgium
- Height: 1.66 m (5 ft 5 in)
- Position: Winger

Team information
- Current team: HSV Hoek
- Number: 22

Youth career
- –2012: Anzegem
- 2012–2021: Zulte Waregem

Senior career*
Years	Team	Apps	(Gls)
2022–2026	Zulte Waregem	24	(2)
2025–2026	→ Lierse (loan)	14	(1)
2026–	HSV Hoek	3	(1)

International career^{‡}
2019	Belgium U15	3	(1)
2023	Belgium U20	1	(0)
2025	Philippines U22	4	(0)
2024–	Philippines	10	(0)
- * Club domestic league appearances and goals as of 3 October 2026 ‡ National team caps and goals as of 13:11, 30 December 2025 (UTC)

Dylan Sylvaan Kelly Elizalde Demuynck (born 6 May 2004) is a professional footballer who plays as a winger for Dutch club HSV Hoek in Tweede Divisie. Born in Belgium, he represents the Philippines national team.

== Career ==
=== Youth ===
Born in Belgium, Demuynck began his career with the youth team of Anzegem and Zulte Waregem.

=== Zulte Waregem ===
In June 2022, after an impressive spell with the youth teams of Zulte Waregem, Demuynck signed his first professional contract until June 2025. A month later, he made his Belgian Pro League debut in a 2–0 win against Seraing, coming in as a substitute replacing Jean-Luc Dompé in the 83rd minute. On 9 September 2023, Demuynck scored his first professional goal in a win against Sint-Lenaarts in the sixth round of the 2023–24 Belgian Cup. He came in as a second-half substitute, replacing Alioune Ndour, scoring a goal eighteen minutes later to make it 4–1. Six days later, Demuynck scored his second professional goal in a 4–2 win against Jong Genk in the Challenger Pro League. He came in as a substitute in the 73rd minute, replacing Robbe Decostere and scored Zulte Waregem's third goal sixteen minutes later. In February 2024, Demuynck signed a contract extension with Zulte Waregem until 2027.

== International career ==
Demuynck was born in Belgium to a Belgian father and a Filipino mother, making him eligible to play for Belgium or the Philippines at international level.

=== Belgium U15 ===
Demuynck scored on his debut for Belgium U15 in a 3–1 away win against England U15.

=== Belgium U20 ===
In November 2023, Demuynck was among the players called up by Thomas Vermaelen for the Belgium U20 national team. He made his debut in a 2–2 draw against France U20, coming in as a substitute for Nolan Martens in the 86th minute.

=== Philippines ===
In March 2024, Demuynck was reportedly one of the players being recruited by head coach Tom Saintfiet and team manager Freddy Gonzalez to play for the Philippines. A month later, Demuynck was visited by the Belgian coach himself on one of his scouting trips in Europe, together with Philippine Ambassador to Belgium Jaime Victor Ledda. He also received his Philippine passport during the visit.

In May 2024, Demuynck was included in the Philippines 28-man squad for the 2026 FIFA World Cup qualifying matches against Vietnam and Indonesia. He made his debut against the former on 6 June 2024 at the Mỹ Đình National Stadium. He started the game and played 88 minutes as Vietnam won 3–2.
