= Anas Namri =

French footballer (born 2001)

Personal information
- Date of birth: 12 November 2001 (age 24)
- Place of birth: Paris, France
- Height: 1.72 m (5 ft 8 in)
- Position: Right-back

Team information
- Current team: Seraing
- Number: 7

Youth career
- 2010–2020: Troyes

Senior career*
Years	Team	Apps	(Gls)
2019–2022	Troyes B	26	(5)
2022–2023	Saint-Étienne B	16	(0)
2022–2023	Saint-Étienne	5	(0)
2023–2026	Virton	48	(2)
2026–	Seraing	5	(0)
- * Club domestic league appearances and goals as of 19 September 2026

Anas Namri (born 12 November 2001) is a French professional footballer who plays as a right-back for Challenger Pro League club Seraing.

== Career ==
In July 2022, after his contract expired with Troyes, Namri went on trial with Saint-Étienne's reserve team. He eventually signed with the club on a one-year contract with an option for a further year, initially playing in the Championnat National 3, as he had done with Troyes previously. On 22 October 2022, Namri made his professional debut for Saint-Étienne in a 1–0 away win over Amiens in Ligue 2. He made four tackles and won eight out of ten ground duels, a performance for which he was voted as the second-best player in the match by Saint-Étienne fans. At the end of the season, Namri left upon his contract's expiration.

On 27 July 2023, Namri signed for the Belgian club Virton.

On 12 August 2026, Namri moved to Seraing in the Belgian second tier on a one-season deal.

== Personal life ==
Born in France, Namri is of Moroccan descent.
