= El Hadji Seck =

Senegalese footballer (born 2007)

Personal information
- Date of birth: 14 January 2007 (age 19)
- Place of birth: Diamniadio, Senegal
- Height: 1.76 m (5 ft 9 in)
- Position: Winger

Team information
- Current team: Gent
- Number: 59

Youth career
- ASFAC Académie

Senior career*
Years	Team	Apps	(Gls)
2023–2025	Diambars		
2025–2026	Jong Gent	22	(6)
2025–	Gent	8	(1)
- * Club domestic league appearances and goals as of 17 November 2026

El Hadji Seck (born 14 January 2007) is a Senegalese professional footballer who plays as a winger for Gent.

== Club career ==
Born in Diamniadio, Seck is a youth product of the ASFAC Académie and Diambars FC, where he played in the Senegalese Ligue 1 and Ligue 2, scoring 6 goals in 9 games in the latter during the 2024–25 season.

In January 2025, he signed for Gent in the Belgian Pro League.

After playing with Gent's under-18 and reserve team in the Division 1 and Challenger Pro League during his first year in Flanders, Seck made his professional debut with cluby in a Belgian Pro League playoff win on penalties over Genk on 31 May 2026.

During the following season he became a regular first team player, scoring his first goal on 6 September 2026, in a 3–0 away league game against Cercle Brugge, and his first brace in a cup game against Union Rochefortoise on the following 18 October.
