= Adjani Mujangi Bia =

Belgian footballer (born 2010)

Personal information
- Date of birth: 30 May 2010 (age 16)
- Position: Midfielder

Team information
- Current team: RSC Anderlecht

Youth career
- –2019: Toekomst Relegem
- 2019–2020: RWDM Brussels
- 2020–: RSC Anderlecht

Senior career*
Years	Team	Apps	(Gls)
2026–	RSCA Futures	6	(0)
2026–	RSC Anderlecht	1	(0)

International career^{‡}
2025	Belgium U15	1	(0)
2025–	Belgium U16	4	(0)
- * Club domestic league appearances and goals ‡ National team caps and goals as of 24 February 2026

Adjani Mujangi Bia (born 30 May 2010) is a Belgian professional footballer who plays as a midfielder for RSC Anderlecht.

== Early life ==
Mujangi Bia was born on 30 May 2010. The son of the DR Congolese-born Belgium international Geoffrey Mujangi Bia, he has a younger brother.

== Club career ==
As a youth player, Mujangi Bia joined the youth academy of Toekomst Relegem. Following his stint there, he joined the youth academy of RWDM Brussels in 2019. Ahead of the 2020–21 season, he joined the youth academy of RSC Anderlecht and was promoted to the club's senior team in 2026.

== International career ==
Mujangi Bia is a Belgium youth international. On 28 October 2025, he debuted for the Belgium national under-16 football team during a 2–4 away loss to the France national under-16 football team.

== Style of play ==
Mujangi Bia plays as a midfielder. Belgian newspaper Het Nieuwsblad wrote in 2026 that he "is a more defensively minded midfielder who can also play in central defense. His passing is always very accurate and he moves well into space. He also knows how to use his body well, making him difficult to dispossess".
