= Mohamed Soumaré =

Belgian footballer (born 1996)

Personal information
- Date of birth: 25 June 1996 (age 30)
- Place of birth: Conakry, Guinea
- Height: 1.75 m (5 ft 9 in)
- Position: Striker

Team information
- Current team: Al Hamriyah
- Number: 9

Youth career
- Anderlecht

Senior career*
Years	Team	Apps	(Gls)
2014–2018	Avellino	37	(0)
2016	→ Melfi (loan)	14	(2)
2017	→ Teramo (loan)	12	(0)
2018	→ Dudelange (loan)	9	(1)
2018–2020	Virton	34	(2)
2021–2024	RAAL La Louvière	85	(42)
2024–2026	Lokeren	43	(7)
2026–	Al Hamriyah	5	(0)
- * Club domestic league appearances and goals as of 18 September 2026

Mohamed Soumaré (born 25 June 1996) is a Belgian professional footballer who plays as a striker for UAE First Division League club Al Hamriyah.

== Club career ==
He scored his first goal after joining Melfi on loan in 2016 during his debut match against Catanzaro.

In March 2021, Soumaré joined RAAL La Louvière after being a free agent for almost a year.

== Personal life ==
Soumaré resumed his studies in engineering management at the Université libre de Bruxelles. He is married and has a daughter.
