= Dani van den Heuvel =

Dutch footballer (born 2003)

Personal information
- Full name: Tristan Danique van den Heuvel
- Date of birth: 28 May 2003 (age 23)
- Place of birth: Delft, Netherlands
- Height: 1.89 m (6 ft 2 in)
- Position: Goalkeeper

Team information
- Current team: OH Leuven
- Number: 1

Youth career
- 2008-2014: Wippolder
- 2014–2017: ADO Den Haag
- 2017–2020: Ajax
- 2020–2024: Leeds United

Senior career*
Years	Team	Apps	(Gls)
2023–2024	Leeds United	0	(0)
2024–2026	Club Brugge	10	(0)
2024–2025	Club NXT	7	(0)
2026–	OH Leuven	8	(0)

International career
2017–2018	Netherlands U15	4	(0)
2018–2019	Netherlands U16	3	(0)
2019	Netherlands U17	4	(0)
2021	Netherlands U19	4	(0)
2024–2025	Netherlands U21	2	(0)
- * Club domestic league appearances and goals as of 11:18, 29 October 2026 (UTC)

Tristan Danique "Dani" van den Heuvel (born 28 May 2003) is a Dutch professional footballer who plays as a goalkeeper for Belgian Pro League club OH Leuven.

== Club career ==
Raised in Delfgauw, Van den Heuvel started playing football at local club SV Wippolder.

=== Leeds United ===
In 2020, van den Heuvel joined the youth academy of English Premier League side Leeds United.

He was first included in Leeds's matchday senior squad as a backup goalkeeper in January 2023 in a FA Cup game against Accrington Stanley.

He was released by Leeds in June 2024 at the conclusion of his contract.

=== Club Brugge ===
On 7 August 2024, van den Heuvel signed a two-year contract with Club Brugge in Belgium.

=== OH Leuven ===
In June 2026, Van den Heuvel joined Belgian Pro League club OH Leuven on as a free agent, signing a three-year deal.

== International career ==
Van den Heuvel made his debut for the Netherlands national under-21 football team in March 2024.

== Personal life ==
He is eligible to represent Indonesia internationally.

== Career statistics ==
As of match played 24 October 2026

Appearances and goals by club, season and competition
Club	Season	League			Cup		League Cup		Europe		Other		Total	
Club	Season	Division	Apps	Goals	Apps	Goals	Apps	Goals	Apps	Goals	Apps	Goals	Apps	Goals
Leeds United	2022–23	Premier League	0	0	—		—		—		0	0	0	0
Leeds United	2023–24	EFL Championship	0	0	—		—		—		0	0	0	0
Club Brugge	2024–25	Belgian Pro League	0	0	—		—		—		0	0	0	0
Club Brugge	2025–26	Belgian Pro League	10	0	2	0	—		1 (Note: Appearance in UEFA Champions League)	0	—		13	0
Club Brugge	Total		10	0	2	0	—		1	0	0	0	13	0
Club NXT	2024–25	Challenger Pro League	7	0	—		—		—		0	0	7	0
OH Leuven	2026–27	Belgian Pro League	8	0	0	0	—		—		—		8	0
Career total			25	0	2	0	0	0	1	0	0	0	28	0
