= Raymond Asante =

Ghanaian footballer (born 2004)

Personal information
- Full name: Raymond Anokye Asante
- Date of birth: 27 May 2004 (age 22)
- Place of birth: Bogoso, Ghana
- Height: 1.72 m (5 ft 8 in)
- Position: Forward

Team information
- Current team: Francs Borains (on loan from Charleroi)
- Number: 12

Youth career
- Scores Academy
- 2020–2022: Young Apostles FC
- 2022–2024: Udinese

Senior career*
Years	Team	Apps	(Gls)
2024–2025	Udinese	0	(0)
2024–2025	→ Zebra Elites (loan)	7	(2)
2024–2025	→ Charleroi (loan)	2	(1)
2025–	Zebra Elites	13	(8)
2025–	Charleroi	8	(0)
2026	→ Patro Eisden (loan)	9	(1)
2026–	→ Francs Borains (loan)	5	(1)
- * Club domestic league appearances and goals as of 18 September 2026

Raymond Anokye Asante (born 27 May 2004) is a Ghanaian professional football player who plays as a forward for Challenger Pro League club Francs Borains in Belgium on loan from Charleroi.

== Club career ==
Asante is a product of the Ghanaian youth academies Scores Academy and Young Apostles FC. On 27 August 2022, Asante transferred to the Italian side Udinese on a contract until 2027, where he was assigned to their youth sides. On 5 August 2023, he was named to the first team squad at Udinese for the 2023–24 season after his stint with their Primavera side. On 2 April 2024, he debuted with the senior Udinese team in a friendly match against Padova.

On 2 August 2024, Asante moved to the Belgian reserve side Zebra Elites on a year-long loan. He made his senior and professional debut with the senior Charleroi in a 4–1 Belgian Pro League win over Sint-Truiden on 3 August 2024. On 20 January 2025, he formally signed with Royal Charleroi on a 1-year contract with the option to extend for 2 more seasons.
