= Mo Salah (footballer, born 2004) =

Belgian footballer (born 2004

Mohamed Salah
Personal information
- Full name: Mohamed Salah El Boukammiri
- Date of birth: 27 May 2004 (age 22)
- Place of birth: Spain
- Height: 1.80 m (5 ft 11 in)
- Position: Winger

Team information
- Current team: Casa Pia
- Number: 11

Youth career
- Crossing Schaarbeek
- Zulte-Waregem
- –2022: Union SG

Senior career*
Years	Team	Apps	(Gls)
2022–2023	Union SG U23	27	(3)
2022–2023	Union SG	2	(0)
2023–2024	Club NXT	22	(4)
2024–2026	Lommel	60	(12)
2026–	Casa Pia	1	(0)

International career^{‡}
2023	Belgium U20	2	(0)
- * Club domestic league appearances and goals as of 6 September 2026 ‡ National team caps and goals as of 21 November 2023

Mohamed "Mo" Salah El Boukammiri (born 27 May 2004) is a Belgian professional footballer who plays as a winger for Primeira Liga club Casa Pia.

== Club career ==
Salah first played his youth football in Schaerbeek and Waregem, before joining Royale Union Saint-Gilloise, where he grew through the youth ranks, becoming part of the first team during the 2022–23 pre-season.

He made his professional debut for Union SG on 23 July 2022, coming on as a late substitute during the Division 1A 1–1 draw against Sint-Truiden.

On 6 June 2023, Salah signed a two-year contract with Club NXT, the Challenger Pro League reserve team of Club Brugge. This was followed by transfers to Lommel in 2024 and Casa Pia in 2026.
