= Devon De Corte =

American soccer player (born 2006)

Personal information
- Full name: Devon Findell De Corte
- Date of birth: May 13, 2006 (age 20)
- Place of birth: Bucks County, Pennsylvania, United States
- Height: 1.74 m (5 ft 9 in)
- Position: Midfielder

Team information
- Current team: Den Bosch
- Number: 10

Youth career
- –2023: Philadelphia Union
- 2023–2024: Anderlecht

Senior career*
Years	Team	Apps	(Gls)
2024–2026	RSCA Futures	58	(7)
2026–	Den Bosch	9	(2)

International career^{‡}
2024	Belgium U18	1	(0)
2024	Belgium U19	4	(0)
2025–	United States U20	3	(0)
- * Club domestic league appearances and goals as of October 3, 2026 ‡ National team caps and goals as of June 8, 2026

Devon Findell De Corte (born May 13, 2006) is an American soccer player who plays as a midfielder for Eerste Divisie club Den Bosch in the Netherlands. He has represented both the United States and Belgium at youth level.

== Early life ==
De Corte was born in Bucks County, Pennsylvania, on May 13, 2006. He moved to the Philadelphia area at the age of 14. His father is Belgian and his mother is American; who met while attending university in the country. Growing up, he played multiple sports and practiced piano.

== Career ==
As a youth player, De Corte joined the youth academy of American side Philadelphia Union, before joining the youth academy of Belgian side Anderlecht. In 2024, he started his senior career with the club's reserve team. On February 2, 2024, he debuted for them during a 1–1 home draw with RFC Liège in the league.

On July 3, 2026, De Corte signed a three-year contract with Den Bosch in the Dutch second-tier Eerste Divisie.
