= Emmanuel Matuta =

Belgian footballer

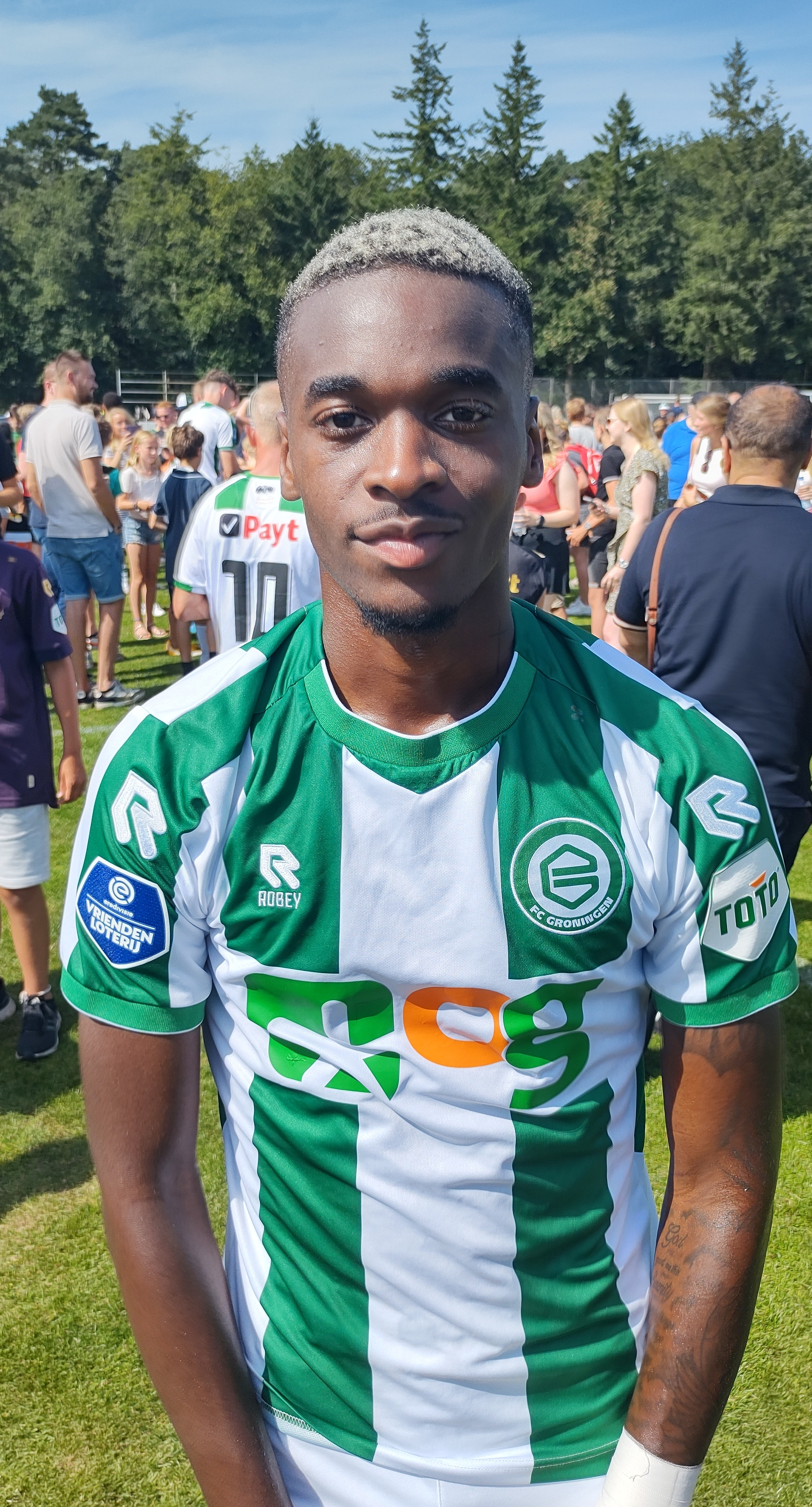

Personal information
- Full name: Emmanuel Matuta La Nkenda Nosa
- Date of birth: 22 February 2002 (age 24)
- Place of birth: Mechelen, Belgium
- Height: 1.77 m (5 ft 10 in)
- Position: Defensive midfielder

Youth career
- –2014: K.V. Mechelen
- 2014–2022: PSV Eindhoven

Senior career*
Years	Team	Apps	(Gls)
2020–2022	Jong PSV	48	(1)
2022–2023	Groningen	8	(0)
2024–2026	Lierse	43	(4)

International career^{‡}
2017	Belgium U15	3	(0)
2017	Belgium U16	1	(0)
2019	Belgium U18	2	(0)
- * Club domestic league appearances and goals as of 20 April 2026 ‡ National team caps and goals as of 15 September 2020

Emmanuel Matuta La Nkenda Nosa (born 22 February 2002) is a Belgian footballer who plays as a defensive midfielder.

== Club career ==
On 20 January 2022, Matuta signed a contract with Dutch club Groningen until the summer of 2026.

== International career ==
Born in Belgium, Matuta is of Congolese descent. He is a youth international for Belgium.

== Career statistics ==
=== Club ===
As of 17 January 2022

Appearances and goals by club, season and competition
Club	Season	League			Cup		Continental		Other		Total	
Club	Season	Division	Apps	Goals	Apps	Goals	Apps	Goals	Apps	Goals	Apps	Goals
Jong PSV	2020–21	Eerste Divisie	48	1	–		–		0	0	48	1
Career total			48	1	0	0	0	0	0	0	48	1
