= Pjotr Kestens =

Belgian footballer (born 2001)

Personal information
- Date of birth: 26 October 2001 (age 25)
- Place of birth: Ghent, Belgium
- Height: 1.72 m (5 ft 8 in)
- Position: Winger

Team information
- Current team: Dender
- Number: 17

Youth career
- 2007–2013: KV Mechelen
- 2013–2019: Zulte Waregem
- 2019–2020: NAC Breda

Senior career*
Years	Team	Apps	(Gls)
2020–2022	NAC Breda	30	(3)
2022–2024	Eindhoven	28	(2)
2024–2026	RWDM Brussels	50	(8)
2026–	Dender	3	(0)

International career
2018	Belgium U17	2	(0)
- * Club domestic league appearances and goals as of 12:06, 3 October 2026 (UTC)

Pjotr Kestens (born 26 October 2001) is a Belgian professional footballer who plays as a winger for Challenger Pro League club Dender.

== Early life and youth career ==
Kestens was born in Ghent, Belgium, and raised in Mechelen. He began playing youth football with local side KV Mechelen before moving to the academy of Zulte Waregem. In 2019, at the age of 17, he joined the youth system of NAC Breda in the Netherlands.

His development at NAC progressed rapidly. After scoring seven goals in 13 matches for the under-19 team, he was invited to train with the senior squad in early 2020. Around the same time, he had represented Belgium at under-17 level, earning two caps prior to his move abroad.

In June 2020, Kestens signed his first professional contract with NAC—a two-year deal with an option for a third season. NAC's technical director at the time, Tom Van den Abbeele, described him as "a quick, technically skilled flank player who is comfortable on both wings and enjoys taking on defenders one-on-one." Kestens expressed appreciation for the opportunity to begin his professional career at what he called "a tradition club," and joined the first-team squad ahead of the 2020–21 Eerste Divisie season.

== Club career ==
=== NAC Breda ===
Kestens made his professional debut for NAC Breda in the Dutch Eerste Divisie during the 2020–21 season. Utilised primarily as a substitute in his first senior year, he made six appearances in all competitions.

In the following season, Kestens became a more regular presence in the matchday squad. He featured in 25 league matches—10 of them as a starter—and scored three goals. Over two seasons with the first team, he made a total of 32 appearances and recorded three goals and two assists. He was predominantly used as an impact player, contributing during NAC's campaigns in the second tier, where the club narrowly missed out on promotion.

In June 2022, Kestens joined Eindhoven on a free transfer. Although NAC had previously exercised an option to extend his contract, the club permitted his departure without a fee, securing a sell-on clause as part of the arrangement. The move reunited him with Rob Penders, his former coach at NAC, who was by then manager of Eindhoven.

=== Eindhoven ===
Kestens joined FC Eindhoven ahead of the 2022–23 Eerste Divisie season. He made an immediate impact, scoring a 95th-minute winner on his home debut on 12 August 2022 to secure a 2–1 victory over Willem II. Coming off the bench late in the match, his goal delivered Eindhoven their first win of the campaign and quickly endeared him to the club's supporters. Throughout the 2022–23 campaign, Kestens was a regular member of the squad. He made 21 league appearances, contributing two goals and two assists, as Eindhoven secured a place in the promotion playoffs. He featured in one play-off match, with the club ultimately failing to gain promotion.

In the following season, Kestens' role was more limited. He made seven league appearances without scoring, as injuries and increased competition for places restricted his involvement. At the end of the season, his contract expired and he left the club as a free agent.

=== RWDM Brussels ===
In June 2024, Kestens returned to Belgian football by signing a two-year contract with an option for a third year with RWDM. The Brussels-based club had recently been relegated from the Belgian Pro League and was restructuring its squad in preparation for a promotion campaign. The announcement noted that Kestens, then 22 years old, had joined on a free transfer following the expiry of his contract with Eindhoven. The move marked his first time playing professionally in Belgium, having previously spent his entire senior career in the Netherlands.

Kestens established himself as a regular starter during the 2024–25 Challenger Pro League season, primarily playing as a left winger. He made 22 league appearances and scored four goals, contributing to RWDM's qualification for the promotion play-offs. In addition to his league performances, he featured in the Belgian Cup, helping the club reach the seventh round.

=== Dender ===
On 29 July 2026, Kestens signed with recently relegated Challenger Pro League club FCV Dender EH after a successful trial.

== International career ==
Kestens has represented Belgium at youth level. In 2018, he earned two caps for the Belgium under-17 national team.
