= RFC Seraing (1922) =

Belgian association football club, based in Seraing

- Full name: Royale Football Club Seraing
- Nickname: The White Lions
- Founded: 1922; 104 years ago
- Ground: Stade du Pairay, Seraing
- Capacity: 8,207
- Owner: Bernard Serin
- Chairman: Marc Sombreffe
- Manager: Arnauld Mercier
- League: Challenger Pro League
- 2025–26: Challenger Pro League, 11th of 17
- Website: www.rfc-seraing.be
Home colours	Away colours	Third colours

RFC Seraing is a Belgian association football club based in Seraing in the province of Liège. They play their home games at the Stade du Pairay. The club currently compete in Challenger Pro League, the second tier of Belgian football.

== History ==
The club was founded in the early 20th century as RFC Bressoux, registered with the Belgian FA under matricule 23, but renamed in 1992 to Royale Union Liégeoise or RUL after a merger. Upon the default of R.F.C. Seraing in 1996, the club was renamed to Seraing RUL and started playing at the Stade du Pairay where the former RFC Seraing played until its default. It was however an entirely different club and completely distinct from the former RFC Seraing. Seraing RUL was at that time playing at the fourth level of Belgian football. The club would remain at the lower levels of Belgian football, never higher than the third level. In 2006, the club changed its name to RFC Seresien in reference to the club whose place it took, and two years later was again renamed to RFC Seraing after a merger.

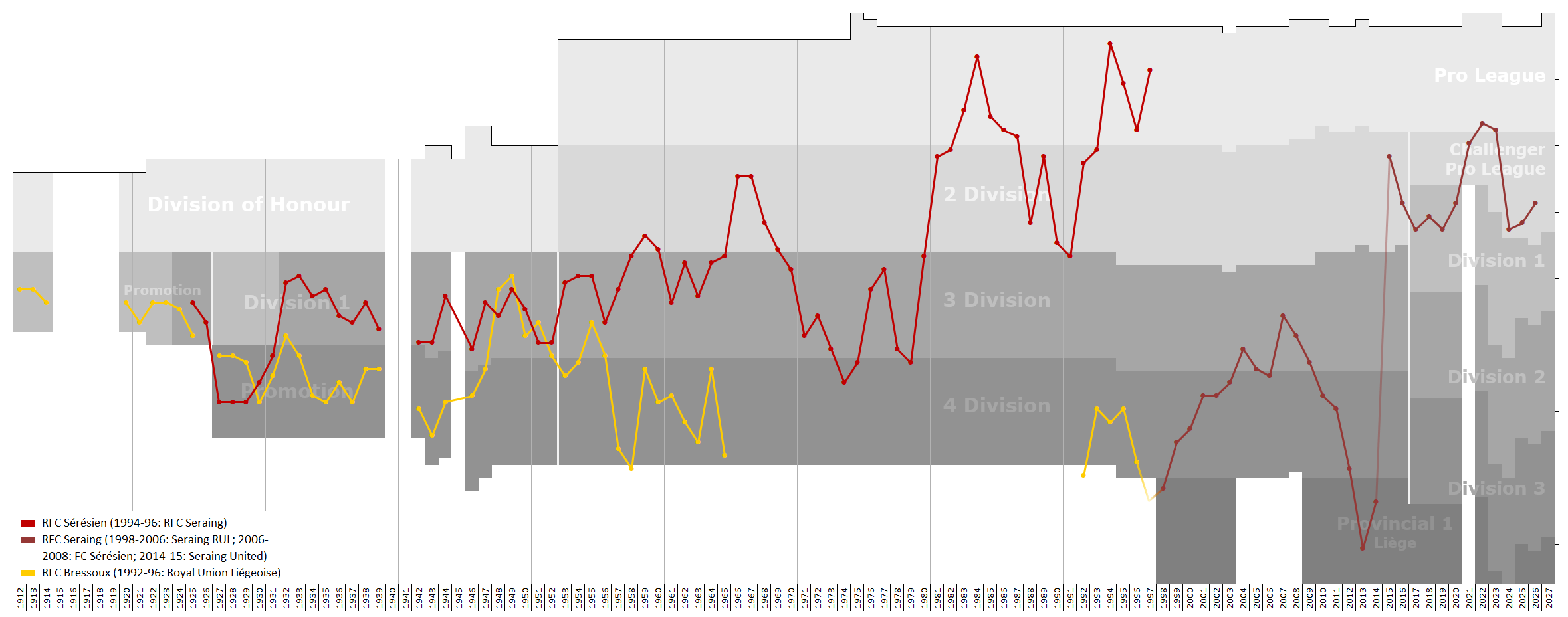
Historical chart of RFC Seraing league performance

In 2014, RFC Seraing, playing in the fifth tier, was acquired by the owner of FC Metz and entered an agreement to swap matricules with the second-tier club Boussu Dour Borinage in order for Seraing to move up to a higher level. As a result, the club started the 2014–15 season in the Belgian Second Division with matricule 167 and under the new name Seraing United, but reverted to RFC Seraing one season later. With the Belgian league reform of 2016, the club dropped back to the third level, but managed to achieve promotion twice in succession in 2019–20 and 2020–21 to reach the 2021–22 Belgian First Division A, bringing back top division football to the city of Seraing after 25 years.

In 2022–23 season, Seraing got relegated back to Challenger Pro League. In the following season, the club avoided relegation to Belgian National Division 1 for the 2024–25 season after finishing 15th place in 2023–24 Challenger Pro League due to the administrative relegation of KV Oostende. They also avoided relegation next season ahead of Jong Genk after a rule that would’ve prevented their relegation was passed after Jong Genk’s relegation, and after the bankruptcy of KMSK Deinze.

== Honours ==
- Belgian Second Division
  - Champions (2): 1981–82, 1992–93

== Players ==
=== Current squad ===
As of 3 September 2026

Note: Flags indicate national team as defined under FIFA eligibility rules; some limited exceptions apply. Players may hold more than one non-FIFA nationality.

No.	Pos.	Nation	Player
1	GK	BEL	Nick Gillekens
3	DF	FRA	Oussmane Kébé
4	DF	LUX	Relja Biševac
5	DF	FRA	Victor Corneillie
6	DF	COD	Emmanuel Da Costa
7	DF	MAR	Anas Namri
8	MF	FRA	Wassim Bahri
9	FW	FRA	Mahi Gnemagnon (on loan from Metz)
10	FW	SEN	Saliou Faye
11	FW	BEL	Matthieu Muland
14	DF	BEL	Fostave Mabani
15	DF	SEN	Moustapha Diop (on loan from Metz)
16	GK	FRA	Romain Jean-Baptiste
17	FW	BEL	Matteo Bisarre
18	DF	LUX	Antoine Lommel

No.	Pos.	Nation	Player
19	MF	ALG	Nabil Bouchentouf
20	FW	FRA	Alexandre Tunkadi
21	MF	BEL	Valerio Di Crescenzo
22	MF	BEL	Matteo Scarpinati
23	DF	TOG	Yannis Lawson (on loan from Metz)
24	MF	BEL	Tom Lockman
25	MF	BEL	Reda Aamer
27	FW	ALG	Amine Messoussa
29	FW	BEL	Nils Velleuer
30	GK	CMR	Boris Ngoua
31	MF	BEL	Loam Grégoire
34	MF	BEL	Lucas Brulmans
35	GK	BEL	Yani Rutkowski
36	MF	SRB	Alek Biševac
