= List of Belgian football transfers winter 2025–26 =

This is a list of Belgian football transfers in the winter transfer window 2025–26 by club. Only transfers of the Belgian Pro League and Challenger Pro League are included.

== Sorted by team ==
=== Belgian Pro League teams ===
==== Anderlecht ====
In:

No.	Pos.	Nation	Player
—	DF	FRA	Mathys Angely (on loan from VfL Wolfsburg)
—	DF	ESP	Coba da Costa (on loan from Getafe)
—	DF	MLI	Moussa Diarra (on loan from Alavés)
—	GK	GER	Justin Heekeren (from Schalke 04)
—	FW	UKR	Danylo Sikan (from Trabzonspor)

Out:

No.	Pos.	Nation	Player
5	DF	SEN	Moussa N'Diaye (on loan to Schalke 04)
8	MF	NED	Cedric Hatenboer (on loan to Telstar)
16	GK	DEN	Mads Kikkenborg (to Molde)
18	MF	GHA	Majeed Ashimeru (on loan to La Louvière)
19	MF	ECU	Nilson Angulo (to Sunderland)
20	FW	ARG	Luis Vázquez (on loan to Getafe)
58	DF	TUR	Yasin Özcan (loan return to Aston Villa)

==== Antwerp ====
In:

No.	Pos.	Nation	Player
—	DF	BEL	Rein Van Helden (from Sint-Truiden)

Out:

No.	Pos.	Nation	Player
26	DF	BUL	Rosen Bozhinov (to Pisa)

==== Cercle Brugge ====
In:

No.	Pos.	Nation	Player
—	DF	COL	Royer Caicedo (from Atlético Nacional)
—	MF	GER	Charles Herrmann (from Borussia Mönchengladbach)
—	DF	FRA	Geoffrey Kondo (from Dunkerque)
—	FW	BEL	Dante Vanzeir (on loan from Gent)

Out:

No.	Pos.	Nation	Player
3	DF	LTU	Edgaras Utkus (to Al-Kholood)
4	DF	FRA	Dalangunypole Gomis (on loan to Sochaux)
11	FW	ECU	Alan Minda (to Atlético Mineiro)
14	DF	BEL	Beni Mpanzu (on loan to Hasselt)
22	FW	BEL	Alama Bayo (on loan to Lokeren)

==== Charleroi ====
In:

No.	Pos.	Nation	Player

Out:

No.	Pos.	Nation	Player
28	FW	GHA	Raymond Asante (on loan to Patro Eisden Maasmechelen)
71	FW	GEO	Nikoloz Chikovani (loan return to Watford)
—	FW	HAI	Mondy Prunier (was on loan to Eupen, now loaned to Francs Borains)
—	FW	SRB	Slobodan Stanojlovic (signed from OFK Beograd, then loaned to Francs Borains)

==== Club Brugge ====
In:

No.	Pos.	Nation	Player
—	MF	FRA	Félix Lemaréchal (from Strasbourg)

Out:

No.	Pos.	Nation	Player
2	DF	ARG	Zaid Romero (on loan to Getafe)
87	FW	BEL	Kaye Furo (to Brentford)

==== Dender EH ====
In:

No.	Pos.	Nation	Player
—	MF	BEL	Amine Daali (promoted from Dender EH U21)
—	DF	BEL	Bo De Kerf (from Lierse)
—	GK	FRA	Gauthier Gallon (from Rennes)

Out:

No.	Pos.	Nation	Player
10	FW	CIV	Moïse Sahi Dion (to Annecy)

==== Genk ====
In:

No.	Pos.	Nation	Player
—	MF	BEL	August De Wannemacker (promoted from Jong Genk)
—	GK	MLI	Emile Doucouré (from Beerschot)

Out:

No.	Pos.	Nation	Player
9	FW	KOR	Oh Hyeon-gyu (to Beşiktaş)
17	MF	SVK	Patrik Hrošovský (to Viktoria Plzeň)
24	MF	BEL	Luca Oyen (to Heerenveen)

==== Gent ====
In:

No.	Pos.	Nation	Player
—	FW	SEN	Moctar Diop (from Lillestrøm)
—	DF	JPN	Daiki Hashioka (on loan from Slavia Prague)
—	FW	KOR	Hong Hyun-seok (on loan from 1. FSV Mainz 05)

Out:

No.	Pos.	Nation	Player
2	DF	CMR	Samuel Kotto (on loan to Reims)
9	FW	ISR	Omri Gandelman (to Lecce)
13	DF	SRB	Stefan Mitrović (released to Partizan)
14	FW	BEL	Dante Vanzeir (on loan to Cercle Brugge)
19	MF	SUI	Franck Surdez (to Sion)
26	DF	BEL	Bram Lagae (to Dunkerque)

==== La Louvière ====
In:

No.	Pos.	Nation	Player
—	MF	GHA	Majeed Ashimeru (on loan from Anderlecht)
—	FW	EQG	Cristian Makaté (on loan from Union SG)
—	FW	BEL	Nachon Nsingi (from OH Leuven)
—	MF	FRA	Bryan Soumaré (free agent)

Out:

No.	Pos.	Nation	Player
9	FW	MLI	Mohamed Guindo (on loan to Clermont Foot)
10	MF	FRA	Maxime Pau (to Lokeren)
17	MF	FRA	Lucas Bretelle (to Le Mans)
29	FW	FRA	Oucasse Mendy (to Universitatea Cluj)
51	MF	BEL	Sekou Sidibe (to Partizani)

==== OH Leuven ====
In:

No.	Pos.	Nation	Player
—	FW	BEL	Kyan Vaesen (from Westerlo)

Out:

No.	Pos.	Nation	Player
11	FW	FIN	Casper Terho (on loan to Sparta Rotterdam)
20	FW	BEL	Nachon Nsingi (released to La Louvière)
22	FW	SRB	Jovan Mijatović (loan return to New York City)

==== Mechelen ====
In:

No.	Pos.	Nation	Player
—	FW	NED	Bouke Boersma (from De Graafschap)

Out:

No.	Pos.	Nation	Player
5	MF	AUS	Ryan Teague (on loan to Melbourne City)
20	FW	GER	Lion Lauberbach (to Venezia)
—	DF	MAR	Amine Et-Taïbi (was on loan to Helmond Sport, then sold to Willem II)

==== Sint-Truiden ====
In:

No.	Pos.	Nation	Player
—	FW	SEN	Oumar Diouf (from RFC Liège)
—	FW	FRA	Loïc Mbe Soh (from Beerschot)
—	FW	BEL	Joedrick Pupe (on loan from Vancouver Whitecaps)
—	FW	JPN	Shion Shinkawa (from Sagan Tosu)

Out:

No.	Pos.	Nation	Player
9	FW	URU	Andrés Ferrari (on loan to Sporting Gijón)
20	DF	BEL	Rein Van Helden (to Antwerp)
32	FW	BEL	Jay-David Mbalanda (on loan to Olympic Charleroi)

==== Standard Liège ====
In:

No.	Pos.	Nation	Player
—	MF	DEN	Gustav Mortensen (from Lyngby)
—	FW	CMR	Bernard Nguene (from Nice)
—	MF	MLT	Teddy Teuma (from Reims)

Out:

No.	Pos.	Nation	Player
6	MF	RWA	Hakim Sahabo (to AEK Athens)

==== Union SG ====
In:

No.	Pos.	Nation	Player
—	FW	GER	Mateo Biondic (from Eintracht Trier)
—	DF	SEN	Massiré Sylla (from Lyn)
—	MF	SWE	Besfort Zeneli (from Elfsborg)

Out:

No.	Pos.	Nation	Player
4	MF	NOR	Mathias Rasmussen (to FC St. Pauli)
23	MF	MAR	Sofiane Boufal (released to Le Havre)
31	FW	EQG	Cristian Makaté (on loan to La Louvière)

==== Westerlo ====
In:

No.	Pos.	Nation	Player
—	MF	BEL	Naoufal Bohamdi-Kamoni (from RSCA Futures)
—	FW	TUR	Enis Destan (on loan from Hull City)
—	DF	BEL	Michée Ndembi (from Benfica B)
—	DF	FRA	Clinton Nsiala (on loan from Rangers)
—	DF	FRA	Dylan Ourega (from Guingamp)
—	FW	POR	Afonso Patrão (from Braga)
—	MF	JPN	Shunsuke Saito (from Mito HollyHock)

Out:

No.	Pos.	Nation	Player
10	MF	ESP	Antonio Cordero (loan return to Newcastle United)
11	MF	SCO	Adedire Mebude (to Çaykur Rizespor)
14	FW	BEL	Kyan Vaesen (to OH Leuven)
18	MF	USA	Griffin Yow (to New England Revolution)
19	MF	BEL	Mathias Fixelles (released to Francs Borains)
21	MF	SVK	Ján Bernát (released)
25	DF	BEL	Tuur Rommens (to Rangers)

==== Zulte Waregem ====
In:

No.	Pos.	Nation	Player
—	MF	BEL	Dirk Asare (from Lierse)
—	FW	SEN	Malick Mbaye (from Metz)
—	MF	DEN	Tristan Panduro (from Copenhagen)
—	DF	SEN	Mouhamadou Sall (from Espoirs de Guédiawaye)
—	DF	TUR	Kadir Seven (from Çorum)

Out:

No.	Pos.	Nation	Player
14	DF	ISL	Atli Barkarson (to Sogndal)
21	MF	NGA	Tochukwu Nnadi (to Marseille)
23	GK	NED	Ennio van der Gouw (on loan to Rio Ave)
—	FW	SEN	Alioune Ndour (was on loan to Kristiansund, now sold to Ararat-Armenia)

=== Challenger Pro League teams ===
==== Beerschot ====
In:

No.	Pos.	Nation	Player
—	FW	RSA	Siviwe Magidigidi (from Siwelele)
—	FW	JPN	Ken Masui (on loan from Nagoya Grampus)
—	GK	JPN	William Popp (on loan from Shonan Bellmare)
—	DF	POR	Nilton Varela (free agent)

Out:

No.	Pos.	Nation	Player
5	DF	FRA	Loïc Mbe Soh (to Sint-Truiden)
9	FW	LBR	Ayouba Kosiah (to Radnik Surdulica)
13	GK	MLI	Emile Doucouré (to Genk)
42	MF	URU	Thiago Lugano (on loan to Pontedera)

==== Beveren ====
In:

No.	Pos.	Nation	Player
—	MF	BEL	Chris Lokesa (from RKC Waalwijk)
—	FW	NED	Jesse van de Haar (on loan from Utrecht)

Out:

No.	Pos.	Nation	Player
11	FW	JPN	Yutaka Michiwaki (loan return to Roasso Kumamoto)

==== Club NXT ====
In:

No.	Pos.	Nation	Player
—	DF	ENG	Andre Garcia (from Reading)

Out:

No.	Pos.	Nation	Player
75	DF	BEL	Jano Willems (to Lierse)
93	DF	BEL	Renzo Tytens (to Lyngby)

==== Eupen ====
In:

No.	Pos.	Nation	Player
—	FW	POR	Kikas (from Estrela da Amadora)
—	MF	QAT	Mostafa Meshaal (on loan from Al Sadd)
—	DF	FRA	Yoram Zague (on loan from Paris Saint-Germain)

Out:

No.	Pos.	Nation	Player
11	FW	NGA	Ade Oguns (on loan to Ferizaj)
17	FW	POL	David Widlarz (released)
23	FW	HAI	Mondy Prunier (loan return to Charleroi)

==== Francs Borains ====
In:

No.	Pos.	Nation	Player
—	MF	BEL	Mathias Fixelles (from Westerlo)
—	DF	COM	Yannis Kari (from Fréjus Saint-Raphaël)
—	FW	HAI	Mondy Prunier (on loan from Charleroi)
—	FW	SRB	Slobodan Stanojlovic (on loan from Charleroi)

Out:

No.	Pos.	Nation	Player
11	MF	MAR	Kays Ruiz-Atil (to RFC Liège)

==== Jong Genk ====
In:

No.	Pos.	Nation	Player
—	FW	COD	Elie Mpungu Kongolo (on loan from TP les Anges)

Out:

No.	Pos.	Nation	Player
54	DF	NED	Juwensley Onstein (to Barcelona Atlètic)
56	MF	BEL	August De Wannemacker (promoted to Genk)
62	DF	BEL	Michiel Cauwel (to Jong KAA Gent)
80	FW	BEL	Saïdou Touré (to Jong KAA Gent)

==== Jong KAA Gent ====
In:

No.	Pos.	Nation	Player
—	DF	BEL	Michiel Cauwel (from Jong Genk)
—	DF	CIV	Eric Simpore (on loan from SOA)
—	FW	BEL	Saïdou Touré (from Jong Genk)
—	DF	JPN	Sota Tsukuda (on loan from Yokohama)

Out:

No.	Pos.	Nation	Player
38	DF	GUI	Mohamed Soumah (to Sirius)

==== Kortrijk ====
In:

No.	Pos.	Nation	Player
—	FW	MAD	Bryan Adinany (from Lierse)

Out:

No.	Pos.	Nation	Player
29	MF	FRA	Mohamed Boussadia (on loan to Knokke)

==== Lierse ====
In:

No.	Pos.	Nation	Player
—	FW	SVN	Lun Boncina (from Vukovar 1991)
—	DF	BEL	Pieter De Schrijver (from Patro Eisden Maasmechelen)
—	FW	BEL	Alexandre Stanić (from Zébra Élites)
—	DF	BEL	Jano Willems (from Club NXT)
—	MF	GHA	Elton Yeboah (from Jong KVM)

Out:

No.	Pos.	Nation	Player
9	FW	MAD	Bryan Adinany (to Kortrijk)
21	DF	BEL	Bo De Kerf (to Dender EH)
36	MF	BEL	Dirk Asare (to Zulte Waregem)
48	MF	BEL	Yann Gboua (loan return to SL16 FC)

==== Lokeren ====
In:

No.	Pos.	Nation	Player
—	FW	BEL	Alama Bayo (on loan from Cercle Brugge)
—	FW	BDI	Vancy Mabanza (from Patro Eisden Maasmechelen)
—	MF	FRA	Maxime Pau (from La Louvière)

Out:

No.	Pos.	Nation	Player
18	FW	GHA	Sumaila Wasiu (to Železničar Pančevo)
44	MF	BEL	Radja Nainggolan (to Patro Eisden Maasmechelen)

==== Lommel ====
In:

No.	Pos.	Nation	Player
—	FW	NED	Robin van Duiven (on loan from PSV)

Out:

No.	Pos.	Nation	Player
17	FW	COL	John Montaño (on loan to Independiente Medellín)
—	MF	BUL	Filip Krastev (was on loan to Oxford United, now loaned to Göztepe)

==== Olympic Charleroi ====
In:

No.	Pos.	Nation	Player
—	DF	CTA	Mike Bettinger (free agent)
—	DF	BEL	Nathan de Medina (free agent)
—	GK	EQG	Aitor Embela (from Soneja)
—	MF	MTQ	Thomas Ephestion (from Saint-Priest)
—	MF	IRQ	Abdullah Hameed (free agent)
—	FW	BEL	Jay-David Mbalanda (on loan from Sint-Truiden)
—	FW	LUX	Michael Omosanya (on loan from Jeunesse Esch)

Out:

No.	Pos.	Nation	Player
23	GK	ESP	Iago Herrerín (from Deportivo Pasto)
55	DF	FRA	Victor Corneillie (to RFC Liège)

==== Patro Eisden Maasmechelen ====
In:

No.	Pos.	Nation	Player
—	FW	GHA	Raymond Asante (on loan from Charleroi)
—	DF	BEL	Justin Munezero (from Hasselt)
—	MF	BEL	Radja Nainggolan (from Lokeren)

Out:

No.	Pos.	Nation	Player
2	DF	BEL	Pieter De Schrijver (to Lierse)
81	FW	BDI	Vancy Mabanza (to Lokeren)

==== RFC Liège ====
In:

No.	Pos.	Nation	Player
—	DF	FRA	Victor Corneillie (from Olympic Charleroi)
—	FW	SEN	Khadim Dieng (from Panazol)
—	FW	TUR	Emrehan Gedikli (free agent)
—	MF	MAR	Kays Ruiz-Atil (from Francs Borains)

Out:

No.	Pos.	Nation	Player
9	FW	SEN	Oumar Diouf (to Sint-Truiden)
17	MF	FRA	Flavio Da Silva (to Concarneau)
26	MF	ARG	Darío Sarmiento (loan return to Tigre)

==== RSCA Futures ====
In:

No.	Pos.	Nation	Player
—	MF	BEL	Dwight Ede Eriyo (promoted from Anderlecht U18)
—	MF	SEN	Omar Sarr (from Diambars)

Out:

No.	Pos.	Nation	Player
34	MF	BEL	Jarne Flies (on loan to Lecce)
59	MF	BEL	Lilian Vergeylen (to Knokke)
77	MF	BEL	Naoufal Bohamdi-Kamoni (to Westerlo)

==== RWDM ====
In:

No.	Pos.	Nation	Player

Out:

No.	Pos.	Nation	Player
56	MF	BEL	Tim Bazelmans (to Crossing Schaerbeek)
77	MF	PAR	Matías Segovia (released)
84	MF	FRA	Mohamed El Arouch (released)

==== Seraing ====
In:

No.	Pos.	Nation	Player
—	MF	LUX	Diego Duarte (on loan from Metz B)

Out:

No.	Pos.	Nation	Player
12	DF	BEL	Vangelis Costoulas (to Crossing Schaerbeek)
29	GK	BEL	Arthur De Bolle (on loan to Crossing Schaerbeek)

== See also ==
- 2025–26 Belgian Pro League
