= Samuel Gueulette =

Rwandan footballer

Personal information
- Full name: Samuel Léopold Marie Gueulette
- Date of birth: 19 May 2000 (age 26)
- Place of birth: Kigali, Rwanda
- Height: 1.82 m (6 ft 0 in)
- Position: Midfielder

Team information
- Current team: UTA Arad
- Number: 14

Youth career
- 2006–2007: Académie Jeunesse Molenbeek
- 2007–2010: VK Sint-Agatha-Berchem
- 2010–2014: RWDM Brussels
- 2014–2019: Gent

Senior career*
Years	Team	Apps	(Gls)
2019–2020	Tubize	14	(1)
2020	Roeselare	0	(0)
2021–2026	RAAL La Louvière	134	(6)
2026–	UTA Arad	3	(0)

International career^{‡}
2018	Rwanda U20	2	(0)
2018	Rwanda U23	1	(0)
2021–	Rwanda	12	(0)
- * Club domestic league appearances and goals as of 24 October 2026 ‡ National team caps and goals as of 27 March 2026

Samuel Léopold Marie Gueulette (born 19 May 2000) is a Rwandan professional footballer who plays as a midfielder for Liga I club UTA Arad and the Rwanda national team.

== Professional career ==
Gueulette began his senior career with the Belgian club Tubize, before transferring to Roeselare on 27 July 2020.

== International career ==
Gueulette was born in Rwanda to a Belgian father and Rwandan mother, and moved to Belgium at a young age. He represented the Rwanda U20 for a pair of 2019 Africa U-20 Cup of Nations qualification matches in 2018. He was also called up for the Rwanda U23s for a 2019 Africa U-23 Cup of Nations qualification match in 2018. He debuted for the senior Rwanda national team in a 2–0 friendly win over the Central African Republic on 3 June 2021.

== Career statistics ==
=== Club ===
As of match played 24 October 2026

Appearances and goals by club, season and competition
Club	Season	League			National cup (Note: Includes Belgian Cup)		Europe		Other		Total	
Club	Season	Division	Apps	Goals	Apps	Goals	Apps	Goals	Apps	Goals	Apps	Goals
Tubize	2019–20	Belgian First Amateur Division	14	1	0	0	—		—		14	1
Roeselare	2020–21	1. MFL	0	0	—		—		—		0	0
RAAL La Louvière	2021–22	Belgian Division 2	20	4	0	0	—		—		20	4
RAAL La Louvière	2022–23	Belgian Division 1	29	1	1	0	—		—		30	1
RAAL La Louvière	2023–24	Belgian Division 1	29	0	3	1	—		—		32	1
RAAL La Louvière	2024–25	Challenger Pro League	26	1	1	0	—		—		27	1
RAAL La Louvière	2025–26	Belgian Pro League	29	0	3	0	—		—		32	0
RAAL La Louvière	2026–27	Belgian Pro League	1	0	—		—		—		1	0
RAAL La Louvière	Total		134	6	8	1	—		—		142	7
UTA Arad	2026–27	Liga I	3	0	0	0	—		—		3	0
Career total			151	7	8	1	—		—		159	8

=== International ===
As of match played 27 March 2026

Appearances and goals by national team and year
National team	Year	Apps	Goals
Rwanda	2021	1	0
Rwanda	2022	0	0
Rwanda	2023	0	0
Rwanda	2024	8	0
Rwanda	2025	2	0
Rwanda	2026	1	0
Total		12	0

== Honours ==
La Louvière

- Belgian National Division 1: 2023–24
- Belgian National Division 2: 2021–22
