= 2024–25 Club NXT season =

Club NXT
2024–25 season
- Manager: Robin Veldman (until 20 March); Mitch Delcour (from 21 March)
- Stadium: The NEST
- Challenger Pro League: 6th
- Top goalscorer: League: Shandre Campbell (9); All: Shandre Campbell (9)

The 2024–25 season was the fifth season in the history of the Club NXT, and the club's third consecutive season in Challenger Pro League.

== Competitions ==
=== Overall record ===
Competition	First match	Last match	Starting round	Final position	Record							
Competition	First match	Last match	Starting round	Final position	Pld	W	D	L	GF	GA	GD	Win %
Challenger Pro League	17 August 2024	18 April 2025	Matchday 1	6th	28	14	5	9	46	35	+11	50.00
Total					28	14	5	9	46	35	+11	50.00

Source: Competitions

=== Challenger Pro League ===
==== League table ====
Pos	Team	Pld	W	D	L	GF	GA	GD	Pts	Qualification
4	Beveren	28	14	9	5	41	27	+14	51	Qualification for promotion play-offs
5	Patro Eisden Maasmechelen	28	13	10	5	51	28	+23	49	Qualification for promotion play-offs
6	Club NXT	28	14	5	9	46	35	+11	47	Ineligible for promotion, promotion play-offs and (from matchday 24 on) also relegation
7	Lokeren-Temse	28	12	5	11	32	35	−3	41 (Note: Initially, Lokeren-Temse had not applied for a footballing license to play at the highest level of Belgian football. After the deadline had passed, the club had decided to apply for a license after all, but on 17 April this was denied. The club was therefore initially not allowed to participate in the promotion play-offs but appealed the decision, which allowed them to participate (instead of next placed Lierse). A final verdict still needs to be given, meaning that even if Lokeren-Temse were to win the promotion play-offs, they might still be denied promotion.)	Qualification for promotion play-offs
8	Lierse	28	11	7	10	40	35	+5	40	

Source: Challenger Pro League
Rules for classification: 1) Points; 2) Matches won; 3) Goal difference; 4) Goals scored; 5) Away matches won; 6) Away goal difference; 7) Away goals made.

==== Results summary ====
Overall								Home						Away					
Pld	W	D	L	GF	GA	GD	Pts	W	D	L	GF	GA	GD	W	D	L	GF	GA	GD
28	14	5	9	46	35	+11	47	8	1	5	23	16	+7	6	4	4	23	19	+4

Source: Worldfootball

==== Results by round ====
Round	1
Ground	
Result	
Position	

Source: Worldfootball
A = Away; H = Home; W = Win; D = Draw; L = Loss

==== Matches ====
The match schedule was released on 11 June 2024.

17 August 2024 1	Club NXT	4–0	Lokeren-Temse	Roeselare
				Stadium: The NEST

24 August 2024 2	La Louvière	1–1	Club NXT

31 August 2024 3	Patro Eisden Maasmechelen	2–2	Club NXT

13 September 2024 4	Club NXT	1–1	RFC Seraing

22 September 2024 5	Deinze	2–0; Voided	Club NXT

28 September 2024 6	Club NXT	2–0	Beveren

6 October 2024 7	Zulte Waregem	2–1	Club NXT

19 October 2024 8	Club NXT	3–1	Lierse

27 October 2024 9	RFC Liège	1–1	Club NXT

1 November 2024 10	Club NXT	1–3	Lommel

9 November 2024 11	Jong Genk	1–2	Club NXT

22 November 2024 12	Club NXT	0–4	Eupen

1 December 2024 13	Royal Francs Borains	1–2	Club NXT

6 December 2024 14	Club NXT	3–0	RSCA Futures

15 December 2024 15	RWD Molenbeek	1–0	Club NXT

20 December 2024 16	Club NXT	0–3	Zulte Waregem

17	Bye

19 January 2025 18	Lierse	1–3	Club NXT

26 January 2025 19	Club NXT	2–1	La Louvière

1 February 2025 20	RSCA Futures	2–3	Club NXT

7 February 2025 21	Lommel	0–2	Club NXT

16 February 2025 22	Club NXT	0–1	RWD Molenbeek

22 February 2025 23	Lokeren-Temse	2–1	Club NXT

1 March 2025 24	Club NXT	0–1	Patro Eisden Maasmechelen

7 March 2025 25	RFC Seraing	2–3	Club NXT

14 March 2025 26	Club NXT	3–0	Jong Genk

30 March 2025 27	Eupen	1–0	Club NXT

5 April 2025 28	Club NXT	2–1	RFC Liège

13 April 2025 29	Beveren	2–2	Club NXT

18 April 2025 30	Club NXT	2–0	Royal Francs Borains
