= 2024–25 KMSK Deinze season =

K.M.S.K. Deinze
2024–25 season
- Stadium: Dakota Arena
- Challenger Pro League: Pre-season
- Belgian Cup: Pre-season

The 2024–25 season is the 99th season in the history of the K.M.S.K. Deinze, and the club's fifth consecutive season in Challenger Pro League. In addition to the domestic league, the team is scheduled to participate in the Belgian Cup.

== Competitions ==
=== Overall record ===
| Competition | First match | Last match | Starting round | Record | | | | | | | |
| Competition | First match | Last match | Starting round | Pld | W | D | L | GF | GA | GD | Win % |
|---|---|---|---|---|---|---|---|---|---|---|---|
| Challenger Pro League | 17 August 2024 | 18–20 April 2025 | Matchday 1 | 0 | 0 | 0 | 0 | 0 | 0 | +0 | — |
| Belgian Cup | | | | 0 | 0 | 0 | 0 | 0 | 0 | +0 | — |
| Total | | | | 0 | 0 | 0 | 0 | 0 | 0 | +0 | — |

Source: Competitions

=== Challenger Pro League ===
==== League table ====
| Pos | Team | Pld | W | D | L | GF | GA | GD | Pts | Qualification |
|---|---|---|---|---|---|---|---|---|---|---|
| 12 | Francs Borains | 28 | 8 | 4 | 16 | 29 | 50 | −21 | 28 | |
| 13 | RSCA Futures | 28 | 5 | 8 | 15 | 41 | 54 | −13 | 23 | Ineligible for promotion, promotion play-offs and (from matchday 24 on) also relegation |
| 14 | Seraing | 28 | 3 | 10 | 15 | 28 | 55 | −27 | 19 | |
| 15 | Jong Genk | 28 | 3 | 5 | 20 | 30 | 62 | −32 | 14 (Note: The Pro League approved the new competition format for the coming seasons by the end of February. Part of the haggling between club presidents resulted in a new rule for the ongoing season which entered with immediate effect, stating that a minimum of four U23 would always need to be present in the Challenger Pro League. As only three teams are currently present, all three will be spared of relegation in case of ending in a relegation spot. At the time of the decision, there were still seven matchdays to play and Jong Genk was in a relegation spot. In case they overtake a non-U23 team, that team would however have face relegation. After the penultimate matchday, with Jong Genk now mathematically certain of finishing in 15th, the Pro League announced that Jong Genk had been relegated after all. Apparently, the league reform as decided and announced at the end of February was still not officially approved. On 16 June 2025, just weeks before the start of the 2025–26 Challenger Pro League, the Pro League announced that the High Council of the Belgian FA had approved the reform, meaning Jong Genk would be able to remain at the second level. The One week later, on 1 July 2025, Francs Borains, Lokeren-Temse and Seraing together launched a formal appeal against the reform citing it unfair that U23 cannot be relegated whilst non-U23 teams can. Should the Belgian Competition Authority rule in their favor, the start of the 2025–26 Challenger Pro League could be postponed. Meanwhile the new calendar, including Jong Genk, was already released on 3 July 2025.) | Ineligible for promotion, promotion play-offs and (from matchday 24 on) also relegation |
| 16 | Deinze (R) | 0 | 0 | 0 | 0 | 0 | 0 | 0 | −3 (Note: On 12 November 2024, Deinze was deducted 3 points for outstanding unpaid player wages. One month later, on 11 December 2024, the club was declared bankrupt and all its results were voided. The club will be considered last and only one other team will be relegated.) | Relegated to National Division 1 |

Source: Challenger Pro League
Rules for classification: 1) Points; 2) Matches won; 3) Goal difference; 4) Goals scored; 5) Away matches won; 6) Away goal difference; 7) Away goals made.
(R) Relegated

==== Results summary ====
| Overall | | | | | | | | Home | | | | | | Away | | | | | |
| Pld | W | D | L | GF | GA | GD | Pts | W | D | L | GF | GA | GD | W | D | L | GF | GA | GD |
|---|---|---|---|---|---|---|---|---|---|---|---|---|---|---|---|---|---|---|---|
| 0 | 0 | 0 | 0 | 0 | 0 | 0 | 0 | 0 | 0 | 0 | 0 | 0 | 0 | 0 | 0 | 0 | 0 | 0 | 0 |

Last updated: August 2024.
Source: Worldfootball

==== Results by round ====
| Round | 1 |
|---|---|
| Ground | |
| Result | |
| Position | |

Updated to match(es) played on August 2024. Source: Worldfootball
A = Away; H = Home; W = Win; D = Draw; L = Loss

==== Matches ====
The match schedule was released on 11 June 2024.

| August 2024 | Deinze | v |
