= Lucien Delaigle =

Burundian footballer (born 2004)

Personal information
- Full name: Lucien Léonard Delaigle
- Date of birth: 31 March 2004 (age 22)
- Place of birth: Belgium
- Height: 1.87 m (6 ft 2 in)
- Position: Midfielder

Team information
- Current team: FC Ganshoren, on loan from R.W.D. Molenbeek

Youth career
- Eendracht Aalst
- 2018–2019: Lokeren
- 2019–2022: Gent
- 2022–2024: R.W.D. Molenbeek

Senior career*
Years	Team	Apps	(Gls)
2024–	R.W.D. Molenbeek	0	(0)
2024–	→ FC Ganshoren (loan)	1	(0)

International career^{‡}
2024–	Burundi	2	(0)
- * Club domestic league appearances and goals as of 02:55, 27 August 2024 (UTC) ‡ National team caps and goals as of 02:55, 27 August 2024 (UTC)

Lucien Léonard Delaigle (born 31 March 2004) is a professional footballer who plays as a midfielder for the Challenger Pro League club FC Ganshoren, on loan from R.W.D. Molenbeek. Born in Belgium, he plays for the Burundi national team.

== Career ==
Delaigle is a youth product of Eendracht Aalst, Lokeren, Gent and R.W.D. Molenbeek. He was promoted to RWDM's U21 side in 2023.

== International career ==
Born in Belgium, Delaigle is of Burundian and Belgian descent. He debuted for the Burundi national team in a friendly 1–0 loss to Madagascar on 22 March 2024.
