= 2024–25 Challenger Pro League =

Challenger Pro League
- Season: 2024–25
- Champions: Zulte Waregem
- Promoted: Zulte Waregem; La Louvière
- Relegated: Deinze
- Top goalscorer: Jelle Vossen (15 goals)

The 2024–25 season of the Challenger Pro League began on 16 August 2024 and ended in May 2025. It was the third season under its new name after being renamed from First Division B. Zulte Waregem finished first and won promotion to the Belgian Pro League for the 2025–26 season, with La Louvière joining alongside them.

== Team changes ==
=== Incoming ===
- La Louvière and Lokeren-Temse were promoted from the 2023–24 Belgian National Division 1. Both clubs will play their first-ever season at the second level, although they both represent new versions of older successful defunct teams that even played at the highest level: R.A.A. Louviéroise and K.S.C. Lokeren Oost-Vlaanderen. If counting those teams, they returned after 15 and 4 year absences, respectively.
- Eupen and RWDM were relegated from the 2023–24 Belgian Pro League. Eupen returns after 8 years in the top flight, RWDM after just one.

=== Outgoing ===
- Beerschot and Dender EH were promoted to the 2024–25 Belgian Pro League as champions and runners-up.
- SL16 FC were relegated to the 2024–25 Belgian National Division 1 after finishing in the bottom position.
- Oostende dissolved at the end of last season.

=== Name change ===
- Lierse Kempenzonen announced on 13 June 2024 that it had received approval to change the club name to Koninklijke Lierse Sportkring, thereby taking the same name Lierse as the former now defunct club Lierse SK.

== Team information ==
=== Stadiums and locations ===
Locations of the 2024–25 Challenger Pro League teams

Matricule	Club	City	First season of current spell at second level	Coming from	2023–24 result	Stadium	Capacity
4068	Beveren	Beveren	2021–22	Belgian First Division B	8th (CPL)	Freethiel Stadion	8,190
3	Club NXT	Bruges (Note: Club NXT did not play its home matches at the same venue as the A-squad of Club Brugge (the Jan Breydel Stadium) but rather they moved to Roeselare to play in the Schiervelde Stadion.)	2022–23	U23 competition	9th (CPL)	Schiervelde Stadion	8,340
818	Deinze	Deinze	2020–21	Belgian First Amateur Division	3rd (CPL)	Burgemeester Van de Wiele Stadion	7,515
4276	Eupen	Eupen	2024–25	Belgian Pro League	16th (BPL)	Kehrwegstadion	8,363
5192	Francs Borains	Boussu	2023–24	Belgian National Division 1	14th (CPL)	Stade Robert Urbain	6,000
322	Jong Genk	Genk	2022–23	U23 competition	10th (CPL)	Luminus Arena	24,956
94	La Louvière	La Louvière	2024–25	Belgian National Division 1	1st (NatD1)	Stade du Tivoli	12,500
3970	Lierse	Lier	2020–21	Belgian First Amateur Division	11th (CPL)	Herman Vanderpoortenstadion	14,538
4297	Lokeren-Temse	Lokeren	2024–25	Belgian National Division 1	2nd (NatD1)	Daknamstadion	12,136
2554	Lommel SK	Lommel	2018–19	Belgian First Amateur Division	4th (CPL)	Soevereinstadion	8,000
3434	Patro Eisden Maasmechelen	Maasmechelen	2023–24	Belgian National Division 1	6th (CPL)	Gemeentelijk Sportparkstadion	5,500
4	RFC Liège	Liège	2023–24	Belgian National Division 1	7th (CPL)	Stade de Rocourt	8,000
167	RFC Seraing	Seraing	2023–24	Belgian Pro League	15th (CPL)	Stade du Pairay	8,207
35	RSCA Futures	Anderlecht, Brussels	2022–23	U23 competition	12th (CPL)	King Baudouin Stadium	38,000
5479	RWD Molenbeek	Molenbeek, Brussels	2024–25	Belgian Pro League	15th (BPL)	Edmond Machtens Stadium	12,266
5381	Zulte Waregem	Waregem	2023–24	Belgian Pro League	5th (CPL)	Regenboogstadion	12,500

== Regular season ==
=== League table ===
Pos	Team	Pld	W	D	L	GF	GA	GD	Pts	Qualification
1	Zulte Waregem (C, P)	28	18	5	5	55	30	+25	59	Promoted to Pro League
2	La Louvière (P)	28	17	8	3	50	24	+26	59	Promoted to Pro League
3	RWD Molenbeek	28	17	6	5	42	21	+21	57	Qualification for promotion play-offs
4	Beveren	28	14	9	5	41	27	+14	51	Qualification for promotion play-offs
5	Patro Eisden Maasmechelen	28	13	10	5	51	28	+23	49	Qualification for promotion play-offs
6	Club NXT	28	14	5	9	46	35	+11	47	Ineligible for promotion, promotion play-offs and (from matchday 24 on) also relegation
7	Lokeren-Temse	28	12	5	11	32	35	−3	41 (Note: Initially, Lokeren-Temse had not applied for a footballing license to play at the highest level of Belgian football. After the deadline had passed, the club had decided to apply for a license after all, but on 17 April this was denied. The club was therefore initially not allowed to participate in the promotion play-offs but appealed the decision, which allowed them to participate (instead of next placed Lierse). A final verdict still needs to be given, meaning that even if Lokeren-Temse were to win the promotion play-offs, they might still be denied promotion.)	Qualification for promotion play-offs
8	Lierse	28	11	7	10	40	35	+5	40	
9	RFC Liège	28	9	7	12	38	44	−6	34	
10	Eupen	28	8	6	14	38	47	−9	30	
11	Lommel	28	8	5	15	32	46	−14	29	
12	Francs Borains	28	8	4	16	29	50	−21	28	
13	RSCA Futures	28	5	8	15	41	54	−13	23	Ineligible for promotion, promotion play-offs and (from matchday 24 on) also relegation
14	Seraing	28	3	10	15	28	55	−27	19	
15	Jong Genk	28	3	5	20	30	62	−32	14 (Note: The Pro League approved the new competition format for the coming seasons by the end of February. Part of the haggling between club presidents resulted in a new rule for the ongoing season which entered with immediate effect, stating that a minimum of four U23 would always need to be present in the Challenger Pro League. As only three teams are currently present, all three will be spared of relegation in case of ending in a relegation spot. At the time of the decision, there were still seven matchdays to play and Jong Genk was in a relegation spot. In case they overtake a non-U23 team, that team would however have face relegation. After the penultimate matchday, with Jong Genk now mathematically certain of finishing in 15th, the Pro League announced that Jong Genk had been relegated after all. Apparently, the league reform as decided and announced at the end of February was still not officially approved. On 16 June 2025, just weeks before the start of the 2025–26 Challenger Pro League, the Pro League announced that the High Council of the Belgian FA had approved the reform, meaning Jong Genk would be able to remain at the second level. The One week later, on 1 July 2025, Francs Borains, Lokeren-Temse and Seraing together launched a formal appeal against the reform citing it unfair that U23 cannot be relegated whilst non-U23 teams can. Should the Belgian Competition Authority rule in their favor, the start of the 2025–26 Challenger Pro League could be postponed. Meanwhile the new calendar, including Jong Genk, was already released on 3 July 2025.)	Ineligible for promotion, promotion play-offs and (from matchday 24 on) also relegation
16	Deinze (R)	0	0	0	0	0	0	0	−3 (Note: On 12 November 2024, Deinze was deducted 3 points for outstanding unpaid player wages. One month later, on 11 December 2024, the club was declared bankrupt and all its results were voided. The club will be considered last and only one other team will be relegated.)	Relegated to National Division 1

Source: Challenger Pro League
Rules for classification: 1) Points; 2) Matches won; 3) Goal difference; 4) Goals scored; 5) Away matches won; 6) Away goal difference; 7) Away goals made.
(C) Champions; (P) Promoted; (R) Relegated

=== Positions by round ===
The table lists the positions of teams after the completion of each round, with postponed matches and points deductions only included when occurring. Teams with fewer matches played are shown with their position underlined, with each line representing one fewer match.

- On 12 November, between matchdays 11 and 12, Deinze was deducted 3 points for outstanding unpaid player wages.
- On 11 December, between matchdays 14 and 15, Deinze was declared bankrupt and all their results voided. The team will be classified last and only one other team will be relegated.
- Due to snow, several matches of matchday 17 were postponed: Lokeren-Temse vs Eupen, Lommel vs Francs Borains, RSCA Futures vs Jong Genk and Seraing vs Lierse. All four matches were rescheduled for the midweek of 28–29 January, in between matchdays 19 and 20.
- On 27 February, between matchdays 23 and 24, the Pro League approved the new competition format for the coming seasons. Part of the haggling between club presidents resulted in a new rule for the ongoing season which entered with immediate effect, stating that a minimum of four U23 would always need to be present in the Challenger Pro League. As only three teams are currently present, all three will be spared of relegation in case of ending in a relegation spot. When it was however mathematically certain Jong Genk would end 15th, the Pro League announced Jong Genk would get relegated, as the league reform had not received approval (yet).

"Colored cells" refer to being promoted (green), in promotion play-offs (yellow), or in relegation play-offs (red). Note that U23 teams are ineligible for promotion and playoffs, and the coloring is adjusted accordingly. Furthermore, if one of the mother clubs of these three teams is relegated, the U23 would automatically take up one of the relegation spots as U23 teams always have to remain at least one level below their mother club, this is not accounted for in the coloring until after the season.

Team ╲ Round	1	2	3	4	5	6	7	8	9	10	11	12	13	14	15	16	17	18	19	20	21	22	23	24	25	26	27	28	29	30
Zulte Waregem	12	11	11	5	4	2	2	1	2	3	2	1	1	1	1	1	1	1	1	1	1	1	1	1	2	2	2	2	2	1
La Louvière	6	9	3	2	2	3	4	3	3	2	3	2	2	2	2	2	2	2	3	3	3	3	3	3	3	3	3	3	3	2
RWD Molenbeek	9	7	2	1	1	1	1	2	1	1	1	3	3	3	3	3	3	3	2	2	2	2	2	2	1	1	1	1	1	3
Beveren	5	8	9	3	8	9	11	11	10	11	9	7	7	8	6	5	5	6	6	7	7	6	5	5	5	5	5	4	4	4
Patro Eisden Maasmechelen	8	6	8	11	7	4	3	4	4	6	4	4	4	4	4	4	4	4	4	4	4	4	4	4	4	4	4	5	5	5
Club NXT (Note: ineligible for promotion and playoffs. Between matchdays 23-29 also ineligible for relegation, as well as after the season.)	1	3	7	10	11	8	10	7	8	8	7	8	6	5	5	7	7	5	5	5	5	5	6	6	6	6	6	6	6	6
Lokeren-Temse	16	15	16	16	16	15	14	15	13	10	11	12	12	14	10	11	11	11	10	13	13	12	9	9	9	9	8	7	7	7
Lierse	7	2	5	9	6	7	5	6	7	7	8	6	8	7	7	6	6	7	7	6	6	7	7	7	7	7	7	8	8	8
RFC Liège	15	16	13	13	14	13	13	12	11	12	10	11	9	9	13	9	9	9	8	8	8	8	8	8	8	8	9	9	9	9
Eupen	3	5	10	12	12	10	8	9	9	9	12	10	11	11	9	10	10	10	13	9	10	11	12	12	11	11	10	10	10	10
Lommel	10	13	12	7	5	6	7	8	5	4	5	5	5	6	8	8	8	8	9	10	11	13	13	13	12	12	12	11	11	11
Francs Borains	11	10	6	8	10	12	12	13	14	15	15	14	16	13	11	12	12	12	11	11	9	9	10	10	10	10	11	12	12	12
RSCA Futures	14	14	15	15	15	16	16	16	16	16	16	15	13	15	12	14	14	14	14	12	12	10	11	11	13	13	13	13	13	13
Seraing	13	12	14	14	13	14	15	14	15	14	13	16	14	12	14	13	13	13	12	14	14	14	14	14	14	14	14	14	14	14
Jong Genk	4	1	4	6	9	11	9	10	12	13	14	13	15	16	15	15	15	15	15	15	15	15	15	15	15	15	15	15	15	15
Deinze	2	4	1	4	3	5	6	5	6	5	6	9	10	10	16	16	16	16	16	16	16	16	16	16	16	16	16	16	16	16

Source: vbal4.be

=== Results ===
Home \ Away	ZWA	LAL	RWD	BEV	PEM	NXT	L-T	LIE	RFC	EUP	LOM	FRB	AND	SER	GNK	DEI
Zulte Waregem		2–1	2–1	4–0	3–2	2–1	1–0	0–1	3–1	3–2	0–1	2–2	3–1	5–1	3–1	~~7 Feb~~ (Note: Matches cancelled as Deinze was declared bankrupt on 11 December.)
La Louvière	0–0		0–0	2–0	0–2	1–1	2–0	2–1	3–1	2–0	5–1	2–1	2–2	4–1	2–1	~~12 Apr~~
RWD Molenbeek	2–1	1–1		0–2	1–1	1–0	1–0	3–0	2–1	2–1	0–1	1–0	1–0	3–0	1–0	~~3–2~~ (Note: Results voided on 11 December as Deinze was declared bankrupt.)
Beveren	3–2	0–0	0–2		0–0	2–2	0–1	1–0	3–1	3–0	2–1	4–0	1–1	0–0	3–2	~~26 Jan~~
Patro Eisden Maasmechelen	0–1	1–1	1–1	1–2		2–2	4–1	3–3	2–0	1–0	4–0	4–1	3–1	2–3	1–0	~~3–1~~
Club NXT	0–3	2–1	0–1	2–0	0–1		4–0	3–1	2–1	0–4	1–3	2–0	3–0	1–1	3–0	~~12 Jan~~
Lokeren-Temse	2–0	0–5	1–4	0–1	2–2	2–1		1–1	2–1	0–0 (Note: Several matches in the weekend of 10–12 January were postponed due to snow and rescheduled for 28–29 January.)	1–0	0–1	0–1	0–1	4–0	~~0–0~~
Lierse	0–0	1–2	0–0	0–1	1–0	1–3	2–2		2–1	3–0	1–0	4–0	3–1	3–2	2–2	~~0–1~~
RFC Liège	1–1	1–1	2–1	0–0	2–2	1–1	0–1	2–1		0–3	1–1	0–1	3–3	2–1	3–1	~~3–0~~
Eupen	1–3	3–4	0–1	2–2	0–4	1–0	0–1	1–3	0–1		3–2	3–1	2–2	2–1	3–1	~~14 Dec~~
Lommel	1–2	1–2	0–2	1–2	0–1	0–2	1–1	1–1	0–2	1–1		1–2	2–1	2–2	2–0	~~1–1~~
Francs Borains	1–3	0–1	1–2	0–0	1–3	1–2	1–2	1–0	1–2	3–2	1–3		3–2	0–1	2–2	~~28 Mar~~
RSCA Futures	2–3	1–2	2–1	0–4	1–1	2–3	0–2	2–0	2–4	2–2	5–0	0–1		1–1	4–1	~~1–4~~
Seraing	0–0	0–1	4–4	0–2	0–0	2–3	0–4	0–2	0–3	1–2	1–2	1–1	2–2		0–2	~~23 Feb~~
Jong Genk	2–3	0–1	0–3	3–3	1–3	1–2	1–2	1–3	4–1	0–0	0–4	1–2	1–0	2–2		~~7 Mar~~
Deinze	~~2–2~~	~~1–2~~	~~1 Mar~~	~~3–1~~	~~14 Feb~~	~~2–0~~	~~31 Jan~~	~~5 Apr~~	~~18 Apr~~	~~15 Mar~~	~~17 Jan~~	~~0–3~~	~~21 Dec~~	~~0–1~~	~~1–0~~	

Updated to match(es) played on 18 April 2025. Source: Flashscore
Legend: Blue = home team win; Yellow = draw; Red = away team win.

== Promotion play-offs ==
=== Promotion/relegation play-offs ===
The promotion/relegation play-offs are contested by the four highest eligible finishers not already promoted directly. Normally this would be the teams in positions 3 to 6 in the 2024–25 Challenger Pro League, but as Club NXT (6th, U23-team) was ineligible, Lokeren-Temse (7th) took the final spot. At the time the play-offs started however, Lokeren-Temse had not been awarded a license to play at the highest level for the coming season which would have made them ineligible to compete. The club launched an appeal against this decision however which meant that the negative license decision was suspended and they could take part. Should the appeal however be rejected, the club will not be able to promote. These four teams meet in a knockout tournament with both quarter-finals and semi-finals over two legs, and the highest season finisher always having home advantage in the return leg. The winner of the semi-finals will play the 14th place finisher of the 2024–25 Belgian Pro League over two legs. The Belgian Pro League team will have home advantage in the return leg; the winner of the final will qualify to play in the 2025–26 Belgian Pro League, with the loser playing in the 2025–26 Challenger Pro League.

==== Bracket ====
Quarter-finals
7	Lokeren-Temse	2	2	4
3	RWD Molenbeek	0	3	3
5	Patro Eisden Maasmechelen	3	2	5
4	Beveren	2	1	3

Semi-finals
7	Lokeren-Temse	1	1	2
5	Patro Eisden Maasmechelen	2	1	3

Finals
14	Cercle Brugge	5	3	8
5	Patro Eisden Maasmechelen	1	1	2

==== Quarter-finals ====
24 April 2025
20:30 CEST

Lokeren-Temse	2–0	RWD Molenbeek
Preijs 10' (o.g.); Vinck 14'	Report

Daknamstadion, Lokeren
Attendance: 2,676
Referee: Massimiliano Ledda
27 April 2025
19:15 CEST

RWD Molenbeek	3–2	Lokeren-Temse
Biron 34' (pen.); Sapata 53'; Robail 71'	Report	Nainggolan 85'; Ntamack 88'

Edmond Machtens Stadium, Molenbeek-Saint-Jean
Attendance: 2,869
Referee: Klass Clerkx

Lokeren-Temse won 4–3 on aggregate.

24 April 2025
20:30 CEST

Patro Eisden Maasmechelen	3–2	Beveren
Kiankaulua 25'; Abid 40', 51'; Kis (yellow card) 49' (yellow-red card) 70'	Report	Mertens 38'; Jans 71'

Patro Stadion, Maasmechelen
Attendance: 1,011
Referee: Wesli De Cremer
27 April 2025
19:15 CEST

Beveren	1–2	Patro Eisden Maasmechelen
Brüls (red card) 32'; Mertens 86'	Report	Kiankaulua 33'; Peeters 56'

Freethiel Stadion, Beveren
Attendance: 4,346
Referee: Kevin Van Damme

Patro Eisden Maasmechelen won 5–3 on aggregate.

==== Semi-finals ====
3 May 2025
16:00 CEST

Lokeren-Temse	1–2	Patro Eisden Maasmechelen
Ntamack 63' (pen.)	Report	Bammens 34', 78'

Daknamstadion, Lokeren
Attendance: 5,062
Referee: Bert Verbeke
11 May 2025
16:00 CEST

Patro Eisden Maasmechelen	1–1	Lokeren-Temse
Kis 38' (pen.), (yellow card) 45+2' (yellow-red card) 64'	Report	Brebels 5'; Boonen (red card) 79'

Patro Stadion, Maasmechelen
Attendance: 2,385
Referee: Nathan Verboomen

Patro Eisden Maasmechelen won 3–2 on aggregate.

==== Finals ====
18 May 2025
19:15 CEST

Patro Eisden Maasmechelen	1–5	Cercle Brugge
Mabanza 90+3'	Report	Agyekum 8'; Brunner 25', 51'; Felipe Augusto 58'; Somers 84'

Patro Stadion, Maasmechelen
Attendance: 5,000
Referee: Nicolas Laforge
23 May 2025
20:45 CEST

Cercle Brugge	3–1	Patro Eisden Maasmechelen
Nazinho 5'; Felipe Augusto 24' (pen.); Nunes 78'	Report	Van Landschoot 67'

Jan Breydel Stadium, Brugge
Attendance: 7,932
Referee: Wim Smet

Cercle Brugge won 8–2 on aggregate.

== Season statistics ==
=== Top scorers ===
As of 18 April 2025.

Note that following the bankruptcy of Deinze on 11 December, all goals made in matches involving Deinze were removed as these matches were voided.

Rank	Player	Club	Goals
1	(Belgium) Jelle Vossen	Zulte Waregem	15
2	(Algeria) Mouhamed Belkheir	La Louvière	14
2	(Belgium) Lennart Mertens	Beveren	14
4	(Haiti) Mondy Prunier	Francs Borains	10
5	(South Africa) Shandre Campbell	Club NXT	9
5	(Poland) Piotr Parzyszek	RWD Molenbeek	9
7	(Belgium) Simon Bammens	Patro Eisden Maasmechelen	8
7	(Belgium) Lenn De Smet	Club NXT	8
7	(Belgium) Kaye Furo	Club NXT	8
7	(Mali) Mohamed Guindo	La Louvière	8
7	(France) Ryan Merlen	RFC Liège	8
7	(France) Samuel Ntamack	Lokeren-Temse	8
7	(Belgium) Mathis Servais	Beveren	8
7	(Belgium) Keano Vanrafelghem	Patro Eisden Maasmechelen	8
7	(Comoros) Bryan Adinany	Lierse	7
9	(Belgium) Lynnt Audoor	Club NXT	7
9	(France) Flavio Da Silva	RFC Liège	7
9	(Cyprus) Stavros Gavriil	Zulte Waregem	7
9	(Turkey) Emrehan Gedikli	Eupen	7
9	(Japan) Keisuke Goto	RSCA Futures	7
9	(Belgium) Robin Mirisola	Jong Genk	7
9	(Belgium) Mohamed Salah	Lommel	7
9	(Scotland) Robbie Ure	RSCA Futures	7
9	(Morocco) Ilyes Ziani	RWD Molenbeek	7

6 goals (6 players)
- (Grenada) Regan Charles-Cook (Eupen)
- (Belgium) Glenn Claes (Lierse)
- (Senegal) Pape Moussa Fall (Seraing)
5 goals (6 players)
- (Luxembourg) Alessio Curci (Francs Borains)
- (Belgium) Jordan Renson (Patro Eisden Maasmechelen)
- (Belgium) Zakaria Atteri (RFC Liège)
- (France) Gaëtan Robail (RWD Molenbeek)
- (Senegal) Pape Diop (Zulte Waregem)
- (Denmark) Jeppe Erenbjerg (Zulte Waregem)
4 goals (15 players)
- (Belgium) Renaud Emond (Eupen)
- (Slovenia) Jan Gorenc (Eupen)
- (Belgium) Yentl Van Genechten (Eupen)
- (Belgium) Nolan Martens (Jong Genk)
- (Belgium) Cédric Nuozzi (Jong Genk)
- (Burundi) Jordi Liongola (La Louvière)
- (France) Maxime Pau (La Louvière)
- (Senegal) Ousmane Sow (Lierse)
- (Belgium) Sebastiaan Brebels (Lokeren-Temse)
- (Brazil) Diego Rosa (Lommel)
- (Belgium) Adnane Abid (Patro Eisden Maasmechelen)
- (Guinea) Bafodé Dansoko (Patro Eisden Maasmechelen)
- (Martinique) Mickaël Biron (RWD Molenbeek)
- (Senegal) Saliou Faye (Seraing)
- (Brazil) Matheus Machado (Zulte Waregem)
3 goals (25 players)
- (Belgium) Anthony Limbombe (Beveren)
- (Belgium) Jérôme Déom (Eupen)
- (France) Corenthyn Lavie (Francs Borains)
- (Belgium) Thomas Claes (Jong Genk)
- (France) Ivann Botella (La Louvière)
- (France) Kenny Nagera (La Louvière)
- (Belgium) Niklo Dailly (Lierse)
- (Belarus) Maksim Kireev (Lierse)
- (Venezuela) Daniel Pérez (Lokeren-Temse)
- (Spain) Álvaro Santos (Lommel)
- (Belgium) Lucas Schoofs (Lommel)
- (Netherlands) Jason van Duiven (Lommel)
- (Belgium) Kjetil Borry (Patro Eisden Maasmechelen)
- (France) Vicky Kiankaulua (Patro Eisden Maasmechelen)
- (Belgium) Kevin Kis (Patro Eisden Maasmechelen)
- (Belgium) Lukas Van Eenoo (Patro Eisden Maasmechelen)
- (Belgium) Mohamed Moulhi (RFC Liège)
- (Belgium) Nathan De Cat (RSCA Futures)
- (Belgium) Milan Robberechts (RSCA Futures)
- (Morocco) Anas Tajaouart (RSCA Futures)
- (Belgium) Pjotr Kestens (RWD Molenbeek)
- (Canada) Kwasi Poku (RWD Molenbeek)
- (Ivory Coast) Patrick Ouotro (Seraing)
- (Austria) Tobias Hedl (Zulte Waregem)
- (Ghana) Joseph Opoku (Zulte Waregem)
2 goals (37 players)
- (South Africa) Kurt Abrahams (Beveren)
- (Belgium) Alexander Corryn (Beveren)
- (Belgium) Guillaume De Schryver (Beveren)
- (Japan) Yutaka Michiwaki (Beveren)
- (Belgium) Siebe Wylin (Club NXT)
- (Belgium) Bertan Caliskan (Eupen)
- (France) Yanis Massolin (Francs Borains)
- (Belgium) Saïdou Touré (Jong Genk)
- (Japan) Yumeki Yoshinaga (Jong Genk)
- (Belgium) Adrien Bongiovanni (La Louvière)
- (France) Nolan Gillot (La Louvière)
- (France) Victor Daguin (Lierse)
- (Belgium) Pieter De Schrijver (Lierse)
- (Belgium) Beni Mpanzu (Lierse)
- (Belgium) Toon Janssen (Lokeren-Temse)
- (Belgium) Sam Van Aerschot (Lokeren-Temse)
- (Uruguay) Nicolás Siri (Lommel)
- (Belgium) Dries Wouters (Lommel)
- (Burundi) Vancy Mabanza (Patro Eisden Maasmechelen)
- (Belgium) Stef Peeters (Patro Eisden Maasmechelen)
- (Belgium) Jordan Bustin (RFC Liège)
- (France) Alexis Lefebvre (RFC Liège)
- (Ecuador) Nilson Angulo (RSCA Futures)
- (Belgium) Ismaël Baouf (RSCA Futures)
- (Belgium) Kaïs Barry (RSCA Futures)
- (France) Enzo Sternal (RSCA Futures)
- (Belgium) Lilian Vergeylen (RSCA Futures)
- (Japan) Shuto Abe (RWD Molenbeek)
- (Morocco) Aïman Maurer (RWD Molenbeek)
- (Angola) Marsoni Sambu (RWD Molenbeek)
- (France) Maxime Allione (Seraing)
- (Belgium) Simon Buggea (Seraing)
- (Belgium) Mathieu Cachbach (Seraing)
- (France) Marvin Tshibuabua (Seraing)
- (Belgium) Youssef Challouk (Zulte Waregem)
- (Belgium) Benoît Nyssen (Zulte Waregem)
- (Ivory Coast) Abdoulaye Traoré (Zulte Waregem)
1 goal (86 players)
- (Belgium) Sander Coopman (Beveren)
- (Belgium) Dylan Dassy (Beveren)
- (Croatia) Jakov Filipović (Beveren)
- (Belgium) Jay-Dee Geusens (Beveren)
- (Republic of Ireland) Liam Kerrigan (Beveren)
- (Morocco) Ahmed Khatir (Beveren)
- (Cameroon) Hadji Issa Moustapha (Beveren)
- (Belgium) Dries Wuytens (Beveren)
- (Belgium) Sem Audoor (Club NXT)
- (Belgium) Denzel De Roeve (Club NXT)
- (Belgium) Liam De Smet (Club NXT)
- (Norway) Benjamin Faraas (Club NXT)
- (Spain) Alejandro Granados (Club NXT)
- (Denmark) Tobias Lund Jensen (Club NXT)
- (Belgium) Hugo Siquet (Club NXT)
- (Belgium) Romeo Vermant (Club NXT)
- (France) Teddy Alloh (Eupen)
- (Belgium) Luca Dalla Costa (Eupen)
- (Senegal) Pape Niang (Eupen)
- (Ghana) Isaac Nuhu (Eupen)
- (Nigeria) Ade Oguns (Eupen)
- (Serbia) Miloš Pantović (Eupen)
- (Belgium) Dorian Dessoleil (Francs Borains)
- (Belgium) Jordy Gillekens (Francs Borains)
- (Tunisia) Jibril Othman (Francs Borains)
- (France) Kays Ruiz-Atil (Francs Borains)
- (Poland) Adrian Troć (Francs Borains)
- (Belgium) Michiel Cauwel (Jong Genk)
- (Belgium) Wilson Da Costa (Jong Genk)
- (Belgium) Saif Eddien Lazar (Jong Genk)
- (Belgium) Brad Manguelle (Jong Genk)
- (Belgium) Matthias Oyatambwe (Jong Genk)
- (Belgium) Luca Oyen (Jong Genk)
- (Netherlands) Raphaël Eyongo (La Louvière)
- (Togo) Fadel Gobitaka (La Louvière)
- (Rwanda) Samuel Gueulette (La Louvière)
- (Belgium) Joël Ito (La Louvière)
- (France) Owen Maës (La Louvière)
- (France) Maxence Maisonneuve (La Louvière)
- (Belgium) Sekou Sidibe (La Louvière)
- (Belgium) Wout De Buyser (Lierse)
- (Netherlands) Che Krabbendam (Lierse)
- (Belgium) Brent Laes (Lierse)
- (Netherlands) Luc Marijnissen (Lierse)
- (Belgium) Pietro Perdichizzi (Lierse)
- (Belgium) Aske Sampers (Lierse)
- (Democratic Republic of the Congo) Emmanuel Tshimbalanga (Lierse)
- (Belgium) Indy Boonen (Lokeren-Temse)
- (Madagascar) Nicolas Fontaine (Lokeren-Temse)
- (Belgium) Radja Nainggolan (Lokeren-Temse)
- (Belgium) Cederick Van Daele (Lokeren-Temse)
- (Belgium) Gil Van Moerzeke (Lokeren-Temse)
- (Netherlands) Sam De Grand (Lommel)
- (Mali) Ibrahima Kébé (Lommel)
- (Serbia) Filip Stevanović (Lommel)
- (Belgium) Tarek Loutfi (Patro Eisden Maasmechelen)
- (Senegal) Papa Demba Ndior (Patro Eisden Maasmechelen)
- (Netherlands) Raphaël Sarfo (Patro Eisden Maasmechelen)
- (Belgium) William Simba (Patro Eisden Maasmechelen)
- (Belgium) Jellert Van Landschoot (Patro Eisden Maasmechelen)
- (Belgium) Reno Wilmots (Patro Eisden Maasmechelen)
- (Belgium) Alessandro Albanese (RFC Liège)
- (Belgium) Benoît Bruggeman (RFC Liège)
- (Belgium) Alessio Cascio (RFC Liège)
- (Belgium) Jonathan D'Ostilio (RFC Liège)
- (France) Jérémie Lioka (RFC Liège)
- (Belgium) Pierre-Yves Ngawa (RFC Liège)
- (France) Théo Pierrot (RFC Liège)
- (Belgium) Tristan Degreef (RSCA Futures)
- (Belgium) Joren Dom (RSCA Futures)
- (Mali) Ibrahim Kanaté (RSCA Futures)
- (Guinea) Gassimou Sylla (RSCA Futures)
- (Democratic Republic of the Congo) Ludovick Wola-Wetshay (RSCA Futures)
- (Morocco) Soufiane Benjdida (RWD Molenbeek)
- (France) Islamdine Halifa (RWD Molenbeek)
- (Morocco) Achraf Laâziri (RWD Molenbeek)
- (Brazil) David Sousa (RWD Molenbeek)
- (Guinea) Mohamed Camara (Seraing)
- (France) Ruben Droehnlé (Seraing)
- (Belgium) Yannis Lawson (Seraing)
- (Belgium) Matthieu Muland (Seraing)
- (Belgium) Nils Schouterden (Seraing)
- (Iceland) Atli Barkarson (Zulte Waregem)
- (Senegal) Pape Diop (Zulte Waregem)
- (Belgium) Nicolas Rommens (Zulte Waregem)
- (Belgium) Anton Tanghe (Zulte Waregem)
1 own goal (10 players)
- (Belgium) Dries Wuytens (Beveren, scored for RWD Molenbeek)
- (Belgium) Luca Dalla Costa (Eupen, scored for Francs Borains)
- (Belgium) Yentl Van Genechten (Eupen, scored for Lokeren-Temse)
- (Belgium) Liam De Smet (Club NXT, scored for La Louvière)
- (Belgium) Jordy Gillekens (Francs Borains, scored for Zulte Waregem)
- (Ecuador) Alfred Caicedo (Jong Genk, scored for Lokeren-Temse)
- (Netherlands) Henk Dijkhuizen (Patro Eisden Maasmechelen, scored for Zulte Waregem)
- (Belgium) Nunzio Engwanda (RSCA Futures, scored for RFC Liège)
- (Belgium) Amando Lapage (RSCA Futures, scored for La Louvière)
- (France) Marvin Tshibuabua (Seraing, scored for Lierse)

== Number of teams by provinces ==
Number of teams	Province or region	Team(s)
3	East Flanders	Beveren, Deinze and Lokeren-Temse
3	Liège	Eupen, RFC Liège and Seraing
3	Limburg	Jong Genk, Lommel and Patro Eisden Maasmechelen
2	Brussels	RSCA Futures and RWD Molenbeek
2	Hainaut	Francs Borains and La Louvière
2	West Flanders	Club NXT and Zulte Waregem
1	Antwerp	Lierse

== Attendances ==
#	Club	Average	Highest
1	Zulte-Waregem	5,818	11,799
2	RWDM	3,005	4,954
3	Lokeren	2,955	6,300
4	Lierse	2,824	4,429
5	Beveren	2,813	4,800
6	RAAL	2,745	4,756
7	Liège	2,448	3,203
8	Eupen	1,589	2,395
9	Lommel	1,348	2,697
10	Francs Borains	1,312	2,886
11	Deinze	1,125	2,925
12	Patro Eisden	1,071	1,730
13	Seraing	814	2,232
14	Club NXT	554	1,706
15	Jong Genk	505	852
16	RSCA Futures	461	1,333
