= K.S.C. Lokeren =

K.S.C. Lokeren may refer to one of two Belgian football clubs:

- K.S.C. Lokeren Oost-Vlaanderen, the club which dissolved in 2020. Only officially named K.S.C. Lokeren from 1970 until 2000 and still referred to as such despite also having many other similar names during its existence, such as Sporting Lokeren Sint-Niklaas Waasland (2000–2003), and KSC Lokeren Oost-Vlaanderen (2003–2020).
- K.S.C. Lokeren (2025), the club which has used this name since 2025. Initially formed in 2020 out of a merger of the former club and KSV Temse, existing under the name K.S.V. Lokeren-Temse from 2020 until 2025.
