= Gil Van Moerzeke =

Belgian footballer (born 1998)

Personal information
- Date of birth: 28 January 1998 (age 28)
- Place of birth: Sint-Niklaas, Belgium
- Height: 1.90 m (6 ft 3 in)
- Position: Forward

Team information
- Current team: FC Lebbeke
- Number: 22

Youth career
- 2006–2008: SK Grembergen
- 2008–2018: Lokeren

Senior career*
Years	Team	Apps	(Gls)
2018–2020	Lokeren	10	(1)
2020–2025	Lokeren-Temse	112	(43)
2025–	FC Lebbeke	13	(3)
- * Club domestic league appearances and goals as of 13 December 2025

Gil Van Moerzeke (born 28 January 1998) is a Belgian professional footballer who plays as a forward for FC Lebbeke.

== Club career ==
In 2008 Van Moerzeke joined Lokeren as an 8 year old, after two years at SK Grembergen. On 26 January 2018, Van Moerzeke moved signed his first professional contract with Lokeren keeping him with the club until 2020. Van Moerzeke made his professional debut for Lokeren in a 1–1 Belgian First Division A tie with Charleroi on 11 February 2018.
