= Yumeki Yoshinaga =

Japanese footballer (born 2006)

Yumeki Yoshinaga 吉永 夢希
Personal information
- Date of birth: 22 February 2006 (age 20)
- Place of birth: Japan
- Height: 1.77 m (5 ft 10 in)
- Position: Defender

Team information
- Current team: Jong Genk
- Number: 55

Youth career
- FC Vispo
- –2021: Sorriso Kumamoto
- 2022–2024: Kamimura Gakuen High School

Senior career*
Years	Team	Apps	(Gls)
2024–	Jong Genk	27	(2)

International career^{‡}
2023	Japan U17	9	(0)
2024	Japan U18	3	(0)
- * Club domestic league appearances and goals as of 20 April 2026 ‡ National team caps and goals as of 15 October 2024

Yumeki Yoshinaga (吉永 夢希, Yoshinaga Yumeki; born 22 February 2006) is a Japanese professional footballer who plays as a defender for Jong Genk.

== Early life ==
Yoshinaga was born on 22 February 2006 in Japan. A native of Kumamoto Prefecture, Japan, he started playing football while he was in kindergarten.

== Club career ==
After graduating from Kamimura Gakuen High School, in 2024, he signed for Belgian club KRC Genk. Initially, he was sent to their reserve team, Jong Genk, to gain professional experience. On 16 August 2024, he debuted for the club during a 2–0 away win over RFC Seraing in the league.

== Style of play ==
Yoshinaga plays as a defender and is left-footed. Japanese news website Sportsnavi wrote in 2023 that he "is fast... his left foot kicks are also accurate, and he kicks low, high-speed crosses between the goalkeeper and the defender to create goals".
