= Mouhamed Belkheir =

Algerian footballer (born 1999)

Personal information
- Full name: Mouhamed Menaour Belkheir
- Date of birth: 2 January 1999 (age 27)
- Place of birth: Paris, France
- Height: 1.85 m (6 ft 1 in)
- Position: Forward

Team information
- Current team: RAAL La Louvière
- Number: 14

Youth career
- –2016: Hellas Verona
- 2016–2018: Inter Milan
- 2018–2019: Brescia

Senior career*
Years	Team	Apps	(Gls)
2019–2020	Torino	0	(0)
2019–2020	→ Sanjoanense (loan)	15	(9)
2020–2021	Leixões	17	(2)
2021–2023	Vilafranquense	54	(9)
2023–2025	Fortuna Sittard	15	(1)
2024–2025	→ RAAL La Louvière (loan)	26	(14)
2025–	RAAL La Louvière	3	(0)

International career
2018	Algeria U23	1	(0)
- * Club domestic league appearances and goals as of 11 February 2026

Mouhamed Menaour Belkheir (born 2 January 1999) is a professional footballer who plays as a forward for Belgian club RAAL La Louvière. Born in France to Algerian parents, he has represented Algeria at youth international level.

== Career ==
In 2018, Belkheir signed for Brescia Calcio in the Italian second division from Inter Milan, one of Italy's most successful clubs, where he suffered injuries during his last season there.

In 2019, he was sent on loan to A.D. Sanjoanense in the Portuguese third division.

In 2020, Belkheir signed for Leixões in the Portuguese second division.

On 5 July 2023, Belkheir moved to Fortuna Sittard in the Netherlands on a two-year contract. On 8 July 2024, he was loaned to RAAL La Louvière in Belgium, with an option to buy.

== Honours ==
Challenger Pro League

- Runner-up : 2024–25

=== Individual ===
- RAAL La Louvière Player of the Year: 2025
