= Wagane Faye =

Senegalese footballer (born 1993)

Personal information
- Date of birth: 20 November 1993 (age 32)
- Place of birth: Senegal
- Height: 1.80 m (5 ft 11 in)
- Position: Centre-back

Team information
- Current team: RAAL La Louvière
- Number: 4

Senior career*
| Years | Team | Apps | (Gls) |
| –2016 | Génération Foot | | |
| 2016–2022 | Seraing | 125 | (3) |
| 2022– | RAAL La Louvière | 106 | (4) |
- * Club domestic league appearances and goals as of 11 May 2026

Wagane Faye (born 20 November 1993) is a Senegalese professional footballer who plays as a centre-back for Belgian Pro League club RAAL La Louvière.

== Club career ==
In the summer of 2022, Faye moved to the third-tier Belgian club RAAL La Louvière.
