= Noah Makembo-Ntemo =

Belgian association football player (born 2007)

Personal information
- Date of birth: 14 March 2007 (age 19)
- Position: Midfielder

Team information
- Current team: RAAL La Louvière
- Number: 20

Youth career
- –2023: Standard Liege

Senior career*
Years	Team	Apps	(Gls)
2023–2025	SL16 FC	35	(1)
2025–	RAAL La Louvière	2	(0)

International career^{‡}
2022–2023	Belgium U16	4	(0)
2023–2024	Belgium U17	6	(0)
- * Club domestic league appearances and goals as of 11 May 2026 ‡ National team caps and goals as of 23 March 2024

Noah Makembo-Ntemo (born 14 March 2007) is a Belgian professional footballer who plays as a midfielder for Belgian Pro League club RAAL La Louvière. He is a Belgian youth international.

== Club career ==
A product of the Standard Liege academy he signed his first professional contract with the club in May 2023, agreeing to a two-year contract with the option of another season. This came despite a range of scouts from top division sides in Germany and France reportedly showing their interest.

He made his debut for SL16 FC in the Challenger Pro League at the age of 16 years-old during the 2023–24 season. In November 2023, at the age of 16 years and seven months he scored his first professional league goal, away at Francs Borains.

== International career ==
A Belgian youth international, in 2023, he captained the Belgian under-16 team.

== Style of play ==
He is described as an attacking midfielder.

== Personal life ==
He has Congolese heritage.
