= Ahmed Abdullahi (footballer) =

Nigerian footballer (born 2004)

Personal information
- Full name: Ahmed Abdullahi hassan
- Date of birth: 19 June 2004 (age 22)
- Place of birth: Nasarawa State, Nigeria
- Height: 1.80 m (5 ft 11 in)
- Position: Forward

Team information
- Current team: Eyüpspor
- Number: 29

Youth career
- HB Academy Abuja

Senior career*
Years	Team	Apps	(Gls)
2022–2024	Jong Gent	38	(21)
2024	Gent	2	(0)
2024–2026	Sunderland	0	(0)
2026–	Eyüpspor	3	(1)

International career^{‡}
2022–	Nigeria U20	7	(2)
- * Club domestic league appearances and goals as of 30 August 2026 ‡ National team caps and goals as of 16:14, 24 February 2023 (UTC)

Ahmed Abdullahi (born 19 June 2004) is a Nigerian professional footballer who plays as a forward for Süper Lig club Eyüpspor.

== Club career ==
In 2021, Abdullahi went on trial with French side Olympique de Marseille and German side Borussia Dortmund, with Belgian side Gent also showing interest. He went on to sign for the latter, despite interest from a number of other clubs across Europe.

On 30 August 2024, Abdullahi signed a four-year contract with Sunderland.

On 4 August 2026, Abdullahi signed for Turkish Süper Lig club Eyüpspor on a permanent transfer.

== International career ==
Abdullahi was called up to the Nigerian under-20 side for the 2023 Africa U-20 Cup of Nations. He had to forego his salary for a month at club side Gent to play in the tournament, as the Belgian club did not view the under-20 competition as important enough to miss training sessions for. He received a red card in the first game against Senegal; a second yellow for dangerous play.

== Career statistics ==
As of 31 August 2026

Appearances and goals by club, season and competition
Club	Season	League			National cup		League Cup		Other		Total	
Club	Season	Division	Apps	Goals	Apps	Goals	Apps	Goals	Apps	Goals	Apps	Goals
Jong Gent	2022–23	Eerste Nationale	10	0	0	0	—		0	0	10	0
Jong Gent	2023–24	Eerste Nationale	28	21	0	0	—		0	0	28	21
Jong Gent	Total		38	21	0	0	—		0	0	38	21
Gent	2023–24	Belgian Pro League	1	0	0	0	—		0	0	1	0
Gent	2024–25	Belgian Pro League	1	0	0	0	—		0	0	1	0
Gent	Total		2	0	0	0	—		0	0	2	0
Sunderland	2024–25	EFL Championship	0	0	0	0	0	0	—		0	0
Sunderland	2025–26	Premier League	0	0	0	0	0	0	—		0	0
Eyüpspor	2026–27	Süper Lig	3	1	0	0	—		—		3	1
Career total			43	22	0	0	0	0	0	0	43	22
