= Djibril Lamego =

French footballer

Personal information
- Date of birth: 3 August 2003 (age 23)
- Place of birth: Saint-Denis, France
- Height: 1.83 m (6 ft 0 in)
- Position: Centre-back

Team information
- Current team: RAAL La Louvière
- Number: 25

Youth career
- Red Star FC
- FCM Aubervilliers
- 2020–2021: Amiens

Senior career*
Years	Team	Apps	(Gls)
2021–2022	Amiens II	18	(0)
2022–2024	Chantilly	27	(3)
2024–	RAAL La Louvière	59	(0)
- * Club domestic league appearances and goals as of 11 May 2026

Djibril Alain Lamego (born 25 August 2003) is a French professional footballer who plays as a centre-back for the Belgian Pro League club RAAL La Louvière.

== Club career ==
A youth product of Red Star FC and FCM Aubervilliers, Lameogo joined the youth academy of Amiens on 6 March 2020. He was promoted to Amiens' reserves in 2021, and after a lack of opportunities in the first team joined Chantilly in 2021. He helped US Chantilly earn promotion from the Championnat National 3 to Championnat National 2 in his second season. On 28 June 2024, he transferred to the Challenger Pro League club RAAL La Louvière on a contract until 2026. In January 2025, he extended his contract with the club until 2027. He helped RAAL La Louvière come second in his debut league season, and earned promotion to the Belgian Pro League.

== Personal life ==
Born in Paris, Lamego is of Guadeloupean descent.
