= 2024–25 KAA Gent season =

KAA Gent
2024–25 season
- Manager: Wouter Vrancken
- Stadium: Planet Group Arena
- Belgian Pro League: 6th
- Belgian Cup: Eighth round
- UEFA Conference League: Knockout phase play-offs
- Top goalscorer: League: Max Dean (6); All: Max Dean (13)
- Average home league attendance: 13,779
Home colours	Away colours	Third colours
- All statistics correct as of 25 May 2025.

The 2024–25 season was the 125th season in the history of the KAA Gent as a football club, and the 36th consecutive season in Belgian Pro League. In addition to the domestic league, the team participated in the Belgian Cup and the UEFA Conference League.

== Squad ==
Position	Number	Player	Date joined	Further data
GK	1	(France) Paul Nardi	2022	
DF	3	(England) Archie Brown	2023	
DF	4	(Japan) Tsuyoshi Watanabe	2023	
DF	5	(Morocco) Ismaël Kandouss	2023	
DF	12	(France) Hugo Gambor	2024	
DF	20	(Serbia) Stefan Mitrović	2024	
DF	22	(Senegal) Noah Fadiga	2023	
DF	23	(Nigeria) Jordan Torunarigha	2022	
DF	41	(Belgium) Hannes Vernemmen		
MF	6	(Israel) Omri Gandelman	2023	
MF	7	(South Korea) Hong Hyun-seok	2022	
MF	8	(Belgium) Pieter Gerkens	2023	
MF	13	(Belgium) Julien De Sart	2021	
MF	17	(Denmark) Andrew Hjulsager	2021	
MF	18	(Belgium) Matisse Samoise	2008	
MF	24	(Belgium) Sven Kums	2019	
FW	9	(Belgium) Momodou Sonko	2024	
FW	28	(Belgium) Matias Fernandez-Pardo	2020	
FW		(Nigeria) Ahmed Abdullahi	2022	
FW		(Iceland) Andri Guðjohnsen	2024	

== Transfers ==
=== In ===
Pos.	Player	Transferred from	Fee	Date	Source
FW	(Iceland) Andri Guðjohnsen	(Denmark) Lyngby		1 July 2024	
FW	(England) Max Dean	(England) Milton Keynes Dons	Undisclosed	12 July 2024	
MF	(Belgium) Mathias Delorge	(Belgium) Sint-Truiden	€3,500,000	24 July 2024	

=== Out ===
Pos.	Player	Transferred to	Fee	Date	Source
FW	(Belgium) Laurent Depoitre		End of contract	1 July 2024	
FW	(Morocco) Tarik Tissoudali	(Greece) PAOK	Undisclosed	28 July 2024	
FW	(Belgium) Matias Fernandez-Pardo	(France) Lille		30 August 2024	

== Friendlies ==
=== Pre-season ===
29 June 2024 Friendly	KFC Merelbeke (Belgium)	0–5	(Belgium) Gent	Merelbeke
19:00		Report	Fernandez-Pardo 27', 37'; Abdullahi 74'; Gandelman 78'; Samoise 80'

5 July 2024 Friendly	HO Kalken (Belgium)	0–9	(Belgium) Gent	Kalken
19:00		Report	Sonko 16'; Gandelman 24'; Fortuna 28'; Yokota 36'; Surdez 55', 90'; Abdullahi 59'; Gerkens 66'; Asselman 70'	Attendance: 1,000

6 July 2024 Friendly	Gent (Belgium)	v	(Belgium) Deinze

10 July 2024 Friendly	AEK Athens (Greece)	2–1	(Belgium) Gent	Netherlands
15:00	Zini 2'; Rota 54'		Hong Hyun-seok 18'
Note: 2 x 35 minutes

10 July 2024 Friendly	AEK Athens (Greece)	0–1	(Belgium) Gent	Netherlands
16:30			Yokota 27'
Note: 2 x 30 minutes

13 July 2024 Friendly	Gent (Belgium)	v	(Netherlands) Go Ahead Eagles	Netherlands

13 July 2024 Friendly	Westerlo (Belgium)	1–0	(Belgium) Gent
10:30	Bos 33'
Note: Behind closed doors.

17 July 2024 Friendly	Gent (Belgium)	0–1	(France) Lille	Ghent
19:30			Cabella 7'	Stadium: Planet Group Arena

20 July 2024 Friendly	Zulte Waregem (Belgium)	2–0	(Belgium) Gent
14:00	Nyssen 12'; Erenbjerg 52'

== Competitions ==
=== Overall record ===
Competition	First match	Last match	Starting round	Record							
Competition	First match	Last match	Starting round	Pld	W	D	L	GF	GA	GD	Win %
Belgian Pro League	28 July 2024		Matchday 1	40	12	12	16	45	65	−20	30.00
Belgian Cup				2	1	0	1	7	2	+5	50.00
UEFA Conference League	25 July 2024		Second qualifying round	12	7	1	4	21	16	+5	58.33
Total				54	20	13	21	73	83	−10	37.04

Last updated: 24 October 2024
Source: Competitions

=== Belgian Pro League ===
==== Regular season ====
Pos	Team	Pld	W	D	L	GF	GA	GD	Pts	Qualification or relegation
4	Anderlecht	30	15	6	9	50	27	+23	51	Qualification for the Champions' play-offs
5	Antwerp	30	12	10	8	47	32	+15	46	Qualification for the Champions' play-offs
6	Gent	30	11	12	7	41	33	+8	45	Qualification for the Champions' play-offs
7	Standard Liège	30	10	9	11	22	35	−13	39	Qualification for the Europe play-offs
8	Mechelen	30	10	8	12	45	40	+5	38	Qualification for the Europe play-offs

Source: Jupiler Pro League (in Dutch), Soccerway
Rules for classification: 1) Points; 2) Matches won; 3) Goal difference; 4) Goals scored; 5) Away matches won; 6) Away goal difference; 7) Away goals scored; 8) Play-off.

==== Results by round ====
Round	1	2	3	4	5	6	7	8	9	10	11	12	13	14	15	16	17	18	19	20	21	22	23	24
Ground	A	H	A	H	A	H	H	A	H	A	A	H	A	H	A	A	H	H	A	H	A	H	A	H
Result	W	L	L	W	L	D	W	W	W	D	D	L	D	W	L	D	W	D	W	L	D	D		
Position	2	8	11	7	12	12	9	3	3	3	3	5	6	5	6	7	5	6	5	6	6	6		

Updated to match(es) played on 17 January 2025. Source:
A = Away; H = Home; W = Win; D = Draw; L = Loss

==== Matches ====
The match schedule was released on 11 June 2024.

28 July 2024 1	Kortrijk	0–1	Gent	Kortrijk
16:00			Guðjohnsen 59'	Stadium: Guldensporen Stadion

4 August 2024 2	Gent	1–2	Dender	Ghent
	Yokota 47'		Soladio 23'; Berte 86'	Stadium: Planet Group Arena; Attendance: 12,072; Referee: Jan Boterberg

11 August 2024 3	Charleroi	1–0	Gent	Charleroi
18:30	Heymans 90'			Stadium: Stade du Pays de Charleroi; Referee: Lothar D'Hondt

18 August 2024 4	Gent	4–1	Westerlo	Ghent
				Stadium: Planet Group Arena

1 September 2024 6	Gent	1–1	Antwerp	Ghent
				Stadium: Planet Group Arena

15 September 2024 7	Gent	2–0	Mechelen	Ghent
				Stadium: Planet Group Arena

22 September 2024 8	Club Brugge	2–4	Gent	Bruges
				Stadium: Jan Breydel Stadium

26 September 2024 5	Cercle Brugge	2–1	Gent	Bruges
				Stadium: Jan Breydel Stadium

29 September 2024 9	Gent	3–0	OH Leuven	Ghent
				Stadium: Planet Group Arena

6 October 2024 10	Sint-Truiden	1–1	Gent	Sint-Truiden
				Stadium: Stayen

19 October 2024 11	Union Saint-Gilloise	0–0	Gent	Forest
				Stadium: Joseph Marien Stadium

27 October 2024 12	Gent	0–2	Genk	Ghent
18:30 UTC+1	Samoise (yellow card) 37'; Delorge (yellow card) 85'	Report	Arokodare 46' (yellow card) 76'; Steuckers 58' (pen.); Hrošovský (yellow card) 69'	Stadium: Planet Group Arena; Attendance: 17,020; Referee: (Belgium) Nicolas Laforge

3 November 2024 13	Beerschot	0–0	Gent	Antwerp
19:15 CET	Colassin (yellow card) 36'; Faisal Al-Ghamdi (yellow card) 86'; Omar Fayed (yellow card) 89'	Report	Guðjohnsen (yellow card) 28'; Hélio Varela (yellow card) 90+1'	Stadium: Olympisch Stadion; Attendance: 4,954; Referee: (Belgium) Michael Allaerts

10 November 2024 14	Gent	5–0	Standard Liège	Ghent
16:00 CET	Watanabe 5'; Dean 41' 59'; Brown 51'; Gilles De Meyer 89'	Report	Alexandropoulos (yellow card) 11'	Stadium: Planet Group Arena; Attendance: 16,283; Referee: (Belgium) Lawrence Visser

24 November 2024 15	Anderlecht	6–0	Gent	Brussels
18:30 CET	Rits 23'; Edozie 38'; Dolberg 45+1' 77'; Tiago Araújo 85' (o.g.); Amuzu 88'	Report	Torunarigha (yellow card) 9' (yellow-red card) 43'; Watanabe (yellow card) 43'; Samoise (yellow card) 68' (red card) 75'	Stadium: Lotto Park; Attendance: 21,900; Referee: (Belgium) Lothar D'Hondt

8 February 2025 25	Mechelen	3–3	Gent

16 February 2025 26	Gent	3–2	Beerschot

23 February 2025 27	Genk	0–0	Gent

1 March 2025 28	Gent	1–1	Club Brugge

9 March 2025 29	Antwerp	0–1	Gent

16 March 2025 30	Gent	1–2	Kortrijk

=== Belgian Cup ===
30 October 2024 Seventh round	Gent	7–0	Rochefort	Ghent
20:00 CET	Gerkens 6'; Sonko 18', 56'; Varela 31', 79'; Dean 75' (pen.), 87'			Stadium: Ghelamco Arena

4 December 2024 Eighth round	Union SG	3–2	Gent	Forest
20:00 CET	David 14', 59'; Fuseini 49'	Report	Dean 44'; Gandelman 63'	Stadium: Joseph Marien Stadium

=== UEFA Conference League ===
==== Second qualifying round ====
The draw was held on 19 June 2024.

25 July 2024 First leg	Gent (Belgium)	4–1	(Faroe Islands) Víkingur	Ghent
20:00 UTC+2	Hong Hyun-seok 24', 88'; Kums 59'; De Sart 68' (pen.)		Nielsen 13'	Stadium: Planet Group Arena

1 August 2024 Second leg	Víkingur (Faroe Islands)	0–3 (1–7 agg.)	(Belgium) Gent	Faroe Islands
18:45 UTC+1

==== Third qualifying round ====
8 August 2024 First leg	Silkeborg IF (Denmark)	2–2	(Belgium) Gent	Silkeborg, Denmark
18:30	Adamsen 49' (pen.), 90+5'		Ganchas 61' (o.g.); Dean 90+3'	Stadium: JYSK Park; Attendance: 3,712; Referee: Henrik Nalbandyan (Armenia)

15 August 2024 Second leg	Gent (Belgium)	3–2 (5–4 agg.)	(Denmark) Silkeborg IF	Ghent
20:30				Stadium: Planet Group Arena

==== League phase ====
Pos	Team	Pld	W	D	L	GF	GA	GD	Pts	Qualification
15	(Spain) Real Betis	6	3	1	2	6	5	+1	10	Advance to knockout phase play-offs (seeded)
16	(Germany) 1. FC Heidenheim	6	3	1	2	7	7	0	10	Advance to knockout phase play-offs (seeded)
17	(Belgium) Gent	6	3	0	3	8	8	0	9	Advance to knockout phase play-offs (unseeded)
18	(Denmark) Copenhagen	6	2	2	2	8	9	−1	8	Advance to knockout phase play-offs (unseeded)
19	(Iceland) Víkingur Reykjavík	6	2	2	2	7	8	−1	8	Advance to knockout phase play-offs (unseeded)

Source: UEFA
Rules for classification: League phase tiebreakers

3 October 2024 1	Chelsea (England)	4–2	(Belgium) Gent	London, England
20:00 UTC+1	Veiga 12'; Neto 46'; Nkunku 63'; Dewsbury-Hall 70'	Report	Watanabe 50'; Gandelman 90'	Stadium: Stamford Bridge; Attendance: 38,546; Referee: Daniel Schlager (Germany)

24 October 2024 2	Gent (Belgium)	2–1	(Norway) Molde	Ghent
18:45 UTC+2	Fadiga 24'; Brown 90+5'	Report	Møller Dæhli 78'	Stadium: Planet Group Arena; Referee: Goga Kikacheishvili (Georgia)

7 November 2024 3	Gent (Belgium)	1–0	(Cyprus) Omonia	Ghent
18:45	Gandelman 31'; Dean (yellow card) 90+4'	Report	Kakoullis (yellow card) 84'	Stadium: Planet Group Arena; Attendance: 8,584; Referee: (Hungary) Tamás Bognár

28 November 2024 4	Lugano (Switzerland)	2–0	(Belgium) Gent	Thun
21:00 CET	Mahou 6' (yellow card) 71'; Valenzuela (yellow card) 59'; Saipi (yellow card) 69'; Bislimi (yellow card) 73'; Doumbia 86'	Report	Guðjohnsen (yellow card) 31'; Torunarigha (yellow card) 49'; Watanabe (yellow card) 76'; Dean (yellow card) 80'	Stadium: Stockhorn Arena; Attendance: 2,672; Referee: (Albania) Enea Jorgji

12 December 2024 5	Gent (Belgium)	3–0	(Serbia) TSC	Planet Group Arena, Ghent
21:00	Dean 8' (pen.); Gandelman 13'; Surdez 20'	Report		Attendance: 5,423; Referee: Ashot Ghaltakhchyan (Armenia)

19 December 2024 6	Larne (Northern Ireland)	1–0	(Belgium) Gent	Windsor Park, Belfast
21:00 (20:00 UTC+0)	Cosgrove 74'	Report		Attendance: 2,393; Referee: Sigurd Kringstad (Norway)

==== Knockout phase ====
===== Knockout phase play-offs =====
The draw for the knockout phase play-offs was held on 20 December 2024.

13 February 2025 First leg	Gent (Belgium)	0–3	(Spain) Real Betis	Planet Group Arena, Ghent
21:00		Report	Antony 47'; Bakambu 72'; Altimira 84'	Attendance: 11,051; Referee: Horațiu Feșnic (Romania)

20 February 2025 First leg	Real Betis (Spain)	0–1 (3–1 agg.)	(Belgium) Gent	Benito Villamarín, Seville
18:45		Report	Brown 87'	Attendance: 51,510; Referee: Damian Sylwestrzak (Poland)
