= Alfred Caicedo =

Spanish footballer

Personal information
- Full name: Afred Lenin Caicedo Mina
- Date of birth: 10 September 2004 (age 22)
- Place of birth: Esmeraldas, Ecuador
- Height: 1.79 m (5 ft 10 in)
- Position: Left-back

Team information
- Current team: Vizela
- Number: 33

Youth career
- Clan Juvenil
- 2019: Norte América
- 2020–2022: Aucas

Senior career*
Years	Team	Apps	(Gls)
2021–2022	Aucas	11	(0)
2023–2026	Jong Genk	43	(0)
2025–2026	→ Cádiz (loan)	14	(0)
2026–	Vizela	1	(0)

International career
2022	Ecuador U20	3	(0)
- * Club domestic league appearances and goals as of 14 September 2026

Alfred Lenin Caicedo Mina (born 10 September 2004) is an Ecuadorian footballer who plays as a left-back for Liga Portugal 2 club Vizela.

== Club career ==
Born in Esmeraldas, Caicedo played for Clan Juvenil and Norte América before joining Aucas in 2020. He made his first team – and Ecuadorian Serie A – debut on 17 April 2021, coming on as a second-half substitute in a 3–1 home loss to Olmedo.

After 11 first team matches in 2021, Caicedo returned to the under-20 side of Aucas in the following year, before joining Belgian side Genk on 4 January 2023. He immediately became a member of Jong Genk, the reserve team, in the Challenger Pro League.

On 5 July 2025, Caicedo was loaned to Spanish Segunda División side Cádiz for the season.

== International career ==
In June 2022, Caicedo was called up to the Ecuador national under-20 team.
