= Franck Surdez =

Swiss footballer

Personal information
- Full name: Franck William Surdez
- Date of birth: 5 May 2002 (age 24)
- Place of birth: Neuchâtel, Switzerland
- Height: 1.88 m (6 ft 2 in)
- Position: Winger

Team information
- Current team: Sion
- Number: 19

Youth career
- 2011–2020: Neuchâtel Xamax

Senior career*
Years	Team	Apps	(Gls)
2020–2024	Neuchâtel Xamax	54	(11)
2024–2026	Gent	46	(3)
2026–	Sion	24	(3)

International career
2022	Switzerland U20	1	(1)
2023–2024	Switzerland U21	10	(2)
- * Club domestic league appearances and goals as of 28 September 2026

Franck William Surdez (born 5 May 2002) is a Swiss professional footballer who plays as a winger for FC Sion in the Swiss Super League.

== Club career ==
Surdez is a youth product of Neuchâtel Xamax, having joined their academy in 2011 and worked his way up their youth categories. He debuted with the Neuchâtel Xamax senior team in the Swiss Challenge League in 2020, and on 16 March 2021 signed his first professional contract with the club until 2023 with an option to extend for one season. On 15 February 2023, he extended his contract until 2025. In January 2024, he was nominated as one of the players of the season for the Swiss Challenge League.

On 25 January 2024, he transferred to the Belgian club Gent on a contract until 2027.

After two years in Belgium, he returned to Switzerland on 16 January 2026, joining FC Sion on a permanent basis. He signs a contract until summer 2030.

== International career ==
Surdez was born in Switzerland to a Swiss father and Cameroonian mother. He is a youth international for Switzerland, having played for the Switzerland 21s in 2023.

== Career statistics ==
As of 16 January 2026

Appearances and goals by club, season and competition
Club	Season	League			National cup (Note: Includes Swiss Cup, Belgian Cup)		Europe		Other		Total	
Club	Season	Division	Apps	Goals	Apps	Goals	Apps	Goals	Apps	Goals	Apps	Goals
Neuchâtel Xamax	2020–21	Swiss Challenge League	6	0	1	0	—		—		7	0
Neuchâtel Xamax	2021–22	Swiss Challenge League	24	4	2	0	—		—		26	4
Neuchâtel Xamax	2022–23	Swiss Challenge League	7	0	0	0	—		2 (Note: Appearances in relegation play-off)	0	9	0
Neuchâtel Xamax	2023–24	Swiss Challenge League	17	7	2	2	—		—		19	9
Neuchâtel Xamax	Total		54	11	5	2	—		2	0	61	13
Gent	2023–24	Belgian Pro League	3	0	0	0	—		6 (Note: Appearances in play-off)	0	9	0
Gent	2024–25	Belgian Pro League	29	2	1	0	11 (Note: Appearances in UEFA Conference League)	1	—		41	3
Gent	2025–26	Belgian Pro League	14	1	2	0	0	0	—		16	1
Gent	Total		46	3	3	0	11	1	6	0	66	4
Sion	2025–26	Swiss Super League	0	0	0	0	—		—		0	0
Career total			100	14	8	2	11	1	8	0	127	17
