= RAAL La Louvière =

Belgian football club

- Full name: Royal Association Athlétique Louviéroise La Louvière
- Founded: 1919; 107 years ago as Cercle Sportif Couillet; 2009; 17 years ago as Football Couillet-La Louviére; 2011; 15 years ago as FC Charleroi; 2014; 12 years ago Racing Charleroi-Couillet-Fleurus; 2017; 9 years ago RAAL La Louviére
- Ground: Easi Arena
- Capacity: 8,050
- Chairman: Salvatore Curaba
- Head coach: Sven Vandenbroeck
- League: Belgian Pro League
- 2025–26: Belgian Pro League, 15th of 16
Home colours	Away colours

Royal Association Athlétique Louviéroise La Louvière (known by its abbreviation RAAL La Louvière) is a Belgian professional football club based in La Louvière, in the province of Hainaut. The club was founded in 2009. It competes in the Belgian Pro League, the top tier of Belgian football, after being promoted from the Challenger Pro League in 2025.

== History ==
=== Early history ===
Cercle Sportif Couillet was founded in 1919 and joined the Royal Belgian Football Association (KBVB) in 1920. In 1934 the club had risen to the national divisions for the first time. After that, the club spent the next decades in the lower-tier Belgian Provincial Leagues.

In 1945 the club officially changed its name to Amicale Cercle Sportif Couillet. A few years later, in 1949, another club was founded in Couillet, Union Sportive Couillet d'Amérique. After a few years in a competing amateur association, they moved to the KBVB in 1952 as a debuting club, under matricule number 5580. In 1956, they effectively became member.

In 1962, Amicale Cercle Sportif Couillet received the royal title and changed its name to Royale Amicale Cercle Sportif Couillet (RACS Couillet). In 1977, both clubs from Couillet eventually merged. The new club was named Royale Association Cercle Sportif Couillet (also abbreviated as RACS Couillet), and continued to play under matricule number 94 of Amicale Cercle Sportif.

At the beginning of the 2000s, the club successfully worked its way up from the Belgian Provincial Leagues. After all, in 2000 RACS Couillet had climbed back up to the national Belgian Fourth Division and in 2005 they even forced promotion to the Belgian Third Division. However, in the 2007–08 season, the club finished last in the table and relegated back to the Fourth Division.

=== Football Couillet-La Louvière (2009–2011) ===
In 2009, it was decided to collaborate with third-division team RAA Louviéroise, a former top-tier team that was experiencing financial difficulties. It did not come to an official merger, but the name RAA Louviéroise was dropped and the club name of RACS Couillet was changed to Football Couillet-La Louvière, which continued to play in the Fourth Division with Couillet's matricule number 94, with the traditional matricule number of RAA Louviéroise, number 93, being lost. The first team played in the stadium of RAA Louviéroise, the Stade du Tivoli in La Louvière. Several youth teams continued to play in the Stade du Fiestaux and other areas in Couillet. In the club logo, the wolf was taken from the RAA Louviéroise logo, and the club's nickname became "Les Loups" ("the wolves"). The green and white club colors were retained.

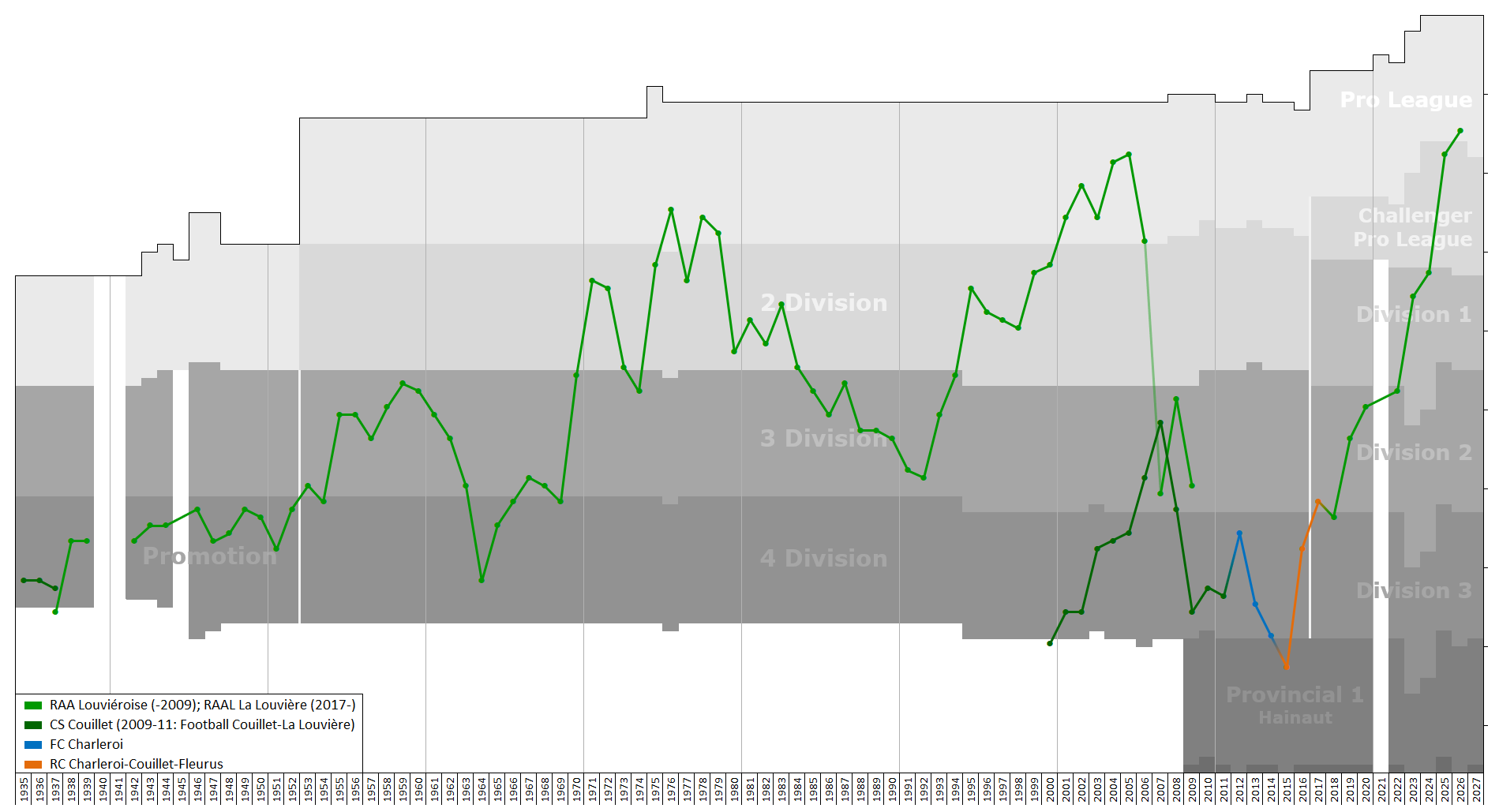
Historical league performance chart of RAAL La Louvière and its predecessors

=== FC Charleroi (2011–2014) ===
In the spring of 2011, the football landscape in La Louvière and Charleroi changed again. Football club URS du Center, affiliated with the Royal Belgian Football Association (KBVB) with matricle number 213, started playing in the Stade du Tivoli under the new name UR La Louvière Centre. The recently relocated Football Couillet-La Louvière returned to Charleroi and the name became Football Club Charleroi (FC Charleroi). There was also cooperation with provincial club RFCS Marcinelle, affiliated with the KBVB with matricule number 301, although this did not immediately lead to a merger. In the course of the 2011–12 season, the club's identity was changed further. Blue and white colors were chosen and a logo with a lion was introduced.

In 2013, the board took over football club RJS Heppignies-Lambusart-Fleurus, who were experiencing financial difficulties. This club was affiliated with the KBVB through matricule number 5192 and competed in the Belgian Third Division. The first team of FC Charleroi was transferred to that club from next season, which was renamed Charleroi Fleurus. They started playing in the Third Division in Charleroi and the club colors and the logo of FC Charleroi were also adopted. Under the matricule number 94, an "empty" club would remain and the matricule number was "for sale". Because chairman Roberto Leone had not yet found a suitable investor, a team for the Belgian Fourth Division and a youth team were registered for the 2013–14 season. On the second matchday, the club suffered a staggering 12–0 loss to Sint-Eloois-Winkel Sport. FC Charleroi ended the season in the Belgian Fourth Division with a 16–0 loss against OMS Ingelmunster. They finished the season with only five points and conceded 144 goals. FC Charleroi thus relegated to the Belgian Provincial Leagues.

=== Racing Charleroi-Couillet-Fleurus (2014–2017) ===
After the season there was a major change of matricule numbers between a number of Walloon clubs. The Liège Provincial League club RFC Sérésien (matricule number 23) was acquired by the French Ligue 2 club FC Metz. They wanted to enter the Belgian Second Division as soon as possible, and because this would take at least three seasons via the sporting route, they were looking for a matricule number to take a shortcut to the higher divisions. They found this in Hainaut Province at Second Division club Boussu Dour Borinage (matricule number 167), who were having financial difficulties. Boussu Dour wanted to leave their matricule number on the condition that they could take over another matricule number in the national series and keep their national youth license. Boussu Dour found an agreement with Roberto Leone, president of relegating fourth division FC Charleroi (matricule number 94) and relegating Third Division team Charleroi-Fleurus (matricule number 5192, and in possession of a national youth license). Boussu Dour would take over the matricule number 5192 and continue playing as Francs Borains in the Fourth Division. Matricule number 167 was taken over by Seraing United.

Due to the departure of matricule number 5192, they fell back to the remaining matricule number 94 to develop a club in the region around Charleroi. Administratively, a merger was entered into with the redundant matricule number 23 of RFC Sérésien, which thus brought its national license for youth work into the merger. The fusion club was called RC Charleroi-Couillet-Fleurus (RCCF) and continued to play with matricule number 94. Due to the relegation of FC Charleroi, RCCF started in 2014–15 in the Provincial League of Hainaut.

After one season, the club played in Belgian Fourth Division again and was able to force promotion to the Third Division via the final round, which then became Belgian Second Amateur Division for the 2016–17 season. The club, however, only outdid UR Namur in the league table, and relegated after one season.

=== RAAL La Louvière (2017–present) ===
Meanwhile, after the disintegration of the historic RAA La Louvière into lower-tier clubs in Charleroi, URS Center became La Louvière's primary club and took the name UR La Louvière Centre. Yet, not everyone thought that this club was really the replacement for RAAL. Under the initiative of former footballer Salvatore Curaba, the matricule number of Racing Charleroi Couillet Fleurus was taken over and the name was changed to RAAL La Louvière, with the club returning to the city of La Louvière. In the 2017–18 season, the club started competing in the fifth-tier Belgian Third Amateur Division, where the club immediately won the title in its inaugural season.

In the 2023–24 season, RAAL La Louvière secured promotion to the second-tier Challenger Pro League for the first time in history as champions of Belgian National Division 1 after obtaining a license from professional league.

On 18 April 2025, RAAL La Louvière secured promotion to the top-tier Belgian Pro League for the first time in history from next season as runner-up of Challenger Pro League after defeat Lommel 1–2 with own goal Yeboah Amankwah in 79th minute and Mouhamed Belkheir in 92nd minute and ended one-year stint in second tier.

== Stadium ==
RAAL La Louvière moved to their new stadium in the 2025-2026 season, after playing in Stade du Tivoli until 2025.

== Current squad ==
As of 15 September 2026. Note: Flags indicate national team as defined under FIFA eligibility rules; some limited exceptions apply. Players may hold more than one non-FIFA nationality.

No.	Pos.	Nation	Player
3	DF	FRA	Nolan Gillot
4	DF	SEN	Wagane Faye
5	DF	BEL	Thierry Lutonda
7	MF	HUN	Mátyás Kovács
9	FW	FRA	Elias Filet
10	MF	SEN	Mame Wade
11	FW	NGR	Mustapha Isah
14	FW	ALG	Mouhamed Belkheir
16	GK	LUX	Tiago Pereira Cardoso (on loan from Borussia Mönchengladbach)
18	DF	FRA	Shaquil Delos
19	MF	BEL	Timéo Kerckhofs
20	MF	BEL	Noah Makembo-Ntemo
21	GK	ARG	Marcos Peano (captain)
22	DF	FRA	Siad Gourville

No.	Pos.	Nation	Player
23	MF	BEL	Joël Ito
25	DF	FRA	Djibril Lamego
28	MF	FRA	Bryan Soumaré
29	MF	FRA	Marius Courcoul (on loan from Angers)
30	FW	HUN	Zsombor Gruber
33	DF	GER	Patrick Nkoa
43	MF	BEL	Quentin Benaets
44	DF	MAR	Mehdi Boukamir (on loan from Charleroi)
48	MF	MLI	Ismaila Coulibaly
71	GK	POR	Lucas Monteiro
78	MF	MAR	Anas Tajaouart (on loan from Anderlecht)
90	FW	BEL	Léandro Rousseau
91	GK	BEL	Théo Radelet
99	DF	FRA	Yllan Okou

== Coaching staff ==
Position	Name
Head coach	(Belgium) Sven Vandenbroeck
Assistant coach	(Senegal) Ibrahima Sonko
First-Team Coach	(France) Clément Tainmont (Belgium) Antoine Turi
Goalkeeping Coach	(Belgium) Emmanuel Miraglia
Fitness Coach	(Argentina) Pablo Morchon
Scout Trainer	(Belgium) Enzo Scifo
Sporting Director	(Belgium) David Verwilghen
Technical Director	(Argentina) Nicolás Frutos
Scout	(France) Issam Rahmani
Medical Director Physiotherapy	(Belgium) Fabian Gabellini
Head of methodology	(Belgium) Loris Viroux
Goalkeeping Co-ordinator	(Belgium) Silvio Proto

== Honours ==
- Belgian National Division 1
  - Winner (1): 2023–24
- Challenger Pro League
  - Runner-up (1): 2024–25
