= Omri Gandelman =

Israeli footballer (born 2000)

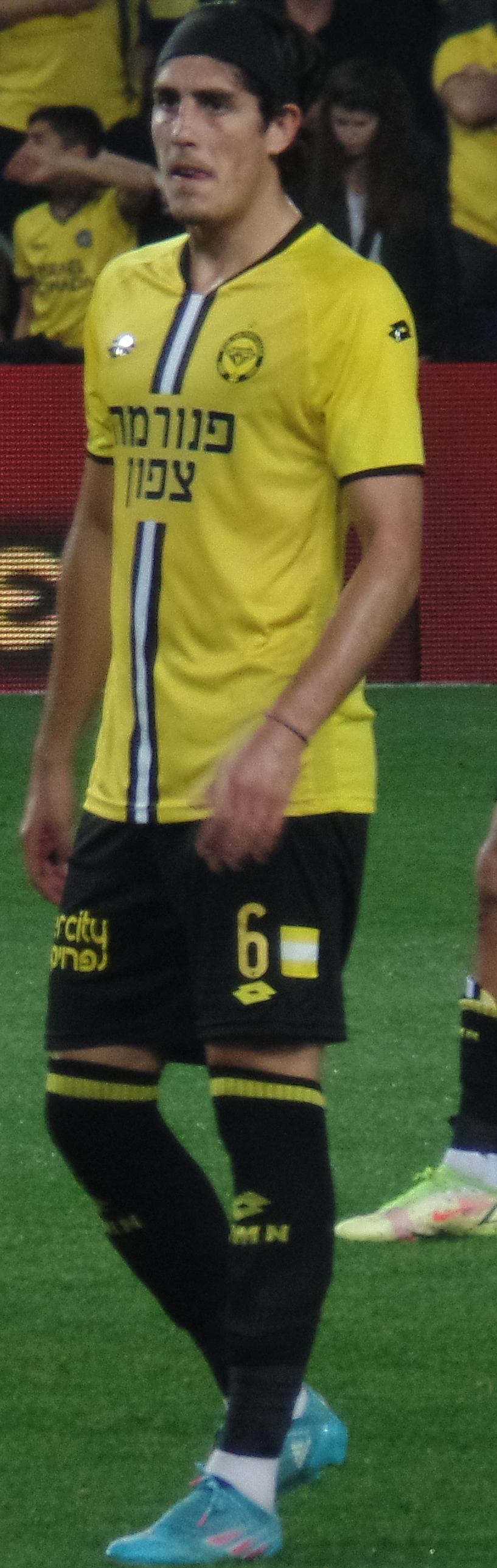
- Gandelman playing for Maccabi Netanya in 2022

Personal information
- Date of birth: 16 May 2000 (age 26)
- Place of birth: Hod HaSharon, Israel
- Height: 1.88 m (6 ft 2 in)
- Position: Midfielder

Team information
- Current team: Lecce
- Number: 16

Youth career
- 2008–2011: Hapoel Hod HaSharon
- 2011–2014: Maccabi Petah Tikva
- 2014–2017: Hapoel Ra'anana
- 2017–2018: Maccabi Petah Tikva
- 2018: Wehen Wiesbaden
- 2018–2020: Maccabi Netanya

Senior career*
| Years | Team | Apps | (Gls) |
| 2020–2023 | Maccabi Netanya | 100 | (10) |
| 2023–2026 | Gent | 83 | (23) |
| 2026– | Lecce | 19 | (2) |

International career^{‡}
| 2021–2023 | Israel U21 | 14 | (4) |
| 2024 | Israel Olympic | 3 | (1) |
| 2021– | Israel | 6 | (2) |
- * Club domestic league appearances and goals as of 25 May 2026 ‡ National team caps and goals as of 26 March 2026

Omri Gandelman (Hebrew: עמרי גנדלמן also spelled עומרי גאנדלמן; born 16 May 2000) is an Israeli professional footballer who plays as a midfielder for Serie A club Lecce and the Israel national team.

== Early life ==
Gandelman was born and raised in Hod HaSharon, Israel, to an Israeli family of Ashkenazi Jewish descent and of Sephardi Jewish descent. His father is Israeli former basketball player Shmuel "Shmulik" Gandelman, and grandson of Rami Gandelman who was a basketball manager and a sports personality in Jerusalem.

He also holds a Portuguese passport, on account of his Sephardi Jewish ancestors, which eases the move to certain European football leagues.

== Club career ==
Gandelman is a youth product of the academies of the Israeli clubs Hapoel Hod HaSharon, Maccabi Petah Tikva and Hapoel Ra'anana. In 2018, he was scouted by the German academy of Wehen Wiesbaden and had a stint there, before returning to his native Israel for its mandatory military service.

=== Maccabi Netanya ===
Gandelman made his professional senior debut with Maccabi Netanya in a 3–1 Israeli Premier League victory over Hapoel Ironi Kiryat Shmona on 2 June 2020.

=== Gent ===
In October 2023, Gandelman signed a four-year contract with Belgian Pro League club Gent for a reported fee of €2.35 million. He spent two-and-a-half seasons at the club, scoring 33 goals in 108 appearances.

=== Lecce ===
On 9 January 2026, Gandelman moved to Italy, joining Serie A club Lecce on a contract until June 2029, with an option for a further year.

== International career ==
Gandelman played for the Israel U21 side from 2021 to 2023.

Coming on as a substitute within the first half, Gandelman debuted with the seniors' Israel national team in a 4–2 2022 FIFA World Cup qualification away loss against Austria on 12 November 2021. Gandelman scored his first international goal for Israel in their UEFA Nations League match against France on 10 October 2024.

=== 2024 Summer Olympics ===
Gandelman has been selected for the Israel U23's squad, ahead of the men's football tournament at the 2024 Summer Olympics in Paris.

He has played for the Israel U23 the whole three Olympic matches, as they were knocked out after the group-stage ended. Gandelman scored a goal against Paraguay U23 to make it a 1–1 tie, which was eventually lost.

== Personal life ==
As of late 2023, Gandelman resides in Gent, Belgium, along with his Israeli girlfriend Meital.

== Career statistics ==
=== Club ===
As of match played 16 February 2026

Appearances and goals by club, season and competition
| Club | Season | League | | | Belgian Cup | | Europe | | Total | |
| Club | Season | Division | Apps | Goals | Apps | Goals | Apps | Goals | Apps | Goals |
|---|---|---|---|---|---|---|---|---|---|---|
| Gent | 2023–24 | Belgian Pro League | 33 | 11 | 2 | 0 | 10 (Note: Appearances in UEFA Conference League) | 2 | 45 | 13 |
| Gent | 2024–25 | Belgian Pro League | 32 | 5 | 1 | 1 | 10 | 6 | 43 | 12 |
| Gent | 2025–26 | Belgian Pro League | 18 | 7 | 2 | 1 | — | | 20 | 8 |
| Gent | Total | | 83 | 23 | 5 | 2 | 20 | 8 | 108 | 33 |
| Lecce | 2025–26 | Serie A | 7 | 2 | 0 | 0 | — | | 7 | 2 |
| Career total | | | 90 | 25 | 5 | 2 | 20 | 8 | 115 | 35 |

=== International ===
As of match played 10 June 2025

Appearances and goals by national team and year
| National team | Year | Apps | Goals |
|---|---|---|---|
| Israel | 2021 | 1 | 0 |
| Israel | 2024 | 3 | 1 |
| Israel | 2025 | 1 | 0 |
| Total | | 5 | 1 |

Scores and results list Israel's goal tally first, score column indicates score after each Gandelman’s goal

List of international goals scored by Omri Gandelman
| No. | Date | Venue | Opponent | Score | Result | Competition |
|---|---|---|---|---|---|---|
| 1 | 10 October 2024 | Bozsik Aréna, Budapest, Hungary | France | 1–1 | 1-4 | 2024–25 UEFA Nations League A |

== Honours ==
Maccabi Netanya

- Israel Toto Cup (Ligat Ha'Al): 2022–23

== See also ==
- List of Jewish footballers
- List of Jews in sports
- List of Israelis
- List of Israel international footballers
