= 2023–24 Belgian National Division 1 =

Belgian National Division 1
- Season: 2023–24
- Dates: 30 August 2023 – 12 May 2024
- Champions: La Louvière
- Promoted: La Louvière; Lokeren-Temse
- Relegated: Sint-Eloois-Winkel; Visé
- Matches: 306
- Goals: 887 (2.9 per match)
- Top goalscorer: Ahmed Abdullahi (21 goals)

The 2023–24 Belgian National Division 1 was the eighth season of the third-tier football league. The league began on 30 August 2023 and ended on 12 May 2024. This was the final season in the league's current format and from the following season, it split into a Flemish (VV) and Francophone (ACFF) division.

== Team changes ==
=== Out ===
Six teams moved to another level:

- Patro Eisden Maasmechelen was promoted as champions of the previous season.
- RFC Liège and Francs Borains took up the two remaining promotion spots and moved up to the 2023–24 Challenger Pro League as well.
- Ninove, Rupel Boom and Mandel United were relegated after finishing in the bottom three positions. Ninove dropped voluntarily and would have been relegated in any case, irrespective of their position.

=== In ===
Four teams entered the division, three teams were promoted from the 2022–23 Belgian Division 2:

- Lokeren-Temse, winners of the Belgian Division 2 VV A.
- Cappellen, winners of the Belgian Division 2 VV B.
- Union Namur, runner-up of the Belgian Division 2 ACFF as champions Warnant did not apply for a licence.

finally,

- Virton were relegated from the 2022–23 Challenger Pro League.

== Format changes ==
The league was reduced from 20 to 18 teams, resulting in a regular season of 34 matches. For this season only, no playoffs will be organized, as the league will split into a Flemish (VV) and Francophone (ACFF) division, with 16 and 12 teams respectively. As a result, at the end of the season:

- the top two teams will be promoted (assuming they have obtained a valid license)
- the lowest finishing team from VV side will be relegated in case they finish in 16th or lower. If the lowest finishing team from VV side finishes higher than 16th, it will take part in a playoff with a (VV) team from the 2023–24 Belgian Division 2, unless the two promoting teams from the 2023–24 Belgian National Division 1 are both from ACFF side and the two relegating teams from the 2023–24 Challenger Pro League are both from VV side, then the lowest finishing VV team will be relegated directly irrespective of its finishing position and no playoffs will be held.
- the lowest finishing team from ACFF side will be relegated only if it finishes in position 18.

As a result the number of relegating teams is uncertain and might be zero, one or two.

== League Table ==
Pos	Team	Pld	W	D	L	GF	GA	GD	Pts	Aff.	Qualification or relegation
1	RAAL La Louvière (C, P)	34	26	5	3	76	19	57	83	ACFF	Promoted to the Challenger Pro League
2	Lokeren-Temse (P)	34	22	4	8	57	31	26	70	VV	Promoted to the Challenger Pro League
3	Knokke	34	15	9	10	54	39	15	54	VV	
4	Zébra Élites Charleroi	34	15	8	11	54	42	12	53	ACFF	
5	Thes	34	16	3	15	55	60	−5	51	VV	
6	Heist	34	15	6	13	55	52	3	51	VV	
7	Olympic Charleroi CF	34	13	11	10	59	51	8	50	ACFF	
8	Hoogstraten	34	14	7	13	44	50	−6	49	VV	
9	Jong KAA Gent	34	12	13	9	59	41	18	49	VV	
10	Virton	34	13	7	14	47	54	−7	46	ACFF	
11	Sint-Eloois-Winkel (R)	34	12	10	12	42	48	−6	46	VV	Team folding at the end of the season (Note: A maximum of one team from the VV side was able to be relegated this season, as Sint-Eloois-Winkel announced it was folding its first team it will be the only relegation from the VV side this season. The lowest finishing team from ACFF side will be relegated only if it finishes in position 18.)
12	Dessel	34	13	5	16	57	58	−1	44	VV	
13	Tienen	34	12	8	14	44	43	1	44	VV	
14	Young Reds Antwerp	34	12	4	18	39	54	−15	40	VV	
15	Union Namur	34	12	3	19	39	59	−20	39	ACFF	
16	OH Leuven U-23	34	8	6	20	42	65	−23	30	VV	
17	Visé (R)	34	6	11	17	39	59	−20	28 (Note: Vise were deducted one point for fielding an ineligible player)	ACFF	Team did not obtain license
18	Cappellen	34	7	6	21	36	73	−37	27	VV	

Source: RFBA
Rules for classification: 1) Points; 2) Matches won; 3) Goal difference; 4) Goals scored; 5) Away goals scored; 6) Away matches won.
(C) Champion; (P) Promoted; (R) Relegated

=== Results ===
Home \ Away	LAL	LOK	KNO	ZEB	TES	HEI	OLC	HOO	GNT	VIR	SEW	DES	TIE	YRA	UNA	OHL	VIS	CAP
RAAL La Louvière	—	3–0	0–3	2–0	2–0	1–2	4–0	3–1	3–1	3–0	3–0	3–0	2–1	2–1	8–1	3–1	3–0	0–0
Lokeren-Temse	0–0	—	0–1	4–0	4–0	2–1	2–1	3–1	2–2	1–3	1–0	2–1	3–0	0–3	3–1	3–1	4–1	2–1
Knokke	1–1	1–2	—	0–0	1–3	2–1	0–0	0–1	0–0	5–0	1–0	2–0	1–0	5–0	1–0	2–1	2–0	3–0
Zébra Élites Charleroi	1–4	1–0	2–1	—	2–3	1–0	3–1	3–0	1–2	2–0	1–2	2–2	1–1	3–1	5–0	0–1	1–0	5–0
Thes	0–1	2–1	4–2	1–3	—	1–2	0–3	2–2	2–1	3–1	2–0	4–2	4–1	2–1	3–4	0–3	2–1	5–0
Heist	0–2	1–2	2–2	3–0	4–1	—	2–2	1–0	0–4	0–1	4–0	1–3	2–2	2–4	1–0	2–0	1–1	2–3
Olympic Charleroi CF	1–0	1–2	1–0	2–2	0–1	3–2	—	2–1	3–3	3–3	4–1	2–1	2–1	2–2	5–1	2–1	2–2	2–2
Hoogstraten	0–5	1–1	2–0	1–1	3–1	2–3	3–1	—	2–2	3–2	2–1	2–1	0–0	1–2	0–2	2–0	2–1	1–0
Jong KAA Gent	1–1	1–1	2–2	1–1	1–0	0–1	0–0	2–3	—	5–0	2–3	2–2	0–1	2–0	4–0	3–0	2–1	2–2
Virton	2–2	0–1	1–1	0–1	0–1	4–2	1–3	1–0	2–0	—	1–1	2–1	1–0	1–0	0–1	1–1	2–3	4–0
Sint-Eloois-Winkel	0–1	0–1	2–2	2–2	1–1	2–0	2–1	2–2	2–1	4–0	—	1–1	0–2	1–0	1–5	2–1	1–1	3–0
Dessel	1–3	0–2	3–1	1–0	5–1	0–2	1–4	2–0	1–4	1–4	1–1	—	2–1	1–0	1–0	1–2	2–1	8–0
Tienen	0–1	1–0	1–2	3–1	4–0	1–1	1–0	3–0	0–4	2–1	0–1	0–4	—	0–1	1–0	2–0	3–3	0–1
Young Reds Antwerp	0–2	0–1	2–4	1–3	0–3	1–2	1–1	1–0	2–0	0–2	2–1	2–1	1–1	—	2–0	3–3	2–1	1–0
Union Namur	0–4	2–1	3–1	2–2	1–0	2–2	1–0	1–2	0–1	0–1	0–1	4–0	0–0	2–0	—	1–0	2–0	0–1
OH Leuven U-23	1–2	0–4	1–2	1–0	2–3	1–2	3–2	0–1	1–1	0–2	3–3	1–1	0–2	3–2	3–1	—	5–1	0–2
Visé	0–1	0–1	2–1	0–1	2–0	1–2	2–2 (Note: Match ended in a draw but Olympic Charleroi were awarded a forfeit victory due to Vise fielding an ineligible player)	0–0	2–2	1–1	0–0	0–3	2–2	2–0	2–0	2–2	—	4–1
Cappellen	0–1	0–1	2–2	0–3	0–0	1–2	0–1	1–3	0–1	3–3	0–1	2–3	2–7	0–1	3–2	5–0 (Note: The match between Cappellen and OH Leuven originally ended 0-1 but was converted into a forfeit victory due to a breach of the rules for youth teams.)	4–0	—

Source: Nationaal : 1st klasse (in Dutch)
Legend: Blue = home team win; Yellow = draw; Red = away team win.

== Team information ==
Locations of the 2023–24 Belgian National Division 1 teams

== Season statistics ==
=== Top scorers ===
As of 12 May 2024.

Rank	Player	Club	Goals
1	(Nigeria) Ahmed Abdullahi	Jong Gent	21
1	(Belgium) Jorn Vancamp	La Louvière	21
1	(Belgium) Lucas Walbrecq	Olympic Charleroi	21
2	(Belgium) Stan Braem	Lokeren-Temse	16
2	(Belgium) Jef Colman	Heist	16
3	(Belgium) Mayron de Almeida	Virton	14
3	(Belgium) Tim Jeunen	Thes Sport	14
4	(Belgium) Franck Idumbo-Muzambo	OH Leuven U23	13
4	(Belgium) Amadu Jalloh	Knokke	13
4	(Luxembourg) Lucas Prudhomme	Knokke	13
