= Emrehan Gedikli =

Footballer (born 2003)

Personal information
- Date of birth: 25 April 2003 (age 23)
- Place of birth: Oberhausen, Germany
- Height: 1.87 m (6 ft 2 in)
- Position: Forward

Team information
- Current team: Aliağa FK
- Number: 90

Youth career
- 2010–2022: Bayer Leverkusen

Senior career*
Years	Team	Apps	(Gls)
2020–2022	Bayer Leverkusen	1	(0)
2022–2023	Trabzonspor	0	(0)
2023	→ Austria Lustenau (loan)	4	(1)
2023–2025	Konyaspor	7	(0)
2024	→ İstanbulspor (loan)	7	(1)
2024–2025	→ Eupen (loan)	22	(7)
2025	Bursaspor	6	(1)
2026	RFC Liège	9	(0)
2026–	Aliağa FK	3	(0)

International career^{‡}
2018	Germany U15	2	(0)
2018–2019	Germany U16	5	(3)
2019–2020	Germany U17	8	(6)
2020	Germany U18	1	(0)
2021–2022	Germany U19	7	(1)
- * Club domestic league appearances and goals as of 1 October 2026 ‡ National team caps and goals as of 21:51, 29 March 2022 (UTC)

Emrehan Gedikli (born 25 April 2003) is a professional footballer who plays as a forward for Türkish TFF 2. Lig club Aliağa FK. Born in Germany, he represented it internationally on junior levels before deciding to represent Turkey.

== Club career ==
Gedikli made his professional debut for Bayer Leverkusen in the UEFA Europa League on 26 November 2020, coming on as a substitute in the 80th minute for Karim Bellarabi against Israeli Premier League side Hapoel Be'er Sheva. The home match finished as a 4–1 win for Leverkusen.

On 7 February 2022, Gedikli signed a 4.5-year deal with Turkish side Trabzonspor.

On 18 January 2023, he joined Austrian club Austria Lustenau on loan until the end of the season.

On 14 September 2023, Gedikli signed a three-year contract with Konyaspor.

On 5 February 2026, Gedikli joined RFC Liège in the Belgian Challenger Pro League.

== International career ==
Gedikli has represented Germany at all youth international levels from the under-15 set-up, all the way up to the under-19 national team.

In 2022, he accepted a call-up from the Turkish under-21 national team.

== Personal life ==
Gedikli was born in Oberhausen, North Rhine-Westphalia, and is of Turkish descent.

== Career statistics ==
=== Club ===
As of match played 21 December 2024

Appearances and goals by club, season and competition
Club	Season	League			National Cup (Note: Includes DFB-Pokal, Turkish Cup, Austrian Cup, Belgian Cup)		Continental		Other		Total	
Club	Season	Division	Apps	Goals	Apps	Goals	Apps	Goals	Apps	Goals	Apps	Goals
Bayer Leverkusen	2020-21	Bundesliga	1	0	0	0	3 (Note: Appearance(s) in UEFA Europa League)	0	—		4	0
Bayer Leverkusen	2021-22	Bundesliga	0	0	0	0	0	0	—		0	0
Bayer Leverkusen	Total		1	0	0	0	3	0	—		4	0
Trabzonspor	2021-22	Süper Lig	0	0	0	0	0	0	—		0	0
Trabzonspor	2022-23	Süper Lig	0	0	0	0	0	0	1 (Note: Appearance(s) in Turkish Super Cup)	0	1	0
Trabzonspor	Total		0	0	0	0	0	0	1	0	1	0
Austria Lustenau (loan)	2022-23	Austrian Bundesliga	4	1	0	0	—		0	0	4	1
Konyaspor	2023-24	Süper Lig	5	0	2	2	—		—		7	2
Konyaspor	2024-25	Süper Lig	2	0	0	0	—		—		2	0
Konyaspor	Total		7	0	2	2	—		—		9	2
İstanbulspor (loan)	2023-24	Süper Lig	7	1	0	0	—		—		7	1
Eupen (loan)	2024-25	Challenger Pro League	12	5	1	0	—		—		13	5
Career total			29	7	3	2	3	0	1	0	36	9

== Honours ==
Trabzonspor

- Süper Lig: 2021–22
- Turkish Super Cup: 2022
