= Salvatore Curaba =

Belgian entrepreneur and former footballer (born 1963)

- Born: Salvatore Curaba; August 27, 1963; La Louvière, Belgium.
- Education: ICT Engineering at ICET Cuemes
- Occupations: EASI Founder and Managing Director

Salvatore Curaba (born August 27, 1963, in La Louvière, Belgium) is an entrepreneur and former professional football player.

== Early life ==
Salvatore Curaba's parents left Italy for Belgium in 1956. His father worked in the mines of Saint-Vaast, Fontaine l’Évêque and Sainte-Marguerite. After studying Math and Latin in Saint-Joseph school, Salvatore Curaba studied ICT Engineering at ICET Cuemes for 2 years.

== Football career (1972–1991) ==
=== Royale Association Athlétique Louviéroise ===
1972–1982

As many kids of his age, Salvatore was passionate about football. He started playing at Royale Association Athlétique Louviéroise at 9 years old. He made his debut in the first team in 1982 at 19 years old in second division.

82-83: Second Division. Coach: André Gorez

=== Royal Charleroi Sporting Club ===
83-84: Second Division. Coach: Eric Vanlessen

84-85: Second Division. Coach: André Colasse

On 21 June 1985, the RSCS won the « Final Round » and was upgraded in first division.

85-86: First Division. Coach: André Colasse

86-87: First Division. Coach: André Colasse

87-88: RCSC turned professional. Coach: Aimé Anthuenis

At the end of this season, after 70 matched played in First Division, Salvatore Curaba had to choose between a full-time professional football player career or an IT career. He opted for IT but kept playing football for the RAAL (third division).

=== Royale Association Ahtlétique Louviéroise ===
88-89: Third Division. Coach: Casimir Jagiello

89-90: Third Division. Coach: Guy Fromont

=== Stade Louvain ===
90-91: Second Division. Coach: Vince Biganti

== Coach formation ==
At 27 years old, after few injuries, Salvatore Curaba decided to stop his football career and went for a football coach formation.

91-93: Belgian trainer school (UEFA B Certificate)

== IT career (1983–1999) ==
=== SBAI ===
In 1983, Salvatore Curaba started working at SBAI, an ICT company. He started as a programmer, became an analyst and after 3 years he was a project manager specialized in the hospital sector. While working for SBAI Salvatore was also a professional football player for the Royal Charleroi Sporting Club.

=== IBS ===
==== Sales Rep ====
In 1988, after quitting his career as a professional football player for the Royal Charleroi Sporting Club, Salvatore Curaba became Sales representative for the IT company Proget (which will be bought by IBS in 1996).

==== Sales Manager ====
In 1994, Salvatore Curaba had to choose between a career as football coach or keep evolving in the IT sector. He opted for IT and was promoted Sales Manager for IBS. In 1998, after 10 years in this company and a few months before being nominated General Manager for IBS's Brussels offices, Salvatore left the company to found his own IT company, EASI.

== Entrepreneurship career (1999-today) ==
=== EASI ===
==== Founder & Managing Partner ====
On March 26, 1999, Salvatore Curaba, together with Christian Castelain, formed EASI, a computer services firm in Belgium, offering software, mobile apps, infrastructures, and cloud computing. In 2012, the number of EASI employees hit 90. Curaba then purchased Castelain's share in the company to be the only CEO of EASI, setting up a management system based on employee ownership and open operations. According to his management philosophy, Curaba continuously offers company shares to its employees. In 2015 and 2016, EASI, with 150 employees, was selected as "Best Workplace" in Belgium and 8th in Europe. Moreover, Curaba became the finalist for the 2014 Manager of the Year award by Trends-Tendances. Furthermore, EASI was a finalist for the 2015 Enterprise of the Year award.

=== Football clubs ===
In 2015, after more than 30 years away from the football sector, Salvatore Curaba was approached to take over the Royal Albert Elisabeth Club from Mons. The deal was never concluded.

Later in 2015, the Union Royale la Louviere Centre also contacted him to take over the club. These negotiations didn't lead to a deal yet.

== Public speaker ==
Since 2014, Salvatore Curaba has regularly given speeches and conferences around Belgium, in which he links his former challenges as professional football player with his career as a business man and entrepreneur.

== Awards, honors and press ==
2014: Nominated for Manager of the year (Trends Tendance)

2015: EASI finalist for Company of the year (EY)

2015: Best Workplace Belgium (Vlerick Business School)

2016: Best Workplace Belgium (Vlerick Business School)

8 Times: Trends Gazelles
