= Vancy Mabanza =

Burundian footballer

Personal information
- Full name: Vancy Roméo Mabanza
- Date of birth: 27 November 2000 (age 25)
- Place of birth: Brazzaville, Congo
- Height: 1.96 m (6 ft 5 in)
- Position: Striker

Team information
- Current team: Lokeren
- Number: 11

Youth career
- 2016–2018: Poto-Poto
- 2018–2019: IR Tangier
- 2019–2020: AS Vita
- 2020: Torpedo-BelAZ
- 2020–2022: Djoliba

Senior career*
Years	Team	Apps	(Gls)
2022–2024	Warnant	45	(19)
2024	Schifflange	9	(3)
2024–2025	Tienen	15	(9)
2025	Patro Eisden	25	(4)
2026–	Lokeren	17	(11)

International career^{‡}
2025–	Burundi	2	(0)
- * Club domestic league appearances and goals as of 20 September 2026 ‡ National team caps and goals as of 00:54, 20 October 2025 (UTC)

Vancy Roméo Mabanza (born 27 November 2000) is a professional footballer who plays as a striker for Challenger Pro League club Lokeren in Belgium. Born in the Republic of the Congo, he plays for the Burundi national team.

== Club career ==
Mabanza is a product of the Congolese club Poto-Poto, stints with the Moroccan club IR Tangier and DR Congolese club AS Vita. Torpedo-BelAZ in Belarus in a move that was complicated by the COVID-19 pandemic. He moved to the Malian club Djoliba in 2022. He began his senior career with in the Belgian Division 2 in 2022. On 15 January 2024, he moved to the Luxembourg National Division side Schifflange. In the summer of 2024, he moved to Tienen where he scored 9 goals in 15 games in the Belgian Division 1. On 9 February 2025, he transferred to Patro Eisden in the Challenger Pro League. Current team K.S.C. Lokeren (2025) since beginning of 2026. Played 3 matches and scored 4 times.

== International career ==
Born in the Republic of the Congo, Mabanza is of Burundian descent. He was called up to the Burundi national team for a set of 2026 FIFA World Cup qualification matches in March 2025.
