= KSC Lokeren (2025) =

Belgian football club

Lokeren
- Full name: Koninklijke Sporting Club Lokeren
- Nickname: KSC Lokeren
- Founded: 1945; 81 years ago as KSV Temse; 2020; 6 years ago as KSC Lokeren-Temse; 2025; 1 year ago as KSC Lokeren
- Ground: Daknamstadion, Lokeren
- Capacity: 12,136
- Chairman: Hans Van Duysen
- Manager: Stijn Vreven
- League: Challenger Pro League
- 2025–26: Challenger Pro League, 8th of 17
Home colours	Away colours	Third colours

Koninklijke Sporting Club Lokeren, commonly referred to as KSC Lokeren, Sporting Lokeren or simply Lokeren, is a Belgian professional football club based in Lokeren, East Flanders. The team competes in the Challenger Pro League, the second tier of the Belgian football league system.

The club was formed in 2020 through a merger between K.S.C. Lokeren Oost-Vlaanderen, which had declared bankruptcy earlier that year, and K.S.V. Temse, a lower-league side founded in 1945 in the neighbouring town of Temse. Initially named K.S.C. Lokeren-Temse, the club changed its name to K.S.C. Lokeren in 2025. Lokeren play their home matches at the Daknamstadion, the historic ground of the former Lokeren club, and wear white and black as their traditional colours.

== History ==
=== Temse ===
Before the Second World War, the town of Temse was home to two official football clubs: Racing Temsche (matricule 807), founded in 1908 and playing in blue and yellow, later renamed FC Temsica; and Temsche SK (matricule 501), founded in 1924 and wearing red and white. The latter was the more successful of the two, spending six seasons in the Belgian Third Division during the 1930s.

In 1945, the two clubs merged to form KSV Temse (matricule 4297), adopting blue and white as club colours. The newly formed side competed in the Belgian Provincial Leagues, where it remained for much of its history. In the 21st century, the club began to ascend the league system, reaching the Belgian Fourth Division in 2003 and earning promotion to the Third Division in 2009. After league restructuring, it settled into the Belgian Second Amateur Division, the fourth tier of Belgian football.

=== Lokeren ===
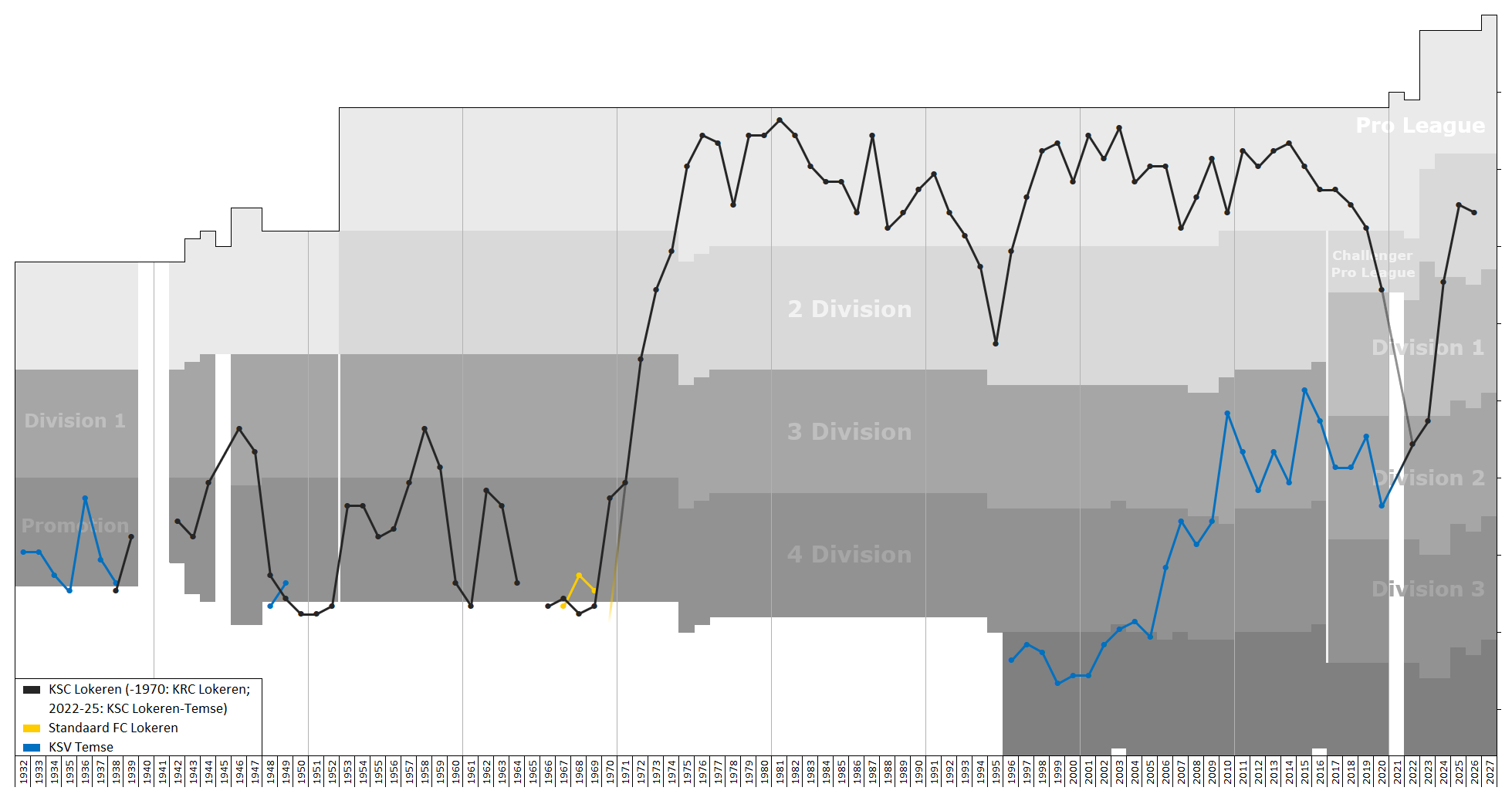
Historical chart of KSC Lokeren league performance

Matricule 282 was first assigned in 1920 to Football Club Racing Club Lokeren, nicknamed Racing FC, though the club ceased operations the following year. A new club, Racing Club Lokeren, was established on 22 January 1923. Between 1945 and 1951, it briefly operated as Racing Athletiek- en Football Club Lokeren before adopting the name Koninklijke Racing Club Lokeren.

In 1970, due to financial difficulties, the club merged with city rivals Koninklijke Standaard FC Lokeren to form Koninklijke Sporting Club Lokeren (KSC Lokeren). The team enjoyed its greatest success in the late 1970s and early 1980s, including multiple appearances in the UEFA Cup. The 1980–81 season marked a peak: Lokeren reached the quarter-finals of the UEFA Cup, finished runners-up in the Belgian First Division, and reached the final of the Belgian Cup, where they lost to Standard Liège.

While subsequent years brought fewer accolades, the club remained a fixture in the top flight—apart from a brief period in the mid-1990s—and regularly finished mid-table. In 2000, KSC Lokeren merged with Koninklijke Sint-Niklaas SKE to form Sporting Lokeren Sint-Niklaas Waasland. A further name change occurred in 2003, with the club rebranding as K.S.C. Lokeren Oost-Vlaanderen to reflect the broader provincial identity.

Lokeren won the Belgian Cup twice in the 2010s, lifting the trophy in both 2012 and 2014. The latter campaign also included a notable run in the UEFA Europa League, during which the club eliminated Hull City to reach the group stage. In 2019, after nearly 25 years in the top division, Lokeren were relegated to the First Division B. Later that year, a new ownership group led by Louis de Vries and Alexander Janssen took over the club.

=== Bankruptcy and merger ===
In April 2020, during the ongoing 2019–20 season, Lokeren was declared bankrupt. With debts exceeding €5 million and unable to pay its staff and players, the club ceased operations and was dissolved.

Shortly thereafter, a merger agreement was reached with KSV Temse to form a new entity: Sporting Club Lokeren-Temse (S.C. Lokeren-Temse), which would retain Temse's matricule (4297) but relocate to Lokeren's stadium. The club continues under the matricule of Temse but relocated to the stadium of Lokeren.

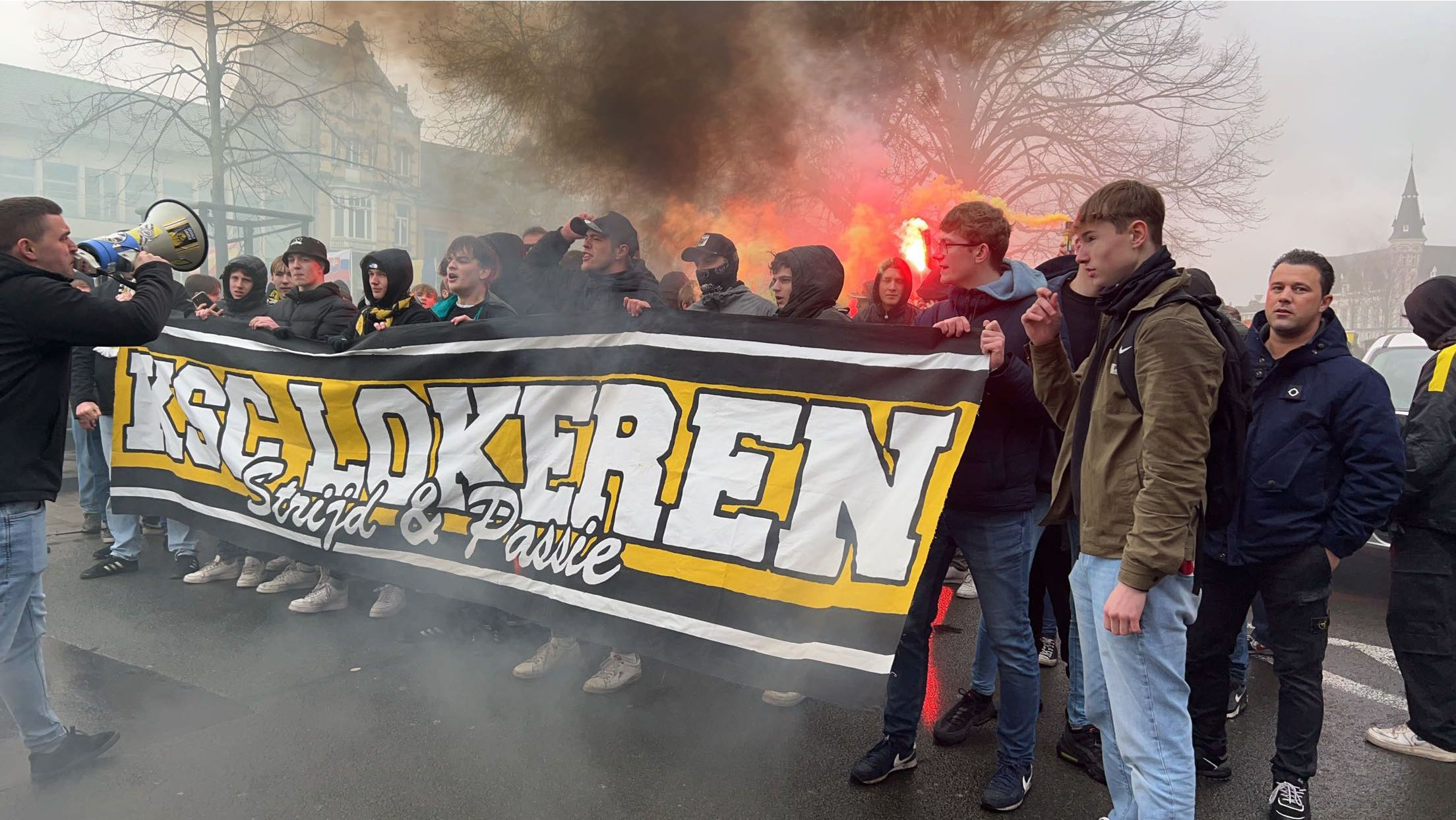
Lokeren-Temse supporters in 2023

The new club began life in the Belgian Division 2, the fourth national tier. In 2022–23, Lokeren-Temse won the Division 2 VV A title and earned promotion to the Belgian National Division 1. A second successive promotion followed in 2023–24, after finishing as runners-up. With a professional license granted, the club was admitted to the Challenger Pro League for the 2024–25 season. In 2025, the club changed its name to K.S.C. Lokeren.

== Current squad ==
As of 25 September 2026

Note: Flags indicate national team as defined under FIFA eligibility rules; some limited exceptions apply. Players may hold more than one non-FIFA nationality.

No.	Pos.	Nation	Player
1	GK	BEL	Jorn Brondeel
2	DF	BEL	Robin Denuit
3	DF	BEL	Djovkar Doudaev
7	FW	MAR	Anisse Brrou
8	MF	ALB	Luan Simnica
9	FW	GER	Jorden Aigboje
10	MF	FRA	Maxime Pau
11	FW	BDI	Vancy Mabanza
14	MF	BEL	Toon Janssen
16	DF	ESP	Jordi Palacios
17	FW	CIV	Aboubacar Dindane
19	DF	BEL	Matias Lloci
20	FW	ENG	Ademola Ola-Adebomi

No.	Pos.	Nation	Player
21	FW	FRA	Salim Ben Seghir
25	DF	BEL	Jérôme Arens
26	DF	BEL	Jarno Vervaque
27	MF	BEL	Rune Van Den Bergh
29	DF	BEL	Andreas Spegelaere
34	MF	BEL	Jassim Mazouz
55	MF	BEL	Sam Van Aerschot
56	GK	BEL	Simon Vervacke
61	GK	BEL	Viktor Van Israel
75	FW	BEL	Ilyas Zerioh
76	DF	BEL	Jonas Lietaert
80	FW	FRA	Modeste Duku
81	GK	BEL	Céryl De Schrijver

== Honours ==
- Belgian National Division 1
  - Runner-up (1): 2023–24
- Belgian Division 2
  - Winner (1): 2022–23
