= 2025–26 Olympic Charleroi season =

Olympic Charleroi
2025–26 season
- Manager: Darko Janacković (until 26 August); Nadjib Abdelli (caretaker); Carlos Sánchez Aguiar (from 2 September)
- Stadium: Stade de la Neuville
- Challenger Pro League: 16th
- Belgian Cup: Seven round
- Top goalscorer: League: Robert Ion (3); All: Robert Ion (3)
- Biggest win: 1–0 vs RFC Liège
- Biggest defeat: 0–4 vs RWDM
Home colours	Away colours
- All statistics correct as of 19 January 2026.

The 2025–26 season is the 115th in the history of Olympic Charleroi and marks the club's return to the second tier of Belgian football for the first time since the 2008–09 season. In addition to the Challenger Pro League, the team also competed in the Belgian Cup.

== Season Overview ==
The club began the season under Darko Janacković, but after a difficult start in the professional ranks, he was dismissed on 26 August. Following a brief caretaker period under Nadjib Abdelli, veteran Spanish manager Carlos Sánchez Aguiar was appointed on 2 September to lead the club's survival effort.

Olympic Charleroi staged its first two home matches at the Stade du Pays de Charleroi, home of neighboring club Sporting Charleroi, due to renovation work at the Stade de la Neuville.

In the Belgian Cup, the club reached the sixth round where they were eliminated by Antwerp following a narrow 1–0 defeat. As of 19 January 2026, the club sits 15th in the league, fighting to avoid the relegation play-offs.

== Current squad ==
As of 15 November 2025

Note: Flags indicate national team as defined under FIFA eligibility rules; some limited exceptions apply. Players may hold more than one non-FIFA nationality.

No.	Pos.	Nation	Player
1	GK	CZE	David Vitásek
2	MF	MNE	Oliver Sarkic
3	DF	CMR	Karl Ndedi
4	DF	NOR	Hasan Jahic
5	DF	BEL	Antonio Thea
6	DF	BEL	Kevin Kis
7	FW	FRA	Mohamed Cissé
8	FW	NED	Toshio Lake
9	FW	NED	Raphaël Eyongo (on loan from RAAL La Louvière)
10	MF	ROU	Robert Ion
11	MF	ROU	Luca Florică
12	DF	ANG	Jonás Ramalho
13	MF	TUN	Mohamed Medfai
16	DF	FRA	Soudeysse Kari (on loan from Charleroi)

No.	Pos.	Nation	Player
17	MF	BEL	Mathieu Cachbach
18	MF	LUX	Rayan Berberi
21	FW	CRO	Vito Kopić
22	FW	IRQ	Abdullah Hameed
23	GK	ESP	Iago Herrerín
26	GK	BEL	Adrien Saussez
28	DF	BEL	Elias Spago
38	MF	BEL	Thierno Diallo (on loan from RAAL La Louvière)
40	GK	BEL	Matthias Van Hecke
49	DF	CTA	Kenny Kima Beyissa
55	DF	FRA	Victor Corneillie
77	DF	BEL	Luca Ferrara
81	FW	BEL	Niklo Dailly

== Transfers ==
=== Transfers In ===
Pos.	Player	Transferred from	Fee	Date	Source
GK	(Czech Republic) David Vitasek	(Czech Republic) Slovan Velvary	Undisclosed	2 July 2025	
DF	(Bosnia and Herzegovina) Hasan Jahić	(Romania) Petrolul Ploiești	Free	3 July 2025	
MF	(Luxembourg) Rayan Berberi	(Czech Republic) Dynamo České Budějovice	Undisclosed	4 July 2025	
MF	(Romania) Luca Florică	(Czech Republic) Chrudim	Free	5 July 2025	
MF	(Romania) Robert Ion	(Romania) Concordia Chiajna	Free	9 July 2025	
MF	(Belgium) Thierno Diallo	(Belgium) RAAL La Louvière	Loan	9 July 2025	
FW	(Netherlands) Raphaël Eyongo	(Belgium) RAAL La Louvière	Loan	12 July 2025	
FW	(Serbia) Slobodan Stanojlović	(Serbia) OFK Beograd	Free	19 July 2025	
DF	(France) Victor Corneillie	(Belgium) La Louvière	Free	24 July 2025	
FW	(Belgium) Niklo Dailly	(Belgium) RWDM Brussels	Free	28 August 2025	
MF	(Montenegro) Oliver Sarkic	(Montenegro) Budućnost Podgorica	Free	6 September 2025	

=== Transfers Out ===
Pos.	Player	Transferred to	Fee	Date	Source
FW	(Belgium) Léandro Rousseau	(Belgium) Patro Eisden	Undisclosed	1 July 2025	
DF	(Belgium) Ayoub Kouri	(Belgium) UR Namur	Free	1 July 2025	
MF	(France) Noah Lobe	(Belgium) La Louvière B	Free	1 July 2025	
MF	(Cameroon) Elisha Feugna Temou	(Belgium) RFC Meux	Free	1 July 2025	
MF	(Belgium) Jérémie Luvovadio	(Belgium) Meix-devant-Virton	Free	1 July 2025	
DF	(Senegal) Thierno Gaye	(Belgium) Union SG B	Free	1 July 2025	
DF	(Belgium) Bryan Verboom	Released	N/A	1 July 2025	
FW	(Mauritania) Souleymane Kamara	(France) US Feignies Aulnoye	Free	1 July 2025	
FW	(France) Abdoulkhadre Gassama	(Belgium) RAAL La Louvière	End of Loan	1 July 2025	
MF	(Belgium) Simon Paulet	(Belgium) RFC Liège	Free	2 July 2025	
DF	(Comoros) Aaron Kamardin	(Belgium) Patro Eisden	Free	20 July 2025	
DF	(Algeria) Toufik Zeghdane	(Luxembourg) FC Atert Bissen	Free	24 July 2025	
MF	(Algeria) Mehdi Terki	(Luxembourg) FC Atert Bissen	Free	24 July 2025	

== Friendlies ==
28 June 2025 Friendly	Zulte Waregem (Belgium)	1–1	(Belgium) Olympic Charleroi	Waregem
17:00	Vossen 40'	Report	Ferber 65'	Stadium: Waregem Expo Training Center

2 July 2025 Friendly	FC UNA Strassen (Luxembourg)	1–1	(Belgium) Olympic Charleroi	Strassen, Luxembourg
14:00		Report		Stadium: Complexe Sportif Jean Wirtz

12 July 2025 Friendly	De Graafschap (Netherlands)	2–0	(Belgium) Olympic Charleroi	Doetinchem
14:00	Mahi 15'; Brittijn 55'	Report		Stadium: Sportpark De Bezelhorst; Attendance: 450

21 July 2025 Friendly	Olympic Charleroi (Belgium)	1–1	(France) Marseille	Marseille (Behind closed doors)
11:00	Ferber 23'	Report	Greenwood 70'	Stadium: Robert Louis-Dreyfus Centre; Attendance: 0

24 July 2025 Friendly	Union Rochefortoise (Belgium)	1–1	(Belgium) Olympic Charleroi	Rochefort
19:30		Report!		Stadium: Parc des Roches

2 August 2025 Friendly	Roda JC (Netherlands)	3–3	(Belgium) Olympic Charleroi	Kerkrade
15:00	Cukur 12'; Ould-Chikh 44'; Peña Zauner 88'	Report	Dailly 30'; Ion 60'; Berberi 75'	Stadium: Parkstad Limburg Stadion

== Competitions ==
=== Overall record ===
Competition	First match	Last match	Starting round	Final position	Record							
Competition	First match	Last match	Starting round	Final position	Pld	W	D	L	GF	GA	GD	Win %
Challenger Pro League	15 August 2025	18 April 2026	Matchday 1		19	4	5	10	18	32	−14	21.05
Belgian Cup	7 September 2025	29 October 2025	Sixth round	Seventh round	2	1	0	1	3	4	−1	50.00
Total					21	5	5	11	21	36	−15	23.81

Last updated: 19 January 2026
Source: Belgian FA

=== Challenger Pro League ===
==== League table ====
Pos	Team	Pld	W	D	L	GF	GA	GD	Pts	Qualification
13	RWDM Brussels (Note: RWDM was not granted a license for either First Division B or Division 1 for the 2026-27 season. As a result, the club is relegated to the Second Division and is considered to have finished last. As a result, Club NXT was spared of relegation.) (R)	32	9	9	14	50	54	−4	33 (Note: After already having been penalized with one point for the coming 2026–27 season, on 3 March 2026 RWDM Brussels was also penalized three points with immediate effect for not being able to prove that certain debts had been paid before the deadline of 2 March 2026.)	Relegated to Belgian Division 1
14	RSCA Futures^{U23} (Note: Ineligible for promotion or promotion play-offs; During the season, U23-teams also could not be relegated unless a U23-team from the same wing (ACFF/VV) finished in the top three of Division 1. However towards the end of the season, first the BMA (Belgian Competition Authority) had ruled that it was illegal to make some teams ineligible for relegation while others could be relegated, penalizing the Pro League (organization of professional football teams) with a yearly 12 million Euro fine as long as they kept the rule in place. Then, at the end of the season, the BMA intervened and abolished the rule themselves, overriding the authority of the Pro League by citing urgency. The urgency in this case being the precarious financial state of RWDM Brussels, which claimed to have found an investor who was willing to take over the club and prevent it from going bankrupt, under the condition that the club remained at the second level and did not get relegated to the amateur levels. As a result, with the rule abolished, RWDM Brussels remained in the Challenger Pro League and 16th-place finisher Club NXT was relegated instead. Two weeks later, RWDM Brussels was not awarded a professional football licence and hence was relegated to the Belgian Division 1, which meant Club NXT was spared after all. Another few weeks later, to avoid the fine, the Pro League voted to abolish the rule that prevented U23-teams to be relegated from the 2026-27 season. This puts the whole reform (removal of playoffs and return to 18 teams) under uncertainty, as this was allegedly voted as one package, and legal proceedings to reverse the decision have been started.)	32	7	10	15	46	55	−9	31	
15	Jong Genk^{U23}	32	7	10	15	42	59	−17	31	
16	Club NXT^{U23}	32	5	6	21	33	55	−22	21	
17	Olympic Charleroi (R)	32	3	7	22	26	68	−42	16	Relegated to Belgian Division 1

Source: Challenger Pro League
Rules for classification: 1) Points; 2) Matches won; 3) Goal difference; 4) Goals scored; 5) Away matches won; 6) Away goal difference; 7) Away goals made.
(R) Relegated

==== Results summary ====
Overall								Home						Away					
Pld	W	D	L	GF	GA	GD	Pts	W	D	L	GF	GA	GD	W	D	L	GF	GA	GD
19	4	5	10	18	32	−14	17	2	3	5	10	15	−5	2	2	5	8	17	−9

Last updated: 17 January 2026.
Source: Pro League Official

==== Results by round ====
Round	1	2	3	4	5	6	7	8	9	10	11	12	13	14	15	16	17	18	19
Ground	H	A	H	A	H	H	A	H	H	A	H	A	H	A	H	A	H	A	A
Result	L	L	L	L	L	L	D	L	L	D	D	W	L	W	D	D	L	D	L
Position	16	16	16	16	16	16	16	16	16	16	16	16	16	14	14	16	16	16	16

Updated to match(es) played on 19 January 2026. Source: Pro League
A = Away; H = Home; W = Win; D = Draw; L = Loss

9 August 2025 1	Olympic Charleroi	1–4	Gent U23	Charleroi
20:00	Lake			Stadium: Stade de la Neuville

17 August 2025 2	Lommel SK	3–0	Olympic Charleroi	Lommel
19:15				Stadium: Soevereinstadion

24 August 2025 3	Olympic Charleroi	0–3	Kortrijk	Charleroi
16:00				Stadium: Stade de la Neuville

31 August 2025 4	Seraing	3–1	Olympic Charleroi	Seraing
13:30			Dailly	Stadium: Stade du Pairay

14 September 2025 5	Olympic Charleroi	0–5	Beveren	Charleroi
20:00				Stadium: Stade de la Neuville

24 September 2025 6	Olympic Charleroi	0–2	RSCA Futures	Charleroi
20:00				Stadium: Stade de la Neuville

29 September 2025 7	Lierse	0–0	Olympic Charleroi	Lier
20:00				Stadium: Herman Vanderpoortenstadion

5 October 2025 8	Olympic Charleroi	0–1	Sporting Lokeren	Charleroi
16:00				Stadium: Stade de la Neuville

18 October 2025 9	Olympic Charleroi	0–1	Eupen	Charleroi
20:00				Stadium: Stade de la Neuville

25 October 2025 10	Club NXT	1–1	Olympic Charleroi	Roeselare
16:00			Dailly	Stadium: Schiervelde Stadion

2 November 2025 11	Olympic Charleroi	1–1	RFC Liège	Charleroi
16:00	Dailly			Stadium: Stade de la Neuville

9 November 2025 12	Francs Borains	0–1	Olympic Charleroi	Boussu
19:15			Rousseau	Stadium: Stade Robert Urbain

23 November 2025 13	Olympic Charleroi	1–2	Beerschot VA	Charleroi
13:30	Dailly			Stadium: Stade de la Neuville

30 November 2025 14	Jong Genk	3–4	Olympic Charleroi	Geel
13:30			Dailly 30'; Ion 60', 84'; Berberi 75'	Stadium: ASV Geel Stadium; Attendance: 450; Referee: Michiel De Cuyper

6 December 2025 15	Olympic Charleroi	0–0	Patro Eisden	Charleroi
20:00				Stadium: Stade de la Neuville; Attendance: 852; Referee: Anthony Letellier

14 December 2025 16	RWDM	3–3	Olympic Charleroi	Sint-Jans-Molenbeek
19:15	Persyn 15'; Segovia 65'; Maurer 73'		Lake 4'; Dailly 60'; Berberi 90+6'	Stadium: Edmond Machtens Stadium; Attendance: 1,143; Referee: Klass Clerkx

17 December 2025 17	Olympic Charleroi	1–2	Lommel SK	Charleroi
20:00	Berberi			Stadium: Stade de la Neuville

22 December 2025 18	Eupen	2–2	Olympic Charleroi	Eupen
20:00				Stadium: Kehrwegstadion

18 January 2026 19	Beerschot VA	2–1	Olympic Charleroi	Antwerp
16:00				Stadium: Olympisch Stadion

=== Belgian Cup ===
7 September 2025	Olympic Charleroi (2)	3–1	Brainois (4)	Charleroi
16:00 CEST	Dailly 20'; Sarkic 45'; Ion 88'	Report	Sampaoli 46'	Stadium: Stade de la Neuville

28 October 2025	Dender EH (1)	4–2 (a.e.t.)	Olympic Charleroi (2)	Denderleeuw
20:30 CET	Nsimba 66'; Kadiri 90', 102'; Acquah 95'	Report	Corneillie 21'; Dailly 47' (pen.)	Stadium: Dender Football Complex
