= List of Atlético Madrid managers =

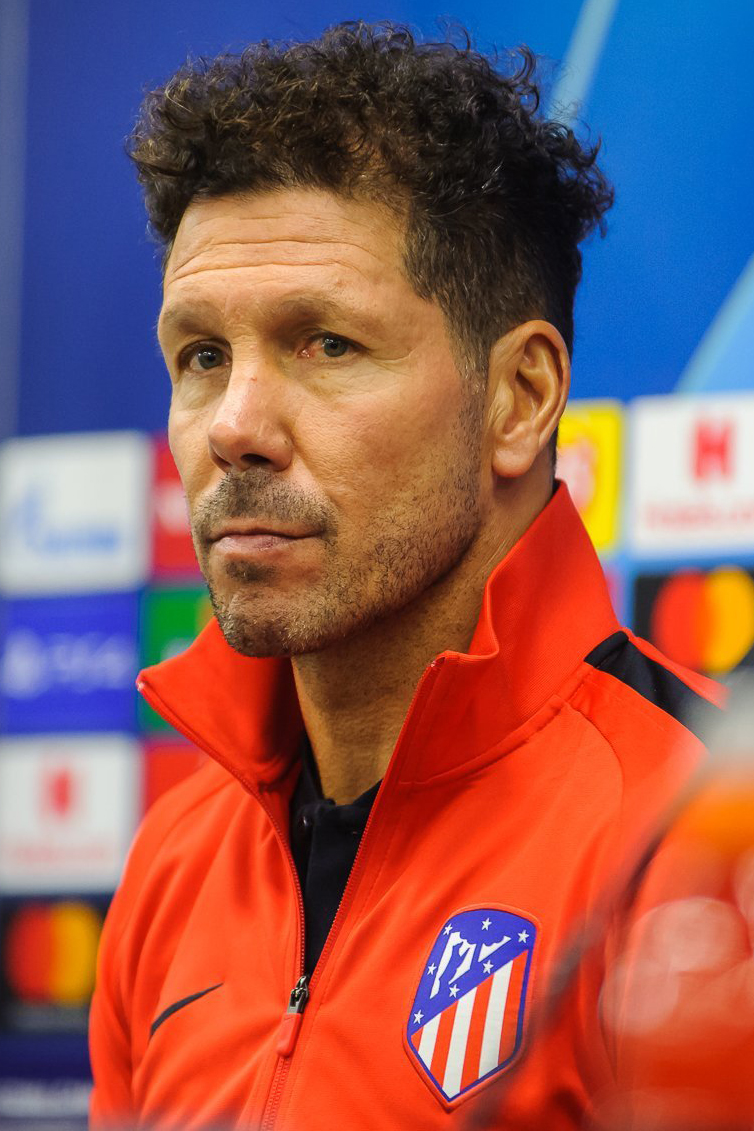
Diego Simeone is the most successful Atlético Madrid manager, with eight honours.

This is a list of all former coaches of Atlético Madrid. Current coach Diego Simeone took over from Gregorio Manzano on 23 December 2011.

== Managers ==
As of match played 20 September 2026

| Manager | Nationality | From | To | M | W | D | L | GF | GA | Win% | Honours | Notes |
|---|---|---|---|---|---|---|---|---|---|---|---|---|
| Manuel Ansoleaga | (Restoration (Spain)) Spain | 1921 | 1922 | (n/a) | (n/a) | (n/a) | (n/a) | (n/a) | (n/a) | (n/a) | 1 Campeonato Regional Centro | |
| Urbano Iturbe | (Restoration (Spain)) Spain | 1922 | 1923 | (n/a) | (n/a) | (n/a) | (n/a) | (n/a) | (n/a) | (n/a) | | |
| Vince Hayes | England | 1923 | 1924 | (n/a) | (n/a) | (n/a) | (n/a) | (n/a) | (n/a) | (n/a) | | |
| Ramón Olalquiaga | (Restoration (Spain)) Spain | 1924 | 1925 | (n/a) | (n/a) | (n/a) | (n/a) | (n/a) | (n/a) | (n/a) | 1 Campeonato Regional Centro | |
| Fred Pentland | England | 1925 | 1926 | (n/a) | (n/a) | (n/a) | (n/a) | (n/a) | (n/a) | (n/a) | | |
| Antonio de Miguel | (Restoration (Spain)) Spain | 1926 | 1927 | (n/a) | (n/a) | (n/a) | (n/a) | (n/a) | (n/a) | (n/a) | | |
| Julián Ruete | (Restoration (Spain)) Spain | 1927 | 1927 | (n/a) | (n/a) | (n/a) | (n/a) | (n/a) | (n/a) | (n/a) | | |
| Fred Pentland | England | 1927 | 1929 | (n/a) | (n/a) | (n/a) | (n/a) | (n/a) | (n/a) | (n/a) | 1 Campeonato Regional Centro | |
| Ángel Romo | (Restoration (Spain)) Spain | 1929 | 1930 | (n/a) | (n/a) | (n/a) | (n/a) | (n/a) | (n/a) | (n/a) | | |
| Rudolf Jeny | Hungary | 1930 | 1932 | (n/a) | (n/a) | (n/a) | (n/a) | (n/a) | (n/a) | (n/a) | | |
| Javier Barroso | Spain | 1932 | 1932 | (n/a) | (n/a) | (n/a) | (n/a) | (n/a) | (n/a) | (n/a) | | |
| Walter Harris | England | 1932 | 1933 | (n/a) | (n/a) | (n/a) | (n/a) | (n/a) | (n/a) | (n/a) | | |
| Manuel Anatol | Spain | 1933 | 1933 | (n/a) | (n/a) | (n/a) | (n/a) | (n/a) | (n/a) | (n/a) | | |
| Arcadio Arteaga | Spain | 1933 | 1933 | (n/a) | (n/a) | (n/a) | (n/a) | (n/a) | (n/a) | (n/a) | | |
| Fred Pentland | England | 1933 | 1935 | (n/a) | (n/a) | (n/a) | (n/a) | (n/a) | (n/a) | (n/a) | | |
| Josep Samitier | Spain | 1935 | 1936 | (n/a) | (n/a) | (n/a) | (n/a) | (n/a) | (n/a) | (n/a) | | |
| Ricardo Zamora | Spain | 1939 | 1940 | (n/a) | (n/a) | (n/a) | (n/a) | (n/a) | (n/a) | (n/a) | 1 La Liga, 1 Campeonato Regional Centro | |
| Lafuente | Spain | 1940 | 1940 | (n/a) | (n/a) | (n/a) | (n/a) | (n/a) | (n/a) | (n/a) | | |
| Ricardo Zamora | Spain | 1940 | 1946 | (n/a) | (n/a) | (n/a) | (n/a) | (n/a) | (n/a) | (n/a) | 1 La Liga, 1 Copa Federación Centro | |
| Emilio Vidal | Spain | 1946 | 1948 | (n/a) | (n/a) | (n/a) | (n/a) | (n/a) | (n/a) | (n/a) | 1 Supercopa de España | |
| Lino Taioli | Argentina | 1948 | 1949 | (n/a) | (n/a) | (n/a) | (n/a) | (n/a) | (n/a) | (n/a) | | |
| Helenio Herrera | Argentina | 1949 | 1953 | (n/a) | (n/a) | (n/a) | (n/a) | (n/a) | (n/a) | (n/a) | 2 La Liga, 1 Supercopa de España | |
| Ramón Colón | Spain | 1953 | 1953 | (n/a) | (n/a) | (n/a) | (n/a) | (n/a) | (n/a) | (n/a) | | |
| Benito Díaz | Spain | 1953 | 1954 | (n/a) | (n/a) | (n/a) | (n/a) | (n/a) | (n/a) | (n/a) | | |
| Jacinto Quincoces | Spain | 1954 | 1955 | (n/a) | (n/a) | (n/a) | (n/a) | (n/a) | (n/a) | (n/a) | | |
| Antonio Barrios | Spain | 1955 | 1957 | (n/a) | (n/a) | (n/a) | (n/a) | (n/a) | (n/a) | (n/a) | | |
| Ferdinand Daučík | Czechoslovakia | 1957 | 1959 | (n/a) | (n/a) | (n/a) | (n/a) | (n/a) | (n/a) | (n/a) | | |
| José Villalonga | Spain | 1959 | 1962 | (n/a) | (n/a) | (n/a) | (n/a) | (n/a) | (n/a) | (n/a) | 2 Copa del Rey, 1 UEFA Cup Winners' Cup | |
| Rafael García Repullo | Spain | 1962 | 1963 | (n/a) | (n/a) | (n/a) | (n/a) | (n/a) | (n/a) | (n/a) | | Lost against Tottenham Hotspur in the final of the UEFA Cup Winners´ Cup of 1962–63 |
| Adrián Escudero | Spain | 1963 | 1963 | (n/a) | (n/a) | (n/a) | (n/a) | (n/a) | (n/a) | (n/a) | | |
| Sabino Barinaga | Spain | 1963 | 1964 | (n/a) | (n/a) | (n/a) | (n/a) | (n/a) | (n/a) | (n/a) | | |
| Otto Bumbel | Brazil | 1964 | 1965 | (n/a) | (n/a) | (n/a) | (n/a) | (n/a) | (n/a) | (n/a) | 1 Copa del Rey | |
| Domènec Balmanya | Spain | 1965 | 1966 | (n/a) | (n/a) | (n/a) | (n/a) | (n/a) | (n/a) | (n/a) | 1 La Liga | |
| Otto Glória | Brazil | 1966 | 1968 | 55 | 24 | 15 | 16 | (n/a) | (n/a) | (n/a) | | League matches only. Replaced 18/03/1968, after md 25 |
| Miguel González | Spain | 1968 | 1969 | (n/a) | (n/a) | (n/a) | (n/a) | (n/a) | (n/a) | (n/a) | | |
| Marcel Domingo | France | 1969 | 1971 | (n/a) | (n/a) | (n/a) | (n/a) | (n/a) | (n/a) | (n/a) | 1 La Liga | |
| Max Merkel | Austria | 1971 | 1973 | (n/a) | (n/a) | (n/a) | (n/a) | (n/a) | (n/a) | (n/a) | 1 La Liga, 1 Copa del Rey | |
| Juan Carlos Lorenzo | Argentina | 1973 | 1974 | (n/a) | (n/a) | (n/a) | (n/a) | (n/a) | (n/a) | (n/a) | | Lost against Bayern Munich in a replay in the European Cup final of 1974 |
| Luis Aragonés | Spain | 26 November 1974 | 30 June 1978 | (n/a) | (n/a) | (n/a) | (n/a) | (n/a) | (n/a) | (n/a) | 1 La Liga, 1 Copa del Rey, 1 Intercontinental Cup | |
| Héctor Núñez | Uruguay | 1978 | 1978 | (n/a) | (n/a) | (n/a) | (n/a) | (n/a) | (n/a) | (n/a) | | |
| Luis Aragonés | Spain | 1978 | 1978 | (n/a) | (n/a) | (n/a) | (n/a) | (n/a) | (n/a) | (n/a) | | |
| Ferenc Szusza | Hungary | 1978 | 1979 | (n/a) | (n/a) | (n/a) | (n/a) | (n/a) | (n/a) | (n/a) | | |
| Luis Aragonés | Spain | 1 July 1979 | 17 March 1980 | (n/a) | (n/a) | (n/a) | (n/a) | (n/a) | (n/a) | (n/a) | | |
| Jesús Martínez Jayo | Spain | 1980 | 1980 | (n/a) | (n/a) | (n/a) | (n/a) | (n/a) | (n/a) | (n/a) | | |
| Marcel Domingo | France | 1980 | 1980 | (n/a) | (n/a) | (n/a) | (n/a) | (n/a) | (n/a) | (n/a) | | |
| José Luis García Traid | Spain | 1980 | 1981 | (n/a) | (n/a) | (n/a) | (n/a) | (n/a) | (n/a) | (n/a) | | |
| Luis Cid | Spain | 1981 | 1981 | (n/a) | (n/a) | (n/a) | (n/a) | (n/a) | (n/a) | (n/a) | | |
| José Luis García Traid | Spain | 1981 | 1982 | (n/a) | (n/a) | (n/a) | (n/a) | (n/a) | (n/a) | (n/a) | | |
| Luis Aragonés | Spain | 5 August 1982 | 25 July 1986 | (n/a) | (n/a) | (n/a) | (n/a) | (n/a) | (n/a) | (n/a) | 1 Copa del Rey, 1 Supercopa de España | Lost against Dynamo Kyiv the final of the UEFA Cup Winners´ Cup of 1985–86. |
| Vicente Miera | Spain | 1986 | 1986 | (n/a) | (n/a) | (n/a) | (n/a) | (n/a) | (n/a) | (n/a) | | |
| Jesús Martínez Jayo | Spain | 1986 | 1987 | (n/a) | (n/a) | (n/a) | (n/a) | (n/a) | (n/a) | (n/a) | | |
| Luis Aragonés | Spain | 3 February 1987 | 30 June 1987 | (n/a) | (n/a) | (n/a) | (n/a) | (n/a) | (n/a) | (n/a) | | |
| César Luis Menotti | Argentina | 1 July 1987 | 20 March 1988 | (n/a) | (n/a) | (n/a) | (n/a) | (n/a) | (n/a) | (n/a) | | |
| José Ufarte | Spain | 1988 | 1988 | (n/a) | (n/a) | (n/a) | (n/a) | (n/a) | (n/a) | (n/a) | | |
| Antonio Briones | Spain | 1988 | 1988 | (n/a) | (n/a) | (n/a) | (n/a) | (n/a) | (n/a) | (n/a) | | |
| José Maguregi | Spain | 1988 | 1988 | (n/a) | (n/a) | (n/a) | (n/a) | (n/a) | (n/a) | (n/a) | | |
| Antonio Briones | Spain | 1988 | 1988 | (n/a) | (n/a) | (n/a) | (n/a) | (n/a) | (n/a) | (n/a) | | |
| Ron Atkinson | England | 1988 | 1989 | 12 | 6 | 3 | 3 | (n/a) | (n/a) | 50.00 | | |
| Colin Addison | England | 1989 | 1989 | (n/a) | (n/a) | (n/a) | (n/a) | (n/a) | (n/a) | (n/a) | | |
| Antonio Briones | Spain | 1989 | 1989 | (n/a) | (n/a) | (n/a) | (n/a) | (n/a) | (n/a) | (n/a) | | |
| Javier Clemente | Spain | 1 July 1989 | 27 February 1990 | 32 | 15 | 8 | 9 | (n/a) | (n/a) | 46.88 | | |
| Antonio Briones | Spain | 1990 | 1990 | (n/a) | (n/a) | (n/a) | (n/a) | (n/a) | (n/a) | (n/a) | | |
| Joaquín Peiró | Spain | 1 February 1990 | 30 June 1990 | (n/a) | (n/a) | (n/a) | (n/a) | (n/a) | (n/a) | (n/a) | | |
| Iselín Santos Ovejero | Argentina | 1990 | 1990 | (n/a) | (n/a) | (n/a) | (n/a) | (n/a) | (n/a) | (n/a) | 1 Copa del Rey | |
| Tomislav Ivić | Yugoslavia | 1990 | 1991 | (n/a) | (n/a) | (n/a) | (n/a) | (n/a) | (n/a) | (n/a) | | |
| Luis Aragonés | Spain | 10 June 1991 | 31 January 1993 | (n/a) | (n/a) | (n/a) | (n/a) | (n/a) | (n/a) | (n/a) | 1 Copa del Rey, 1 Iberian Cup | |
| Ramón Heredia | Argentina | 1993 | 1993 | (n/a) | (n/a) | (n/a) | (n/a) | (n/a) | (n/a) | (n/a) | | |
| Jair Pereira | Brazil | 1993 | 1993 | (n/a) | (n/a) | (n/a) | (n/a) | (n/a) | (n/a) | (n/a) | | |
| Ramón Heredia | Argentina | 1993 | 1993 | (n/a) | (n/a) | (n/a) | (n/a) | (n/a) | (n/a) | (n/a) | | |
| Emilio Cruz | Spain | 1993 | 1993 | (n/a) | (n/a) | (n/a) | (n/a) | (n/a) | (n/a) | (n/a) | | |
| José Luis Romero | Spain | 1994 | 1994 | (n/a) | (n/a) | (n/a) | (n/a) | (n/a) | (n/a) | (n/a) | | |
| Iselín Santos Ovejero | Argentina | 1994 | 1994 | (n/a) | (n/a) | (n/a) | (n/a) | (n/a) | (n/a) | (n/a) | | |
| Jorge D'Alessandro | Argentina | 21 March 1994 | 30 June 1994 | (n/a) | (n/a) | (n/a) | (n/a) | (n/a) | (n/a) | (n/a) | | |
| Francisco Maturana | Colombia | 1 July 1994 | 1 November 1994 | (n/a) | (n/a) | (n/a) | (n/a) | (n/a) | (n/a) | (n/a) | | |
| Jorge D'Alessandro | Argentina | 1 November 1994 | 20 February 1995 | (n/a) | (n/a) | (n/a) | (n/a) | (n/a) | (n/a) | (n/a) | | |
| Alfio Basile | Argentina | 26 February 1995 | 4 June 1995 | (n/a) | (n/a) | (n/a) | (n/a) | (n/a) | (n/a) | (n/a) | | |
| Carlos Sánchez Aguiar (int.) | Spain | 10 June 1995 | 30 June 1995 | (n/a) | (n/a) | (n/a) | (n/a) | (n/a) | (n/a) | (n/a) | | |
| Radomir Antić | (Federal Republic of Yugoslavia) Yugoslavia | 1 July 1995 | 30 June 1998 | (n/a) | (n/a) | (n/a) | (n/a) | (n/a) | (n/a) | (n/a) | 1 La Liga, 1 Copa del Rey | |
| Arrigo Sacchi | Italy | 1 July 1998 | 14 February 1999 | (n/a) | (n/a) | (n/a) | (n/a) | (n/a) | (n/a) | (n/a) | | |
| Carlos Sánchez Aguiar (int.) | Spain | 15 February 1999 | 23 March 1999 | (n/a) | (n/a) | (n/a) | (n/a) | (n/a) | (n/a) | (n/a) | | |
| Radomir Antić | (Federal Republic of Yugoslavia) Yugoslavia | 24 March 1999 | 30 June 1999 | (n/a) | (n/a) | (n/a) | (n/a) | (n/a) | (n/a) | (n/a) | | |
| Claudio Ranieri | Italy | 1 July 1999 | 3 March 2000 | 38 | 9 | 11 | 18 | (n/a) | (n/a) | 23.68 | | |
| Radomir Antić | (Federal Republic of Yugoslavia) Yugoslavia | 4 March 2000 | 16 May 2000 | (n/a) | (n/a) | (n/a) | (n/a) | (n/a) | (n/a) | (n/a) | | Descend to the Second Division |
| Fernando Zambrano | Spain | May 2000 | October 2000 | (n/a) | (n/a) | (n/a) | (n/a) | (n/a) | (n/a) | (n/a) | | |
| Marcos Alonso | Spain | October 2000 | April 2001 | (n/a) | (n/a) | (n/a) | (n/a) | (n/a) | (n/a) | (n/a) | | |
| García Cantarero | Spain | April 2001 | June 2001 | (n/a) | (n/a) | (n/a) | (n/a) | (n/a) | (n/a) | (n/a) | | |
| Luis Aragonés | Spain | 25 June 2001 | 22 July 2003 | (n/a) | (n/a) | (n/a) | (n/a) | (n/a) | (n/a) | (n/a) | 1 Segunda División | Returns the team to the First Division |
| Gregorio Manzano | Spain | 23 July 2003 | 25 May 2004 | 44 | 17 | 12 | 15 | (n/a) | (n/a) | 38.64 | | |
| César Ferrando | Spain | 1 July 2004 | 30 June 2005 | 52 | 22 | 13 | 17 | (n/a) | (n/a) | 42.31 | | |
| Carlos Bianchi | Argentina | 1 July 2005 | 12 January 2006 | (n/a) | (n/a) | (n/a) | (n/a) | (n/a) | (n/a) | (n/a) | | |
| José Murcia | Spain | January 2006 | June 2006 | (n/a) | (n/a) | (n/a) | (n/a) | (n/a) | (n/a) | (n/a) | | |
| Javier Aguirre | Mexico | 1 July 2006 | 2 February 2009 | 120 | 52 | 33 | 35 | 182 | 139 | 43.33 | | |
| Abel Resino | Spain | 3 February 2009 | 23 October 2009 | 31 | 14 | 8 | 9 | 52 | 51 | 45.16 | | |
| Santi Denia (int.) | Spain | 24 October 2009 | 25 October 2009 | (n/a) | (n/a) | (n/a) | (n/a) | (n/a) | (n/a) | (n/a) | | |
| Quique Sánchez Flores | Spain | 26 October 2009 | 30 June 2011 | 102 | 42 | 23 | 37 | 164 | 132 | 41.18 | 1 UEFA Europa League, 1 UEFA Super Cup | |
| Gregorio Manzano | Spain | 1 July 2011 | 22 December 2011 | 28 | 13 | 5 | 10 | 45 | 35 | 46.43 | | |
| Diego Simeone | Argentina | 23 December 2011 | Present | 808 | 475 | 173 | 160 | 1,383 | 705 | 58.79 | 2 La Liga, 2 UEFA Europa League, 2 UEFA Super Cup, 1 Copa del Rey, 1 Supercopa de España | Lost the 2014 and 2016 UEFA Champions League finals to arch-rivals Real Madrid |

== See also ==
- Atlético Madrid
- List of Atlético Madrid players
