= Basilio Sancho =

Spanish footballer

Basilio
Personal information
- Full name: Basilio Sancho Agudo
- Date of birth: 2 January 1984 (age 42)
- Place of birth: Madrid, Spain
- Height: 1.89 m (6 ft 2 in)
- Position: Goalkeeper

Team information
- Current team: Rayo Majadahonda (GK coach)

Youth career
- –2000: Rayo Vallecano
- Moscardó

Senior career*
Years	Team	Apps	(Gls)
2003–2005	Moscardó		
2005–2006	Atlético Madrid C		
2005–2006	Atlético Madrid B	2	(0)
2006–2007	Cobeña	8	(0)
2007–2009	Getafe B	50	(0)
2009–2014	Fuenlabrada	173	(0)
2014	Atlético Kolkata	0	(0)
2015	Trival Valderas	6	(0)
2015	Talavera	0	(0)
2015–2020	Rayo Majadahonda	152	(0)

Managerial career
- 2021–: Rayo Majadahonda (GK coach)
- * Club domestic league appearances and goals

Basilio Sancho Agudo (born 2 January 1984), simply known as Basilio, is a Spanish football coach and a former goalkeeper. He is the goalkeeping coach with Rayo Majadahonda.

== Club career ==
Born in Madrid, Basilio represented Rayo Vallecano and CDC Moscardó as a youth, making his senior debut for the latter in 2003. In 2005 he moved to Atlético Madrid, but only appeared for the club's C and B-teams.

In 2009, after representing CD Cobeña and Getafe CF B, Basilio joined Tercera División side CF Fuenlabrada. An undisputed starter for the side, he achieved promotion to Segunda División B in 2012 but left the club in 2014.

In August 2014, Basilio moved abroad and joined Indian Super League side Atlético de Kolkata. However, he failed to appear a single minute after being a third-choice behind Apoula Edel and Subhasish Roy Chowdhury.

On 1 January 2015 Basilio returned to Spain, joining CF Trival Valderas in the fourth division. On 20 May, he signed a short-term deal with CF Talavera de la Reina to play for the club in the play-offs.

On 7 July 2015, Basilio moved to CF Rayo Majadahonda in the third tier. An immediate first-choice, he contributed with 37 appearances during the 2017–18 season as his side achieved promotion to Segunda División for the first time ever.

On 19 August 2018, aged 34, Basilio made his professional debut by starting in a 1–2 away loss against Real Zaragoza.
