= Antonio Acosta =

Spanish footballer (born 1971)

Personal information
- Full name: Antonio Acosta Rivera
- Date of birth: 22 November 1971 (age 54)
- Place of birth: Madrid, Spain
- Height: 1.74 m (5 ft 9 in)
- Position: Midfielder

Youth career
- Alcalá

Senior career*
Years	Team	Apps	(Gls)
1989–1990	Alcalá	12	(0)
1990–1993	Atlético Madrid B	69	(22)
1993–1994	Atlético Madrid	4	(0)
1993	→ Cádiz (loan)	12	(1)
1993–1994	→ Lleida (loan)	9	(0)
1994–1996	Logroñés	20	(0)
1996	Sestao	13	(2)
1996–1997	Getafe	32	(5)
1997–1998	Antwerp	12	(0)
1999–2000	Coslada	17	(1)
2000–2001	Alcalá		
2001–2002	Moscardó		
2002	Cobeña		
Total		200+	(31+)

International career
1991	Spain U19	4	(0)
1991	Spain U20	3	(0)
1992–1994	Spain U21	16	(3)

Managerial career
- 2004–2006: Poli Ejido (assistant)
- 2008–2009: Alcalá (youth)
- 2009: Alcalá (youth)
- 2009–2011: Alcalá
- 2012: Toledo
- 2012–2013: Alcalá
- 2017–2018: Azuqueca
Medal record
Men's football
Representing Spain
UEFA European Under-21 Championship
Bronze medal – third place	1994 France
- * Club domestic league appearances and goals

Antonio Acosta Rivera (born 22 November 1971 in Madrid) is a Spanish former professional footballer who played as a midfielder. He was also a manager.

== Honours ==
Spain U21

- UEFA European Under-21 Championship third place: 1994
