= Emilio Cruz =

Emilio Cruz may refer to:

- Emilio Cruz (cyclist) (born 1936), Spanish racing cyclist
- Emilio Cruz (artist) (1938–2004), American artist
- Emilio Cruz (footballer) (born 1953), Spanish footballer and football manager
