= Manuel Romero (footballer) =

Spanish footballer (1950–2020)

Manolo Romero
Personal information
- Full name: Manuel Romero Paz
- Date of birth: 28 May 1950
- Place of birth: Madrid, Spain
- Date of death: 23 November 2020 (aged 70)
- Place of death: Torrejón de Ardoz, Spain
- Position: Midfielder

Youth career
- Real Madrid

Senior career*
Years	Team	Apps	(Gls)
1972–1976	Pegaso	66	(17)
1974–1975	Torrejón	34	(1)
1975–1976	Pegaso	31	(18)
1976–1978	Getafe Deportivo	38	(7)
1978–1979	Salamanca	1	(0)
1979–1980	Palencia	0	(0)
1980	Badajoz	3	(0)
1980–1981	Gimnástica Arandina	9	(2)
- Toledo
- Pegaso
- Torrejón

Managerial career
- Alcalá (youth)
- 1993: Tomelloso
- Vicálvaro
- 1998–1999: Coslada
- 1999: Rayo Vallecano B
- 2002–2003: Alcorcón
- 2003–2004: Cobeña
- 2004–2005: Atlético Madrid (youth)
- 2005–2006: Atlético Madrid C
- 2006: Atlético Madrid B (interim)
- 2006–2007: Atlético Madrid B (assistant)
- * Club domestic league appearances and goals

Manuel "Manolo" Romero Paz (28 May 1950 – 23 November 2020) was a Spanish footballer who played as a midfielder, and a manager.

== Playing career ==
Born in Madrid, Romero's first professional club was Getafe Deportivo, in Segunda División. He made his debut for the club on 5 September 1976, starting in a 2–3 away loss against CF Calvo Sotelo, and scored his first goal on 31 October, netting the last in a 1–1 draw at UE Sant Andreu.

In the 1978 summer Romero moved to UD Salamanca in La Liga. He made his debut in the main category only on 6 May of the following year, starting in a 1–3 home loss against Real Sociedad.

Romero joined Palencia CF in 1979, but made no appearances for the side.

== Managerial career ==
Romero made his managerial debuts with Tomelloso CF in the 1993–94 campaign, in Segunda División B. He only returned to that category in 2002, after being appointed manager of AD Alcorcón.

After a spell at CD Cobeña, Romero joined Atlético Madrid's setup: after a year in charge of the Juvenil squad, he was named manager of the C-team in Tercera División, being later an interim manager and an assistant of the reserves.

== Death ==
Romero died on 23 November 2020, aged 70.
