= Javier Cappelletti =

Argentinian footballer (born 1976)

Personal information
- Full name: Javier Iván Cappelletti
- Date of birth: 25 October 1976 (age 50)
- Place of birth: Argentina
- Position: Midfielder

Senior career*
Years	Team	Apps	(Gls)
1997-2002	Rosario Central		
2002	Atlético Junior		
2003-2004	Talleres de Córdoba		
2004	Livingston	0	(0)
2004	CD Cobeña		
2005	C.S.D. Municipal		
2005-2006	Comisión de Actividades Infantiles		
2007	Independiente Rivadavia		
2008	Central Córdoba de Rosario		
2008-2009	Guaraní Antonio Franco		
2009	Polisportiva Pisticci		
2010	Casertana		
2010	Castellana Calcio		
- * Club domestic league appearances and goals as of 17:00, 5 November 2022 (UTC)

Javier Cappelletti (born 25 October 1976) is a former Argentinian professional footballer who played as a midfielder.

== Club career ==
He made his debut for Rosario Central on 13 July 1997 in a match against Club Atlético Huracán. With the arrival of Edgardo Bauza as coach in 1998, Cappelletti began to have greater participation as a starter, most notably his performances between 1999 and 2000. Towards the end of Bauza's spell as manager, Cappelletti was not a regular starter until the arrival of César Luis Menotti, who included him in most of the matches in the second half of the 2002 Clausura Tournament. He totaled 115 matches and scored 4 goals for Rosario Central, two of them against Brazilian teams: Sport Club Corinthians Paulista in the 2000 Copa Libertadores and San Pablo in the Copa Mercosur.

In 2002, he signed for Atlético Junior. After six months in Colombia, he signed for Talleres de Córdoba.

After briefly playing in Scotland and Spain, he signed for C.S.D. Municipal.

Cappelletti played in Argentina and Italy in the latter stages of his career.
