= Hanta-ji =

- 繁多寺
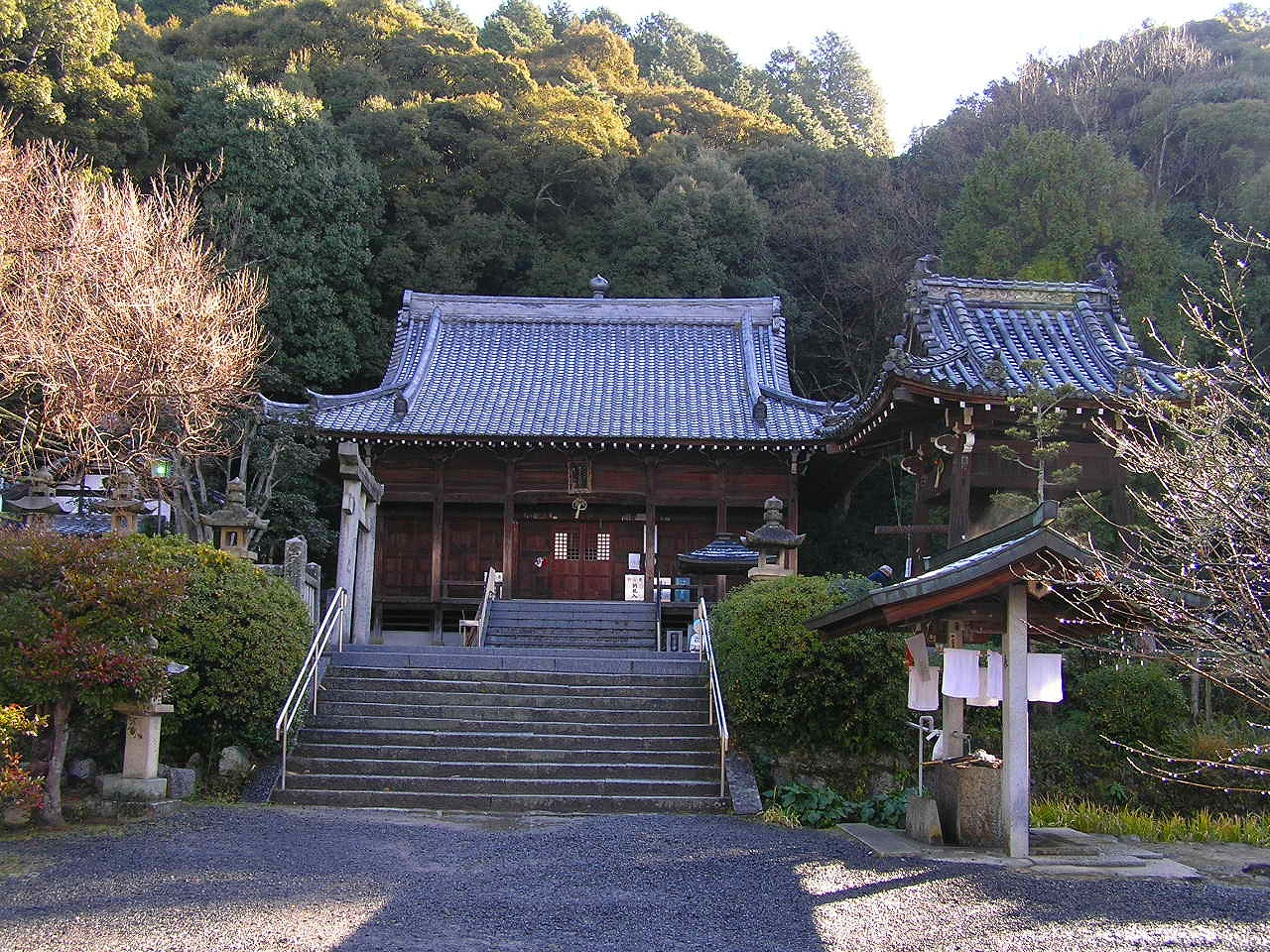

Religion
- Affiliation: Buddhism other_info =: Sect: [[{{{sect}}}]]

Location
- Country: Japan
- Interactive map of Hanta-ji

Hanta-ji (Japanese: 繁多寺) is a temple belonging to the Buzan branch of the Shingon school, located in Hatadera-cho, Matsuyama City, Ehime Prefecture. Its formal mountain name is Higashiyama, and its hall name is Rurikō-in. Its principal deity is Yakushi Nyorai (the Medicine Buddha). It serves as the 50th temple on the Shikoku Pilgrimage.

- Mantra of the Principal Deity: Om koro-koro sendari-matōgi sowaka
- Pilgrim's Hymn: Though your worldly cares may be manifold, do not grow lax; pray with hope that all manner of illnesses may be dispelled.

== Overview ==
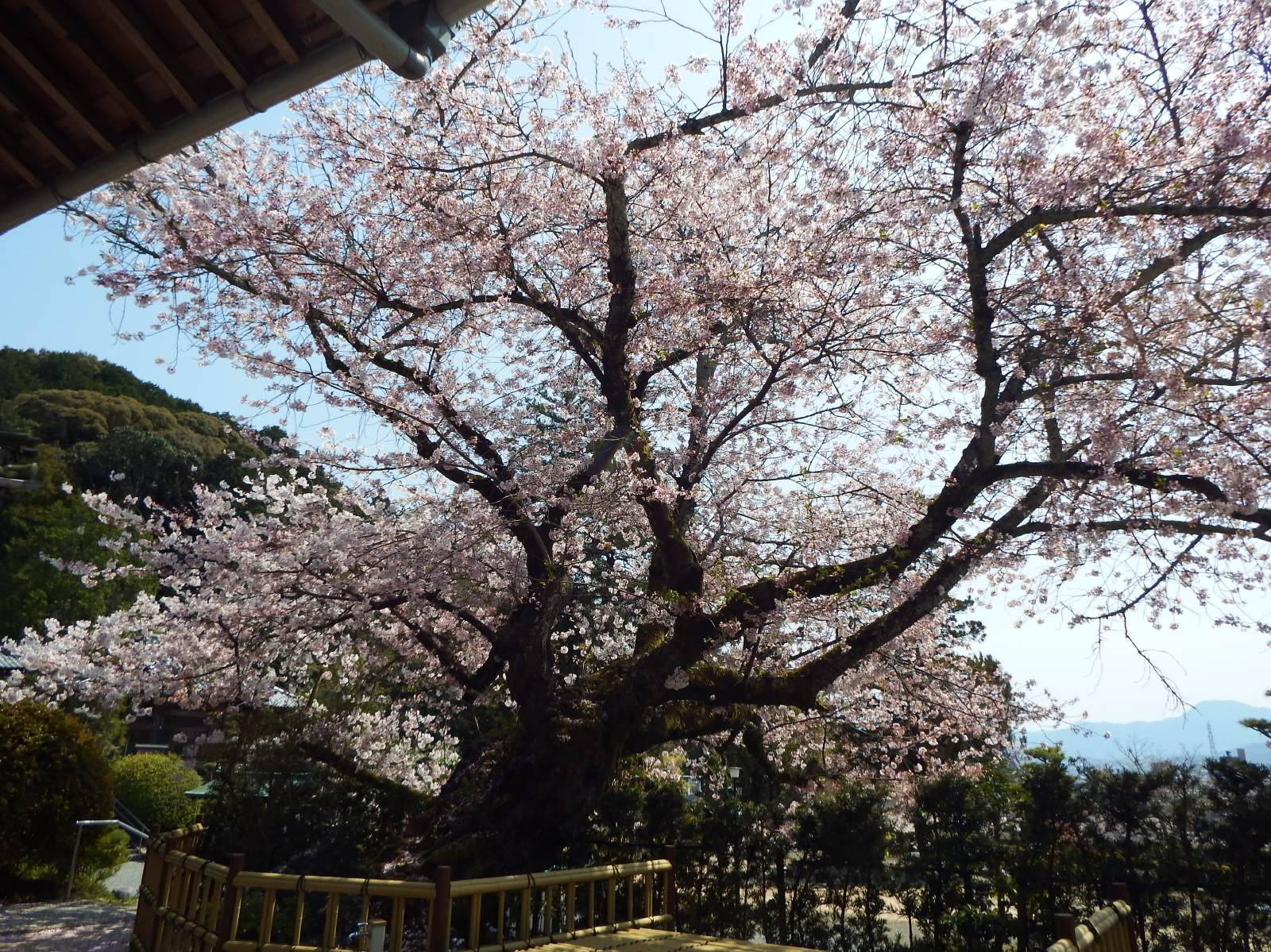
An ancient Somei Yoshino cherry tree

Situated on the middle slopes of Awajigatōge—a peak overlooking Matsuyama City—the temple grounds feature retention ponds located both in front of the Sanmon (main gate) and along the western perimeter. The site offers magnificent panoramic views to the west and south, allowing visitors to look down upon Matsuyama Castle and even the Seto Inland Sea, while the area behind the temple is lush with dense foliage. The surroundings of the temple grounds have been designated as a Protected Scenic Woodland Area, and the site is renowned as a prime spot for viewing cherry blossoms, wisteria, and the vibrant autumn foliage. As the temple belongs to the Buzan School of Shingon Buddhism, a bronze statue of Kōgyō Daishi stands prominently in front of the Daishi-dō (Great Master Hall).

== History ==
According to temple tradition, during the Tenpyō-Shōhō era (749–757), the temple was founded by Gyōki at the behest of Empress Kōken, subsequently becoming an Imperial Prayer Temple (Chokugan-sho) under her patronage. At that time, Gyōki carved a statue of the Tathagata (Buddha) with a seated height of three *shaku* to serve as the principal image (honzon), and the temple was named Kōmyō-ji. Later, during the Kōnin era (810–824), Kūkai (Kōbō-Daishi) stayed at the temple to undergo spiritual training; it is said that he subsequently renamed it Higashiyama Hanta-ji—the mountain name (sangō) and temple name by which it is known today.

Although the temple fell into decline for a time, it was later restored by Minamoto no Yoriyoshi. In the second year of the Kōan era (1279), the priest Mongetsu performed prayers at the temple on behalf of Emperor Go-Uda. It is also said that Ippen Shōnin undertook his religious studies and training at this temple. Later, traveling as a "wandering saint" (Suteshijō), Ippen Shōnin dedicated the Three Sutras (Sanbu-kyō) in the first year of the Shōō era (1288) to commemorate his late father, Nyobutsu.

In the first year of the Ōei era (1394), Kaio, the 26th abbot of Sennyū-ji Temple in Kyoto, assumed the position of the 7th chief priest of Hanta-ji at the command of Emperor Go-Komatsu. Subsequently, a succession of eminent priests served as chief priests, including Chōko, who served during the Tenna era (1681–1684). Chōko garnered the patronage of the Tokugawa family, leading to the enshrinement of Kankiten—one of the three personal devotional images (nenji-butsu) of the fourth Tokugawa Shogun, Ietsuna—within the temple precincts. Thanks to the patronage of the Shogunal family, the temple reached the zenith of its prosperity for a time, growing into a massive religious complex comprising 66 sub-temples (bō) and over 100 branch temples (matsuji).

== Temple Grounds ==
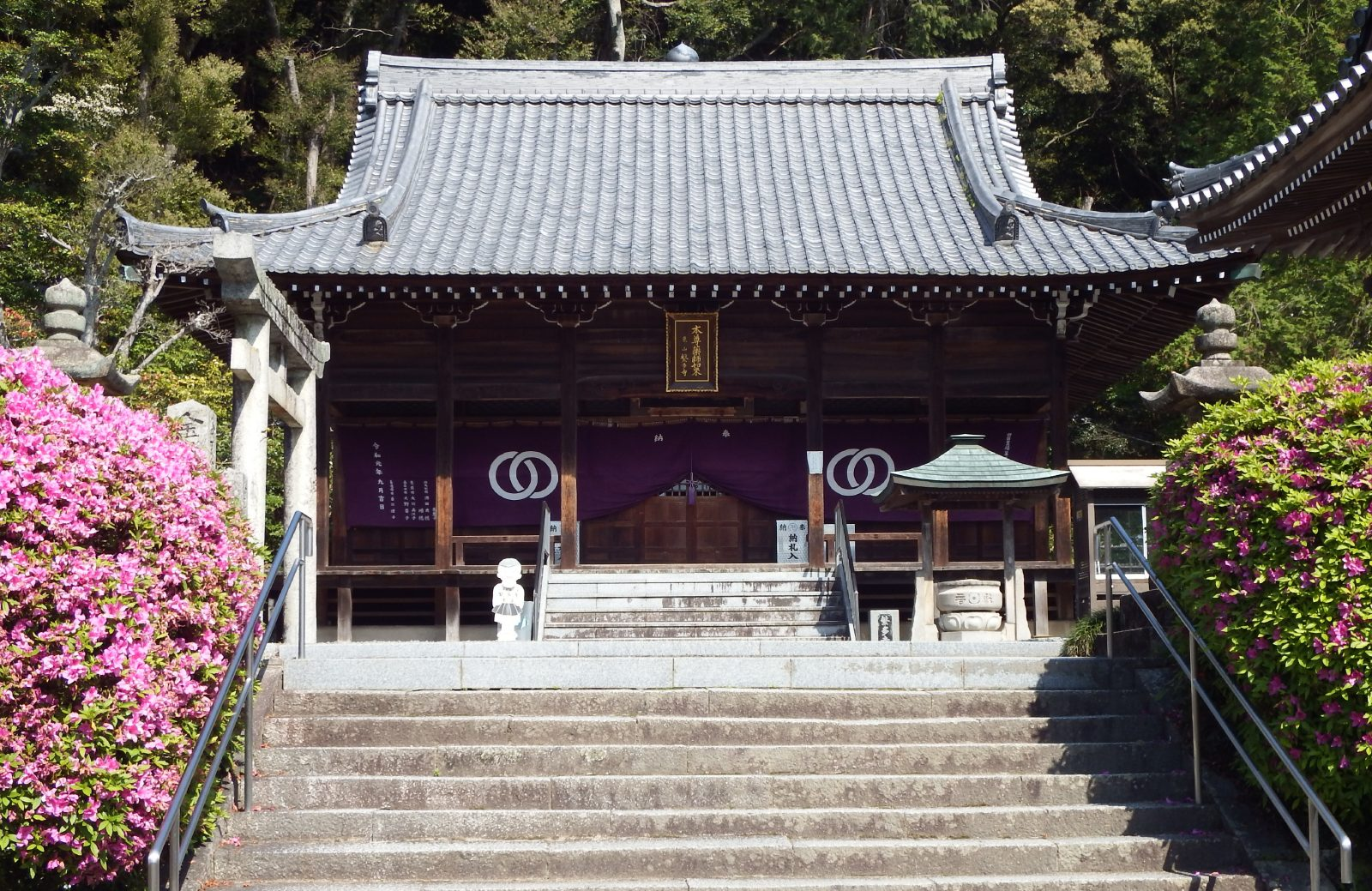
Main Hall

- Sanmon (Main Gate)
- Hondo (Main Hall): Structured with a rear annex added to the front sanctuary, creating a deeper interior space. It houses a seated statue of Yakushi Nyorai (the Medicine Buddha)—which is not open to public viewing—flanked by the Bodhisattvas Nikko (Sunlight) and Gekko (Moonlight). A half-seated statue of Jizo Bodhisattva is visible in the side chamber to the left.
- Daishido (Founder's Hall): Equipped with a motion sensor that illuminates the statue of the Great Master whenever a worshiper enters. To the left stands a statue of Monk Mongetsu, the temple's restorer.
- Shoro (Bell Tower): Houses a temple bell donated by devotees in Genroku 9 (1696). The ceiling features paintings depicting motifs from China's "Twenty-Four Paragons of Filial Piety."
- Kankiten-do (Hall of Kankiten): Enshrines Kankiten (a strictly private deity never shown to the public), one of three personal devotional images owned by the fourth Shogun, Tokugawa Ietsuna. It attracts many worshipers seeking protection from misfortune, business prosperity, and success in academic examinations. Rebuilt in Heisei 18 (2006).
- Bishamonten-do (Hall of Bishamonten)
- Benzaiten-sha (Shrine of Benzaiten)
- Jizodo (Hall of Jizo): A small structure housing six stone Buddha statues. Upon entering through the Sanmon, the Jizodo and the Kuri (temple kitchen/office)—which also serves as the Nokyosho (sutra-stamping office)—are located to the left; further ahead lies a small pond and the Benzaiten-sha. A Temizuya (purification pavilion) is situated to the right. Ascending the stone steps, the Shoro stands to the right, while the Hondo rises at the back of the grounds. To the left of the Hondo is the smaller Bishamonten-do; to the front-left stands a stone *torii* gate leading to the Kankiten-do; and to the right of the Hondo is the Daishido.
- Shukubo (Temple Lodging): None available.
- Parking: Space for 5 standard vehicles and 1 large vehicle (bus). Free of charge.
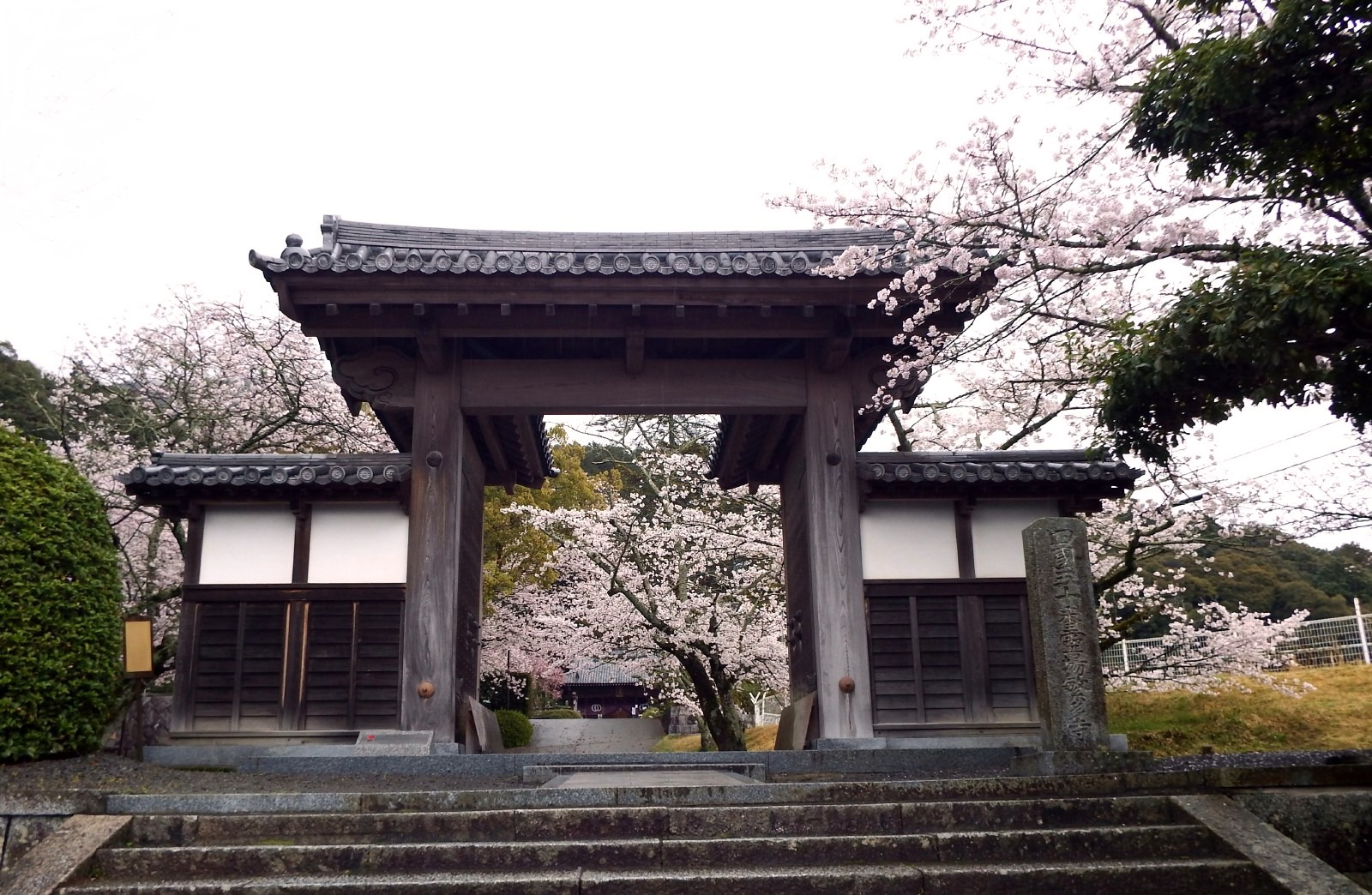
  Main Gate
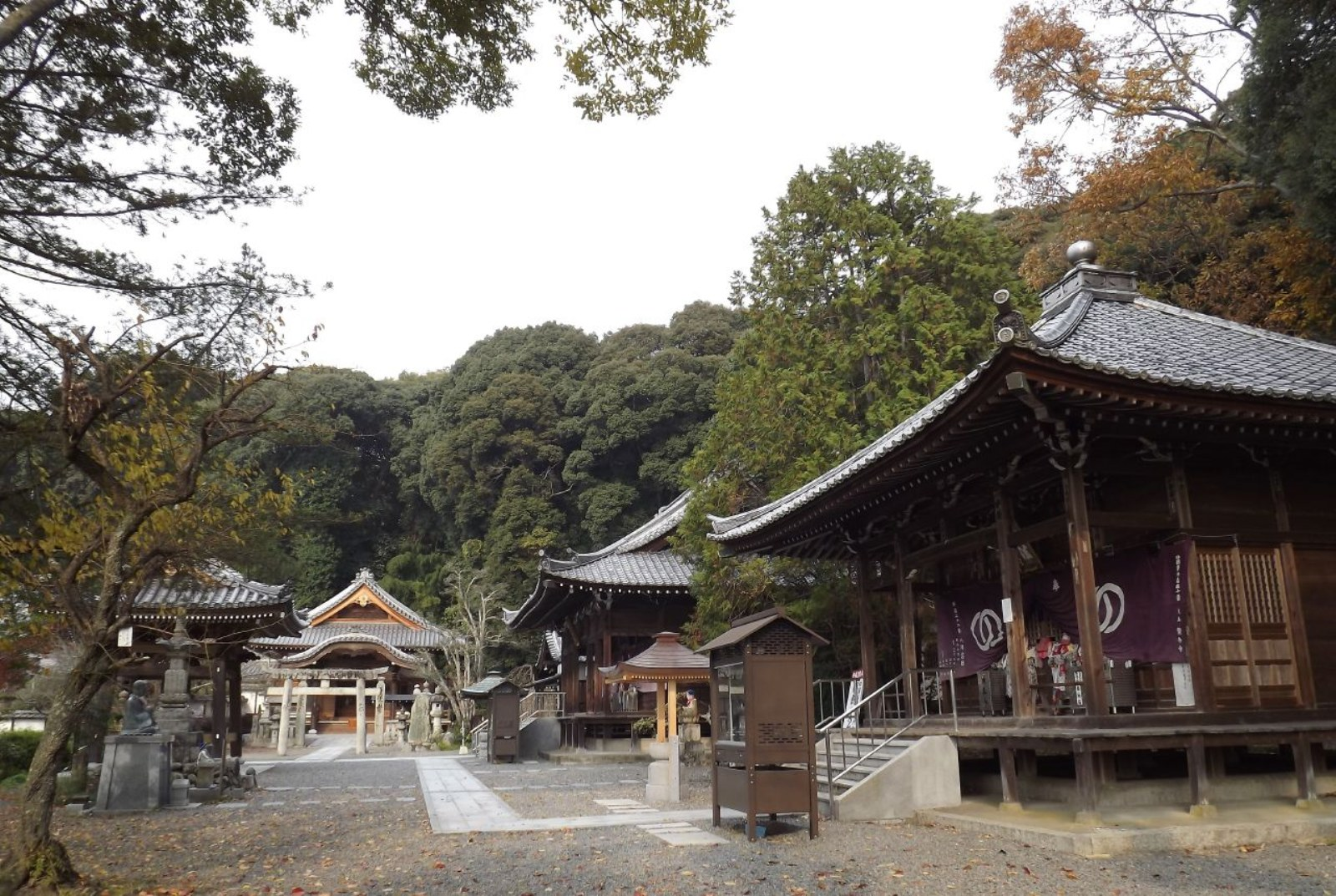
  The Daishi Hall is on the right.
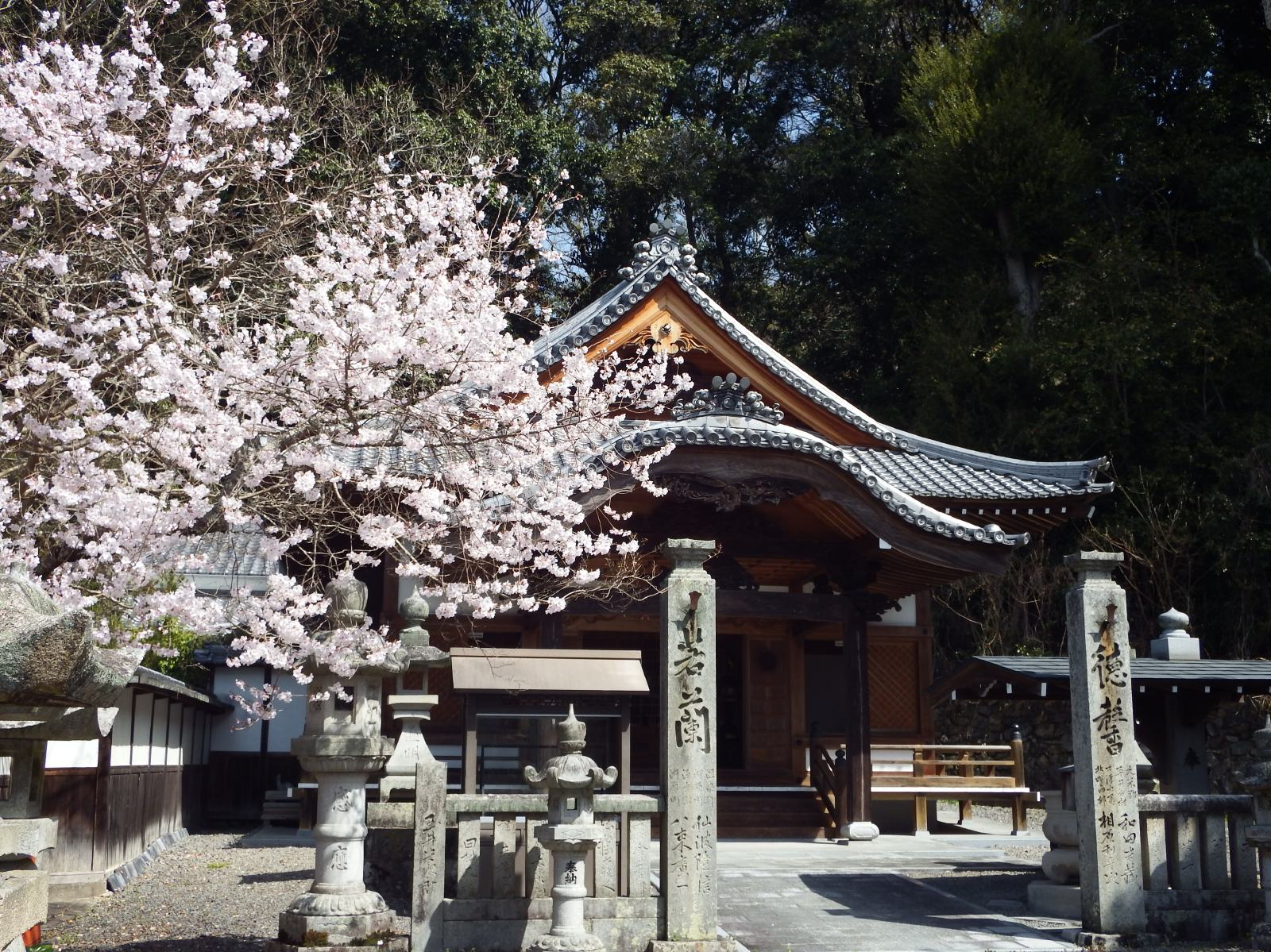
  The Kangitendo Hall and a Higan Cherry Tree
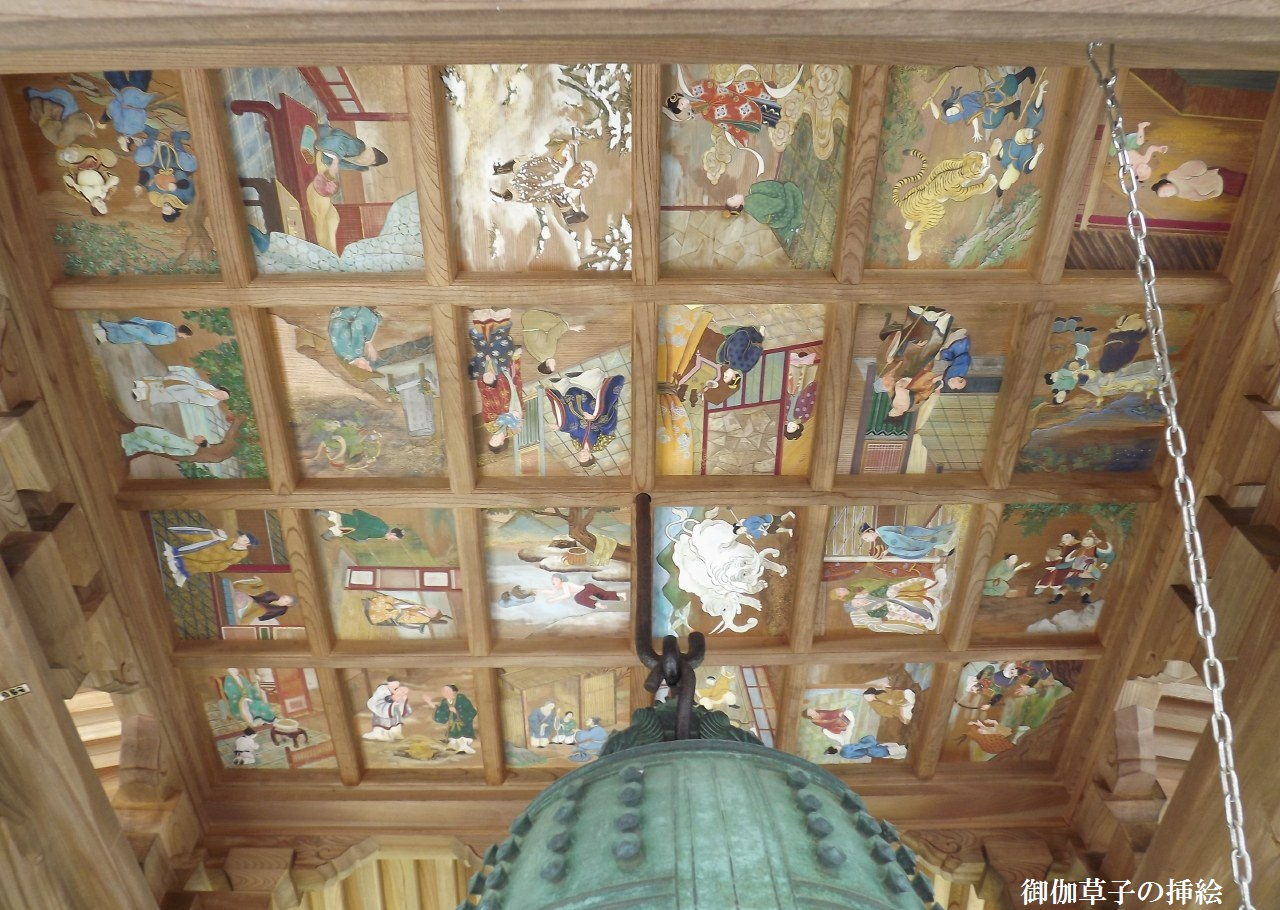
  Ceiling painting in the Bell Tower
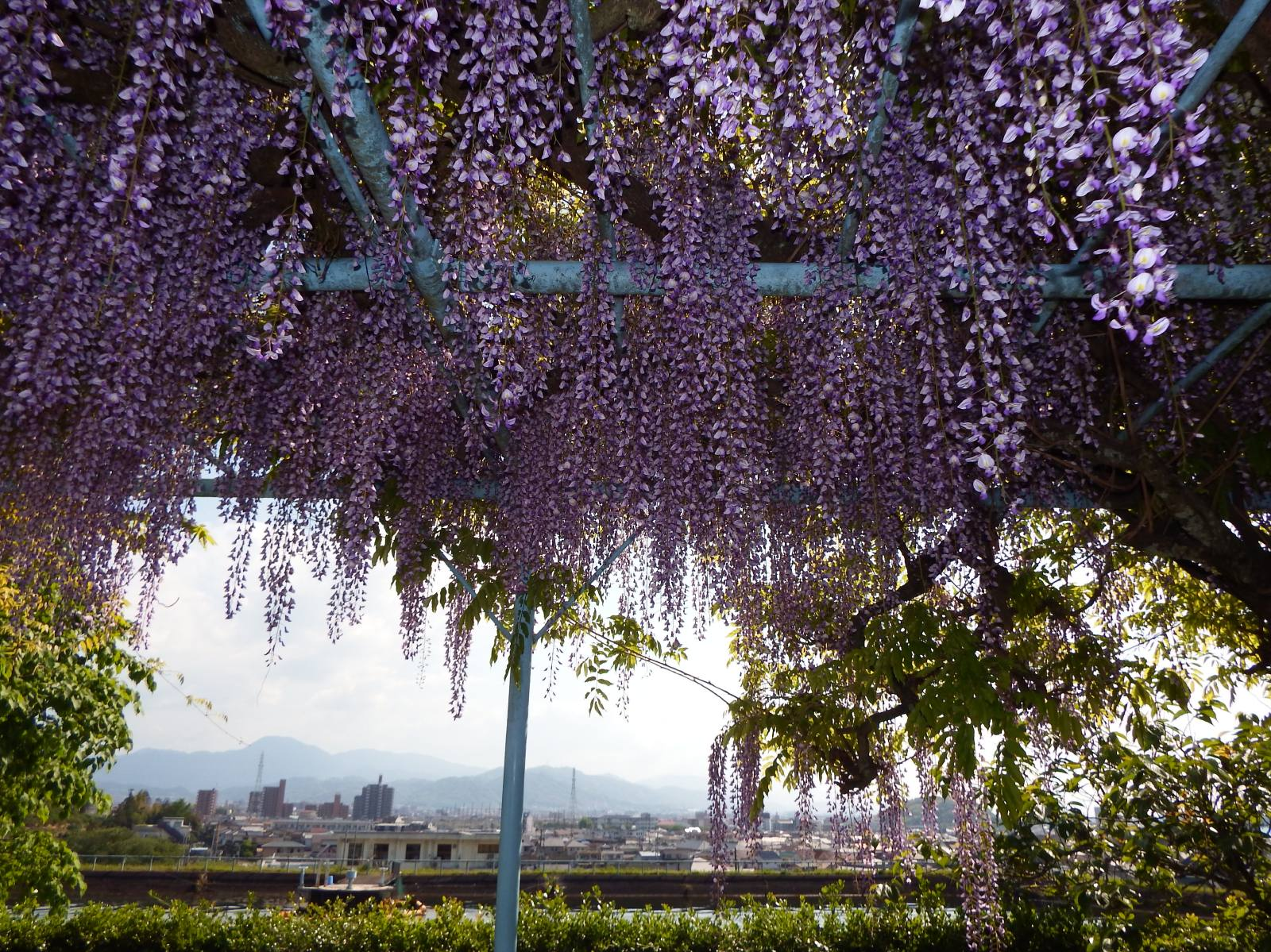
  Wisteria Trellis and Scenic View

== Cultural Properties ==
=== Historic Sites ===
- Iyo Pilgrimage Route (Hanta-ji Temple Precinct): Designated as an addition on October 11, 2024.

== Access ==
=== Rail ===
- Iyo Railway Yokogawara Line – Alight at Kume Station (1.7 km)

=== Bus ===
- Iyotetsu Bus Route 10 – Alight at Hantaji-guchi Bus Stop (0.8 km)

=== Road ===
- Local Roads: Prefectural Road 40 (Matsuyama Eastern Loop Line) – Hatadera (0.8 km)
- Expressway: Matsuyama Expressway – Matsuyama IC (6.3 km)

== Preceding and Following Temples ==
=== Shikoku Pilgrimage ===
49 Jōdo-ji --(1.7 km)-- 50 Hanta-ji --(2.8 km)-- 51 Ishite-ji
*Note: There are multiple routes for the pilgrimage path; the distances listed above are based on the standard route.

== Bibliography ==
- Shikoku 88-Temple Pilgrimage Council, ed. (2006). Pilgrim Guide's Canon. Shikoku 88-Temple Pilgrimage Council.
- Tateki Miyazaki (2007). Shikoku Pilgrimage: Walking Alone, Yet Accompanied by Two. Vol. Map Edition (8th ed.). Henromichi Preservation Cooperation Association.

== See also ==
- Shikoku Pilgrimage
- List of Buddhist temples in Japan
