= Hondo =

Hondo may refer to:

== Places ==
- Rio Hondo (disambiguation), the name of several locations, derived from the Spanish word for "deep"

=== Canada ===
- Hondo, Alberta, an unincorporated community

=== Japan ===
- Hondo, Kumamoto, a former city, merged into the new city of Amakusa in 2006
- Honshū, Japan's main island, historically called Hondo (本土, main island)

=== United States ===
- Hondo, New Mexico, an unincorporated community
- Hondo, Texas, a city
- Hondo Creek, Texas

== Arts and entertainment ==
- Hondo (film), 1953 Western film starring John Wayne
  - Hondo (novel), novelization of the film by Louis L'Amour
  - Hondo (TV series), a 1967 television version

== People ==
=== As a nickname ===
- Charles C. Campbell (general) (1948–2016), United States Army
- Hondo Crouch (1916–1976), Texas rancher-folklorist-humorist
- John Havlicek (1940–2019), U.S. basketball player with the Boston Celtics
- Frank Howard (baseball) (born 1936), U.S. baseball player and coach

=== As a surname ===
- Ammi Hondo (born 1997), Japanese para-alpine skier
- Daniel Hondo (born 1982), former cricketer and current rugby union player from Zimbabwe
- Danilo Hondo (born 1974), German professional cyclist
- Douglas Hondo (born 1979), Zimbabwean cricketer
- Kaede Hondo (本渡 楓; born 1996), Japanese voice actress
- Med Hondo (1936–2019), Mauritanian film director, producer, screenwriter and actor
- Santiago Hondo (born 1974), Equatoguinean former footballer
- Yasuji Hondo (本堂 保次; 1918–1997), Japanese baseball player and manager

=== Fictional characters ===
- Hondo MacLean, a character in the cartoon M.A.S.K.
- Hondo Ohnaka, a pirate in the Star Wars universe
- Piston Hondo, in Nintendo's Punch-Out!! video game series
- Lt. Dan "Hondo" Harrelson, in the S.W.A.T. franchise
- Chief Warrant Officer Four Bernie "Hondo" Coleman, in Top Gun: Maverick

== Other uses ==
- Cyclone Hondo, a 2008 Indian Ocean cyclone
- Hondo (guitar company)
- Hondo Railway, a short railroad west of San Antonio, Texas
- Hondō, the Main Hall of worship of some Japanese Buddhist temples
- HONDO, computational chemistry software program
- Hondo, an eyelet at the end of a lariat rope through which the other end runs to make a loop
