= Torrejón de Ardoz =

- Municipality
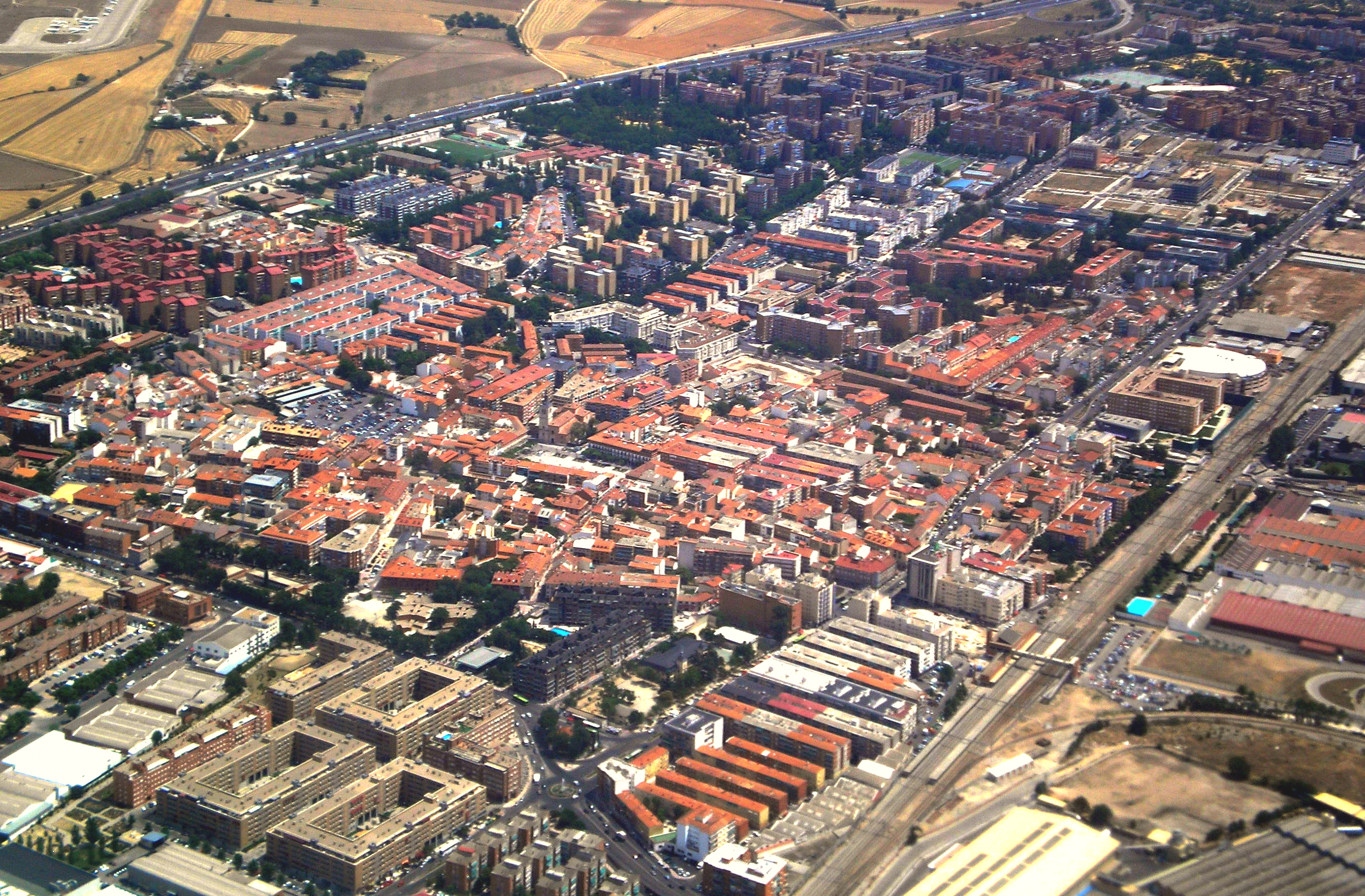

- Flag Coat of arms
- Location of Torrejón de Ardoz
- Coordinates: 40°27′41″N 3°29′52″W
- Country: Spain
- Autonomous community: Community of Madrid

Government
  - Mayor: Alejandro Navarro Prieto (PP)

Area
  - Municipality: 32.49 km^{2} (12.54 sq mi)
- Elevation: 568 m (1,864 ft)

Population (2025-01-01)
  - Municipality: 143,526
  - Urban: 127,132
  - Demonym: Torrejonero -a
- Time zone: UTC+1 (EST)
- Website: ayto-torrejon.es

Torrejón de Ardoz (Spanish pronunciation: [toreˈxon de aɾˈðoθ]) is a municipality of Spain belonging to the Community of Madrid.

The European Union Satellite Centre (SatCen), an agency of the European Union, is located in Torrejón de Ardoz. It is also the location of the headquarters of the Instituto Nacional de Técnica Aeroespacial (INTA), the Spanish space agency.

The Torrejón Air Base/Madrid–Torrejón Airport also lies on the municipality.

== Etymology ==
Torrejón comes from torre ("tower"); the suffix -jón is a diminutive that ultimately makes reference to the small or unimportant nature of the noun. The Ardoz add-on comes from the namesake creek.

== History ==
While there is no certainty of the origin of Torrejón de Ardoz, it probably dates from the 12th century, associated to fortifications built to protect Alcalá de Henares. It was part of the Land of Alcalá for all purposes until 1554, when it was granted the status of town.

In the 16th century, the Casa Grande was built, where several Spanish princes stayed while studying at the University of Alcala.

In 1843 it was the place of a short battle between general Ramón Narvaez and senator Antonio Seoane, as part of the rebellion against Espartero.

The United States Air Force jointly occupied the Torrejón Air Base, installed in 1955, under agreements made with Francisco Franco. The base was subject of criticism since its beginnings and a meeting place of pacifist demonstrations attended by progressives and ecologists.

One of the election platforms of Felipe González's Spanish Socialist Workers' Party (PSOE) was to close the base to the American fighter wing. Once González became prime minister, the lease of the then 401st Tactical Fighter Wing (now the 401st Air Expeditionary Group) was not renewed and the F-16 fighter wing left the base in the early 1990s.

At the end of the 20th century, the city experienced strong industrial growth, which attracted thousands of workers. This led to rapid urban growth.

== Geography ==
=== Location ===
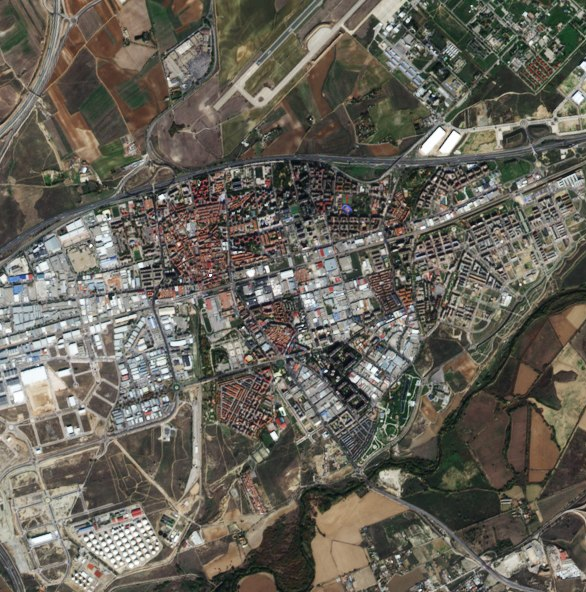
Torrejón de Ardoz as seen by the European Space Agency's Sentinel-2.

It is located to the east of the city of Madrid, near the A-2, the highway connecting Madrid and Barcelona. With the city located at the right-bank (north) of the Henares the relief of the municipality gently decreases in elevation from north to south.

Three small creeks pass through the municipality emptying into the Henares. From West to East: Arroyo del Valle, Arroyo Pelayo, and Arroyo Ardoz.

The highest point lies in the North of the municipality, standing at 623 m above sea level.

The municipality has a total area of 32.49 km^{2}.

=== Climate ===
Torrejón de Ardoz has a cold semi-arid climate (Köppen: BSk) with cool winters, hot summers and precipitation concentrated in the autumn and spring seasons. As in other parts of the east and south of the Community of Madrid, the aridity is notable. Snow, although rare, can occur in some winters.

Climate data for Torrejón de Ardoz 607m (1991–2020), extremes (1951-present)
Month	Jan	Feb	Mar	Apr	May	Jun	Jul	Aug	Sep	Oct	Nov	Dec	Year
Record high °C (°F)	21.5 (70.7)	24.2 (75.6)	28.2 (82.8)	31.7 (89.1)	36.9 (98.4)	41.9 (107.4)	42.4 (108.3)	42.8 (109.0)	40.0 (104.0)	32.6 (90.7)	25.0 (77.0)	20.5 (68.9)	42.8 (109.0)
Mean daily maximum °C (°F)	11.0 (51.8)	13.1 (55.6)	17.0 (62.6)	19.4 (66.9)	24.0 (75.2)	30.2 (86.4)	33.9 (93.0)	33.3 (91.9)	27.9 (82.2)	21.4 (70.5)	14.8 (58.6)	11.4 (52.5)	21.5 (70.6)
Daily mean °C (°F)	5.8 (42.4)	7.1 (44.8)	10.4 (50.7)	12.8 (55.0)	17.0 (62.6)	22.2 (72.0)	25.5 (77.9)	25.2 (77.4)	20.6 (69.1)	15.2 (59.4)	9.5 (49.1)	6.4 (43.5)	14.8 (58.7)
Mean daily minimum °C (°F)	0.6 (33.1)	1.1 (34.0)	3.7 (38.7)	6.1 (43.0)	9.8 (49.6)	14.3 (57.7)	17.2 (63.0)	17.1 (62.8)	13.2 (55.8)	9.0 (48.2)	4.2 (39.6)	1.3 (34.3)	8.1 (46.7)
Record low °C (°F)	−13.7 (7.3)	−13.8 (7.2)	−7.4 (18.7)	−3.2 (26.2)	−1.0 (30.2)	4.5 (40.1)	6.6 (43.9)	6.8 (44.2)	3.6 (38.5)	−2.0 (28.4)	−6.6 (20.1)	−10.2 (13.6)	−13.8 (7.2)
Average precipitation mm (inches)	29 (1.1)	28 (1.1)	32 (1.3)	41 (1.6)	44 (1.7)	22 (0.9)	10 (0.4)	9 (0.4)	24 (0.9)	56 (2.2)	47 (1.9)	34 (1.3)	376 (14.8)
Average precipitation days (≥ 1 mm)	5.1	4.2	4.9	6.5	6.3	3.6	1.4	1.4	3.6	6.9	6.3	5.6	55.8
Average snowy days	0.7	0.8	0.2	0	0	0	0	0	0	0	0.1	0.4	2.2
Average relative humidity (%)	77	68	61	58	52	41	35	36	48	65	75	79	58
Mean monthly sunshine hours	155	172	202	234	288	336	375	344	252	202	153	127	2,840
Percentage possible sunshine	52	58	55	59	64	75	82	81	68	58	51	44	62
Source: AEMET

== Industry ==
The city has had industrial facilities from large companies such as Indra, Alcatel, La Cocinera and Amazon. This growth occurred mainly at the end of the twentieth century, with a sharp decline in the twenty-first century. The city still has 3 industrial estates: Casablanca, Charco de los Peces and Las Monjas. The industrial estate of San Fernando is linked to the municipality of Torrejón de Ardoz.

== Commercial ==
There are 2 large shopping malls in the municipality: Parque Corredor and the recently opened Oasiz Mall. The commercial development of recent years has compensated for the fall in jobs produced in the industrial sector.

== Transports ==
The city is connected to Madrid by the A-2 motorway, and by rail through the C2-C7 Cercanías lines. There are multiple bus lines connecting Torrejón de Ardoz with Alcalá de Henares (824), with Madrid (224 and 226) and with the nearby towns: Ajalvir, Loeches, San Fernando de Henares, Torres de la Alameda and Daganzo.

== Main sights ==
- Casa Grande
- Parque Europa
- Church of San Juan Bautista
- Aldovea's Castle

== Sports ==
The city has 4 large sports facilities: Joaquin Blume, Parque Corredor, M-4 and Las Fronteras. The city has an important futsal team, Inter FS, and it had a famous futsal team, Marsanz FS.

== Education ==
- Torrejon High School

== Famous people from Torrejón de Ardoz ==
Artists

- El Chojin, rapper
- Pilar Rubio, television presenter

Military personnel

- Frederick M. Padilla, U.S. Marine major general

Politicians

- Kate Brown, governor of Oregon
- Glenn Thomas Jacobs, Mayor of Knox County, Tennessee

Sportpeople

- David Andújar, footballer
- Wallace Bryant, basketball player
- Jorge Garbajosa, basketball player
- Guti, footballer
- Antonio Guzmán Núñez, footballer
- Kane, wrestler
- Sergio Mora, footballer
- Mario Rivillos Plaza, futsal player
- Manuel Romero, footballer

Podcasters

- Steve Campbell, Both Down Podcast

Crime

- Patrick Nogueira, murderer. Lived with his uncle, aunt and cousins before his family moved to Pioz.

== Bibliography ==
- Alpuente, Moncho (5 July 1997). "El ruido de la historia". El País.
- Cruz Plaza; García Lledó; Martín-Serrano García (1991). "Torrejón de Ardoz". Arquitectura y Desarrollo Urbano. Comunidad de Madrid (Zona Centro) (PDF). Vol. I. Madrid: Dirección General de Arquitectura & Colegio Oficial de Arquitectos de Madrid. pp. 750–782. ISBN 84-451-0297-4.
- Merino Arribas, José María; Ruiz Esteban, Yolanda; Gutiérrez Torrecilla, Luis Miguel; García Manzanero, Fernando (2004) [1986]. Torrejón, una historia viva (PDF). Ayuntamiento de Torrejón de Ardoz. ISBN 84-505-4177-8.

== See also ==
- Madrid-Torrejón Airport
