= Santiago Martín Prado =

Spanish football player/manager

Personal information
- Full name: Santiago Martín Prado
- Date of birth: 21 March 1955 (age 71)
- Place of birth: Madrid, Spain
- Height: 1.61 m (5 ft 3 in)
- Position: Midfielder

Youth career
- Atlético Madrid

Senior career*
Years	Team	Apps	(Gls)
1974–1982	Atlético Madrileño	99	(25)
1976–1977	→ Eldense (loan)		

Managerial career
- 1994–1995: Amorós
- 1995–1996: Atlético Madrid B
- 1998: Rayo Majadahonda
- 1998–2000: Getafe
- 2001–2002: Toledo
- 2002–2003: Atlético Madrid B
- 2004–2005: Talavera CF
- 2006–2007: Leganés
- 2007–2008: SS Reyes
- 2010–2011: Rayo Majadahonda
- 2014–2016: Casarrubuelos (youth)
- * Club domestic league appearances and goals

Santiago Martín Prado (born 21 March 1955), sometimes known as Pradito, is a Spanish retired footballer who played as a midfielder, and a manager.

== Playing career ==
Madrid-born Prado was an Atlético Madrid youth graduate, and started playing for the reserves in 1974, with the side in Tercera División. He played the 1976–77 season on loan at CD Eldense in the same category before returning to Atleti.

Prado established himself as a starter during the 1979–80 season, contributing with a career-best 16 goals as his side achieved promotion to Segunda División. He left the club in 1982, after two full seasons in the second tier.

== Coaching career ==
Prado returned to Atleti in 1994, after being named manager of their farm team CP Amorós. After achieving promotion to the fourth division, he was named in charge of the B-team, and led the club back to the second level in his first season; in his second, however, he was dismissed in November after only four points out of 30.

Prado subsequently managed other clubs in the lower leagues, being in charge of CF Rayo Majadahonda (two stints), Getafe CF, CD Toledo, Talavera CF, CD Leganés and UD San Sebastián de los Reyes. He also managed Atlético B for a second time in the 2002–03 season, but was relieved from his duties in June.

Prado also worked at EF Atlético Casarrubuelos, being in charge of the Cadete A squad between 2014 and 2016.
