= Aviaco Madrileño CF =

Aviaco Madrileño
- Full name: Aviaco Madrileño Club de Fútbol
- Founded: 1951
- Dissolved: 1970
- Ground: Manzanares; Madrid, Community of Madrid, Spain
- 1969–70: 3ª – Group 8, 13th of 20
Home colours

Aviaco Madrileño Club de Fútbol was a Spanish football club based in Madrid, in the Community of Madrid. Founded in 1951 and dissolved in 1970, it last played in Tercera División – Group 8.

== History ==
Founded in 1951 as Club Deportivo Madrileño, the club changed name to Madrileño Club de Fútbol in 1958, shortly after their first-ever promotion to Tercera División. In 1967, the club merged with Agrupación Recreativa Aviaco (founded in 1962) and was renamed Aviaco Madrileño Club de Fútbol.

In 1970, Aviaco Madrileño was dissolved after being absorbed by Atlético Madrid; merged with Reyfra Atlético, the new club became Atlético Madrileño CF.

== Season to season ==
Season	Tier	Division	Place	Copa del Rey
1951–52	7	3ª Reg.	5th	
1952–53	7	3ª Reg.	1st	
1953–54	6	2ª Reg.	5th	
1954–55	6	3ª Reg.	2nd	
1955–56	6	3ª Reg.	1st	
1956–57	5	2ª Reg.	2nd	
1957–58	4	1ª Reg.	1st	
1958–59	3	3ª	6th	
1959–60	3	3ª	7th	
1960–61	3	3ª	6th	

Season	Tier	Division	Place	Copa del Rey
1961–62	3	3ª	11th	
1962–63	3	3ª	5th	
1963–64	3	3ª	13th	
1964–65	3	3ª	12th	
1965–66	3	3ª	8th	
1966–67	3	3ª	14th	
1967–68	3	3ª	10th	
1968–69	3	3ª	17th	
1969–70	3	3ª	13th	First round

- 12 seasons in Tercera División
