= LSU Rural Life Museum =

History museum in Baton Rouge, Louisiana

Coordinates: 30.4116°N 91.1157°W

The LSU Rural Life Museum is а museum of Louisiana history in Baton Rouge, US. It is located in the Burden Museum and Gardens, a 400-acre (1,600,000 m^{2}) agricultural research experiment station, and is operated under the aegis of Louisiana State University. As a state with a diverse cultural ancestry, Louisiana has natives of French, Spanish, Native American, German, African, Acadian, and Anglo American heritage. Guided tours are available for groups of ten or more and must be booked in advance.

The Rural Life Museum commemorates the contributions made by its various cultural groups through interpretive programs and events throughout the year. The main portion of the museum is outdoors and consists of homes and outbuildings built in the 18th and 19th centuries. This portion of the museum is divided into three areas.

- The Working Plantation illustrates the life of working people on a 19th-century plantation, with a main focus on the lives of enslaved persons. The complex buildings include a commissary, overseer's house, kitchen, slave cabins, sick house, schoolhouse, blacksmith shop, sugar house, church, and grist mill.
- The Southern part of the outdoor museum includes several cabins and outbuildings, including the Neal home, a dogtrot house; the Stoker barn; the Stoner Athens Cabin; and a pioneer cabin originally located in Washington Parish. This section highlights the contributions of mainly American settlers to Louisiana in the northern and central part of the state in the 19th century.
- The Acadian or Cajun portion of the outdoor museums consists of two Acadian style homes, one a replica and the other built by the Bergeron family between 1800 and 1815 on Bayou Lafourche and moved to the museum in 2005.

Additionally, the Barn, an interior warehouse open to the public, houses numerous artifacts from the 19th and early 20th centuries that were utilized in the common life rituals of individuals in rural regions of the state. There is a large collection of farming equipment, tools, furnishings and utensils. The barn was moved to its present site from the Stoker House property in Sabine Parish, Louisiana after it was donated in 1999.

Windrush gardens and a gift shop are on the grounds and open year-round except for major holidays.

== Gallery ==
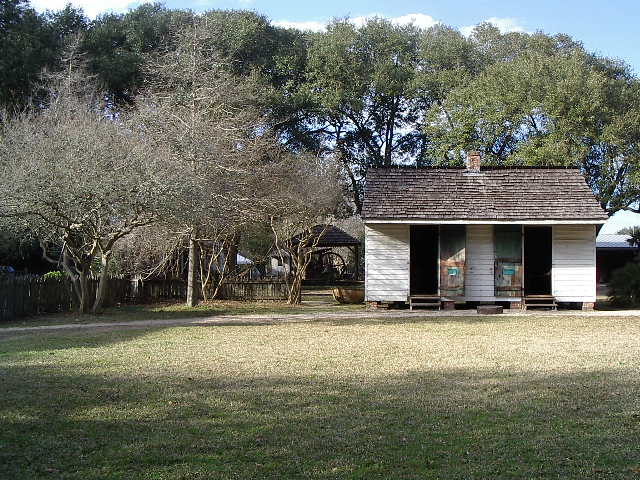
School Cabin

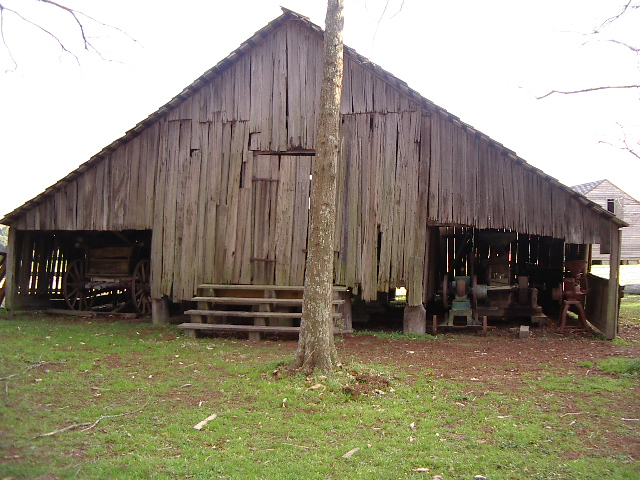
Barn

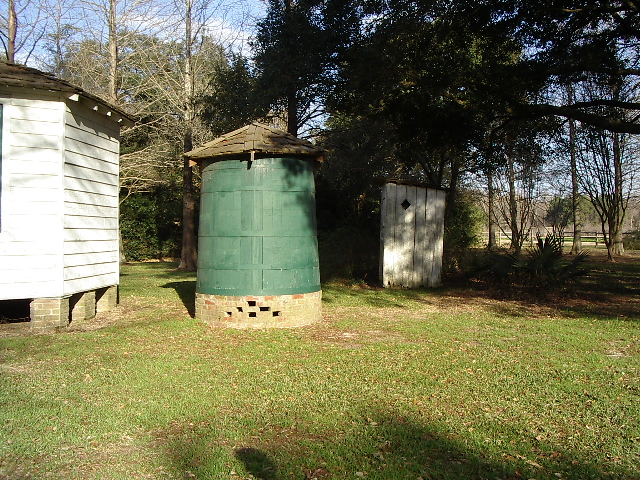
Cistern

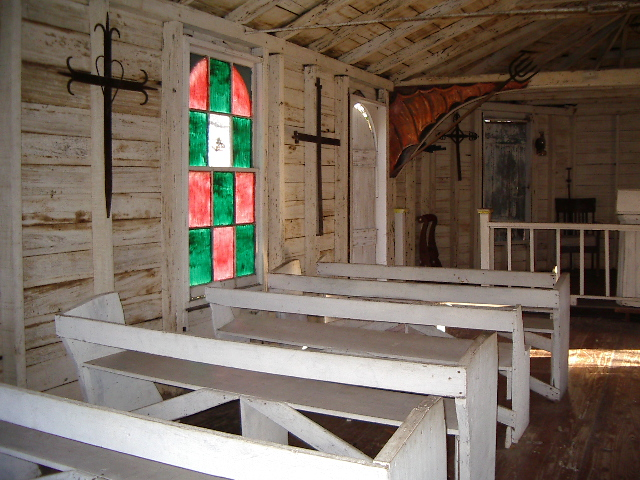
Church Interior
