= Juanín (footballer, born 1958) =

Spanish footballer (born 1958)

Personal information
- Full name: Juan Antonio López Moreno
- Date of birth: 6 October 1958 (age 68)
- Place of birth: Madrid, Spain
- Height: 1.72 m (5 ft 8 in)
- Position: Defender

Youth career
- Atlético Madrileño

Senior career*
Years	Team	Apps	(Gls)
1979–1985	Atlético Madrileño	183	(14)
1983–1984	→ Elche (loan)	30	(0)
1985–1987	Elche	56	(2)
1987–1988	Granada	16	(0)
1988–1989	Albacete	18	(0)
1991–1992	Yeclano	22	(0)
Total		326	(16)
- * Club domestic league appearances and goals

Juan Antonio López Moreno, commonly known as Juanín (born 6 October 1958), is a Spanish former professional footballer who played as a defender.

== Club career ==
Juanín was born in Madrid. During his professional career, spent in Segunda División and Segunda División B, he played for Atlético Madrid's reserves, Elche (two spells, the first on loan) and Granada. He later played for Albacete and Yeclano.

During his spell with Atlético Madrileño, Juanín won the 1983 Copa de la Liga for second level clubs.
