= Torrejon High School =

Torrejon High School was an U.S. United States Department of Defense (DOD) school located on Torrejon Air Force Base in Torrejón de Ardoz, Spain, outside of Madrid. The school's predecessor was the Madrid High School which started in mid-1950s. In September 1959, Torrejon High School opened in a converted barracks at Torrejon Air Base. Several years after this, the high school continued to be known as “Madrid High School until 1971 when the name was officially changed to “Torrejon High School".

In the early 1990s, the U.S. presence on Torrejon Air Force Base began to be phased out. After this, Torrejon High School graduated its last class in June 1992, and the school closed.
