= Mario de Luis =

Spanish footballer

Personal information
- Full name: Mario de Luis Jiménez
- Date of birth: 5 June 2002 (age 24)
- Place of birth: Madrid, Spain
- Height: 1.85 m (6 ft 1 in)
- Position: Goalkeeper

Team information
- Current team: Atlético Madrileño
- Number: 1

Youth career
- 2008–2010: La Chimenea
- 2010–2016: Real Madrid
- 2016–2020: Rayo Vallecano
- 2020: Real Madrid

Senior career*
Years	Team	Apps	(Gls)
2019–2020	Rayo Vallecano B	5	(0)
2020–2025	Real Madrid B	53	(0)
2021	→ Real Avilés (loan)	6	(0)
2022	→ Xerez Deportivo (loan)	13	(0)
2025–	Atlético Madrileño	11	(0)

International career^{‡}
2020	Spain U18	1	(0)
2025–	Spain U21	1	(0)
- * Club domestic league appearances and goals as of 25 May 2026 ‡ National team caps and goals as of 21 March 2025

Mario de Luis Jiménez (born 5 June 2002) is a Spanish professional footballer who plays as a goalkeeper for Atlético Madrileño.

== Career ==
As a youth player, de Luis joined the youth academy of Real Madrid and played for their reserves. In 2022, he was sent on loan to Xerez Deportivo.

== Career statistics ==
=== Club ===
As of 17 May 2025.

Appearances and goals by club, season and competition
Club	Season	League			Other		Total	
Club	Season	Division	Apps	Goals	Apps	Goals	Apps	Goals
Rayo Vallecano B	2019–20	Tercera División	5	0	0	0	5	0
Real Avilés (loan)	2021–22	Segunda División RFEF	6	0	2 (Note: Appearance(s) in Copa Federación de España)	0	8	0
Xerez Deportivo (loan)	2021–22	Segunda División RFEF	13	0	0	0	13	0
Real Madrid Castilla	2022–23	Primera Federación	34	0	0	0	34	0
Real Madrid Castilla	2023–24	Primera Federación	8	0	—		8	0
Real Madrid Castilla	2024–25	Primera Federación	11	0	—		7	0
Real Madrid Castilla	Total		53	0	0	0	53	0
Career total			77	0	2	0	79	0
