= Rio Hondo =

Río Hondo (Spanish for "deep river") or Hondo River may refer to:

== Rivers ==
=== United States ===
- Hondo River (Comerío, Puerto Rico)
- Hondo River (Hormigueros, Puerto Rico)
- Rio Hondo (California), a tributary of the Los Angeles River
  - Rio Hondo College, a college named after the California river
- Rio Hondo (Northern New Mexico)
- Rio Hondo (Southern New Mexico)
- Rio Hondo (Louisiana), a stream in Natchitoches Parish, Louisiana, also known as Bayou Hondo, whose associated Rio Hondo lands, a Spanish land grant, included the Stoker House

=== Belize ===
- Hondo River (Belize), a river which forms much of the border between Belize and Mexico

== Places ==
- Termas de Río Hondo, a city in the Santiago del Estero province, Argentina
- Rio Hondo, a barrio in Consolación del Sur, Cuba
- Río Hondo, Zacapa, a municipality in Zacapa department, Guatemala
- Río Hondo, Los Santos, a corregimiento in Panama
- Rio Hondo, a barrio in Zamboanga City, Philippines
- Rio Hondo, Texas, a township in Texas, U.S.
