= Kenny Kima Beyissa =

Central African footballer

Personal information
- Full name: Kenny Rémy Kima Beyissa
- Date of birth: 5 July 2003 (age 23)
- Place of birth: Angers, France
- Height: 1.76 m (5 ft 9 in)
- Position: Right-back

Team information
- Current team: Olympic Charleroi
- Number: 49

Youth career
- Angers
- Vaillante Angers
- Vannes

Senior career*
Years	Team	Apps	(Gls)
2019–2021	Saumur	2	(0)
2021–2022	FE Trélazé	17	(3)
2022–2024	Cholet II	6	(2)
2024–2025	Virton	25	(0)
2025–	Olympic Charleroi	13	(0)

International career^{‡}
2025–	Central African Republic	6	(0)
- * Club domestic league appearances and goals as of 21 January 2026 ‡ National team caps and goals as of 13:18, 14 October 2025 (UTC)

Kenny Rémy Kima Beyissa (born 5 July 2003) is a professional footballer who plays as a right-back for the Challenger Pro League club Olympic Charleroi. Born in France, he plays for the Central African Republic national team.

== Club career ==
Kima Beyissa is a product of the youth academies of the French clubs Angers, Vaillante Angers, and Vannes. He began his senior career with Saumur in the Championnat National 3 in 2019. He followed that upt with stints at FE Trélazé and Cholet's reserves On 4 August 2024, he transferred to Virton in the Belgian Division 1. On 25 July 2025, he transferred to the Challenger Pro League club Olympic Charleroi.

== International career ==
Born in France, Kima Beyissa is of Central African descent and holds dual French-Central African citizenship. He started playing for the Central African Republic national team in March 2025.
