= Santiago Hondo =

Equatoguinean footballer (born 1974)

Santi
Personal information
- Full name: Santiago Martín Hondo Ndongo
- Date of birth: 4 October 1974 (age 52)
- Place of birth: Libreville, Gabon
- Height: 1.77 m (5 ft 10 in)
- Position: Centre-back

Senior career*
Years	Team	Apps	(Gls)
2003–2004	Cobeña		
2004–2009	Torrejón		

International career
2003	Equatorial Guinea	2	(0)
2010	Equatorial Guinea B		
- * Club domestic league appearances and goals

Santiago Martín Hondo Ndongo (born 4 October 1974), known as Santi, is an Equatorial Guinean former footballer who played as a centre-back for lower division clubs in the Community of Madrid, Spain and for the Equatorial Guinea national team.

== Early life ==
Santi was born in Libreville, Gabon to Equatoguinean Fang parents and have migrated to Spain after a while.

== Club career ==
Santi has played for CD Cobeña and AD Torrejón CF in Spain.

== International career ==
Santi represented Equatorial Guinea in both legs against Togo for the 2006 World Cup Preliminaries. He was also part of the Equatoguinean team in the Mundialito de la Inmigración y la Solidaridad 2010 in Madrid, Spain.

== Career statistics ==
Club	Season	League	
Club	Season	Apps	Goals
AD Torrejón CF	2007–08	12	1
AD Torrejón CF	2008–09	14	0
AD Torrejón CF	Total	26	1
