= Toshio Lake =

Dutch footballer (born 2001)

Personal information
- Full name: Toshio Akio Octavio Lake
- Date of birth: 26 March 2001 (age 25)
- Place of birth: Rotterdam, Netherlands
- Height: 1.75 m (5 ft 9 in)
- Positions: Forward; winger

Team information
- Current team: Beerschot
- Number: 7

Youth career
- –2010: Excelsior Rotterdam
- 2010–2021: Feyenoord

Senior career*
Years	Team	Apps	(Gls)
2021–2022	Fortuna Sittard	11	(1)
2022	→ MVV (loan)	13	(3)
2022–2023	TOP Oss	23	(3)
2023–2025	Lamia	29	(2)
2025–2026	Olympic Charleroi	24	(3)
2026–	Beerschot	3	(1)

International career^{‡}
2017–2018	Netherlands U17	7	(1)
- * Club domestic league appearances and goals as of 16:36, 2 September 2026 (UTC) ‡ National team caps and goals as of 18:55, 15 August 2021 (UTC)

Toshio Akio Octavio Lake (born 26 March 2001) is a Dutch professional footballer who plays as a forward for Challenger Pro League club Beerschot.

== Early and personal life ==
Born in Rotterdam, Lake is of Sint Maartenese descent. His mother lives in the Netherlands whilst his father lives in Sint Maarten.

== Club career ==
Lake played youth football for SBV Excelsior before joining Feyenoord in 2010. He signed for Fortuna Sittard in summer 2021, initially joining their under-21 side. He made his senior debut on 14 August 2021 as a substitute against FC Twente and scored and provided an assist in a 2–1 win.

On 31 January 2022, Lake was loaned to MVV Maastricht for the rest of the season.

On 11 August 2022, Lake moved to TOP Oss.

Lake joined Challenger Pro League club Beerschot on 15 August 2026, signing a one-season contract, with an option for an additional year.

== International career ==
Lake made seven appearances for the Netherlands national under-17 team, and scored once. He made one appearance as the Netherlands won the 2018 UEFA European Under-17 Championship.

== Honours ==
Netherlands U17

- UEFA European Under-17 Championship: 2018
