= Stoker House =

Historic house in Louisiana, United States

- U.S. National Register of Historic Places
- Location within Louisiana Location within the United States
- Location: Natchitoches Highway (Louisiana Highway 6), near Many, Louisiana
- Coordinates: 31.62402°N 93.38518°W
- Area: less than one acre
- Built: c. 1848
- NRHP reference No.: 76000975
- Added to NRHP: June 23, 1976

The Stoker House, or Old Stoker House, in Sabine Parish, Louisiana, northeast of Many, Louisiana, dates from 1848. It is the oldest house in Sabine Parish still at its original site, and it was listed on the National Register of Historic Places in 1976.

The main historic resource is a house originally built as a dog-trot log house built by Riley Stoker and his wife Elizabeth in the late 1840s, built with slave labor. Riley was one of four sons of Henry Stoker and his wife Nancy Varnell Stoker, who had settled on the land in 1818 and had built a lean-to on the listed property, which is less than one acre in area. Henry and Nancy had acquired a large number of acres between Rio Hondo and the Sabine River and had become wealthy.

Henry Stoker was one of about 80 first settlers of the original Spanish land grant Rio Hondo lands in Sabine Parish who filed in 1824 for ownership; legal title was finally obtained by descendants only in 1878. After the death of two of his brothers in the American Civil War, Riley probably bought out the interest of his remaining brother, and in any event became owner of all of Henry and Elizabeth's holdings.

The original house was 54 by 38 feet (16 m × 12 m) in plan. It included two log pens each consisting of a 20 by 20 feet (6.1 m × 6.1 m) front room and a smaller back room; the pens were separated by a breezeway in between. The walls were 4 by 5 inches (10 cm × 13 cm) hewn logs closely fit together and notched/dove-tailed at the corners.

It was built upon heavy sills, built of long leaf pine about 18 by 18 inches (0.46 m × 0.46 m) in dimension and 27 feet (8.2 m) in length, set upon stone pilings. These foundations were, and remain, open to the air.

A later renovation sheathed the walls, inside and out, with 1 by 12 inches (2.5 cm × 30.5 cm) boards.

The listing includes a second contributing building, a barn.

The house is located about 7 miles (11 km) northeast of Many, Louisiana, "on the old San Antonio Trace." It is located on, and is visible from, the Natchitoches Highway (Louisiana Highway 6).

The NRHP nomination was written by Rebecca Stoker Kyle, a fifth generation descendant of Henry and Nancy, who had plans in 1976 to restore the house.

The barn, about 50 yards (46 m) west of the house in 1975, was built at approximately the same time, and is also a double-pen structure built of logs notched together. Its sills were hewn from solid oak logs. The barn was used in support of the property serving as a stagecoach stop. The barn, and Mrs. Stoker, was noted by architect Frederick Law Olmsted (1822-1903) in his book A Journey Through Texas, or a Saddle Trip on the Southwestern Frontier, published after his 1856-1857 trip.

The Stoker Barn was moved from the property and is now on the grounds of the Burden Plantation in Baton Rouge, Louisiana, in East Baton Rouge Parish, in what is now the LSU Rural Life Museum. It was donated by Rebecca Stoker Kyle, her brother James Stoker, and their father Riley Stoker in 1999.

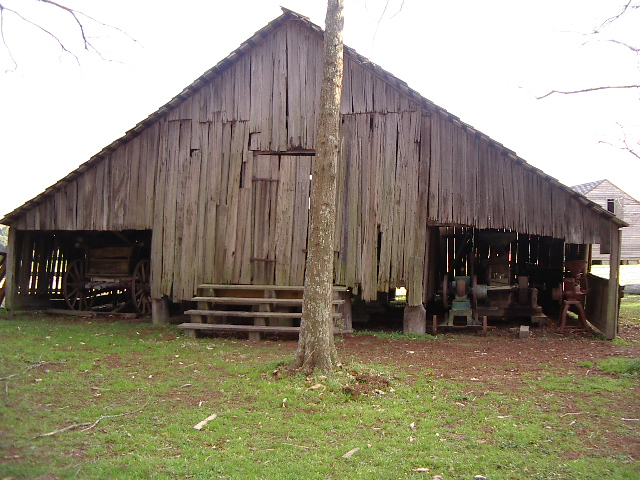
One end of the Stoker Barn, at LSU Rural Life Museum, in 2008
