= Rayan Berberi =

Luxembourgish footballer (born 2004)

Personal information
- Date of birth: 18 March 2004 (age 22)
- Place of birth: Luxembourg City, Luxembourg
- Height: 1.81 m (5 ft 11 in)
- Position: Midfielder

Team information
- Current team: Olympic Charleroi
- Number: 18

Youth career
- –2019: FC Metz
- 2019–2022: Standard Liège

Senior career*
Years	Team	Apps	(Gls)
2022–2024	SL16 FC	53	(1)
2025	Dynamo České Budějovice B	4	(1)
2025	Dynamo České Budějovice	8	(1)
2025–	Olympic Charleroi	24	(1)

International career^{‡}
2019	Luxembourg U17	2	(0)
2021–2023	Luxembourg U19	5	(0)
2022–	Luxembourg U21	8	(1)
2024	North Macedonia U21	2	(0)
- * Club domestic league appearances and goals as of 20 April 2026 ‡ National team caps and goals as of 26 March 2025

Rayan Berberi (born 18 March 2004) is a Luxembourgish footballer who plays as a midfielder for Belgian Challenger Pro League club Olympic Charleroi. He is a former youth international for North Macedonia.

== Club career ==
As a youth player, Berberi joined the youth academy of French side FC Metz. In 2019, he joined the youth academy of Belgian side Standard Liège. He played for the club's reserve team, where he was regarded as one of their most important players. He has trained with the club's first team.

On 13 February 2025, Berberi signed a two-and-a-half-year contract with Czech First League club Dynamo České Budějovice.

On 4 July 2025, Berberi joined Olympic Charleroi in the Belgian Challenger Pro League.

== International career ==
Born in Luxembourg, Berberi is of Macedonian and Kosovan descent and holds Luxembourgish and Macedonian citizenship. He has represented both Luxembourg and North Macedonia internationally at youth level. He first represented Luxembourg, and after two appearances for the North Macedonia U21 team, he returned to the Luxembourg U21 team in March 2025.

== Style of play ==
Berberi mainly operates as a midfielder. He can operate as a number eight or a number ten and is known for his playmaking abilities.
