= Atlético Madrileño =

Association football club in Spain

- Full name: Atlético Madrileño
- Nickname: El Madrileño
- Founded: 17 September 1963; 63 years ago
- Stadium: Centro Deportivo Alcalá de Henares, Alcalá de Henares, Madrid
- Capacity: 2,700
- President: Enrique Cerezo
- Head coach: Fernando Torres
- League: Primera Federación – Group 2
- 2025–26: Primera Federación – Group 2, 3rd of 20
- Website: en.atleticodemadrid.com
Home colours	Away colours	Third colours

Atlético Madrileño is a Spanish football team based in Madrid. Founded on 17 September 1963, it is the reserve team of Atlético Madrid and currently plays in Primera Federación – Group 2. They play their home games at Centro Deportivo Wanda Alcalá de Henares.

== History ==
The club was founded in 1963 as Reyfra Atlético O.J.E. when CD Reyfra (1963–64) and CA Getafe merged. In 1970 it absorbed Aviaco Madrileño CF, which was established in 1967 when Madrileño CF (1956–67) and AD Aviaco merged, became affiliated with Atlético Madrid and in 1970 changed its name to Atlético Madrileño Club de Fútbol.

In 1991, the club changed its name to Atlético Madrid B for the 1991–92 season. Having already played from 1980 to 1986 in Segunda División, the reserves fluctuated between that level and Segunda División B – created in 1977 as the new third division – in the following decades. In the 1998–99 season, the team (which featured Rubén Baraja, future Valencia and Spain star in central midfield) finished in second position in the second division, but was ineligible for La Liga promotion – Numancia gained the automatic promotion slot instead. The following year, they were administratively relegated as the first team that went down from La Liga, and in 2000–01 they missed out on promotion in the play-offs but would have been ineligible in any case as the seniors failed to achieve the same goal (they went back up a year later).

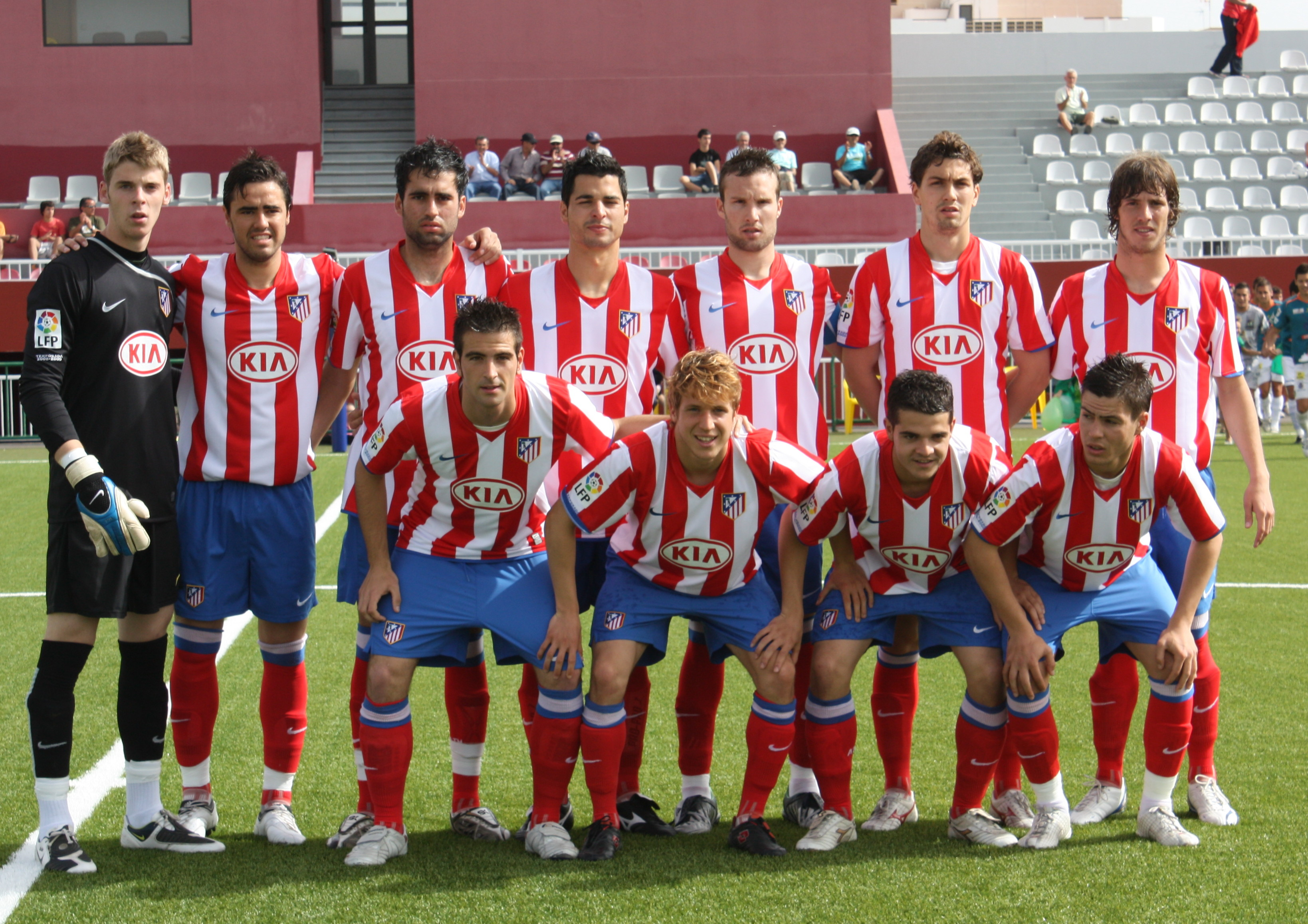
Atlético Madrid B before a game in 2009

The entire 2000s were spent in the third level, but several players continued to make the transition to the first team, including David de Gea, Álvaro Domínguez, Antonio López, Gabi, Mario Suárez, Koke, Ignacio Camacho, Saúl Ñíguez, Thomas Partey and Lucas Hernandez.

In 2020–21, a poor on-field season combined with reorganisation of the league structure meant that the team was relegated not to the fourth tier but the fifth (Tercera División RFEF), having only spent two seasons below the third level since their first few years of existence over 50 years earlier. They returned within two years, with the second promotion via the 2023 Segunda Federación play-offs.

On 1 July 2025, the club reverted to their historical name of Atlético Madrileño.

== Naming history ==
- Club Deportivo Reyfra (1963–1964)
- Reyfra Atlético O.J.E. (1964–1970)
- Atlético Madrileño Club de Fútbol (1970–1990)
- Club Atlético de Madrid "B" (1990–1992)
- Club Atlético de Madrid, S.A.D. "B" (1992–2025)
- Atlético Madrileño (2025–)

== Season to season ==
- As Atlético Madrileño Club de Fútbol (independent club).

Season	Tier	Division	Place	Copa del Rey
1966–67	4	1ª Reg.	2nd	
1967–68	3	3ª	10th	
1968–69	3	3ª	11th	
1969–70	3	3ª	5th	Fourth round
1970–71	3	3ª	5th	DNP
1971–72	3	3ª	3rd	Third round
1972–73	3	3ª	2nd	First round
1973–74	3	3ª	11th	Third round
1974–75	3	3ª	10th	DNP
1975–76	3	3ª	5th	Third round
1976–77	3	3ª	5th	DNP
1977–78	3	2ª B	11th	DNP
1978–79	3	2ª B	10th	DNP

Season	Tier	Division	Place	Copa del Rey
1979–80	3	2ª B	2nd	DNP
1980–81	2	2ª	14th	Third round
1981–82	2	2ª	10th	Round of 16
1982–83	2	2ª	13th	Second round
1983–84	2	2ª	14th	First round
1984–85	2	2ª	14th	Third round
1985–86	2	2ª	20th	Second round
1986–87	3	2ª B	14th	Second round
1987–88	3	2ª B	11th	First round
1988–89	3	2ª B	1st	Second round
1989–90	2	2ª	20th	Second round
1990–91	3	2ª B	8th	N/A

- As Club Atlético de Madrid "B"/Atlético Madrileño (reserve team of Atlético Madrid).

Season	Tier	Division	Place
1991–92	3	2ª B	7th
1992–93	3	2ª B	7th
1993–94	3	2ª B	6th
1994–95	3	2ª B	9th
1995–96	3	2ª B	4th
1996–97	2	2ª	12th
1997–98	2	2ª	9th
1998–99	2	2ª	2nd
1999–2000	2	2ª	17th
2000–01	3	2ª B	1st
2001–02	3	2ª B	10th
2002–03	3	2ª B	12th
2003–04	3	2ª B	1st
2004–05	3	2ª B	6th
2005–06	3	2ª B	9th
2006–07	3	2ª B	14th
2007–08	3	2ª B	10th
2008–09	3	2ª B	13th
2009–10	3	2ª B	7th
2010–11	3	2ª B	11th

Season	Tier	Division	Place
2011–12	3	2ª B	5th
2012–13	3	2ª B	7th
2013–14	3	2ª B	16th
2014–15	3	2ª B	18th
2015–16	4	3ª	4th
2016–17	4	3ª	1st
2017–18	3	2ª B	10th
2018–19	3	2ª B	3rd
2019–20	3	2ª B	3rd
2020–21	3	2ª B	8th / 4th
2021–22	5	3ª RFEF	1st
2022–23	4	2ª Fed.	2nd
2023–24	3	1ª Fed.	9th
2024–25	3	1ª Fed.	7th
2025–26	3	1ª Fed.	3rd
2026–27	3	1ª Fed.	

- 11 seasons in Segunda División
- 4 seasons in Primera Federación
- 30 seasons in Segunda División B
- 1 season in Segunda Federación
- 12 seasons in Tercera División
- 1 season in Tercera División RFEF

== Current squad ==
As of 19 September 2026

Note: Flags indicate national team as defined under FIFA eligibility rules; some limited exceptions apply. Players may hold more than one non-FIFA nationality.

No.	Pos.	Nation	Player
1	GK	ESP	Mario de Luis
2	DF	ESP	Sergio Díez
3	DF	ESP	Javi Gil (on loan from Juventus)
4	DF	HUN	Antal Yaakobishvili (on loan from Girona)
5	DF	ESP	Carlos Giménez
6	MF	ESP	David Muñoz (captain)
8	MF	ESP	Jorge Castillo
9	FW	ESP	Sergio Esteban
10	FW	ESP	Miguel Cubo
11	FW	ESP	Álvaro Santos
12	DF	SRB	Aleksa Purić
13	GK	ESP	Ander Astralaga

No.	Pos.	Nation	Player
14	DF	ESP	Romeo Hueso
15	MF	ESP	David García
16	MF	URU	Thiago Helguera (on loan from Braga)
17	MF	ESP	Álvaro Justo
18	MF	ESP	Taufik Seidu
19	FW	ESP	Marc Domènech (on loan from Mallorca)
20	MF	ESP	Edgar Alcañiz
21	FW	FRA	Issiaka Kamate
22	DF	ESP	Arnau Solà (on loan from Arouca)
23	MF	ESP	Jesús Barrios
—	MF	ESP	Koke Mota

=== Reserve team ===
Note: Flags indicate national team as defined under FIFA eligibility rules; some limited exceptions apply. Players may hold more than one non-FIFA nationality.

No.	Pos.	Nation	Player
26	DF	ESP	Javi Aznar
27	DF	ESP	Jorge Domínguez
30	FW	ESP	Álvaro Vega
31	GK	ESP	Izan Coulibaly

No.	Pos.	Nation	Player
32	DF	ESP	Pablo Pan
33	MF	ESP	David Fernández
35	DF	POL	Adrián Lis

== Staff ==
Position	Staff
Head coach	(Spain) Fernando Torres
Assistant coach	(Spain) Ricardo Ortega (Argentina) Leo Franco
Goalkeeping coach	(Spain) Ricardo Alonso
Analyst	(Spain) Javier Aguirre (Spain) Darío Losada
Delegate	(Spain) Miguel Ángel Gómez González
Fitness coach	(Spain) Luis Piñedo
Club doctor	(Spain) Fabio Andrés Jiménez
Physiotherapist	(Spain) Pablo Caride (Spain) Alberto Casares (Spain) Carlos Brenes
Rehabilitation physio	(Spain) Francisco Lorite
Kit man	(Spain) Saturnino Campo Díaz (Spain) Santiago Álvarez Nondedeu
Technical assistant team	(Spain) Julio Ortega Ruiz (Spain) Roberto Avilés

== Coaches ==
- (Spain) Teddy Pacheco (1969–1970)
- (Spain) José Antonio Olmedo (1970–1971)
- (Spain) Ramón Cobo Antoranz (1971–1974)
- (Spain) Paquito García (1975–1976)
- (Spain) Máximo Hernández (1976–1978)
- (Spain) Joaquín Peiró (1978–1985)
- (Spain) José Ufarte (1985–1986)
- (Argentina) Iselín Santos Ovejero (1987–1988)
- (Spain) Emilio Cruz Roldán (1988–1989)
- (Spain) Josu Ortuondo (1989–1990)
- (Spain) Antonio Seseña Fernández (1990)
- (Spain) Antonio López Habas (1990–1991)
- (Spain) Manuel Ruiz Sosa (1991)
- (Spain) José Miguel Polo Lázaro (1991–1992)
- (Spain) Jesús Tartilán (1992–1993)
- (Spain) Emilio Cruz Roldán (1994–1995)
- (Spain) Santiago Martín Prado (1995–1996)
- (Paraguay) Carlos Diarte (1996–1997)
- (Spain) Carlos Sánchez Aguiar (1997–1999)
- (Spain) Fernando Zambrano (1999–2000)
- (Spain) Carlos García Cantarero (2000–2001)(2001–2002)
- (Brazil) Luís Pereira (2002)
- (Spain) Santiago Martín Prado (2002–2003)
- (Spain) José Murcia (2003–2006)
- (Spain) Manuel Romero Paz (2006)
- (Spain) Alfredo Merino Tamayo (2006–2007)
- (Spain) Abraham García (2007–2009)
- (Spain) Antonio Rivas (2009–2011)
- (Serbia) Milinko Pantić (2011–2012)
- (Spain) Alfredo Santaelena (2012–2014)
- (Argentina) Óscar Alcides Mena (2014)
- (Spain) Roberto Marina (2014)
- (Spain) Carlos Sánchez Aguiar (2014–2015)
- (Spain) Roberto Fresnedoso (2015)
- (Spain) Víctor Afonso (2015–2016)
- (Spain) Óscar Fernández (2016–2019)
- (Spain) Nacho Fernández (2019–2021)
- (Spain) Antonio Rivas (2021)
- (Spain) Luis Tevenet (2021–2024)
- (Spain) Fernando Torres (2024–)

== Honours ==
- Copa de la Liga (Segunda División) (1): 1982–83
- Segunda División B (3): 1988–89, 2000–01, 2003–04
- Tercera División (1): 2016–17

== Records ==
=== Top Scorers (All competitions) ===
Ranking	Nationality	Name	Years	Goals
1	Spain	Juan Carlos de Diego	1988–1990	36
2	Spain	Víctor	1978–1980, 1982–1983	34
2	Spain	Manolo Alfaro	1989–1992	34
2	Spain	Toché	2002–2004	34
5	Spain	Santiago Martín Prado	1975–1976, 1978–1982	32
6	Spain	Marcos Sequeiros	1997–1999	30
7	Spain	Antonio Cuevas	1981–1982, 1983-1985	28
8	Spain	Luis Tevenet	1997–1999	27
8	Spain	Dani Aquino	2012–2015	27
10	Spain	Miguelín	1984–1988	26

=== Appearances (All competitions) ===
Ranking	Nationality	Name	Years	Games
1	Spain	Juanín	1979–1983, 1984-1985	183
2	Spain	Salva Malagón	1981–1986, 1988–1989	147
3	Spain	Ricardo	1990–1991, 1992–1995, 1997-1998	146
4	Spain	Gustavo	1994–1999	141
4	Spain	César Ortiz	2007–2009, 2010–2013	141
6	Spain	Fede Bahón	1994–1998	135
7	Spain	Mínguez	1974–1981	133
8	Spain	José Luis Arjol	1980–1981, 1981–1984	132
9	Spain	Manuel Pinto	1986–1990, 1991–1992	130
10	Spain	César	1992–1995, 1997-1999	127

== Stadium ==
Having spent much of their history playing at the club's main stadium, the Vicente Calderón, followed by two seasons at various local grounds in the Community of Madrid, Atlético Madrileño played at the Cerro del Espino Stadium, located in Majadahonda, from 1997 until 2025. The facility also served as a habitual training ground for the main squad, and as the home ground of local CF Rayo Majadahonda.

In June 2025, Atlético Madrileño changed home grounds to the Centro Deportivo Wanda Alcalá de Henares, playing in the main pitch of the complex which has a capacity of 2,685 people.

== Notable players ==
Note: This list includes players that have appeared in at least 100 top league games and/or have reached international status.

- (Albania) Keidi Bare
- (Andorra) Koldo Álvarez
- (Argentina) José Percudani
- (Argentina) Javier Pinola
- (Brazil) Ivan Rocha
- (Brazil) King
- (Cameroon) Jean Dika
- (Cameroon) Daniel Kome
- (Cameroon) Pierre Kunde
- (Equatorial Guinea) Kily
- (Equatorial Guinea) Salomón Obama
- (Chile) Andrés Robles
- (China) Xu Xin
- (Democratic Republic of the Congo) Cedrick Mabwati
- (Dominican Republic) Manny Rodríguez
- (France) Lucas Hernandez
- (France) Théo Hernandez
- (Ghana) Sadick Adams
- (Ghana) Thomas Partey
- (Guinea) Sekou Keita
- (Haiti) Frantz Bertin
- (Morocco) Yassine Bounou
- (Paraguay) Gabriel González
- (Philippines) Ángel Guirado
- (Portugal) Marco Ferreira
- (Portugal) João Pinto
- (Senegal) Ibrahima Baldé
- (Senegal) Amath Ndiaye
- (Serbia) Veljko Paunović
- (Serbia) Đorđe Tomić
- (Serbia) Zvonimir Vukić
- (South Africa) Quinton Fortune
- (Spain) Mario Abrante
- (Spain) Carlos Aguilera
- (Spain) Manolo Alfaro
- (Spain) Javier Arizmendi
- (Spain) Rubén Baraja
- (Spain) Borja Bastón
- (Spain) Ignacio Camacho
- (Spain) Javier Casquero
- (Spain) Domingo Cisma
- (Spain) José Ramón Corchado
- (Spain) Cuaresma
- (Spain) Pichu Cuéllar
- (Spain) Diego Díaz
- (Spain) Álvaro Domínguez
- (Spain) Gabi
- (Spain) Gaspar Gálvez
- (Spain) David de Gea
- (Spain) Juan Carlos Gómez
- (Spain) Ramón González
- (Spain) Tomás González
- (Spain) Quique Estebaranz
- (Spain) Santi Ezquerro
- (Spain) Chema Jiménez
- (Spain) Roberto Jiménez
- (Spain) Juanjo
- (Spain) Juanito
- (Spain) Julio Alberto
- (Spain) Keko
- (Spain) Koke
- (Spain) Paco Llorente
- (Spain) Antonio López
- (Spain) Juanma López
- (Spain) Armando Lucas
- (Spain) Mané
- (Spain) Javier Manquillo
- (Spain) Roberto Marina
- (Spain) Ángel Jésus Mejías
- (Spain) César Mendiondo
- (Spain) Jorge Miramón
- (Spain) Manu del Moral
- (Spain) Sergio Morgado
- (Spain) Toni Muñoz
- (Spain) Juanma Ortiz
- (Spain) Juan Carlos Pedraza
- (Spain) Rubén Pérez
- (Spain) Julio Prieto
- (Spain) Quique Ramos
- (Spain) Tomás Reñones
- (Spain) Abel Resino
- (Spain) Ricardo
- (Spain) Antonio Rivas
- (Spain) Diego Rivas
- (Spain) Nano Rivas
- (Spain) Joel Robles
- (Spain) Carlos Rodríguez
- (Spain) Juan José Rubio
- (Spain) Miguel Ángel Ruiz
- (Spain) Saúl
- (Spain) Salva Sevilla
- (Spain) Roberto Solozábal
- (Spain) Mario Suárez
- (Spain) Luis Tevenet
- (Spain) Óliver Torres
- (Spain) Martín Vellisca
- (Spain) Higinio Vilches
- (Spain) Clemente Villaverde
- (Spain) Yordi
- (Tunisia) Kader
- (Uruguay) Pablo García
- (Uruguay) Marcelo Saralegui
