= Carlos Sánchez Aguiar =

Spanish football coach (born 1957)

Sánchez Aguiar
Personal information
- Full name: Carlos Sánchez Aguiar
- Date of birth: 28 November 1957 (age 68)
- Place of birth: Madrid, Spain

Managerial career
- Years: Team
- 1991–1994: Toledo (assistant)
- 1994–1995: Atlético Madrid (assistant)
- 1995: Atlético Madrid (interim)
- 1997–1999: Atlético B
- 1999: Atlético Madrid (interim)
- 2000–2001: Universidad Las Palmas
- 2001–2002: Leganés
- 2004: Cultural Leonesa
- 2004–2005: Las Palmas
- 2006: Las Palmas
- 2007–2008: Toledo
- 2014–2015: Atlético B
- 2018: Hapoel Be'er-Sheva (youth)
- 2025: Olympic Charleroi

Carlos Sánchez Aguiar (born 28 November 1957) is a Spanish football coach.

== Manager career ==
Born in Madrid, Aguiar started working as Gonzalo Hurtado's assistant at CD Toledo before moving to Atlético Madrid in 1994. He was named interim manager of the main squad in the following year, replacing fired Alfio Basile.

On 14 June 1997 Aguiar was appointed at the helm of the reserves in Segunda División. On 15 February 1999 he replaced Arrigo Sacchi in the first team, being also knocked out of the season's UEFA Cup shortly after.

On 2 December 2000 Aguiar was named Universidad de Las Palmas CF manager. However, after failing to avoid relegation, he left the club.

In November 2001 Aguiar joined CD Leganés, also in the second level. Roughly one year later he was sacked, after suffering three consecutive defeats.

On 1 December 2004 Aguiar was appointed manager of UD Las Palmas. He left the club in the end of the season, but returned to the Canarians in the 2006 summer; he was relieved from his duties on 1 October.

In 2007 Aguiar returned to Toledo, now as manager, but leaving the club in the following year. On 27 November 2014 he returned to Atlético B, replacing fired Óscar Mena.

In September 2025 Aguiar was appointed head coach of Belgian side Olympic Charleroi ahead of their 2025–26 Challenger Pro League campaign. He left the role in October 2025 following a brief tenure.
