= Emilio Cruz (footballer) =

Spanish football manager (born 1953)

Personal information
- Full name: Emilio Cruz Roldán
- Date of birth: 24 January 1951 (age 75)
- Place of birth: Madrid, Spain
- Position: Midfielder

Youth career
- Atlético Madrid

Senior career*
Years	Team	Apps	(Gls)
1972–1973	Girona		
1974–1975	Huesca		
1975–1976	Cacereño		

Managerial career
- 1986–1988: Tomelloso
- 1988–1989: Atlético Madrid B
- 1989–1990: Atlético Madrid (assistant)
- 1990: Rayo Vallecano
- 1991: Toledo
- 1992–1993: Atlético Madrid (assistant)
- 1993: Atlético Madrid
- 1994–1995: Atlético Madrid B
- 1995: Getafe
- 1996–1997: Toledo
- 1997: Levante
- 1998: Ourense
- 2000: Cádiz
- * Club domestic league appearances and goals

Emilio Cruz Roldán (born 24 January 1951) is a Spanish businessman and former football manager.

== Career ==
Born in Madrid, Cruz started his career at Tomelloso CF in 1986 before moving to Atlético Madrid two years later. Initially a manager of the reserves, he was named Javier Clemente's assistant in 1990.

In January 1990 Cruz was appointed manager of La Liga side Rayo Vallecano, but suffered relegation after achieving only three wins out of 18 matches. After a two-year spell at CD Toledo he returned to Atleti, being appointed manager of the first team on 11 November 1993.

Cruz was replaced by José Luis Romero after eight games in charge, which included only one win. He was subsequently in charge of Getafe CF, Toledo, Levante UD, CD Ourense and Cádiz CF, never being able to complete a season; his reign with the Valencians only lasted five games, with his side failing to obtain a single point.

Cruz subsequently retired from football, focusing solely on his company which was making the security of the Vicente Calderón Stadium during his time as a manager.
