= CD Cobeña =

Spanish football club

Cobeña
- Full name: Club Deportivo Cobeña
- Nickname(s): Cobeñeros
- Founded: 1998
- Dissolved: 2007
- Ground: La Dehesa, Cobeña, Madrid, Spain
- Capacity: 2,000
- 2006–07: 2ªB – Group 1, 18th of 20
Home colours	Away colours

Club Deportivo Cobeña was a Spanish football team based in Cobeña, a small suburb of Madrid.

Founded in 1998, it last played in Segunda División B - Group 1 in 2006–07, holding home matches at Municipal La Dehesa (The meadow) municipal stadium, with a 2,000 seat capacity.

== History ==
Founded in 1998, Cobeña started competing in national categories six years later. On 7 September 2007, the team disappeared due to financial problems, just one year after achieving an historical Segunda División B promotion.

== Season to season ==
Season	Tier	Division	Place	Copa del Rey
1999–2000	8	3ª Reg.	1st	
2000–01	7	2ª Reg.	1st	
2001–02	6	1ª Reg.	1st	
2002–03	5	Reg. Pref.	4th	
2003–04	5	Reg. Pref.	1st	
2004–05	4	3ª	10th	
2005–06	4	3ª	3rd	
2006–07	3	2ª B	18th	

- 1 season in Segunda División B
- 2 seasons in Tercera División

== Famous players ==
- (Cameroon) (Spain) Jerry Kamgang
- (Nigeria) Mutiu Adepoju
- (Spain) Antonio Acosta
- (Spain) Luis Miguel Ramis
- (Uruguay) (Italy) Sebastián Flores
- (Equatorial Guinea) Santiago Hondo

== Notable coaches ==
- (Spain) Alfredo Santaelena
