= List of Belgian football transfers summer 2025 =

This is a list of Belgian football transfers for the 2025 summer transfer window. Only transfers involving a team from the professional divisions are listed, including the 16 teams in the Belgian Pro League and the 17 teams playing in the Challenger Pro League.

The summer transfer window will open on 1 July 2025, although some transfers were announced prior to that date. Players without a club may join one at any time, either during or in between transfer windows. The transfer window ends on 8 September 2025, although a few completed transfers could still be announced a few days later.

== Sorted by team ==
=== Belgian Pro League teams ===
==== Anderlecht ====
In:

| No. | Pos. | Nation | Player |
|---|---|---|---|
| — | FW | BEL | Adriano Bertaccini (from Sint-Truiden) |
| — | DF | SEN | Ilay Camara (from Standard Liège) |
| — | FW | SRB | Mihajlo Cvetković (from Čukarički) |
| — | MF | FRA | Alexis Flips (loan return from Charleroi) |
| — | MF | NED | Cedric Hatenboer (loan return from Excelsior) |
| — | DF | SRB | Mihajlo Ilić (on loan from Bologna) |
| — | DF | GER | Zoumana Keita (from Viktoria Köln) |
| — | MF | NED | Enric Llansana (from Go Ahead Eagles) |
| — | DF | TUR | Yasin Özcan (on loan from Aston Villa) |
| — | MF | CAN | Nathan Saliba (from Montréal) |

Out:

| No. | Pos. | Nation | Player |
|---|---|---|---|
| 4 | DF | SRB | Jan-Carlo Simić (on loan to Al-Ittihad) |
| 12 | FW | DEN | Kasper Dolberg (to Ajax) |
| 14 | DF | BEL | Jan Vertonghen (retired) |
| 17 | MF | BEL | Théo Leoni (to Reims) |
| 27 | MF | ENG | Samuel Edozie (loan return to Southampton) |
| 32 | MF | BEL | Leander Dendoncker (loan return to Aston Villa) |
| 34 | DF | BRA | Adryelson (loan return to Lyon) |
| 42 | FW | JPN | Keisuke Gotō (promoted from RSCA Futures, then loaned to Sint-Truiden) |
| — | DF | BEL | Louis Patris (was on loan to Sint-Truiden, now sold) |

==== Antwerp ====
In:

| No. | Pos. | Nation | Player |
|---|---|---|---|
| — | MF | COD | Jules Ahoka (from Normands) |
| — | MF | KSA | Marwan Al-Sahafi (on loan from Al-Ittihad) |
| — | MF | NED | Isaac Babadi (on loan from PSV Eindhoven) |
| — | MF | ARG | Mauricio Benítez (again on loan from Boca Juniors) |
| — | DF | NED | Glenn Bijl (from Krylia Sovetov Samara) |
| — | MF | FRA | Mahamadou Diawara (on loan from Lyon) |
| — | DF | BEL | Daam Foulon (from Mechelen) |
| — | MF | BEL | Geoffry Hairemans (from Mechelen) |
| — | DF | MLI | Kiki Kouyaté (from Montpellier) |
| — | GK | JPN | Taishi Brandon Nozawa (from FC Tokyo) |
| — | MF | BEL | Thibo Somers (from Cercle Brugge) |
| — | DF | JPN | Yuto Tsunashima (from Tokyo Verdy) |
| — | MF | UZB | Mukhammadali Urinboev (from Pakhtakor) |

Out:

| No. | Pos. | Nation | Player |
|---|---|---|---|
| 5 | DF | BEL | Olivier Deman (loan return to Werder Bremen) |
| 6 | DF | GHA | Denis Odoi (released) |
| 9 | MF | NED | Tjaronn Chery (to NEC Nijmegen) |
| 10 | FW | BEL | Michel-Ange Balikwisha (to Celtic) |
| 20 | MF | MLI | Mahamadou Doumbia (to Al-Ittihad) |
| 23 | DF | BEL | Toby Alderweireld (retired) |
| 25 | DF | BEL | Jelle Bataille (released to Maccabi Haifa) |
| 27 | FW | GUI | Mohamed Bayo (loan return to Lille) |
| 46 | MF | BEL | Milan Smits (released to De Graafschap) |
| 91 | GK | BEL | Senne Lammens (to Manchester United) |
| — | MF | ENG | Kadan Young (loan return to Aston Villa) |

==== Cercle Brugge ====
In:

| No. | Pos. | Nation | Player |
|---|---|---|---|
| — | MF | AUT | Oluwaseun Adewumi (on loan from Burnley) |
| — | MF | GHA | Lawrence Agyekum (was on loan from Red Bull Salzburg, now bought) |
| — | MF | FRA | Ibrahima Diaby (from Paris Saint-Germain U23) |
| — | FW | CIV | Oumar Diakité (on loan from Reims) |
| — | MF | FRA | Edan Diop (on loan from Monaco) |
| — | MF | BEL | Pieter Gerkens (on loan from Gent) |
| — | DF | CIV | Valy Konaté (on loan from Monaco) |
| — | FW | FRA | Krys Kouassi (from Amiens U19) |
| — | MF | BRA | Erick Nunes (was on loan from Fluminense, now bought) |

Out:

| No. | Pos. | Nation | Player |
|---|---|---|---|
| 5 | DF | FRA | Lucas Perrin (loan return to Hamburger SV) |
| 7 | MF | FRA | Malamine Efekele (loan return to Monaco) |
| 10 | FW | BRA | Felipe Augusto (to Trabzonspor) |
| 13 | FW | GER | Paris Brunner (loan return to Monaco) |
| 17 | MF | GHA | Abu Francis (to Toulouse) |
| 18 | DF | BEL | Senna Miangué (end of contract) |
| 30 | FW | BRA | Bruno Gonçalves (loan return to Red Bull Bragantino) |
| 34 | MF | BEL | Thibo Somers (to Antwerp) |
| 76 | DF | BEL | Jonas Lietaert (on loan to Lokeren) |
| 89 | GK | CUW | Eloy Room (end of contract) |
| — | DF | SRB | Boris Popović (was on loan to Arouca, now sold) |

==== Charleroi ====
In:

| No. | Pos. | Nation | Player |
|---|---|---|---|
| — | DF | SWE | Lewin Blum (on loan from Young Boys) |
| — | DF | MAR | Mehdi Boukamir (loan return from Pafos) |
| — | FW | BEL | Antoine Colassin (from Beerschot) |
| — | MF | FRA | Jules Gaudin (from Paris FC) |
| — | DF | MAR | Yassine Khalifi (from Lille B) |
| — | MF | GER | Patrick Pflücke (from Mechelen) |
| — | FW | NOR | Jakob Napoleon Romsaas (from Tromsø) |
| — | FW | FRA | Aurélien Scheidler (from Dender EH) |
| — | FW | POL | Filip Szymczak (on loan from Lech Poznań) |
| — | DF | ALG | Kevin Van Den Kerkhof (on loan from Metz) |

Out:

| No. | Pos. | Nation | Player |
|---|---|---|---|
| 15 | MF | NOR | Vetle Dragsnes (to Brann) |
| 18 | FW | BEL | Daan Heymans (to Genk) |
| 19 | DF | SRB | Nikola Štulić (to Lecce) |
| 21 | DF | CYP | Stelios Andreou (to Widzew Łódź) |
| 29 | MF | SLO | Žan Rogelj (on loan to Wisła Płock) |
| 66 | MF | BEL | Noam Mayoka-Tika (on loan to Lierse) |
| 70 | MF | FRA | Alexis Flips (loan return to Anderlecht) |
| 98 | DF | FRA | Jeremy Petris (to Watford) |
| 99 | FW | FRA | Grejohn Kyei (loan return to Standard Liège) |
| — | FW | ALG | Ahmed Nadhir Benbouali (was on loan to Győr, now sold) |
| — | FW | PLE | Oday Dabbagh (was on loan to Aberdeen, now sold to Zamalek) |
| — | FW | BEL | Anthony Descotte (was on loan to Utrecht, now loaned to Volendam) |
| — | MF | FRA | Freddy Mbemba (signed from Versailles, then loaned to Guingamp) |
| — | FW | HAI | Mondy Prunier (was on loan to Francs Borains, now loaned to Eupen) |
| — | FW | BEL | Youssuf Sylla (was on loan to Willem II, now sold to Jagiellonia Białystok) |

==== Club Brugge ====
In:

| No. | Pos. | Nation | Player |
|---|---|---|---|
| — | FW | FRA | Mamadou Diakhon (from Reims) |
| — | MF | POR | Carlos Forbs (from Ajax) |
| — | MF | ESP | Alejandro Granados (promoted from Club NXT) |
| — | MF | NED | Ludovit Reis (from Hamburger SV) |
| — | MF | BEL | Cisse Sandra (loan return from Willem II) |
| — | MF | SRB | Aleksandar Stanković (from Inter Milan) |
| — | FW | GER | Nicolò Tresoldi (from Hannover 96) |

Out:

| No. | Pos. | Nation | Player |
|---|---|---|---|
| 9 | FW | ESP | Ferran Jutglà (to Celta de Vigo) |
| 21 | MF | POL | Michał Skóraś (to Gent) |
| 27 | MF | DEN | Casper Nielsen (to Standard Liège) |
| 30 | MF | SUI | Ardon Jashari (to Milan) |
| 55 | DF | BEL | Maxim De Cuyper (to Brighton & Hove Albion) |
| 68 | MF | MAR | Chemsdine Talbi (to Sunderland) |
| — | GK | ENG | Josef Bursik (was on loan to Hibernian, now sold to Portsmouth) |

==== Dender EH ====
In:

| No. | Pos. | Nation | Player |
|---|---|---|---|
| — | DF | CAN | Luc de Fougerolles (on loan from Fulham B) |
| — | GK | BEL | Louis Fortin (from Gent) |
| — | DF | NGR | Benjamin Fredrick (on loan from Brentford B) |
| — | MF | POL | Krzysztof Koton (from Polonia Warsaw) |
| — | MF | CZE | Roman Květ (was on loan from Viktoria Plzeň, now bought) |
| — | DF | NED | Luc Marijnissen (from Lierse) |
| — | MF | BEL | Noah Mbamba (on loan from Bayer Leverkusen) |
| — | DF | MAR | Nail Moutha-Sebtaoui (from RSCA Futures) |
| — | FW | CIV | Moïse Sahi Dion (from Strasbourg) |
| — | MF | ANG | Marsoni Sambu (from RWDM Brussels) |

Out:

| No. | Pos. | Nation | Player |
|---|---|---|---|
| 3 | DF | BEL | Joedrick Pupe (to Vancouver Whitecaps) |
| 5 | MF | POL | Karol Fila (to Wieczysta Kraków) |
| 6 | MF | BEL | Kéres Masangu (to Patro Eisden Maasmechelen) |
| 7 | MF | BEL | Ridwane M'Barki (to Patro Eisden Maasmechelen) |
| 8 | MF | BEL | Jasper Van Oudenhove (released to Francs Borains) |
| 9 | FW | BEL | Michaël Lallemand (released to Stockay) |
| 10 | MF | BEL | Lennard Hens (to Kortrijk) |
| 11 | FW | FRA | Aurélien Scheidler (was on loan from Bari, then bought, then sold to Charleroi) |
| 13 | GK | BEL | Julien Devriendt (to Patro Eisden Maasmechelen) |
| 22 | DF | BEL | Gilles Ruyssen (to Kortrijk) |
| 29 | DF | ENG | Tom Holmes (loan return to Luton Town) |
| 53 | DF | GUI | Dembo Sylla (loan return to Lorient) |
| — | MF | BEL | Kenneth Houdret (was on loan to Mons, now sold to Rochefort) |
| — | FW | CMR | Abdoulaye Yahaya (was on loan to Francs Borains, now loaned to Leixões) |

==== Genk ====
In:

| No. | Pos. | Nation | Player |
|---|---|---|---|
| — | FW | CMR | Aaron Bibout (from Västerås) |
| — | FW | SWE | Jusef Erabi (from Hammarby) |
| — | MF | BEL | Daan Heymans (from Charleroi) |
| — | MF | JPN | Junya Itō (from Reims) |
| — | GK | AUT | Tobias Lawal (from LASK) |
| — | MF | JPN | Ayumu Yokoyama (promoted from Jong Genk) |

Out:

| No. | Pos. | Nation | Player |
|---|---|---|---|
| 7 | MF | GHA | Christopher Bonsu Baah (to Al Qadsiah) |
| 15 | MF | BEL | Thomas Claes (to Zulte Waregem) |
| 24 | MF | BEL | Luca Oyen (placed at Jong Genk) |
| 39 | GK | BEL | Mike Penders (loan return to Chelsea) |
| 99 | FW | NGR | Tolu Arokodare (to Wolverhampton Wanderers) |
| — | MF | CIV | Aziz Ouattara (was on loan to Mechelen, now sold to Maccabi Netanya) |
| — | FW | SUI | Andi Zeqiri (loan return from Standard Liège, then sold to Widzew Łódź) |

==== Gent ====
In:

| No. | Pos. | Nation | Player |
|---|---|---|---|
| — | DF | HAI | Jean-Kévin Duverne (on loan from Nantes) |
| — | MF | BEL | Mohamed El Adfaoui (promoted from Jong KAA Gent) |
| — | DF | MAR | Hatim Essaouabi (from AS FAR) |
| — | MF | ALG | Abdelkahar Kadri (from Kortrijk) |
| — | FW | CIV | Wilfried Kanga (from Dinamo Zagreb) |
| — | DF | BEL | Bram Lagae (loan return from Kortrijk) |
| — | FW | BEL | David Mukuna-Trouet (promoted from Jong KAA Gent) |
| — | DF | EST | Maksim Paskotši (from Grasshopper) |
| — | GK | BEL | Kjell Peersman (from Jong PSV) |
| — | MF | POL | Michał Skóraś (from Club Brugge) |
| — | DF | BEL | Siebe Van der Heyden (from Mallorca) |

Out:

| No. | Pos. | Nation | Player |
|---|---|---|---|
| 3 | DF | JPN | Archie Brown (to Fenerbahçe) |
| 4 | DF | JPN | Tsuyoshi Watanabe (to Feyenoord) |
| 8 | MF | BEL | Pieter Gerkens (on loan to Cercle Brugge) |
| 9 | DF | ISL | Andri Guðjohnsen (to Blackburn Rovers) |
| 12 | FW | CAF | Hugo Gambor (on loan to Troyes) |
| 17 | MF | DEN | Andrew Hjulsager (released to Vejle) |
| 22 | DF | SEN | Noah Fadiga (to Aris) |
| 23 | DF | NGR | Jordan Torunarigha (to Hamburger SV) |
| 24 | MF | BEL | Sven Kums (retired) |
| 26 | GK | BEL | Louis Fortin (released to Dender EH) |
| 29 | MF | CPV | Hélio Varela (to Maccabi Tel Aviv) |
| 30 | GK | BEL | Célestin De Schrevel (to La Louvière) |
| — | DF | ANG | Núrio Fortuna (was on loan to Dunkerque, now loaned to Volos) |
| — | MF | AUS | Keegan Jelacic (was on loan to Brisbane Roar, now sold to Melbourne Victory) |
| — | MF | MAR | Ismaël Kandouss (was on loan to Al-Orobah, now sold to RS Berkane) |
| — | MF | JPN | Daisuke Yokota (was on loan to 1. FC Kaiserslautern, now loaned to Hannover 96) |

==== La Louvière ====
In:

| No. | Pos. | Nation | Player |
|---|---|---|---|
| — | FW | GHA | Jerry Afriyie (on loan from Al Qadsiah) |
| — | MF | FRA | Alexis Beka Beka (from Caen B) |
| — | FW | ALG | Mouhamed Belkheir (was on loan from Fortuna Sittard, now bought) |
| — | DF | ESP | Darío Benavides (from Sevilla Atlético) |
| — | MF | FRA | Lucas Bretelle (from Orléans) |
| — | GK | BEL | Célestin De Schrevel (from Gent) |
| — | MF | FRA | Théo Epailly (from Boulogne) |
| — | DF | BEL | Thierry Lutonda (from PEC Zwolle) |
| — | FW | SEN | Pape Moussa Fall (on loan from Metz) |
| — | MF | BEL | Noah Makembo-Ntemo (from SL16 FC) |
| — | MF | FRA | Oucasse Mendy (from Martigues) |
| — | DF | FRA | Yllan Okou (from Bastia) |
| — | DF | FRA | Matthis Riou (from Guingamp) |

Out:

| No. | Pos. | Nation | Player |
|---|---|---|---|
| 1 | GK | BEL | Arno Valkenaers (released to Mons) |
| 5 | DF | FRA | Victor Corneillie (released to Olympic Charleroi) |
| 7 | FW | TOG | Fadel Gobitaka (to RFC Liège) |
| 12 | DF | BEL | Tristan Loiseaux (on loan to Stockay) |
| 26 | MF | BEL | Adrien Bongiovanni (released to Seraing) |
| 27 | FW | NED | Raphaël Eyongo (on loan to Olympic Charleroi) |
| 28 | FW | FRA | Ivann Botella (loan return to Red Star) |
| 31 | DF | FRA | Hady Camara (released to Seraing) |
| 38 | MF | BEL | Thierno Diallo (on loan to Olympic Charleroi) |
| 44 | DF | NED | Daan Klomp (released to Cavalry FC) |
| 49 | DF | BEL | Luka Hoedaert (on loan to Tubize-Braine) |
| 70 | FW | FRA | Kenny Nagera (to Rodez) |
| — | DF | COD | Emmanuel Da Costa (signed from Lierse, then sold to Seraing) |
| — | DF | BEL | Florian Nicaise (to Manageoise) |

==== OH Leuven ====
In:

| No. | Pos. | Nation | Player |
|---|---|---|---|
| — | DF | CRO | Viktor Damjanić (from Jedinstvo Ub) |
| — | DF | BEL | Noë Dussenne (from Lausanne-Sport) |
| — | FW | GUI | Sory Kaba (from Las Palmas) |
| — | MF | USA | Bryang Kayo (from VfL Osnabrück) |
| — | MF | POL | Łukasz Łakomy (on loan from Young Boys) |
| — | FW | SRB | Jovan Mijatović (again on loan from New York City) |
| — | FW | BEL | Nachon Nsingi (loan return from Marítimo) |
| — | DF | JPN | Takuma Ominami (was on loan from Kawasaki Frontale, now bought) |
| — | MF | GER | Henok Teklab (from Union SG) |
| — | MF | FIN | Casper Terho (from Union SG) |
| — | FW | GUI | Abdoul Karim Traoré (from Bourg-Péronnas) |

Out:

| No. | Pos. | Nation | Player |
|---|---|---|---|
| 3 | DF | BEL | Antef Tsoungui (loan return to Feyenoord) |
| 6 | MF | NED | Ezechiel Banzuzi (to RB Leipzig) |
| 9 | FW | NED | Lequincio Zeefuik (loan return to AZ Alkmaar) |
| 14 | DF | URU | Federico Ricca (released to Belgrano) |
| 23 | MF | SRB | Stefan Mitrović (loan return to Hellas Verona) |
| 25 | MF | BEL | Manuel Osifo (on loan to Kortrijk) |
| 58 | DF | TUR | Hasan Kuruçay (released to Schalke 04) |
| 66 | DF | JPN | Ayumu Ōhata (to Cerezo Osaka) |
| — | FW | NOR | Jonatan Braut Brunes (was on loan to Raków Częstochowa, now sold) |
| — | MF | GHA | Emmanuel Toku (was on loan to AEL Limassol, then released) |

==== Mechelen ====
In:

| No. | Pos. | Nation | Player |
|---|---|---|---|
| — | DF | SEN | Gora Diouf (from Sion) |
| — | DF | SLO | Lovro Golič (from Roma) |
| — | DF | MAR | Redouane Halhal (loan return from Helmond Sport) |
| — | FW | BLR | Maksim Kireev (from Lierse) |
| — | DF | FRA | Thérence Koudou (from Pau) |
| — | DF | TUR | Halil Özdemir (promoted from Jong KVM) |
| — | MF | TOG | Dikeni Salifou (from Werder Bremen) |
| — | MF | BEL | Mathis Servais (from Beveren) |
| — | DF | NED | Tommy St. Jago (from Willem II) |
| — | MF | AUS | Ryan Teague (from Melbourne Victory) |
| — | MF | NED | Myron van Brederode (from AZ) |
| — | GK | BEL | Tijn Van Ingelgom (from Jong Genk) |
| — | GK | BEL | Axel Willockx (promoted from Jong KVM) |
| — | DF | MAR | Moncef Zekri (promoted from Jong KVM) |

Out:

| No. | Pos. | Nation | Player |
|---|---|---|---|
| 4 | DF | BEL | Toon Raemaekers (to Ferencváros) |
| 6 | DF | ALG | Ahmed Touba (loan return to İstanbul Başakşehir) |
| 7 | MF | BEL | Geoffry Hairemans (to Antwerp) |
| 9 | FW | BEL | Julien Ngoy (released to Al-Arabi) |
| 10 | MF | NOR | Petter Nosa Dahl (to Rapid Wien) |
| 11 | MF | BEL | Nikola Storm (to Antalyaspor) |
| 13 | DF | BEL | Zinho Vanheusden (loan return to Inter Milan) |
| 16 | MF | BEL | Rob Schoofs (to Union SG) |
| 17 | DF | ALG | Rafik Belghali (to Hellas Verona) |
| 21 | DF | SCO | Stephen Welsh (loan return to Celtic) |
| 23 | DF | BEL | Daam Foulon (to Antwerp) |
| 26 | MF | COD | Noah Makanza (on loan to Helmond Sport) |
| 29 | DF | BEL | Bas Van den Eynden (to Beerschot) |
| 31 | GK | BEL | Oskar Annell (to Westerlo) |
| 32 | MF | CIV | Aziz Ouattara (loan return to Genk) |
| 77 | MF | GER | Patrick Pflücke (to Charleroi) |
| — | DF | MAR | Amine Et-Taïbi (signed from Club NXT, then loaned to Helmond Sport) |

==== Sint-Truiden ====
In:

| No. | Pos. | Nation | Player |
|---|---|---|---|
| — | MF | MAR | Illyès Benachour (from Club Brugge U18) |
| — | FW | URU | Andrés Ferrari (was on loan from Villarreal B, now bought) |
| — | FW | JPN | Keisuke Gotō (on loan from Anderlecht) |
| — | DF | JPN | Taiga Hata (from Shonan Bellmare) |
| — | MF | JPN | Kaito Matsuzawa (from V-Varen Nagasaki) |
| — | MF | FRA | Ryan Merlen (from RFC Liège) |
| — | MF | ALB | Arbnor Muja (on loan from Samsunspor) |
| — | MF | BEL | Ilias Sebaoui (from Feyenoord) |
| — | MF | FRA | Abdoulaye Sissako (from Kortrijk) |

Out:

| No. | Pos. | Nation | Player |
|---|---|---|---|
| 2 | FW | JPN | Ryoya Ogawa (to Kashima Antlers) |
| 4 | DF | ALG | Zineddine Belaïd (to JS Kabylie) |
| 7 | DF | ALG | Billal Brahimi (loan return to Nice) |
| 8 | MF | JPN | Joel Chima Fujita (to FC St. Pauli) |
| 10 | MF | CMR | Didier Lamkel Zé (released to Qingdao Hainiu) |
| 14 | MF | BEL | Olivier Dumont (released to RWDM Brussels) |
| 15 | FW | USA | Kahveh Zahiroleslam (released to Cracovia) |
| 19 | DF | BEL | Louis Patris (was on loan from Anderlecht, then bought, then sold to Union SG) |
| 23 | FW | GHA | Joselpho Barnes (end of contract) |
| 31 | DF | BEL | Bruno Godeau (released to Beveren) |
| 41 | FW | JPN | Hiiro Komori (loan return to JEF United Chiba) |
| 91 | FW | BEL | Adriano Bertaccini (to Anderlecht) |

==== Standard Liège ====
In:

| No. | Pos. | Nation | Player |
|---|---|---|---|
| — | MF | BEL | Adnane Abid (from Patro Eisden Maasmechelen) |
| — | FW | GER | Dennis Eckert (was on loan from Union SG, now bought) |
| — | MF | MAR | Mohamed El Hankouri (from 1. FC Magdeburg) |
| — | FW | FRA | Thomas Henry (from Hellas Verona) |
| — | DF | TOG | Josué Homawoo (from Dinamo București) |
| — | MF | MAD | Marco Ilaimaharitra (from Kortrijk) |
| — | FW | FRA | Grejohn Kyei (loan return from Charleroi) |
| — | DF | CHI | Nayel Mehssatou (from Kortrijk) |
| — | MF | GER | Tobias Mohr (from Schalke 04) |
| — | MF | DEN | Casper Nielsen (from Club Brugge) |
| — | FW | FRA | Timothé Nkada (from Rodez) |
| — | GK | BEL | Lucas Pirard (from Kortrijk) |
| — | MF | RWA | Hakim Sahabo (loan return from Beerschot) |
| — | MF | COM | Rafiki Saïd (from Troyes) |

Out:

| No. | Pos. | Nation | Player |
|---|---|---|---|
| 3 | DF | BEL | Nathan Ngoy (to Lille) |
| 4 | DF | CRO | Boško Šutalo (on loan to Cracovia) |
| 6 | MF | GRE | Sotiris Alexandropoulos (loan return to Sporting Lisbon) |
| 7 | MF | CRO | Marko Bulat (loan return to Dinamo Zagreb) |
| 8 | MF | CIV | Jean Thierry Lazare (loan return to Union SG) |
| 9 | FW | SUI | Andi Zeqiri (loan return to Genk) |
| 24 | MF | AUS | Aiden O'Neill (to New York City) |
| 30 | GK | BEL | Laurent Henkinet (retired) |
| 31 | GK | IRL | Gavin Bazunu (loan return to Southampton) |
| 41 | DF | HUN | Attila Szalai (loan return to TSG Hoffenheim) |
| 55 | FW | MAR | Brahim Ghalidi (to NAC Breda) |
| 77 | FW | BEN | Andréas Hountondji (loan return to Burnley) |
| 99 | MF | BEL | Tom Poitoux (on loan to MVV Maastricht) |
| — | FW | MAR | Soufiane Benjdida (was on loan to RWD Molenbeek, then sold to Maghreb of Fez) |
| — | DF | SEN | Ilay Camara (was on loan from RWD Molenbeek, then bought, then sold to Anderlecht) |
| — | MF | MLI | Moussa Djenepo (was on loan to Antalyaspor, then sold to Esteghlal) |

==== Union SG ====
In:

| No. | Pos. | Nation | Player |
|---|---|---|---|
| — | MF | AUT | Raul Florucz (from Olimpija Ljubljana) |
| — | DF | BEL | Nathan Huygevelde (loan return from Kortrijk) |
| — | FW | GEQ | Cristian Makaté (promoted from Union SG B) |
| — | DF | BEL | Louis Patris (from Sint-Truiden) |
| — | MF | BEL | Ivan Pavlić (from Paços de Ferreira) |
| — | GK | NED | Kjell Scherpen (from Brighton & Hove Albion) |
| — | MF | BEL | Rob Schoofs (from Mechelen) |
| — | MF | BRA | Guilherme Smith (from Nõmme Kalju) |

Out:

| No. | Pos. | Nation | Player |
|---|---|---|---|
| 9 | FW | CRO | Franjo Ivanović (to Benfica) |
| 11 | MF | GER | Henok Teklab (to OH Leuven) |
| 14 | GK | SWE | Joachim Imbrechts (to RSCA Futures) |
| 21 | MF | BEL | Alessio Castro-Montes (to FC Köln) |
| 24 | MF | BEL | Charles Vanhoutte (to Nice) |
| 27 | MF | COD | Noah Sadiki (to Sunderland) |
| 49 | GK | LUX | Anthony Moris (to Al-Khaleej) |
| 85 | DF | BEL | Arnaud Dony (to Patro Eisden Maasmechelen) |
| — | FW | ALG | Mohamed Amoura (was on loan to, now sold VfL Wolfsburg) |
| — | FW | GER | Dennis Eckert (was on loan to Standard Liège, now sold) |
| — | MF | BEL | Elton Kabangu (was on loan to Heart of Midlothian, now sold) |
| — | MF | CIV | Jean Thierry Lazare (was on loan to Standard Liège, then released) |
| — | MF | FIN | Casper Terho (was on loan to SC Paderborn 07, now sold to OH Leuven) |

==== Westerlo ====
In:

| No. | Pos. | Nation | Player |
|---|---|---|---|
| — | GK | BEL | Oskar Annell (from Mechelen) |
| — | GK | TUR | Sinan Bolat (loan return from Kasımpaşa) |
| — | FW | KOS | Eliot Bujupi (on loan from VfB Stuttgart II) |
| — | MF | ESP | Antonio Cordero (on loan from Newcastle United) |
| — | FW | ESP | Nacho Ferri (from Eintracht Frankfurt) |
| — | FW | CIV | Fernand Gouré (loan return from Zürich) |
| — | GK | DEN | Andreas Jungdal (was on loan from Cremonese, now bought) |
| — | DF | JPN | Seiji Kimura (from FC Tokyo) |
| — | MF | MAR | Reda Laalaoui (from FUS Rabat) |
| — | DF | BEL | Lucas Mbamba (from Lille B) |
| — | FW | SCO | Adedire Mebude (loan return from Hamburger SV) |
| — | FW | JPN | Isa Sakamoto (was on loan from Gamba Osaka, now bought) |
| — | FW | BEL | Kyan Vaesen (loan return from Willem II) |

Out:

| No. | Pos. | Nation | Player |
|---|---|---|---|
| 1 | GK | TUR | Sinan Bolat (to Iğdır) |
| 5 | DF | AUS | Jordan Bos (to Feyenoord) |
| 9 | FW | CRO | Matija Frigan (to Parma) |
| 10 | MF | ENG | Alfie Devine (loan return to Tottenham Hotspur) |
| 19 | FW | ALG | Islam Slimani (loan return to Belouizdad) |
| 20 | GK | BEL | Nick Gillekens (released to Seraing) |
| 23 | DF | BEL | Rubin Seigers (released to Lommel) |
| 32 | MF | BUL | Edisson Jordanov (to Beerschot) |
| 36 | MF | AUS | Rhys Youlley (to Sydney) |
| 44 | MF | CRO | Luka Vušković (loan return to Hajduk Split) |
| — | GK | BEL | Zenzo De Boeck (on loan to Houtvenne) |
| — | MF | TUR | Muhammed Gümüşkaya (was on loan to Gaziantep, now sold to Bandırmaspor) |
| — | MF | POL | Enzo Geerts (signed from Jong PSV, then loaned to Houtvenne) |

==== Zulte Waregem ====
In:

| No. | Pos. | Nation | Player |
|---|---|---|---|
| — | MF | FRA | Marley Aké (on loan from Yverdon-Sport) |
| — | FW | NGR | Emeka Anachunam (on loan from Inspire Sports Academy) |
| — | MF | BEL | Thomas Claes (from Genk) |
| — | FW | DEN | Anosike Ementa (from Viborg) |
| — | GK | BEL | Brent Gabriël (from Lokeren-Temse) |
| — | FW | AUT | Tobias Hedl (was on loan from Rapid Wien, now bought) |
| — | DF | DEN | Jakob Kiilerich (from Mjällby) |
| — | MF | GER | Enrique Lofolomo (from Viktoria Köln) |
| — | MF | SRB | Nikola Mituljikić (from OFK Beograd) |
| — | DF | HAI | Wilguens Paugain (was on loan from St. Pölten, now bought) |
| — | FW | ENG | Emran Soglo (on loan from Sturm Graz) |
| — | MF | ALB | Serxho Ujka (from Egnatia) |

Out:

| No. | Pos. | Nation | Player |
|---|---|---|---|
| 7 | MF | BEL | Youssef Challouk (loan return to Kortrijk) |
| 8 | MF | BEL | Nicolas Rommens (released to Lommel) |
| 17 | MF | SEN | Pape Diop (to Strasbourg) |
| 30 | GK | BEL | Sef Van Damme (to Merelbeke) |
| 47 | DF | BEL | Andres Labie (on loan to Beerschot) |
| 59 | FW | PHI | Dylan Demuynck (on loan to Lierse) |
| 99 | FW | NED | Jevon Simons (on loan to De Graafschap) |

=== Challenger Pro League teams ===
==== Beerschot ====
In:

| No. | Pos. | Nation | Player |
|---|---|---|---|
| — | MF | BEL | Glenn Claes (from Lierse) |
| — | GK | BEL | Xavier Gies (from Francs Borains) |
| — | DF | BEL | Milan Govaers (promoted from Beerschot U23) |
| — | MF | FRA | Sabri Guendouz (from Guingamp) |
| — | MF | TUN | Anas Haj Mohamed (from Parma) |
| — | MF | JPN | Genki Haraguchi (from Urawa Red Diamonds) |
| — | MF | BEL | Xander Joosen (promoted from Beerschot U23) |
| — | MF | BUL | Edisson Jordanov (from Westerlo) |
| — | MF | ALG | Cyril Khetir (from Aubagne) |
| — | DF | BEL | Andres Labie (on loan from Zulte Waregem) |
| — | MF | URU | Thiago Lugano (from Valladolid) |
| — | MF | ALG | Keryane Mansouri (from Reims) |
| — | MF | TUR | Emre Uzun (from Antalyaspor) |
| — | DF | BEL | Bas Van den Eynden (from Mechelen) |
| — | MF | BEL | Lukas Van Eenoo (from Patro Eisden Maasmechelen) |
| — | MF | BEL | Axl Van Himbeeck (loan return from Helmond Sport) |
| — | FW | COD | Arnold Vula (from Le Mans) |

Out:

| No. | Pos. | Nation | Player |
|---|---|---|---|
| 2 | DF | TUR | Emir Ortakaya (loan return to Fenerbahçe) |
| 6 | DF | EGY | Omar Fayed (loan return to Fenerbahçe) |
| 7 | MF | BEL | Tom Reyners (to Lommel) |
| 8 | MF | SCO | Ewan Henderson (to Wycombe Wanderers) |
| 10 | FW | NED | Daishawn Redan (loan return to Avellino) |
| 16 | MF | KSA | Faisal Al-Ghamdi (loan return to Al-Ittihad) |
| 17 | MF | KSA | Marwan Al-Sahafi (loan return to Al-Ittihad) |
| 19 | DF | GUI | Cheick Thiam (released to Hasselt) |
| 23 | MF | RWA | Hakim Sahabo (loan return to Standard Liège) |
| 25 | FW | BEL | Antoine Colassin (to Charleroi) |
| 30 | FW | NED | Dean Huiberts (to Pro Vercelli) |
| 42 | DF | CUW | Ar'jany Martha (to Rotherham United) |
| 47 | DF | BEL | Welat Cagro (released to Portimonense) |
| 55 | DF | FRA | Félix Nzouango (released) |
| 66 | DF | GRE | Apostolos Konstantopoulos (released to Raków Częstochowa) |
| 71 | GK | CRO | Davor Matijaš (to Gorica) |
| 99 | DF | SUR | Djevencio van der Kust (loan return to Sparta Rotterdam) |
| — | FW | GER | Florian Krüger (was on loan to 1. FC Saarbrücken, now sold to MSV Duisburg) |

==== Beveren ====
In:

| No. | Pos. | Nation | Player |
|---|---|---|---|
| — | DF | BEL | Viktor Boone (from Lierse) |
| — | DF | BEL | Bruno Godeau (from Sint-Truiden) |
| — | DF | FRA | Yoni Gomis (on loan from Strasbourg) |
| — | DF | BEL | Christophe Janssens (from Francs Borains) |
| — | FW | CUW | Jearl Margaritha (from Phoenix Rising) |
| — | MF | BEL | Noah Mawete (from SL16 FC) |
| — | FW | JPN | Yutaka Michiwaki (again on loan from Roasso Kumamoto) |
| — | FW | FRA | Ilyes Najim (from Caen) |
| — | DF | CIV | Abdul Aziz Ouedraogo (again on loan from Crystal Palace U21) |
| — | MF | BEL | Dante Rigo (free agent) |
| — | MF | BEL | Ferre Slegers (from MVV Maastricht) |

Out:

| No. | Pos. | Nation | Player |
|---|---|---|---|
| 2 | DF | TTO | Sheldon Bateau (end of contract) |
| 5 | MF | BRA | Everton Luiz (end of contract) |
| 6 | MF | NED | Finn Dicke (loan return to Estoril) |
| 7 | MF | IRL | Liam Kerrigan (loan return to Como) |
| 8 | MF | BEL | Mathis Servais (to Mechelen) |
| 10 | FW | BEL | Anthony Limbombe (released to Ironi Kiryat Shmona) |
| 13 | DF | MAR | Ahmed Khatir (to Al-Riyadh) |
| 15 | DF | BEL | Dries Wuytens (end of contract) |
| 24 | DF | CMR | Hadji Issa Moustapha (loan return to Ararat Yerevan) |
| 30 | DF | BEL | Alexander Corryn (end of contract) |
| 32 | DF | CRO | Jakov Filipović (released to Gorica) |
| 43 | MF | BEL | Sander Coopman (released to Borac Banja Luka) |

==== Club NXT ====
In:

| No. | Pos. | Nation | Player |
|---|---|---|---|
| — | MF | MAR | Ilyas Bouazzaoui (from Jong Genk) |
| — | MF | BEL | Rayan Buifrahi (from MVV Maastricht) |
| — | DF | BEL | Samuel Gomez Van Hoogen (from Jong PSV) |
| — | MF | SLO | Tian Nai Koren (from Maribor) |
| — | DF | BEL | Sacha Marloye (from Seraing) |
| — | GK | HUN | Stefan Ostoici (from MTK Budapest U17) |

Out:

| No. | Pos. | Nation | Player |
|---|---|---|---|
| 67 | DF | MAR | Amine Et-Taïbi (to Mechelen) |
| 70 | MF | ESP | Alejandro Granados (promoted to Club Brugge) |
| 79 | FW | BEL | Lenn De Smet (to Kortrijk) |
| 80 | MF | BEL | Liam De Smet (to Kortrijk) |
| 85 | DF | BEL | Bruce Deuwel (to Knokke) |
| 91 | GK | BEL | Kiany Vroman (to Lierse) |
| — | FW | VEN | Daniel Pérez (was on loan to Lokeren-Temse, now sold to Nea Salamis Famagusta) |

==== Eupen ====
In:

| No. | Pos. | Nation | Player |
|---|---|---|---|
| — | FW | BEL | Zakaria Atteri (from RFC Liège) |
| — | MF | SUI | Gabriel Barès (from Burgos) |
| — | DF | COD | Merveille Bokadi (free agent) |
| — | MF | ESP | Oriol Busquets (from Andorra) |
| — | MF | FRA | Logan Delaurier-Chaubet (from Almere City) |
| — | DF | FRA | Nicolas Gavory (from Fortuna Düsseldorf) |
| — | GK | GER | Marco Hiller (from 1860 Munich) |
| — | FW | GER | Daniel Kasper (from Greuther Fürth II) |
| — | MF | GER | Mark Müller (from Eintracht Frankfurt II) |
| — | MF | NGR | Ade Oguns (was on loan from Caracas, now bought) |
| — | FW | HAI | Mondy Prunier (on loan from Charleroi) |
| — | DF | BEL | Lorenzo Youndje (loan return from Jong Genk) |

Out:

| No. | Pos. | Nation | Player |
|---|---|---|---|
| 6 | MF | BEL | Brandon Baiye (released to Erzurumspor) |
| 9 | FW | BEL | Renaud Emond (retired) |
| 10 | FW | GRN | Regan Charles-Cook (end of contract) |
| 14 | MF | BEL | Jérôme Déom (end of contract) |
| 17 | DF | ITA | Andrea Piron (on loan to Meux) |
| 19 | MF | SRB | Miloš Pantović (released to OFK Beograd) |
| 20 | DF | IDN | Shayne Pattynama (released to Buriram United) |
| 24 | FW | NGR | Philip Ejike (loan return to Montana) |
| 29 | DF | FRA | Teddy Alloh (released to Penafiel) |
| 30 | DF | SLO | Jan Gorenc (to Olimpija Ljubljana) |
| 34 | DF | BEL | Luca Chavet (on loan to Namur) |
| 58 | DF | BEL | Luca Dalla Costa (on loan to Lecce U21) |
| 90 | FW | TUR | Emrehan Gedikli (loan return to Konyaspor) |
| 99 | GK | BEL | Tom Roufosse (released to Raeren-Eynatten) |

==== Francs Borains ====
In:

| No. | Pos. | Nation | Player |
|---|---|---|---|
| — | FW | FRA | Aboubacar Ali Abdallah (from Strasbourg) |
| — | DF | FRA | Maxime Bastian (from Villefranche) |
| — | MF | BEL | Amine Benfriha (from OH Leuven U23) |
| — | MF | BEL | Massimo Bruno (from Kortrijk) |
| — | DF | BEL | Jason Dalle Molle (from Zébra Élites) |
| — | MF | FRA | Noah Diliberto (from Widzew Łódź) |
| — | FW | GHA | Emmanuel Essiam (on loan from Basel) |
| — | DF | ALG | Yanis Hadjem (from Martigues) |
| — | FW | BEL | Noah Lequeux (promoted from Francs Borains U21) |
| — | MF | SRB | Jovan Mituljikić (from Radnički Niš) |
| — | MF | BEL | Lukas Mondele (from Modena) |
| — | GK | COM | Yannick Pandor (on loan from Lens) |
| — | FW | BEL | Jordy Soladio (from Maccabi Petah Tikva) |
| — | GK | BEL | Victor Swinnen (from Houtvenne) |
| — | MF | BEL | Jasper Van Oudenhove (from Dender EH) |
| — | MF | BEL | Arsène Wukanya (from Crotone) |
| — | MF | AUT | Philipp Wydra (from Rapid Wien II) |

Out:

| No. | Pos. | Nation | Player |
|---|---|---|---|
| 1 | GK | BEL | Xavier Gies (released to Beerschot) |
| 2 | FW | HAI | Mondy Prunier (loan return to Charleroi) |
| 4 | DF | BEL | Christophe Janssens (to Beveren) |
| 5 | DF | FRA | Yanis Zodehougan (to Union Titus Pétange) |
| 9 | FW | LUX | Alessio Curci (to Neftçi) |
| 10 | MF | FRA | Yanis Massolin (to Modena) |
| 12 | MF | SEN | Mamadou Sané (loan return to Aris Limassol) |
| 15 | GK | FRA | Paul Argney (loan return to Le Havre) |
| 16 | FW | TUN | Jibril Othman (loan return to Saint-Étienne) |
| 19 | MF | MAR | Malek Adrar (released) |
| 22 | DF | BEL | Fostave Mabani (released to Seraing) |
| 27 | DF | BEL | Jordy Gillekens (released to Wehen Wiesbaden) |
| 29 | GK | BEL | Clément Libertiaux (released to Namur) |
| 34 | FW | BEL | Maxime Mejjati-Alami (loan return to SL16 FC) |
| 88 | FW | CMR | Abdoulaye Yahaya (loan return to Dender EH) |
| — | MF | POL | Patryk Walicki (was on loan to Tournai, now loaned to Knokke) |

==== Jong Genk ====
In:

| No. | Pos. | Nation | Player |
|---|---|---|---|
| — | FW | NGR | Victory Beniangba (loan return from Servette) |
| — | FW | BEL | Jonathan Coenen (from Hades) |
| — | DF | CIV | Ali Badra Diabaté (from Leader Sporting Club) |
| — | DF | KOR | Min-woo Kang (on loan from Ulsan HD) |
| — | MF | BEL | Luca Oyen (from Genk) |

Out:

| No. | Pos. | Nation | Player |
|---|---|---|---|
| 50 | DF | BEL | Lorenzo Youndje (loan return to Eupen) |
| 61 | GK | BEL | Tijn Van Ingelgom (to Mechelen) |
| 63 | DF | BEL | Martin Wasinski (loan return to Schalke 04) |
| 64 | MF | JPN | Ayumu Yokoyama (was on loan from Birmingham City, then bought, then promoted to Genk) |
| 66 | MF | BEL | Zaïd Bafdili (to Sporting B) |
| 70 | MF | MAR | Ilyas Bouazzaoui (to Club NXT) |
| 74 | FW | BEL | Cédric Nuozzi (to Alverca) |
| 75 | DF | ECU | Alfred Caicedo (on loan to Cádiz) |
| 78 | MF | CRO | Luka Lukanić (released) |
| 81 | GK | BEL | Keo Boets (to Dessel Sport) |

==== Jong KAA Gent ====
In:

| No. | Pos. | Nation | Player |
|---|---|---|---|
| — | FW | BEL | Simon Buggea (from Seraing) |
| — | DF | SEN | Mamadou Diallo (from Diambars) |
| — | FW | BEL | Ali Donny Sylla (promoted from Gent U18) |
| — | GK | BEL | Bas Evers (promoted from Gent U18) |
| — | DF | BEL | Trey Kongolo (promoted from Gent U18) |
| — | MF | BEL | Noah Laghmich (promoted from Gent U18) |
| — | DF | BEL | Briek Morel (from Hoffenheim U19) |
| — | GK | BEL | René Vanden Borre (loan return from Racing Gent) |
| — | MF | ISL | Viktor Vidarsson (promoted from Gent U18) |

Out:

| No. | Pos. | Nation | Player |
|---|---|---|---|
| 14 | MF | BEL | Mohamed El Adfaoui (promoted to Gent) |
| 19 | MF | BEL | Rune Van Den Bergh (to Lokeren) |
| 20 | FW | NGR | Umar Abubakar (loan return to Footwork) |
| — | MF | UKR | Mykhailo Dubrovnyi (was on loan to Racing Gent, now sold to Harelbeke) |
| — | MF | BEL | Benjamin Melkebeke (was on loan to Racing Gent, now sold to Zelzate) |
| — | FW | BEL | David Mukuna-Trouet (loan return from Racing Gent, then promoted to Gent) |

==== Kortrijk ====
In:

| No. | Pos. | Nation | Player |
|---|---|---|---|
| — | FW | IRL | Jonathan Afolabi (loan return from Cambuur) |
| — | DF | SCO | Matthew Anderson (from Celtic B) |
| — | MF | FRA | Mohamed Boussadia (promoted from Kortrijk U21) |
| — | MF | BEL | Youssef Challouk (loan return from Zulte Waregem) |
| — | MF | HUN | Csanád Dénes (from Zalaegerszeg) |
| — | FW | BEL | Lenn De Smet (from Club NXT) |
| — | MF | BEL | Liam De Smet (from Club NXT) |
| — | MF | BEL | Lennard Hens (from Dender EH) |
| — | MF | BEL | Ilan Hurtevent (loan return from Knokke) |
| — | DF | FRA | Rudy Kohon (from Betis Deportivo) |
| — | MF | BEL | Boris Lambert (on loan from Willem II) |
| — | MF | RSA | Cassius Mailula (on loan from Toronto) |
| — | FW | NGR | Sixtus Ogbuehi (from Eldense) |
| — | MF | BEL | Manuel Osifo (on loan from OH Leuven) |
| — | DF | BEL | Gilles Ruyssen (from Dender EH) |
| — | MF | BEL | Jellert Van Landschoot (from Patro Eisden Maasmechelen) |

Out:

| No. | Pos. | Nation | Player |
|---|---|---|---|
| 4 | DF | UKR | Mark Mampassi (loan return to Lokomotiv Moscow) |
| 6 | DF | CHI | Nayel Mehssatou (released to Standard Liège) |
| 8 | MF | TOG | Dermane Karim (loan return to Lommel) |
| 9 | FW | POL | Karol Czubak (to Motor Lublin) |
| 10 | MF | ALG | Abdelkahar Kadri (to Gent) |
| 11 | DF | BEL | Dion De Neve (to Blackburn Rovers) |
| 17 | MF | BEL | Massimo Bruno (released to Francs Borains) |
| 18 | FW | NED | Koen Kostons (loan return to SC Paderborn 07) |
| 19 | FW | ESP | Nacho Ferri (loan return to Eintracht Frankfurt) |
| 21 | FW | BEL | Kyan Himpe (on loan to Roeselare) |
| 23 | MF | MAD | Marco Ilaimaharitra (released to Standard Liège) |
| 24 | DF | JPN | Haruya Fujii (to Nagoya Grampus) |
| 26 | DF | BEL | Bram Lagae (loan return to Gent) |
| 27 | MF | FRA | Abdoulaye Sissako (to Sint-Truiden) |
| 33 | DF | JPN | Ryotaro Tsunoda (loan return to Cardiff City) |
| 35 | DF | BEL | Nathan Huygevelde (loan return to Union SG) |
| 93 | DF | HAI | Jean-Kévin Duverne (loan return to Nantes) |
| 95 | GK | BEL | Lucas Pirard (released to Standard Liège) |
| — | DF | ENG | Ryan Alebiosu (was on loan to St Mirren, now sold to Blackburn Rovers) |
| — | MF | BEL | Massimo Decoene (was on loan to Mura, then end of contract) |
| — | FW | BEL | Dylan Mbayo (was on loan to Zwolle, now sold) |
| — | FW | ALG | Billel Messaoudi (was on loan to Bandırmaspor, then sold) |
| — | MF | ROU | Raul Opruț (was on loan to Dinamo București, now sold) |
| — | FW | SEN | Djiby Seck (was on loan to Lokeren-Temse, then end of contract) |

==== Lierse ====
In:

| No. | Pos. | Nation | Player |
|---|---|---|---|
| — | GK | CAN | Kieran Baskett (loan return from Træff) |
| — | FW | PHI | Dylan Demuynck (on loan from Zulte Waregem) |
| — | MF | BEL | Noah De Ridder (from Jong Cercle) |
| — | DF | BEL | Vincent De Vos (from Tienen) |
| — | FW | BEL | Yann Gboua (on loan from SL16 FC) |
| — | MF | MAR | Yassin Hidraoui (from Schalke 04) |
| — | MF | BEL | Mauro Lenaerts (promoted from Lierse U21) |
| — | MF | BEL | Noam Mayoka-Tika (on loan from Charleroi) |
| — | DF | BEL | Jenthe Mertens (from Vaduz) |
| — | MF | FRA | Mansour Sy (from Concarneau) |
| — | GK | BEL | Willem Van Clemen (promoted from Lierse U21) |
| — | MF | BEL | Thiebe Van Elsuwege (from Lokeren-Temse) |
| — | MF | BEL | Cedric Van Meirvenne (from Racing Gent) |
| — | GK | BEL | Kiany Vroman (from Club NXT) |

Out:

| No. | Pos. | Nation | Player |
|---|---|---|---|
| 2 | DF | BEL | Pieter De Schrijver (to Patro Eisden Maasmechelen) |
| 3 | DF | NED | Luc Marijnissen (to Dender EH) |
| 10 | FW | BLR | Maksim Kireev (to Mechelen) |
| 17 | MF | BEL | Noah Hartmann (to Ganshoren) |
| 23 | DF | BEL | Viktor Boone (to Beveren) |
| 26 | MF | BEL | Noah Mawete (loan return to SL16 FC) |
| 28 | MF | BEL | Aboubacar Conte (loan return to RSCA Futures) |
| 30 | MF | BEL | Glenn Claes (to Beerschot) |
| 36 | GK | BEL | Lennard Leyssens (to Londerzeel) |
| 41 | GK | BEL | Kjell Peersman (loan return to Jong PSV) |
| 42 | FW | BEL | Aske Sampers (to Knokke) |
| 81 | MF | BEL | Niklo Dailly (loan return to RWDM) |
| 85 | DF | COD | Emmanuel Da Costa (to La Louvière) |
| — | FW | FRA | Exaucé Mafoumbi (loan return to Blackburn Rovers) |

==== Lokeren ====
In:

| No. | Pos. | Nation | Player |
|---|---|---|---|
| — | FW | NED | Tom Boere (from Terrassa) |
| — | MF | MAR | Anisse Brrou (from Lokomotiv Sofia) |
| — | DF | ESP | Diego Cámara (from Sabadell) |
| — | DF | BEL | Ibrahim Digberekou (on loan from Borussia Mönchengladbach II) |
| — | FW | ESP | Iñaki Elejalde (from Antequera) |
| — | DF | BEL | Jonas Lietaert (on loan from Cercle Brugge) |
| — | DF | ESP | Jordi Palacios (from Terrassa) |
| — | FW | NED | Daishawn Redan (on loan from Avellino) |
| — | DF | BEL | Senne Torck (from Club Brugge U18) |
| — | GK | NED | Tein Troost (from NAC Breda) |
| — | MF | BEL | Rune Van Den Bergh (from Jong KAA Gent) |
| — | MF | GHA | Sumaila Wasiu (from San Pedro) |

Out:

| No. | Pos. | Nation | Player |
|---|---|---|---|
| 1 | GK | BEL | Jelle Merckx (to Hamme) |
| 2 | DF | BEL | Soufiane El Banouhi (to Heist) |
| 7 | FW | NIG | Zakari Junior Lambo (released to Heist) |
| 8 | MF | BEL | Robbie Van Hauter (to HSV Hoek) |
| 9 | DF | BEL | Gil Van Moerzeke (to Lebbeke) |
| 11 | MF | BEL | Olivier Myny (released) |
| 13 | GK | BEL | Brent Gabriël (to Zulte Waregem) |
| 19 | FW | FRA | Samuel Ntamack (loan return to Annecy) |
| 22 | MF | BEL | Allan Tshimanga (released to Tubize-Braine) |
| 27 | MF | NED | Thomas Marijnissen (end of contract) |
| 30 | FW | VEN | Daniel Pérez (loan return to Club NXT) |
| 33 | MF | BEL | Thiebe Van Elsuwege (to Lierse) |
| 35 | DF | BEL | Cederick Van Daele (released to Mons) |
| 45 | FW | SEN | Djiby Seck (loan return to Kortrijk) |
| 74 | FW | MAD | Nicolas Fontaine (to Septemvri Sofia) |
| 88 | MF | UKR | Denys Prychynenko (to Patro Eisden Maasmechelen) |
| — | MF | BEL | Alain Matoka (signed from Ninove, then loaned to Hasselt) |
| — | FW | TOG | Fousseni Ouro-Sama (was on loan to Roeselare, now sold to Knokke) |

==== Lommel ====
In:

| No. | Pos. | Nation | Player |
|---|---|---|---|
| — | DF | ENG | Timothy Eyoma (from Northampton Town) |
| — | MF | ARG | Lautaro López (on loan from Montevideo City) |
| — | FW | BEL | Alexander Reumers (from Genk U18) |
| — | MF | BEL | Tom Reyners (from Beerschot) |
| — | MF | BEL | Nicolas Rommens (from Zulte Waregem) |
| — | DF | BEL | Rubin Seigers (from Westerlo) |
| — | FW | NED | Ralf Seuntjens (from De Graafschap) |
| — | MF | HUN | Zalán Vancsa (loan return from Roda JC) |

Out:

| No. | Pos. | Nation | Player |
|---|---|---|---|
| 7 | MF | BEL | Théo Mununga (on loan to Eindhoven) |
| 8 | MF | MLI | Ibrahima Kébé (loan return to Girona) |
| 10 | FW | ANG | Igor Vetokele (retired) |
| 11 | MF | ESP | Álvaro Santos (on loan to Penafiel) |
| 18 | MF | IRL | Danny McGrath (released) |
| 20 | FW | URU | Nicolás Siri (loan return to Montevideo City) |
| 38 | DF | GHA | Yeboah Amankwah (released) |
| 44 | FW | FRA | Yvann Titi (loan return to Troyes) |
| 64 | MF | SCO | Tsoanelo Letsosa (released to Partick Thistle) |
| 66 | MF | BEL | Toon Franssen (to Young Reds Antwerp) |
| 99 | FW | MEX | Hugo Weckmann (released to Pachuca) |
| — | FW | BRA | Cauê (was on loan to Casa Pia, now sold to Criciúma) |
| — | MF | SRB | Đorđe Gordić (was on loan to Radomlje, now loaned to Debrecen) |
| — | MF | TOG | Dermane Karim (was on loan to Kortrijk, now loaned to Lorient) |
| — | MF | BUL | Filip Krastev (was on loan to PEC Zwolle, now loaned to Oxford United) |
| — | FW | MNE | Lazar Mijović (was on loan to Trenčín, now sold to Budućnost Podgorica) |
| — | MF | JPN | Koki Saito (was on loan to Queens Park Rangers, now sold) |
| — | MF | FIN | Juho Talvitie (was on loan to Heracles, now loaned to NAC Breda) |

==== Olympic Charleroi ====
In:

| No. | Pos. | Nation | Player |
|---|---|---|---|
| — | MF | LUX | Rayan Berberi (from Dynamo České Budějovice) |
| — | DF | CAF | Kenny Kima Beyissa (from Virton) |
| — | MF | BEL | Mathieu Cachbach (from Seraing) |
| — | DF | FRA | Victor Corneillie (from La Louvière) |
| — | MF | BEL | Niklo Dailly (from RWDM Brussels) |
| — | MF | BEL | Thierno Diallo (on loan from La Louvière) |
| — | FW | NED | Raphaël Eyongo (on loan from La Louvière) |
| — | DF | BEL | Luca Ferrara (from Swift Hesperange) |
| — | MF | ROU | Luca Florică (from Chrudim) |
| — | MF | ROU | Robert Ion (from Concordia Chiajna) |
| — | DF | NOR | Hasan Jahić (from Petrolul Ploiești) |
| — | MF | FRA | Soudeysse Kari (on loan from Zébra Élites) |
| — | DF | BEL | Kevin Kis (from Patro Eisden Maasmechelen) |
| — | FW | CRO | Vito Kopic (from Universitatea Cluj U18) |
| — | FW | NED | Toshio Lake (from Lamia) |
| — | MF | MNE | Oliver Sarkic (from Budućnost) |
| — | FW | SRB | Slobodan Stanojlovic (from OFK Beograd) |
| — | GK | CZE | David Vitasek (from Slovan Velvary) |

Out:

| No. | Pos. | Nation | Player |
|---|---|---|---|
| 6 | MF | ALG | Mehdi Terki (to Bissen) |
| 7 | FW | BEL | Jesse Mputu (to Ninove) |
| 8 | MF | BEL | Simon Paulet (to RFC Liège) |
| 9 | FW | BEL | Léandro Rousseau (to Patro Eisden Maasmechelen) |
| 10 | MF | BEL | Geoffrey Ghesquière (to Acren Lessines) |
| 21 | MF | ALG | Toufik Zeghdane (to Bissen) |
| 22 | DF | BEL | Ayoub Kouri (released to Tubize-Braine) |
| 30 | FW | BEL | Roman Ferber (to Bissen) |
| 44 | DF | SEN | Thierno Gaye (released to Seraing) |
| 46 | DF | COM | Aaron Kamardin (to Patro Eisden Maasmechelen) |

==== Patro Eisden Maasmechelen ====
In:

| No. | Pos. | Nation | Player |
|---|---|---|---|
| — | MF | KSA | Mohammed Al-Rashidi (from Panserraikos) |
| — | DF | BEL | Pieter De Schrijver (from Lierse) |
| — | GK | BEL | Julien Devriendt (from Dender EH) |
| — | DF | BEL | Arnaud Dony (from Union SG) |
| — | DF | COM | Aaron Kamardin (from Olympic Charleroi) |
| — | MF | DOM | Jimmy Kaparos (from Rot-Weiss Essen) |
| — | MF | BEL | Kéres Masangu (from Dender EH) |
| — | FW | BEL | Junior Mbaku-Mbabit (from Hasselt U21) |
| — | MF | BEL | Ridwane M'Barki (from Dender EH) |
| — | DF | BEL | Japhet Muanza (from Hasselt) |
| — | FW | BEL | Nicolas Orye (from Hasselt) |
| — | GK | ALB | Alesio Pano (from Roda JC U19) |
| — | DF | FRA | Aloïs Penin (from Mons) |
| — | MF | UKR | Denys Prychynenko (from Lokeren) |
| — | MF | NED | Amir Rais (from Feyenoord) |
| — | MF | BEL | Milan Robberechts (from Fortuna Sittard) |
| — | FW | BEL | Léandro Rousseau (from Olympic Charleroi) |

Out:

| No. | Pos. | Nation | Player |
|---|---|---|---|
| 3 | DF | BEL | Kevin Kis (released to Olympic Charleroi) |
| 6 | DF | NED | Henk Dijkhuizen (retired) |
| 7 | MF | BEL | Lukas Van Eenoo (to Beerschot) |
| 12 | GK | BEL | Jordy Belin (to RFC Liège) |
| 17 | DF | USA | Justin Che (loan return to Brøndby) |
| 18 | DF | CMR | Raoul Kenne (on loan to Mons) |
| 20 | MF | BEL | Reno Wilmots (released to RFC Liège) |
| 26 | GK | BEL | Stef Kempeneers (to MVV Maastricht) |
| 29 | MF | BEL | Tom Pietermaat (released to Houtvenne) |
| 30 | DF | BEL | Simon Bammens (released to Pardubice) |
| 40 | DF | BEL | William Simba (released) |
| 45 | FW | SEN | Papa Demba Ndior (to Karşıyaka) |
| 48 | MF | BEL | Adnane Abid (to Standard Liège) |
| 90 | FW | FRA | Vicky Kiankaulua (released to IMT) |
| 99 | MF | BEL | Jellert Van Landschoot (to Kortrijk) |
| — | MF | RSA | Muhammad Carrim (signed from Alcorcón B, then released) |
| — | MF | NED | Thomas van Bommel (was on loan to Bocholt, now released to Tongeren) |

==== RFC Liège ====
In:

| No. | Pos. | Nation | Player |
|---|---|---|---|
| — | GK | MAR | Alexis André Jr. (from Maidstone United) |
| — | GK | BEL | Jordy Belin (from Patro Eisden Maasmechelen) |
| — | MF | BEL | Alexis De Sart (from RWDM Brussels) |
| — | MF | SEN | Oumar Diouf (from Gençlik Gücü) |
| — | FW | TOG | Fadel Gobitaka (from La Louvière) |
| — | MF | BEL | Kylian Hazard (from Tubize-Braine) |
| — | DF | FRA | Eric N'Jo (from Virton) |
| — | MF | BEL | Simon Paulet (from Olympic Charleroi) |
| — | MF | ARG | Darío Sarmiento (on loan from Tigre) |
| — | MF | ALB | Kevin Shkurti (from OH Leuven U23) |
| — | FW | BEL | Frédéric Soelle Soelle (on loan from RWDM Brussels) |
| — | DF | BEL | Martin Wasinski (on loan from Schalke 04) |
| — | MF | BEL | Reno Wilmots (from Patro Eisden Maasmechelen) |

Out:

| No. | Pos. | Nation | Player |
|---|---|---|---|
| 1 | GK | BEL | Kevin Debaty (to Tilff) |
| 2 | MF | FRA | Jérémie Lioka (end of contract) |
| 6 | MF | FRA | Ryan Merlen (to Sint-Truiden) |
| 9 | FW | BEL | Zakaria Atteri (to Eupen) |
| 12 | MF | BEL | Alessandro Albanese (to Egnatia) |
| 12 | GK | BEL | Antoine Lejoly (to ADO Den Haag) |
| 19 | MF | BEL | Benjamin Lambot (to Crossing Schaerbeek) |
| 21 | MF | BEL | Alessio Cascio (to Portogruaro) |
| 22 | GK | BEL | Joshua Mpenza (on loan to Aywaille) |
| 23 | MF | CGO | Yannick Loemba (to Namur) |
| 26 | FW | BEL | Maxime Cavelier (to Stockay) |

==== RSCA Futures ====
In:

| No. | Pos. | Nation | Player |
|---|---|---|---|
| — | DF | NGR | Babatunde Akomolede (from Broad City) |
| — | MF | SEN | Pape Aliya N'dao (on loan from Young African Promises) |
| — | MF | GHA | Antwi Dacosta (on loan from Young Apostles) |
| — | DF | BEL | Gabriel Djondo (promoted from Anderlecht U18) |
| — | GK | BEL | Lander Gijsbers (from OH Leuven U23) |
| — | GK | SWE | Joachim Imbrechts (from Union SG) |
| — | MF | COD | Samuel Ntanda-Lukisa (from Sampdoria) |
| — | DF | BEL | Joël Putu Matadi (from Charleroi U18) |

Out:

| No. | Pos. | Nation | Player |
|---|---|---|---|
| 30 | MF | ALB | Behar Ismaili (to Real) |
| 35 | GK | GER | Timo Schlieck (loan return to RB Leipzig) |
| 42 | FW | JPN | Keisuke Gotō (promoted to Anderlecht) |
| 51 | DF | MAR | Ismaël Baouf (to Cambuur) |
| 67 | DF | MAR | Nail Moutha-Sebtaoui (to Dender EH) |
| 77 | MF | BEL | Milan Robberechts (loan return to Fortuna Sittard) |
| 85 | MF | BEL | Joren Dom (released to Kontich) |
| — | MF | BEL | Aboubacar Conte (was on loan to Lierse, now sold to OH Leuven U23) |
| — | MF | BEL | Lars Montegnies (was on loan to Mons, now sold) |

==== RWDM Brussels ====
In:

| No. | Pos. | Nation | Player |
|---|---|---|---|
| — | MF | NZL | Victor Barbosa (from Auckland United) |
| — | DF | BEL | Tim Bazelmans (from Union SG U21) |
| — | GK | FRA | Justin Bengui (on loan from Lyon) |
| — | DF | FRA | Yacine Chaïb (on loan from Lyon B) |
| — | MF | BEL | Olivier Dumont (from Sint-Truiden) |
| — | MF | BRA | Huguinho (on loan from Botafogo) |
| — | DF | GUI | Madiou Keita (from Auxerre II) |
| — | DF | BEL | Mats Lemmens (was on loan from Lecce, now bought) |
| — | MF | MAR | Ali Loune (from 1. FC Nürnberg) |
| — | FW | ARG | Francisco Montoro (from Vélez Sarsfield) |
| — | DF | BEL | Tibo Persyn (from Eindhoven) |
| — | MF | PAR | Matías Segovia (from Botafogo) |
| — | FW | CAF | Usman Simbakoli (from Servette) |
| — | DF | BEL | Manoël Verhaeghe (from Union SG U21) |

Out:

| No. | Pos. | Nation | Player |
|---|---|---|---|
| 5 | MF | BEL | Alexis De Sart (released to RFC Liège) |
| 6 | MF | FRA | Islamdine Halifa (loan return to Lyon) |
| 8 | MF | JPN | Shuto Abe (to Gamba Osaka) |
| 9 | FW | POL | Piotr Parzyszek (released to KuPS) |
| 15 | MF | MAR | Achraf Laâziri (loan return to Lyon) |
| 21 | MF | ANG | Marsoni Sambu (to Dender EH) |
| 22 | FW | BEL | Frédéric Soelle Soelle (on loan to RFC Liège) |
| 25 | MF | BRA | Romildo Del Piage (released to Avaí) |
| 43 | DF | BRA | David Sousa (to Casa Pia) |
| 51 | DF | BEL | Xavier Preijs (on loan to Crossing Schaerbeek) |
| 53 | MF | BEL | Adnane Messad-Kouchiche (to Crossing Schaerbeek) |
| 60 | DF | GHA | Abdul Awudu (loan return to Arabian Falcons) |
| 77 | FW | MTQ | Mickaël Biron (to 1. FC Nürnberg) |
| 99 | FW | MAR | Soufiane Benjdida (loan return to Standard Liège) |
| — | DF | SEN | Ilay Camara (was on loan to Standard Liège, now sold) |
| — | MF | BEL | Niklo Dailly (was on loan to Lierse, then released to Olympic Charleroi) |
| — | DF | BEL | Matteo Vandendaele (was on loan to Ganshoren, now loaned to Diegem) |

==== Seraing ====
In:

| No. | Pos. | Nation | Player |
|---|---|---|---|
| — | FW | BEL | Hemsley Akpa-Chukwu (from Bari) |
| — | FW | FRA | Abdoulaye Ba (on loan from Metz B) |
| — | MF | FRA | Wassim Bahri (from Metz) |
| — | MF | SRB | Relja Bisevac (from Racing Union Luxembourg) |
| — | MF | BEL | Adrien Bongiovanni (from La Louvière) |
| — | DF | GER | Kevin Bukusu (from VfB Lübeck) |
| — | DF | FRA | Hady Camara (from La Louvière) |
| — | MF | BEL | Vangelis Costoulas (promoted from Seraing U21) |
| — | DF | COD | Emmanuel Da Costa (from La Louvière) |
| — | GK | BEL | Arthur De Bolle (from Tubize-Braine) |
| — | MF | BEL | Valerio Di Crescenzo (promoted from Seraing U21) |
| — | DF | SEN | Thierno Gaye (from Olympic Charleroi) |
| — | GK | BEL | Nick Gillekens (from Westerlo) |
| — | MF | BEL | Tom Lockman (promoted from Seraing U21) |
| — | DF | BEL | Fostave Mabani (from Francs Borains) |
| — | FW | BEL | Maxime Mejjati-Alami (on loan from Nantes B) |
| — | GK | CMR | Boris Ngoua (promoted from Seraing U21) |
| — | FW | GAB | Harrison Ondo-Eyi (from Union SG U23) |
| — | DF | BEL | Thiago Paulo da Silva (from SL16 FC) |
| — | FW | FRA | Édouard Soumah-Abbad (on loan from Metz) |

Out:

| No. | Pos. | Nation | Player |
|---|---|---|---|
| 1 | GK | SEN | Ousmane Ba (loan return to Metz) |
| 2 | DF | BEL | Sacha Marloye (to Club NXT) |
| 4 | DF | BEL | Abdoul Botaka (to Namur) |
| 7 | MF | GUI | Mohamed Camara (released) |
| 8 | MF | BEL | Nils Schouterden (retired) |
| 9 | FW | SEN | Pape Moussa Fall (loan return to Metz) |
| 16 | GK | FRA | Lucas Margueron (to Rodez) |
| 19 | FW | CIV | Patrick Ouotro (loan return to Strasbourg) |
| 20 | MF | FRA | Sonny Perrey (to Minerva Lintgen) |
| 22 | DF | BEL | Yannis Lawson (to Metz) |
| 27 | MF | BEL | Mathieu Cachbach (to Olympic Charleroi) |
| 28 | DF | FRA | Ruben Droehnlé (to Bordeaux) |
| 54 | FW | BEL | Simon Buggea (to Jong KAA Gent) |
