= 2025–26 K. Patro Eisden Maasmechelen season =

Patro Eisden Maasmechelen
2025–26 season
- Manager: Stijn Stijnen
- Stadium: Gemeentelijk Sportstadion
- Challenger Pro League: 3rd
- Belgian Cup: TBD
- Top goalscorer: League: Léandro Rousseau (3); All: Léandro Rousseau (3)

== Squad ==
As of 14 September 2025

Note: Flags indicate national team as defined under FIFA eligibility rules; some limited exceptions apply. Players may hold more than one non-FIFA nationality.

| No. | Pos. | Nation | Player |
|---|---|---|---|
| 1 | GK | BEL | Gian Gelade |
| 2 | DF | BEL | Pieter De Schrijver |
| 4 | DF | BEL | Kjetil Borry |
| 5 | DF | BEL | Benoit Olivier |
| 6 | MF | BEL | Kéres Masangu |
| 8 | MF | BEL | Stef Peeters |
| 9 | FW | BEL | Leandro Rousseau |
| 10 | MF | BEL | Ridwane M'Barki |
| 11 | MF | NED | Amir Rais |
| 13 | DF | UKR | Denys Prychynenko |
| 14 | DF | BEL | Jordan Renson (captain) |
| 16 | GK | BEL | Julien Devriendt |
| 17 | FW | MAR | Ilyas Lefrancq |
| 18 | MF | DOM | Jimmy Kaparos |

| No. | Pos. | Nation | Player |
|---|---|---|---|
| 19 | FW | BEL | Junior Mbaku |
| 21 | MF | BEL | Simon Boogmans |
| 26 | GK | ALB | Alesio Pano |
| 28 | FW | BEL | Nezar Ahassad |
| 31 | FW | BEL | Nicolas Orye |
| 34 | MF | BEL | Tarek Loutfi |
| 39 | FW | BEL | Milan Robberechts |
| 46 | DF | COM | Aaron Kamardin |
| 52 | MF | NED | Raphaël Sarfo |
| 55 | DF | BEL | Japhet Muanza |
| 62 | DF | FRA | Aloïs Penin |
| 81 | FW | CGO | Vancy Mabanza |
| 85 | DF | BEL | Arnaud Dony |
| 90 | MF | KSA | Mohammed Al-Rashidi |

== Transfers ==
=== Transfers In ===
| Pos. | Player | Transferred from | Fee | Date | Source |
|---|---|---|---|---|---|
| FW | (Belgium) Léandro Rousseau | (Belgium) Olympic Charleroi | Free | 1 July 2025 | |
| DF | (Belgium) Ridwane M'Barki | (Belgium) FCV Dender EH | Undisclosed | 12 July 2025 | |
| GK | (Belgium) Julien Devriendt | (Belgium) FCV Dender EH | Undisclosed | 25 July 2025 | |
| MF | (Saudi Arabia) Mohammed Al-Rashidi | (Greece) Panserraikos | Free | 25 August 2025 | |
| MF | (Dominican Republic) Jimmy Kaparos | (Germany) Rot-Weiss Essen | Free | 6 September 2025 | |
| MF | (Belgium) Kéres Masangu | (Belgium) FCV Dender EH | Undisclosed | 8 September 2025 | |

== Friendlies ==
| 26 July 2025 | Patro Eisden Maasmechelen (Belgium) | 1–0 | (Netherlands) RKC Waalwijk |

| 2 August 2025 | Patro Eisden Maasmechelen (Belgium) | 1–0 | (Netherlands) MVV Maastricht |

== Competitions ==
=== Overall record ===
| Competition | First match | Last match | Starting round | Record | | | | | | | |
| Competition | First match | Last match | Starting round | Pld | W | D | L | GF | GA | GD | Win % |
|---|---|---|---|---|---|---|---|---|---|---|---|
| Challenger Pro League | 8 August 2025 | 19 April 2026 | Matchday 1 | 5 | 3 | 0 | 2 | 6 | 6 | +0 | 60.00 |
| Belgian Cup | 6 September 2025 | | Sixth round | 1 | 1 | 0 | 0 | 2 | 1 | +1 | 100.00 |
| Total | | | | 6 | 4 | 0 | 2 | 8 | 7 | +1 | 66.67 |

Last updated: 13 September 2025
Source: Competitions

=== Challenger Pro League ===
==== League table ====
| Pos | Team | Pld | W | D | L | GF | GA | GD | Pts | Qualification |
|---|---|---|---|---|---|---|---|---|---|---|
| 4 | RFC Liège | 32 | 16 | 5 | 11 | 44 | 39 | +5 | 53 | Qualification for promotion play-offs |
| 5 | Lommel (P) | 32 | 15 | 8 | 9 | 59 | 46 | +13 | 53 | Qualification for promotion play-offs |
| 6 | Patro Eisden Maasmechelen | 32 | 14 | 9 | 9 | 44 | 40 | +4 | 51 | Qualification for promotion play-offs |
| 7 | Eupen | 32 | 12 | 11 | 9 | 44 | 36 | +8 | 47 | |
| 8 | Lokeren | 32 | 10 | 12 | 10 | 45 | 45 | 0 | 42 | |

Source: Challenger Pro League
Rules for classification: 1) Points; 2) Matches won; 3) Goal difference; 4) Goals scored; 5) Away matches won; 6) Away goal difference; 7) Away goals made.
(P) Promoted

==== Results summary ====
| Overall | | | | | | | | Home | | | | | | Away | | | | | |
| Pld | W | D | L | GF | GA | GD | Pts | W | D | L | GF | GA | GD | W | D | L | GF | GA | GD |
|---|---|---|---|---|---|---|---|---|---|---|---|---|---|---|---|---|---|---|---|
| 5 | 3 | 0 | 2 | 6 | 6 | 0 | 9 | 2 | 0 | 1 | 4 | 4 | 0 | 1 | 0 | 1 | 2 | 2 | 0 |

Last updated: 13 September 2025.

==== Results by round ====
| Round | 1 | 2 | 3 | 4 | 5 |
|---|---|---|---|---|---|
| Ground | H | A | H | A | H |
| Result | W | L | W | W | L |
| Position | | | | | |

Updated to match(es) played on 13 September 2025. Source:
A = Away; H = Home; W = Win; D = Draw; L = Loss

==== Matches ====
The match schedule was announced on 3 July 2025.

| 9 August 2025 1 | Patro Eisden Maasmechelen | 2–1 | Lokeren |

| 15 August 2025 2 | Francs Borains | 2–0 | Patro Eisden Maasmechelen |

| 22 August 2025 3 | Patro Eisden Maasmechelen | 2–1 | Club NXT | Machelen |
| 20:00 | Mabanza 4'; Rousseau 52' | | Granados 54' | Stadium: Gemeentelijk Sportstadion; Referee: Tom Stevens |

| 30 August 2025 4 | RFC Liège | 0–2 | Patro Eisden Maasmechelen | Liège |
| 20:00 | | | | Stadium: Stade Vélodrome de Rocourt; Referee: Bert Verbeke |

| 13 September 2025 5 | Patro Eisden Maasmechelen | 0–2 | Lommel |
| 16:00 |

=== Belgian Cup ===
| 6 September 2025 Sixth round | Oudenaarde | 1–2 | Patro Eisden Maasmechelen | Oudenaarde |
| 20:00 | | | | Stadium: Thienpontstadion |

| 30 October 2025 Round of 16 | Gent | v | Patro Eisden Maasmechelen |
