= 2025–26 KVC Westerlo season =

KVC Westerlo
2025–26 season
- President: Oktay Ercan
- Manager: Issame Charaï
- Stadium: Het Kuipje
- Belgian Pro League: Regular season: 9th
- Belgian Pro League: Europe play-offs: 4th
- Belgian Cup: Round of 16
- Top goalscorer: League: Nacho Ferri (11); All: Nacho Ferri (11)
- Highest home attendance: 6,509 vs Mechelen
- Lowest home attendance: 5,645 vs Zulte Waregem
- Biggest win: Sint-Truiden 0–3 Westerlo
- Biggest defeat: Anderlecht 5–2 Westerlo; Cercle Brugge 4–1 Westerlo
Home colours

The 2025–26 season is the 93rd in KVC Westerlo's history and its fourth consecutive season in the top flight of Belgian football, the Belgian Pro League. The club will also take part in the Belgian Cup.

On 17 June 2025, the club announced the appointment of Issame Charaï as head coach.

== Squad ==
No.	Name	Position	Nationality	Age	Joined
99	Andreas Jungdal	GK	(Denmark)	24	2025
	Oskar Annell	GK	(Belgium)	21	2025
40	Emin Bayram	DF	(Turkey)	23	2024
22	Bryan Reynolds	DF	(United States)	25	2023
25	Tuur Rommens	DF	(Belgium)	23	2023
	Amando Lapage	DF	(Belgium)	21	2025
33	Roman Neustädter	DF	(Russia)	38	2022
	Lucas Mbamba	DF	(Belgium)	20	2025
	Seiji Kimura	DF	(Japan)	25	2025
7	Allahyar Sayyadmanesh	MF	(Iran)	25	2024
13	Isa Sakamoto	MF	(Japan)	23	2025
8	Serhiy Sydorchuk	MF	(Ukraine)	35	2023
34	Doğucan Haspolat	MF	(Turkey)	26	2023
	Adedire Mebude	MF	(Scotland)	22	2023
18	Griffin Yow	MF	(United States)	24	2022
	Arthur Piedfort	MF	(Belgium)	21	2023
39	Thomas Van den Keybus	MF	(Belgium)	25	2023
	Mathias Fixelles	MF	(Belgium)	30	2022
	Raf Smekens	MF	(Belgium)	22	2023
	Antonio Cordero	MF	(Spain)	19	2025
	Reda Laalaoui	MF	(Morocco)	21	2025
77	Josimar Alcócer	FW	(Costa Rica)	22	2023
90	Nacho Ferri	FW	(Spain)	22	2025
14	Kyan Vaesen	FW	(Belgium)	25	2011
	Eliot Bujupi	FW	(Kosovo)	20	2025

=== Transfers In ===
Pos.	Player	Transferred from	Fee	Date	Source
FW	(Ivory Coast) Fernand Gouré	(Switzerland) Zürich	Loan return	30 June 2025	
FW	(Belgium) Kyan Vaesen	(Netherlands) Willem II	Loan return	30 June 2025	
MF	(Japan) Isa Sakamoto	(Japan) Gamba Osaka	Undisclosed (Note: Purchase option activated)	1 July 2025	
GK	(Denmark) Andreas Jungdal	(Italy) Cremonese	Undisclosed	1 July 2025	
GK	(Belgium) Oskar Annell	(Belgium) Mechelen	Free	1 July 2025	
FW	(Spain) Nacho Ferri	(Germany) Eintracht Frankfurt	€2,000,000	8 July 2025	
DF	(Belgium) Lucas Mbamba	(France) LOSC Lille B	Undisclosed	29 July 2025	
MF	(Spain) Antonio Cordero	(England) Newcastle United	Loan	1 August 2025	
DF	(Japan) Seiji Kimura	(Japan) FC Tokyo	Undisclosed	8 August 2025	
MF	(Poland) Enzo Geerts	(Netherlands) Jong PSV	Free	2 September 2025	
MF	(Morocco) Reda Laalaoui	(Morocco) FUS Rabat	Undisclosed	8 September 2025	
FW	(Kosovo) Eliot Bujupi	(Germany) VfB Stuttgart II	Loan	8 September 2025	
FW	(Portugal) Afonso Patrão	(Portugal) Sporting Braga	€220,000	28 January 2026	
DF	(France) Clinton Nsiala	(Scotland) Rangers	Loan	2 February 2026	

=== Transfers Out ===
Pos.	Player	Transferred to	Fee	Date	Source
MF	(England) Alfie Devine	(England) Tottenham Hotspur	Loan return	30 June 2025	
FW	(Algeria) Islam Slimani	(Algeria) CR Belouizdad	Loan return	30 June 2025	
DF	(Croatia) Luka Vušković	(Croatia) Hajduk Split	Loan return	30 June 2025	
MF	(Australia) Rhys Youlley	(Australia) Sydney FC	Free	1 July 2025	
MF	(Turkey) Muhammed Gümüşkaya	(Turkey) Bandırmaspor	Undisclosed	3 July 2025	
DF	(Bulgaria) Edisson Jordanov	(Belgium) Beerschot	Free	10 July 2025	
DF	(Australia) Jordan Bos	(Netherlands) Feyenoord	€5,000,000	25 July 2025	
FW	(Croatia) Matija Frigan	(Italy) Parma	€10,000,000	15 August 2025	
GK	(Belgium) Nick Gillekens	(Belgium) RFC Seraing	Free	20 August 2025	
MF	(Poland) Enzo Geerts	(Belgium) KFC Houtvenne	Loan	3 September 2025	
DF	(Belgium) Rubin Seigers	(Belgium) Lommel	Free	5 September 2025	
GK	(Turkey) Sinan Bolat	(Turkey) Iğdır	Undisclosed	10 September 2025	
MF	(Spain) Antonio Cordero	(England) Newcastle United	Loan return	31 December 2025	
FW	(Scotland) Adedire Mebude	(Turkey) Çaykur Rizespor		14 January 2026	
DF	(Belgium) Tuur Rommens	(Scotland) Rangers		14 January 2026	
MF	(United States) Griffin Yow	(United States) New England Revolution		26 January 2026	
FW	(Belgium) Kyan Vaesen	(Belgium) Oud-Heverlee Leuven		2 February 2026	

== Friendlies ==
21 June 2025	Mechelen (Belgium)	3–2	(Belgium) Westerlo
11:00	Schoofs; Raman	Report	Vaesen; Yow

25 June 2025	Westerlo (Belgium)	1–3	(Cyprus) AEK Larnaca
11:00	Frigan 28'		Miličević 7'; García 62'; Naoum 90'

27 June 2025	Westerlo (Belgium)	2–1	(Belgium) Lierse
18:00	Van den Keybus; Bos	Report	Sy

5 July 2025	Westerlo (Belgium)	1–3	(Belgium) Sint-Truiden
11:00	Haj Abdallah	Report	Ferrari; Delpupo; Lambotte

11 July 2025	Westerlo (Belgium)	2–1	(Belgium) Patro Eisden Maasmechelen
11:00	Frigan 76', 80'		Rousseau 35'

16 July 2025	Westerlo (Belgium)	1–3	(Greece) Panathinaikos
20:00	Vaesen 90'		Gnezda Čerin 41'; Pellistri 56'; Bregou 84'

19 July 2025	Westerlo (Belgium)	3–1	(Turkey) Samsunspor
19:00	Rommens 39'; Ferri 50'; Van den Keybus 70'		Holse 17'

== Competitions ==
=== Overall record ===
Competition	First match	Last match	Starting round	Final position	Record							
Competition	First match	Last match	Starting round	Final position	Pld	W	D	L	GF	GA	GD	Win %
Belgian Pro League regular season	27 July 2025	22 March 2026	Matchday 1	9th place	30	10	9	11	36	40	−4	33.33
Europe play-offs	5 April 2026	23 May 2026	Matchday 1	4th place (10th overall)	10	4	1	5	14	17	−3	40.00
Belgian Cup	30 October 2025		Round of 16	Round of 16	1	0	0	1	2	3	−1	0.00
Total					41	14	10	17	52	60	−8	34.15

Source: Competitions

=== Belgian Pro League ===
==== Regular season ====
Pos	Team	Pld	W	D	L	GF	GA	GD	Pts	Qualification or relegation
7	Genk	30	11	9	10	46	47	−1	42	Qualification for the Europe play-offs
8	Standard Liège	30	11	7	12	27	35	−8	40	Qualification for the Europe play-offs
9	Westerlo	30	10	9	11	36	40	−4	39	Qualification for the Europe play-offs
10	Antwerp	30	9	8	13	31	32	−1	35	Qualification for the Europe play-offs
11	Charleroi	30	9	7	14	38	42	−4	34	Qualification for the Europe play-offs

Source: Jupiler Pro League (in Dutch)
Rules for classification: 1) Points; 2) Matches won; 3) Goal difference; 4) Goals scored; 5) Away matches won; 6) Away goal difference; 7) Away goals scored; 8) Play-off.

==== Results summary ====
Overall								Home						Away					
Pld	W	D	L	GF	GA	GD	Pts	W	D	L	GF	GA	GD	W	D	L	GF	GA	GD
30	10	9	11	36	40	−4	39	6	3	6	17	16	+1	4	6	5	19	24	−5

==== Results by round ====
Round	1	2	3	4	5	6	7	8
Ground	A	H	H	A	A	H	A	H
Result	L	W	L	L	P	W	W	L
Position	16	7	9	13				

Updated to match(es) played on 21 September 2025. Source:
A = Away; H = Home; W = Win; D = Draw; L = Loss; P = Postponed

==== Matches ====
27 July 2025 1	Anderlecht	5–2	Westerlo	Anderlecht
13:30 UTC+2	Hazard 19', 90+1'; Hey (yellow card) 23'; Degreef 37', (yellow card) 64'; Llansana (yellow card) 44'; Angulo 65'; Saliba 70'; Vázquez (yellow card) 80'		Vaesen 46', (yellow card) 71'; Van den Keybus (yellow card) 54'; Frigan 58'	Stadium: Constant Vanden Stock Stadium; Attendance: 19,500; Referee: Simon Bourdeaud'hui

2 August 2025 2	Westerlo	3–1	Zulte Waregem	Westerlo
16:00 UTC+2	Yow 1'; Alcócer 11'; Haspolat (yellow card) 75'; Sakamoto 82'		Erenbjerg 30'; Traoré (yellow card) 42'	Stadium: Het Kuipje; Attendance: 5,645; Referee: Bert Verbeke

9 August 2025 3	Westerlo	0–1	Mechelen	Westerlo
18:15 UTC+2	Ferri (yellow card) 25'		Halhal (yellow card) 18'; Raman 84'	Stadium: Het Kuipje; Attendance: 6,509; Referee: Michiel Allaerts

17 August 2025 4	Cercle Brugge	4–1	Westerlo	Bruges
19:15 UTC+2	Gerkens 35'; Minda 37'; Ngoura 45+1'; Adewumi 90+2'		Alcócer 70'; Bayram (yellow card) 78'	Stadium: Jan Breydel Stadium; Attendance: 4,286; Referee: Anthony Letellier

30 August 2025 6	Westerlo	2–0	Antwerp	Westerlo
18:15 UTC+2	Sakamoto 28'; Piedfort 75'		Doumbia (penalty missed) 72'	Stadium: Het Kuipje; Attendance: 5,709; Referee: Jan Boterberg

14 September 2025 7	Sint-Truiden	0–3	Westerlo	Sint-Truiden
19:15 UTC+2	Sissako (yellow card) 57'		Ferri 39'; Yow 50' (pen.); Bayram 58'; Reynolds (yellow card) 61'; Jungdal (yellow card) 67'	Stadium: Stayen; Attendance: 7,737; Referee: Bram van Driessche

21 September 2025 8	Westerlo	0–2	Standard Liège	Westerlo
16:00 UTC+2			Nielsen 24'; Abid (yellow card) 37', (goal) 40'; Lawrence (yellow card) 47'; Henry (yellow card) 84'; Karamoko (yellow card) 87'	Stadium: Het Kuipje; Referee: Kevin Van Damme

24 September 2025 5	Club Brugge	5–5	Westerlo	Bruges
20:30 UTC+2				Stadium: Jan Breydel Stadium

27 September 2025 9	Union Saint-Gilloise	2–0	Westerlo
20:45

5 October 2025 10	Westerlo	2–0	OH Leuven
19:15

18 October 2025 11	La Louvière	0–0	Westerlo
16:00

25 October 2025 12	Westerlo	1–1	Dender
16:00

2 November 2025 13	Westerlo	0–1	Genk
13:30

8 November 2025 14	Charleroi	2–0	Westerlo
18:15

22 November 2025 15	Westerlo	0–0	Gent
18:15

29 November 2025 16	Dender	2–2	Westerlo
16:00

7 December 2025 17	Westerlo	4–0	Anderlecht
16:00

14 December 2025 18	Genk	1–1	Westerlo
19:15

20 December 2025 19	Westerlo	2–1	La Louvière
18:15

27 December 2025 20	Gent	2–0	Westerlo
20:45

17 January 2026 21	Westerlo	0–2	Cercle Brugge
18:15

25 January 2026 22	Mechelen	1–1	Westerlo
19:15

31 January 2026 23	Zulte Waregem	0–1	Westerlo
18:15

6 February 2026 24	Westerlo	0–4	Sint-Truiden
20:45

15 February 2026 25	Antwerp	0–2	Westerlo
16:00

22 February 2026 26	Westerlo	2–1	Charleroi
19:15

1 March 2026 27	Westerlo	0–0	Union Saint-Gilloise
16:00

7 March 2026 28	OH Leuven	0–1	Westerlo
16:00

14 March 2026 29	Westerlo	1–2	Club Brugge
20:45

22 March 2026 30	Standard Liège	0–0	Westerlo
18:30

==== Europe play-offs ====
Pos	Team	Pld	W	D	L	GF	GA	GD	Pts
2	Standard Liège	10	5	2	3	17	11	+6	37
3	Charleroi	10	5	2	3	12	8	+4	34
4	Westerlo	10	4	1	5	14	17	−3	33
5	Antwerp	10	4	1	5	12	16	−4	31
6	OH Leuven	10	1	3	6	9	17	−8	23

Source: Jupiler Pro League (in Dutch), Soccerway
Rules for classification: 1) Points; 2) Points without (possible) half points added due to rounding; 3) Regular season finishing position.

Round	1	2	3	4	5	6	7	8	9	10
Ground	H	A	H	A	H	H	A	A	H	A
Result	W	W	L	W	L	D	L	W	L	L
Position										

A = Away; H = Home; W = Win; D = Draw; L = Loss

5 April 2026 1	Westerlo	2–0	Charleroi	Westerlo
18:30	Bayram 34' (pen.); Ferri 79'		Camara (yellow card) 54' (yellow-red card) 60'

11 April 2026 2	Standard Liège	1–2	Westerlo	Liège
18:15	Homawoo (red card) 65'; Nkada 76'		Ferri 10'; Ourega 85'

18 April 2026 3	Westerlo	1–2	Genk	Westerlo
18:15	Patrão 76'		El Ouahdi 68'; Bibout 71'

21 April 2026 4	OH Leuven	0–2	Westerlo	Leuven
20:30			Ferri 62', 67'

25 April 2026 5	Westerlo	2–4	Antwerp	Westerlo
20:45				Stadium: Het Kuipje; Referee: Nicolas Laforge

2 May 2026 6	Westerlo	3–3	OH Leuven	Westerlo
16:00				Stadium: Het Kuipje

10 May 2026 7	Genk	3–0	Westerlo	Genk
19:15				Stadium: Cegeka Arena

16 May 2026 8	Charleroi	0–1	Westerlo	Charleroi
16:00

19 May 2026 9	Westerlo	1–2	Standard Liège	Westerlo
20:30				Stadium: Het Kuipje

23 May 2026 10	Antwerp	2–0	Westerlo	Antwerp
20:45

=== Belgian Cup ===
30 October 2025 Round of 16	Beerschot	3–2	Westerlo	Antwerp
20:30
