= Adnane Messad-Kouchiche =

Belgian footballer (born 2005)

Personal information
- Date of birth: 21 November 2005 (age 20)
- Place of birth: Belgium
- Position: Striker

Team information
- Current team: Schaerbeek
- Number: 20

Youth career
- 2019–2022: Anderlecht
- 2022–2024: RWD Molenbeek

Senior career*
Years	Team	Apps	(Gls)
2024–2025	RWDM Brussels	1	(0)
2025–	Schaerbeek	6	(0)
- * Club domestic league appearances and goals as of 7 December 2025

Adnane Messad-Kouchiche (born 21 November 2005) is a Belgian footballer who plays for Schaerbeek in the Belgian Division 1.

== Club career ==
In the summer of 2024, Messad-Kouchiche was included in the RWD Molenbeek professional team pre-season squad. He made his professional debut for the club a few weeks later, on 17 August 2023, coming as a substitute against Patro Eisden.

== Personal life ==
Messad-Kouchiche is of Algerian descent.
