= Hong Seok-ju =

South Korean footballer (born 2003)

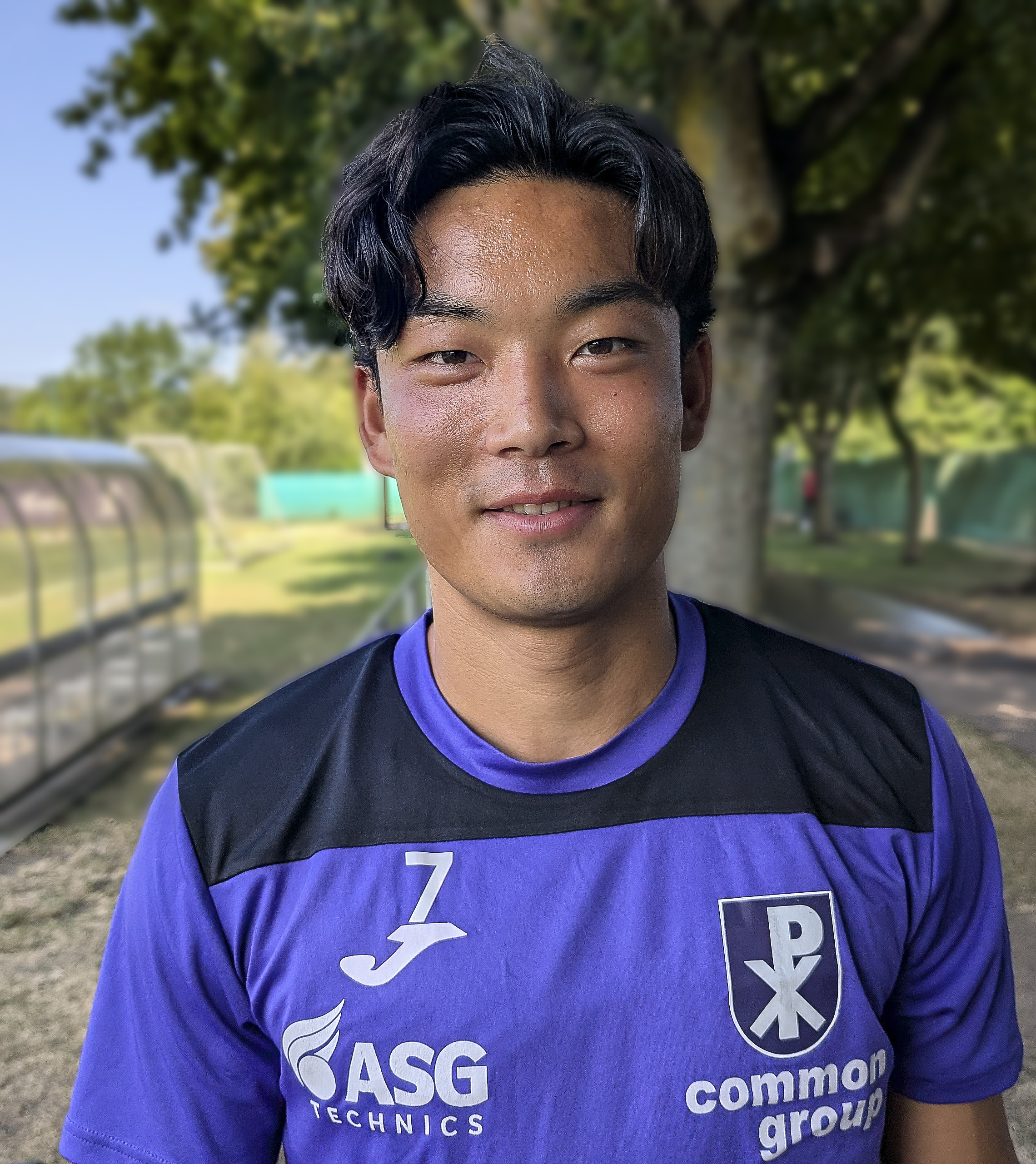
- Hong in 2026

Personal information
- Date of birth: 7 May 2003 (age 23)
- Place of birth: Seoul, South Korea
- Height: 1.87 m (6 ft 2 in)
- Position: Centre-forward

Team information
- Current team: Patro Eisden
- Number: 7

Youth career
- 2015–2018: Seoul E-Land
- 2018–2019: SV Bergisch Gladbach 09
- 2019–2020: SV Deutz 05
- 2020–2021: Viktoria Köln

Senior career*
Years	Team	Apps	(Gls)
2021–2024	Viktoria Köln	52	(4)
2024–2025	Schalke 04 II	26	(3)
2025–2026	Rot-Weiß Oberhausen	32	(8)
2026–	Patro Eisden	6	(1)
- * Club domestic league appearances and goals as of 20 September 2026

Hong Seok-ju (born 7 May 2003) is a South Korean professional footballer who plays as a centre-forward for Challenger Pro League club Patro Eisden in Belgium.

== Career ==
Born in Seoul, South Korea, Hong left South Korea for Germany in 2018 at the age of 15. In Germany, he played youth football for SV Bergisch Gladbach 09 and SV Deutz 05.

In 2020 Hong moved from Deutz to Viktoria Köln, where he initially played for the under-19 team in the Under 19 Bundesliga West. On 24 August 2021, he made his starting debut for Viktoria Köln's first team in the 3. Liga, in a 3–0 loss against 1860 Munich.

In April 2024, it was announced Hong would join Regionalliga West side Schalke 04 II in the summer for the 2024–25 season.

== Career statistics ==
As of 4 June 2026

Appearances and goals by club, season and competition
Club	Season	League			Cup		Total	
Club	Season	Division	Apps	Goals	Apps	Goals	Apps	Goals
Viktoria Köln	2021–22	3. Liga	23	2	0	0	23	2
Viktoria Köln	2022–23	3. Liga	15	2	0	0	15	2
Viktoria Köln	2023–24	3. Liga	14	0	0	0	14	0
Viktoria Köln	Total		52	4	0	0	52	4
Schalke 04 II	2024–25	Regionalliga West	26	3	—		26	3
Rot-Weiß Oberhausen	2025–26	Regionalliga West	32	8	0	0	32	8
Career total			110	15	0	0	110	15
