= William Simba =

Belgian footballer

Personal information
- Date of birth: 26 March 2001 (age 25)
- Place of birth: Brussels, Belgium
- Height: 1.94 m (6 ft 4 in)
- Position: Centre-back

Team information
- Current team: Virton
- Number: 25

Youth career
- –2021: Mouscron

Senior career*
Years	Team	Apps	(Gls)
2021–2022	Mouscron	9	(0)
2022–2024	Club NXT	40	(0)
2024–2025	Patro Eisden	18	(1)
2026	Milsami Orhei	2	(0)
2026–	Virton	2	(0)
- * Club domestic league appearances and goals as of 2 September 2026

William Simba (born 26 March 2001) is a Belgian professional footballer who plays as a centre-back for Challenger Pro League club Virton.

== Career ==
In September 2024, Simba signed for Challenger Pro League club Patro Eisden on a two-year contract. On 21 August 2025, the contract was mutually terminated.
