= Nacho Ferri =

Spanish footballer (born 2004)

Personal information
- Full name: Ignacio Ferri Julià
- Date of birth: 5 October 2004 (age 22)
- Place of birth: Montaverner, Spain
- Height: 1.92 m (6 ft 4 in)
- Position: Striker

Team information
- Current team: Feyenoord
- Number: 19

Youth career
- 2011–2012: Montaverner
- 2012–2017: Ontinyent
- 2017–2021: Alzira
- 2021–2022: Eintracht Frankfurt

Senior career*
Years	Team	Apps	(Gls)
2022–2025	Eintracht Frankfurt II	52	(36)
2023–2025	Eintracht Frankfurt	8	(1)
2024–2025	→ Kortrijk (loan)	32	(8)
2025–2026	Westerlo	36	(11)
2026–	Feyenoord	11	(7)

International career^{‡}
2019	Spain U15	2	(0)
2023	Spain U19	1	(0)
- * Club domestic league appearances and goals as of 31 October 2026 ‡ National team caps and goals as of 23:26, 24 September 2023 (UTC)

Ignacio Ferri Julià (born 5 October 2004), known as Nacho Ferri, is a Spanish footballer who plays as a striker for Eredivisie club Feyenoord.

== Career ==
In 2021, Ferri joined German side Eintracht Frankfurt.

On 29 June 2024, Ferri joined Kortrijk in Belgium on loan with an option to buy.

On 8 July 2025, Ferri returned to Belgium and signed a four-year contract with Westerlo.

=== Feyenoord ===
On 30 June 2026, Ferri moved to Dutch club Feyenoord on a four-year contract.

On 13 September 2026, Ferri scored his first three goals for the club in 0–7 away win against PEC Zwolle.

== Career statistics ==
As of match played 3 November 2026

Appearances and goals by club, season and competition
Club	Season	League			National cup (Note: Includes DFB-Pokal, Belgian Cup, KNVB Cup)		Europe		Total	
Club	Season	Division	Apps	Goals	Apps	Goals	Apps	Goals	Apps	Goals
Eintracht Frankfurt II	2022–23	Hessenliga	33	26	–		–		33	26
Eintracht Frankfurt II	2023–24	Regionalliga Südwest	19	10	–		–		19	10
Eintracht Frankfurt II	Total		52	36	–		–		52	36
Eintracht Frankfurt	2023–24	Bundesliga	8	1	1	0	4 (Note: Appearances in UEFA Europa Conference League)	0	13	1
Kortrijk (loan)	2024–25	Belgian Pro League	32	8	2	0	–		34	8
Westerlo	2025–26	Belgian Pro League	36	11	1	0	–		37	11
Feyenoord	2026–27	Eredivisie	11	7	0	0	4 (Note: Appearances in UEFA Champions League)	0	15	7
Career total			139	63	4	0	8	0	152	63
