= Fadel Gobitaka =

Togolese footballer

Personal information
- Date of birth: 16 January 1998 (age 28)
- Place of birth: Berchem-Sainte-Agathe, Belgium
- Height: 1.81 m (5 ft 11 in)
- Position: Forward

Team information
- Current team: Thionville
- Number: 12

Youth career
- 2003–2010: Gosselies Sports
- 2010–2013: Charleroi
- 2013–2015: Standard Liège

Senior career*
Years	Team	Apps	(Gls)
2015–2018	Standard Liège	3	(0)
2018–2019	ASV Geel	25	(5)
2019–2020	Roda JC	2	(0)
2020–2021	Differdange 03	11	(1)
2021–2025	RAAL La Louvière	111	(17)
2025–2026	RFC Liège	13	(0)
2026–	Thionville	2	(2)

International career^{‡}
2018	Togo U23	1	(0)
- * Club domestic league appearances and goals as of 5 September 2026 ‡ National team caps and goals as of 17 May 2018

Fadel Gobitaka (born 16 January 1998) is a professional footballer who plays for Ligue 3 club Thionville. He plays as a forward. Born in Belgium, he has represented Togo at youth international level.

== Club career ==
Gobitaka is a youth exponent from Standard Liège. On 27 December 2015, he made his Belgian Pro League debut with Standard Liège against Royal Mouscron-Péruwelz.

In the summer 2019, he joined Dutch club Roda JC Kerkrade and was in the first place registered for the Jong-squad. However, he played two games for Roda in the Eerste Divisie. In May 2020 it was confirmed, that Gobitaka would join FC Differdange 03 from the 2020–21 season.

On 1 September 2021, Gobitaka joined RAAL La Louvière on a one-year deal. After promotion to the Belgian National Division 1 was secured, he signed a contract extension until 2023.

== International career ==
Gobitaka was born in Belgium and is of Togolese descent. Gobitaka made his professional debut for the Togo U23s in a 5–0 friendly loss to the Ivory Coast U23s on 37 March 2018.
