= Nathan Huygevelde =

Belgian footballer (born 2004)

Personal information
- Full name: Nathan Gauthier Huygevelde
- Date of birth: 23 January 2004 (age 22)
- Place of birth: Ledegem, Belgium
- Height: 1.85 m (6 ft 1 in)
- Position: Midfielder

Team information
- Current team: Hvidovre
- Number: 22

Youth career
- 2009–2010: Olympic Ledegem
- 2010–2017: Kortrijk
- 2017–2020: Gent
- 2020–2022: Union SG U18

Senior career*
| Years | Team | Apps | (Gls) |
| 2022–2026 | Union SG U23 | 79 | (12) |
| 2023–2026 | Union SG | 2 | (0) |
| 2024–2025 | → Kortrijk (loan) | 0 | (0) |
| 2026– | Hvidovre | 2 | (0) |
- * Club domestic league appearances and goals as of 17:54, 3 September 2026 (UTC)

Nathan Gauthier Huygevelde (born 23 January 2004) is a Belgian professional footballer who plays as a midfielder for Danish 1st Division club Hvidovre.

== Early life ==
Huygevelde is from Ledegem in West Flanders. He joined the Kortrijk academy at under-7 level and stayed until under-13, and at the age of eleven won a keepie-uppie contest at the Guldensporen Stadion by controlling the ball 138 times in a minute. He moved on to the Gent academy before joining Union SG in 2020.

== Club career ==
=== Union SG ===
Huygevelde progressed through the under-18 and under-23 sides at Union SG. He signed a two-year professional contract in 2023 and made four first-team appearances under Alexander Blessin, amounting to 16 minutes of football in total.

In June 2024, Huygevelde rejoined Kortrijk on a season-long loan that included an option to buy. He did not play a first-team match for the club, which declined the option, and he returned to Union SG for the 2025–26 season to play for the reserve team in Belgian Division 1, the third tier.

=== Hvidovre ===
Huygevelde spent several weeks on trial with Danish club Hvidovre before signing a contract on 14 August 2026. The club described him as able to play both in midfield and at wing-back. Head coach Martin Retov called him a versatile and technically strong team player, and said that Hvidovre had no tradition of signing players from abroad. He made his debut the following day, playing the closing minutes of a 2–0 win at HB Køge in the Danish 1st Division.

== Career statistics ==
As of match played 30 August 2026

Appearances and goals by club, season and competition
| Club | Season | League | | | Cup | | Europe | | Other | | Total | |
| Club | Season | Division | Apps | Goals | Apps | Goals | Apps | Goals | Apps | Goals | Apps | Goals! |
|---|---|---|---|---|---|---|---|---|---|---|---|---|
| Union SG U23 | 2022–23 | Belgian Division 2 | 30 | 5 | — | | — | | — | | 30 | 5 |
| Union SG U23 | 2023–24 | Belgian Division 2 | 18 | 4 | — | | — | | — | | 18 | 4 |
| Union SG U23 | 2025–26 | Belgian Division 1 | 31 | 3 | — | | — | | — | | 31 | 3 |
| Union SG U23 | Total | | 79 | 12 | — | | — | | — | | 79 | 12 |
| Union SG | 2023–24 | Belgian Pro League | 2 | 0 | 0 | 0 | 2 (Note: One appearance in UEFA Europa League, one appearance in UEFA Conference League) | 0 | — | | 4 | 0 |
| Hvidovre | 2026–27 | Danish 1st Division | 2 | 0 | 0 | 0 | — | | — | | 2 | 0 |
| Career total | | | 83 | 12 | 0 | 0 | 2 | 0 | 0 | 0 | 85 | 12 |
