= Kevin Kis =

Belgian footballer (born 1990)

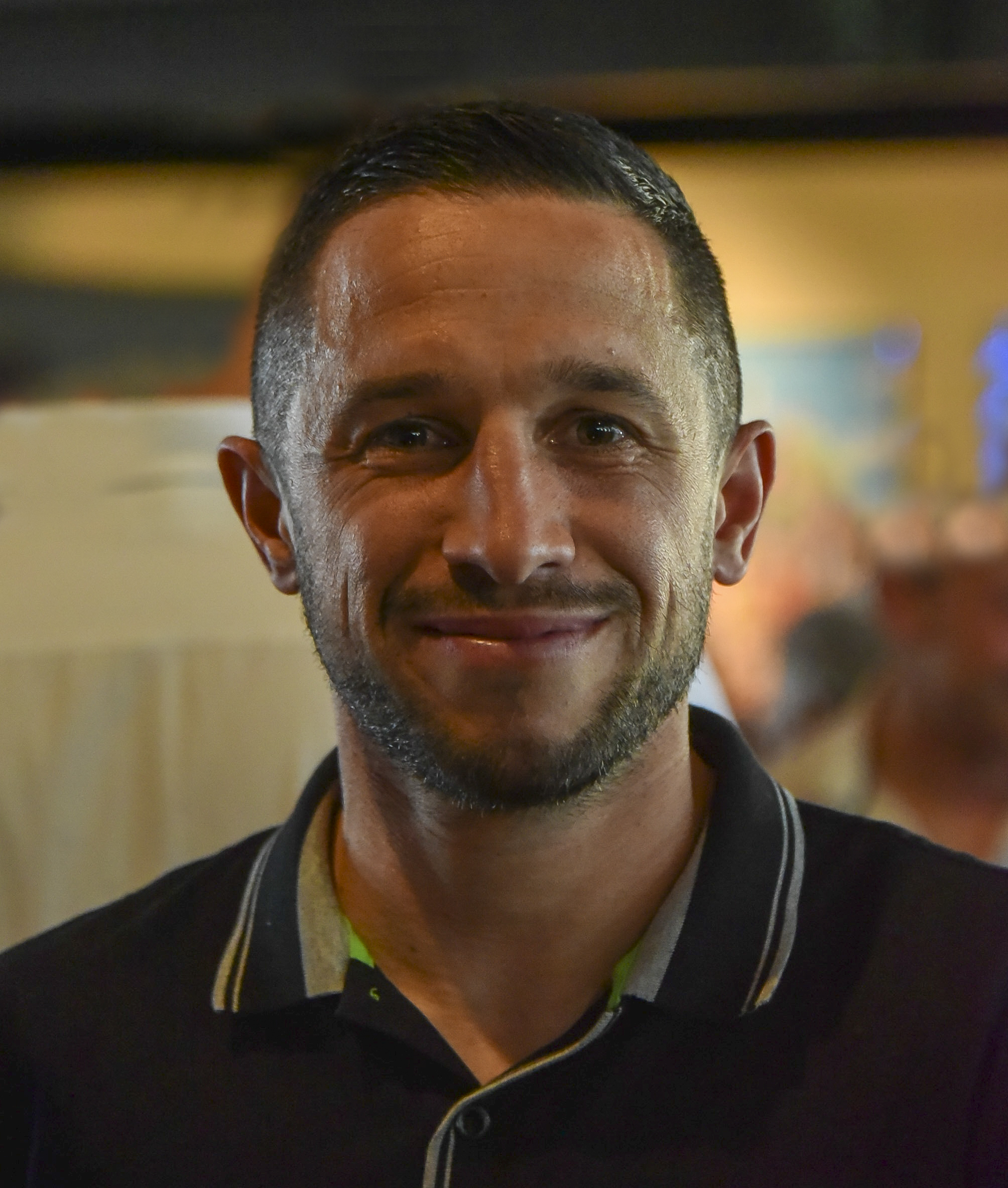

Personal information
- Full name: Kevin Nicolas Kis
- Date of birth: 26 September 1990 (age 36)
- Place of birth: Rocourt, Belgium
- Height: 1.88 m (6 ft 2 in)
- Position: Left-back

Team information
- Current team: Patro Eisden
- Number: 3

Youth career
- 1998–2005: RFC Chaudfontaine
- 2005–2006: RCS Verviétois
- 2006–2007: Genk

Senior career*
Years	Team	Apps	(Gls)
2007–2010	Genk	1	(0)
2010–2011	Westerlo	0	(0)
2011–2013	Eupen	49	(1)
2013–2015	Fortuna Sittard	69	(1)
2015–2017	Roeselare	52	(6)
2017–2020	Union SG	75	(1)
2020–2022	Lommel	46	(7)
2022–2025	Patro Eisden	88	(15)
2025–2026	Olympic Charleroi	22	(1)
2026–	Patro Eisden	4	(0)

International career^{‡}
2005	Belgium U16	8	(0)
2006–2007	Belgium U17	15	(3)
2007	Belgium U18	10	(1)
2008–2009	Belgium U19	7	(0)
- * Club domestic league appearances and goals as of 20 September 2026 ‡ National team caps and goals as of 5 June 2009

Kevin Nicolas Kis (born 26 September 1990) is a Belgian professional footballer who plays as a left-back for Challenger Pro League club Patro Eisden.

== Club career ==
Kis joined Belgian National Division 1 club Patro Eisden on 1 June 2022.

== International career ==
Kis represented Belgium at the 2007 UEFA European Under-17 Championship, where they reached semi-finals, and at the 2007 FIFA U-17 World Cup, where they were eliminated in group stage.
