= Kjetil Borry =

Belgian footballer

Personal information
- Date of birth: 16 August 1994 (age 32)
- Place of birth: Tielt, Belgium
- Height: 1.90 m (6 ft 3 in)
- Position: Centre back

Team information
- Current team: Patro Eisden
- Number: 4

Youth career
- Sporting West
- Roeselare

Senior career*
Years	Team	Apps	(Gls)
2013–2016	Roeselare	75	(3)
2016–2017	Waasland-Beveren	1	(0)
2017–2019	Roeselare	38	(2)
2019–2024	Dender EH	83	(7)
2024–	Patro Eisden	51	(5)
- * Club domestic league appearances and goals as of 20 April 2026

Kjetil Borry (born 16 August 1994) is a professional Belgian football defender who plays for Patro Eisden in the Challenger Pro League.

== Club career ==
He made his career league debut for Roeselare on 3 August 2013 in a Belgian Second Division 1–1 home draw against Mouscron.

On 24 June 2024, Borry signed a contract with Patro Eisden for one season with an option for a second.
