= Arthur Piedfort =

Belgian footballer (born 2005)

Personal information
- Date of birth: 1 February 2005 (age 21)
- Place of birth: Herentals, Belgium
- Height: 1.86 m (6 ft 1 in)
- Position: Defensive midfielder

Team information
- Current team: Auxerre
- Number: 46

Youth career
- 2010–2013: FC Gierle
- 2013–2023: PSV

Senior career*
Years	Team	Apps	(Gls)
2023	Jong PSV	1	(0)
2023–2026	Westerlo	85	(3)
2026–	Auxerre	0	(0)

International career^{‡}
2021–2022	Belgium U17	3	(0)
2022–2023	Belgium U18	4	(1)
2023–2024	Belgium U19	10	(1)
2025–	Belgium U21	4	(0)
- * Club domestic league appearances and goals as of 1 June 2026 ‡ National team caps and goals as of 15:39, 18 November 2026 (UTC)

Arthur Piedfort (born 1 February 2005) is a Belgian professional footballer who plays as a defensive midfielder for Ligue 1 club Auxerre.

== Club career ==
Piedfort began playing football with the youth of the Belgian club FC Gierle, before moving to the Netherlands with PSV's academy to finish his development. He made one appearance for Jong PSV in a 2–1 Eerste Divisie win over De Graafschap on 17 March 2023. On 30 May 2023 he transferred to the Belgian Pro League club Westerlo in the Belgian Pro League on a contract until 2027. He debuted in a 2–0 Belgian Pro League win over Oud-Heverlee Leuven 4 November 2023.

On 1 July 2026, Piedfort signed a four-year contract with Ligue 1 club Auxerre in France.

== International career ==
Piedfort was called up to the Belgium U17s for the 2022 UEFA European Under-17 Championship. On 14 March 2025 he was called up to the Belgium U21s for a set of friendlies.
