= Raoul Kenne =

Cameroonian footballer

Personal information
- Full name: Raoul Kenne Prisse
- Date of birth: 25 March 1994 (age 32)
- Place of birth: Enongal, Cameroon
- Height: 1.70 m (5 ft 7 in)
- Position: Right back

Team information
- Current team: Patro Eisden

Youth career
- Aspire

Senior career*
Years	Team	Apps	(Gls)
2012–2017	Eupen	123	(5)
2017–2018	RFC Liège	3	(0)
2018–	Patro Eisden	69	(0)
2025–2026	→ RAEC Mons (loan)	1	(0)

International career
2015	Cameroon U23	1	(0)
- * Club domestic league appearances and goals as of 20 September 2026

Raoul Kenne (born 25 March 1994) is a Cameroonian footballer who plays for Challenger Pro League club Patro Eisden in Belgium as a right back.

== Club career ==
An Aspire Academy Senegal branch youth graduate, he joined Eupen in 2012. Kenne made his professional debut in a 4–2 loss to Waasland-Beveren on 15 October 2016. However, he was forced to stop training due to cardiac arrhythmia in October 2016, and hasn't made an appearance with the first team since.

== International career ==
Kenne is a one-time youth international for the Cameroon U23s in 2015.
