= Zakaria Atteri =

Belgian footballer

Personal information
- Full name: Zakaria Dalil Atteri
- Date of birth: 11 February 2002 (age 24)
- Place of birth: Uccle, Belgium
- Height: 1.90 m (6 ft 3 in)
- Position: Forward

Team information
- Current team: Patro Eisden
- Number: 9

Senior career*
Years	Team	Apps	(Gls)
2020–2022	Mouscron	5	(0)
2022	Knokke	16	(5)
2022–2023	Dender	25	(4)
2023–2025	RFC Liège	44	(9)
2025–2026	Eupen	29	(5)
2026–	Patro Eisden	3	(1)
- * Club domestic league appearances and goals as of 20 September 2026

Zakaria Dalil Atteri (born 11 February 2002) is a Belgian professional footballer who plays as a forward for Challenger Pro League club Patro Eisden.

== Club career ==
On 6 September 2023, Atteri signed a one-season contract with RFC Liège.

On 23 July 2025, he moved to Eupen on a three-season contract. He parted company with the club on 3 September 2026 and inked a deal with fellow Challenger Pro League side Patro Eisden Maasmechelen.

== Personal life ==
Born in Belgium, Atteri is of Moroccan descent.
