= Kéres Masangu =

Belgian footballer

Personal information
- Full name: Kéres Angelau Masangu
- Date of birth: 7 March 2000 (age 26)
- Place of birth: Antwerp, Belgium
- Height: 1.85 m (6 ft 1 in)
- Position: Midfielder

Team information
- Current team: Francs Borains
- Number: 8

Youth career
- –2017: Mechelen
- 2017-2020: Roma
- 2019: → Sassuolo (loan)

Senior career*
| Years | Team | Apps | (Gls) |
| 2020–2021 | Beerschot | 0 | (0) |
| 2021 | → Šibenik (loan) | 1 | (0) |
| 2021–2023 | Virton | 42 | (1) |
| 2023–2025 | Dender EH | 12 | (0) |
| 2025–2026 | Patro Eisden Maasmechelen | 24 | (2) |
| 2026– | Francs Borains | 3 | (0) |
- * Club domestic league appearances and goals as of 18 September 2026

Kéres Angelau Masangu (born 7 March 2000) is a Belgian professional footballer who plays as a midfielder for Challenger Pro League club Francs Borains.

== Career ==
In 2017, Masangu joined the youth academy of Italian Serie A side Roma.

Before the second half of 2018–19 season, he was sent on loan to the youth academy of Sassuolo in Italy, where he suffered an injury.

In 2020, he signed for Belgian club Beerschot.

Before the second half of 2020–21 season, Masangu signed for Šibenik in Croatia.

On 9 September 2025, Masangu joined Patro Eisden Maasmechelen.
