= Jordan Renson =

Belgian footballer

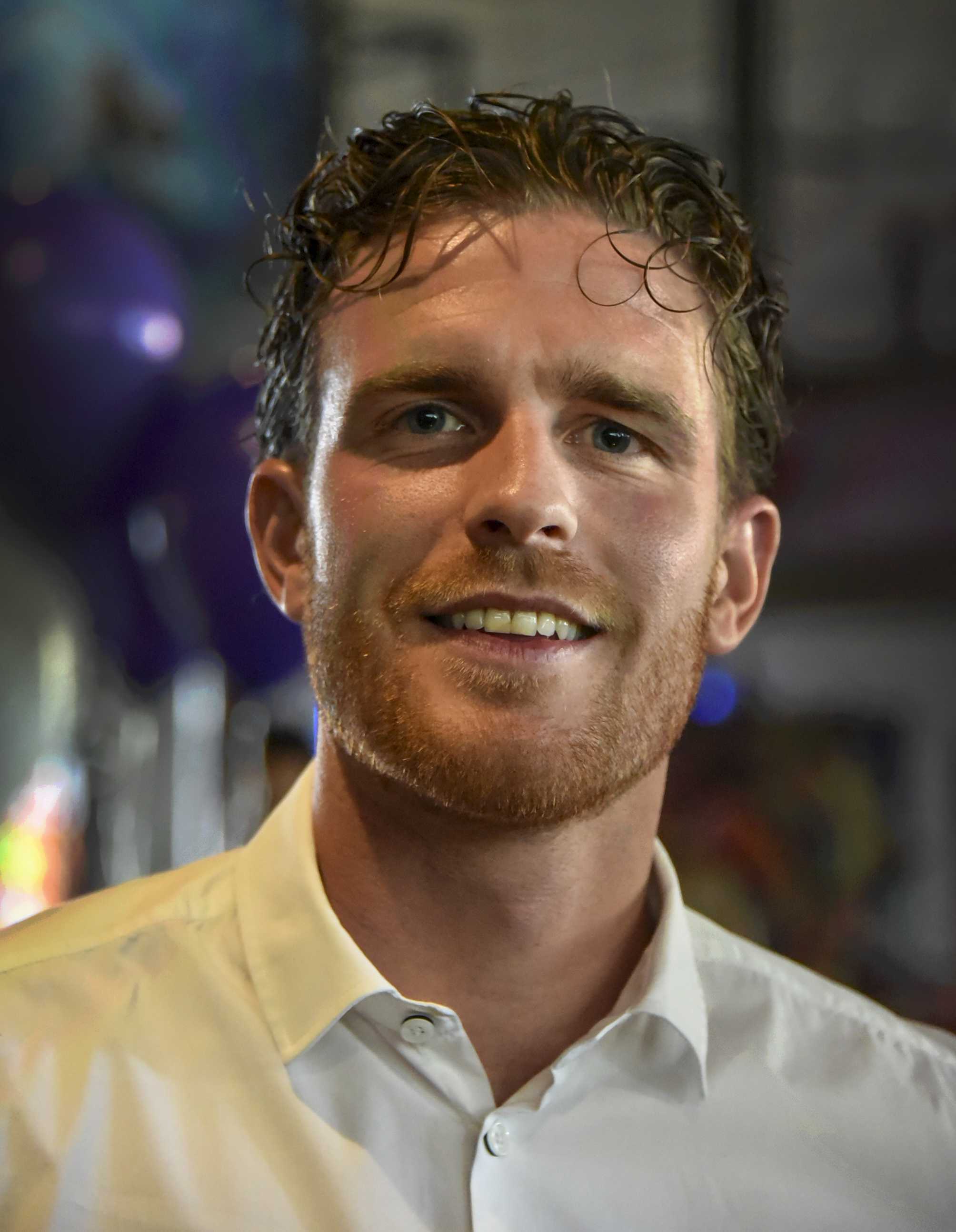

Personal information
- Date of birth: 14 May 1996 (age 30)
- Place of birth: Liège, Belgium
- Height: 1.85 m (6 ft 1 in)
- Position: Centre back

Team information
- Current team: Patro Eisden
- Number: 14

Senior career*
Years	Team	Apps	(Gls)
2015	Sint-Truiden	1	(0)
2015–2017	Club Brugge II		
2017–2018	Lommel	4	(0)
2018–	Patro Eisden	180	(19)
- * Club domestic league appearances and goals as of 20 April 2026

Jordan Renson (born 14 May 1996) is a Belgian footballer who currently plays for Patro Eisden.
