= Arnaud Dony =

Belgian footballer (born 2004)

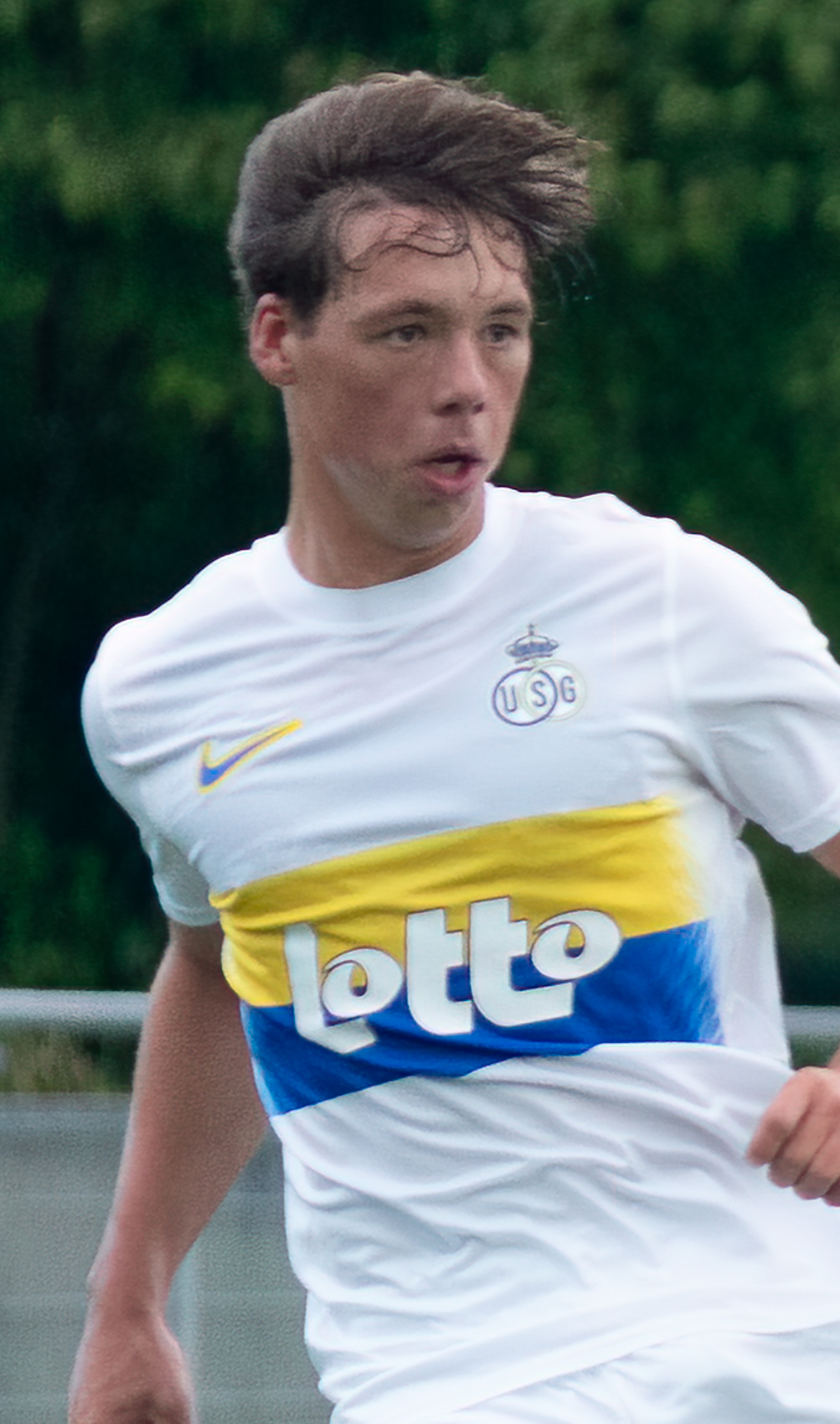
- Dony in 2024

Personal information
- Full name: Arnaud Pierre Dony
- Date of birth: 8 May 2004 (age 22)
- Place of birth: Amay, Belgium
- Height: 1.77 m (5 ft 10 in)
- Position: Left-back

Team information
- Current team: Rochefort (on loan from Patro Eisden)
- Number: 85

Youth career
- –2019: Wanze Bas-Oha
- 2019–2022: Sint-Truiden

Senior career*
Years	Team	Apps	(Gls)
2022	Sint-Truiden	3	(0)
2022–2024	Union SG	6	(0)
2022–2025	Union SG U23	50	(1)
2023	→ Dender EH (loan)	6	(1)
2025–	Patro Eisden Maasmechelen	28	(0)
2026–	→ Rochefort (loan)	5	(2)

International career^{‡}
2020	Belgium U16	2	(0)
2021–2022	Belgium U18	10	(0)
2022–2023	Belgium U19	3	(0)
2022–2023	Belgium U20	4	(0)
- * Club domestic league appearances and goals as of 30 September 2026 ‡ National team caps and goals as of 21 November 2023

Arnaud Pierre Dony (born 8 May 2004) is a Belgian professional footballer who plays as a centre-back for Belgian Division 1 club Rochefort on loan from Patro Eisden.

== Club career ==
After playing youth football for Wanze Bas-Oha, Dony joined Sint-Truiden's youth team in 2019. He made his debut for Sint-Truiden on 20 February 2022 against OH Leuven.

On 9 June 2022, Dony signed a contract with Union SG for the term of three years, with an option to extend for additional two.

On 6 September 2023, Dony was loaned by Dender EH.

On 20 June 2025, Dony moved to Patro Eisden Maasmechelen.

== International career ==
Dony made 2 appearances for the Belgium under-16 team in 2020 and 6 appearances for the Belgium under-18 team in 2021.
