= Enzo Geerts =

Polish footballer (born 2005)

Personal information
- Date of birth: 3 January 2005 (age 21)
- Place of birth: Keerbergen, Belgium
- Height: 1.81 m (5 ft 11 in)
- Position: Midfielder

Team information
- Current team: Belisia Bilzen
- Number: 18

Youth career
- KSC Keerbergen
- –2017: KV Mechelen
- 2017–2022: PSV Eindhoven

Senior career*
Years	Team	Apps	(Gls)
2022–2025	Jong PSV	36	(0)
2025–2026	Westerlo	0	(0)
2025–2026	→ KFC Houtvenne (loan)	22	(1)
2026–	Belisia Bilzen	0	(0)

International career^{‡}
2021–2022	Belgium U17	6	(0)
2022	Belgium U18	2	(0)
2024	Poland U20	1	(0)
- * Club domestic league appearances and goals as of 3 May 2026 ‡ National team caps and goals as of 18:45, 19 November 2024 (UTC)

Enzo Geerts (born 3 January 2005) is a professional footballer who plays as a midfielder for Belgian Division 1 club Belisia Bilzen. Born in Belgium, he most recently represented Poland at youth level.

== Early life ==
Geerts was a youth player at KSC Keerbergen and then KV Mechelen in his native Belgium.

== Club career ==
In 2017, Geerts joined the Dutch side PSV Eindhoven, who beat off competition from Belgian sides such as Club Brugge and Genk to secure his signing. He signed his first professional contract with PSV in July 2021. In August 2022, he signed a new three-year contract with PSV taking him up to 2025.

He made his Eerste Divisie match day squad debut on 6 January 2023 as Jong PSV played at away against NAC Breda at the Rat Verlegh Stadion. He made his senior debut on 20 January 2023 appearing as a substitute as FC Den Bosch hosted Jong PSV in the league at the De Vliert Stadium. Geerts left PSV at the end of his contract in June 2025.

On 2 September 2025, Geerts signed a multi-year deal with Belgian Pro League club Westerlo, and was subsequently loaned to KFC Houtvenne for the rest of the season.

== International career ==
Geerts was born to a Belgian father and Polish mother, and a dual-citizen after gaining a Polish passport in early 2024. He has represented Belgium at under-17 and under-18 level. In October that year, he received his first call-up to the Poland under-20s for November Elite League games against Italy and England. He earned his first cap in a 1–1 draw against the latter on 19 November.

== Career statistics ==
As of match played 21 March 2026

Appearances and goals by club, season and competition
Club	Season	League			National cup		Continental		Other		Total	
Club	Season	Division	Apps	Goals	Apps	Goals	Apps	Goals	Apps	Goals	Apps	Goals
Jong PSV	2022–23	Eerste Divisie	9	0	—		—		—		9	0
Jong PSV	2023–24	Eerste Divisie	11	0	—		—		—		11	0
Jong PSV	2024–25	Eerste Divisie	16	0	—		—		—		16	0
KFC Houtvenne (loan)	2025–26	Belgian Division 1	22	1	0	0	—		—		22	1
Career total			58	1	0	0	0	0	0	0	58	1
