= Jimmy Kaparos =

Dominican footballer (born 2001)

Personal information
- Full name: Jimmy Adrian Kaparos
- Date of birth: 25 December 2001 (age 24)
- Place of birth: Arnhem, Netherlands
- Height: 1.85 m (6 ft 1 in)
- Position: Defensive midfielder

Team information
- Current team: Patro Eisden Maasmechelen
- Number: 18

Youth career
- 2006–2011: ESCA Arnhem
- 2012–2014: FSV Waiblingen
- 2014–2017: VfB Stuttgart
- 2017–2020: Schalke 04

Senior career*
Years	Team	Apps	(Gls)
2020–2022	Schalke 04 II	55	(1)
2021	Schalke 04	1	(0)
2022–2023	PEC Zwolle	5	(0)
2023–2024	Schalke 04 II	30	(4)
2024	Schalke 04	1	(0)
2024–2025	Rot-Weiss Essen	28	(0)
2025–	Patro Eisden Maasmechelen	6	(1)

International career^{‡}
2025–	Dominican Republic	7	(1)
- * Club domestic league appearances and goals as of 9 November 2025 ‡ National team caps and goals as of 28 November 2025

Jimmy Adrian Kaparos (born 25 December 2001) is a professional footballer who plays as a defensive midfielder for Belgian Challenger Pro League club Patro Eisden Maasmechelen. Born in the Netherlands, he plays for the Dominican Republic national team.

== Career ==
Kaparos made his professional debut for Schalke 04 in the Bundesliga on 8 May 2021, coming on as a substitute in the 73rd minute for Amine Harit against 1899 Hoffenheim. The away match finished as a 4–2 loss.

He became part of the Schalke 04 II team competing in the Regionalliga for the 2021–22 season.

On 15 July 2022, PEC Zwolle announced the signing of Kaparos on a two-year contract. His contract with PEC Zwolle was terminated by mutual consent on 12 July 2023.

On 13 July 2023, he returned to Schalke 04 II.

On 24 May 2024, Kaparos signed with Rot-Weiss Essen in 3. Liga.

On 6 September 2025, Kaparos moved to Patro Eisden Maasmechelen in Belgium.

== International career ==
Kaparos was born in the Netherlands to a Greek father and a Dominican mother. He holds a Dominican Republic passport. He was called up to the Dominican Republic national team for the 2025 CONCACAF Gold Cup.

== Career statistics ==
=== Club ===
As of match played 20 May 2025

Appearances and goals by club, season and competition
Club	Season	League			Cup		Total	
Club	Season	Division	Apps	Goals	Apps	Goals	Apps	Goals
Schalke 04 II	2020–21	Regionalliga West	26	0	–		26	0
Schalke 04 II	2021–22	Regionalliga West	29	1	–		29	1
Schalke 04 II	Total		55	1	–		55	1
Schalke 04	2020–21	Bundesliga	1	0	0	0	1	0
PEC Zwolle	2022–23	Eerste Divisie	5	0	1	0	6	0
Schalke 04 II	2023–24	Regionalliga West	30	4	–		30	4
Schalke 04	2023–24	2. Bundesliga	1	0	0	0	1	0
Rot-Weiss Essen	2024–25	3. Liga	28	0	4	0	32	0
Patro Eisden	2025–26	Challenger Pro League	6	1	1	0	7	1
Career total			126	6	6	0	132	6

=== International ===
As of match played 3 November 2025

Appearances and goals by national team and year
National team	Year	Apps	Goals
Dominican Republic	2025	7	1
Total		7	1

Scores and results list Dominican Republic's goal tally first, score column indicates score after each Kaparos goal.

List of international goals scored by Jimmy Kaparos
No.	Date	Venue	Opponent	Score	Result	Competition
1	10 June 2025	Félix Sánchez Olympic Stadium, Santo Domingo, Dominican Republic	Dominica	2–0	5–0	2026 FIFA World Cup qualification
