= Patro Eisden Maasmechelen =

Belgian football club

Patro Eisden
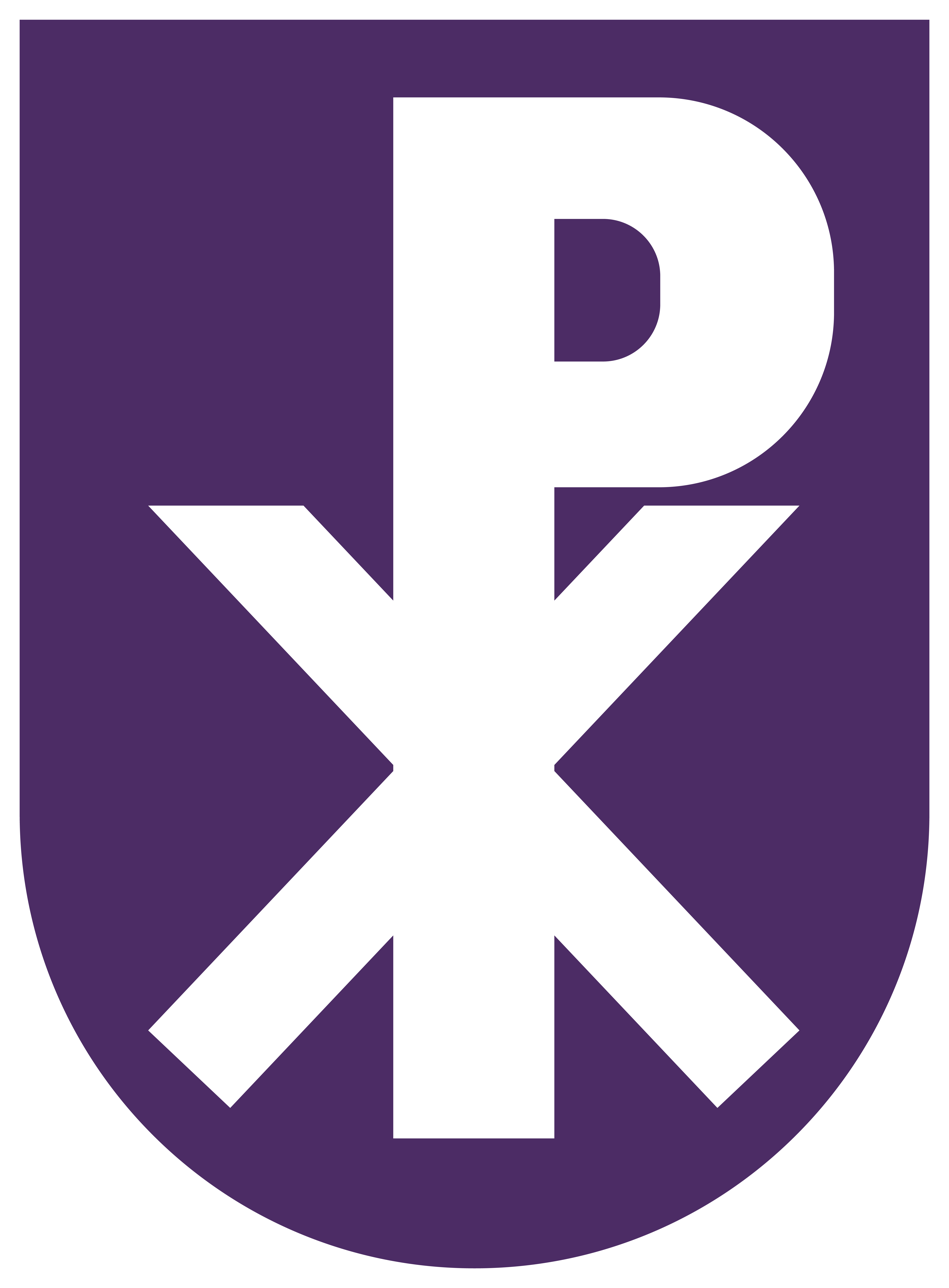
- Full name: Koninklijke Patro; Eisden Maasmechelen
- Nickname: Klein Anderlecht (Little Anderlecht)
- Founded: 1942; 84 years ago
- Ground: Gemeentelijk Sportparkstadion, Maasmechelen
- Capacity: 8100
- Chairman: Coley Parry
- Manager: Emilio Ferrera
- League: Challenger Pro League
- 2025–26: Challenger Pro League, 6th of 17
- Website: www.patroeisden.be
Home colours	Away colours

Koninklijke Patro Eisden Maasmechelen is a Belgian football club from the municipality of Maasmechelen in Limburg. The club play in Challenger Pro League, the second tier of Belgian football.

== History ==
The original club name was V.V. Patro Eisden until 1992 when it was changed to K. Patro Eisden. In 1998, it was again changed to K. Maasland Maasmechelen in the hope of gaining supporters from the whole Maasland region. In 2001 the team adopted the name K. Patro Maasmechelen after signing a deal with Roda JC.

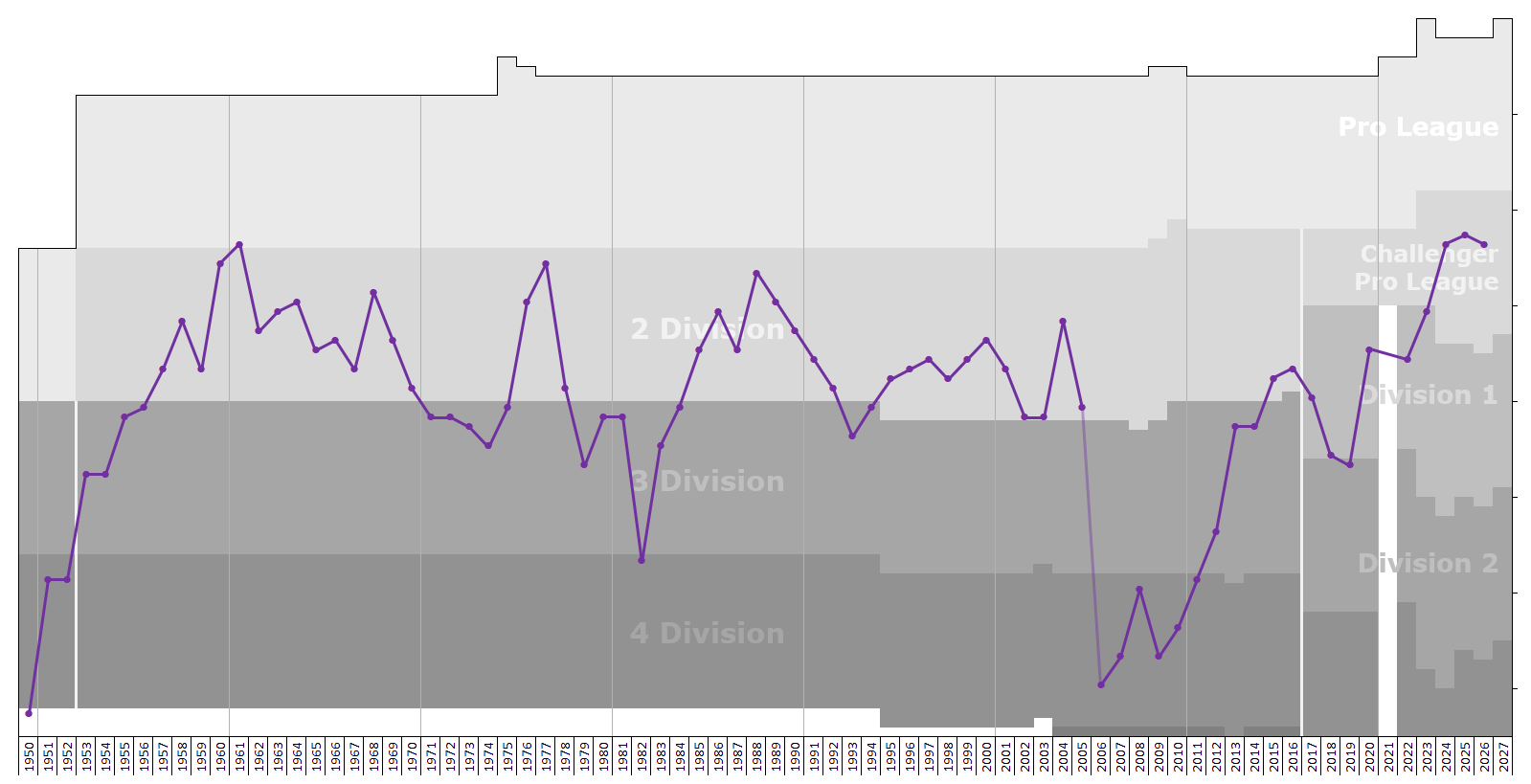
Historical chart of Patro Eisden league performance

The club finished 17th in the 2004–05 second division season but was relegated as it did not receive the professional football license. It was suggested that the club should play in the promotion (and even in provincial leagues) as it was both sportively (17th) and financially (no license) relegated but the Belgian Football Association finally decided it must play in the third division for the 2005–06 season. The FA changed the decision eventually. Following this, the club changed its name again to K. Patro Eisden Maasmechelen starting the 2005–06 season in the fourth division.

On 20 May 2023, Patro Eisden secured the title of Belgian National Division 1 2022–23 after defeating Dessel Sport 3–0 on Final Day in Matchweek 38 and was thus promoted to Challenger Pro League from 2023 to 2024.

== Current squad ==
As of 3 September 2026

Note: Flags indicate national team as defined under FIFA eligibility rules; some limited exceptions apply. Players may hold more than one non-FIFA nationality.

No.	Pos.	Nation	Player
1	GK	BEL	Jordi Berlin
2	DF	GER	Lars Dietz
3	DF	BEL	Kevin Kis
4	MF	BEL	Radja Nainggolan
5	DF	NOR	Hasan Jahić
7	FW	KOR	Hong Seok-ju
8	MF	BEL	Stef Peeters
9	FW	BEL	Zakaria Atteri
10	MF	JPN	Tsubasa Kasayanagi (on loan from V-Varen Nagasaki)
14	DF	BEL	Jordan Renson (captain)
15	MF	BEL	Sami Lahssaini
18	MF	DOM	Jimmy Kaparos
20	FW	JPN	Rento Takaoka
22	DF	TAN	Haji Mnoga

No.	Pos.	Nation	Player
24	DF	BEL	Kjetil Borry
25	FW	GER	Jan Dahlke
26	GK	ALB	Alesio Pano
27	DF	BEL	Justin Munezero
28	GK	BEL	Lars Van Parys
30	FW	TUR	Burak Sayın
33	MF	BEL	Louis Verstraete
34	MF	BEL	Tarek Loutfi
37	GK	BEL	Koen Van Langendonck
62	DF	FRA	Aloïs Penin
70	MF	GAM	Ablie Saidiba
77	FW	ARG	Isaías Delpupo
88	FW	COD	Jeremy Bokila
—	DF	CMR	Raoul Kenne

=== Out on loan ===
Note: Flags indicate national team as defined under FIFA eligibility rules; some limited exceptions apply. Players may hold more than one non-FIFA nationality.

No.	Pos.	Nation	Player
—	DF	BEL	Arnaud Dony (at Rochefort until 30 June 2027)
—	DF	BEL	Benoit Olivier (at Knokke until 30 June 2027)

No.	Pos.	Nation	Player
—	FW	TUR	Hüseyin Ertürk (at Belisia Bilzen until 30 June 2027)
—	FW	BEL	Junior Mbaku-Mbabit (at Berchem Sport until 30 June 2027)

== Honours ==
- Belgian Third Division: 2022–23
- Belgian Fourth Division: 2010–11
