= List of Belgian football transfers summer 2020 =

This is a list of Belgian football transfers for the 2020 summer transfer window. Only transfers involving a team from the professional divisions are listed, including the 18 teams in the Belgian First Division A and the 8 teams playing in the Belgian First Division B.

The summer transfer window would have opened on 1 July 2020 and towards the end of August 2020, however due to postponed matches as a result of the coronavirus pandemic, the summer 2020 transfer window will open on 7 July 2020 and end on 31 August 2020, followed by an extra fall 2020 transfer window following on 7 September 2020 and closing on 5 October 2020.

Note that several transfers were announced prior to the opening date. Furthermore, players without a club may join one at any time, either during or in between transfer windows. After the transfer window closes a few completed transfers might still be announced a few days later.

== Transfers ==
Date	Name	Moving from	Moving to	Fee	Note
20 January 2020	Sven Kums	Anderlecht	Gent	Undisclosed	(Note: Kums was already on loan from Anderlecht to Gent during the 2019-20 season. The deal involved him signing for Gent permanently after the loan deal completed.)
20 January 2020	Dimitri Lavalée	Standard Liège	Mainz 05	Undisclosed	
3 February 2020	Abdelmounaim Boutouil	ASFAR	Union SG	Undisclosed	
20 February 2020	Joep Hakkens	Lommel	Witgoor Dessel	Undisclosed	
7 March 2020	Dimi Carré	Cercle Brugge	Mandel United	Undisclosed	
7 March 2020	Jérôme Mezine	Deinze	Mandel United	Undisclosed	
20 March 2020	Gilles Dewaele	Westerlo	Kortrijk	Undisclosed	
24 March 2020	Davino Liessens	Waasland-Beveren	Wetteren	Undisclosed	
28 March 2020	Koji Miyoshi	Kawasaki Frontale	Antwerp	Undisclosed	(Note: Miyoshi was already on loan from Kawasaki Frontale to Antwerp during the 2019–20 season. Antwerp activated a clause in the deal to make the transfer permanent.)
30 March 2020	Junya Ito	Kashiwa Reysol	Genk	Undisclosed	(Note: Ito was already on loan from Kashiwa Reysol to Genk since the winter 2018–19 transfer window. All parties now agreed to make the transfer permanent.)
30 March 2020	Jordi Nolle	Beerschot	Hoogstraten	Undisclosed	
31 March 2020	Nick Kuijlaars	Lierse Kempenzonen	Hoogstraten	Undisclosed	
1 April 2020	Gillian Verbrugge	Deinze	Oudenaarde	Undisclosed	
2 April 2020	Thomas Wils	Lierse Kempenzonen	Turnhout	Undisclosed	
3 April 2020	Michiel Jonckheere	Oostende	Kortrijk	Undisclosed	
6 April 2020	Wataru Endo	Sint-Truiden	VfB Stuttgart	Undisclosed	(Note: Endo was already on loan from Sint-Truiden to Stuttgart during the 2019–20 season. Stuttgart activated a clause in the deal to make the transfer permanent.)
7 April 2020	Deniz Undav	SV Meppen	Union SG	Undisclosed	
9 April 2020	Yohan Brouckaert	RWDM47	Mandel United	Undisclosed	
15 April 2020	Bernd Brughmans	Thes Sport	Lierse Kempenzonen	Undisclosed	
15 April 2020	Clément Libertiaux	Excel Mouscron	La Louvière	Free	(Note: Libertiaux was already on loan from Excel Mouscron to La Louvière during the second half of the 2019–20 season. As the loan ended, La Louvière signed Libertiaux as a free agent player.)
15 April 2020	Ben Santermans	Lommel	Lierse Kempenzonen	Free	(Note: Santermans was already on loan from Lommel to Lierse Kempenzonen during the second half of the 2019–20 season. As the loan ended, Lierse Kempenzonen signed Santermans as a free agent player.)
17 April 2020	Yentl Van Genechten	Westerlo	Lierse Kempenzonen	Free	(Note: Van Genechten was on loan from Westerlo to Thes Sport during the 2019–20 season. The loan ended and Van Genechten was now sold to Lierse Kempenzonen.)
19 April 2020	Matthiece Nelissen	Lierse Kempenzonen	Hasselt	Undisclosed	
20 April 2020	Jarno De Smet	Beerschot	Lierse Kempenzonen	Free	
20 April 2020	Jordi Maus	Lierse Kempenzonen	Hasselt	Undisclosed	
20 April 2020	Emile Samyn	Roeselare	Lierse Kempenzonen	Free	(Note: Samyn was already on loan from Roeselare to Lierse Kempenzonen during the 2019–20 season. All parties agreed to make the transfer permanent.)
21 April 2020	Mathéo Parmentier	Lokeren	Gent	Free	
25 April 2020	Tim Siekman	Lommel	HHC Hardenberg	Free	
1 May 2020	Anthony Cabeke	RWDM47	Asse-Zellik	Free	
1 May 2020	Geoffrey Cabeke	RWDM47	Asse-Zellik	Free	
2 May 2020	Cyronn De Wilde	Antwerp	Lokeren-Temse	Undisclosed	
2 May 2020	Yarne Lenaerts	Lommel	Hades	Undisclosed	
4 May 2020	Ilias Takidine	Genk	Anderlecht	Undisclosed	
5 May 2020	Kobe Pieters	Deinze	Dikkelvenne	Undisclosed	
7 May 2020	Chris Durkin	D.C. United	Sint-Truiden	Undisclosed	(Note: Durkin was already on loan from D.C. United to Sint-Truiden during the 2019–20 season. All parties agreed to make the transfer permanent.)
9 May 2020	Bart Goossens	Deinze	Lokeren-Temse	Undisclosed	
10 May 2020	Thomas Rosala	Lierse Kempenzonen	Patro Eisden Maasmechelen	Undisclosed	
11 May 2020	Davy Roef	Anderlecht	Gent	Undisclosed	
19 May 2020	Jordan Botaka	Sint-Truiden	Gent	Undisclosed	
19 May 2020	Nathan Rodes	Charleroi	RFC Liège	Undisclosed	(Note: Rodes was on loan from Charleroi to Union Titus Pétange during the 2019–20 season. The loan ended and Rodes was now sold to RFC Liège.)
21 May 2020	Eric Smith	Gent	Norrköping	Loan	
22 May 2020	Mohammed Admi	Seraing	Warnant	Undisclosed	
22 May 2020	Romain Vanboquestal	Seraing	Warnant	Undisclosed	
22 May 2020	Darko van Rie	Club Brugge	Deinze	Undisclosed	
23 May 2020	Senne Lynen	Telstar	Union SG	Undisclosed	
25 May 2020	Amine Benchaib	Lokeren	Charleroi	Free	
25 May 2020	Eboue Kouassi	Celtic	Genk	Undisclosed	(Note: Kouassi was already on loan from Celtic to Genk during the 2019–20 season. Genk activated a buy clause to make the deal permanent.)
25 May 2020	Tracy Mpati	Lokeren	RWDM47	Free	
27 May 2020	Yadi Bangoura	RFC Liège	RWDM47	Free	
27 May 2020	Ianis Hagi	Genk	Rangers	Undisclosed	(Note: Hagi was already on loan from Genk to Rangers during the second half of the 2019–20 season. Rangers activated a buy clause to make the deal permanent.)
28 May 2020	Benjamin Bambi	OH Leuven	Tubize	Undisclosed	
28 May 2020	Daniel Muñoz	Atlético Nacional	Genk	Undisclosed	
28 May 2020	Bob Straetman	Lokeren	Lierse Kempenzonen	Free	
29 May 2020	Ilias Hamdi	Deinze	Patro Eisden Maasmechelen	Undisclosed	
29 May 2020	Sigurd Hauso Haugen	Union SG	Aalesund	Undisclosed	
29 May 2020	Simon Van Geet	ASV Geel	Lierse Kempenzonen	Free	
30 May 2020	Francesco Forte	Waasland-Beveren	Juve Stabia	Undisclosed	(Note: Forte was already on loan from Waasland-Beveren to Juve Stabia during the 2019–20 season. Juve Stabia activate a buy clause to make the deal permanent.)
30 May 2020	Eduard Sobol	Shakhtar Donetsk	Club Brugge	Loan Extended	(Note: Sobol was already on loan from Shakhtar Donetsk to Club Brugge during the 2019–20 season. All parties agreed to extend the loan deal with one more season.)
1 June 2020	Matias Lloci	Gent	Westerlo	Undisclosed	
4 June 2020	Billal Chibani	Excel Mouscron	Nantes	Undisclosed	
4 June 2020	Ibrahim El Ansri	Thes Sport	Lierse Kempenzonen	Undisclosed	
5 June 2020	Paolino Bertaccini	Deinze	Wacker Innsbruck	Undisclosed	(Note: Bertaccini was already on loan from Deinze to Wacker Innsbruck during the second half of the 2019–20 season. The loan ended but all parties agreed to make the transfer permanent.)
5 June 2020	Tuur Dierckx	Waasland-Beveren	Westerlo	Undisclosed	
5 June 2020	Tom Jurdan	Seraing	Stockay	Undisclosed	
5 June 2020	Logan Ndenbe	Oostende	Guingamp	Undisclosed	
5 June 2020	Serge-Philippe Raux-Yao	Auxerre	Cercle Brugge	Undisclosed	
5 June 2020	Nicolas Rommens	Roeselare	RWDM47	Free	
5 June 2020	Timon Wellenreuther	Willem II	Anderlecht	Undisclosed	
6 June 2020	Yoni Buyens	Lierse Kempenzonen	Zepperen-Brustem	Free	
7 June 2020	Wouter Corstjens	Westerlo	Patro Eisden Maasmechelen	Undisclosed	(Note: Corstjens was already on loan from Westerlo to Patro Eisden Maasmechelen during the 2019–20 season. The loan ended but all parties agreed to make the deal permanent)
8 June 2020	Amara Baby	Antwerp	Eupen	Undisclosed	
9 June 2020	Alexander Corryn	Mechelen	Cercle Brugge	Free	
9 June 2020	Bafodé Dansoko	La Louvière Centre	Deinze	Undisclosed	
9 June 2020	Tibo Herbots	Sint-Truiden	Union SG	Undisclosed	
9 June 2020	Siebe Paesen	Lommel	Patro Eisden Maasmechelen	Undisclosed	
10 June 2020	Théo Defourny	Lokeren	Eupen	Free	
10 June 2020	Pietro Perdichizzi	Union SG	Westerlo	Undisclosed	
11 June 2020	Andriy Batsula	Kortrijk	Dinamo Minsk	Loan	
11 June 2020	Tom Ghislain	Lommel	Dessel Sport	Undisclosed	
11 June 2020	Gertjan Martens	RWDM47	Knokke	Undisclosed	(Note: Martens was on loan from RWDM47 to Eendracht Aalst during the second half of the 2019–20 season. The loan ended and Martens was sold to Knokke.)
11 June 2020	Moussa Sissako	Paris Saint-Germain	Standard Liège	Undisclosed	(Note: Sissako was already on loan from Paris Saint-Germain to Standard Liège during the 2019–20 season. Standard Liège activated a buy clause to make the deal permanent.)
11 June 2020	Jasper Sols	Lierse Kempenzonen	Dessel Sport	Undisclosed	
11 June 2020	Abdoul Fessal Tapsoba	ASEC Mimosas	Standard Liège	Undisclosed	(Note: Tapsoba was already on loan from ASEC Mimosas to Standard Liège during the 2019–20 season. Standard Liège activated a buy clause to make the deal permanent.)
12 June 2020	Jean Butez	Excel Mouscron	Antwerp	Undisclosed	
12 June 2020	Antoine Bernier	Antwerp	Seraing	Undisclosed	(Note: Bernier was on loan from Antwerp to F91 Dudelange during the 2019–20 season. The loan ended and Bernier was sold to Seraing.)
12 June 2020	Soufiane El Banouhi	Union SG	Deinze	Free	
12 June 2020	Gaël Kakudji	Antwerp	Seraing	Undisclosed	
12 June 2020	Daniel Opare	Antwerp	Zulte Waregem	Free	
15 June 2020	Seppe Brulmans	Deinze	Patro Eisden Maasmechelen	Undisclosed	
15 June 2020	Rik De Kuyffer	Lommel	Knokke	Undisclosed	(Note: De Kuyffer was on loan from Lommel to Berchem Sport during the second half of the 2019–20 season. The loan ended and De Kuyffer was sold to Knokke.)
15 June 2020	Guillaume Dietsch	Metz	Seraing	Loan	
15 June 2020	Yann Godart	Metz	Seraing	Loan	
15 June 2020	Sami Lahssaini	Metz	Seraing	Loan	
15 June 2020	Aboubacar Lô	Metz	Seraing	Loan	
15 June 2020	Georges Mikautadze	Metz	Seraing	Loan	
15 June 2020	Amadou Dia N'Diaye	Metz	Seraing	Loan	
15 June 2020	Tom Reyners	Genk	Waasland-Beveren	Undisclosed	
15 June 2020	Dario Van den Buijs	Heracles	Beerschot	Free	
16 June 2020	Mathieu Cornet	Mechelen	Patro Eisden Maasmechelen	Undisclosed	
16 June 2020	Birger Vandael	Lommel	Zonhoven	Loan	
17 June 2020	Maxime Electeur	RFC Liège	RWDM47	Undisclosed	
17 June 2020	Andy Najar	Anderlecht	Los Angeles FC	Undisclosed	
17 June 2020	Marlon Van Oost	Kortrijk	Harelbeke	Undisclosed	
19 June 2020	Valentin Baume	Charleroi	Francs Borains	Undisclosed	(Note: Baume was on loan from Charleroi to RWDM47 during the 2019–20 season. The loan ended and Baume was now sold to Francs Borains.)
19 June 2020	Roman Ferber	Union SG	Francs Borains	Loan	
20 June 2020	Marko Kvasina	Mattersburg	Oostende	Undisclosed	
20 June 2020	Yannick Verbist	Westerlo	Heist	Undisclosed	(Note: Verbist was already on loan from Westerlo to Heist during the 2019–20 season. All parties agreed to make the transfer permanent.)
20 June 2020	Birger Verstraete	1. FC Köln	Antwerp	Loan	
21 June 2020	Timo Cauwenberg	Lommel	Lierse Kempenzonen	Undisclosed	
23 June 2020	Elton Acolatse	Sint-Truiden	Hapoel Be'er Sheva	Undisclosed	(Note: Acolatse was already on loan from Sint-Truiden to Hapoel Be'er Sheva during the 2019–20 season. All parties agreed to make the transfer permanent.)
24 June 2020	Omid Noorafkan	Charleroi	Sepahan	Undisclosed	(Note: Noorafkan was already on loan from Charleroi to Sepahan during the 2019–20 season. All parties agreed to make the transfer permanent.)
24 June 2020	Jaan Vanwildemeersch	RWDM47	Oudenaarde	Undisclosed	
25 June 2020	Dragan Lausberg	Standard Liège	Antwerp	Free	
25 June 2020	Knowledge Musona	Anderlecht	Eupen	Loan	(Note: Musona was already on loan from Anderlecht to Eupen during the second half of the 2019–20 season. The loan was extended with a further season.)
25 June 2020	Keito Nakamura	Gamba Osaka	Sint-Truiden	Loan	
25 June 2020	Stijn Wuytens	AZ Alkmaar	Lommel	Undisclosed	
26 June 2020	Houssen Abderrahmane	Louhans-Cuiseaux	RWDM47	Undisclosed	
26 June 2020	Dino Arslanagić	Antwerp	Gent	Free	
26 June 2020	Frank Boya	Excel Mouscron	Antwerp	Free	
26 June 2020	(Martinique) Thomas Ephestion	Orléans	Westerlo	Undisclosed	
26 June 2020	Núrio Fortuna	Charleroi	Gent	Undisclosed	
26 June 2020	Paul Garita	Charleroi	Villefranche	Loan	(Note: Garita was on loan from Charleroi to Boulogne during the 2019–20 season. The loan ended and Garita was loaned to Villefranche instead.)
26 June 2020	Lorenzo Offermann	La Calamine	Eupen	Undisclosed	
26 June 2020	Berke Özer	Fenerbahçe	Westerlo	Loan	(Note: Özer was already on loan from Fenerbahçe to Westerlo during the 2019–20 season. The loan was extended with a further season.)
26 June 2020	Vladimir Screciu	Genk	Universitatea Craiova	Undisclosed	(Note: Screciu was on loan from Genk to Lommel during the second half of the 2019–20 season. The loan ended and Screciu was sold to Universitatea Craiova.)
28 June 2020	Filip Krastev	Lommel	Slavia Sofia	Loan	(Note: Krastev was signed by Lommel from Slavia Sofia, but was immediately loaned back to his former team for the first six months of the 2020-21 season.)
28 June 2020	Guerric Verbrugge	Sint-Truiden	Ronse	Undisclosed	
29 June 2020	Maxime D'Arpino	Orléans	Oostende	Undisclosed	
29 June 2020	Jarno Jourquin	Kortrijk	Ronse	Undisclosed	
29 June 2020	Dylan Saint-Louis	Beerschot	Troyes	Free	
29 June 2020	Jordi Vanlerberghe	Club Brugge	Mechelen	Undisclosed	(Note: Vanlerberghe was already on loan from Club Brugge to Mechelen during the 2019–20 season. All parties agreed to make the transfer permanent.)
30 June 2020	Rocky Bushiri	Norwich City	Mechelen	Loan	(Note: Bushiri was already on loan from Norwich City to Sint-Truiden during the 2019–20 season. The loan ended but Bushiri was now loaned to Mechelen instead.)
30 June 2020	Facundo Colidio	Inter	Sint-Truiden	Loan	(Note: Colidio was already on loan from Inter to Sint-Truiden during the 2019–20 season. All parties agreed on a new loan deal for another season.)
30 June 2020	Gaëtan Coucke	Genk	Mechelen	Undisclosed	
30 June 2020	Alexandre De Bruyn	Sint-Truiden	Gent	Undisclosed	
30 June 2020	Arno Valkenaers	Mechelen	Thes Sport	Loan	
1 July 2020	Cyriel Dessers	Heracles	Genk	Undisclosed	
1 July 2020	Thibault De Smet	Sint-Truiden	Reims	Undisclosed	
1 July 2020	Florian Le Joncour	Concarneau	RWDM47	Undisclosed	
1 July 2020	Alexis Saelemaekers	Anderlecht	Milan	Undisclosed	(Note: Saelemaekers was already on loan from Anderlecht to Milan during the 2019–20 season. Milan activated a clause in the deal to make the transfer permanent.)
1 July 2020	Milan Troonbeeckx	Dessel Sport	Lommel	Undisclosed	
2 July 2020	Charlie Brown	Chelsea	Union SG	Loan	(Note: Brown was already on loan from Chelsea to Union SG during the second half of the 2019–20 season. All parties agreed to extend the loan deal with one more season.)
2 July 2020	Theo Ndicka	Lyon	Oostende	Undisclosed	
3 July 2020	François D'Onofrio	Lierse Kempenzonen	Seraing	Undisclosed	
3 July 2020	William Dutoit	Oostende	Deinze	Undisclosed	
3 July 2020	Robert Mühren	Zulte Waregem	Cambuur	Loan	(Note: Mühren was already on loan from Zulte Waregem to Cambuur during the 2019–20 season. All parties agreed to extend the loan deal with one more season.)
4 July 2020	Yannick Vandersmissen	ASV Geel	Lommel	Undisclosed	
6 July 2020	Guillaume Gillet	Lens	Charleroi	Free	
6 July 2020	Corenthyn Lavie	F91 Dudelange	RWDM47	Undisclosed	
6 July 2020	Amaury Mabika	RWDM47	Londerzeel	Undisclosed	
7 July 2020	Christian Burgess	Portsmouth	Union SG	Undisclosed	
7 July 2020	Niklo Dailly	Anderlecht	Mechelen	Undisclosed	
7 July 2020	Senna Miangué	Cagliari	Eupen	Loan	(Note: Miangué was on loan from Cagliari to Standard Liège during the 2018–19 and 2019–20 seasons. The loan ended but Miangué was now loaned to Eupen instead.)
7 July 2020	Stef Peeters	Cercle Brugge	Eupen	Undisclosed	
8 July 2020	Laurent Henkinet	OH Leuven	Standard Liège	Undisclosed	
9 July 2020	Siebe Blondelle	Eupen	Deinze	Free	
9 July 2020	Mathias De Wolf	Club Brugge	NEC	Undisclosed	
9 July 2020	Thierry Lutonda	Anderlecht	RKC Waalwijk	Loan	
10 July 2020	Youssef Boulaouali	Lierse Kempenzonen	Dessel Sport	Undisclosed	
10 July 2020	Nathan de Medina	Excel Mouscron	Arminia Bielefeld	Free	
10 July 2020	Stélvio	Virton	RWDM47	Undisclosed	
13 July 2020	Jack Hendry	Celtic	Oostende	Loan	
13 July 2020	Arjan Swinkels	Mechelen	VVV-Venlo	Free	
13 July 2020	Arthur Theate	Standard Liège	Oostende	Undisclosed	
14 July 2020	Jonathan Heris	Újpest	Eupen	Undisclosed	
14 July 2020	Guillaume Hubert	Club Brugge	Oostende	Undisclosed	(Note: Hubert was on loan from Club Brugge to Cercle Brugge during the 2019–20 season. The loan ended and Hubert was sold to Oostende.)
14 July 2020	Jérémy Huyghebaert	Excel Mouscron	FC U Craiova	Free	
14 July 2020	Frederik Jäkel	RB Leipzig	Oostende	Loan	
14 July 2020	Raphaël Lecomte	Virton	Deinze	Undisclosed	
14 July 2020	Manfred Ugalde	Deportivo Saprissa	Lommel	Undisclosed	
15 July 2020	Lenny Nangis	Free Agent	RWDM47	NA	
15 July 2020	Jérémy Perbet	Charleroi	OH Leuven	Undisclosed	(Note: Perbet was already on loan from Charleroi to OH Leuven during the 2019–20 season. All parties agreed to extend the loan deal with one more season.)
16 July 2020	Nick Bätzner	VfB Stuttgart II	Oostende	Undisclosed	
16 July 2020	Laurens De Bock	Leeds	Zulte Waregem	Loan	
16 July 2020	Kyan Vaesen	Westerlo	Thes Sport	Loan	
16 July 2020	Arno Verschueren	NAC Breda	Lommel	Undisclosed	
16 July 2020	Julio Vinicius	Gareji	Gent	Undisclosed	
17 July 2020	Adil El Attabi	Westerlo	Heist	Loan	
17 July 2020	Maxim Versteeven	Westerlo	Houtvenne	Loan	
19 July 2020	Saad Agouzoul	Lille	Excel Mouscron	Loan	
19 July 2020	Philip Azango	Gent	Trenčín	Undisclosed	
19 July 2020	Eric Junior Bocat	Lille	Excel Mouscron	Loan	
19 July 2020	Charles-Andreas Brym	Lille	Excel Mouscron	Loan	
19 July 2020	Mohamed Buya Turay	Sint-Truiden	Hebei China Fortune	Undisclosed	
19 July 2020	Noah Fadiga	Club Brugge	Heracles	Undisclosed	(Note: Fadiga was on loan from Club Brugge to Volendam during the 2019–20 season. The loan ended and Fadiga was now sold to Heracles.)
19 July 2020	Imad Faraj	Lille	Excel Mouscron	Loan	
19 July 2020	El Hadji Gueye	Lille	Excel Mouscron	Loan	
19 July 2020	Darly N'Landu	Lille	Excel Mouscron	Loan	
19 July 2020	Jean Onana	Lille	Excel Mouscron	Loan	
19 July 2020	Virgiliu Postolachi	Lille	Excel Mouscron	Loan	
19 July 2020	Benoît Poulain	Free Agent	Eupen	NA	
19 July 2020	Agim Zeka	Lille	Excel Mouscron	Loan	
20 July 2020	Beni Badibanga	Waasland-Beveren	Excel Mouscron	Free	
20 July 2020	Joseph Efford	Ergotelis	Waasland-Beveren	Undisclosed	
20 July 2020	Harlem Gnohéré	Steaua Bucharest	Excel Mouscron	Free	
20 July 2020	Matías Silvestre	Livorno	Excel Mouscron	Free	
20 July 2020	Thomas Wildemeersch	Charleroi	La Louvière	Free	(Note: Wildemeersch was on loan from Charleroi to Francs Borains during the 2019–20 season. The loan ended and Wildemeersch was now sold to La Louvière.)
21 July 2020	Lior Inbrum	Gent	Maccabi Petah Tikva	Free	(Note: Inbrum was already on loan from Gent to Maccabi Petah Tikva during the second half of the 2019-20 season. With the end of the loan deal, Inbrums contract at Gent also ended, allowing him to move to Maccabi Petah Tikva on a permanent basis.)
21 July 2020	Loïs Openda	Club Brugge	Vitesse	Loan	
21 July 2020	Brendan Schoonbaert	Club Brugge	Waasland-Beveren	Undisclosed	(Note: Schoonbaert was on loan from Club Brugge to Deinze during the 2019–20 season. The loan ended and Schoonbaert was now sold to Waasland-Beveren.)
21 July 2020	Dries Wuytens	Sektzia Nes Tziona	Waasland-Beveren	Undisclosed	
22 July 2020	Alessandro Albanese	Eintracht Frankfurt	Waasland-Beveren	Free	
22 July 2020	Niklas Dorsch	1. FC Heidenheim	Gent	Undisclosed	
22 July 2020	Jo Gilis	OH Leuven	Lierse Kempenzonen	Loan	
24 July 2020	Nill De Pauw	Atromitos	Antwerp	Free	
24 July 2020	Jan Van den Bergh	Gent	Beerschot	Undisclosed	(Note: Van den Bergh was on loan from Gent to OH Leuven during the second half of the 2019–20 season. The loan ended and Van den Bergh was now sold to Beerschot.)
25 July 2020	Valtteri Moren	Waasland-Beveren	HJK Helsinki	Free	
27 July 2020	Stephen Buyl	Westerlo	Roeselare	Free	
27 July 2020	Kino Delorge	Lierse Kempenzonen	Roeselare	Undisclosed	
27 July 2020	Sieben Dewaele	Anderlecht	Heerenveen	Loan	
27 July 2020	Vladimir Kovačević	Kortrijk	Vojvodina	Undisclosed	
28 July 2020	Alireza Beiranvand	Persepolis	Antwerp	Undisclosed	
28 July 2020	Bautista Cejas	Montevideo City Torque	Lommel	Loan	
28 July 2020	Makhtar Gueye	Saint-Étienne	Oostende	Undisclosed	
28 July 2020	Yehor Nazaryna	Antwerp	Zorya Luhansk	Undisclosed	(Note: Nazaryna was on loan from Antwerp to Karpaty Lviv during the 2019–20 season. The loan ended and Nazaryna was now sold to Zorya Luhansk.)
28 July 2020	Jakub Piotrowski	Genk	Fortuna Düsseldorf	Undisclosed	(Note: Piotrowski was on loan from Genk to Waasland-Beveren during the 2019–20 season. The loan ended and Piotrowski was now sold to Fortuna Düsseldorf.)
29 July 2020	Kassim Doumbia	Lierse Kempenzonen	Roeselare	Undisclosed	
29 July 2020	Issa Kaboré	Manchester City	Mechelen	Loan	(Note: Kaboré was signed by Manchester City from Mechelen, but was immediately loaned back to his former team for the 2020-21 season.)
29 July 2020	Ismael Saibari	Genk	Jong PSV	Undisclosed	
29 July 2020	Mehdi Terki	Xanthi	RWDM47	Undisclosed	
29 July 2020	Jonas Vinck	Lierse Kempenzonen	Roeselare	Undisclosed	
30 July 2020	Lennert De Smul	Deinze	Roeselare	Undisclosed	
30 July 2020	Tim Kleindienst	1. FC Heidenheim	Gent	Undisclosed	
30 July 2020	Loïc Lapoussin	Virton	Union SG	Undisclosed	
30 July 2020	Anthony Moris	Virton	Union SG	Undisclosed	
30 July 2020	Lucas Ribeiro Costa	Virton	Charleroi	Undisclosed	
30 July 2020	Dante Vanzeir	Genk	Union SG	Undisclosed	(Note: Vanzeir was on loan from Genk to Mechelen during the 2019–20 season. The loan ended and Vanzeir was now sold to Union SG.)
31 July 2020	Jordan Attah Kadiri	Östersund	Lommel	Undisclosed	
31 July 2020	Jari De Busser	Gent	Lommel	Undisclosed	
31 July 2020	Kevin Kis	Union SG	Lommel	Undisclosed	
31 July 2020	Laurent Lemoine	Mechelen	Lommel	Undisclosed	
1 August 2020	Kouakou Hervé Koffi	Lille	Excel Mouscron	Loan	
2 August 2020	Jonathan Buatu	Rio Ave	Sint-Truiden	Undisclosed	
3 August 2020	Jenthe Mertens	Go Ahead Eagles	Waasland-Beveren	Undisclosed	
3 August 2020	Bohdan Mykhaylichenko	Zorya Luhansk	Anderlecht	Undisclosed	
3 August 2020	Serge Tabekou	Union SG	Excel Mouscron	Free	
4 August 2020	Kemar Roofe	Anderlecht	Rangers	Undisclosed	
4 August 2020	Abdoulie Sanyang	Superstars Academy	Beerschot	Loan	(Note: Sanyang was on loan from Superstars Academy to Lommel during the 2019–20 season. The loan ended and Sanyang was now loaned to Beerschot instead.)
4 August 2020	Toby Sibbick	Barnsley	Oostende	Loan	
5 August 2020	Gerardo Arteaga	Santos Laguna	Genk	Undisclosed	
5 August 2020	Larry Azouni	Kortrijk	Nacional	Free	
5 August 2020	William Bianda	Roma	Zulte Waregem	Loan	
5 August 2020	Percy Tau	Brighton & Hove Albion	Anderlecht	Loan	(Note: Tau was on loan from Brighton & Hove Albion to Club Brugge during the 2019–20 season. The loan ended but Tau was now loaned to Anderlecht instead.)
6 August 2020	Jordan Faucher	Xanthi	Waasland-Beveren	Undisclosed	
6 August 2020	Luqman Hakim Shamsudin	Selangor II	Kortrijk	Undisclosed	
6 August 2020	Cameron McGeehan	Barnsley	Oostende	Undisclosed	
6 August 2020	Siemen Voet	Club Brugge	Mechelen	Loan	(Note: Voet was on loan from Club Brugge to Roeselare during the 2019–20 season. The loan ended but Voet was now loaned to Mechelen instead.)
6 August 2020	Ivan Yagan	Mariehamn	RWDM47	Undisclosed	
7 August 2020	David Bates	Hamburger SV	Cercle Brugge	Loan	
7 August 2020	Romeni Scott Bitsindou	Lommel	Lierse Kempenzonen	Free	
7 August 2020	Mustapha Bundu	Aarhus	Anderlecht	Undisclosed	
7 August 2020	Carlinhos	Standard Liège	Vasco da Gama	Undisclosed	(Note: Carlinhos was on loan from Standard Liège to Vitória de Setúbal during the 2019–20 season. The loan ended but Carlinhos was now sold to Vasco da Gama.)
7 August 2020	Lars Dendoncker	Club Brugge	Brighton & Hove Albion	Undisclosed	
7 August 2020	Thomas Doore	Sint-Truiden	Roeselare	Undisclosed	
7 August 2020	Ivan Goranov	Levski Sofia	Charleroi	Undisclosed	
7 August 2020	Yanis Mbombo	OH Leuven	Stade Lausanne Ouchy	Undisclosed	
8 August 2020	Julien Ngoy	Stoke City	Eupen	Undisclosed	
10 August 2020	Karlo Lulić	Waasland-Beveren	Slaven Belupo	Undisclosed	(Note: Lulić was already on loan from Waasland-Beveren to Slaven Belupo during the 2019–20 season. All parties agreed to make the transfer permanent.)
10 August 2020	Mayingila N'Zuzi Mata	Red Star	RWDM47	Undisclosed	
10 August 2020	Jens Teunckens	Antwerp	AEK Larnaca	Free	
11 August 2020	Lars Bleijenberg	Antwerp	Excelsior	Free	
11 August 2020	Jonathan David	Gent	Lille	€30,000,000	
11 August 2020	Thomas Didillon	Anderlecht	Cercle Brugge	Undisclosed	(Note: Didillon was on loan from Anderlecht to Genk during the second half of the 2019–20 season. The loan ended but Didillon was now sold to Cercle Brugge.)
11 August 2020	Guillaume François	Virton	Union SG	Undisclosed	
11 August 2020	Shean Garlito	RWDM47	Differdange 03	Free	
11 August 2020	Daniel Iversen	Leicester City	OH Leuven	Loan	
11 August 2020	David Mindombe	OH Leuven	Sint-Truiden	Undisclosed	
12 August 2020	Adriano	Athletico Paranaense	Eupen	Undisclosed	
12 August 2020	Neto Borges	Genk	Vasco da Gama	Loan	
12 August 2020	Bram Castro	Mechelen	Oostende	Free	
12 August 2020	Blessing Eleke	Luzern	Beerschot	Undisclosed	
12 August 2020	Pieter Gerkens	Anderlecht	Antwerp	Undisclosed	
12 August 2020	Mamadou Koné	Leganés	Eupen	Undisclosed	
12 August 2020	Jackson Muleka	TP Mazembe	Standard Liège	Undisclosed	
12 August 2020	Renato Neto	Oostende	Deinze	Free	
12 August 2020	Ronald Vargas	Oostende	Deinze	Free	
12 August 2020	Thibault Vlietinck	Club Brugge	OH Leuven	Loan	
13 August 2020	Atabey Çiçek	İstanbul Başakşehir	Westerlo	Loan	
13 August 2020	Orlando Sá	Standard Liège	Málaga	Free	
14 August 2020	Kouya Mabea	Vitória Guimarães B	Westerlo	Undisclosed	
15 August 2020	Gaétan Bosiers	Mechelen	Helmond Sport	Loan	
15 August 2020	Maxime De Bie	Mechelen	Helmond Sport	Loan	
15 August 2020	Marian Shved	Celtic	Mechelen	Loan	
15 August 2020	Alec Van Hoorenbeeck	Mechelen	Helmond Sport	Loan	(Note: Van Hoorenbeeck and Van Keilegom were on loan from Mechelen to Heist during the 2019–20 season. The loan ended but both players were now loaned to Helmond Sport instead.)
15 August 2020	Arno Van Keilegom	Mechelen	Helmond Sport	Loan	
17 August 2020	Kouadio-Yves Dabila	Lille	Excel Mouscron	Loan	(Note: Dabila was on loan from Lille to Cercle Brugge during the 2019–20 season. The loan ended and Dabila was now loaned to Excel Mouscron instead.)
17 August 2020	Bill Lathouwers	Antwerp	MVV	Undisclosed	
17 August 2020	Kerim Mrabti	Birmingham City	Mechelen	Free	
18 August 2020	Chris Bedia	Charleroi	Sochaux	Loan	(Note: Bedia was on loan from Charleroi to Troyes during the 2019–20 season. The loan ended and Bedia was now loaned to Sochaux instead.)
18 August 2020	Romain Matthys	Eupen	RWDM47	Loan	
18 August 2020	Musashi Suzuki	Hokkaido Consadole Sapporo	Beerschot	Undisclosed	
18 August 2020	Dieumerci Ndongala	Genk	APOEL	Undisclosed	(Note: Ndongala was on loan from Genk to Kasımpaşa during the second half of the 2019–20 season. The loan ended and Ndongala was now sold to APOEL instead.)
18 August 2020	Rafael Romo	Silkeborg	OH Leuven	Free	
18 August 2020	Ike Ugbo	Chelsea	Cercle Brugge	Loan	
18 August 2020	Víctor Vázquez	Umm Salal	Eupen	Free	
22 September 2020	Oleksandr Filippov	Desna Chernihiv	Sint-Truiden	€1,500,000	

=== End of 2019–20 season ===
Date	Name	Moving from	Moving to	Fee	Note
End of 2019–20 season	Alessandro Cerigioni	Lommel	Dessel Sport	Free	(Note: Cerigioni was already on loan from Lommel to Dessel Sport since the winter 2019–20 transfer windows. At the time of signing the loan agreement, Cerigioni had also signed a deal for a permanent transfer at the end of 2019–20 season.)
End of 2019–20 season	Jordi Amat	Rayo Vallecano	Eupen	Undisclosed	(Note: Amat was already on loan from Rayo Vallecano to Eupen during the 2019-20 season. All parties agreed to make the transfer permanent.)
End of 2019–20 season	Simon Bammens	Westerlo	Thes Sport	Undisclosed	(Note: Bammens was already on loan from Westerlo to Thes Sport during the 2019-20 season. All parties agreed to make the transfer permanent.)
End of 2019–20 season	Aladin Bizimana	Seraing	Herstal	Undisclosed	
End of 2019–20 season	Mauro Devos	Deinze	Zwevezele	Undisclosed	
End of 2019–20 season	Natanaël Frenoy	Standard Liège	RFC Liège	Undisclosed	(Note: Frenoy was already on loan from Standard Liège to RFC Liège during the second half of the 2019-20 season. All parties agreed to make the transfer permanent.)
End of 2019–20 season	Cédric Mateso	Westerlo	Heist	Undisclosed	(Note: Mateso was already on loan from Westerlo to Heist during the 2019-20 season. All parties agreed to make the transfer permanent.)
