= 2021–22 KV Oostende season =

K.V. Oostende
2021–22 season
- Chairman: Franck Dierckens
- Manager: Yves Vanderhaeghe
- Stadium: Diaz Arena
- Belgian First Division A: 12th
- Belgian Cup: Seventh round
- Top goalscorer: League: Makhtar Gueye (12); All: Makhtar Gueye (12)
Home colours	Away colours	Third colours
- All statistics correct as of 10 April 2022.

The 2021–22 season was the 118th season in the existence of K.V. Oostende and the club's 10th consecutive season in the top flight of Belgian football. In addition to the domestic league, K.V. Oostende also participated in this season's edition of the Belgian Cup.

== Players ==
=== First-team squad ===
As of 1 February 2022

Note: Flags indicate national team as defined under FIFA eligibility rules; some limited exceptions apply. Players may hold more than one non-FIFA nationality.

No.	Pos.	Nation	Player
1	GK	NED	Kjell Scherpen (on loan from Brighton)
3	DF	ENG	Zech Medley
4	DF	USA	Kyle Duncan
5	DF	NED	Osaze Urhoghide (on loan from Celtic)
6	MF	FRA	Maxime D'Arpino
7	DF	FRA	Théo Ndicka
8	MF	NIR	Cameron McGeehan
9	FW	SEN	Makhtar Gueye
10	MF	CPV	Kenny Rocha Santos
11	MF	BEL	Indy Boonen
15	DF	GER	Frederik Jäkel (on loan from RB Leipzig)
17	DF	CPV	Steven Fortès (on loan from Lens)
18	MF	JPN	Tatsuhiro Sakamoto (on loan from Cerezo Osaka)
19	DF	BEL	Manuel Osifo

No.	Pos.	Nation	Player
21	FW	AUT	Marko Kvasina
22	GK	BEL	Jordi Schelfhout
23	DF	GER	Alfons Amade
24	MF	BEL	Evangelos Patoulidis
26	MF	FRA	Vincent Koziello
27	DF	BEL	Brecht Capon
28	GK	BEL	Guillaume Hubert
29	MF	BEL	Robbie D'Haese
33	DF	BEL	Anton Tanghe
36	DF	BEL	Siebe Wylin
68	FW	GLP	Thierry Ambrose
77	FW	GHA	David Atanga
99	MF	BEL	Alessandro Albanese

=== Out on loan ===
Note: Flags indicate national team as defined under FIFA eligibility rules; some limited exceptions apply. Players may hold more than one non-FIFA nationality.

No.	Pos.	Nation	Player
—	DF	FRA	Thomas Basila (at Nancy)
—	DF	BEL	Arthur Theate (at Bologna)
—	MF	BEL	Sieben Dewaele (at Nancy)
—	FW	BEL	Mohamed Berte (at Den Bosch)

No.	Pos.	Nation	Player
—	FW	MTQ	Mickaël Biron (at Nancy)
—	FW	FRA	Andrew Jung (at Nancy)
—	FW	BEL	Preben Stiers (at Den Bosch)
—	FW	SEN	Mamadou Thiam (at Nancy)

== Pre-season and friendlies ==
Win Draw Loss

26 June 2021 Friendly	Voorwaarts Zwevezele (Belgium)	3–9	(Belgium) Oostende	Wingene, Belgium
16:00 CEST (UTC+2)		Report		Stadium: Sportcomplex Zwevezele

10 July 2021 Friendly	Amiens (France)	2–1	(Belgium) Oostende	Amiens, France
15:00 CEST (UTC+2)		Report		Stadium: Stade de la Licorne

17 July 2021 Friendly	Oostende (Belgium)	0–0	(Belgium) Excel Mouscron	Ostend, Belgium
12:00 CET (UTC+1)		Report		Stadium: Diaz Arena

7 October 2021 Friendly	Oostende (Belgium)	5–2	(Belgium) Zulte Waregem	Ostend, Belgium
11:00 CET (UTC+1)		Report		Stadium: Diaz Arena

11 November 2021 Friendly	Oostende (Belgium)	4–4	(Belgium) Deinze	Ostend, Belgium
12:00 CET (UTC+1)		Report		Stadium: Diaz Arena

7 January 2022 Friendly	Oostende (Belgium)	4–0	(Belgium) Sint-Eloois-Winkel	Ostend, Belgium
19:00 CET (UTC+1)		Report		Stadium: Diaz Arena

16 April 2022 Friendly	Oostende (Belgium)	1–3	(Belgium) Club Brugge	Ostend, Belgium
12:00 CEST (UTC+2)	Ambrose 9'	Report	De Ketelaere 1'; Adamyan 47'; Ricca 68'	Stadium: Diaz Arena

28 April 2022 Friendly	Oostende (Belgium)	5–3	(Belgium) Zulte Waregem	Ostend, Belgium
13:00 CEST (UTC+2)				Stadium: Diaz Arena

== Competitions ==
=== Overall record ===
Competition	First match	Last match	Starting round	Final position	Record							
Competition	First match	Last match	Starting round	Final position	Pld	W	D	L	GF	GA	GD	Win %
Belgian First Division A	24 July 2021	10 April 2022	Matchday 1	12th	34	10	7	17	34	61	−27	29.41
Belgian Cup	26 October 2021	1 December 2021	Sixth round	Seventh round	2	1	0	1	8	2	+6	50.00
Total					36	11	7	18	42	63	−21	30.56

Source: Soccerway

=== Belgian First Division A ===
==== League table ====
Pos	Team	Pld	W	D	L	GF	GA	GD	Pts
10	Cercle Brugge	34	12	9	13	49	46	+3	45
11	OH Leuven	34	10	11	13	47	58	−11	41
12	Oostende	34	10	7	17	34	61	−27	37
13	Kortrijk	34	9	10	15	43	48	−5	37
14	Standard Liège	34	9	9	16	32	51	−19	36

Source: Jupiler Pro League (in Dutch), Soccerway
Rules for classification: 1) Points; 2) Matches won; 3) Goal difference; 4) Goals scored; 5) Away matches won; 6) Away goal difference; 7) Away goals scored; 8) Play-off.

==== Matches ====
The league fixtures were announced on 8 June 2021.

24 July 2021 1	Oostende	0–3	Charleroi	Ostend
20:45 CEST (UTC+2)		Report	Bedia 7'; Zaroury 50'; Kayembe 85'	Stadium: Diaz Arena; Attendance: 2,800; Referee: Erik Lambrechts

30 July 2021 2	Genk	3–4	Oostende	Genk
20:45 CEST (UTC+2)	Heynen 20'; Bongonda 30', 60'	Report	Hendry (yellow card) 30'; Kvasina 32'; Gueye 49'; Ambrose 62'; Jäkel 79'	Stadium: Luminus Arena; Attendance: 5,069; Referee: Nathan Verboomen

8 August 2021 3	Oostende	1–0	Gent	Ostend
21:00 CEST (UTC+2)		Report		Stadium: Diaz Arena; Attendance: 2,443; Referee: Alexandre Boucaut

14 August 2021 4	Seraing	2–3	Oostende	Seraing
21:00 CEST (UTC+2)		Report		Stadium: Stade du Pairay; Attendance: 1,000; Referee: Bert Put

20 August 2021 5	Standard Liège	1–0	Oostende	Liège
20:45 CEST (UTC+2)	Siquet (yellow card) 73'; Amallah 78'; Bastien (yellow card) 88'; Peeters (yellow card) 90'; Klauss (yellow card) 90'	Report	Theate (yellow card) 77' (yellow-red card) 90+4'; Ndicka Matam (yellow card) 85'; Kvasina (yellow card) 90+1'	Stadium: Stade Maurice Dufrasne; Attendance: 16.261; Referee: Lawrence Visser

29 August 2021 6	Oostende	0–2	Zulte Waregem	Ostend
21:00 CEST (UTC+2)				Stadium: Diaz Arena

10 September 2021 7	Club Brugge	3–0	Oostende	Bruges
20:45 CEST (UTC+2)	Lang 23' 80'; Vanaken 56'		Steven Fortès (yellow card) 42' (yellow-red card) 45'; Bätzner (yellow card) 48'; Gueye (yellow card) 56'; Kenny Rocha Santos (yellow card) 70'	Stadium: Jan Breydel Stadium; Attendance: 26,000; Referee: Nathan Verboomen

18 September 2021 8	Oostende	3–1	Beerschot	Ostend
21:00 CEST (UTC+2)				Stadium: Diaz Arena

26 September 2021 9	Oostende	2–2	Anderlecht	Oostende
18:30 CEST (UTC+2)	Gueye 7' 29'; Ndicka (yellow card) 36'; Tanghe (yellow card) 90+2'		Amuzu (yellow card) 35'; Kouamé (red card) 47'; Zirkzee 64'; Raman 82'	Stadium: Diaz Arena; Attendance: 5,008; Referee: Lothar D'hondt

2 October 2021 10	Sint-Truiden	1–1	Oostende	Sint-Truiden
18:30 CEST (UTC+2)		Report		Stadium: Stayen; Attendance: 2,500; Referee: Jan Boterberg

16 October 2021 11	Oostende	2–1	Cercle Brugge	Ostend
18:30 CEST (UTC+2)		Report		Stadium: Versluys Arena; Attendance: 4,132; Referee: Wim Smet

23 October 2021 12	Kortrijk	1–0	Oostende	Kortrijk
CEST (UTC+2)		Report		Stadium: Guldensporen Stadion; Attendance: 3,357; Referee: Jonathan Lardot

29 October 2021 13	Oostende	2–4	Mechelen	Ostend
21:00 CET (UTC+1)				Stadium: Diaz Arena

5 November 2021 14	OH Leuven	1–0	Oostende	Leuven
20:45 CET (UTC+1)		Report		Stadium: Den Dreef; Attendance: 5,540; Referee: Wesli De Cremer

21 November 2021 15	Oostende	1–7	Union Saint-Gilloise	Oostende
18:30 CET (UTC+1)	Ambrose 23'; Capon (yellow card) 54'	Report	Undav 5', 16', 59', 80'; Nielsen 30'; Burgess 45+3', 69'	Stadium: Diaz Arena; Referee: Kevin Van Damme

28 November 2021 16	Antwerp	3–0	Oostende	Antwerp
21:00 CET (UTC+1)	Fischer 48'; Dwomoh (yellow card) 53'; Frey 62'; Benson 80'	Report	Koziello (yellow card) 38'; Ndicka (yellow card) 84'	Stadium: Bosuilstadion; Attendance: 15,000; Referee: Christof Dierick

4 December 2021 17	Oostende	2–1	Eupen	Ostend
21:00 CET (UTC+1)				Stadium: Diaz Arena

10 December 2021 18	Charleroi	1–0	Oostende	Charleroi
20:45 CET (UTC+1)		Report		Stadium: Stade du Pays de Charleroi; Attendance: 4,315; Referee: Bert Put

14 December 2021 19	Oostende	0–2	Kortrijk	Ostend
CET (UTC+1)		Report		Stadium: Versluys Arena; Attendance: 1,756; Referee: Lothar D'hondt

18 December 2021 20	Beerschot	0–2	Oostende	Antwerp
21:00 CET (UTC+1)				Stadium: Olympic Stadium

26 December 2021 21	Oostende	0–4	Genk	Ostend
21:00 CET (UTC+1)		Report	Ugbo 6'; Ito 12'; Muñoz 53'; Hrošovský 78'; Thorstvedt (red card) 83'	Stadium: Versluys Arena; Attendance: 0 Referee: Jan Boterberg

21 January 2022 23	Oostende	1–2	Antwerp	Ostend
20:45 CET (UTC+1)	Medley 48'; Koziello (yellow card) 88'	Report	Nainggolan (yellow card) 23'; Frey 61'; Balikwisha 70'; B. Verstraete (yellow card) 90'	Stadium: Diaz Arena; Attendance: 0 Referee: Bert Put

25 January 2022 24	Gent	1–1	Oostende	Ghent
21:00 CEST (UTC+2)	Hjulsager 74'	Report	Ambrose 8'	Stadium: Ghelamco Arena; Referee: Brent Staessens

29 January 2022 25	Cercle Brugge	0–1	Oostende	Bruges
20:45 CET (UTC+1)		Report	D'Arpino 76'	Stadium: Jan Breydel Stadium; Attendance: 3,200; Referee: Arthur Denil

5 February 2022 26	Oostende	1–3	OH Leuven	Ostend
21:00 CET (UTC+1)	D'Arpino 56'	Report	Shengelia 34'; Kaba 48'; Al-Taamari 85'	Stadium: Diaz Arena; Attendance: 2,221; Referee: Wim Smet

9 February 2022 22	Zulte Waregem	0–0	Oostende	Waregem
21:00 CET (UTC+1)				Stadium: Regenboogstadion

12 February 2022 27	Mechelen	3–0	Oostende	Mechelen
18:30 CET (UTC+1)				Stadium: Achter de Kazerne; Referee: Nicolas Laforge

19 February 2022 28	Oostende	1–0	Standard Liège	Ostend
18:30 CET (UTC+1)	Santos 28'; Capon (yellow card) 62'	Report	Emond (yellow card) 26'; Cafaro (yellow card) 34'; Raskin (yellow card) 53'; Bokadi (yellow card) 81'; Nkounkou (yellow card) 86'	Stadium: Diaz Arena; Attendance: 3,267; Referee: Erik Lambrechts

26 February 2022 29	Oostende	0–0	Sint-Truiden	Ostend
16:15 CET (UTC+1)		Report		Stadium: Versluys Arena; Attendance: 3,360; Referee: Kevin Van Damme

6 March 2022 30	Anderlecht	3–0	Oostende	Anderlecht
16:00 CET (UTC+1)	Refaelov 50'; Verschaeren 78'; Raman 82'	Report		Stadium: Constant Vanden Stock Stadium; Attendance: 9,000; Referee: Wesli De Cremer

12 March 2022 31	Oostende	1–3	Club Brugge	Ostend
20:45 CET (UTC+1)	Jäkel 22'	Report	Adamyan 17', 32'; Skov Olsen 63'	Stadium: Diaz Arena; Attendance: 6,402; Referee: Alexandre Boucaut

18 March 2022 32	Union Saint-Gilloise	1–1	Oostende	Brussels
20:45 CET (UTC+1)	Undav 83'	Report	D'Arpino 9'	Stadium: Stade Joseph Marien; Attendance: 7,850; Referee: Lothar D'hondt

2 April 2022 33	Oostende	2–2	Seraing	Ostend
20:45 CEST (UTC+2)		Report		Stadium: Diaz Arena; Attendance: 4,086; Referee: Jan Boterberg

9 April 2022 34	Eupen	0–2	Oostende	Eupen
18:30 CEST (UTC+2)		Report		Stadium: Kehrwegstadion; Attendance: 2,000; Referee: Brent Staessens

=== Belgian Cup ===
26 October 2021 Sixth round	Oostende	8–1	Onhaye	Oostende
20:00 CEST (UTC+2)	Kvasina 5', 26', 41'; Fortès 37'; Atanga 50', 60'; Ambrose 75' (pen.); Ndicka 80'		Delplank 3'	Stadium: Diaz Arena

1 December 2021 Seventh round	Kortrijk	1–0	Oostende	Kortrijk
20:30 CET (UTC+1)	Guèye 53'			Stadium: Guldensporen Stadion
