= 2020–21 KV Oostende season =

K.V. Oostende
2020–21 season
- Chairman: Franck Dierckens
- Manager: Alexander Blessin
- Stadium: Versluys Arena
- Belgian First Division A: 5th
- Belgian Cup: Seventh round
- Top goalscorer: League: Fashion Sakala (13 goals); All: Fashion Sakala (16 goals)
Home colours	Away colours	Third colours
- All statistics correct as of 22 May 2021.

The 2020–21 K.V. Oostende season was the club's 117th season in existence and its eighth consecutive season in the top flight of Belgian football. In addition to the domestic league, Oostende participated in this season's edition of the Belgian Cup. The season covered the period from 1 July 2020 to 30 June 2021.

== Players ==
=== First-team squad ===
As of 24 August 2020

Note: Flags indicate national team as defined under FIFA eligibility rules; some limited exceptions apply. Players may hold more than one non-FIFA nationality.

No.	Pos.	Nation	Player
4	DF	SCO	Jack Hendry (on loan from Celtic)
5	DF	BEL	Arthur Theate
6	MF	FRA	Maxime D'Arpino
7	FW	SEN	Makhtar Gueye
8	MF	BEL	François Marquet
9	FW	ALB	Sindrit Guri
10	FW	ZAM	Fashion Sakala
11	MF	BEL	Indy Boonen
15	DF	GER	Frederik Jäkel (on loan from RB Leipzig)
17	MF	DEN	Andrew Hjulsager
18	MF	NIR	Cameron McGeehan
19	FW	SEN	Mamadou Thiam
20	DF	FRA	Théo Ndicka

No.	Pos.	Nation	Player
21	FW	AUT	Marko Kvasina
23	DF	ISL	Ari Freyr Skúlason
24	MF	BEL	Evangelos Patoulidis
25	MF	BEL	Jelle Bataille
26	MF	BEL	Kévin Vandendriessche
27	DF	BEL	Brecht Capon
28	GK	BEL	Guillaume Hubert
29	MF	BEL	Robbie D'Haese
33	DF	BEL	Anton Tanghe
34	MF	GER	Nick Bätzner
73	FW	BEL	Jorben Vanhulle
94	GK	BEL	Jordi Schelfhout
99	GK	BEL	Bram Castro

== Pre-season and friendlies ==
Win Draw Loss

4 July 2020 Friendly	Varsenare (Belgium)	0–7	(Belgium) Oostende	Varsenare, Belgium
15:00 CEST (UTC+2)				Stadium: Gemeentelijk Sportcomplex Van Caloen

18 July 2020 Friendly	Sint-Eloois-Winkel (Belgium)	Cancelled	(Belgium) Oostende	Sint-Eloois-Winkel, Belgium
18:00 CEST (UTC+2)				Stadium: Sportpark Terschueren

25 July 2020 Friendly	Oostende (Belgium)	1–2	(Belgium) Union Saint-Gilloise	Oudenburg, Belgium
16:00 CEST (UTC+2)				Stadium: Sportterrein Ter Beke

1 August 2020 Friendly	Oostende (Belgium)	3–1	(Belgium) Cercle Brugge	Ostend, Belgium
16:00 CEST (UTC+2)				Stadium: Versluys Arena

4 September 2020 Friendly	Oostende (Belgium)	Cancelled	(Belgium) Roeselare	Ostend, Belgium
11:00 CEST (UTC+2)				Stadium: Versluys Arena

5 September 2020 Friendly	Oostende (Belgium)	3–1	(Belgium) Knokke	Ostend, Belgium
11:00 CEST (UTC+2)				Stadium: Versluys Arena

13 November 2020 Friendly	Oostende (Belgium)	2–1	(France) Dunkerque	Ostend, Belgium
11:00 CET (UTC+1)				Stadium: Versluys Arena

26 March 2021 Friendly	Oostende (Belgium)	1–4	(Belgium) Gent	Ostend, Belgium
11:30 CET (UTC+1)	10' (o.g.)		Bezus 29' (pen.); Tanghe 31' (o.g.); Malede 72'; Tissoudali 76'	Stadium: Versluys Arena

24 April 2021 Friendly	Oostende (Belgium)	0–3	(Belgium) Anderlecht	Ostend, Belgium
12:00 CEST (UTC+2)				Stadium: Versluys Arena

== Competitions ==
=== Overview ===
Competition	First match	Last match	Starting round	Final position	Record							
Competition	First match	Last match	Starting round	Final position	Pld	W	D	L	GF	GA	GD	Win %
Belgian First Division A	10 August 2020	22 May 2021	Matchday 1	5th	40	17	9	14	64	57	+7	42.50
Belgian Cup	3 February 2021	9 February 2021	Sixth round	Seventh round	2	1	0	1	4	5	−1	50.00
Total					42	18	9	15	68	62	+6	42.86

Last updated: 22 May 2021
Source: Soccerway

=== Belgian First Division A ===
==== Regular season ====
Pos	Team	Pld	W	D	L	GF	GA	GD	Pts	Qualification or relegation
3	Anderlecht	34	15	13	6	51	34	+17	58	Qualification for the Play-offs I
4	Genk (Note: Genk qualifies for at least the play-off round of the Europa League through winning the 2021 Belgian Cup.)	34	16	8	10	67	48	+19	56	Qualification for the Play-offs I
5	Oostende (Note: On 14 April 2021 news was released that both Excel Mouscron and Oostende had not received a Belgian professional football license for the coming season, a requirement to play at the top two levels of Belgian football. For Oostende, a lack of financial transparency, together with generally poor quality and incompleteness of the submitted report, was given as the main reason by the committee for not awarding a license, while Excel Mouscron was refused a license as besides insufficient transparency, the committee also questioned several cash flows and whether the club was creditworthy in general, also due to the fact that the wages for the months of February and March had not yet been paid at that point. For Excel Mouscron, it was already the sixth year running the license was (initially) refused, however, the club has appealed the decision with the Belgian Court for Sports Arbitrage (BAS) successfully on each occasion and intended to do so again. Oostende was planning to launch an appeal as well, with the BAS to rule on the matter for both clubs before the 10th of May. Both clubs were allowed to add new documents to their case, but in case they however still did not receive a license after appeal, knew they would have been forced to relegate to the 2021–22 Belgian Division 2 and start the season with a 3-point penalty. Both Excel Mouscron and Oostende were however eventually awarded a license after appeal, meaning Oostende remained at the top level, while Excel Mouscron only dropped one level.)	34	15	8	11	49	41	+8	53	Qualification for the Play-offs II
6	Standard Liège	34	13	11	10	52	41	+11	50	Qualification for the Play-offs II
7	Gent	34	14	7	13	55	42	+13	49	Qualification for the Play-offs II

Source: Jupiler Pro League (in Dutch), Soccerway
Rules for classification: 1) Points; 2) Matches won; 3) Goal difference; 4) Goals scored; 5) Away matches won; 6) Away goal difference; 7) Away goals scored; 8) Play-off.

==== Results summary ====
Overall								Home						Away					
Pld	W	D	L	GF	GA	GD	Pts	W	D	L	GF	GA	GD	W	D	L	GF	GA	GD
34	15	8	11	49	41	+8	53	9	5	3	33	21	+12	6	3	8	16	20	−4

Last updated: 18 April 2021.
Source: Jupiler Pro League

==== Results by round ====
Round	1	2	3	4	5	6	7	8	9	10	11	12	13	14	15	16	17	18	19	20	21	22	23	24	25	26	27	28	29	30	31	32	33	34
Ground	H	A	A	H	A	H	A	H	A	H	A	H	H	A	H	A	H	H	A	H	H	A	A	H	A	H	H	A	H	A	A	H	A	H
Result	L	L	D	D	W	W	D	W	L	W	L	L	D	L	W	W	D	L	W	W	W	L	W	D	L	W	W	D	W	L	W	L	W	D
Position	14	17	17	17	12	8	9	8	10	10	10	10	11	11	10	10	10	10	8	8	7	8	7	6	8	5	4	4	4	4	4	5	5	5

Updated to match(es) played on 18 April 2021. Source: Jupiler Pro League
A = Away; H = Home; W = Win; D = Draw; L = Loss

==== Matches ====
The league fixtures were announced on 8 July 2020.

10 August 2020 1	Oostende	1–2	Beerschot	Ostend
19:00 CEST (UTC+2)	Tanghe (yellow card) 19'; Gueye (yellow card) 22'; Vandendriessche 63'; Kvasina (yellow card) 72'	Report	Noubissi 1', 74'; Prychynenko (yellow card) 60'; Van den Buijs (yellow card) 83'	Stadium: Versluys Arena; Attendance: 0 Referee: Bram Van Driessche

15 August 2020 2	Charleroi	1–0	Oostende	Charleroi
19:00 CEST (UTC+2)	Rezaei 76'; Morioka (yellow card) 80'	Report	Bataille (yellow card) 50'; Gueye (yellow card) 57'	Stadium: Stade du Pays de Charleroi; Attendance: 0 Referee: Wesli De Cremer

24 August 2020 3	Sint-Truiden	0–0	Oostende	Sint-Truiden
20:45 CEST (UTC+2)	Lee (yellow card) 22'; Teixeira (red card) 42'	Report	Hjulsager (yellow card) 18'; Skúlason (yellow card) 33'; D'Arpino (yellow card) 44'; Bataille (yellow card) 59' (yellow-red card) 76'; Gueye (yellow card) 77'; Tanghe (yellow card) 83'	Stadium: Stayen; Attendance: 0 Referee: Frederik Geldhof

28 August 2020 4	Oostende	2–2	Anderlecht	Ostend
20:45 CEST (UTC+2)	D'Haese 11'; D'Arpino (yellow card) 29'; Gueye 34' (pen.); Theate (yellow card) 56'; McGeehan (yellow card) 72'	Report	Kana (yellow card) 33'; Trebel 35', (yellow card) 57'; Murillo (yellow card) 43'; Tau 54'	Stadium: Versluys Arena; Attendance: 0 Referee: Jan Boterberg

12 September 2020 5	KV Mechelen	0–1	Oostende	Mechelen
16:15 CEST (UTC+2)	Van Damme (yellow card) 52'; Kaboré (yellow card) 61'; Bijker (yellow card) 75'; Hairemans (yellow card) 83'; Vanlerberghe (yellow card) 89'	Report	D'Arpino (yellow card) 82'; Vandendriessche (yellow card) 90'; Hendry 90+5'	Stadium: Achter de Kazerne; Attendance: 5,200; Referee: Lothar D'Hondt

19 September 2020 6	Oostende	3–1	OH Leuven	Ostend
16:15 CEST (UTC+2)	Theate (yellow card) 2'; Sakala 26', 50', (yellow card) 41'; Gueye (yellow card) 32', (goal) 60'; Bataille (yellow card) 46'	Report	Raemaekers (yellow card) 11'; Vlietinck (yellow card) 45+1'; Maertens 79'	Stadium: Versluys Arena; Attendance: 3,000; Referee: Christof Dierick

28 September 2020 7	Genk	2–2	Oostende	Genk
20:45 CEST (UTC+2)	Onuachu 9', 52' (pen.); Lucumí (yellow card) 48'; Toma (red card) 56'	Report	McGeehan 3', (yellow card) 40'; Gueye (yellow card) 45', (goal) 83'; Hjulsager (yellow card) 87'; Bataille (yellow card) 90+5'; Ndicka (yellow card) 90+7'	Stadium: Luminus Arena; Attendance: 2,340; Referee: Nicolas Laforge

4 October 2020 8	Oostende	3–0	Excel Mouscron	Ostend
20:45 CEST (UTC+2)	Theate 60'; Sakala 81'; McGeehan 90+3', (yellow card) 90+4'	Report		Stadium: Versluys Arena; Attendance: 2,112; Referee: Kevin Van Damme

25 October 2020 10	Oostende	3–0	Zulte Waregem	Ostend
16:00 CET (UTC+1)	Vandendriessche 32'; D'Arpino 33'; Sakala 37'	Report		Stadium: Versluys Arena; Attendance: 0 Referee: Bert Put

1 November 2020 11	Standard Liège	1–0	Oostende	Liège
18:15 CET (UTC+1)	Dussenne 86'	Report		Stadium: Stade Maurice Dufrasne; Attendance: 0 Referee: Lawrence Visser

8 November 2020 12	Oostende	1–3	Club Brugge	Ostend
16:00 CET (UTC+1)	Gueye 38'; Bataille (yellow card) 59' (yellow-red card) 76'; Ndicka (yellow card) 68'	Report	Rits 32'; Diatta 81'; Badji 90'	Stadium: Versluys Arena; Attendance: 0 Referee: Kevin Van Damme

21 November 2020 13	Oostende	1–1	Antwerp	Ostend
18:30 CET (UTC+1)	Tanghe 80'; Kvasina (yellow card) 89'	Report	Haroun (yellow card) 34'; Refaelov 81'	Stadium: Versluys Arena; Attendance: 0 Referee: Erik Lambrechts

24 November 2020 9	Waasland-Beveren	2–0	Oostende	Beveren
17:00 CET (UTC+1)	Albanese 46', (yellow card) 70'; Sinani 61'; Frey (yellow card) 78'	Report	Sakala (yellow card) 22'; Theate (yellow card) 79'	Stadium: Freethiel Stadion; Attendance: 0 Referee: Wim Smet

29 November 2020 14	Kortrijk	3–1	Oostende	Kortrijk
20:45 CET (UTC+1)	Dewaele 4'; Guèye 49'; Mboyo 80'	Report	McGeehan (yellow card) 17'; Hjulsager 32', (yellow card) 57'; Hendry (yellow card) 77'	Stadium: Guldensporen Stadion; Attendance: 0 Referee: Nathan Verboomen

6 December 2020 15	Oostende	2–1	Gent	Ostend
20:45 CET (UTC+1)	Skúlason (yellow card) 45+2'; Gueye (yellow card) 59', (goal) 61'; Sakala 73' (pen.)	Report	Bukari 5', (yellow card) 67'; Fortuna (yellow card) 89'; Ngadeu-Ngadjui (yellow card) 90+5'; Bezus (yellow card) 90+5'	Stadium: Versluys Arena; Attendance: 0 Referee: Lothar D'hondt

12 December 2020 16	Cercle Brugge	0–1	Oostende	Bruges
18:30 CET (UTC+1)	Omolo (yellow card) 39'; Bates (yellow card) 52'; Vanhoutte (yellow card) 62'	Report	Vandendriessche 29'	Stadium: Jan Breydel Stadium; Attendance: 0 Referee: Jasper Vergoote

15 December 2020 18	Anderlecht	2–1	Oostende	Anderlecht
21:00 CET (UTC+1)	Nmecha 18', 58' (pen.)	Report	McGeehan 83'	Stadium: Constant Vanden Stock Stadium; Attendance: 0 Referee: Kevin Van Damme

26 December 2020 19	OH Leuven	1–2	Oostende	Leuven
18:30 CET (UTC+1)	Malinov 35'; Ngawa (yellow card) 82'	Report	D'Arpino (yellow card) 29'; Skúlason (yellow card) 37'; Theate 59'; Ngawa 72' (o.g.); Bataille (yellow card) 79'	Stadium: Den Dreef; Attendance: 0 Referee: Bert Put

9 January 2021 30	Oostende	3–2	Charleroi	Ostend
20:45 CET (UTC+1)		Report		Stadium: Diaz Arena; Attendance: 0 Referee: Lothar D'hondt

12 January 2021 17	Oostende	1–1	Eupen	Ostend
20:45 CET (UTC+1)	Kvasina 79'	Report	Prevljak 49'	Stadium: Diaz Arena; Attendance: 0 Referee: Kevin Van Damme

16 January 2021 20	Oostende	2–1	Kortrijk	Ostend
16:15 CET (UTC+1)				Stadium: Diaz Arena; Attendance: 0

20 January 2021 21	Club Brugge	2–1	Oostende	Bruges
21:00 CET (UTC+1)	Lang (yellow card) 32'; Dost 38'; Diatta 49'	Report	Mata 14' (o.g.); Jäkel (yellow card) 40'; Sakala (penalty missed) 52'	Stadium: Jan Breydel Stadium; Attendance: 0 Referee: Wim Smet

23 January 2021 22	Antwerp	1–2	Oostende	Antwerp
20:45 CET (UTC+1)	Gerkens 15'; Lukaku (yellow card) 22'; Buta (yellow card) 34'; Hongla (yellow card) 51'	Report	Hendry (yellow card) 8'; Sakala 35'; Hjulsager (yellow card) 59'; Bätzner (yellow card) 62'; Kvasina 85'	Stadium: Bosuilstadion; Attendance: 0 Referee: Bert Put

28 January 2021 23	Oostende	2–2	Standard Liège	Ostend
21:00 CET (UTC+1)	Sakala 8', 64'; Hubert (yellow card) 88'; Hjulsager (yellow card) 89'	Report	Balikwisha 47'; Bokadi 90+4'	Stadium: Diaz Arena; Attendance: 0 Referee: Wesli De Cremer

31 January 2021 24	Zulte Waregem	2–1	Oostende	Waregem
16:00 CET (UTC+1)	Bruno 38'; Deschacht (yellow card) 44'; Vossen 65'	Report	Sakala 14'; Theate (yellow card) 69'	Stadium: Regenboogstadion; Attendance: 0 Referee: Jan Boterberg

6 February 2021 25	Oostende	3–1	Sint-Truiden	Ostend
16:15 CET (UTC+1)	Gueye 38', 60' (pen.); Sakala 74' (pen.)	Report	Lavalée (yellow card) 73'; Suzuki 90'	Stadium: Diaz Arena; Attendance: 0 Referee: Lothar D'hondt

17 February 2021 26	Oostende	3–1	Genk	Ostend
19:00 CET (UTC+1)	Hubert (yellow card) 9'; Gueye 22' (pen.), 26' (pen.); Theate 58'	Report	Onuachu 10' (pen.); Cuesta (yellow card) 26'; McKenzie (yellow card) 90+1'	Stadium: Diaz Arena; Attendance: 0 Referee: Wim Smet

20 February 2021 27	Eupen	1–1	Oostende	Eupen
16:15 CET (UTC+1)	Cools (yellow card) 47'; Kayembe (yellow card) 67'; Baby 84'; Peeters (yellow card) 88'	Report	Hjulsager 49'; Tanghe (yellow card) 63'; Bataille (yellow card) 90+1'	Stadium: Kehrwegstadion; Attendance: 0 Referee: Jasper Vergoote

27 February 2021 28	Oostende	2–0	KV Mechelen	Ostend
18:30 CET (UTC+1)	D'Arpino (yellow card) 15'; Gueye 27' (pen.); Tanghe (yellow card) 28'; Capon 86'	Report	Hairemans (yellow card) 17'; Bateau (yellow card) 26'; Vanlerberghe (yellow card) 88'	Stadium: Diaz Arena; Attendance: 0 Referee: Bert Put

8 March 2021 29	Gent	1–0	Oostende	Ghent
20:45 CET (UTC+1)	Yaremchuk 41'; Bezus (yellow card) 52'	Report		Stadium: Ghelamco Arena; Attendance: 0 Referee: Wim Smet

20 March 2021 31	Excel Mouscron	0–1	Oostende	Mouscron
18:30 CET (UTC+1)	Hočko (yellow card) 45+3'	Report	D'Arpino (yellow card) 57'; Gueye 90+2'	Stadium: Stade Le Canonnier; Attendance: 0 Referee: Bert Put

3 April 2021 32	Oostende	0–2	Waasland-Beveren	Ostend
16:15 CEST (UTC+2)	Jäkel (yellow card) 45+3' (yellow-red card) 76'; Gueye (red card) 89'	Report	Sinani 23'; Vukotić (yellow card) 28'; Frey 41'; Bertone (yellow card) 74'	Stadium: Diaz Arena; Attendance: 0 Referee: Wesli De Cremer

11 April 2021 33	Beerschot	1–2	Oostende	Antwerp
20:45 CEST (UTC+2)	Brogno 23', (yellow card) 63'	Report	Kvasina 81'; Bataille 84', (yellow card) 88'; Thiam (yellow card) 90+2'	Stadium: Olympisch Stadion; Attendance: 0 Referee: Nicolas Laforge

18 April 2021 34	Oostende	1–1	Cercle Brugge	Ostend
18:00 CEST (UTC+2)	Hendry (yellow card) 79'; Kvasina 90+2'; Ndicka (yellow card) 90+5'	Report	Ugbo 49'; Corryn (yellow card) 64'; Biancone (yellow card) 79'	Stadium: Diaz Arena; Attendance: 0 Referee: Alexandre Boucaut

==== Play-Off II ====
Pos	Team	Pld	W	D	L	GF	GA	GD	Pts	Qualification or relegation	GNT	MEC	OOS	STA
1	Gent	6	4	1	1	13	6	+7	38	Qualification for the Europa Conference League second qualifying round	—	2–2	2–1	2–0
2	Mechelen	6	3	2	1	15	11	+4	35		1–2	—	5–3	3–1
3	Oostende	6	2	1	3	15	16	−1	34		0–4	2–2	—	6–2
4	Standard Liège	6	1	0	5	7	17	−10	28		2–1	1–2	1–3	—

Source: Jupiler Pro League (in Dutch), Soccerway
Legend: Blue = home team win; Yellow = draw; Red = away team win.
Rules for classification: 1) Points; 2) Points without (possible) half points added due to rounding; 3) Regular season finishing position.

==== Results summary ====
Overall								Home						Away					
Pld	W	D	L	GF	GA	GD	Pts	W	D	L	GF	GA	GD	W	D	L	GF	GA	GD
6	2	1	3	15	16	−1	7	1	1	1	8	8	0	1	0	2	7	8	−1

Last updated: 22 May 2021.
Source: Jupiler Pro League

==== Results by round ====
Round	1	2	3	4	5	6
Ground	H	A	A	H	H	A
Result	W	L	L	L	D	W
Position	1	1	2	3	3	3

Updated to match(es) played on 22 May 2021. Source: Jupiler Pro League
A = Away; H = Home; W = Win; D = Draw; L = Loss

==== Matches ====
1 May 2021 1	Oostende	6–2	Standard Liège	Ostend
20:45 CEST (UTC+2)	Kvasina 30'; Bätzner 39'; Theate 44', (yellow card) 62'; Capon (yellow card) 62'; Hjulsager 64'; Ndicka 90+3'; Boonen 90+6'	Report	Carcela (yellow card) 27' (yellow-red card) 50', (goal) 45+2'; Muleka 45'; Balikwisha (yellow card) 78'; Delferrière (yellow card) 89'	Stadium: Diaz Arena; Attendance: 0 Referee: Lothar D'hondt

9 May 2021 2	KV Mechelen	5–3	Oostende	Mechelen
16:00 CEST (UTC+2)	Vranckx (yellow card) 16'; Storm 34', 66', (yellow card) 63'; Mrabti 38'; Vanlerberghe 84'; De Camargo 90+2'	Report	Sakala 14'; Bataille (yellow card) 17'; Theate 30', (yellow card) 55'; Hjulsager 81'	Stadium: Achter de Kazerne; Attendance: 0 Referee: Bram Van Driessche

13 May 2021 3	Gent	2–1	Oostende	Ghent
13:30 CEST (UTC+2)	Yaremchuk 14', (yellow card) 90+2'; Ngadeu-Ngadjui (yellow card) 25'; Godeau 59'	Report	D'Haese (yellow card) 43'; Hjulsager 62'; D'Arpino (yellow card) 73'; Gueye (yellow card) 81'	Stadium: Ghelamco Arena; Attendance: 0 Referee: Nicolas Laforge

16 May 2021 4	Oostende	0–4	Gent	Ostend
13:30 CEST (UTC+2)	Hubert (red card) 34'	Report	Bezus 20', 66'; Castro-Montes 43'; Vandendriessche 58' (o.g.); Hanche-Olsen (yellow card) 89'	Stadium: Diaz Arena; Attendance: 0 Referee: Erik Lambrechts

19 May 2021 5	Oostende	2–2	KV Mechelen	Ostend
18:30 CEST (UTC+2)	Sakala 5', 20'; Jäkel (yellow card) 42'; Hubert (yellow card) 51'; Vandendriessche (yellow card) 69'	Report	Vranckx (yellow card) 40' (yellow-red card) 81'; Druijf 47'; Bateau 63'	Stadium: Diaz Arena; Attendance: 0 Referee: Nathan Verboomen

22 May 2021 6	Standard Liège	1–3	Oostende	Liège
20:00 CEST (UTC+2)	Balikwisha 13'; Klauss (yellow card) 63'; Laifis (yellow card) 90+1'	Report	Vandendriessche 6', 61'; Boonen 50'; Thiam (yellow card) 90'; Ndicka (yellow card) 90+3'	Stadium: Stade Maurice Dufrasne; Attendance: 0 Referee: Wim Smet

=== Belgian Cup ===
3 February 2021 Sixth round	Waasland-Beveren	2–3	Oostende	Beveren
20:00 CET (UTC+1)	Frey 24'; Faucher 54'	Report	McGeehan (yellow card) 30'; Gueye 40', 72', (yellow card) 69'; Hjulsager 76', (yellow card) 88'	Stadium: Freethiel Stadion; Attendance: 0

9 February 2021 Seventh round	Cercle Brugge	3–1	Oostende	Bruges
18:00 CET (UTC+1)	Deman 32', (yellow card) 34'; Denkey (yellow card) 61', (goal) 64'; Van der Bruggen (yellow card) 83'; Ugbo 90'	Report	Bätzner 29'; Thiam (yellow card) 90+1'	Stadium: Jan Breydel Stadium; Attendance: 0 Referee: Bert Put

== Statistics ==
=== Goalscorers ===
As of 8 March 2021

Rank	No.	Pos	Nat	Name	Pro League	Belgian Cup	Total
1	7	FW	(Senegal)	Makhtar Gueye	11	2	13
1	10	FW	(Zambia)	Fashion Sakala	13	0	13
3	17	MF	(Denmark)	Andrew Hjulsager	3	1	4
4	5	DF	(Belgium)	Arthur Theate	3	0	3
4	18	MF	(Northern Ireland)	Cameron McGeehan	3	0	3
4	26	MF	(Belgium)	Kévin Vandendriessche	3	0	3
7	4	DF	(Scotland)	Jack Hendry	2	0	2
7	21	FW	(Austria)	Marko Kvasina	2	0	2
9	6	MF	(France)	Maxime D'Arpino	1	0	1
9	27	MF	(Belgium)	Brecht Capon	1	0	1
9	29	MF	(Belgium)	Robbie D'Haese	1	0	1
9	33	DF	(Belgium)	Anton Tanghe	1	0	1
9	34	MF	(Germany)	Nick Bätzner	0	1	1
Own goals					1	0	1
Totals					45	4	49
