= Theate =

Theate may refer to:

- Arthur Theate (born 2000), Belgian footballer
- Chieti, city in the province of Chieti, Italy
- Misspelling of theatre
