= Ndicka =

Ndicka is a surname. Notable people with the surname include:

- Evan Ndicka (born 1999), French footballer
- Théo Ndicka (born 2000), French footballer
