= Cameron McGeehan =

English footballer (born 1995)

Personal information
- Full name: Cameron Alexander McGeehan
- Date of birth: 6 April 1995 (age 31)
- Place of birth: Kingston upon Thames, England
- Height: 6 ft 1 in (1.85 m)
- Position: Midfielder

Team information
- Current team: Barnsley
- Number: 8

Youth career
- 2003–2005: Fulham
- 2005–2011: Chelsea
- 2011–2013: Norwich City

Senior career*
Years	Team	Apps	(Gls)
2013–2015	Norwich City	0	(0)
2014	→ Luton Town (loan)	18	(3)
2015	→ Cambridge United (loan)	4	(3)
2015	→ Luton Town (loan)	15	(3)
2015–2017	Luton Town	65	(22)
2017–2020	Barnsley	61	(9)
2018	→ Scunthorpe United (loan)	13	(0)
2020	→ Portsmouth (loan)	12	(0)
2020–2023	Oostende	54	(7)
2023–2024	Colchester United	37	(9)
2024–2026	Northampton Town	73	(17)
2026–	Barnsley	11	(3)

International career^{‡}
2011	Northern Ireland U17	4	(0)
2013	Northern Ireland U19	3	(0)
2013–2014	Northern Ireland U21	3	(0)
2023	Northern Ireland	1	(0)
- * Club domestic league appearances and goals as of 16:25, 24 October 2026 (UTC) ‡ National team caps and goals as of 11:20, 12 April 2024 (UTC)

Cameron Alexander McGeehan (born 6 April 1995) is a professional footballer who plays as a midfielder for EFL League One club Barnsley. Born in England, he plays for the Northern Ireland national team.

McGeehan began his youth career at Fulham before joining Chelsea and later Norwich City. He captained Norwich to victory in the 2012–13 FA Youth Cup, scoring in both legs of the final against his former club Chelsea. While at Norwich, McGeehan had two loan spells both at Luton Town, helping the team win promotion to League Two, and a short loan spell with Cambridge United. McGeehan made his move to Luton permanent in 2015, staying for two seasons before joining Championship club Barnsley for an undisclosed fee in the summer of 2017. He joined Belgian side Oostende in August 2020.

== Early life and family ==
McGeehan was born in Kingston upon Thames, Greater London, to Kevin McGeehan and Julie Allen. He is the third of four children, with two older sisters, Lilli and Gracie and a younger brother, Freddie, who plays tennis at the University of Utah. He attended Tiffin School where he played both rugby and cricket. In October 2021, McGeehan announced his engagement to Made in Chelsea star Tiff Watson.

== Youth career ==
Having been signed from Fulham for £80,000 aged 10, McGeehan played for Chelsea from 2005 to 2011 before being released. He then signed for Norwich City in 2011 and was the captain of the 2012–13 FA Youth Cup winning team, scoring in both legs of the final against Chelsea.

== Senior career ==
=== Norwich City and loans ===
After time in the Norwich City youth teams, McGeehan signed a one-month youth loan with Conference Premier club Luton Town on 16 January 2014. He made his debut nine days later in a 3–0 win over Nuneaton Town. After impressing the fans and manager John Still, his loan was extended until the end of the season. McGeehan scored his first goal for Luton in a 1–0 win at home to Aldershot Town on 5 April, and this was followed up with a goal in the following match, a 2–0 win at home to Tamworth. He completed the loan spell with three goals from 18 appearances, as Luton won the Conference Premier title and promotion back to the Football League. McGeehan's performances in Luton's title run-in helped him win the Conference Premier Player of the Month award for April 2014.

McGeehan's first involvement with the Norwich first-team came on 26 August 2014 when he was named as an unused substitute in a 3–1 win at home to Crawley Town in the League Cup second round. He signed a two-year professional contract with the club in October 2014.

On 13 January 2015, McGeehan joined League Two club Cambridge United on a one-month youth loan. He made his debut four days later in a 4–0 win at home to Newport County, in which he scored twice and was named man of the match. Six days after his Football League debut, McGeehan made his first appearance in the FA Cup, playing in Cambridge's fourth round fixture with footballing giants Manchester United at the Abbey Stadium. He played for 90 minutes as Cambridge pulled off a shock result, holding the team 76 places above them in the football pyramid to a 0–0 draw. McGeehan's strong start to his Cambridge career continued, and he once again found himself on the scoresheet in a 1–1 draw with Dagenham & Redbridge. McGeehan received the first red card of his professional career in a 1–0 defeat at home to Wycombe Wanderers in what was to be the final match of his loan spell.

On 14 February 2015, McGeehan rejoined Luton Town on loan until the end of 2014–15, with a view to a permanent transfer. He said that playing for Norwich's under-21 team was "pretty poor in terms of competitive football" and that he had "wanted to come back [to Luton] from the moment I left". McGeehan scored his first goal since returning to Luton in a 3–2 defeat at home to Morecambe. He scored a late winner on his 20th birthday in a 1–0 win away to Tranmere Rovers, to end a run of seven consecutive losses for Luton that had seen them drop out of the play-off places.

=== Luton Town ===
On 1 July 2015, McGeehan joined Luton Town permanently on a two-year contract for an undisclosed six-figure fee, with a sell-on clause included. His first appearance after signing permanently came in a 3–1 win at home to newly promoted Championship club Bristol City in the League Cup first round on 11 August, before scoring Luton's second goal in the following match, a 2–2 draw with Oxford United four days later. McGeehan was introduced as a 60th-minute substitute in Luton's League Cup second round tie against Premier League team Stoke City, before scoring a last-minute equaliser to take the match to extra time. Luton eventually lost 8–7 on penalties, despite McGeehan netting in the penalty shoot-out. Following a suspension by the Irish Football Association for rejecting a Northern Ireland under-21 call-up, McGeehan came on as a 55th-minute substitute for Luke Guttridge and scored Luton's first goal in a 3–2 defeat away to Notts County. After he was dropped to the bench for the last couple of matches before John Still was sacked, McGeehan returned to the starting lineup in a 3–2 win away to Exeter City on 19 December and scored a 30th-minute penalty to increase his total to nine goals for the season. McGeehan was named the Football League Young Player of the Month for February 2016, during which he scored three goals in five appearances, as well as being named joint winner of the Luton Town Young Player of the Season award, shared with Jack Marriott, chosen by the Luton Town management team. McGeehan finished the season with 45 appearances and 14 goals.

McGeehan made his first appearance of 2016–17 in the starting lineup away to Plymouth Argyle on the opening day of the season, which finished as a 3–0 victory. His first goal of the season came in the following match, a 3–1 win at home to newly relegated Championship club Aston Villa in the EFL Cup first round. McGeehan scored two penalties against Newport County on 16 August, the second of which came in the sixth minute of stoppage time to give Luton a 2–1 home victory. He was nominated as PFA Fans' League Two Player of the Month for October, during which he scored two goals, which was eventually awarded to Ben Purrington of Plymouth Argyle. McGeehan suffered a broken leg during a 1–0 defeat away to Portsmouth on 2 January 2017 that ruled him out for the rest of the season, which he finished with 28 appearances and 11 goals.

=== Barnsley ===
On 23 June 2017, McGeehan signed for Championship club Barnsley on a three-year contract for an undisclosed fee. He made his debut on 12 September as an 88th-minute substitute in a 3–2 victory at home to Derby County in the EFL Cup second round. McGeehan scored his first goal for Barnsley in a 2–2 draw at home to Middlesbrough on 14 October.

He joined League One club Scunthorpe United on loan until the end of the season on 4 January 2018, having made 10 appearances and scored one goal for Barnsley up to that point in 2017–18. McGeehan made his debut as a 78th-minute substitute in a 3–1 home defeat to Gillingham on 20 January. He scored his first goal for Scunthorpe with a late equaliser in the 88th minute of the play-off semi-final first leg 2–2 home draw with Rotherham United, having entered the match as a 75th-minute substitute. McGeehan came on as a 62nd-minute substitute in the 2–0 away defeat in the second leg, meaning Scunthorpe lost the tie 4–2 on aggregate. He finished the loan with 15 appearances and one goal.

McGeehan was loaned to another League One club, Portsmouth, on 7 January 2020 until the end of the 2019–20 season. His first goal for Portsmouth was the winning goal in a 2–1 victory over former club Scunthorpe United in the quarter-final of the EFL Trophy two weeks later.

=== Oostende ===
In August 2020, McGeehan signed for Belgian First Division A club Oostende on a three-year contract.

=== Northampton Town ===
On 5 July 2024, McGeehan joined League One club Northampton Town on a two-year deal.

== International career ==
Born and raised in England, McGeehan also qualifies to play for Northern Ireland through his grandmother. He has represented the nation at under-17, under-19 and under-21 levels.

On 3 September 2015, McGeehan rejected a call-up from the Northern Ireland under-21s to face Scotland and Iceland as he was reconsidering his international future. As a result, he was suspended by the Irish Football Association for the duration of the international break, making him unavailable for selection in Luton's match against Cambridge United on 5 September. Then-Luton manager John Still said of McGeehan's suspension: "[he] was chosen for Northern Ireland U21s but has decided that he doesn't want to represent Northern Ireland, even though he has done before. He's had a chat with his family, because I think the Irish comes from a grandmother, and as a very confident young man, he feels that England is his country and he doesn't want to not think he can't make that step."

McGeehan was called up to the Northern Ireland national team for the first time on 16 May 2018. However, he withdrew from the squad six days later due to an ankle injury. On 23 March 2023, McGeehan won his first international cap, coming on as a substitute for Dan Ballard after 67 minutes, as Northern Ireland won 2-0 away at San Marino in a 2024 European Championship qualifying match.

== Career statistics ==
As of match played 24 October 2026

Appearances and goals by club, season and competition
Club	Season	League			National Cup		League Cup		Other		Total	
Club	Season	Division	Apps	Goals	Apps	Goals	Apps	Goals	Apps	Goals	Apps	Goals
Norwich City	2013–14	Premier League	0	0	0	0	0	0	—		0	0
Norwich City	2014–15	Championship	0	0	0	0	0	0	0	0	0	0
Norwich City	Total		0	0	0	0	0	0	0	0	0	0
Luton Town (loan)	2013–14	Conference Premier	18	3	—		—		—		18	3
Cambridge United (loan)	2014–15	League Two	4	3	2	0	—		—		6	3
Luton Town (loan)	2014–15	League Two	15	3	—		—		—		15	3
Luton Town	2015–16	League Two	41	12	1	0	2	1	1 (Note: Appearance in Football League Trophy)	1	45	14
Luton Town	2016–17	League Two	24	10	2	0	2	1	0	0	28	11
Luton Town	Total		80	25	3	0	4	2	1	1	88	28
Barnsley	2017–18	Championship	9	1	0	0	1	0	—		10	1
Barnsley	2018–19	League One	39	6	3	0	1	0	1 (Note: Appearance in EFL Trophy)	0	44	6
Barnsley	2019–20	Championship	13	2	0	0	1	0	—		14	2
Barnsley	Total		61	9	3	0	3	0	1	0	68	9
Scunthorpe United (loan)	2017–18	League One	13	0	—		—		2 (Note: Appearances in League One play-offs)	1	15	1
Portsmouth (loan)	2019–20	League One	12	0	1	0	—		4 (Note: Two appearances and two goals in EFL Trophy, two appearances in League One play-offs)	2	17	2
KV Oostende	2020–21	Belgian First Division A	20	3	1	0	—		—		21	3
KV Oostende	2021–22	Belgian First Division A	13	0	0	0	—		—		13	0
KV Oostende	2022–23	Belgian First Division A	21	4	1	0	—		—		22	4
KV Oostende	Total		54	7	2	0	0	0	0	0	56	7
Colchester United	2023–24	League Two	37	9	1	1	0	0	1	0	39	10
Northampton Town	2024–25	League One	40	10	1	0	1	0	1 (Note: Appearance in EFL Trophy)	0	43	10
Northampton Town	2025–26	League One	33	7	1	1	1	0	4 (Note: Appearances in EFL Trophy)	0	39	8
Northampton Town	Total		73	17	2	1	2	0	5	0	82	18
Barnsley	2026–27	League One	11	3	0	0	3	2	0	0	14	5
Career total			363	76	14	2	12	4	14	4	403	86

== Honours ==
Norwich City

- FA Youth Cup: 2012–13

Luton Town

- Conference Premier: 2013–14

Barnsley

- EFL League One runner-up: 2018–19

Individual

- Conference Premier Player of the Month: April 2014
- Football League Young Player of the Month: February 2016
- Luton Town Young Player of the Season: 2015–16
