= Siebe Wylin =

Belgian footballer

Personal information
- Date of birth: 27 May 2003 (age 23)
- Place of birth: Roeselare, Belgium
- Height: 1.80 m (5 ft 11 in)
- Position: Defender

Team information
- Current team: Fortuna Sittard
- Number: 2

Youth career
- –2019: Club Brugge
- 2019–2021: KV Oostende

Senior career*
Years	Team	Apps	(Gls)
2021–2024	KV Oostende	37	(1)
2024–2026	Club NXT	49	(4)
2026–	Fortuna Sittard	0	(0)

International career^{‡}
2022	Belgium U20	2	(0)
- * Club domestic league appearances and goals as of 20 April 2026 ‡ National team caps and goals as of 22 November 2022

Siebe Wylin (born 27 May 2003) is a Belgian footballer who plays as a defender for Eredivisie club Fortuna Sittard.

== Career ==
Wylin was born in and grew up in Roeselare. He played youth football for Club Brugge from under-8 up to under-16 level before he joined the under-18 team of KV Oostende in 2019. He made his senior debut on 2 October 2021 as a substitute in a 1–1 draw with Sint Truiden.

On 10 July 2026, Wylin moved to Dutch club Fortuna Sittard on a two-season deal.
