= Jack Hendry (footballer, born 1995) =

Scottish footballer

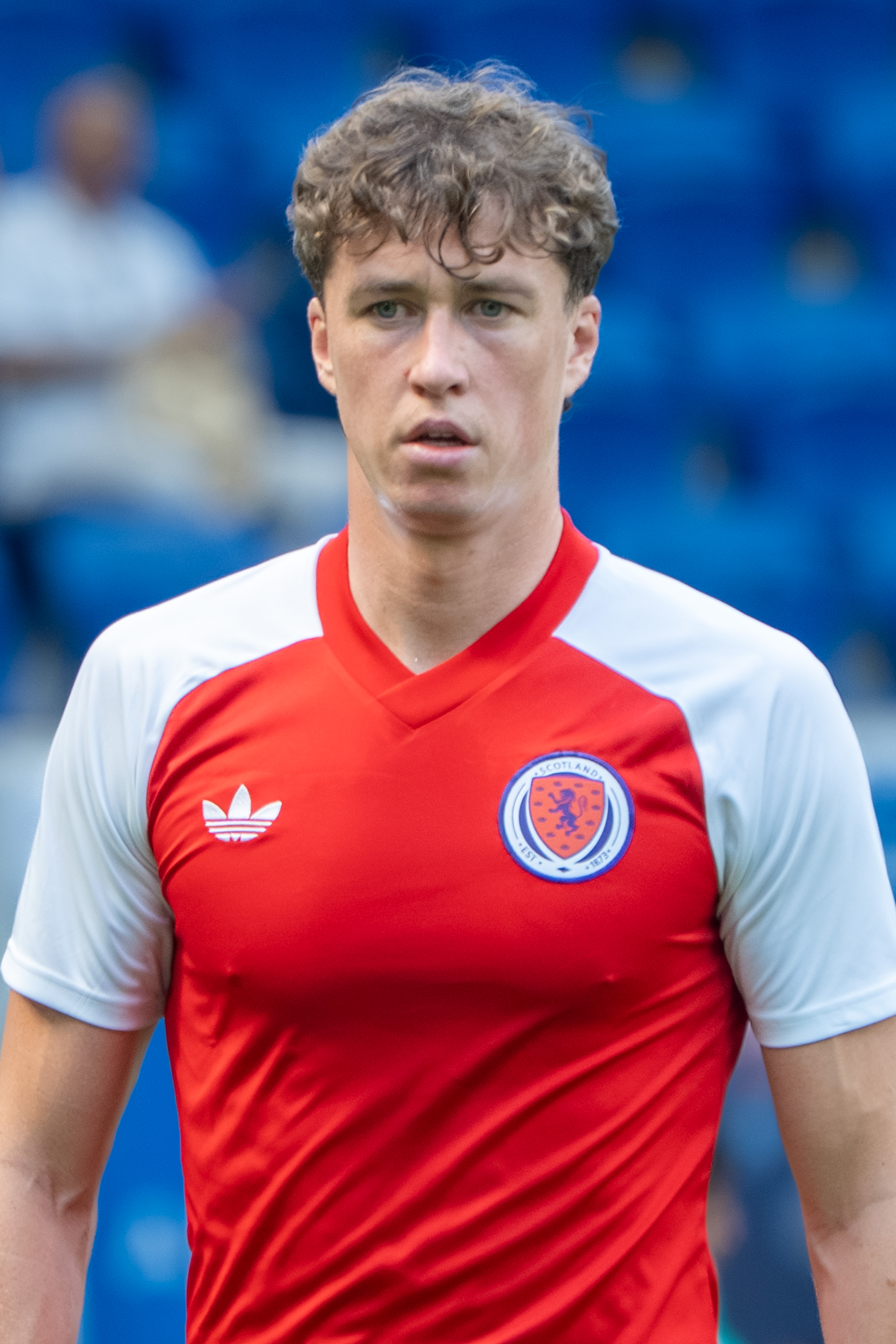
- Hendry with Scotland in 2026

Personal information
- Full name: Jack William Hendry
- Date of birth: 7 May 1995 (age 31)
- Place of birth: Glasgow, Scotland
- Height: 6 ft 5 in (1.95 m)
- Position: Centre-back

Team information
- Current team: Al-Ettifaq
- Number: 4

Youth career
- 2004–2011: Celtic
- 2011–2013: Peterborough United
- 2013–2014: Dundee United
- 2014–2015: Partick Thistle

Senior career*
| Years | Team | Apps | (Gls) |
| 2015 | Partick Thistle | 4 | (0) |
| 2015–2017 | Wigan Athletic | 0 | (0) |
| 2016 | → Shrewsbury Town (loan) | 6 | (0) |
| 2016 | → Milton Keynes Dons (loan) | 7 | (0) |
| 2017–2018 | Dundee | 24 | (1) |
| 2018–2021 | Celtic | 15 | (0) |
| 2020 | → Melbourne City (loan) | 2 | (0) |
| 2020–2021 | → KV Oostende (loan) | 30 | (2) |
| 2021 | KV Oostende | 6 | (0) |
| 2021–2023 | Club Brugge | 31 | (1) |
| 2022–2023 | → Cremonese (loan) | 4 | (0) |
| 2023– | Al-Ettifaq | 90 | (2) |

International career^{‡}
| 2018– | Scotland | 43 | (3) |
- * Club domestic league appearances and goals as of 11:05, 12 November 2026 (UTC) ‡ National team caps and goals as of 29 September 2026

Jack William Hendry (born 7 May 1995) is a Scottish professional footballer who plays as a centre-back for Saudi Pro League club Al-Ettifaq and the Scotland national team.

He has previously played for Partick Thistle, Wigan Athletic, Dundee, Celtic and KV Oostende. He has also had loan spells at Shrewsbury Town, Milton Keynes Dons, A-League club Melbourne City and Serie A club Cremonese.

== Early life ==
Hendry was born in Glasgow. He had spells as a youth player with Celtic and Peterborough United. He joined Dundee United on trial in 2013 and subsequently signed a contract with them, but his time there was severely disrupted by a bout of glandular fever.

== Club career ==
=== Partick Thistle ===
Hendry joined Partick Thistle in August 2014. He featured in Thistle's development squad frequently, before making his first-team debut for the side on the final day of the 2014–15 season in a goalless draw against Motherwell at Fir Park on 23 May 2015.

On 2 June 2015, Hendry signed a new one-year contract with the Jags, alongside David Wilson and goalkeepers Paul Gallacher and Tomáš Černý. After an outstanding pre season, Hendry came on as a substitute in the opening game of the season away to Hamilton after only 29 minutes following an earlier red card for Frédéric Frans, he went on to help keep a clean sheet alongside Liam Lindsay in defence as the match finished 0–0. Following the match it was reported that English Premier League club Everton had been watching Hendry.

=== Wigan Athletic ===
On 1 September 2015, Hendry signed for Wigan Athletic. He joined fellow League One side Shrewsbury Town on loan until the end of the season in March 2016.

On 31 August 2016, Hendry joined League One side Milton Keynes Dons on loan until January 2017. On 4 October 2016, Hendry made his debut for Milton Keynes Dons, featuring in a 0–1 away EFL Trophy group stage win over Peterborough United.

=== Dundee ===
Hendry signed a two-year contract with Dundee in July 2017. He played regularly and became a key player for Dundee in the first part of the 2017–18 season. Dundee rejected offers from Celtic for Hendry during January 2018, before agreeing a club-record fee on 31 January.

=== Celtic ===
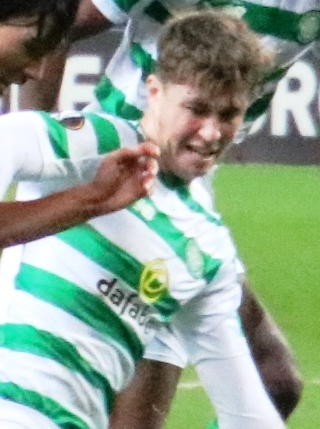
Hendry playing for Celtic in 2018.

Celtic signed Hendry to a four-and-a-half-year contract on 31 January 2018. He made his debut for the club in a 1–0 defeat away to Kilmarnock on 3 February.

==== Melbourne City ====
On 22 January 2020, Hendry joined A-League club Melbourne City on loan for the rest of the season. During his second appearance for Melbourne, Hendry suffered a knee ligament injury that required surgery.

=== Oostende ===
Hendry was loaned to Belgian club KV Oostende in July 2020, and Celtic gave the Belgian club first option to buy him. In his Belgian Pro League debut in September 2020 he scored a last-minute winner against KV Mechelen to clinch a 1–0 victory for his new club. At the end of the regular season, Hendry was named as the highest-rated player in the division by Sport/Voetbalmagazine. Hendry moved to Oostende on a permanent basis in June 2021.

=== Club Brugge ===
On 31 August 2021, just two-months after signing permanently for KV Oostende, Hendry joined Club Brugge on a four-year contract. He featured in Brugge's famous 1–1 Champions League draw against a star-studded PSG side (featuring Messi, Mbappé and Neymar playing together for the first time), and was named as Player of the Match by the BBC. Hendry would score his first goal for the side in a win over Royal Antwerp in a game which clinched Club Brugge the Jupiler Pro League title.

==== Loan to Cremonese ====
On 1 September 2022, Hendry joined Cremonese in Italy on loan, with an option to buy. Hendry made his debut for Cremonese in a Serie A game against Atalanta. On 26 January 2023, Hendry would return to his parent club.

=== Al-Ettifaq ===
On 26 July 2023, Hendry signed for Saudi club Al-Ettifaq until 2026, along with his former teammate at Celtic, Moussa Dembélé. He scored his first goal for the club in a 3–2 win over Al Qadsiah on 5 April 2026. Later that year, on 4 July, he signed a new two-year contract with the club.

== International career ==
In March 2018, Hendry received his first call-up to the senior Scotland squad for the friendlies with Costa Rica and Hungary. He made his Scotland debut on 27 March, playing in a 1–0 win against Hungary. Hendry was recalled to the squad in March 2021, after performing well in the Belgian league for KV Oostende. He was then selected in the Scotland squad for the delayed UEFA Euro 2020 finals, and scored his first international goal in a pre-tournament friendly against the Netherlands.

Hendry scored a crucial equaliser against the Republic of Ireland in the UEFA Nations League on 23 September 2022. Scotland went on to win the game 2–1, with Ryan Christie scoring the other Scotland goal.

On 7 June 2024, Hendry was named in Scotland's squad for the UEFA Euro 2024 finals in Germany. A week later, he started the opening match of the tournament, where Scotland lost 5–1 to hosts Germany. He went on to start against both Switzerland and Hungary as Scotland finished bottom of Group A with one point from three matches.

On 19 May 2026, Hendry was selected in the 26-man squad for the 2026 FIFA World Cup.

Hendry was sent off for the first time when he committed a professional foul against Switzerland in the UEFA Nations League on 29 September 2026.

== Career statistics ==
=== Club ===
As of match played 4 September 2026

Appearances and goals by club, season and competition
| Club | Season | League | | | National cup (Note: Includes Scottish Cup, FA Cup, Belgian Cup, Coppa Italia, King's Cup) | | League cup (Note: Includes Scottish League Cup) | | Continental | | Other | | Total | |
| Club | Season | Division | Apps | Goals | Apps | Goals | Apps | Goals | Apps | Goals | Apps | Goals | Apps | Goals |
|---|---|---|---|---|---|---|---|---|---|---|---|---|---|---|
| Partick Thistle | 2014–15 | Scottish Premiership | 1 | 0 | 0 | 0 | 0 | 0 | — | | — | | 1 | 0 |
| Partick Thistle | 2015–16 | Scottish Premiership | 3 | 0 | 0 | 0 | 1 | 0 | — | | — | | 4 | 0 |
| Partick Thistle | Total | | 4 | 0 | 0 | 0 | 1 | 0 | — | | — | | 5 | 0 |
| Wigan Athletic | 2015–16 | League One | 0 | 0 | 0 | 0 | 0 | 0 | — | | 3 (Note: Appearances in EFL Trophy) | 0 | 3 | 0 |
| Wigan Athletic | 2016–17 | Championship | 0 | 0 | 0 | 0 | 0 | 0 | — | | — | | 0 | 0 |
| Wigan Athletic | Total | | 0 | 0 | 0 | 0 | 0 | 0 | — | | 3 | 0 | 3 | 0 |
| Shrewsbury Town (loan) | 2015–16 | League One | 6 | 0 | 0 | 0 | 0 | 0 | — | | 0 | 0 | 6 | 0 |
| Milton Keynes Dons (loan) | 2016–17 | League One | 7 | 0 | 2 | 0 | 0 | 0 | — | | 3 | 0 | 12 | 0 |
| Dundee | 2017–18 | Scottish Premiership | 24 | 1 | 1 | 0 | 5 | 1 | — | | — | | 30 | 2 |
| Celtic | 2017–18 | Scottish Premiership | 11 | 0 | 0 | 0 | 0 | 0 | 0 | 0 | 0 | 0 | 11 | 0 |
| Celtic | 2018–19 | Scottish Premiership | 4 | 0 | 0 | 0 | 3 | 0 | 8 (Note: Six appearances in UEFA Champions League, two appearances in UEFA Europa League) | 0 | 0 | 0 | 15 | 0 |
| Celtic | 2019–20 | Scottish Premiership | 0 | 0 | 0 | 0 | 1 | 0 | 0 | 0 | 0 | 0 | 1 | 0 |
| Celtic | Total | | 15 | 0 | 0 | 0 | 4 | 0 | 8 | 0 | 0 | 0 | 27 | 0 |
| Melbourne City (loan) | 2019–20 | A-League | 2 | 0 | — | | — | | — | | — | | 2 | 0 |
| KV Oostende (loan) | 2020–21 | Belgian Pro League | 30 | 2 | 0 | 0 | — | | — | | — | | 30 | 2 |
| KV Oostende | 2021–22 | Belgian Pro League | 6 | 0 | 0 | 0 | — | | — | | — | | 6 | 0 |
| Club Brugge | 2021–22 | Belgian Pro League | 23 | 1 | 3 | 0 | — | | 6 (Note: Appearance(s) in UEFA Champions League) | 0 | — | | 32 | 1 |
| Club Brugge | 2022–23 | Belgian Pro League | 8 | 0 | 0 | 0 | — | | 1 | 0 | — | | 9 | 0 |
| Club Brugge | Total | | 31 | 1 | 3 | 0 | — | | 7 | 0 | — | | 41 | 1 |
| Cremonese (loan) | 2022–23 | Serie A | 4 | 0 | 2 | 0 | — | | — | | — | | 6 | 0 |
| Al-Ettifaq | 2023–24 | Saudi Pro League | 34 | 0 | 2 | 0 | — | | — | | — | | 36 | 0 |
| Al-Ettifaq | 2024–25 | Saudi Pro League | 15 | 0 | 0 | 0 | — | | — | | 4 (Note: Appearances in AGCFF Gulf Club Champions League) | 0 | 19 | 0 |
| Al-Ettifaq | 2025–26 | Saudi Pro League | 30 | 1 | 1 | 0 | — | | — | | — | | 31 | 1 |
| Al-Ettifaq | 2026–27 | Saudi Pro League | 5 | 1 | 0 | 0 | — | | — | | 0 | 0 | 5 | 1 |
| Al-Ettifaq | Total | | 84 | 2 | 3 | 0 | — | | — | | 4 | 0 | 91 | 2 |
| Career total | | | 213 | 6 | 11 | 0 | 10 | 1 | 15 | 0 | 10 | 0 | 259 | 7 |

=== International ===
As of match played 6 October 2026

Appearances and goals by national team and year
| National team | Year | Apps | Goals |
|---|---|---|---|
| Scotland | 2018 | 3 | 0 |
| Scotland | 2021 | 9 | 1 |
| Scotland | 2022 | 9 | 2 |
| Scotland | 2023 | 7 | 0 |
| Scotland | 2024 | 6 | 0 |
| Scotland | 2025 | 2 | 0 |
| Scotland | 2026 | 8 | 0 |
| Total | | 44 | 3 |

Scores and results list Scotland's goal tally first, score column indicates score after each Hendry goal.

List of international goals scored by Jack Hendry
| No. | Date | Venue | Opponent | Score | Result | Competition | Ref. |
|---|---|---|---|---|---|---|---|
| 1 | 2 June 2021 | Estádio Algarve, Faro/Loulé, Portugal | Netherlands | 1–0 | 2–2 | Friendly | |
| 2 | 29 March 2022 | Ernst-Happel-Stadion, Vienna, Austria | Austria | 1–0 | 2–2 | Friendly | |
| 3 | 24 September 2022 | Hampden Park, Glasgow, Scotland | Republic of Ireland | 1–1 | 2–1 | UEFA Nations League | |

== Honours ==
Celtic

- Scottish Premiership: 2017–18, 2018–19
- Scottish Cup: 2017–18, 2018–19
- Scottish League Cup: 2018–19

Club Brugge

- Belgian Pro League: 2021–22
- Belgian Super Cup: 2022
