= Frederik Jäkel =

German footballer (born 2001)

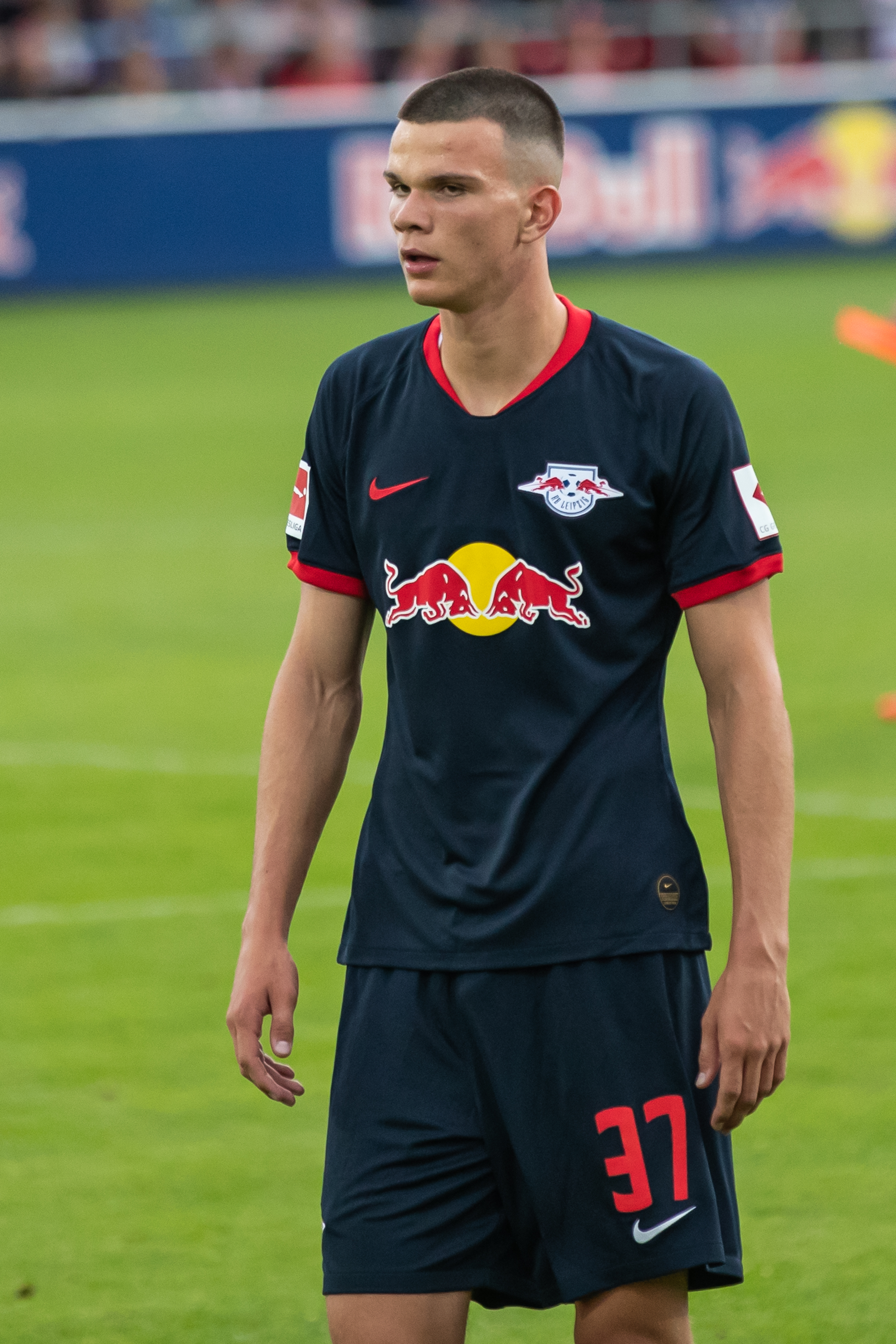
- Jäkel with RB Leipzig in 2019

Personal information
- Date of birth: 7 March 2001 (age 25)
- Place of birth: Dommitzsch, Germany
- Height: 1.93 m (6 ft 4 in)
- Position: Defender

Team information
- Current team: Eintracht Braunschweig
- Number: 5

Youth career
- –2012: Dommitzscher SV Grün-Weiß
- 2012–2019: RB Leipzig

Senior career*
Years	Team	Apps	(Gls)
2019–2026	RB Leipzig	0	(0)
2020–2022	→ Oostende (loan)	36	(3)
2022–2023	→ Arminia Bielefeld (loan)	25	(1)
2023–2025	→ SV Elversberg (loan)	19	(1)
2025–2026	→ Eintracht Braunschweig (loan)	1	(0)
2026–	Eintracht Braunschweig	0	(0)

International career^{‡}
2018–2019	Germany U18	4	(0)
2019	Germany U19	7	(0)
- * Club domestic league appearances and goals as of 28 December 2025 ‡ National team caps and goals as of 28 December 2020

Frederik Jäkel (born 7 March 2001) is a German professional footballer who plays as a defender for 2. Bundesliga club Eintracht Braunschweig.

== Club career ==
At under-13 level, Jäkel moved from his hometown club Dommitzscher SV Grün-Weiß to the youth academy of RB Leipzig while attending seventh grade at Sportgymnasium Leipzig. In the 2017–18 season he made 19 appearances in the Under 17 Bundesliga, scoring one goal. He also played twice in the play-offs. He also scored one goal the following season, this time playing 20 games in the Under 19 Bundesliga.

On 25 April 2019, Jäkel signed his first professional contract with RB Leipzig. In the 2019–20 season, he captained the Leipzig under-19 team. With them, he appeared in the UEFA Youth League. For the first team, he was included in the squad for the first time on 1 March 2020 against Bayer Leverkusen.

On 14 July 2020, Jäkel was loaned to Oostende for 2 years. Jäkel made his professional debut with Oostende in a 2-1 Belgian First Division A loss to Anderlecht on 15 December 2020.

On 20 June 2022, Jäkel moved on a new loan to Arminia Bielefeld, with an option to buy.

On 1 August 2023, Jäkel was loaned out by RB Leipzig once again for a season, to SV Elversberg in 2. Bundesliga. On 7 June 2024, the loan was extended for the 2024–25 season. He missed most of the 2024–25 season due to knee injuries.

On 4 July 2025, Jäkel joined Eintracht Braunschweig in 2. Bundesliga on loan, with an option to buy. On 3 June 2026, the transfer was made permanent and Jäkel signed a two-year contract with Eintracht.

== International career ==
Jäkel gained four caps for the Germany under-18 team. He made seven appearances at under-19 level, including three in the 2020 UEFA European Under-19 Championship qualification.

== Career statistics ==
As of match played 9 August 2025

Appearances and goals by club, season and competition
Club	Season	League			Cup		Europe		Other		Total	
Club	Season	Division	Apps	Goals	Apps	Goals	Apps	Goals	Apps	Goals	Apps	Goals
RB Leipzig	2019–20	Bundesliga	0	0	0	0	0	0	0	0	0	0
Oostende (loan)	2020–21	Belgian Pro League	11	0	1	0	—		5 (Note: Appearances in European play-offs)	0	17	0
Oostende (loan)	2021–22	Belgian Pro League	25	3	1	0	—		—		26	3
Oostende (loan)	Total		36	3	2	0	—		5	0	43	3
Arminia Bielefeld (loan)	2022–23	2. Bundesliga	25	1	0	0	—		2 (Note: Appearances in relegation play-offs)	0	27	1
SV Elversberg (loan)	2023–24	2. Bundesliga	18	1	0	0	—		—		18	1
SV Elversberg (loan)	2024–25	2. Bundesliga	1	0	0	0	—		0	0	1	0
SV Elversberg (loan)	Total		19	1	0	0	—		0	0	19	1
Eintracht Braunschweig (loan)	2025–26	2. Bundesliga	1	0	0	0	—		—		1	0
Eintracht Braunschweig	2026–27	2. Bundesliga	0	0	0	0	—		—		0	0
Career total			81	5	2	0	0	0	7	0	90	5

== Honours ==
Individual

- Fritz Walter Medal U19 Bronze: 2020
