= Milan Troonbeeckx =

Belgian footballer

Personal information
- Date of birth: 20 February 2002 (age 24)
- Height: 1.72 m (5 ft 8 in)
- Position: Attacking midfielder

Team information
- Current team: Wezel Sport (on loan from Lommel)
- Number: 20

Youth career
- Westerlo
- Lierse
- 2018–2019: Dessel Sport

Senior career*
Years	Team	Apps	(Gls)
2019–2020	Dessel Sport	6	(1)
2020–	Lommel	10	(0)
2022–2023	→ Thes Sport (loan)	28	(1)
2023–	→ Wezel Sport (loan)	0	(0)
- * Club domestic league appearances and goals as of 08:58, 10 August 2023 (UTC)

Milan Troonbeeckx (born 20 February 2002) is a Belgian professional footballer who plays as an attacking midfielder for FC Wezel Sport, on loan from Lommel.

== Early life ==
He attended Heilig Hartcollege in Heist-op-den-Berg.

== Career ==
After playing youth football for Westerlo and Lierse, he signed for Dessel Sport in 2018, before being promoted to their senior team a year later. After coming on as an 80th-minute substitute for Thomas Jutten against Rupel Boom on 23 November 2019 to make his senior debut, he scored Dessel's fourth goal of a 4–0 win in the 84th-minute after tapping in a Mike Smet cross. He scored once in six league games for Dessel in the 2019–20 season.

In July 2020, he signed for Lommel of the Belgian First Division B on a three-year contract.

On 24 August 2022, Troonbeeckx was loaned to Thes Sport for the 2022–23 season.

In July 2023, Troonbeeckx joined FC Wezel Sport on a season-long loan deal.
