= Kévin Vandendriessche =

French footballer (born 1989)

Personal information
- Date of birth: 7 August 1989 (age 37)
- Place of birth: Lesquin, France
- Height: 1.83 m (6 ft 0 in)
- Position: Midfielder

Team information
- Current team: Francs Borains
- Number: 31

Youth career
- 2007–2008: US Fretin

Senior career*
Years	Team	Apps	(Gls)
2008–2009	Guingamp II		
2010–2012	Wasquehal	12	(4)
2012–2015	Mouscron	90	(10)
2015–2021	Oostende	201	(13)
2021–2023	Kortrijk	36	(2)
2023–	Francs Borains	19	(1)
- * Club domestic league appearances and goals as of 12 May 2024

Kévin Vandendriessche (born 7 August 1989) is a French footballer of Belgian descent who plays as a midfielder for Belgian club Francs Borains.

== Club career ==
On 8 January 2021, he signed a two-year contract with Kortrijk which began in July 2021.

For the 2023–24 season, Vandendriessche signed with Francs Borains, newly promoted to Challenger Pro League.
