= Arthur Theate =

Belgian footballer (born 2000)

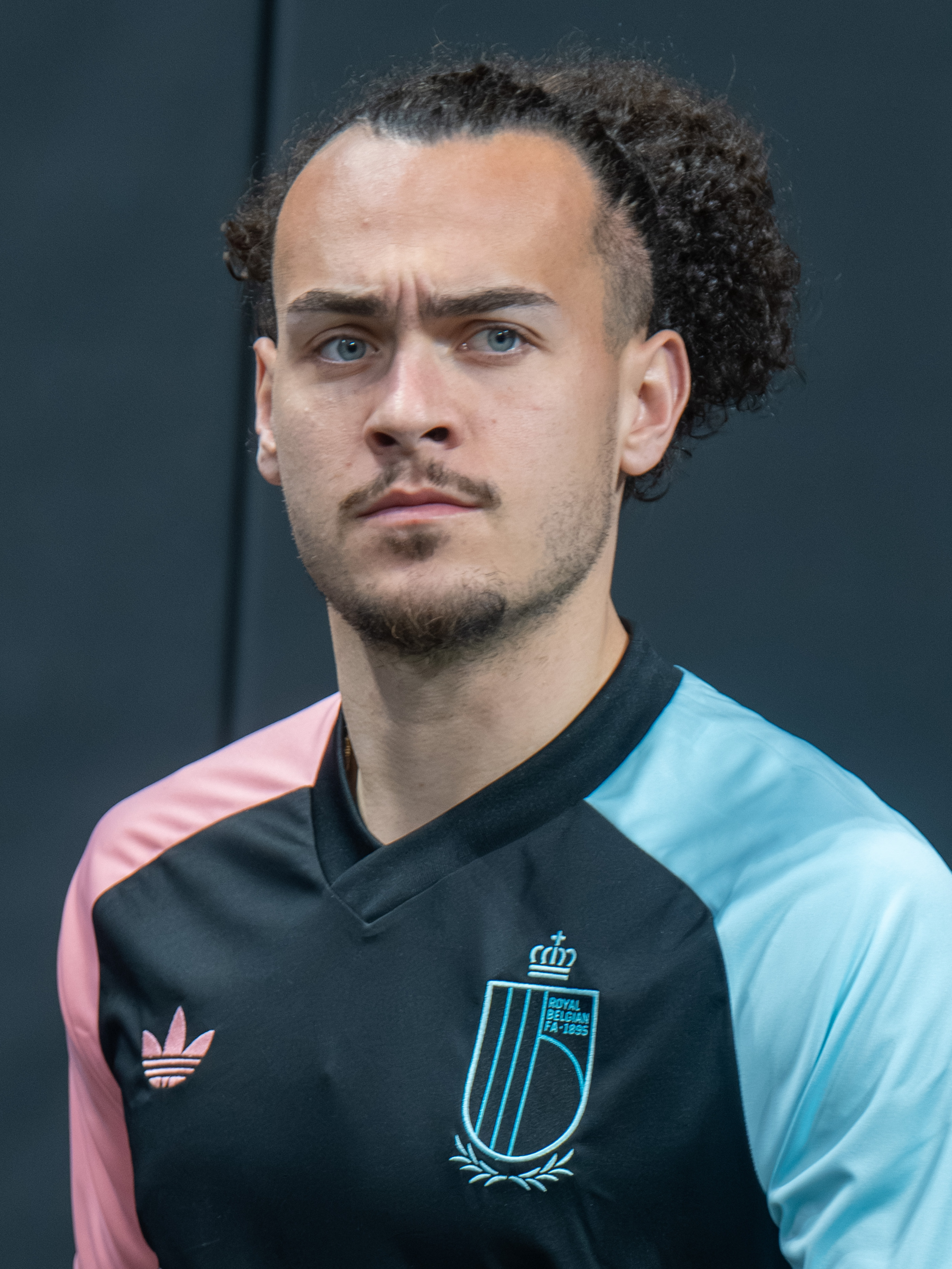
- Theate with Belgium in 2026

Personal information
- Full name: Arthur Nicolas R. Theate
- Date of birth: 25 May 2000 (age 26)
- Place of birth: Liège, Belgium
- Height: 1.85 m (6 ft 1 in)
- Positions: Centre-back; left-back

Team information
- Current team: Bologna (on loan from Eintracht Frankfurt)
- Number: 3

Youth career
- 2005–2009: Alliance Melen-Micheroux
- 2009–2011: Eupen
- 2011–2014: Genk
- 2014–2017: Standard Liège
- 2017–2019: Genk
- 2019–2020: Standard Liège

Senior career*
Years	Team	Apps	(Gls)
2020–2022	Oostende	38	(5)
2021–2022	→ Bologna (loan)	31	(2)
2022–2025	Rennes	63	(6)
2024–2025	→ Eintracht Frankfurt (loan)	18	(0)
2025–	Eintracht Frankfurt	37	(1)
2026–	→ Bologna (loan)	8	(1)

International career^{‡}
2015	Belgium U15	4	(0)
2015	Belgium U16	1	(0)
2017	Belgium U17	1	(0)
2017–2018	Belgium U18	7	(0)
2018–2019	Belgium U19	6	(0)
2021	Belgium U21	3	(0)
2021–	Belgium	37	(1)
- * Club domestic league appearances and goals as of 09:49, 8 November 2026 (UTC) ‡ National team caps and goals as of 15 November 2026

Arthur Nicolas R. Theate (French pronunciation: [aʁtyʁ te.at]; born 25 May 2000) is a Belgian professional footballer who plays as a centre-back or left-back for Serie A club Bologna, on loan from Bundesliga club Eintracht Frankfurt, and the Belgium national team.

== Club career ==
=== Early career ===
Theate played youth football for Alliance Melen-Micheroux, Eupen, Genk and Standard Liège. Until reaching the under-14 level, he played as a striker at Eupen. At Genk, he was repositioned as a left winger after the arrival of a new player, after which he moved to the position of left-back and then centre-back. During his time at the Genk youth academy, his future at times looked uncertain, and he was described as being physically tough, but not always refined.

After three years playing for the Genk youth teams, he joined Standard Liège where he also struggled with regular midfielder Damjan Pavlović being played as left-back in the youth team to replace Theate. He soon returned to Genk, where he trained with the first team during the 2019–20 pre-season under head coach Felice Mazzù. After this, however, Theate failed to make the cut and was demoted to the reserves. He returned to Standard in 2019, but barely a year after his return, Standard let him go again.

=== Oostende ===
In the summer of 2020, Theate saw no prospects of succeeding at Standard Liège, after which he was offered a trial with Belgian First Division A club Oostende. After a week of practicing with the first team, he was able to convince German coach Alexander Blessin of his abilities. Blessin mainly noticed his explosiveness and power, ideal for his high five-man backline and Gegenpressing tactics. Previously, Theate had not been able to convince Lommel or Lierse Kempenzonen during trials.

In July 2020, he signed a three-year contract with an option with Oostende. Theate made his debut on 10 August 2020 in the Belgian First Division A against Beerschot, featuring in starting line-up. Together with Anton Tanghe he grew into the permanent centre-back duo in the Oostende defence. On 4 October 2020, he scored his first professional goal, heading home a cross against Royal Excel Mouscron putting his team in a good position ahead of their 3–0 victory.

During the winter transfer period of the 2020–21 season, Oostende received an offer for Theate of €5 million from Italian club Bologna, but the Belgian coastal club refused. In his first season at Oostende, he managed to qualify for European play-offs, but eventually missed out. He missed only one game due to suspension and four matches due to injury, playing the entirety of the other 27 matches.

In the 2021–22 season, Theate did not make an appearance during the first two matchdays pending a possible transfer. On the third matchday of the season, he returned to the starting line-up against Gent. On 22 August 2021, he picked up a red card in his last game for Oostende against his former club Standard. Theate played a total of 40 official matches for Oostende, in which he scored five goals.

=== Bologna ===
On 26 August 2021, Theate signed for Serie A club Bologna on initial season-long loan, with a subsequent obligation to buy.

On 18 September 2021, Theate made his debut against defending champions Inter Milan on the fourth matchday of the season. Theate came on as a substitute in the 74th minute behind 6–0 and headed in the 6–1 final score twelve minutes later. Bologna had started the season with a four-man defense, but after conceding twelve goals in three games, coach Siniša Mihajlović started the game against Lazio on 3 October with five at the back with Theate as left-sided centre-back. This was also his first start for the club. Theate contributed with an assist and a goal in the 3–0 win.

Theate impressed during his season at Bologna, making 31 league appearances in which he scored twice and provided one assist.

=== Rennes ===
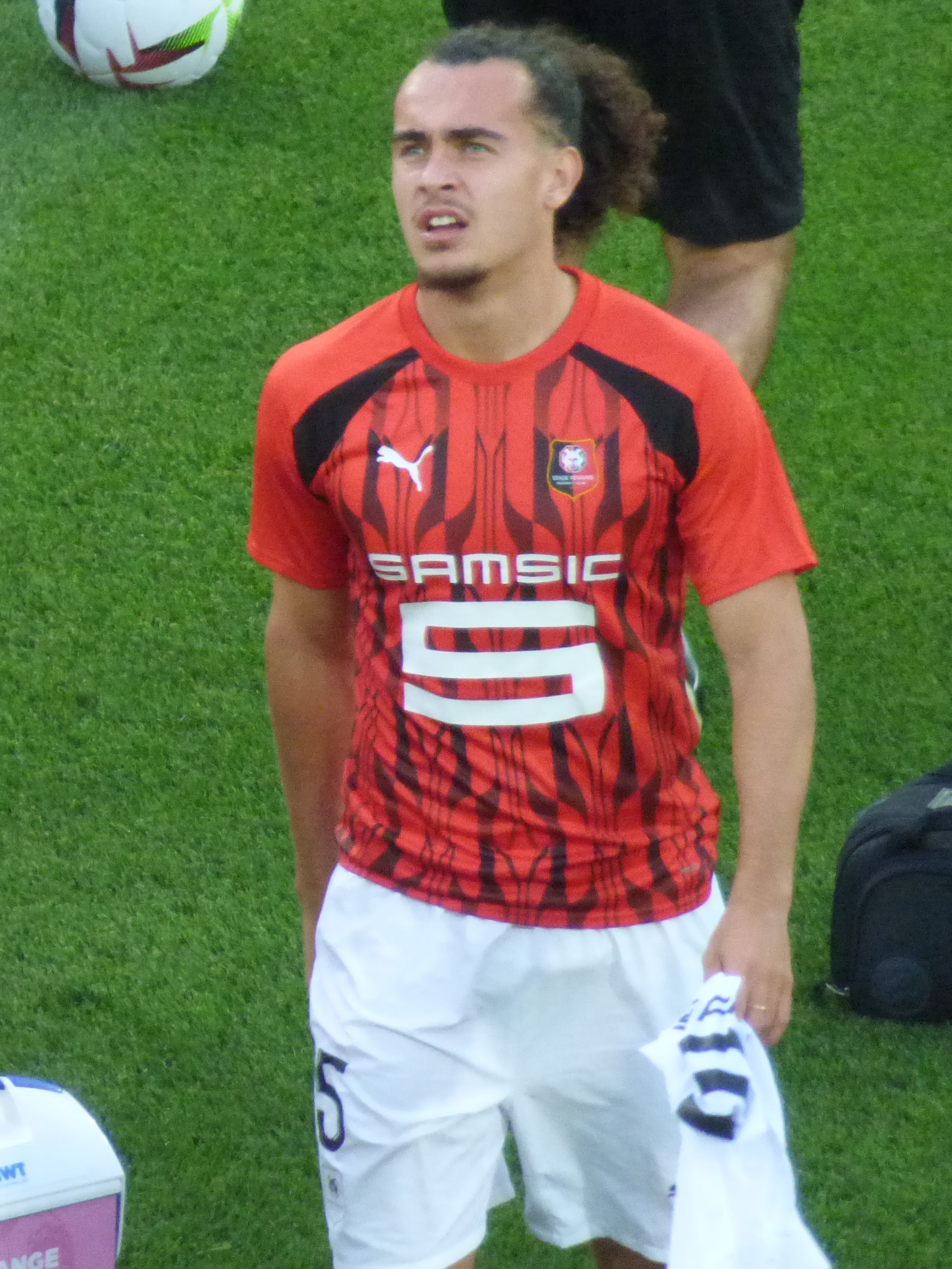
Theate with Rennes in 2023.

On 29 July 2022, Theate joined Ligue 1 club Rennes on a four-year deal, for a reported fee of €20 million, making him the most expensive Belgian defender ever, above Thomas Vermaelen's 2014 move from Arsenal to Barcelona for €19 million. Theate was to succeed Nayef Aguerd who had left for West Ham United.

On the first matchday of the 2022–23 Ligue 1 season, Theate made his Rennes debut in the starting lineup against Lorient. He scored an own goal in the 65th minute, which proved to be decisive in the 1–0 loss. On 21 August, Theate scored his first goal for the club against Ajaccio, heading home the 2–1 winner. He also scored in his European debut with a strike from distance against AEK Larnaca in the UEFA Europa League group stage, as Rennes won the game 2–1. In Rennes' 1–0 league win over league leaders Paris Saint-Germain, Theate was praised for shutting down Lionel Messi in a strong performance.

On 14 September 2023, Theate signed a new contract with Rennes until June 2027.

==== Loan to Eintracht Frankfurt ====
On 18 August 2024, Theate joined Bundesliga club Eintracht Frankfurt on loan for the 2024–25 season, with the German club having an option to buy after the season.

=== Eintracht Frankfurt ===
On 2 February 2025, Eintracht signed Theate permanently. Later that year, on 22 November, he scored his first goal for the club in a 4–3 away victory over 1.FC Köln.

==== Loan to Bologna ====
On 30 August 2026, Theate rejoined Bologna on a season-long loan with an option to buy for €15 million.

== International career ==
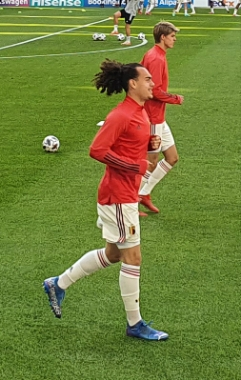
Theate warming up for the 2021 Nations League game against Italy

Theate received his first call-up to the senior Belgium squad for the 2021 UEFA Nations League Finals. He made his debut on 16 November 2021 in a World Cup qualifier against Wales.

He was selected for national coach Roberto Martínez's squad ahead of the 2022 FIFA World Cup, but failed to make an appearance as the Red Devils were knocked out of the tournament at the group stages for the first time since 1998.

On 15 May 2026, he was named in the 26-man squad for the 2026 FIFA World Cup.

== Career statistics ==
=== Club ===
As of match played 7 November 2026

Appearances and goals by club, season and competition
Club	Season	League			National cup (Note: Includes Belgian Cup, Coupe de France, DFB-Pokal)		Continental		Total	
Club	Season	Division	Apps	Goals	Apps	Goals	Apps	Goals	Apps	Goals
KV Oostende	2020–21	Belgian Pro League	35	5	2	0	—		37	5
KV Oostende	2021–22	Belgian Pro League	3	0	0	0	—		3	0
KV Oostende	Total		38	5	2	0	—		40	5
Bologna (loan)	2021–22	Serie A	31	2	0	0	—		31	2
Rennes	2022–23	Ligue 1	35	4	2	0	5 (Note: Appearances in UEFA Europa League)	1	42	5
Rennes	2023–24	Ligue 1	28	2	4	1	8	0	40	3
Rennes	Total		63	6	5	1	13	1	81	8
Eintracht Frankfurt (loan)	2024–25	Bundesliga	18	0	1	0	7	0	26	0
Eintracht Frankfurt	2024–25	Bundesliga	13	0	—		3	0	16	0
Eintracht Frankfurt	2025–26	Bundesliga	24	1	1	0	8 (Note: Appearances in UEFA Champions League)	0	33	1
Eintracht Frankfurt	Total		37	1	1	0	11	0	49	1
Bologna (loan)	2026–27	Serie A	8	1	0	0	—		8	1
Career total			195	15	9	1	31	1	235	17

=== International ===
As of match played 15 November 2026

Appearances and goals by national team and year
National team	Year	Apps	Goals
Belgium	2021	1	0
Belgium	2022	3	0
Belgium	2023	10	0
Belgium	2024	9	0
Belgium	2025	8	1
Belgium	2026	6	0
Total		37	1

Scores and results list Belgium's goal tally first, score column indicates score after each Theate goal.

List of international goals scored by Arthur Theate
No.	Date	Venue	Cap	Opponent	Score	Result	Competition
1	4 September 2025	Rheinpark Stadion, Vaduz, Liechtenstein	26	Liechtenstein	3–0	6–0	2026 FIFA World Cup qualification
