= Batimont Solar Park =

Multi-use stadium in Ostend, Belgium

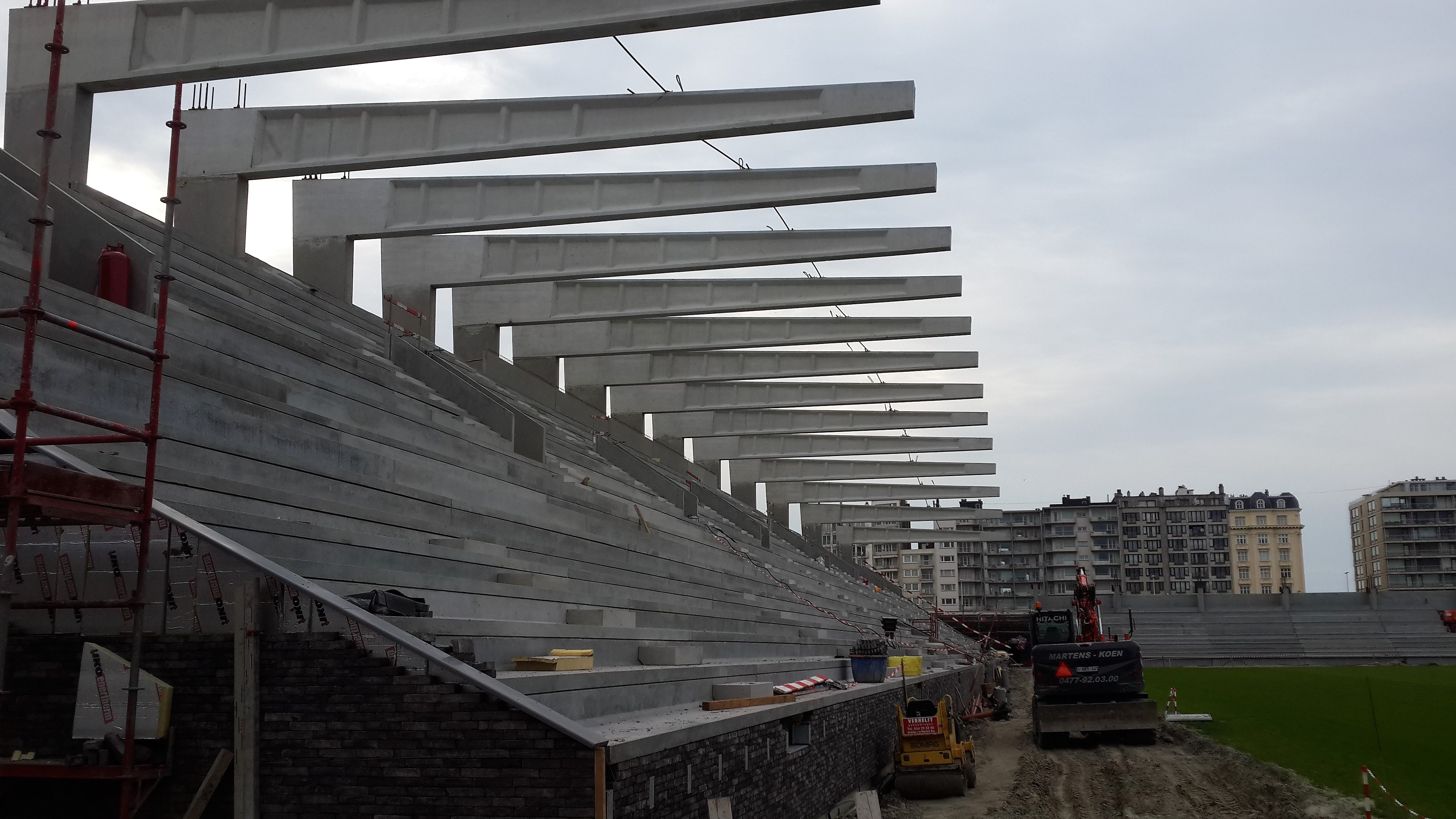
- Diaz Arena under reconstruction in 2016.
- Interactive map of Batimont Solar Park
- Former names: Albertparkstadion (until 2016); Versluys Arena (2016-2020); Diaz Arena (2020-2024)
- Location: Ostend, Belgium
- Coordinates: 51°13′01″N 2°53′11″E
- Capacity: 8,432
- Surface: Grass
- Field size: 120 m × 68 m

Construction
- Opened: 1934
- Renovated: 2007
- Expanded: 2017

Tenants
- A.S. Oostende (1934–1981); K.V. Oostende (1981–2024); K.V. Diksmuide-Oostende (2024–present)

Batimont Solar Park is a multi-use stadium in Ostend, Belgium. It is mostly used for football matches and is the home ground of K.V. Diksmuide Oostende (since 2024) and the former home of A.S. Oostende (1934 to 1981) then K.V. Oostende (1981 to 2024). The stadium holds a capacity of 8,432.
