= Robbie D'Haese =

Belgian footballer

Personal information
- Date of birth: 25 February 1999 (age 27)
- Place of birth: Ostend, Belgium
- Height: 1.80 m (5 ft 11 in)
- Position: Forward

Youth career
- Oostende

Senior career*
Years	Team	Apps	(Gls)
2018–2024	Oostende	122	(5)
2024–2025	Rot-Weiss Essen	10	(0)

International career^{‡}
2016–2017	Belgium U18	3	(0)
2017	Belgium U19	7	(0)
- * Club domestic league appearances and goals as of 2 February 2025 ‡ National team caps and goals as of 3 July 2018

Robbie D'Haese (born 25 February 1999) is a Belgian professional footballer who plays as a forward.

== Club career ==
On 21 June 2024, D'Haese signed with Rot-Weiss Essen in German 3. Liga.
