= Guillaume Hubert =

Belgian footballer

Personal information
- Date of birth: 11 January 1994 (age 32)
- Place of birth: Charleroi, Belgium
- Height: 1.98 m (6 ft 6 in)
- Position: Goalkeeper

Team information
- Current team: RWDM
- Number: 28

Youth career
- 2001-2003: RLC Hornu
- 2003–2005: R Sp. Bosquetia Frameries
- 2005–2006: Mons
- 2006–2007: Sporting Charleroi
- 2007–2009: Standard Liège
- 2009–2011: Valenciennes FC

Senior career*
Years	Team	Apps	(Gls)
2011–2012	Valenciennes II	11	(0)
2012–2017	Standard Liège	28	(0)
2015	→ Sint-Truiden (loan)	0	(0)
2017–2020	Club Brugge	4	(0)
2019–2020	→ Cercle Brugge (loan)	8	(0)
2020–2023	Oostende	85	(0)
2023–	RWDM	8	(0)

International career
2009	Belgium U15	5	(0)
2009–2010	Belgium U-16	6	(0)
2010–2011	Belgium U-17	3	(0)
2012	Belgium U-18	1	(0)
2012–2013	Belgium U-19	2	(0)
2014–2016	Belgium U-21	2	(0)
- * Club domestic league appearances and goals as of 16 January 2025

Guillaume Hubert (born 11 January 1994) is a Belgian professional footballer who plays for RWDM as a goalkeeper.

== Club career ==
Hubert is a youth exponent from Standard Liège. On 25 October 2015, he made his Belgian Pro League debut with Standard Liège against Charleroi. In June 2017, he joined Club Brugge.

On 27 June 2023, Hubert signed a three-season contract with RWDM.

== Career statistics ==
=== Club ===
As of match played 2 August 2017

Appearances and goals by club, season and competition
Club	Season	League			National cup		Continental		Other		Total	
Club	Season	Division	Apps	Goals	Apps	Goals	Apps	Goals	Apps	Goals	Apps	Goals
Valenciennes II	2011–12	CFA2	11	0	–		–		–		11	0
Standard Liège	2012–13	Pro League	0	0	0	0	0	0	0	0	0	0
Standard Liège	2013–14	Pro League	0	0	0	0	0	0	0	0	0	0
Standard Liège	2014–15	Pro League	0	0	0	0	0	0	0	0	0	0
Standard Liège	2015–16	Pro League	18	0	4	0	0	0	0	0	22	0
Standard Liège	Total		18	0	4	0	0	0	0	0	22	0
Club Brugge	2016–17	First Division A	10	0	0	0	3 (Note: Appearances in the Europa League)	0	0	0	13	0
Club Brugge	2017–18	First Division A	0	0	0	0	0	0	0	0	0	0
Club Brugge	Total		10	0	0	0	3	0	0	0	13	00
Career total			39	0	4	0	3	0	0	0	46	0

== Honours ==
Standard Liège

- Belgian Cup: 2015–16
