= Maxime D'Arpino =

French footballer (born 1996)

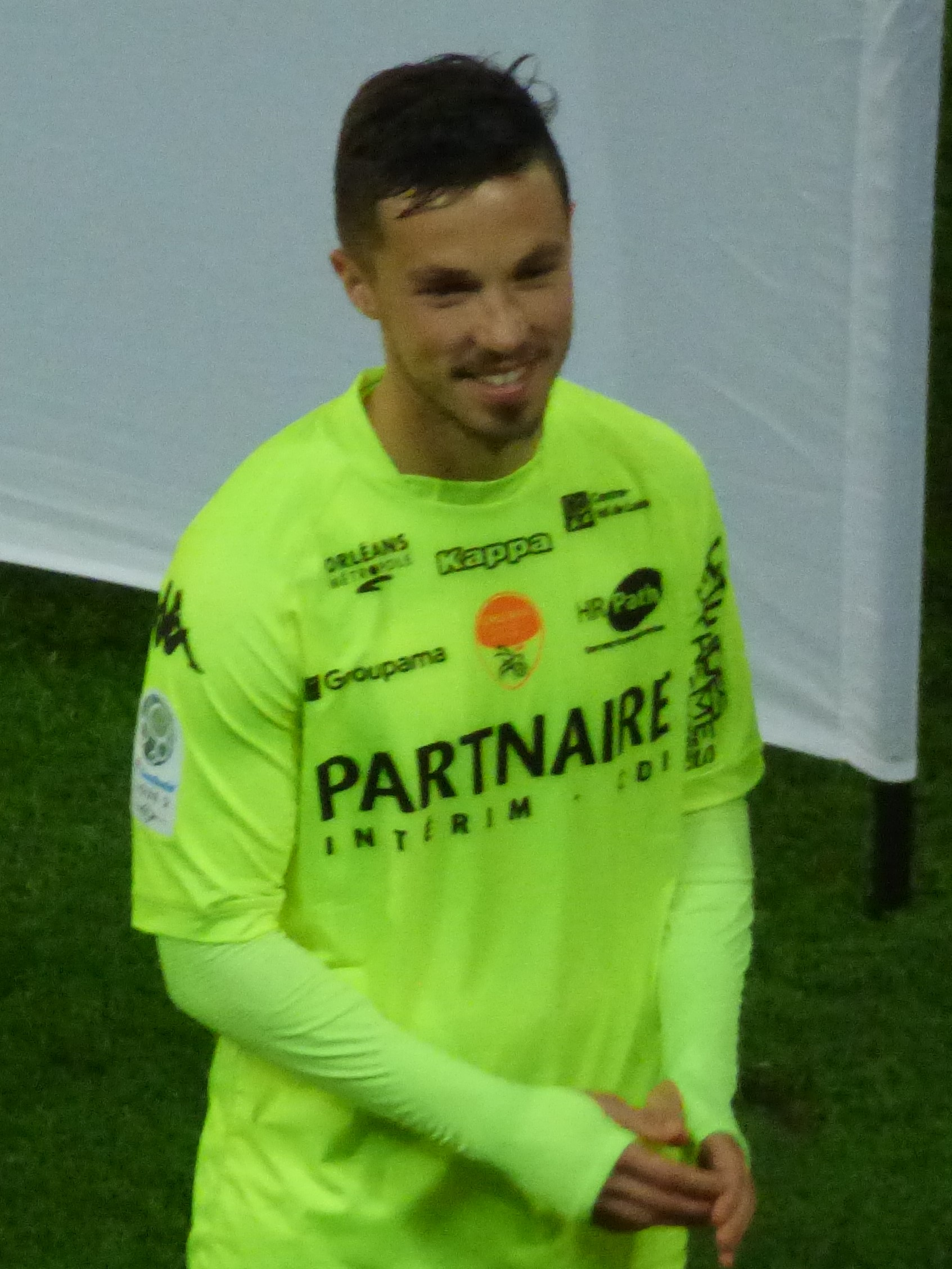
- D'Arpino with Orléans in March 2020

Personal information
- Date of birth: 17 June 1996 (age 30)
- Place of birth: Villeurbanne, France
- Height: 1.75 m (5 ft 9 in)
- Position: Midfielder

Team information
- Current team: GOAL FC

Youth career
- 2002–2004: AS Univ. Lyon
- 2004–2006: Saint-Priest
- 2006–2015: Lyon

Senior career*
Years	Team	Apps	(Gls)
2014–2017	Lyon B	68	(9)
2017–2018	Lyon	0	(0)
2017–2018	→ Orléans (loan)	23	(0)
2018–2020	Orléans	15	(3)
2020–2024	Oostende	86	(6)
2024–2025	Orléans	22	(0)
2025–	GOAL FC	0	(0)

International career^{‡}
2014	France U19	5	(0)
2016	France U20	4	(0)
- * Club domestic league appearances and goals as of 3 December 2025 ‡ National team caps and goals as of 17 September 2017

Maxime D'Arpino (born 17 June 1996) is a French professional footballer who plays as a midfielder for Championnat National 1 club GOAL FC.

== Professional career ==
D'Arpino joined Olympique Lyonnais in 2006 at the age of 10, and signed his first professional contract with them in 2015. In June 2017, he joined Ligue 2 side US Orléans on loan for the 2017–18 season. He made his professional debut with Orléans in a 3–1 Ligue 2 win over AS Nancy on 28 July 2017.

On 30 June 2020, D'Arpino signed a 4-year contract with Oostende in Belgium.

On 15 July 2024, he returned to Orléans on a two-season deal.

== Career statistics ==
As of match played on 1 July 2019

Appearances and goals by club, season and competition
Club	Season	League			Cup		League Cup		Other		Total	
Club	Season	Division	Apps	Goals	Apps	Goals	Apps	Goals	Apps	Goals	Apps	Goals
Lyon B	2013–14	CFA	3	1	—		—		—		3	1
Lyon B	2014–15	CFA	19	1	—		—		—		19	1
Lyon B	2015–16	CFA	26	5	—		—		—		26	5
Lyon B	2016–17	CFA	20	2	—		—		—		20	2
Lyon B	Total		68	9	0	0	0	0	0	0	68	9
Orléans (loan)	2017–18	Ligue 2	23	0	0	0	2	0	—		25	0
Orléans	2018–19	Ligue 2	15	3	5	1	1	0	—		21	4
Career totals			106	12	5	1	3	0	0	0	114	13
