= Anton Tanghe =

Belgian footballer (born 1999)

Personal information
- Full name: Anton Willy Tanghe
- Date of birth: 28 January 1999 (age 27)
- Place of birth: Lauwe, Belgium
- Height: 1.94 m (6 ft 4 in)
- Position: Centre-back

Youth career
- 2016–2019: Club Brugge
- 2019–2020: Oostende

Senior career*
Years	Team	Apps	(Gls)
2020–2024	Oostende	97	(2)
2024–2026	Zulte Waregem	58	(4)

International career
2017	Belgium U18	3	(0)
2017	Belgium U19	2	(0)
- * Club domestic league appearances and goals as of 30 August 2026

Anton Tanghe (born 28 January 1999) is a Belgian professional footballer who plays as a centre-back.

== Club career ==
Tanghe is a youth product of Club Brugge, and signed with Oostende in the summer of 2019. He made his professional debut for Oostende in a 2–1 Belgian First Division A loss to Standard Liège on 24 January 2020.
