= Théo Ndicka =

French footballer (born 2000)

Personal information
- Full name: Théo Ndicka Matam
- Date of birth: 20 April 2000 (age 26)
- Place of birth: Avallon, France
- Height: 1.69 m (5 ft 7 in)
- Position: Left-back

Team information
- Current team: Oleksandriya
- Number: 16

Youth career
- 2006–2010: Avallonnais
- 2010–2013: Dijon
- 2013–2015: ASPTT Dijon
- 2015–2018: Lyon

Senior career*
Years	Team	Apps	(Gls)
2018–2020	Lyon II	32	(4)
2019–2020	→ Bourg-en-Bresse (loan)	18	(3)
2020–2023	Oostende	75	(3)
2023–2025	Grasshopper	32	(1)
2025–	Oleksandriya	12	(1)

International career^{‡}
2016	France U16	3	(1)
2019	France U19	11	(0)
2019	France U20	4	(1)
2020	France U21	1	(0)
- * Club domestic league appearances and goals as of 24 December 2025 ‡ National team caps and goals as of 28 December 2020

Théo Ndicka Matam (born 20 April 2000) is a French professional footballer who plays as a left-back for Ukrainian Premier League club Oleksandriya.

== Professional career ==
Ndicka is a youth product of Lyon, and began his career with their reserve side before joining Bourg-en-Bresse on loan for the 2019–20 season. On 2 July 2020, Ndicka signed a professional contract with Oostende. Ndicka made his professional debut with Oostende in a 1–0 Belgian First Division A loss to Charleroi on 15 August 2020.

On 29 August 2023, he signed a two-year contract, with an option for a further year, with Swiss Super League side Grasshopper Club Zürich. On 2 December 2023, he scored the final goal in a 5–0 rout of FC Lausanne-Sport. On 7 January 2025, his contract with Grasshoppers was terminated by mutual consent, as he no longer featured in the first team. His final game for the first team was on 31 August 2024, in which he played just one minute.

On 15 January 2025, Ndicka signed a contract with Ukrainian club Oleksandriya until 30 June 2026, with an option to extend for one more season.

== International career ==
Born in France, Ndicka is of Cameroonian descent. He is a youth international for France.
