= 2025 Belgian Cup final =

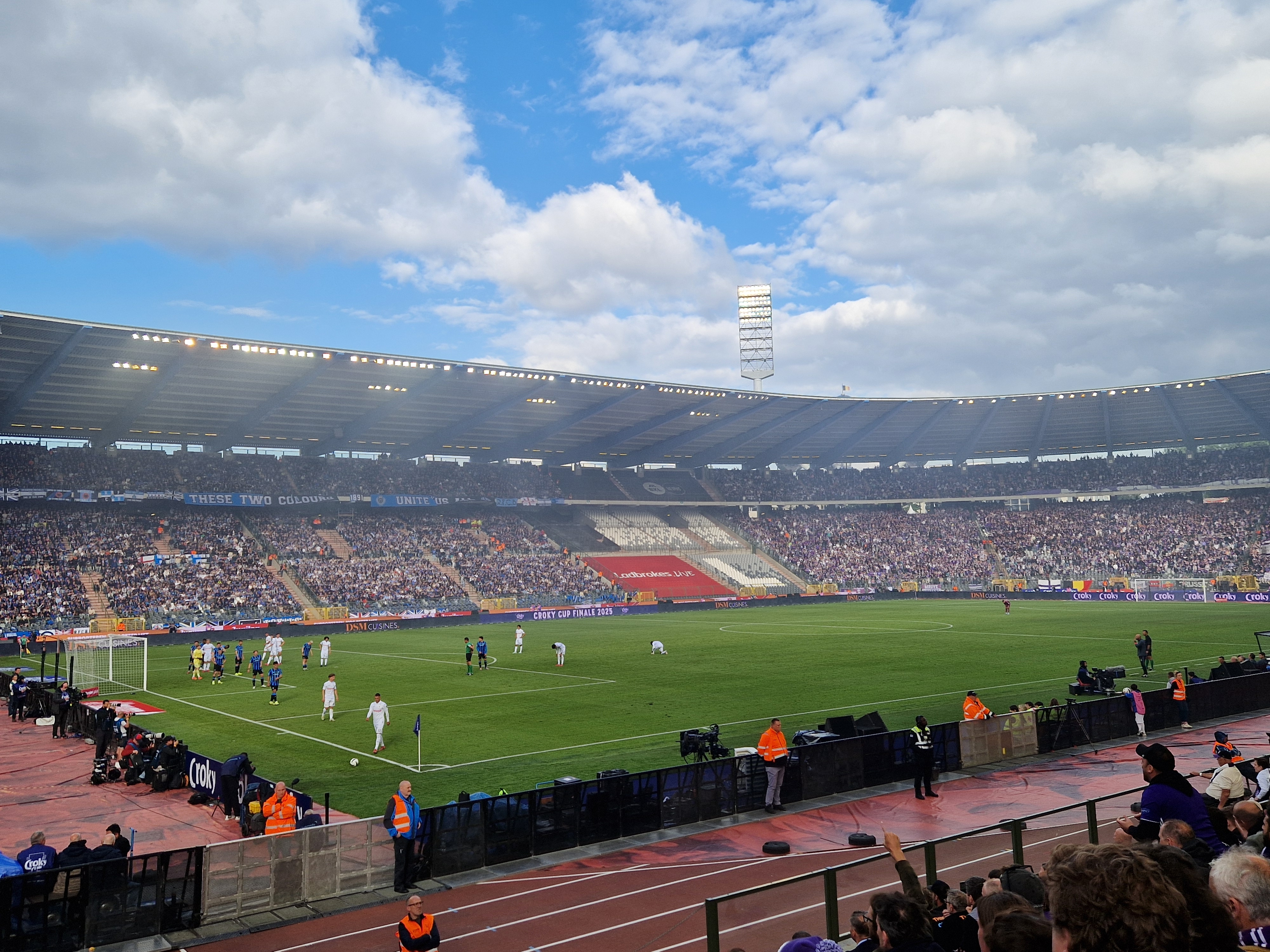
- Event: 2024–25 Belgian Cup
Club Brugge	Anderlecht
2	1
- Date: 4 May 2025
- Venue: King Baudouin Stadium, Brussels
- Referee: Jasper Vergoote
- Attendance: 40,861
- Weather: Sunny

The 2025 Belgian Cup final, named Croky Cup after the sponsor, was the 70th Belgian Cup final. It was played on 4 May 2025 between rivals Club Brugge and Anderlecht.

== Route to the final ==
Club Brugge				Anderlecht
Opponent	Result	Scorers	Round	Opponent	Result	Scorers
Belisia Bilzen (III)	6–1 (H)	Jutglà (2), Romero, Nilsson, Meijer, Skóraś	Seventh round	Tubize-Braine (III)	4–0 (A)	Dreyer (pen.), Dolberg (3)
Patro Eisden Maasmechelen (II)	3–1 (A)	Nielsen, Vanaken, Jashari	Eighth round	Westerlo (I)	4–1 (H)	Jørgensen, Dolberg (2), N'Diaye
OH Leuven (I)	3–0 (H)	Tzolis (2), Skóraś (pen.)	Quarter-finals	Beerschot (I)	1–0 (A)	Simić
Genk (I)	2–1 (H), 1–1 (A) (3–2 agg.)	Ordóñez, Tzolis (pen.); Ordóñez	Semi-finals	Antwerp (I)	1–0 (H); 2–2 (A) (3–2 agg.)	Degreef; Verschaeren, Dendoncker

== Pre-match ==
Going into the match, both clubs were looking to finally win the cup again after many years of struggling, Anderlecht winning last in 2008, Club Brugge in 2015, with that last final against Anderlecht ending dramatically with two goals at the very end.

Contrary to their shared drought in a cup, Club Brugge had been winning titles recently and had won 4 out of the last 5 league seasons, while Anderlecht had been without any trophy since 2017, putting more pressure on the Brussels' based club. On the other hand, Club Brugge was in a fierce battle for the title, with Union SG one point ahead with just three games to go, while Anderlecht was certain they would most likely finish fourth which would still grant them European football irrespective of the result of the cup final, and could focus nearly fully on the cup.

The winner of the match qualified for the 2025–26 UEFA Europa League play-off round, but due to the league standings going into the match this was of lesser importance: with Club Brugge certain of finishing top three (and most likely top two) they were looking to qualify for (the qualifying rounds of) the 2025–26 UEFA Champions League, which would mean the ticket for the UEFA Europa League play-off round would be passed along to the third-placed team in the league. With Anderlecht in fourth, eight points ahead of fifth place Antwerp with three league matches to go, this meant that most likely Anderlecht would either qualify for the play-off round (as winners) or second qualifying round (if loses).

== Match ==
=== Summary ===
In the first minute Ferran Jutglà missed a huge chance for Club Brugge after which the match dulled down: Anderlecht was waiting for Club Brugge to slip up and counter, but the latter also didn't show much, with both teams not fielding key players as Jan Vertonghen (Anderlecht) and Simon Mignolet (Club Brugge) were both on the bench not being 100% recovered after recent injuries to start the match. With thirty minutes played Thorgan Hazard showed eagerness but without concrete chances coming from it. Just before halftime, Hugo Siquet (who started the match only because Kyriani Sabbe got injured during the warming-up) was given too much space to deliver a perfect assist for Romeo Vermant at the far post as he tapped in the opening goal.

Five minutes into the second half, the ball hit Hans Vanaken's arm in the penalty area, but both referee Jasper Vergoote as well as the VAR did not deem it worth of a penalty kick. On the hour mark Club Brugge doubled their lead with their first chance of the second half, again Vermant scoring, now acting quicker than his opponent and on assist of Christos Tzolis. Anderlecht subbed in Vertonghen, had a chance to score the 2–1 but Hans Vanaken cleared off the line and ultimately did score the 2–1 only in minute 91 through Luis Vázquez after Samuel Edozie dribbled past three Club Brugge players in the penalty box. A second penalty appeal after that was also denied, keeping the score at 2–1, allowing Club Brugge to win its 12th Belgian Cup.

=== Details ===
4 May 2025
18:00 CEST

Club Brugge	2–1	Anderlecht
Vermant 40', 61'	Report	Vázquez 90+1'

King Baudouin Stadium, Brussels
Attendance: 40,861
Referee: Jasper Vergoote

Club Brugge	Anderlecht

GK	29	(Belgium) Nordin Jackers
RB	41	(Belgium) Hugo Siquet		(substituted off) 80'
CB	4	(Ecuador) Joel Ordóñez
CB	44	(Belgium) Brandon Mechele
LB	55	(Belgium) Maxim De Cuyper
CM	15	(Nigeria) Raphael Onyedika	(yellow card) 22'	(substituted off) 74'
CM	30	(Switzerland) Ardon Jashari
RW	8	(Greece) Christos Tzolis
AM	20	(Belgium) Hans Vanaken (c)		(substituted off) 74'
LW	9	(Spain) Ferran Jutglà	(yellow card) 82'	(substituted off) 86'
CF	17	(Belgium) Romeo Vermant	(yellow card) 67'	(substituted off) 74'
Substitutes:
GK	22	(Belgium) Simon Mignolet
GK	71	(Belgium) Axl De Corte
DF	2	(Argentina) Zaid Romero
DF	14	(Netherlands) Bjorn Meijer		(substituted on) 80'
DF	58	(Belgium) Jorne Spileers
MF	10	(Norway) Hugo Vetlesen		(substituted on) 74'
MF	27	(Denmark) Casper Nielsen		(substituted on) 86'
MF	62	(Belgium) Lynnt Audoor
FW	19	(Sweden) Gustaf Nilsson		(substituted on) 74'
FW	21	(Poland) Michał Skóraś
FW	68	(Morocco) Chemsdine Talbi		(substituted on) 74'
Manager:
(Belgium) Nicky Hayen

GK	26	(Belgium) Colin Coosemans (c)
CB	79	(Morocco) Ali Maamar	(substituted off) 68'
CB	3	(Denmark) Lucas Hey
CB	4	(Serbia) Jan-Carlo Simić
RWB	21	(Mexico) César Huerta	(substituted off) 67'
LWB	5	(Senegal) Moussa N'Diaye	(substituted off) 67'
RM	11	(Belgium) Thorgan Hazard
CM	32	(Belgium) Leander Dendoncker
CM	10	(Belgium) Yari Verschaeren	(substituted off) 83'
LM	27	(England) Samuel Edozie
CF	12	(Denmark) Kasper Dolberg
Substitutes:
GK	16	(Denmark) Mads Kikkenborg
DF	6	(Sweden) Ludwig Augustinsson
DF	14	(Belgium) Jan Vertonghen	(substituted on) 67'
DF	34	(Brazil) Adryelson
MF	17	(Belgium) Théo Leoni
MF	18	(Ghana) Majeed Ashimeru
MF	23	(Belgium) Mats Rits
MF	29	(Belgium) Mario Stroeykens	(substituted on) 68'
MF	74	(Belgium) Nathan De Cat
FW	19	(Ecuador) Nilson Angulo	(substituted on) 67'
FW	20	(Argentina) Luis Vázquez	(substituted on) 83'
FW	42	(Japan) Keisuke Gotō
Manager:
(Albania) Besnik Hasi (yellow card)

Match rules

- 90 minutes.
- 30 minutes of extra time if necessary.
- Penalty shoot-out if scores still level.
- Twelve named substitutes.
- Maximum of five substitutions.

== See also ==
- Clashes in Brussels on May 4 and 5, 2025
