= 2024–25 RSC Anderlecht season =

RSC Anderlecht
2024–25 season
- Chairman: Wouter Vandenhaute
- Manager: Brian Riemer (until 19 September); David Hubert (19 September–19 March); Besnik Hasi (from 20 March)
- Stadium: Constant Vanden Stock Stadium
- Belgian Pro League: 4th
- Champions' play-offs: 4th
- Belgian Cup: Runners-up
- UEFA Europa League: Knockout phase play-offs
- Top goalscorer: League: Kasper Dolberg (18); All: Kasper Dolberg (24)
- Highest home attendance: 18,731 vs Standard Liège
- Lowest home attendance: 14,802 vs OH Leuven
- Average home league attendance: 17,977
- Biggest win: Anderlecht 6–0 Gent
- Biggest defeat: Anderlecht 0–2 Genk
Home colours	Away colours	Third colours

The 2024–25 season was the 117th season in the history of the R.S.C. Anderlecht, and the club's 90th consecutive season in the Belgian Pro League. In addition to the domestic league, the team participated in the Belgian Cup and the UEFA Europa League.

== Players ==
=== First-team squad ===
As of 10 February 2025

Note: Flags indicate national team as defined under FIFA eligibility rules; some limited exceptions apply. Players may hold more than one non-FIFA nationality.

No.	Pos.	Nation	Player
3	DF	DEN	Lucas Hey
4	DF	SRB	Jan-Carlo Simić
5	DF	SEN	Moussa N'Diaye
6	DF	SWE	Ludwig Augustinsson
10	MF	BEL	Yari Verschaeren
11	FW	BEL	Thorgan Hazard
12	FW	DEN	Kasper Dolberg
14	DF	BEL	Jan Vertonghen (captain)
16	GK	DEN	Mads Kikkenborg
17	MF	BEL	Théo Leoni
18	MF	GHA	Majeed Ashimeru
19	FW	ECU	Nilson Angulo
20	FW	ARG	Luis Vázquez
21	MF	MEX	César Huerta

No.	Pos.	Nation	Player
22	FW	MAR	Elyess Dao
23	MF	BEL	Mats Rits
25	DF	BEL	Thomas Foket
26	GK	BEL	Colin Coosemans
27	MF	ENG	Samuel Edozie (on loan from Southampton)
29	MF	BEL	Mario Stroeykens
32	MF	BEL	Leander Dendoncker (on loan from Aston Villa)
34	DF	BRA	Adryelson (on loan from Lyon)
54	DF	BEL	Killian Sardella
55	DF	BEL	Marco Kana
62	FW	JPN	Keisuke Goto
63	MF	BEL	Timon Vanhoutte
72	MF	BEL	Nathan De Cat
83	MF	BEL	Tristan Degreef

== Transfers ==
=== In ===
Pos.	Player	Transferred from	Fee	Date	Source
MF	(Nigeria) Ishaq Abdulrazak	(Sweden) BK Häcken	Loan return	30 June 2024	
MF	(France) Alexis Flips	(Turkey) MKE Ankaragücü	Loan return	30 June 2024	
MF	(Belgium) Marco Kana	(Belgium) Kortrijk	Loan return	30 June 2024	
DF	(Serbia) Jan-Carlo Simić	(Italy) AC Milan	€3,000,000	23 July 2024	
DF	(Belgium) Thomas Foket	(France) Reims	Free	3 August 2024	
DF	(Sweden) Ludwig Augustinsson	(Spain) Sevilla	Undisclosed	6 August 2024	
DF	(Denmark) Mathias Jørgensen	(England) Brentford	Free	15 August 2024	
MF	(Belgium) Leander Dendoncker	(England) Aston Villa	Loan	31 August 2024	
MF	(England) Samuel Edozie	(England) Southampton	Loan	4 September 2024	
MF	(Nigeria) Ishaq Abdulrazak	(Norway) Odds BK	Loan return	31 December 2024	
MF	(Mexico) César Huerta	(Mexico) Pumas UNAM	€2,000,000	10 January 2025	
DF	(Brazil) Adryelson	(France) Olympique Lyonnais	Loan	15 January 2025	

=== Out ===
Pos.	Player	Transferred to	Fee	Date	Source
DF	(Sweden) Ludwig Augustinsson	(Spain) Sevilla	Loan return	30 June 2024	
DF	(Argentina) Federico Gattoni	(Spain) Sevilla	Loan return	30 June 2024	
MF	(Denmark) Thomas Delaney	(Spain) Sevilla	Loan return	30 June 2024	
DF	(Belgium) Zeno Debast	(Portugal) Sporting CP	€15,500,000	4 July 2024	
MF	(Belgium) Antoine Colassin	(Belgium) Beerschot	Undisclosed	30 August 2024	
MF	(Norway) Kristian Arnstad	(Denmark) AGF	€2,100,000	31 August 2024	
MF	(Nigeria) Ishaq Abdulrazak	(Norway) Odds BK	Loan	2 September 2024	
DF	(Belgium) Louis Patris	(Belgium) Sint-Truiden	Loan	4 September 2024	
MF	(France) Alexis Flips	(Belgium) Charleroi	Loan	6 September 2024	
DF	(Denmark) Mathias Jørgensen	(United States) LA Galaxy	Undisclosed	15 January 2025	

== Friendlies ==
=== Pre-season ===
26 June 2024 Friendly	Tubize (Belgium)	1–4	(Belgium) Anderlecht	Tubize
14:30	Hazard 90+4'	Report	Amuzu 5'; 10' (o.g.); Degreef 41'; Ure 67'	Stadium: Stade Edmond Luberton; Attendance: 4,000

29 June 2024 Friendly	Anderlecht (Belgium)	2–1	(Belgium) Dender	Neerpede
14:30	27' (pen.); Ure 41'		7' (o.g.)	Attendance: 0

6 July 2024 Friendly	PSV (Netherlands)	0–3	(Belgium) Anderlecht	Eindhoven
14:30	Oppegård (yellow card) 65'; Babadi (yellow card) 75'		Angulo 31'; Vázquez (penalty missed) 47', 47'; Degreef 85'	Stadium: De Herdgang

14 July 2024 Friendly	Braga (Portugal)	2–1	(Belgium) Anderlecht	Vila Nova de Famalicão, Portugal
11:00	Stroeykens 46' (o.g.); Martínez 78'		Amuzu 63'	Stadium: Estádio Municipal 22 de Junho

20 July 2024 Gala match	Anderlecht (Belgium)	2–1	(Germany) VfL Wolfsburg	Anderlecht
13:30	Dolberg 66'; Angulo 69'		Amoura 14'	Stadium: Lotto Park

21 July 2024 Friendly	Anderlecht (Belgium)	6–2	(France) Amiens	Anderlecht
11:00	Flips 11'; Ure 13', 40', 83'; Arnstad 45+2', 53'		(red card) 36'; 81'; 89' (pen.)	Attendance: 0

== Competitions ==
=== Overall record ===
Competition	First match	Last match	Starting round	Final position	Record							
Competition	First match	Last match	Starting round	Final position	Pld	W	D	L	GF	GA	GD	Win %
Belgian Pro League regular season	27 July 2024	16 March 2025	Matchday 1		30	15	6	9	50	27	+23	50.00
Champions' play-offs	30 March 2025	29 May 2025			3	0	0	3	1	6	−5	0.00
Belgian Cup	31 October 2024		Seventh round		4	4	0	0	10	1	+9	100.00
UEFA Europa League	22 August 2024	20 February 2025	Play-off round	Knockout phase play-offs	12	6	3	3	18	17	+1	50.00
Total					49	25	9	15	79	51	+28	51.02

Last updated: 12 April 2025
Source: Soccerway

=== Belgian Pro League ===
==== Regular season ====
Pos	Team	Pld	W	D	L	GF	GA	GD	Pts	Qualification or relegation
2	Club Brugge	30	17	8	5	65	36	+29	59	Qualification for the Champions' play-offs
3	Union SG	30	15	10	5	49	25	+24	55	Qualification for the Champions' play-offs
4	Anderlecht	30	15	6	9	50	27	+23	51	Qualification for the Champions' play-offs
5	Antwerp	30	12	10	8	47	32	+15	46	Qualification for the Champions' play-offs
6	Gent	30	11	12	7	41	33	+8	45	Qualification for the Champions' play-offs

Source: Jupiler Pro League (in Dutch), Soccerway
Rules for classification: 1) Points; 2) Matches won; 3) Goal difference; 4) Goals scored; 5) Away matches won; 6) Away goal difference; 7) Away goals scored; 8) Play-off.

==== Results summary ====
Overall								Home						Away					
Pld	W	D	L	GF	GA	GD	Pts	W	D	L	GF	GA	GD	W	D	L	GF	GA	GD
22	10	6	6	38	21	+17	36	5	3	3	21	12	+9	5	3	3	17	9	+8

Last updated: 19 January 2025.
Source: Worldfootball

==== Results by round ====
Round	1	2	3	4	5	6	7	8	9	10	11	12	13	14	15	16	17	18	19	20	21	22	23
Ground	H	A	H	A	H	A	H	H	A	H	A	A	H	A	H	A	H	A	A	H	H	A	H
Result	W	W	D	W	L	D	D	D	D	W	L	L	W	W	W	D	W	W	L	L	L	W	
Position	2	2	3	1	3	3	4	6	7	4	6	6	5	4	4	4	3	3	3	3	5	4	

Updated to match(es) played on 19 January 2025. Source: Worldfootball
A = Away; H = Home; W = Win; D = Draw; L = Loss

==== Matches ====
The match schedule was released on 11 June 2024.

27 July 2024 1	Anderlecht	1–0	Sint-Truiden	Anderlecht
20:45 UTC+2	Stroeykens 90+2'	Report		Stadium: Lotto Park; Attendance: 0 Referee: Jasper Vergoote
Note: The match was held behind closed doors as a result of a probationary sanction imposed due to unsportsmanlike behavior exhibited by fans from both teams during a match hosted by Standard in October 2022, as well as subsequent misconduct during a cup match against Standard last December.

4 August 2024 2	Antwerp	1–2	Anderlecht	Antwerp
13:30 UTC+2	Kerk 34'; Alderweireld (yellow card) 39'; Odoi (yellow card) 90+1'	Report	Lammens 25' (o.g.); Ashimeru 80'	Stadium: Bosuilstadion; Attendance: 16,114; Referee: Erik Lambrechts

10 August 2024 3	Anderlecht	1–1	OH Leuven	Anderlecht
20:45 UTC+2	Simić (yellow card) 26'; Dolberg 36'; Sardella (yellow card) 39'; Vázquez (yellow card) 86'	Report	Maertens 44'; Balikwisha (yellow card) 51'; Mendyl (yellow card) 62'	Stadium: Lotto Park; Attendance: 14,802; Referee: Lawrence Visser

17 August 2024 4	Mechelen	1–3	Anderlecht	Mechelen
20:45 UTC+2	Lauberbach 23'	Report	Augustinsson 42'; Amuzu 45+5'; Leoni 90'	Stadium: AFAS Stadion; Attendance: 13,988; Referee: Wesli De Cremer

1 September 2024 6	Union Saint-Gilloise	0–0	Anderlecht	Forest
18:30 UTC+2	Rodríguez (penalty missed) 22'; Terho (yellow card) 41'; Ait El Hadj (yellow card) 45+7'; Vanhoutte (yellow card) 90+5'	Report	Jørgensen (yellow card) 16'; Rits (yellow card) 36'; Simić (yellow card) 44'; Sardella (yellow card) 84'	Stadium: Joseph Marien Stadium; Attendance: 8,489; Referee: Nicolas Laforge

14 September 2024 7	Anderlecht	2–2	Westerlo	Anderlecht
20:45 UTC+2	Vázquez 9'; Stroeykens 84'	Report	Bayram 38'; Vušković 60'	Stadium: Lotto Park; Attendance: 15,408; Referee: Nathan Verboomen

17 September 2024 5	Anderlecht	0–2	Genk	Anderlecht
20:00 UTC+2		Report	Sadick 37'; Adedeji-Sternberg 86'	Stadium: Lotto Park; Attendance: 14,834; Referee: Erik Lambrechts
Note: The match originally scheduled for 23 August 2024 was postponed due to Anderlecht's participation in the Europa League.

21 September 2024 8	Anderlecht	0–0	Charleroi	Anderlecht
20:45 UTC+2		Report		Stadium: Lotto Park; Attendance: 16,841; Referee: Jasper Vergoote

28 September 2024 9	Dender	1–1	Anderlecht	Denderleeuw
20:45 UTC+2	Fila (yellow card) 46'; Scheidler 52'; Van Oudenhove (yellow card) 86'; Sylla (yellow card) 90+6'	Report	Edozie 28'; N'Diaye (yellow card) 82'; Degreef (yellow card) 88'	Stadium: Van Roystadion; Attendance: 6,122; Referee: Kevin Van Damme

6 October 2024 10	Anderlecht	3–0	Standard Liège	Anderlecht
13:30 UTC+2	Simić 9', (yellow card) 83'; Dolberg 30'; Dreyer 90+2'; Sardella (yellow card) 90+5'	Report	Hautekiet (yellow card) 54'	Stadium: Lotto Park; Attendance: 18,731; Referee: Lothar D'hondt

18 October 2024 11	Beerschot	2–1	Anderlecht	Antwerp
20:45 UTC+2	Al-Sahafi 30', 70', (yellow card) 90+2'; Dagba (yellow card) 48'; Plat (yellow card) 51'; Kosiah (yellow card) 86'	Report	Dolberg 50' (pen.)	Stadium: Olympisch Stadion; Attendance: 7,093; Referee: Simon Bourdeaud'hui

27 October 2024 12	Club Brugge	2–1	Anderlecht	Bruges
13:30 UTC+1	Vermant 8'; Talbi 76'	Report	Leoni (yellow card) 45+2'; Dendoncker (yellow card) 54'; Dolberg (yellow card) 55'; Simić 88'	Stadium: Jan Breydel Stadium; Attendance: 25,978; Referee: Jasper Vergoote

3 November 2024 13	Anderlecht	4–0	Kortrijk	Anderlecht
18:30 UTC+2	Dolberg 37' (pen.), 77'; Kadri 50' (o.g.); Stroeykens 57'	Report		Stadium: Lotto Park; Attendance: 16,620; Referee: Wim Smet

10 November 2024 14	Cercle Brugge	0–5	Anderlecht	Bruges
13:30 UTC+1	Diakité (red card) 82'; Delanghe (yellow card) 90'	Report	Dolberg 19', 62' (pen.), 75'; N'Diaye (yellow card) 27'; Verschaeren (yellow card) 54'; Leoni 72'; Stroeykens (yellow card) 83'; Vázquez 90'	Stadium: Jan Breydel Stadium; Attendance: 8,640; Referee: Wesli De Cremer

24 November 2024 15	Anderlecht	6–0	Gent	Anderlecht
18:30 UTC+1	Rits 23'; Edozie 38'; Dolberg 45+1', 77'; Tiago Araújo 85' (o.g.); Amuzu 88'	Report	Torunarigha (yellow card) 9' (yellow-red card) 43'; Watanabe (yellow card) 43'; Samoise (yellow card) 68' (red card) 75'	Stadium: Lotto Park; Attendance: 17,534; Referee: Lothar D'hondt

1 December 2024 16	OH Leuven	0–0	Anderlecht	Leuven
16:00 UTC+1	Vlietinck (yellow card) 39'; Schrijvers (yellow card) 59'	Report	Zanka (yellow card) 83'	Stadium: Den Dreef; Attendance: 8,021; Referee: Bram Van Driessche

8 December 2024 17	Anderlecht	2–1	Beerschot	Anderlecht
18:30 UTC+1	Verschaeren 45+7'; Dreyer 90+3'		Al-Sahafi 7'	Stadium: Lotto Park; Attendance: 16,773; Referee: Erik Lambrechts

15 December 2024 18	Sint-Truiden	0–2	Anderlecht	Sint-Truiden
18:30 UTC+1	Mbalanda (yellow card) 90+6'		Dolberg 27', 62' (pen.); N'Diaye (yellow card) 52'; Zanka (red card) 67'	Stadium: Stayen; Attendance: 8,576; Referee: Lothar D'hondt

22 December 2024 19	Genk	2–0	Anderlecht	Genk
13:30 UTC+1	Arokodare 29'; Karetsas 72'			Stadium: Cegeka Arena; Referee: Jan Boterberg

27 December 2024 20	Anderlecht	2–3	Dender	Anderlecht
20:45 UTC+1	Verschaeren 21'; Dreyer 30'		Květ 9'; Scheidler 77'; Nsimba 88'	Stadium: Lotto Park; Attendance: 17,250; Referee: Wim Smet

12 January 2025 21	Anderlecht	0–3	Club Brugge	Anderlecht
18:30 UTC+1	Rits (yellow card) 71'		Jutglà 10', 41'; Nilsson 79'	Stadium: Lotto Park; Attendance: 18,502; Referee: Jasper Vergoote

19 January 2025 22	Kortrijk	0–2	Anderlecht	Kortrijk
13:30 UTC+1	Silva (yellow card) 61' (yellow-red card) 64'; Ambrose (yellow card) 70'		Hazard 62', (yellow card) 66'; Degreef (yellow card) 89'; Huerta 90+3'	Stadium: Guldensporen Stadion; Referee: Lothar D'Hondt

26 January 2025 23	Anderlecht	4–1	Mechelen	Anderlecht
18:30 UTC+1				Stadium: Lotto Park

9 February 2025 25	Anderlecht	2–0	Antwerp

16 February 2025 26	Charleroi	0–1	Anderlecht

23 February 2025 27	Anderlecht	0–2	Union Saint-Gilloise

2 March 2025 28	Standard Liège	0–2	Anderlecht

9 March 2025 29	Westerlo	2–0	Anderlecht

16 March 2025 30	Anderlecht	3–0	Cercle Brugge

==== Champions' play-offs ====
Pos	Team	Pld	W	D	L	GF	GA	GD	Pts	Qualification or relegation
2	Club Brugge	10	7	2	1	21	6	+15	53	Qualification for the Champions League third qualifying round
3	Genk	10	4	1	5	14	11	+3	47	Qualification for the Europa League play-off round (Note: Club Brugge won the 2024–25 Belgian Cup and qualified for the Champions League through finishing second, the Europa League play-off round berth was therefore transferred to regular season winners Genk.)
4	Anderlecht	10	3	1	6	12	13	−1	36	Qualification for the Europa League second qualifying round
5	Antwerp	10	2	3	5	10	18	−8	32	Qualification for the European competition play-off
6	Gent	10	1	0	9	4	32	−28	26	

Source: Jupiler Pro League (in Dutch), Soccerway
Rules for classification: 1) Points; 2) Points without (possible) half points added due to rounding; 3) Regular season finishing position.
Notes:

30 March 2025 1	Club Brugge	2–0	Anderlecht	Bruges
13:30				Referee: Jasper Vergoote

6 April 2025 2	Anderlecht	1–2	Genk	Anderlecht
18:30				Stadium: Lotto Park; Referee: Erik Lambrechts

12 April 2025 3	Union Saint-Gilloise	2–0	Anderlecht	Forest
20:45				Stadium: Joseph Marien Stadium; Referee: Lothar D'hondt

=== Belgian Cup ===
31 October 2024 Seventh round	Tubize	0–4	Anderlecht	Tubize
20:30 UTC+1	De Bolle (yellow card) 24'; Garlito (yellow card) 51'		Foket (yellow card) 14'; Dreyer 26' (pen.); Degreef (yellow card) 32'; Dolberg 65', 66', 86'; Lapage (yellow card) 88'	Stadium: Stade Leburton; Referee: Anthony Letellier

5 December 2024 Round of 16	Anderlecht	4–1	Westerlo	Anderlecht
20:30 UTC+1	Zanka 11', (yellow card) 60'; Dolberg 32', 56'; Degreef (yellow card) 35'; N'Diaye 43'		Van den Keybus 8', (yellow card) 45+2'	Stadium: Lotto Park; Referee: Jasper Vergoote

9 January 2025 Quarter-finals	Beerschot	0–1	Anderlecht	Antwerp
20:30 UTC+1	Konstantopoulos (yellow card) 19'; Mbe Soh (yellow card) 45'; Verlinden (yellow card) 85'; Plat (yellow card) 90+5'		Simić 2'; Rits (yellow card) 21'; Amuzu (yellow card) 84'	Stadium: Olympisch Stadion; Referee: Bram Van Driessche

16 January 2025 Semi-finals; First leg	Anderlecht	1–0	Antwerp	Anderlecht
20:45 UTC+1	Simić (yellow card) 4'; Adryelson (yellow card) 4'; Degreef 30'		Janssen (yellow card) 4'; Doumbia (yellow card) 39'; Deman (yellow card) 70'; Odoi (yellow card) 74'	Stadium: Lotto Park; Referee: Nathan Verboomen

6 February 2025 Semi-finals; Second leg	Antwerp	2–2 (2–3 agg.)	Anderlecht	Antwerp
20:45 UTC+1	Odoi (yellow card) 21' (yellow-red card) 37', (goal) 26'; Kerk 85'		Verschaeren 32'; Dendoncker 90+1'	Stadium: Bosuilstadion; Referee: Jasper Vergote

4 May 2025 Final	Club Brugge	v	Anderlecht	Antwerp
18:00 UTC+1				Stadium: Bosuilstadion

=== UEFA Europa League ===
==== Play-off round ====
22 August 2024 First leg	Dinamo Minsk (Belarus)	0–1	(Belgium) Anderlecht	Mezőkövesd, Hungary
20:45 UTC+2		Report	Augustinsson 9'	Stadium: Mezőkövesdi Városi Stadion; Attendance: 0 Referee: Rohit Saggi (Norway)

29 August 2024 Second leg	Anderlecht (Belgium)	1–0 (2–0 agg.)	(Belarus) Dinamo Minsk	Anderlecht
20:00 UTC+2	Verschaeren (yellow card) 62'; Amuzu 83'	Report	Selyava (yellow card) 47'	Stadium: Lotto Park; Attendance: 17,102; Referee: Nikola Dabanović (Montenegro)

==== League phase ====
The draw for the league phase was held on 29 August 2024.

Pos	Team	Pld	W	D	L	GF	GA	GD	Pts	Qualification
8	(Scottish Football Association) Rangers	8	4	2	2	16	10	+6	14	Advance to round of 16 (seeded)
9	(Norwegian Football Federation) Bodø/Glimt	8	4	2	2	14	11	+3	14	Advance to knockout phase play-offs (seeded)
10	(Royal Belgian Football Association) Anderlecht	8	4	2	2	14	12	+2	14	Advance to knockout phase play-offs (seeded)
11	(Romanian Football Federation) FCSB	8	4	2	2	10	9	+1	14	Advance to knockout phase play-offs (seeded)
12	(Royal Dutch Football Association) Ajax	8	4	1	3	16	8	+8	13	Advance to knockout phase play-offs (seeded)

Source: UEFA
Rules for classification: League phase tiebreakers

Round	1	2	3	4	5	6	7	8
Ground	H	A	H	A	H	A	A	H
Result	W	W	W	D	D	W	L	L
Position	11	5	3	5	5	3	7	10

Source: UEFA
A = Away; H = Home; W = Win; D = Draw; L = Loss

25 September 2024 1	Anderlecht (Belgium)	2–1	(Hungary) Ferencváros	Anderlecht
21:00 UTC+2	Dolberg (yellow card) 42', (goal) 66' (pen.); Verschaeren 60'; Angulo (yellow card) 78' (yellow-red card) 81'; Ashimeru (yellow card) 90+5'	Report	Cissé (yellow card) 19'; Zachariassen (yellow card) 32'; Botka (yellow card) 73'; Traoré 86'; Ćivić (yellow card) 90+3'; Varga (yellow card) 90+5'	Stadium: Lotto Park; Attendance: 15,417; Referee: Julian Weinberger (Austria)

3 October 2024 2	Real Sociedad (Spain)	1–2	(Belgium) Anderlecht	San Sebastián, Spain
18:45 UTC+2	Marín 5'; Óskarsson (yellow card) 52'	Report	Vázquez 28'; Leoni 39'; Rits (yellow card) 45+1'; Foket (yellow card) 61'	Stadium: Anoeta Stadium; Attendance: 30,985; Referee: Marian Barbu (Romania)

24 October 2024 3	Anderlecht (Belgium)	2–0	(Bulgaria) Ludogorets Razgrad	Anderlecht
21:00 UTC+2	Degreef (yellow card) 28'; Edozie 67'; Foket (yellow card) 80'; Sardella (yellow card) 89'; Dreyer 90+4'	Report	Vidal (red card) 30'; Verdon (yellow card) 41'; Chochev (yellow card) 45+3'; Naressi (yellow card) 45+4'; Rick (yellow card) 45+5'; Bonmann (yellow card) 64'; Padt (yellow card) 90+7'	Stadium: Lotto Park; Attendance: 18,000; Referee: Filip Glova (Slovakia)

7 November 2024 4	RFS (Latvia)	1–1	(Belgium) Anderlecht	Riga, Latvia
22:00 UTC+2	N'Diaye 90+6' (o.g.)	Report	Stroeykens 85'	Stadium: Daugava Stadium; Attendance: 4,820; Referee: Aleksandar Stavrev (North Macedonia)

28 November 2024 5	Anderlecht (Belgium)	2–2	(Portugal) Porto	Anderlecht
18:45 UTC+1	N'Diaye (yellow card) 29'; Degreef 52'; Amuzu 86'	Report	Galeno 24' (pen.); Mário (yellow card) 34'; Nico (yellow card) 44'; Vieira 83'	Stadium: Lotto Park; Attendance: 17,717; Referee: Morten Krogh (Denmark)

12 December 2024 6	Slavia Prague (Czech Republic)	1–2	(Belgium) Anderlecht	Prague, Czech Republic
21:00 UTC+1	Chorý 58'		Angulo 8'; Verschaeren 31'	Stadium: Fortuna Arena; Referee: Anastasios Papapetrou (Greece)

23 January 2025 7	Viktoria Plzeň (Czech Republic)	2–0	(Belgium) Anderlecht	Plzeň, Czech Republic
18:45 UTC+1				Stadium: Doosan Arena

30 January 2025 8	Anderlecht (Belgium)	3–4	(Germany) TSG Hoffenheim	Anderlecht
21:00 UTC+1	Vázquez 18'; Goto 79'; Augustinsson 88'		Hranac 41'; Bischof 54'; Mokwa 59'; Hlozek 65'	Stadium: Lotto Park

==== Knockout phase play-offs ====
13 February 2025 First leg	Fenerbahçe (Turkey)	3–0	(Belgium) Anderlecht	Istanbul, Turkey
20:45 UTC+3				Stadium: Şükrü Saracoğlu Stadium

20 February 2025 Second leg	Anderlecht (Belgium)	2–2 (2–5 agg.)	(Turkey) Fenerbahçe	Anderlecht
21:00 UTC+1				Stadium: Constant Vanden Stock Stadium

== Statistics ==
=== Appearances and goals ===
No.	Pos	Nat	Player	Total		Pro League		Belgian Cup		UEFA Europa League	
No.	Pos	Nat	Player	Apps	Goals	Apps	Goals	Apps	Goals	Apps	Goals
Goalkeepers
16	GK	(Denmark) DEN	Mads Kikkenborg	0	0	0	0	0	0	0	0
26	GK	(Belgium) BEL	Colin Coosemans	10	0	8	0	0	0	2	0
35	GK	(Germany) GER	Timo Schlieck	0	0	0	0	0	0	0	0
63	GK	(Belgium) BEL	Timon Vanhoutte	0	0	0	0	0	0	0	0
Defenders
4	DF	(Serbia) SRB	Jan-Carlo Simić	9	0	6+1	0	0	0	2	0
5	DF	(Senegal) SEN	Moussa N'Diaye	5	0	4	0	0	0	0+1	0
6	DF	(Sweden) SWE	Ludwig Augustinsson	7	2	4+1	1	0	0	2	1
13	DF	(Denmark) DEN	Mathias Jørgensen	7	0	5	0	0	0	2	0
14	DF	(Belgium) BEL	Jan Vertonghen	2	0	2	0	0	0	0	0
25	DF	(Belgium) BEL	Thomas Foket	5	0	1+3	0	0	0	0+1	0
54	DF	(Belgium) BEL	Killian Sardella	10	0	7+1	0	0	0	1+1	0
55	DF	(Belgium) BEL	Marco Kana	0	0	0	0	0	0	0	0
71	DF	(Belgium) BEL	Nunzio Engwanda	0	0	0	0	0	0	0	0
73	DF	(Belgium) BEL	Amando Lapage	0	0	0	0	0	0	0	0
Midfielders
7	MF	(Belgium) BEL	Francis Amuzu	7	2	3+3	1	0	0	0+1	1
10	MF	(Belgium) BEL	Yari Verschaeren	10	0	6+2	0	0	0	1+1	0
11	MF	(Belgium) BEL	Thorgan Hazard	0	0	0	0	0	0	0	0
17	MF	(Belgium) BEL	Théo Leoni	10	1	7+1	1	0	0	1+1	0
18	MF	(Ghana) GHA	Majeed Ashimeru	7	1	2+4	1	0	0	0+1	0
21	MF	(Guinea) GUI	Amadou Diawara	0	0	0	0	0	0	0	0
23	MF	(Belgium) BEL	Mats Rits	9	0	7	0	0	0	2	0
27	MF	(England) ENG	Samuel Edozie	3	0	2+1	0	0	0	0	0
29	MF	(Belgium) BEL	Mario Stroeykens	10	2	5+3	2	0	0	2	0
32	MF	(Belgium) BEL	Leander Dendoncker	3	0	3	0	0	0	0	0
36	MF	(Denmark) DEN	Anders Dreyer	8	0	6	0	0	0	2	0
74	MF	(Belgium) BEL	Nathan De Cat	0	0	0	0	0	0	0	0
78	MF	(Morocco) MAR	Anas Tajaouart	0	0	0	0	0	0	0	0
80	MF	(United States) USA	Devon De Corte	0	0	0	0	0	0	0	0
83	MF	(Belgium) BEL	Tristan Degreef	2	0	0+1	0	0	0	0+1	0
Forwards
12	FW	(Denmark) DEN	Kasper Dolberg	9	1	7	1	0	0	1+1	0
19	FW	(Ecuador) ECU	Nilson Angulo	9	0	2+5	0	0	0	2	0
20	FW	(Argentina) ARG	Luis Vázquez	9	1	1+6	1	0	0	1+1	0
90	FW	(Scotland) SCO	Robbie Ure	0	0	0	0	0	0	0	0
Players transferred out during the season
8	MF	(France) FRA	Alexis Flips	1	0	0+1	0	0	0	0	0
22	DF	(Belgium) BEL	Louis Patris	1	0	0+1	0	0	0	0	0
61	MF	(Norway) NOR	Kristian Arnstad	0	0	0	0	0	0	0	0

Last updated: 22 September 2024
Source: Competitions

=== Goalscorers ===
As of match played 19 January 2025

Rank	Pos.	No.	Nat.	Player	Pro League	Play-offs	Belgian Cup	Europa League	Total
1	FW	12	(Denmark)	Kasper Dolberg	12	0	5	1	18
2	FW	36	(Denmark)	Anders Dreyer	3	0	1	1	5
3	FW	7	(Belgium)	Francis Amuzu	2	0	0	2	4
3	MF	29	(Belgium)	Mario Stroeykens	3	0	0	1	4
3	MF	10	(Belgium)	Yari Verschaeren	2	0	0	2	4
6	MF	27	(England)	Samuel Edozie	2	0	0	1	3
6	MF	17	(Belgium)	Théo Leoni	2	0	0	1	3
6	DF	4	(Serbia)	Jan-Carlo Simić	2	0	1	0	3
6	FW	20	(Argentina)	Luis Vázquez	2	0	0	1	3
10	DF	6	(Sweden)	Ludwig Augustinsson	1	0	0	1	2
10	MF	83	(Belgium)	Tristan Degreef	0	0	1	1	2
12	FW	19	(Ecuador)	Nilson Angulo	0	0	0	1	1
12	MF	18	(Ghana)	Majeed Ashimeru	1	0	0	0	1
12	MF	11	(Belgium)	Thorgan Hazard	1	0	0	0	1
12	MF	21	(Mexico)	César Huerta	1	0	0	0	1
12	DF	5	(Senegal)	Moussa N'Diaye	0	0	1	0	1
12	MF	23	(Belgium)	Mats Rits	1	0	0	0	1
12	DF	13	(Denmark)	Zanka	0	0	1	0	1
Own goals					3	0	0	0	3
Totals					38	0	10	13	61
