= 2026–27 RSC Anderlecht season =

RSC Anderlecht
2026–27 season
- Chairman: Michael Verschueren
- Manager: Vítor Bruno
- Stadium: Lotto Park
Home colours	Away colours

The 2026–27 season is the 119th season in the history of RSC Anderlecht, and the club's 92nd consecutive season in the Belgian Pro League. In addition to the domestic league, the club is participating in the Belgian Cup and the UEFA Europa League.

== Season summary ==
On 17 June 2026, the club's pre-season friendlies were announced.

On 23 June 2026, the club appointed Vítor Bruno as the new head coach of the club.

== Players ==
=== Current squad ===
As of 4 September 2026

Note: Flags indicate national team as defined under FIFA eligibility rules; some limited exceptions apply. Players may hold more than one non-FIFA nationality.

No.	Pos.	Nation	Player
2	DF	GER	Zoumana Keita
3	DF	DEN	Lucas Hey
4	DF	FRA	Giulian Biancone
5	DF	MDA	Oleg Reabciuk
6	DF	SWE	Ludwig Augustinsson
7	DF	SEN	Ilay Camara
8	MF	CIV	Romeo Amane
9	FW	SRB	Mihajlo Cvetković
10	FW	GER	Marten Winkler
11	FW	FIN	Oliver Antman
12	DF	IRL	Andrew Omobamidele (on loan from Strasbourg)
14	FW	UKR	Danylo Sikan
18	MF	CZE	Lukáš Ambros
19	MF	NOR	Thelo Aasgaard (on loan from Rangers)
21	FW	MAR	Tawfik Bentayeb
24	MF	NED	Enric Llansana
26	GK	BEL	Colin Coosemans (captain)

No.	Pos.	Nation	Player
27	DF	FRA	Léo Pétrot
29	MF	COD	Mario Stroeykens
30	MF	GRE	Ilias Koutsoupias
32	GK	GER	Justin Heekeren
33	GK	BEL	Mattis Seghers
49	FW	BEL	Jayden Onia Seke
50	DF	BEL	Kaïs Barry
53	FW	BEL	Noa Ojea
54	DF	BEL	Killian Sardella
55	MF	BEL	Marco Kana
61	FW	BEL	Joshua Nga Kana
62	DF	BEL	Basile Vroninks
66	GK	BEL	Michiel Haentjens
68	MF	BEL	Noah Kalonji
79	DF	MAR	Ali Maamar
83	FW	BEL	Tristan Degreef
91	FW	BEL	Adriano Bertaccini

=== Out on loan ===
Note: Flags indicate national team as defined under FIFA eligibility rules; some limited exceptions apply. Players may hold more than one non-FIFA nationality.

No.	Pos.	Nation	Player
99	FW	MLI	Ibrahim Kanaté (at 1. FC Kaiserslautern until 30 June 2027)

== Transfers ==
=== Transfers in ===
Date	Position	Nationality	Player	From	Ref.
19 June 2026	DF	(France)	Giulian Biancone	(Greece) Olympiacos	
2 July 2026	DF	(France)	Léo Pétrot	Free agent	
10 July 2026	MF	(Czech Republic)	Lukáš Ambros	(Poland) Górnik Zabrze	
29 July 2026	MF	(Finland)	Oliver Antman	(Scotland) Rangers F.C.	
17 August 2026	FW	(Germany)	Marten Winkler	(Germany) Hertha BSC	
21 August 2026	MF	(Morocco)	Tawfik Bentayeb	(Morocco) UTS Rabat	
1 September 2026	DF	(Moldova)	Oleg Reabciuk	Free agent	

=== Transfers out ===
Date	Position	Nationality	Player	To	Ref.
11 June 2026	FW	(Japan)	Keisuke Gotō	(Germany) SC Freiburg	
10 July 2026	MF	(Belgium)	Nathan De Cat	(Germany) TSG Hoffenheim	
14 July 2026	MF	(Belgium)	Thorgan Hazard	(France) Lens	
28 July 2026	MF	(Argentina)	Luis Vázquez	(England) Birmingham City	
12 August 2026	MF	(Belgium)	Yari Verschaeren	(Italy) Sampdoria	
25 August 2026	MF	(Canada)	Nathan Saliba	(Spain) Villarreal	
27 August 2026	FW	(Mexico)	César Huerta	(Mexico) Pumas UNAM	
27 August 2026	MF	(Belgium)	Mats Rits	(Belgium) K Beerschot VA	
31 August 2026	MF	(Netherlands)	Cedric Hatenboer	(Netherlands) Sparta Rotterdam	
10 September 2026	MF	(Serbia)	Jan-Carlo Simić	(Saudi Arabia) Al-Ittihad	

=== Loans in ===
Date	Position	Nationality	Player	From	Ref.
2 September 2026	MF	(Norway)	Thelo Aasgaard	(Scotland) Rangers	
2 September 2026	DF	(Republic of Ireland)	Andrew Omobamidele	(France) Strasbourg	

=== Loans out ===
Date	Position	Nationality	Player	To	Ref.
24 June 2026	MF	(Mali)	Ibrahim Kanaté	(Germany) 1. FC Kaiserslautern	
17 July 2026	MF	(Morocco)	Anas Tajaouart	(Belgium) RAAL La Louvière	
1 September 2026	DF	(Senegal)	Moussa N'Diaye	(Germany) Werder Bremen	

== Friendlies ==
4 July 2026 Friendly	Anderlecht	0–0	US Boulogne
		Report

11 July 2026 Friendly	Anderlecht	3–2	NEC Nijmegen
	Sikan 4'; Seke 48'; Llansana 88'	Report	Sano 17'; Chery 18'

== Competitions ==
=== Belgian Pro League ===
==== Regular season ====
Pos	Team	Pld	W	D	L	GF	GA	GD	Pts	Qualification or relegation
3	Union SG	10	8	2	0	29	7	+22	26	Qualification for the Europa League second qualifying round
4	Gent	10	8	1	1	19	6	+13	25	Qualification for the Conference League second qualifying round
5	Anderlecht	10	6	1	3	13	11	+2	19	
6	Lommel	11	4	4	3	15	13	+2	16	
7	Genk	10	4	3	3	18	14	+4	15	

Updated to match(es) played on 7 November 2026. Source: Jupiler Pro League (in Dutch)
Rules for classification: 1) Points; 2) Matches won; 3) Goal difference; 4) Goals scored; 5) Away matches won; 6) Away goal difference; 7) Away goals scored; 8) Play-off.

==== Matches ====
The league schedule was released on 18 June 2026.

9 August 2026 1	Anderlecht	2–1	RAAL La Louvière	Constant Vanden Stock Stadium
	Nga Kana 69'; Bertaccini 90+2'	Report	Ito (yellow card) 52' (red card) 59'; Isah 54'	Attendance: 16,083; Referee: Lawrence Visser

16 August 2026 2	SK Beveren	1–0	Anderlecht	Freethiel Stadion
	Gomis 14'	Report		Attendance: 5,804; Referee: Nathan Verboomen

30 August 2026 3	Union Saint-Gilloise	3–0	Anderlecht	Brussels
18:30 CEST	Sylla (yellow card) 29'; Zeneli 38'; Biondic 45'; Mac Allister (yellow card) 78'; Florucz 81'	Report	(yellow card) HT Biancone; (yellow card) 62' Kana	Stadium: Joseph Marien Stadium; Referee: Lawrence Visser

3 September 2026 4	Anderlecht	1–0	KV Kortrijk	Constant Vanden Stock Stadium
	Sikan 43'	Report		Attendance: 13,751; Referee: Bert Put

6 September 2026 5	Anderlecht	0–0	Genk	Constant Vanden Stock Stadium
		Report		Attendance: 16,572; Referee: Jan Boterberg

11 September 2026 6	Mechelen	0–1	Anderlecht	Achter de Kazerne
		Report	Bentayeb 43'	Attendance: 15,004; Referee: Erik Lambrechts

19 September 2026 7	Anderlecht	3–0	Zulte Waregem	Constant Vanden Stock Stadium
	Bentayeb 40'; Winkler 48', 54'	Report		Attendance: 15,040; Referee: Simon Bourdeaud'hui

10 October 2026 8	Cercle Brugge	1–2	Anderlecht	Jan Breydel Stadium
	Manneh 11'	Report	Bentayeb 86'; Bertaccini 90+3'	Attendance: 6,146; Referee: Kevin Van Damme

25 October 2026 9	Gent	4–0	Anderlecht	Planet Group Arena
	Kadri 14'; Cissé 72'; Sonko 77'; Volckaert 81'	Report		Referee: Erik Lambrechts

31 October 2026 10	Anderlecht	4–1	KVC Westerlo	Constant Vanden Stock Stadium
	Cvetković 40'; Stroeykens 43'; Aasgaard 45+1'; Ambros 60'	Report	Storm 81'	Referee: Nicolas Laforge

8 November 2026 11	Club Brugge	1–1	Anderlecht	Jan Breydel Stadium
	Vanaken 41'	Report	Cvetković 58'	Referee: Jasper Vergoote

22 November 2026 12	Anderlecht	v	OH Leuven
		Report

29 November 2026 13	Antwerp	v	Anderlecht
		Report

13 December 2026 14	Anderlecht	v	Charleroi
		Report

20 December 2026 15	Standard Liège	v	Anderlecht
		Report

27 December 2026 16	Anderlecht	v	Sint-Truidense VV
		Report

16 January 2027 17	Lommel	v	Anderlecht
		Report

23 January 2027 18	KV Kortrijk	v	Anderlecht
		Report

30 January 2027 19	Anderlecht	v	KAA Gent
		Report

6 February 2027 20	OH Leuven	v	Anderlecht
		Report

13 February 2027 21	Anderlecht	v	KV Mechelen
		Report

20 February 2027 22	SV Zulte Waregem	v	Anderlecht
		Report

27 February 2027 23	Anderlecht	v	Club Brugge
		Report

6 March 2027 24	KVC Westerlo	v	Anderlecht
		Report

13 March 2027 25	Anderlecht	v	Lommel SK
		Report

20 March 2027 26	Anderlecht	v	Standard Liège
		Report

3 April 2027 27	Genk	v	Anderlecht
		Report

10 April 2027 28	Anderlecht	v	SK Beveren
		Report

17 April 2027 29	Royal Charleroi SC	v	Anderlecht
		Report

24 April 2027 30	Cercle Brugge	v	Anderlecht
		Report

1 May 2027 31	Sint-Truidense VV	v	Anderlecht
		Report

8 May 2027 32	Royale Union Saint-Gilloise	v	Anderlecht
		Report

15 May 2027 33	Anderlecht	v	Antwerp
		Report

22 May 2027 34	RAAL La Louvière	v	Anderlecht
		Report

=== Belgian Cup ===
18 October 2026	Beerschot	2–1	Anderlecht	Antwerp
18:00 CEST	Haj Mohamed 22', 72'	Report	Bertaccini 86'	Stadium: Olympisch Stadion

=== UEFA Europa League ===
Pos	Team	Pld	W	D	L	GF	GA	GD	Pts	Qualification
13	(France) Lyon	4	2	1	1	6	7	−1	7	Advance to knockout phase play-offs (seeded)
14	(Netherlands) AZ	4	2	0	2	7	4	+3	6	Advance to knockout phase play-offs (seeded)
15	(Belgium) Anderlecht	4	2	0	2	6	3	+3	6	Advance to knockout phase play-offs (seeded)
16	(Greece) OFI	4	2	0	2	5	4	+1	6	Advance to knockout phase play-offs (seeded)
17	(France) Rennes	4	1	3	0	4	3	+1	6	Advance to knockout phase play-offs (unseeded)

Updated to match(es) played on 5 November 2026. Source: UEFA
Rules for classification: League phase tiebreakers

==== Qualifying rounds ====
23 July 2026	Hammarby IF (Sweden)	1–1	(Belgium) Anderlecht	3Arena, Stockholm
19:00	Adjei 89'	Report	Sikan 6'	Attendance: 23,572; Referee: Don Robertson (Scotland)

30 July 2026	Anderlecht (Belgium)	3–1	(Sweden) Hammarby IF	Constant Vanden Stock Stadium, Brussels
20:30	Sikan 47'; Cvetković 81'; Degreef 89'	Report	Abraham 2'	Attendance: 18,095; Referee: Danilo Nikolić (Serbia)

6 August 2026	PAOK (Greece)	0–1	(Belgium) Anderlecht	Toumba Stadium, Thessaloniki
19:45 (20:45 UTC+3)		Report	Cvetković 1'	Attendance: 19,161; Referee: Juan Martínez Munuera (Spain)

13 August 2026	Anderlecht (Belgium)	3–2	(Greece) PAOK	Constant Vanden Stock Stadium, Brussels
20:30	Pétrot 20'; Ambros 47'; Sikan 55'	Report	Živković 34'; Jeremejeff 88' (pen.)	Attendance: 17,976; Referee: Simone Sozza (Italy)

20 August 2026	Kairat (Kazakhstan)	0–3	(Belgium) Anderlecht	Central Stadium, Almaty
17:00 (20:00 UTC+5)		Report	Oksanen 2' (o.g.); Ambros 24'; Sikan 45+1'	Attendance: 17,563; Referee: Chris Kavanagh (England)

27 August 2026	Anderlecht (Belgium)	3–0	(Kazakhstan) Kairat	Constant Vanden Stock Stadium, Brussels
20:30	Cvetković 45+2' (pen.); Sikan 54'; Biancone 71'	Report		Attendance: 16,861; Referee: Espen Eskås (Norway)

==== League phase ====
16 September 2026	Anderlecht (Belgium)	1–2	(France) Lyon	Constant Vanden Stock Stadium, Brussels
21:00	Cvetković 61'	Report	Nartey 8'; Nakamura 22'	Attendance: 16,337; Referee: Ricardo de Burgos Bengoetxea (Spain)

15 October 2026	Dinamo Zagreb (Croatia)	1–0	(Belgium) Anderlecht	Maksimir Stadium, Zagreb
21:00	Beljo 90+6' (pen.)	Report		Attendance: 12,279; Referee: Orel Grinfeld (Israel)

22 October 2026	Jagiellonia Białystok (Poland)	0–3	(Belgium) Anderlecht	Stadion Miejski, Białystok
21:00		Report	Cvetković 22'; Winkler 72'; Onia Seke 80'	Attendance: 15,621; Referee: Ondřej Berka (Czech Republic)

5 November 2026	Anderlecht (Belgium)	2–0	(Austria) Red Bull Salzburg	Constant Vanden Stock Stadium, Brussels
18:45	Augustinsson 20'; Stroeykens (yellow card) 28'; Maamar (yellow card) 78'; Pétrot (yellow card) 83'; Winkler 90', (yellow card) 90+6'	Report	Baidoo (yellow card) 35'; Tabaković (yellow card) 45'; Zabransky (yellow card) 66'	Referee: Elchin Masiyev (Azerbaijan)

26 November 2026	OFI (Greece)	v	(Belgium) Anderlecht	Pankritio Stadium, Heraklion
21:00 (22:00 UTC+2)		Report

10 December 2026	Anderlecht (Belgium)	v	(Germany) TSG Hoffenheim	Constant Vanden Stock Stadium, Brussels
18:45		Report

21 January 2027	Anderlecht (Belgium)	v	(England) Sunderland	Constant Vanden Stock Stadium, Brussels
21:00		Report

28 January 2027	Marseille (France)	v	(Belgium) Anderlecht	Stade Vélodrome, Marseille
21:00		Report
