= Zoumana Keita =

German-Malian footballer (born 2005)

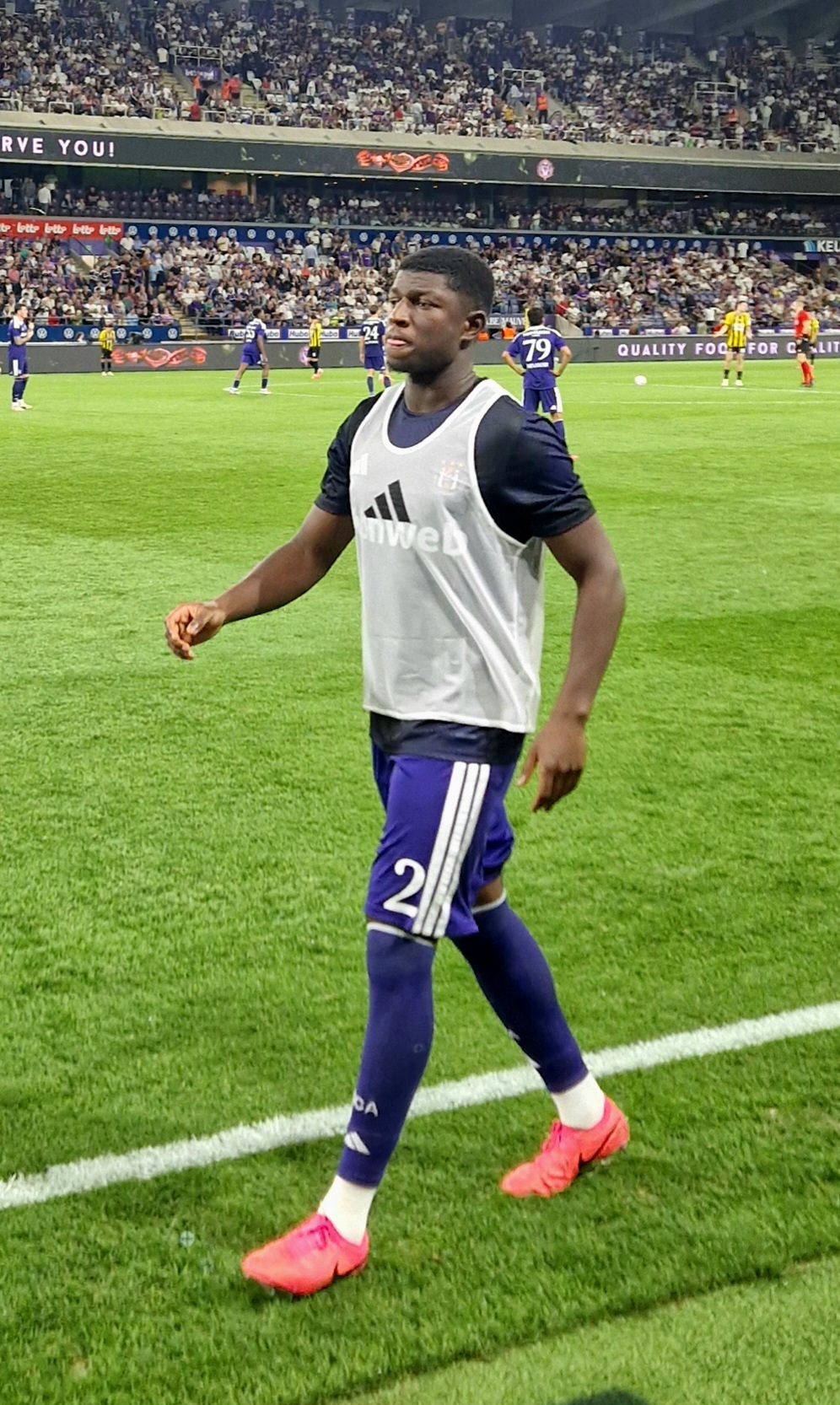
- Zoumana Keita for RSC Anderlecht in 2026

Personal information
- Date of birth: 16 November 2005 (age 20)
- Place of birth: Cologne, Germany
- Height: 1.89 m (6 ft 2 in)
- Position: Centre-back

Team information
- Current team: Anderlecht
- Number: 2

Youth career
- 1. FC Köln
- –2020: Viktoria Köln

Senior career*
Years	Team	Apps	(Gls)
2024–2025	Viktoria Köln	10	(0)
2025–	Anderlecht	0	(0)
2025–2026	RSCA Futures	14	(0)
- * Club domestic league appearances and goals as of 16 August 2026

Zoumana Keita (born 16 November 2005) is a professional footballer who plays as a centre-back for Belgian Pro League club Anderlecht. Born in Germany, he is of Malian descent and is eligible to represent both Germany and Mali internationally.

== Club career ==
=== Youth career ===
Keita began his football development in the youth academy of 1. FC Köln before moving to Viktoria Köln in his teenage years. At Viktoria, he progressed through the youth ranks and later transitioned into senior football within the club structure.

=== Senior career ===
Keita made his senior breakthrough with Viktoria Köln, where he gained experience in the German football system, including appearances in the 3. Liga. His performances at youth and senior level attracted interest from abroad.

On 3 June 2025, Keita signed for Belgian club Anderlecht on a long-term contract running until 2029. The club described him as a physically strong and quick central defender with significant development potential. However his debut was delayed due to an injury sustained in a training.

Following his arrival, he was assigned to RSCA Futures, Anderlecht's reserve team competing in the Challenger Pro League, as part of his development pathway into the first team.

== International career ==
Keita is eligible to represent both Germany and Mali due to his birthplace and heritage. As of May 2026, he has not yet made a senior international appearance for either nation.

== Style of play ==
Keita is a right-footed centre-back known for his pace, physical strength, and defensive awareness. He is primarily deployed in a back four and is considered a high-potential defensive prospect within the Anderlecht system.

== Career statistics ==
As of match played 30 July 2026

Appearances and goals by club, season and competition
Club	Season	League			Cup		Europe		Other		Total	
Club	Season	Division	Apps	Goals	Apps	Goals	Apps	Goals	Apps	Goals	Apps	Goals
Viktoria Köln	2023–24	3. Liga	0	0	0	0	—		1 (Note: Appearances in Middle Rhine Cup)	0	1	0
Viktoria Köln	2024–25	3. Liga	10	0	—		—		3	0	13	0
Viktoria Köln	Total		10	0	0	0	—		4	0	14	0
RSC Anderlecht	2025–26	Belgian Pro League	0	0	0	0	—		—		0	0
RSC Anderlecht	2026–27	Belgian Pro League	0	0	0	0	2 (Note: Appearances in UEFA Europa League)	0	—		2	0
RSC Anderlecht	Total		0	0	0	0	2	0	—		2	0
RSCA Futures	2025–26	Challenger Pro League	14	0	—		—		—		14	0
Career total			24	0	0	0	2	0	4	0	30	0
