= Joshua Nga Kana =

Belgian footballer (born 2009)

- Nga Kana in 2026

Personal information
- Full name: Joshua-Williame Nga Kana
- Date of birth: 13 June 2009 (age 17)
- Positions: Winger; attacking midfielder

Team information
- Current team: Anderlecht
- Number: 61

Youth career
- 2014–2016: BX Brussels
- 2016–2025: Anderlecht

Senior career*
Years	Team	Apps	(Gls)
2025–	RSCA Futures	18	(3)
2025–	Anderlecht	7	(1)

International career^{‡}
2024	Belgium U15	1	(0)
2024–2025	Belgium U16	3	(1)
2026–	Belgium U17	5	(1)
Medal record
Men's football
Representing Belgium
UEFA European Under-17 Championship
Runner-up	2026 Estonia
- * Club domestic league appearances and goals as of 3 September 2026 ‡ National team caps and goals as of 6 April 2026

Joshua-Williame Nga Kana (born 13 June 2009) is a Belgian professional footballer who plays as a winger for Anderlecht.

== Club career ==
Nga Kana is a youth product of BX Brussels and Anderlecht, joining the later in 2016.

In June 2024, he signed his first professional contract with Anderlecht.

Nga Kana made his professional debut with Anderlecht's reserve on 9 August 2025 in a 3–1 home Challenger Pro League loss against Kortrijk, replacing Elyess Dao on the 62nd minute.

During this 2025–26 season, the young winger proved to be a standout with RSCA Futures and was added to the first team by Besnik Hasi in January 2026.

Nga Kana made his first team debut with Anderlecht in a 4–2 away Belgian First Division loss to Club Brugge on 6 April 2026 under Jérémy Taravel.

== International career ==
Born in Belgium, Nga Kana was born to a Cameroonian father and Belgian mother. He is a youth international for Belgium, having played for the under-15, under-16 and under-17, where he established himself as a decisive scorer.

== Style of play ==
Nga Kana is able to play both as an advanced winger, a right midfielder or a more central attacking midfielder.

He is described as a dynamic player, with technical abilities and good vision of spaces and timing, helping him in both attack and defence.

== Career statistics ==
As of match played 3 September 2026

Appearances and goals by club, season and competition
Club	Season	League			Cup		Europe		Other		Total	
Club	Season	Division	Apps	Goals	Apps	Goals	Apps	Goals	Apps	Goals	Apps	Goals
RSCA Futures	2025–26	Challenger Pro League	18	3	—		—		—		18	3
Anderlecht	2025–26	Belgian Pro League	3	0	—		—		—		3	0
Anderlecht	2026–27	Belgian Pro League	4	1	0	0	5 (Note: Appearances in UEFA Europa League)	0	—		9	1
Anderlecht	Total		7	1	0	0	5	0	—		12	1
Career total			25	4	0	0	5	0	0	0	30	4

== Honours ==
Belgium U17

- UEFA European Under-17 Championship runner-up: 2026
