= Amando Lapage =

Belgian footballer

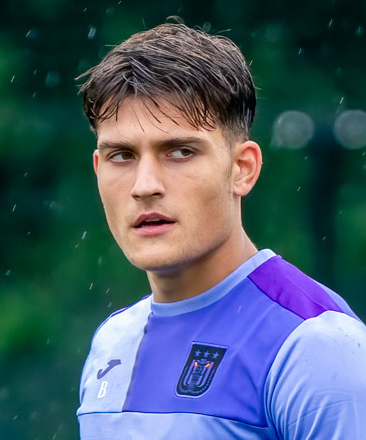
- Lapage with Anderlecht U23 in 2023

Personal information
- Date of birth: 8 November 2004 (age 22)
- Place of birth: Belgium
- Height: 1.87 m (6 ft 2 in)
- Position: Centre-back

Team information
- Current team: Westerlo
- Number: 4

Youth career
- –2022: Anderlecht

Senior career*
Years	Team	Apps	(Gls)
2022–2025	RSCA Futures	49	(2)
2024–2025	Anderlecht	2	(0)
2025–	Westerlo	16	(0)

International career^{‡}
2025–	Belgium U21	3	(0)
- * Club domestic league appearances and goals as of 10 February 2026 ‡ National team caps and goals as of 15:29, 18 November 2026 (UTC)

Amando Lapage (born 8 November 2004) is a Belgian professional footballer who plays as a centre-back for Belgian Pro League club Westerlo.

Lapage is the grandson of Paul Van Himst, club icon of Anderlecht and the Belgian National team.

== Career ==
Lapage is a youth exponent of Anderlecht, signing his first contract in May 2022. Featuring in the RSCA Futures squad in the Challenger Pro League, Lapage made his professional first-team debut as a substitute on 31 October 2024 in a 4-0 Belgian Cup win at Tubize-Braine.

The following weekend, he was handed a league debut as substitute in a 4–0 Belgian Pro League home win against Kortrijk on 3 November 2024.

On 4 February 2025, Lapage signed a four-and-a-half-year contract with Westerlo.
