= Nilson Angulo =

Ecuadorian footballer (born 2003)

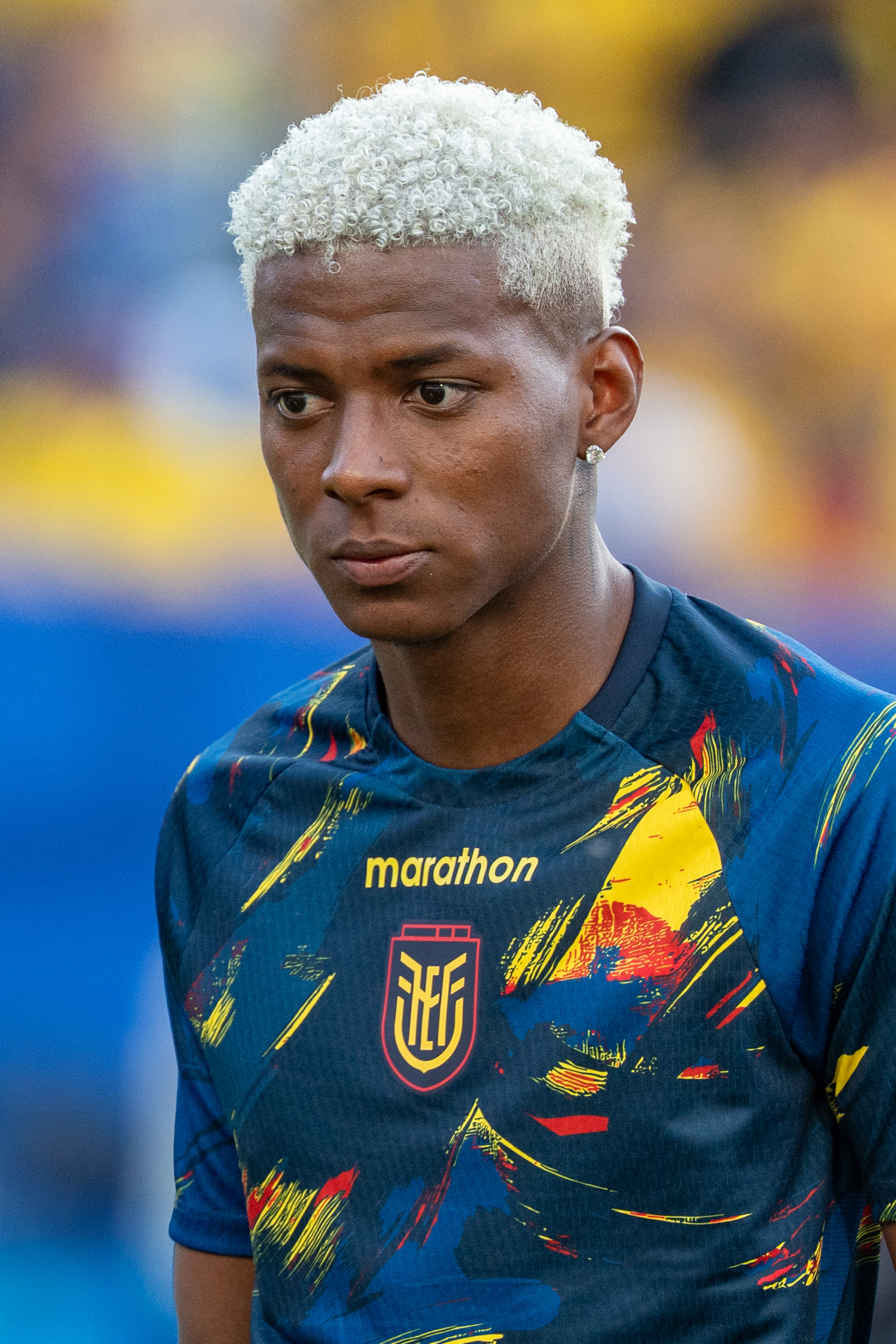
- Angulo with Ecuador in 2026

Personal information
- Full name: Nilson David Angulo Ramírez
- Date of birth: 19 June 2003 (age 23)
- Place of birth: Quinindé, Ecuador
- Height: 1.84 m (6 ft 0 in)
- Positions: Winger; wide midfielder

Team information
- Current team: Sunderland
- Number: 10

Youth career
- 2015–2018: Independiente del Valle
- 2018–2020: Norte América
- 2020–2021: LDU Quito
- 2020: → Atlético Kin (loan)

Senior career*
Years	Team	Apps	(Gls)
2021–2022	LDU Quito	35	(7)
2022–2026	Anderlecht	71	(8)
2022–2025	RSCA Futures	31	(9)
2026–	Sunderland	16	(1)

International career^{‡}
2023	Ecuador U20	4	(0)
2021–	Ecuador	21	(3)
- * Club domestic league appearances and goals as of 31 October 2026 ‡ National team caps and goals as of 5 October 2026

Nilson David Angulo Ramírez (born 19 June 2003) is an Ecuadorian professional footballer who plays as a winger or wide midfielder for Premier League club Sunderland and the Ecuador national team.

== Club career ==
Angulo started his senior career at LDU Quito. In June 2022, he joined Belgian Pro League side Anderlecht on a five-year deal. He scored his first goal for the club in a 2–1 away win over Club Brugge on 5 February 2024.

On 2 February 2026, Angulo signed for Sunderland on a four-and-a-half year deal.

== International career ==
In October 2021, Angulo made his senior international debut for Ecuador, playing in a 3–2 friendly win over Mexico. On 9 May 2023, Angulo was called up for the 2023 FIFA U-20 World Cup in Argentina.

On 31 May 2026, Angulo was selected in the 26-man squad for the 2026 FIFA World Cup. A month later, on 25 June, he scored a goal and was named Man of the Match in a 2–1 victory over Germany, helping his country secure qualification for the knockout stage.

== Career statistics ==
=== Club ===
As of match played 31 October 2026

Appearances and goals by club, season and competition
Club	Season	League			National cup (Note: Includes Belgian Cup, FA Cup)		League cup		Continental		Other		Total	
Club	Season	Division	Apps	Goals	Apps	Goals	Apps	Goals	Apps	Goals	Apps	Goals	Apps	Goals
LDU Quito	2021	LigaPro Serie A	11	1	0	0	—		1 (Note: Appearance(s) in Copa Sudamericana)	0	1 (Note: Appearance in Supercopa Ecuador)	0	13	1
LDU Quito	2022	LigaPro Serie A	13	2	0	0	—		8	3	—		21	5
LDU Quito	Total		24	3	0	0	—		9	3	1	0	34	6
Anderlecht	2022–23	Belgian Pro League	6	0	1	0	—		4 (Note: Appearances in UEFA Europa Conference League)	0	—		11	0
Anderlecht	2023–24	Belgian Pro League	14	1	0	0	—		—		—		14	1
Anderlecht	2024–25	Belgian Pro League	29	1	2	0	—		7 (Note: Appearances in UEFA Europa League)	1	—		38	2
Anderlecht	2025–26	Belgian Pro League	22	6	3	0	—		5 (Note: Two appearances in UEFA Europa League, three appearance and one goal in UEFA Conference League)	1	—		30	7
Anderlecht	Total		71	8	6	0	—		16	2	—		92	10
RSCA Futures	2022–23	Challenger Pro League	11	2	—		—		—		—		11	2
RSCA Futures	2023–24	Challenger Pro League	15	5	—		—		—		—		15	5
RSCA Futures	2024–25	Challenger Pro League	5	2	—		—		—		—		5	2
RSCA Futures	Total		31	9	—		—		—		—		31	9
Sunderland	2025–26	Premier League	8	0	1	0	—		—		—		9	0
Sunderland	2026–27	Premier League	8	1	0	0	0	0	3	0	—		11	1
Sunderland	Total		16	1	1	0	0	0	3	0	—		20	1
Career total			142	21	7	0	0	0	28	5	1	0	177	26

=== International ===
As of match played 5 October 2026

Appearances and goals by national team and year
National team	Year	Apps	Goals
Ecuador	2021	1	0
Ecuador	2022	2	0
Ecuador	2024	1	0
Ecuador	2025	8	1
Ecuador	2026	9	2
Total		21	3

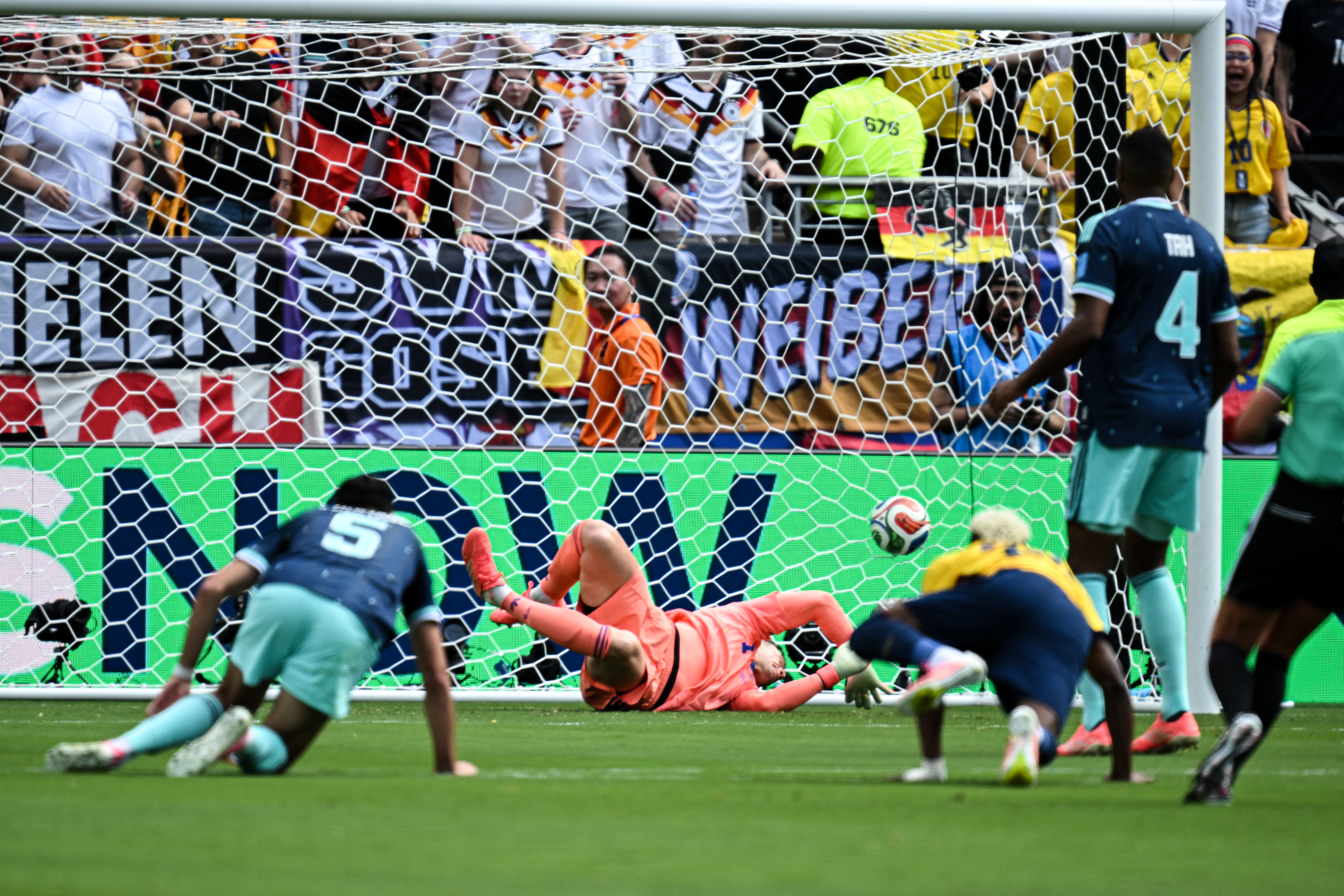
Angulo scoring against Germany at the 2026 FIFA World Cup

Scores and results list Venezuela's goal tally first, score column indicates score after each Angulo goal

List of international goals scored by Nilson Angulo
No.	Date	Venue	Cap	Opponent	Score	Result	Competition
1	18 November 2025	Sports Illustrated Stadium, Harrison, United States	12	New Zealand	1–0	2–0	Friendly
2	7 June 2026	ScottsMiracle-Gro Field, Columbus, United States	14	Guatemala	2–0	3–0	Friendly
3	25 June 2026	MetLife Stadium, East Rutherford, United States	17	Germany	1–1	2–1	2026 FIFA World Cup

== Honours ==
LDU Quito

- Supercopa Ecuador: 2021
