= Moussa N'Diaye (footballer, born 2002) =

Senegalese footballer

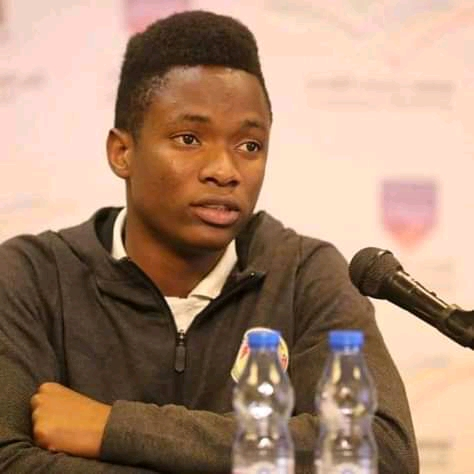
- N'Diaye in 2019

Personal information
- Full name: Moussa N'Diaye
- Date of birth: 18 June 2002 (age 24)
- Place of birth: Dakar, Senegal
- Height: 1.81 m (5 ft 11 in)
- Positions: Left-back; centre-back

Team information
- Current team: Werder Bremen (on loan from Anderlecht)
- Number: 16

Youth career
- 2017–2019: CNEPS Excellence
- 2020: Aspire Academy Senegal

Senior career*
Years	Team	Apps	(Gls)
2020–2022	Barcelona B	11	(0)
2022–	Anderlecht	76	(1)
2022–2024	RSCA Futures	6	(0)
2026	→ Schalke 04 (loan)	14	(0)
2026–	→ Werder Bremen (loan)	0	(0)

International career
2019	Senegal U20	10	(0)
2022	Senegal U23	2	(0)
- * Club domestic league appearances and goals as of 30 August 2026

Moussa N'Diaye (born 18 June 2002) is a Senegalese professional footballer who plays as a left-back for Bundesliga club Werder Bremen, on loan from Belgian Pro League club Anderlecht.

== Club career ==
In 2020, N'Diaye signed for Spanish third-tier side Barcelona Atlètic. In 2022, he signed for Anderlecht in the Belgian top flight. He scored his first goal for Anderlecht on 13 August 2023, the winner in a 1–0 victory against Sint-Truiden.

On 2 February 2026, he was loaned to 2. Bundesliga club Schalke 04 until the end of the season.

On 1 September 2026, the last day of the summer transfer window, N'Diaye returned to Germany on a new loan, joining Werder Bremen of the Bundesliga. Werder secured an option to sign him permanently.

== International career ==
N'Diaye represented the Senegal under-20 team at the 2019 Africa U-20 Cup of Nations and 2019 FIFA U-20 World Cup. In November 2022, he was called up to the Senegal senior team for the 2022 FIFA World Cup in Qatar, replacing the injured Sadio Mané in the squad.

== Career statistics ==
As of match played 30 August 2026

Appearances and goals by club, season and competition
Club	Season	League			National cup (Note: Includes Belgian Cup)		Europe		Total	
Club	Season	Division	Apps	Goals	Apps	Goals	Apps	Goals	Apps	Goals
Barcelona B	2020–21	Segunda División B	0	0	—		—		0	0
Barcelona B	2021–22	Primera Federación	11	0	—		—		11	0
Barcelona B	Total		11	0	—		—		11	0
Anderlecht	2022–23	Belgian Pro League	15	0	2	0	8 (Note: Appearances in UEFA Europa Conference League)	0	25	0
Anderlecht	2023–24	Belgian Pro League	14	1	2	0	—		16	1
Anderlecht	2024–25	Belgian Pro League	27	0	5	1	9 (Note: Appearances in UEFA Europa League)	0	41	1
Anderlecht	2025–26	Belgian Pro League	17	0	1	0	2 (Note: One appearance in UEFA Europa League and one appearance in UEFA Conference League)	0	20	0
Anderlecht	2026–27	Belgian Pro League	3	0	0	0	4 (Note: Appearances in UEFA Europa League)	0	7	0
Anderlecht	Total		76	1	10	1	23	0	109	2
RSCA Futures	2022–23	Challenger Pro League	4	0	—		—		4	0
RSCA Futures	2023–24	Challenger Pro League	2	0	—		—		2	0
RSCA Futures	Total		6	0	—		—		6	0
Schalke 04 (loan)	2025–26	2. Bundesliga	14	0	—		—		14	0
Werder Bremen (loan)	2026–27	Bundesliga	0	0	0	0	—		0	0
Career total			107	1	10	1	23	0	140	2

== Honours ==
Schalke 04

- 2. Bundesliga: 2025–26

Individual

- U-20 Africa Cup of Nations Golden Ball: 2019
