= Tristan Degreef =

Belgian footballer

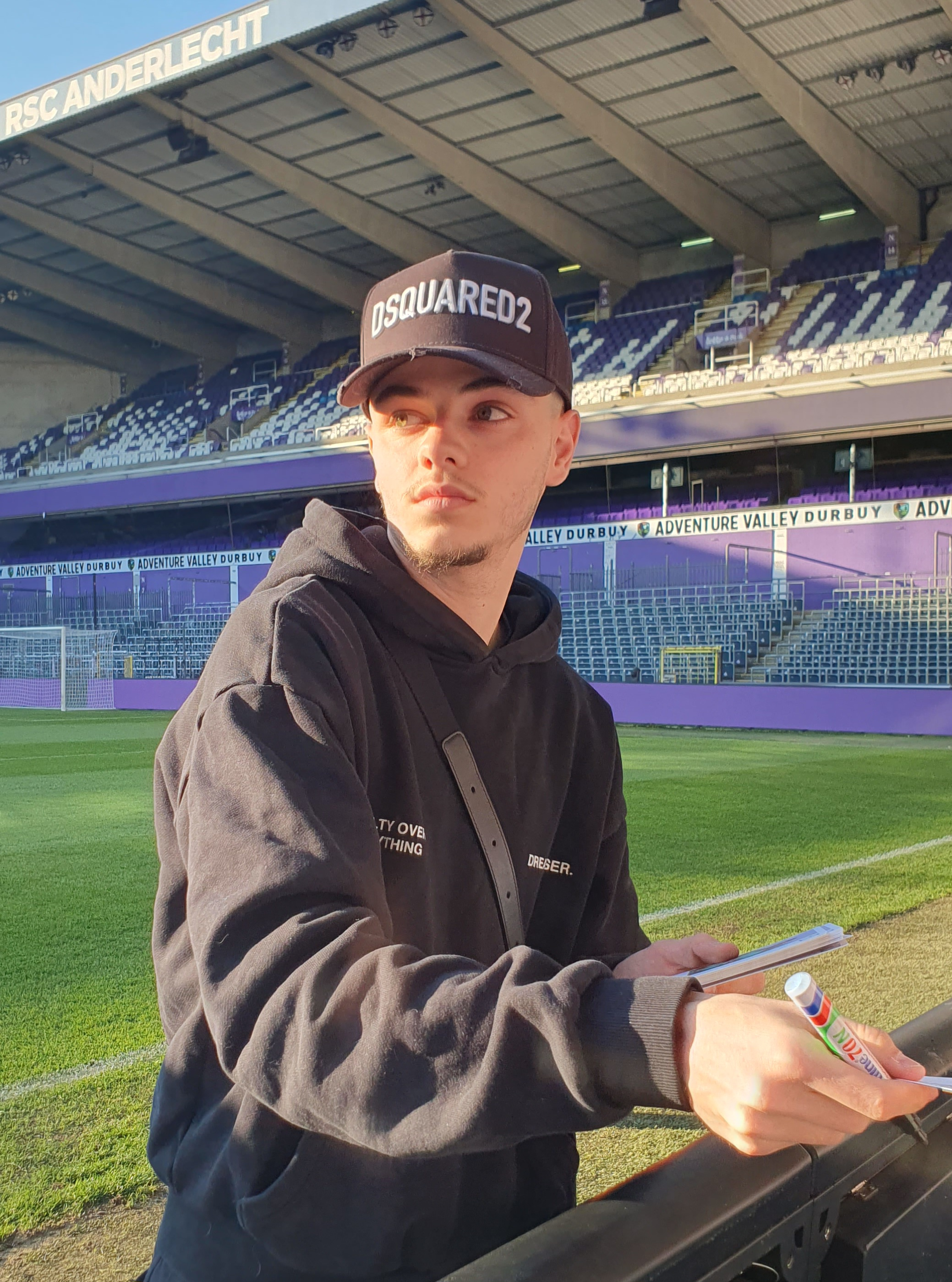
- Degreef with Anderlecht in 2025

Personal information
- Date of birth: 19 January 2005 (age 21)
- Place of birth: Leuven, Belgium
- Height: 1.77 m (5 ft 10 in)
- Position: Winger

Team information
- Current team: Anderlecht
- Number: 83

Youth career
- –2022: Anderlecht

Senior career*
Years	Team	Apps	(Gls)
2022–	RSCA Futures	32	(4)
2024–	Anderlecht	51	(3)

International career^{‡}
2023–2024	Belgium U19	9	(2)
2025–	Belgium U21	1	(0)
- * Club domestic league appearances and goals as of 25 October 2026 ‡ National team caps and goals as of 09:24, 5 September 2025 (UTC)

Tristan Degreef (born 19 January 2005) is a Belgian professional footballer who plays as a winger for Belgian Pro League club Anderlecht.

== Career ==
Degreef is a youth product of Anderlecht, signing his first contract in July 2021. He made his professional debut on 22 February 2024, in a 2–2 Belgian Pro League home draw against Union Saint-Gilloise.

== International career ==
Degreef is a youth international for Belgium.

== Career statistics ==
As of match played 25 October 2026

Appearances and goals by club, season and competition
Club	Season	League			Belgian Cup		Europe		Other		Total	
Club	Season	Division	Apps	Goals	Apps	Goals	Apps	Goals	Apps	Goals	Apps	Goals
RSCA Futures	2022–23	Challenger Pro League	8	0	—		—		—		8	0
RSCA Futures	2023–24	Challenger Pro League	20	3	—		—		—		20	3
RSCA Futures	2024–25	Challenger Pro League	4	1	—		—		—		4	1
RSCA Futures	Total		32	4	—		—		—		32	4
Anderlecht	2023–24	Belgian Pro League	1	0	3	0	—		—		4	0
Anderlecht	2024–25	Belgian Pro League	13	0	4	1	7 (Note: Appearances in UEFA Europa League)	1	—		24	2
Anderlecht	2025–26	Belgian Pro League	34	4	5	1	5 (Note: Two appearances in UEFA Europa League, three appearances in UEFA Conference League)	0	—		44	5
Anderlecht	2026–27	Belgian Pro League	5	0	1	0	7	1	—		13	1
Anderlecht	Total		53	4	13	2	19	2	—		85	8
Career total			85	8	13	2	19	2	0	0	117	12
