= Gassimou Sylla =

Guinean footballer

Personal information
- Full name: Gassimou Sylla
- Date of birth: 10 August 2008 (age 18)
- Place of birth: Guinea
- Height: 1.85 m (6 ft 1 in)
- Position: Forward

Team information
- Current team: RSCA Futures
- Number: 57

Youth career
- –2024: Anderlecht

Senior career*
Years	Team	Apps	(Gls)
2024–	RSCA Futures	29	(5)

International career^{‡}
2023	Belgium U15	3	(1)
2024	Belgium U16	5	(0)
2024–2025	Belgium U17	9	(4)
2026–	Guinea	1	(0)
- * Club domestic league appearances and goals as of 18:56, 4 June 2026 (UTC) ‡ National team caps and goals as of 18:56, 4 June 2026 (UTC)

Gassimou Sylla (born 10 August 2008) is a Guinean professional footballer who plays as a forward for Challenger Pro League club RSCA Futures and the Guinea national team.

== Career ==
Sylla is a youth product of Anderlecht. On 30 July 2024, he signed his first professional contract. He made his professionial debut on 16 August 2024, in a 4–1 Challenger Pro League defeat against KMSK Deinze. He scored his first goal in his debut game.

== International career ==
Born in Guinea, Sylla moved to Belgium at a young age. He was a youth international for Belgium. He was called up to the senior Guinea national team for friendlies in June 2026.
