= Luis Vázquez (footballer) =

Argentine footballer (born 2001)

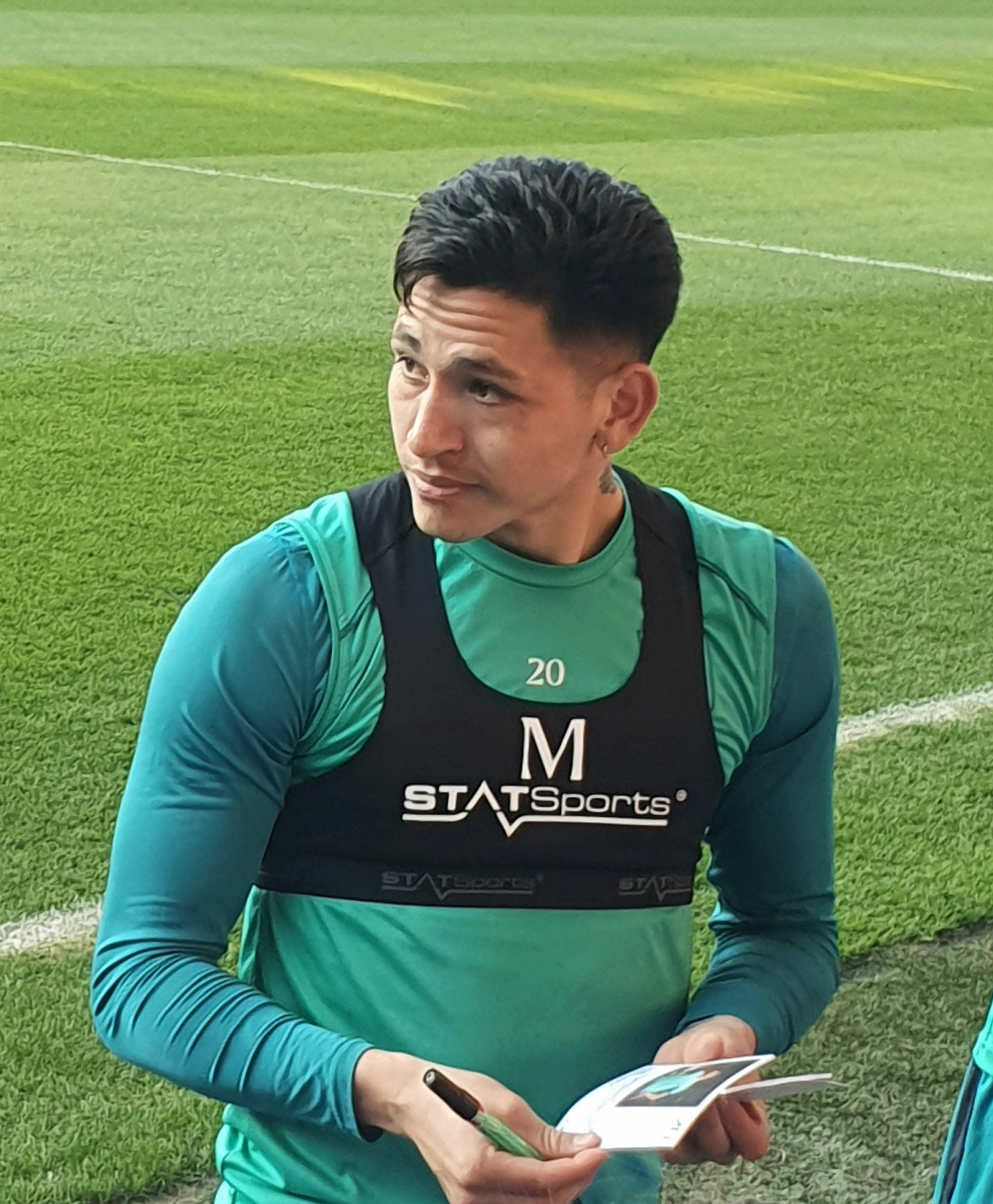
- Vázquez in 2025 with Anderlecht

Personal information
- Full name: Luis Ismael Vázquez
- Date of birth: 24 April 2001 (age 25)
- Place of birth: Recreo, Argentina
- Height: 1.90 m (6 ft 3 in)
- Position: Forward

Team information
- Current team: Birmingham City
- Number: 32

Youth career
- –2018: Patronato

Senior career*
Years	Team	Apps	(Gls)
2018–2019	Patronato	1	(0)
2019–2023	Boca Juniors	77	(12)
2023–2026	Anderlecht	90	(13)
2026	→ Getafe (loan)	17	(3)
2026–	Birmingham City	0	(0)

International career^{‡}
2023	Argentina U23	2	(0)
- * Club domestic league appearances and goals as of 28 July 2026 ‡ National team caps and goals as of 21 November 2023

Luis Ismael Vázquez (born 24 April 2001) is an Argentine professional footballer who plays as a forward for EFL Championship club Birmingham City.

== Career ==
On 21 January 2026, he joined Getafe CF on loan.

On 28 July 2026, Vázquez signed a three-year contract with EFL Championship club Birmingham City for an undisclosed fee.

== Career statistics ==
As of 24 May 2026

Appearances and goals by club, season and competition
Club	Season	League			Cup (Note: Includes Copa Argentina and Belgian Cup)		Continental		Other		Total	
Club	Season	Division	Apps	Goals	Apps	Goals	Apps	Goals	Apps	Goals	Apps	Goals
Patronato	2017–18	AFA Liga Profesional de Fútbol	0	0	1	0	—		0	0	1	0
Boca Juniors	2020–21	AFA Liga Profesional de Fútbol	1	0	0	0	0	0	—		1	0
Boca Juniors	2021	AFA Liga Profesional de Fútbol	24	7	1	0	2 (Note: Appearances in Copa Libertadores)	0	—		29	7
Boca Juniors	2022	AFA Liga Profesional de Fútbol	39	4	3	1	5	0	—		47	5
Boca Juniors	2023	AFA Liga Profesional de Fútbol	13	1	1	0	5	2	—		19	3
Boca Juniors	Total		77	12	5	1	12	2	0	0	96	15
Anderlecht	2023–24	Belgian Pro League	38	7	3	0	—		—		41	7
Anderlecht	2024–25	Belgian Pro League	38	4	6	0	11 (Note: Appearances in UEFA Europa League)	4	—		55	8
Anderlecht	2025–26	Belgian Pro League	14	2	2	0	3 (Note: Two appearances in UEFA Europa League, one appearance in UEFA Conference League)	0	—		19	2
Anderlecht	2026–27	Belgian Pro League	0	0	0	0	0	0	—		0	0
Anderlecht	Total		90	13	11	0	14	4	—		115	17
Getafe (loan)	2025–26	La Liga	17	3	—		—		—		17	3
Career total			184	28	17	1	26	6	0	0	228	35

== Honours ==
Boca Juniors

- Primera División: 2022
- Copa Argentina: 2019–20
- Copa de la Liga Profesional: 2020, 2022
- Supercopa Argentina: 2022
