= Jan-Carlo Simić =

Serbian footballer (born 2005)

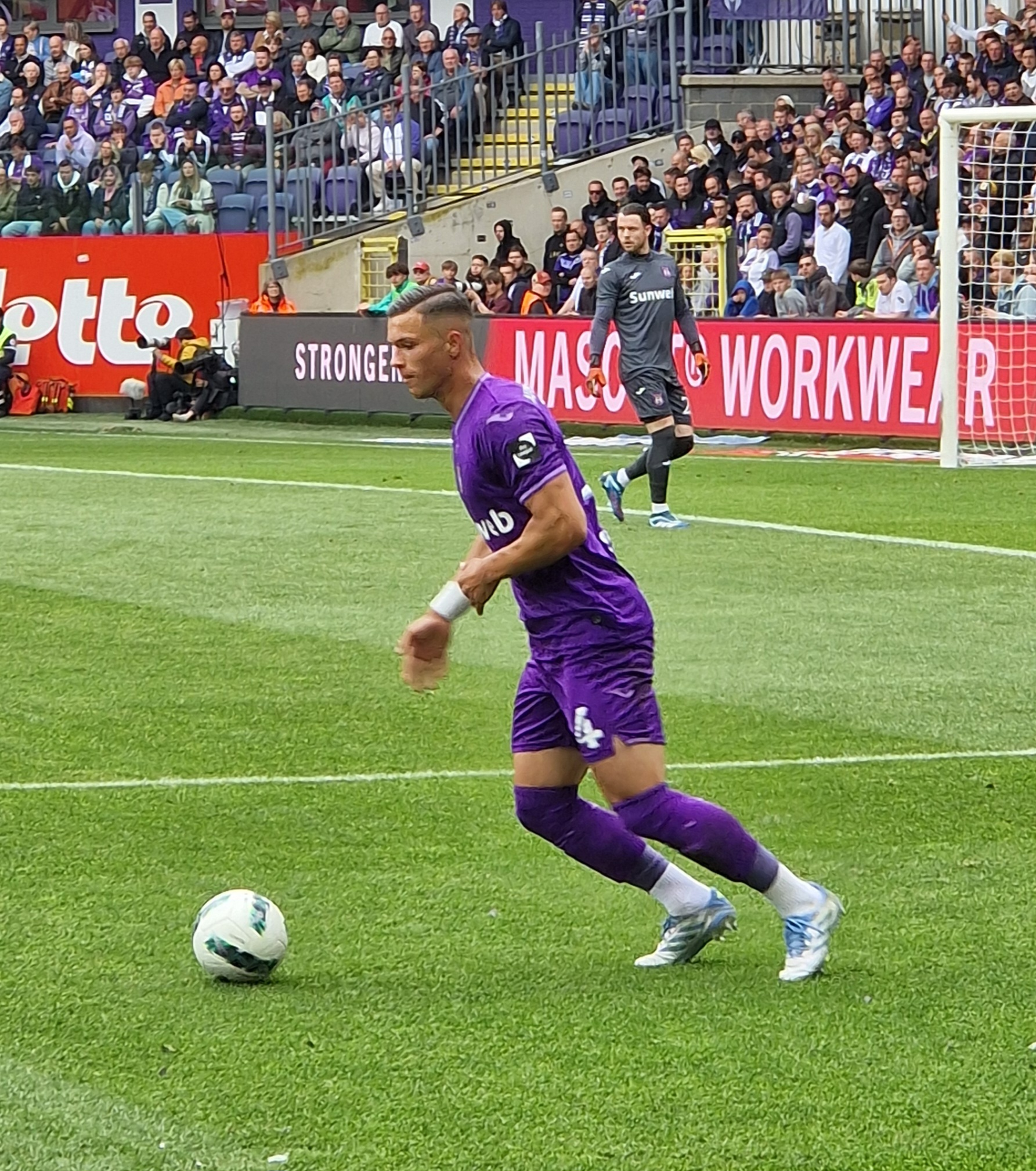
- Simić with Anderlecht in 2025

Personal information
- Date of birth: 2 May 2005 (age 21)
- Place of birth: Nürtingen, Germany
- Height: 1.86 m (6 ft 1 in)
- Position: Centre-back

Team information
- Current team: Al-Ittihad
- Number: 4

Youth career
- –2016: SV Hegnach
- 2016–2018: Stuttgarter Kickers
- 2018–2022: VfB Stuttgart
- 2022–2024: AC Milan

Senior career*
Years	Team	Apps	(Gls)
2023–2024	AC Milan	4	(1)
2024–2025	Anderlecht	35	(3)
2025–	Al-Ittihad	13	(0)

International career^{‡}
2021	Serbia U16	1	(0)
2022	Serbia U17	5	(1)
2022	Serbia U18	2	(0)
2022–	Serbia U19	13	(2)
2024–	Serbia	6	(0)
- * Club domestic league appearances and goals as of 22:35, 10 October 2026 (UTC) ‡ National team caps and goals as of 14 October 2025

Jan-Carlo Simić (Serbian: Јан-Карло Симић, romanized: Jan-Karlo Simić; born 2 May 2005) is a professional footballer who plays as a centre-back for Saudi Pro League club Al-Ittihad. Born in Germany, he plays for the Serbia national team.

== Early life ==
Simić was born in Nürtingen, Germany, to Bosnian Serb parents from Višegrad, Bosnia and Herzegovina.

== Club career ==
=== Early career ===
Simić started his youth career at SV Hegnach, then moving to Stuttgarter Kickers in 2016 and local rivals VfB Stuttgart in 2018.

=== AC Milan ===
In 2022, Simić was signed by Italian club AC Milan on a reported €1 million fee, joining the under-19 Primavera team. During the 2023–24 season, he started featuring for the first team, playing in some summer-friendly games, including those against Real Madrid and Juventus.

On 17 December 2023, in his Serie A debut for the Rossoneri, he scored a goal after coming on as a substitute in the 24th minute for the injured Tommaso Pobega, contributing to a 3–0 victory against Monza.

=== Anderlecht ===
On 23 July 2024, Simić joined Belgian Pro League side Anderlecht on a permanent deal, for a fee reported to be in the region of €3 million, with a 20% sell-on clause in favour of AC Milan; he signed a five-year contract with the Belgian club.

=== Al-Ittihad ===
On 10 September 2025, he joined Saudi Pro League club Al-Ittihad for €21 million on a four-year deal.

== International career ==
Eligible to play for Germany and Bosnia and Herzegovina, Simić chose to represent Serbia at international level, being part of the squad that played in the 2022 UEFA European Under-17 Championship.

Simić was called up to the senior Serbia national team for the first time for the Nations League games against Spain and Denmark in September 2024. He debuted on 5 September 2024 against Spain at the Rajko Mitić Stadium. He substituted Strahinja Eraković at the half-time of a scoreless draw.

== Career statistics ==
=== Club ===
As of match played 17 February 2026

Appearances and goals by club, season and competition
Club	Season	League			National cup		Continental		Other		Total	
Club	Season	Division	Apps	Goals	Apps	Goals	Apps	Goals	Apps	Goals	Apps	Goals
AC Milan	2023–24	Serie A	4	1	2	0	0	0	—		6	1
Anderlecht	2024–25	Belgian Pro League	33	3	6	1	10 (Note: Appearances in UEFA Europa League)	0	—		49	4
Anderlecht	2025–26	Belgian Pro League	2	0	0	0	2 (Note: One appearance in UEFA Europa League, one appearance in UEFA Conference League)	0	—		4	0
Anderlecht	Total		35	3	6	1	12	0	—		53	4
Al-Ittihad	2025–26	Saudi Pro League	8	0	1	0	6 (Note: Appearances in AFC Champions League Elite)	0	—		15	0
Career total			47	4	9	1	18	0	0	0	74	5

=== International ===
As of match played 14 October 2025

Appearances and goals by national team and year
National team	Year	Apps	Goals
Serbia	2024	3	0
Serbia	2025	3	0
Total		6	0
