= Nunzio Engwanda =

Belgian footballer (born 2007)

Personal information
- Full name: Nunzio Engwanda-Ongena
- Date of birth: 1 December 2007 (age 18)
- Height: 1.80 m (5 ft 11 in)
- Position: Centre-back

Team information
- Current team: RSCA Futures
- Number: 71

Youth career
- –2023: Anderlecht

Senior career*
Years	Team	Apps	(Gls)
2023–	RSCA Futures	70	(1)
2024–2025	Anderlecht	2	(0)

International career^{‡}
2022	Belgium U15	6	(0)
2022–2023	Belgium U16	13	(0)
2023	Belgium U17	4	(1)
2024–2025	Belgium U18	8	(0)
2025–	Belgium U19	7	(0)
- * Club domestic league appearances and goals as of 21 August 2026 ‡ National team caps and goals as of 31 March 2026

Nunzio Engwanda-Ongena (born 1 December 2007) is a Belgian professional footballer who plays as a centre-back for Challenger Pro League club RSCA Futures.

== Career ==
Engwanda is a youth product of Anderlecht. He signed his first contract on 19 August 2023. He made his professional debut on 11 August 2023, in a 1–3 Challenger Pro League defeat against Beerschot. On 12 July 2024, he signed a new contract until 2027. He made his first team debut on 15 December 2024 against Sint-Truiden.

== International career ==
Engwanda is a youth international for Belgium.

== Personal life ==
Born in Belgium, Engwanda is of Congolese (DR) descent. His brother, Alonzo, is also a professional footballer.
