= 2025–26 RSC Anderlecht season =

RSC Anderlecht
2025–26 season
- Chairman: Wouter Vandenhaute; Michael Verschueren
- Manager: Besnik Hasi (until 1 February); Edward Still (from 1 February until 9 February); Jérémy Taravel (from 9 February)
- Stadium: Lotto Park
- Belgian Pro League: 6th
- Champions' play-offs: 4th
- Belgian Cup: Runners-up
- UEFA Europa League: Second qualifying round
- UEFA Conference League: Play-off round
- Top goalscorer: League: Thorgan Hazard (13); All: Thorgan Hazard (15)
- Average home league attendance: 20,199
Home colours	Away colours	Third colours

The 2025–26 season was the 118th season in the history of RSC Anderlecht, and the club's 91st consecutive season in the Belgian Pro League. In addition to the domestic league, the club participated in the Belgian Cup, the UEFA Europa League and the UEFA Conference League.

== Season summary ==
On 1 February 2026, Besnik Hasi was dismissed from his role as manager. Edward Still was appointed as interim coach in his place.

On 9 February 2026, Edward Still left his role as interim manager to join Watford. Jérémy Taravel was appointed caretaker manager of the club.

== Players ==
=== First-team squad ===
As of 31 January 2026

Note: Flags indicate national team as defined under FIFA eligibility rules; some limited exceptions apply. Players may hold more than one non-FIFA nationality.

No.	Pos.	Nation	Player
2	DF	GER	Zoumana Keita
3	DF	DEN	Lucas Hey
4	DF	FRA	Mathys Angély (on loan from Wolfsburg)
6	DF	SWE	Ludwig Augustinsson
7	DF	SEN	Ilay Camara
9	FW	SRB	Mihajlo Cvetković
10	MF	BEL	Yari Verschaeren
11	MF	BEL	Thorgan Hazard
13	MF	CAN	Nathan Saliba
14	FW	UKR	Danylo Sikan
15	DF	SRB	Mihajlo Ilić (on loan from Bologna)
21	FW	MEX	César Huerta
22	FW	MAR	Elyess Dao
23	MF	BEL	Mats Rits
24	MF	NED	Enric Llansana

No.	Pos.	Nation	Player
25	DF	BEL	Thomas Foket
26	GK	BEL	Colin Coosemans (captain)
29	MF	COD	Mario Stroeykens
32	GK	GER	Justin Heekeren
54	DF	BEL	Killian Sardella
55	DF	BEL	Marco Kana
73	GK	SWE	Joachim Imbrechts
74	MF	BEL	Nathan De Cat
77	FW	ESP	Coba da Costa (on loan from Getafe)
78	MF	MAR	Anas Tajaouart
79	DF	MAR	Ali Maamar
83	FW	BEL	Tristan Degreef
91	FW	BEL	Adriano Bertaccini
93	DF	MLI	Moussa Diarra (on loan from Deportivo Alavés)
99	FW	MLI	Ibrahim Kanaté

=== Out on loan ===
Note: Flags indicate national team as defined under FIFA eligibility rules; some limited exceptions apply. Players may hold more than one non-FIFA nationality.

No.	Pos.	Nation	Player
—	DF	SEN	Moussa N'Diaye (at Schalke 04 until 30 June 2026)
—	MF	GHA	Majeed Ashimeru (at La Louvière until 30 June 2026)
—	MF	NED	Cedric Hatenboer (at Telsar until 30 June 2026)

No.	Pos.	Nation	Player
—	FW	JPN	Keisuke Goto (at Sint-Truiden until 30 June 2026)
—	FW	ARG	Luis Vázquez (at Getafe until 30 June 2026)

== Transactions ==
=== Transfers in ===
Pos.	Player	Transferred from	Fee	Date	Source
FW	(Serbia) Mihajlo Cvetković	(Serbia) Čukarički		23 April 2025	
DF	(Germany) Zoumana Keita	(Germany) Viktoria Köln		3 June 2025	
MF	(Canada) Nathan Saliba	(Canada) CF Montréal		26 June 2025	
MF	(Netherlands) Enric Llansana	(Netherlands) Go Ahead Eagles		1 July 2025	
MF	(Senegal) Ilay Camara	(Belgium) Standard Liège		5 July 2025	
FW	(Belgium) Adriano Bertaccini	(Belgium) Sint-Truiden		1 August 2025	
DF	(Turkey) Yasin Özcan	(England) Aston Villa	Loan	2 August 2025	
DF	(Serbia) Mihajlo Ilić	(Italy) Bologna		8 September 2025	
GK	(Germany) Justin Heekeren	(Germany) FC Schalke 04	Transfer	20 January 2026	
FW	(Ukraine) Danylo Sikan	(Turkey) Trabzonspor	Transfer	21 January 2026	
DF	(Mali) Moussa Diarra	(Spain) Deportivo Alavés	Loan with an option to buy	27 January 2026	
MF	(Spain) Coba da Costa	(Spain) Getafe CF	Loan with option to buy	2 February 2026	
DF	(France) Mathys Angély	(Germany) VfL Wolfsburg	Loan	3 February 2026	

=== Transfers out ===
Pos.	Player	Transferred to	Fee	Date	Source
MF	(Netherlands) Cedric Hatenboer	(Netherlands) SC Telstar	Loan	5 January 2026	
GK	(Denmark) Mads Kikkenborg	(Norway) Molde FK	Transfer	20 January 2026	
FW	(Argentina) Luis Vázquez	(Spain) Getafe CF	Loan	21 January 2026	
DF	(Turkey) Yasin Özcan	(Turkey) Beşiktaş J.K.	Loan	28 January 2026	
DF	(Senegal) Moussa N'Diaye	(Germany) FC Schalke 04	Loan	2 February 2026	

== Friendlies ==
28 June 2025	KWSC Lauwe	1–3	Anderlecht
	Goal	Report	Goal

2 July 2025	Anderlecht	2–2	AEK Larnaca
	Goal	Report	Goal

5 July 2025	Anderlecht	1–0	Aris
	Goal	Report

12 July 2025	Anderlecht	2–2	Raków Częstochowa
12:00	Goal	Report	Goal

12 July 2025	Anderlecht	5–0	FC Dordrecht
17:00	Goal	Report

19 July 2025	Anderlecht	1–0	Dender E.H.
12:00	Goal	Report	Goal

7 January 2026	FC St. Gallen	2–1	Anderlecht
	Gaal 32'; Quintillà 68'		Cvetković 81'

== Competitions ==
=== Belgian Pro League ===
==== Regular season ====
Pos	Team	Pld	W	D	L	GF	GA	GD	Pts	Qualification or relegation
4	Gent	30	13	6	11	49	43	+6	45	Qualification for the Champions' play-offs
5	Mechelen	30	12	9	9	39	37	+2	45	Qualification for the Champions' play-offs
6	Anderlecht	30	12	8	10	43	39	+4	44	Qualification for the Champions' play-offs
7	Genk	30	11	9	10	46	47	−1	42	Qualification for the Europe play-offs
8	Standard Liège	30	11	7	12	27	35	−8	40	Qualification for the Europe play-offs

Source: Jupiler Pro League (in Dutch)
Rules for classification: 1) Points; 2) Matches won; 3) Goal difference; 4) Goals scored; 5) Away matches won; 6) Away goal difference; 7) Away goals scored; 8) Play-off.

==== Matches ====
27 July 2025 1	Anderlecht	5–2	Westerlo	Anderlecht
13:30 UTC+2	Hazard 19', 90+1'; Hey (yellow card) 23'; Degreef 37', (yellow card) 64'; Llansana (yellow card) 44'; Angulo 65'; Saliba 70'; Vázquez (yellow card) 80'		Vaesen 46', (yellow card) 71'; Van den Keybus (yellow card) 54'; Frigan 58'	Stadium: Constant Vanden Stock Stadium; Attendance: 19,500; Referee: Simon Bourdeaud'hui

3 August 2025 2	Cercle Brugge	0–2	Anderlecht	Jan Breydel Stadium
		Report	Hazard 8'; Bertaccini 79'

10 August 2025 3	Anderlecht	2–3	Zulte Waregem
	Dolberg 50'; Tanghe 74' (o.g.)	Report	Hedl 30'; Ujka 69'; Erenbjerg 94'

17 August 2025 4	Dender EH	0–2	Anderlecht
		Report	Huerta 71'; Hazard 84'

31 August 2025 5	Union Saint-Gilloise	2–0	Anderlecht	Brussels
18:30 CEST	Florucz 4' (pen.); Rasmussen (yellow card) 86'; David 90+1'	Report	Huerta (yellow card) 38'; Saliba (yellow card) 51' (yellow-red card) 81'; Angulo (yellow card) 52' (yellow-red card) 83'; Hazard (yellow card) 72'	Stadium: Joseph Marien Stadium

14 September 2025 6	Anderlecht	1–1	KRC Genk
	Vásquez 57'	Report	Erabi 79'

20 September 2025 7	Anderlecht	0–0	Antwerp	Anderlecht
20:45 CEST (UTC+2)	Huerta (yellow card) 52'; Vázquez (yellow card) 59'; Saliba (yellow card) 90'		Al-Sahafi (yellow card) 49'; Kouyaté (yellow card) 90'	Stadium: Lotto Park; Attendance: 22,500; Referee: Erik Lambrechts

23 September 2025 8	Anderlecht	1–0	KAA Gent
	Stroeykens 68'	Report

26 September 2025 9	OH Leuven	1–1	Anderlecht
	Maziz 80'	Report	Vázquez 55'

5 October 2025 10	Anderlecht	1–0	Standard Liège
	Cvetković 54'	Report

19 October 2025 11	Sint-Truiden	2–2	Anderlecht
	Yamamoto 18'; Matsuzawa 76'	Report	De Cat 11'; Cvetković 19'

24 October 2025 12	Charleroi	1–0	Anderlecht	Charleroi
20:45 UTC+2	Guiagon (yellow card) 49'; Keita 82'; Guiton (yellow card) 90+5'		N'Diaye (yellow card) 90+1'; Bertaccini (yellow card) 90+5'	Stadium: Stade du Pays de Charleroi; Attendance: 9,984; Referee: Lawrence Visser

1 November 2025 13	Anderlecht	3–1	K.V. Mechelen
	Bertaccini 12'; Cvetković 25'; Angulo 60'	Report	Servais 20'

9 November 2025 14	Anderlecht	1–0	Club Brugge
	Mechele 6' (o.g.)	Report

23 November 2025 15	RAAL La Louvière	0–1	Anderlecht
		Report	Kanaté 92'

30 November 2025 16	Anderlecht	1–0	Union Saint-Gilloise	Brussels
18:30 CET	Angulo 11'; De Cat (yellow card) 29'; Hazard (yellow card) 74'		Van de Perre (yellow card) 9'; Ait El Hadj (yellow card) 25'; Khalaili (yellow card) 69'; Burgess (yellow card) 90+6'	Stadium: Lotto Park

7 December 2025 17	K.V.C. Westerlo	4–0	Anderlecht
	Piedfort 1'; Sayyadmanesh 34', 44'; Reynolds 57'	Report

13 December 2025 18	Anderlecht	2–1	Sint-Truiden
	Saliba 68'; Angulo 71'	Report	Gotō 53'

21 December 2025 19	Antwerp	2–2	Anderlecht	Antwerp
18:30 CET (UTC+1)	Janssen 16' (pen.); Somers 19'		Llansana (yellow card) 15'; Hazard 49' (pen.); Bertaccini (yellow card) 52'; Degreef 87'; Maamar (yellow card) 90+1'	Stadium: Bosuilstadion; Attendance: 20,495; Referee: Erik Lambrechts

26 December 2025 20	Anderlecht	1–2	Charleroi	Anderlecht
20:45 UTC+2	Hazard 24' (pen.); Hey (yellow card) 25'		Camara 12', (yellow card) 38'; Guiagon 15'; Bernier (yellow card) 44'; Blum (yellow card) 77'; Titraoui (yellow card) 90+2'	Stadium: Lotto Park; Referee: Bram van Driessche

18 January 2026 21	KAA Gent	4–2	Anderlecht
	Kanga 37'; Tiago Araújo 81'; Dean 84'; Goore 94'	Report	Angulo 4', 43'

25 January 2026 22	Anderlecht	0–0	F.C.V. Dender E.H.
		Report

1 February 2026 23	Standard Liège	2–0	Anderlecht
	Karamoko 29'; Saïd 48'	Report

8 February 2026 24	KRC Genk	2–0	Anderlecht
	Sor 68'; Mirisola 84'	Report

15 February 2026 25	Anderlecht	0–0	RAAL La Louvière
		Report

22 February 2026 26	SV Zulte Waregem	2–4	Anderlecht
	Ementa 53'; Aké 91'	Report	Hazard 39', 41', 85'; Camara 43'

28 February 2026 27	Anderlecht	5–1	OH Leuven
	Pletinckx 29' (o.g.); Hazard 47', 71'; Cvetković 52'; Bertaccini 94'	Report	Gil 7'

8 March 2026 28	Club Brugge	2–2	Anderlecht
	Tresoldi 42', 85'	Report	De Cat 36'; Degreef 53'

15 March 2026 29	Mechelen	1–0	Anderlecht
	van Brederode 91'	Report

22 March 2026 30	Anderlecht	2–3	Cercle Brugge
	Cvetković 25'; Hazard 91'	Report	Diop; Gerkens 28'; Kakou 35'

==== Champions' play-offs ====
===== League table =====
Pos	Team	Pld	W	D	L	GF	GA	GD	Pts	Qualification or relegation	CLU	USG	STR	AND	GNT	MEC
2	Union SG	10	6	2	2	16	10	+6	53	Qualification for the Champions League third qualifying round	2–1	—	1–0	5–1	0–0	3–0
3	Sint-Truiden	10	4	2	4	14	11	+3	43	Qualification for the Europa League play-off round (Note: Union SG won the 2025–26 Belgian Cup and qualified for the Champions League through finishing in the top two, the Europa League play-off round berth was therefore transferred to Sint-Truiden.)	1–2	2–1	—	2–0	1–1	3–0
4	Anderlecht	10	3	2	5	16	23	−7	33	Qualification for the Europa League second qualifying round	1–3	1–3	3–1	—	3–1	2–2
5	Gent (O)	10	0	6	4	4	14	−10	29	Qualification for the European competition play-off	0–2	0–0	0–0	1–1	—	1–1
6	Mechelen	10	1	3	6	9	24	−15	29		2–2	0–1	1–4	1–2	1–0	—

Source: Jupiler Pro League (in Dutch), Soccerway
Legend: Blue = home team win; Yellow = draw; Red = away team win.
Rules for classification: 1) Points; 2) Points without (possible) half points added due to rounding; 3) Regular season finishing position.
(O) Play-off winners

===== Matches =====
6 April 2026 1	Club Brugge	4–2	Anderlecht	Jan Breydel Stadium
	Sabbe 15'; Stanković 29'; Tzolis 37'; Vermant 90+4'	Report	Hazard 55'; Cvetković 90+1'	Attendance: 24,484; Referee: Jasper Vergoote

12 April 2026 2	Anderlecht	3–1	KAA Gent	Constant Vanden Stock Stadium
	Verschaeren 79'; Degreef 90+3'; Bertaccini 90+6'	Report	Kanga 22' (pen.)	Attendance: 15,029; Referee: Lawrence Visser

18 April 2026 3	K.V. Mechelen	1–2	Anderlecht	Achter de Kazerne
	Boersma 45+8'	Report	Cvetković 62'; Bertaccini 71'	Attendance: 13,827; Referee: Erik Lambrechts

23 April 2026 4	Sint-Truiden	2–0	Anderlecht	Stayen
	Gotō 75'; Merlen 90+2'	Report		Referee: Simon Bourdeaud'hui

26 April 2026 5	Anderlecht	1–3	Union Saint-Gilloise	Constant Vanden Stock Stadium
	Cvetković 32'; Sardella (red card) 45+7'	Report	Zorgane 17', 25'; Smith 65'	Attendance: 16,458; Referee: Jasper Vergoote

3 May 2026 6	Anderlecht	1–3	Club Brugge	Constant Vanden Stock Stadium
	Cvetković 83'	Report	Angély 8' (o.g.); Forbs 59'; Tzolis 61'	Referee: Nicolas Laforge

10 May 2026 7	KAA Gent	1–1	Anderlecht	Planet Group Arena
	Duverne 44'	Report	Lopes 11' (o.g.); Cvetković (red card) 45+2'	Referee: Nathan Verboomen

17 May 2026 8	Anderlecht	2–2	K.V. Mechelen	Constant Vanden Stock Stadium
	Saliba 17'; Camara 90+1'	Report	van Brederode 15'; Koudou 60'	Referee: Jan Boterberg

21 May 2026 9	Anderlecht	3–1	Sint-Truiden	Constant Vanden Stock Stadium
	Sikan 20', 45+2'; Bertaccini 90+2'	Report	Sissako 77'	Referee: Nicolas Laforge

24 May 2026 10	Union Saint-Gilloise	5–1	Anderlecht	Joseph Marien Stadium
	Biondic 18'; Rodríguez 21'; El Hadj 32'; Khalaily 42'; Sykes 59'	Report	Hazard (red card) 47'; Kanaté 75'	Referee: Lawrence Visser

=== Belgian Cup ===
28 October 2025 Seventh round	Anderlecht	2–0	Ninove	Anderlecht
20:30 CET	Bertaccini 10'; Huerta 21'	Report		Stadium: Lotto Park

4 December 2025 Eighth round	Genk	1–3 (a.e.t.)	Anderlecht	Genk
20:30 CET	Karetsas 24'	Report	Bertaccini 82'; Hazard 107' (pen.); Kanaté 120+6'	Stadium: Cegeka Arena

15 January 2026 Quarter-finals	Anderlecht	1–0	Gent	Anderlecht
20:30 CET	Hazard 28'	Report		Stadium: Constant Vanden Stock Stadium

==== First and second leg ====
5 February 2026 Semi-finals	Anderlecht	0–1	Antwerp	Brussels
20:30 CET			Sardella 45+3' (o.g.)	Stadium: Constant Vanden Stock – Lotto Park

12 February 2026 Semi-finals	Antwerp	0–4	Anderlecht	Antwerp
20:30 CET			Saliba 2'; Degreef 45+4'; De Cat 48'; Scott 85' (o.g.)	Stadium: Bosuilstadion

==== Final ====
14 May 2026 Final	Union SG	3–1 (a.e.t.)	Anderlecht	King Baudouin Stadium, Brussels
15:00 CEST	Mac Allister 74'; Fuseini 95'; Rodríguez 100'		Cvetković 82'	Referee: Bram Van Driessche

=== UEFA Europa League ===
24 July 2025	Anderlecht	1–0	(Sweden) BK Häcken	Constant Vanden Stock Stadium, Brussels
20:00	Dolberg 35'	Report		Attendance: 12,291; Referee: Eldorjan Hamiti (Albania)

31 July 2025	BK Häcken (Sweden)	2–1 (a.e.t.) (4–2 p)	Anderlecht	Bravida Arena, Gothenburg
19:00	Svanbäck 33'; Gustafson 90+2' (pen.)	Report	Dolberg 54' (pen.)	Attendance: 4,016; Referee: Patrik Kolarić (Croatia)
	Penalties
	Gustafson (penalty scored); Layouni (penalty scored); Lundkvist (penalty scored); Berisha (penalty scored)		(penalty scored) Hazard; (penalty missed) Augustinsson; (penalty scored) Llansana; (penalty missed) Vázquez

== Statistics ==
No.	Pos	Nat	Player	Total		Pro League		Belgian Cup		UEFA Europa League	
No.	Pos	Nat	Player	Apps	Goals	Apps	Goals	Apps	Goals	Apps	Goals
Goalkeepers
16	GK	(Denmark) DEN	Mads Kikkenborg	0	0	0	0	0	0	0	0
26	GK	(Belgium) BEL	Colin Coosemans	0	0	0	0	0	0	0	0
63	GK	(Belgium) BEL	Timon Vanhoutte	0	0	0	0	0	0	0	0
Defenders
5	DF	(Senegal) SEN	Moussa N'Diaye	0	0	0	0	0	0	0	0
6	DF	(Sweden) SWE	Ludwig Augustinsson	0	0	0	0	0	0	0	0
25	DF	(Belgium) BEL	Thomas Foket	0	0	0	0	0	0	0	0
54	DF	(Belgium) BEL	Killian Sardella	0	0	0	0	0	0	0	0
55	DF	(Belgium) BEL	Marco Kana	0	0	0	0	0	0	0	0
Midfielders
10	MF	(Belgium) BEL	Yari Verschaeren	0	0	0	0	0	0	0	0
11	MF	(Belgium) BEL	Thorgan Hazard	0	0	0	0	0	0	0	0
18	MF	(Ghana) GHA	Majeed Ashimeru	0	0	0	0	0	0	0	0
23	MF	(Belgium) BEL	Mats Rits	0	0	0	0	0	0	0	0
29	MF	(Belgium) BEL	Mario Stroeykens	0	0	0	0	0	0	0	0
74	MF	(Belgium) BEL	Nathan De Cat	0	0	0	0	0	0	0	0
78	MF	(Morocco) MAR	Anas Tajaouart	0	0	0	0	0	0	0	0
83	MF	(Belgium) BEL	Tristan Degreef	0	0	0	0	0	0	0	0
Forwards
19	FW	(Ecuador) ECU	Nilson Angulo	0	0	0	0	0	0	0	0
20	FW	(Argentina) ARG	Luis Vázquez	0	0	0	0	0	0	0	0
Players transferred out during the season

Last updated: 22 September 2024
Source: Competitions
