= Timon Vanhoutte =

Belgian association football player (born 2004)

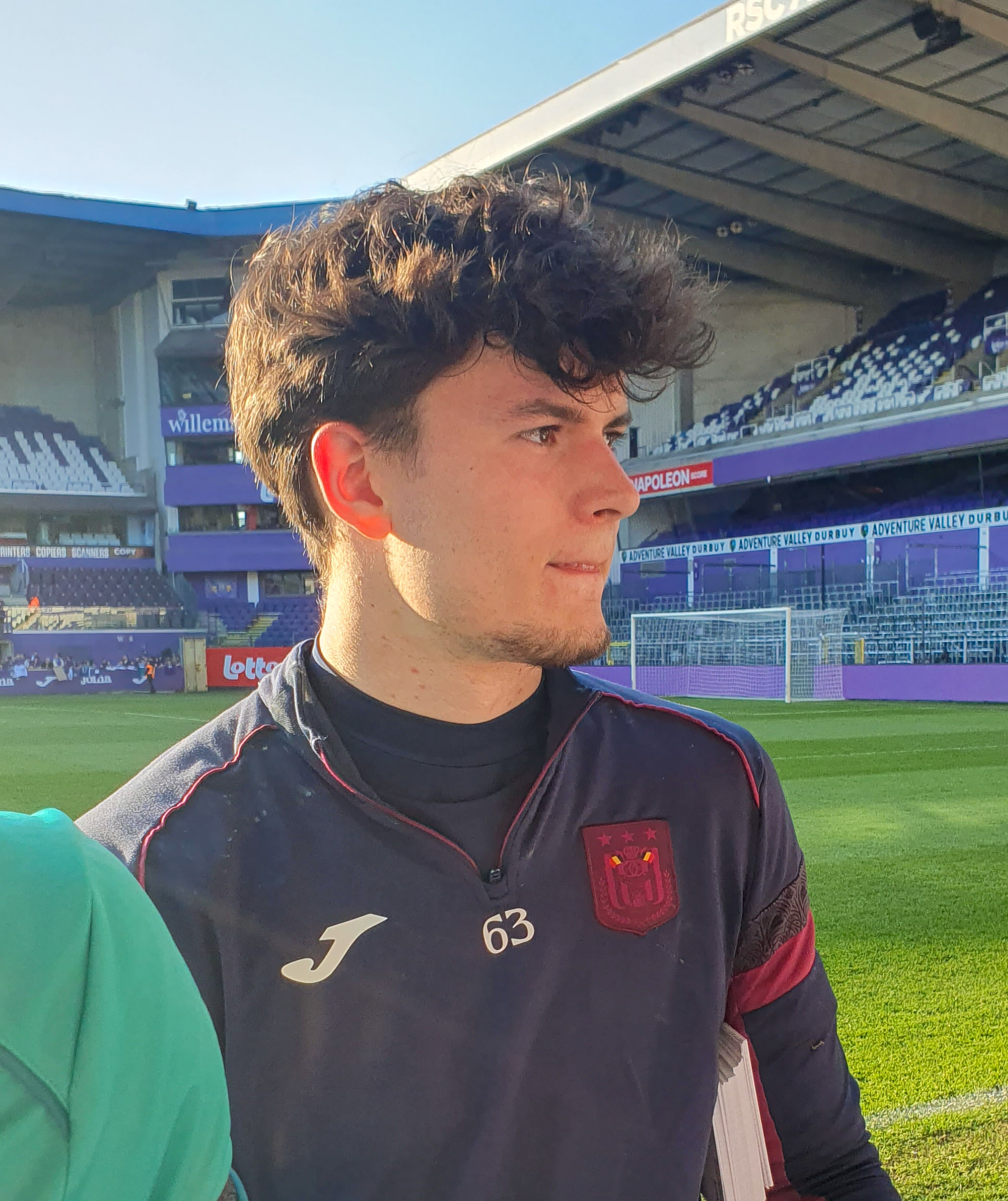

Personal information
- Full name: Timon Maurice Vanhoutte
- Date of birth: 29 January 2004 (age 22)
- Place of birth: Kortrijk, Belgium
- Height: 1.89 m (6 ft 2 1/2 in)
- Position: Goalkeeper

Team information
- Current team: RSCA Futures
- Number: 63

Youth career
- –2011: SV Kortrijk
- 2011-2014: Kortrijk
- 2014-2018: Club Brugge
- 2018–2022: Anderlecht

Senior career*
Years	Team	Apps	(Gls)
2022–	RSCA Futures	24	(0)
2022–2025	Anderlecht	0	(0)

International career
2019	Belgium U15	2	(0)
2019–2020	Belgium U16	5	(0)
2021–2022	Belgium U18	2	(0)
2021	Belgium U19	1	(0)
- * Club domestic league appearances and goals as of 21 August 2026

Timon Maurice Vanhoutte (born 29 January 2004) is a Belgian professional footballer who plays as a Goalkeeper for Challenger Pro League club RSCA Futures.

== Early life ==
He is from Kortrijk in the Flemish province of West Flanders. He was an outfield player as a youngster at SV Kortrijk but at the age of seven years-old he moved to KV Kortrijk, where he retrained as a goalkeeper. He was in the youth set-up at Club Brugge prior to joining RSC Anderlecht in 2018 at the age of 14 years-old. Whilst he was in the academy there he attended boarding school in Anderlecht at the Sint-Niklaas Institute.

== Club career ==
In September 2022, he signed a two-year professional contract with RSC Anderlecht. He made his debut for RSCA Futures against K Beerschot VA in the Challenger Pro League on 26 November 2022.

During the 2023–24 season, he became first-choice goalkeeper for RSCA Futures in the Challenger Pro League following the promotion of Bart Verbruggen to the Anderlecht first team. In April 2024, having overcome a knee injury which hampered his progress, he signed a new three-year contract with the club.

On the 31 October 2024, he was an unused substitute for the senior Anderlecht side in the Belgian Cup in a 4–0 away win over Royale Union Tubize-Braine.

== International career ==
He is a Belgium youth international. He played for the Belgium U18s against England, keeping a clean sheet in a 0–0 draw on 13 November 2021. He also featured in a 3–2 home win for the Belgium under-19 team against England in October 2021.
