= Yari Verschaeren =

Belgian footballer (born 2001)

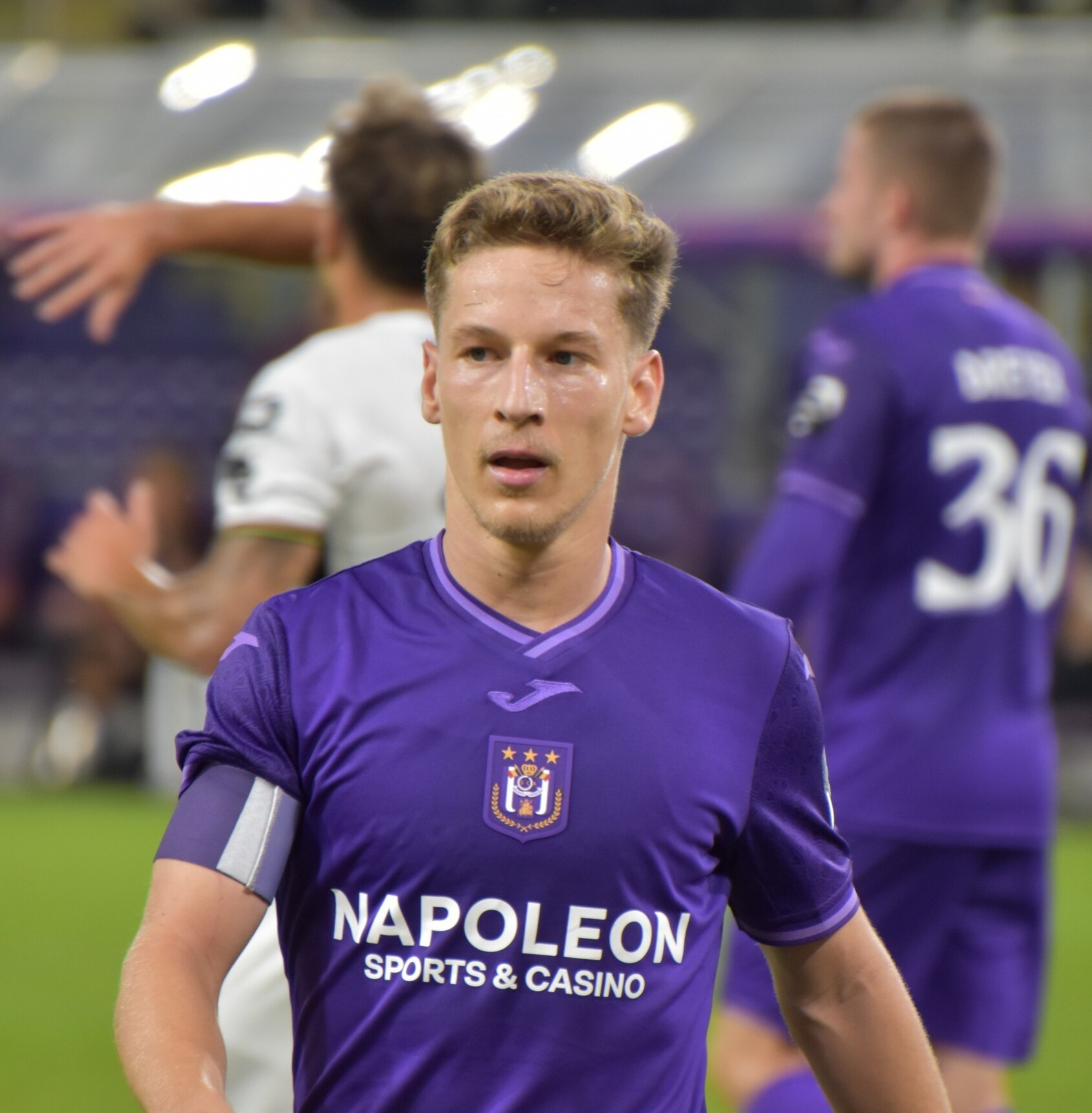
- Verschaeren playing for Anderlecht in 2024

Personal information
- Date of birth: 12 July 2001 (age 25)
- Place of birth: Sint-Niklaas, Belgium
- Height: 1.72 m (5 ft 8 in)
- Position: Attacking midfielder

Team information
- Current team: Sampdoria
- Number: 16

Youth career
- 2007–2008: KJB Kruibeke
- 2007–2010: Beveren
- 2010–2018: Anderlecht

Senior career*
| Years | Team | Apps | (Gls) |
| 2018–2026 | Anderlecht | 209 | (25) |
| 2026– | Sampdoria | 1 | (0) |

International career^{‡}
| 2016 | Belgium U16 | 7 | (1) |
| 2017–2018 | Belgium U17 | 10 | (1) |
| 2018 | Belgium U18 | 1 | (0) |
| 2019 | Belgium U19 | 1 | (0) |
| 2019–2022 | Belgium U21 | 10 | (2) |
| 2019–2022 | Belgium | 7 | (1) |
- * Club domestic league appearances and goals as of 23 August 2026 ‡ National team caps and goals as of 20:29, 1 October 2022 (UTC)

Yari Verschaeren (born 12 July 2001) is a Belgian professional footballer who plays as an attacking midfielder for Serie B club Sampdoria.

== Club career ==
Verschaeren is a youth product from Anderlecht, joining the club at the age of 9 from Beveren. In 2017, Verschaeren signed his first contract at Anderlecht.

Verschaeren made his first team debut on 25 November 2018 against Sint-Truiden, before being substituted after 78 minutes in the game, which was a 4–2 away defeat. Four days later, he made his debut in the Europa League against Spartak Trnava. He was substituted in the 81st minute. On 27 January 2019, he scored his first goal for Anderlecht against KAS Eupen. On 10 August 2024, Verschaeren made his 150th appearance for Anderlecht against OH Leuven, while wearing the captain's armband in absence of Jan Vertonghen.

On 12 August 2026, Serie B club Sampdoria announced the signing of Verschaeren, on a contract until 30 June 2029.

== International career ==
Verschaeren made his international debut for Belgium on 9 September 2019, coming on as a late substitute against Scotland in a Euro 2020 qualifier. A month later, he scored his first goal from a penalty, in Belgium's 9–0 win against San Marino.

== Career statistics ==
=== Club ===
As of match played 24 May 2026

Appearances and goals by club, season and competition
| Club | Season | League | | | Belgian Cup | | Europe | | Total | |
| Club | Season | Division | Apps | Goals | Apps | Goals | Apps | Goals | Apps | Goals |
|---|---|---|---|---|---|---|---|---|---|---|
| Anderlecht | 2018–19 | Belgian Pro League | 21 | 2 | 0 | 0 | 1 (Note: Appearance in UEFA Europa League) | 0 | 22 | 2 |
| Anderlecht | 2019–20 | Belgian Pro League | 21 | 2 | 1 | 0 | — | | 22 | 2 |
| Anderlecht | 2020–21 | Belgian Pro League | 22 | 6 | 1 | 0 | — | | 23 | 6 |
| Anderlecht | 2021–22 | Belgian Pro League | 36 | 7 | 5 | 0 | 4 (Note: Appearances in UEFA Europa Conference League) | 2 | 45 | 9 |
| Anderlecht | 2022–23 | Belgian Pro League | 28 | 2 | 1 | 0 | 13 | 2 | 42 | 4 |
| Anderlecht | 2023–24 | Belgian Pro League | 19 | 1 | 2 | 0 | — | | 21 | 1 |
| Anderlecht | 2024–25 | Belgian Pro League | 34 | 3 | 5 | 1 | 10 | 2 | 49 | 6 |
| Anderlecht | 2025–26 | Belgian Pro League | 28 | 1 | 6 | 0 | 4 (Note: Two appearances in UEFA Europa League, two appearances and one goal in UEFA Conference League) | 1 | 38 | 2 |
| Career total | | | 209 | 24 | 21 | 1 | 32 | 7 | 262 | 32 |

=== International ===
As of match played 29 March 2022

Appearances and goals by national team and year
| National team | Year | Apps | Goals |
|---|---|---|---|
| Belgium | 2019 | 3 | 1 |
| Belgium | 2020 | 3 | 0 |
| Belgium | 2022 | 1 | 0 |
| Total | | 7 | 1 |

Scores and results list Belgium's goal tally first, score column indicates score after each Verschaeren goal.

List of international goals scored by Yari Verschaeren
| No. | Date | Venue | Opponent | Score | Result | Competition |
|---|---|---|---|---|---|---|
| 1 | 10 October 2019 | King Baudouin Stadium, Brussels, Belgium | San Marino | 8–0 | 9–0 | UEFA Euro 2020 qualification |

== Honours ==
Anderlecht

- Belgian Cup runner-up: 2021–22, 2024–25

Individual

- Young Professional Footballer of the Season: 2018–19
- Anderlecht Player of the Season: 2018–19
- Dominique D'Onofrio Award: 2019
