= RSCA Futures =

Youth academy of RSC Anderlecht

- Full name: RSCA Futures
- Nicknames: Purple and white
- Short name: RSCA
- Founded: 14 August 2022; 4 years ago
- Ground: Constant Vanden Stock Stadium or King Baudouin Stadium
- Capacity: 22,500 or 50,093
- Owner: Anderlecht
- Chairman: Michael Verschueren
- Head coach: Karim Mokeddem
- League: Challenger Pro League
- 2025–26: Challenger Pro League, 14th of 17
- Website: rsca.be/en/news
| Home colours | Away colours |

RSCA Futures is the youth academy of Belgian club Anderlecht. The most senior team of RSCA Futures acts as Anderlecht's reserve team, and competes in the Challenger Pro League, the second flight of Belgian football.

== History ==
On 14 August 2022, Belgian Pro League side Anderlecht announced that they would be rebranding their youth academy to RSCA Futures.

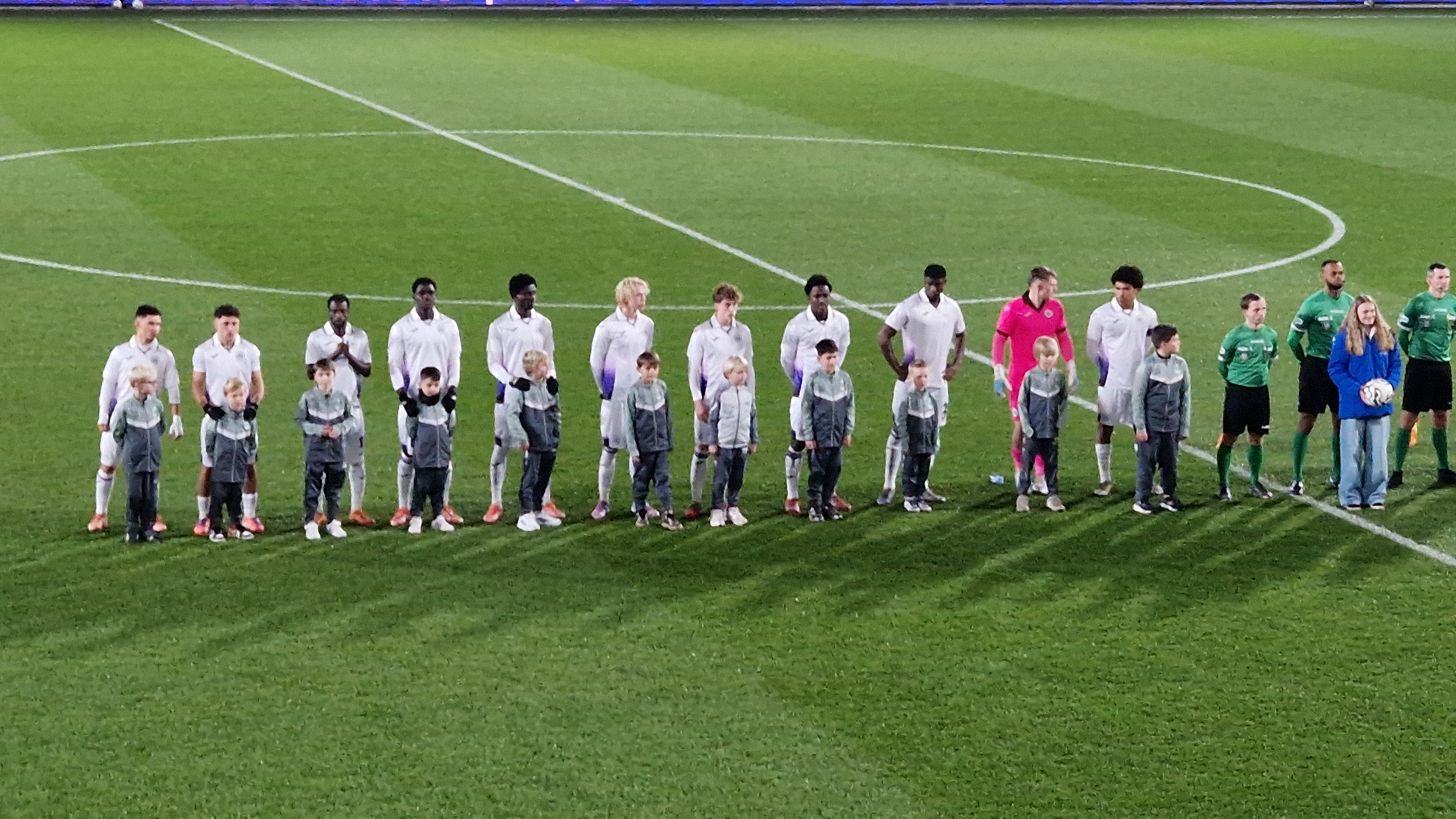
The RSCA Futures squad during the 2025-26 Challenger Pro League

== Players ==
=== First-team squad ===
As of 3 September 2026

Note: Flags indicate national team as defined under FIFA eligibility rules; some limited exceptions apply. Players may hold more than one non-FIFA nationality.

| No. | Pos. | Nation | Player |
|---|---|---|---|
| 2 | DF | GER | Zoumana Keita |
| 22 | FW | MAR | Elyess Dao |
| 25 | DF | BEL | Thomas Foket |
| 28 | MF | FRA | Enzo Sternal |
| 31 | DF | SEN | Cheikh Koité |
| 33 | GK | BEL | Mattis Seghers |
| 40 | MF | BEL | Adjani Mujangi Bia |
| 41 | DF | BEL | Joël Putu Matadi |
| 42 | FW | MAR | Rami Lougmani |
| 44 | MF | MAR | Mohamed Abdellaoui |
| 45 | MF | COD | Joël Kana |
| 46 | DF | BEL | Kylian Liema Olinga |
| 48 | MF | BEL | Ilyas Benktib |
| 49 | FW | BEL | Jayden Onia Seke |
| 51 | MF | SEN | Omar Sarr |
| 52 | MF | BEL | Gorak Ghale |
| 56 | DF | MAR | Amine Mahroug |

| No. | Pos. | Nation | Player |
|---|---|---|---|
| 57 | FW | GUI | Gassimou Sylla |
| 58 | DF | BEL | Milan Debast |
| 61 | MF | BEL | Joshua Nga Kana |
| 63 | GK | BEL | Timon Vanhoutte |
| 64 | MF | BEL | Alexander De Ridder |
| 65 | DF | COD | Ludovick Wola-Wetshay |
| 66 | GK | BEL | Michiel Haentjens |
| 68 | MF | BEL | Noah Kalonji |
| 70 | MF | FRA | Alexis Flips |
| 71 | DF | BEL | Nunzio Engwanda |
| 72 | DF | NGR | Babatunde Akomolede |
| 76 | FW | BEL | Terry Van De Ven |
| 77 | GK | BEL | Daan Gilis |
| 86 | GK | BEL | Lander Gijsbers |
| 90 | FW | SEN | Pape Aliya N'dao (on loan from Young African Promises) |
| 94 | FW | ALG | Willsem Boussaid |
| 96 | GK | BEL | Kamiel Timmermans |

== See also ==
- Anderlecht
