= 2023–24 RSC Anderlecht season =

R.S.C. Anderlecht
2023–24 season
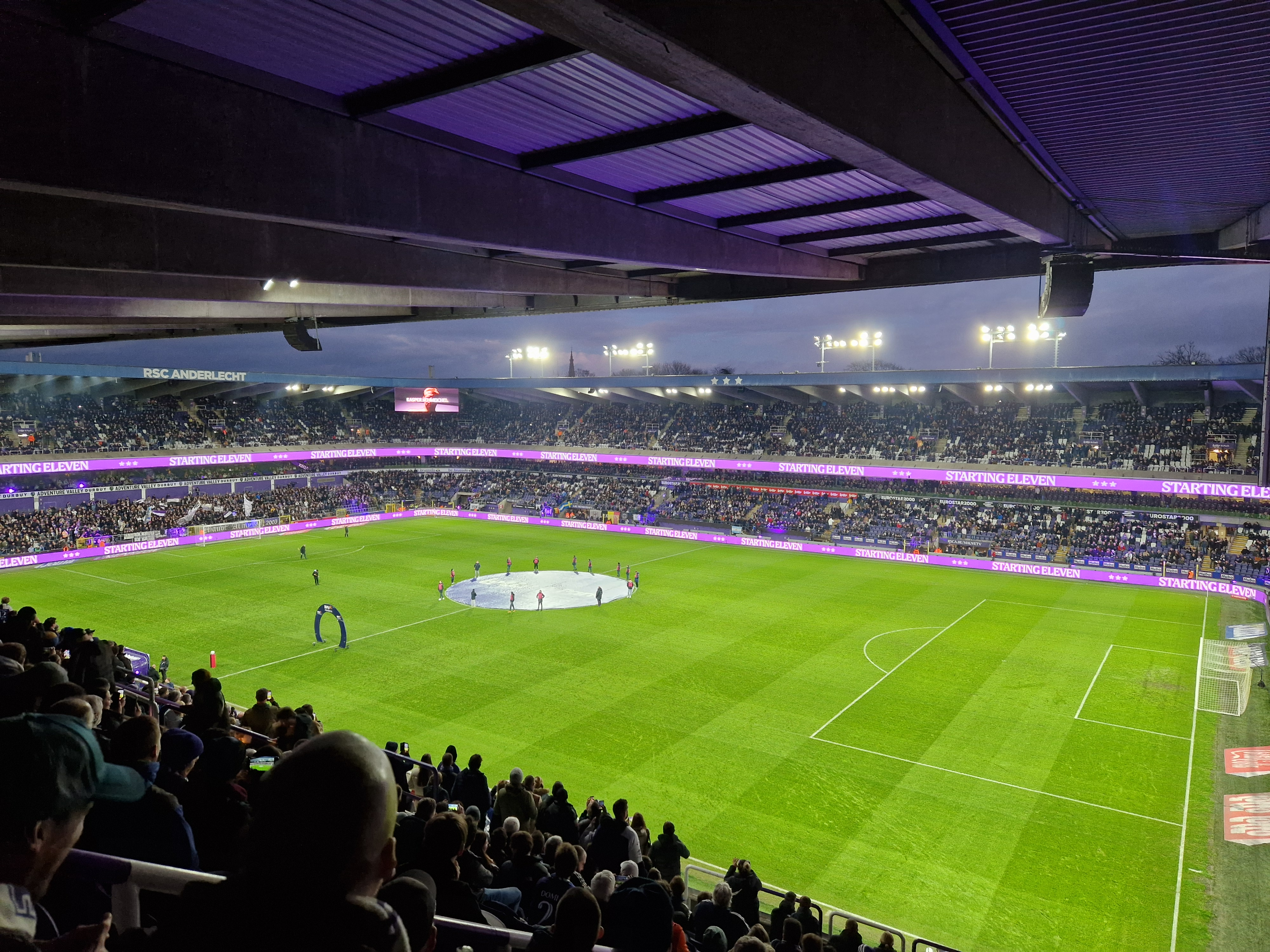
- Home game against Sint-Truiden, February 2024
- Chairman: Wouter Vandenhaute
- Manager: Brian Riemer
- Stadium: Lotto Park
- Champions' Play-offs: 3rd
- Belgian Pro League Regular season: 2nd
- Belgian Cup: Quarter-finals
- Top goalscorer: League: Anders Dreyer (15); All: Anders Dreyer (17)
- Average home league attendance: 19,816
Home colours	Away colours	Third colours

The 2023–24 season was Royal Sporting Club Anderlecht's 116th season in existence and 88th consecutive in the Belgian Pro League. They also competed in the Belgian Cup, where they were eliminated in the quarter-finals.

== Players ==
=== First-team squad ===
As of 6 February 2024

Note: Flags indicate national team as defined under FIFA eligibility rules; some limited exceptions apply. Players may hold more than one non-FIFA nationality.

No.	Pos.	Nation	Player
1	GK	DEN	Kasper Schmeichel
5	DF	SEN	Moussa N'Diaye
7	MF	BEL	Francis Amuzu
10	MF	BEL	Yari Verschaeren
11	FW	BEL	Thorgan Hazard
12	FW	DEN	Kasper Dolberg
14	DF	BEL	Jan Vertonghen (captain)
15	DF	SWE	Ludwig Augustinsson (on loan from Sevilla)
16	GK	DEN	Mads Kikkenborg
17	MF	BEL	Théo Leoni
18	MF	GHA	Majeed Ashimeru
20	FW	ARG	Luis Vázquez
21	MF	GUI	Amadou Diawara

No.	Pos.	Nation	Player
22	DF	BEL	Louis Patris
23	MF	BEL	Mats Rits
25	MF	DEN	Thomas Delaney (on loan from Sevilla)
26	GK	BEL	Colin Coosemans
29	FW	BEL	Mario Stroeykens
32	FW	ECU	Nilson Angulo
33	DF	ARG	Federico Gattoni (on loan from Sevilla)
36	MF	DEN	Anders Dreyer
54	DF	BEL	Killian Sardella
56	DF	BEL	Zeno Debast
61	MF	NOR	Kristian Arnstad
63	GK	BEL	Timon Vanhoutte

=== Other players under contract ===
Note: Flags indicate national team as defined under FIFA eligibility rules; some limited exceptions apply. Players may hold more than one non-FIFA nationality.

No.	Pos.	Nation	Player
—	FW	BEL	Antoine Colassin

=== Out on loan ===
Note: Flags indicate national team as defined under FIFA eligibility rules; some limited exceptions apply. Players may hold more than one non-FIFA nationality.

No.	Pos.	Nation	Player
—	DF	BEL	Marco Kana (at Kortrijk until 30 June 2024)
—	MF	NGR	Ishaq Abdulrazak (at Häcken until 30 June 2024)

No.	Pos.	Nation	Player
—	MF	FRA	Alexis Flips (at Ankaragücü until 30 June 2024)

== Transfers ==
=== In ===
Pos.	Player	Transferred from	Fee	Date	Source
FW	(Denmark) Kasper Dolberg	(France) Nice	Free	7 July 2023	
DF	(Belgium) Louis Patris	(Belgium) OH Leuven	€3,500,000	8 July 2023	
GK	(France) Maxime Dupé	(France) Toulouse	Free	18 July 2023	
MF	(Netherlands) Justin Lonwijk	(Ukraine) Dynamo Kiev	Loan	25 July 2023	
FW	(Argentina) Luis Vázquez	(Argentina) Boca Juniors	€4,500,000	26 July 2023	
MF	(England) Tudor Mendel-Idowu	(England) Chelsea	Free	27 July 2023	
MF	(France) Alexis Flips	(France) Reims	€3,500,000	8 August 2023	
MF	(Belgium) Mats Rits	(Belgium) Club Brugge	€2,000,000	15 August 2023	
DF	(Sweden) Ludwig Augustinsson	(Spain) Sevilla	Loan	16 August 2023	
MF	(Denmark) Thomas Delaney	(Spain) Sevilla	Loan	22 August 2023	
GK	(Denmark) Kasper Schmeichel	(France) Nice	Free	5 September 2023	
MF	(Belgium) Thorgan Hazard	(Germany) Borussia Dortmund	Undisclosed	6 September 2023	
DF	(Argentina) Federico Gattoni	(Spain) Sevilla	Loan	30 January 2024	

=== Out ===
Pos.	Player	Transferred to	Fee	Date	Source
FW	(Ghana) Mohammed Dauda	(Spain) Tenerife	Undisclosed	24 May 2023	
GK	(Germany) Timon Wellenreuther	(Netherlands) Feyenoord	Undisclosed	2 June 2023	
MF	(Israel) Lior Refaelov	(Israel) Maccabi Haifa	Free	15 June 2023	
MF	(Sweden) Kristoffer Olsson	(Denmark) Midtjylland	Undisclosed	3 July 2023	
GK	(Netherlands) Bart Verbruggen	(England) Brighton & Hove Albion	€20,000,000	4 July 2023	
DF	(Belgium) Hendrik Van Crombrugge	(Belgium) Genk	€1,300,000	18 July 2023	
DF	(Ukraine) Bogdan Mykhaylichenko	(Croatia) Dinamo Zagreb	Free	24 July 2023	
DF	(Belgium) Noah Sadiki	(Belgium) Union SG	€1,400,000	27 July 2023	
FW	(Belgium) Lucas Stassin	(Belgium) Westerlo	€1,500,000	27 July 2023	
DF	(Belgium) Hannes Delcroix	(England) Burnley	Undisclosed	22 August 2023	
DF	(Panama) Michael Amir Murillo	(France) Marseille	Undisclosed	30 August 2023	
FW	(Sierra Leone) Mustapha Bundu	(England) Plymouth Argyle	Undisclosed	1 September 2023	

== Pre-season and friendlies ==
Win Draw Loss Fixtures

24 June 2023 Friendly	Oudenaarde (Belgium)	0–5	(Belgium) Anderlecht	Oudenaarde
19:30 UTC+2				Stadium: Burgemeester Thienpontstadion

1 July 2023 Friendly	Anderlecht (Belgium)	5–2	(Romania) FCSB
13:00 UTC+1

7 July 2023 Friendly	Anderlecht (Belgium)	3–1	(Croatia) Lokomotiva Zagreb	Brussels
13:00 UTC+2				Stadium: Complexe Sportif Neerpede - Terrein 6

14 July 2023 Friendly	Anderlecht (Belgium)	0–6	(Czech Republic) Sparta Prague
16:00 UTC+2
Note: Three periods of 45 minutes.

22 July 2023 Friendly	Anderlecht (Belgium)	3–0	(Netherlands) Ajax	Brussels
13:30 UTC+2	Dolberg 12'; Aertssen 80' (o.g.); Raman 90+4'			Stadium: Lotto Park

12 January 2024 Friendly	Anderlecht (Belgium)	0–0	(Libya) Al Ahli
15:00 UTC+1

== Competitions ==
=== Overall record ===
Competition	First match	Last match	Starting round	Final position	Record							
Competition	First match	Last match	Starting round	Final position	Pld	W	D	L	GF	GA	GD	Win %
Belgian Pro League Regular season	28 July 2023	16 March 2024	Matchday 1	2nd	30	18	9	3	58	30	+28	60.00
Champions' Play-offs	1 April 2024	26 May 2024	Matchday 1		9	4	2	3	11	9	+2	44.44
Belgian Cup	30 October 2023	25 January 2024	Seventh round	Quarter-finals	3	2	0	1	4	2	+2	66.67
Total					42	24	11	7	73	41	+32	57.14

Last updated: 19 May 2024
Source: Soccerway

=== Belgian Pro League ===
==== Regular season ====
Pos	Team	Pld	W	D	L	GF	GA	GD	Pts	Qualification or relegation
1	Union SG	30	21	7	2	63	31	+32	70	Qualification for the Europa League and champions' play-offs (Note: The regular season winner qualified for the 2024–25 UEFA Europa League if not earning 2024–25 UEFA Champions League in the play-off.)
2	Anderlecht	30	18	9	3	58	30	+28	63	Qualification for the champions' play-offs
3	Antwerp	30	14	10	6	55	27	+28	52	Qualification for the champions' play-offs
4	Club Brugge	30	14	9	7	62	29	+33	51	Qualification for the champions' play-offs
5	Cercle Brugge	30	14	5	11	44	34	+10	47	Qualification for the champions' play-offs

Source: Jupiler Pro League (in Dutch), Soccerway
Rules for classification: 1) Points; 2) Matches won; 3) Goal difference; 4) Goals scored; 5) Away matches won; 6) Away goal difference; 7) Away goals scored; 8) Play-off.

==== Results summary ====
Overall								Home						Away					
Pld	W	D	L	GF	GA	GD	Pts	W	D	L	GF	GA	GD	W	D	L	GF	GA	GD
30	18	9	3	58	30	+28	63	11	3	1	30	13	+17	7	6	2	28	17	+11

Source: Worldfootball

==== Results by round ====
Round	1	2	3	4	5	6	7	8	9	10	11	12	13	14	15	16	17	18	19	20	21	22	23	24	25	26	27	28	29	30
Ground	A	H	A	H	H	A	A	H	A	H	A	H	A	A	H	A	H	A	H	H	A	H	A	H	A	H	A	H	A	H
Result	L	W	W	W	W	D	D	D	W	W	L	W	W	D	W	W	D	D	W	W	D	D	D	W	W	W	W	W	W	L
Position	15	8	6	4	2	3	2	3	3	2	2	2	2	2	2	2	2	2	2	2	2	2	2	2	2	2	2	2	2	2

Source: Worldfootball
A = Away; H = Home; W = Win; D = Draw; L = Loss

==== Matches ====
The league fixtures were unveiled on 22 June 2023.

28 July 2023 1	Union Saint-Gilloise	2–0	Anderlecht	Brussels
20:45 CEST (UTC+2)	Burgess (yellow card) 17'; Rasmussen (yellow card) 27'; Eckert 30'; Vanhoutte (yellow card) 54'; Nilsson (yellow card) 83'; Mac Allister (yellow card) 85'; Puertas 90+8' (pen.)	Report	Sardella (yellow card) 75'; Vertonghen (yellow card) 83'; Leoni (yellow card) 87'	Stadium: Joseph Marien Stadium; Attendance: 6,912; Referee: Bram Van Driessche

6 August 2023 2	Anderlecht	1–0	Antwerp	Brussels
13:30 CEST (UTC+2)	Dolberg 45+5' (pen.); Patris (yellow card) 90+2'	Report	Balikwisha (yellow card) 38'	Stadium: Lotto Park; Attendance: 15,068; Referee: Jasper Vergoote

13 August 2023 3	Sint Truiden	0–1	Anderlecht	Sint-Truiden
19:30 CEST (UTC+2)	Van Helden (yellow card) 19'; Koita (yellow card) 60'; Delorge-Knieper (yellow card) 86'; Barnes (yellow card) 90+6'	Report	Stroeykens (yellow card) 21'; N'Diaye 53'; Dreyer (red card) 56'; Arnstad (yellow card) 68'; N'Diaye (yellow card) 82'; Leoni (yellow card) 84'; Patris (yellow card) 90+3'	Stadium: Stayen; Attendance: 8,365; Referee: Lawrence Visser

20 August 2023 4	Anderlecht	2–1	Westerlo	Brussels
13:30 CEST (UTC+2)	Dolberg 1'; Diawara (yellow card) 45+2'; Vertonghen 72'	Report	Fixelles (yellow card) 52'; Madsen (yellow card) 74'; Jordanov 81', (yellow card) 87'	Stadium: Lotto Park; Attendance: 14,903; Referee: Jonathan Lardot

27 August 2023 5	Anderlecht	2–1	Charleroi	Brussels
18:30 CEST (UTC+2)	Leoni 34'; Amuzu 78'	Report	Rogelj (yellow card) 32'; Andreou 76'; Heymans (yellow card) 87'	Stadium: Lotto Park; Attendance: 16,082; Referee: Lothar D'hondt

3 September 2023 6	Genk	1–1	Anderlecht	Genk
18:30 CEST (UTC+2)	Bonsu Baah (red card) 9'; Muñoz (yellow card) 86'; Arteaga (yellow card) 89'; Arokodare 90+7'	Report	Vertonghen (yellow card) 9'; Delaney (yellow card) 24'; Debast (yellow card) 32'; Flips (yellow card) 49'; Rits (yellow card) 54'; Amuzu 71'; Vázquez (yellow card) 89'	Stadium: Cegeka Arena; Attendance: 20,655; Referee: Bram Van Driessche

17 September 2023 7	Kortrijk	2–2	Anderlecht	Kortrijk
16:00 CEST (UTC+2)	De Neve 19'; Kana (yellow card) 33' (yellow-red card) 81'; Avenatti (yellow card) 41', (goal) 57' (pen.); Audoor (yellow card) 71'; Mehssatou (yellow card) 85'	Report	Dolberg 20'; Debast (red card) 54'; Hazard (yellow card) 90+5'; Dreyer 90+7'	Stadium: Guldensporen Stadion; Referee: Kevin Van Damme

24 September 2023 8	Anderlecht	1–1	Club Brugge	Anderlecht
18:30 CEST (UTC+2)	Dolberg 40'	Report	Vetlesen (yellow card) 13'; Olsen 64'	Stadium: Constant Vanden Stock Stadium; Referee: Lawrence Visser

30 September 2023 9	Eupen	1–3	Anderlecht	Eupen
16:00 CEST (UTC+2)	Christie-Davies (yellow card) 36'; Nuhu 38' (Finnbogason)		Dreyer 1' (Leoni); Paeshuyse 67' (o.g.); Vázquez 88' (Leoni)	Stadium: Kehrwegstadion

7 October 2023 10	Anderlecht	3–1	Mechelen	Brussels
20:45 CEST (UTC+2)	Stroeykens 14' (Hazard); Leoni (yellow card) 58'; Dolberg 60' (Augustinsson); Sardella (yellow card) 69'; Amuzu 90+3' (Vázquez)		Schoofs (yellow card) 27'; Storm 73' (without assist); Bates (yellow card) 77'; Mrabti (yellow card) 83'	Stadium: Lotto Park

22 October 2023 11	Standard Liège	3–2	Anderlecht	Liège
18:30 CEST (UTC+2)	Ngoy (yellow card) 50', (goal) 61' (without assist); Alzate 52' (without assist); Kawabe 55' (Fossey); Price (yellow card) 90+6'		Dolberg 18' (Hazard); Dreyer 24' (Rits); Hazard (yellow card) 60'; Debast (yellow card) 90+1'; Schmeichel (yellow card) 90+22'	Stadium: Stade Maurice Dufrasne

28 October 2023 12	Anderlecht	5–1	OH Leuven	Brussels
20:45 CEST (UTC+2)				Stadium: Lotto Park

5 November 2023 13	Cercle Brugge	0–3	Anderlecht	Brugge
13:30 CET (UTC+1)				Stadium: Jan Breydel Stadium

12 November 2023 14	Gent	1–1	Anderlecht	Ghent
18:30 CET (UTC+1)				Stadium: Ghelamco Arena

26 November 2023 15	Anderlecht	2–1	RWDM	Brussels
18:30 CET (UTC+1)				Stadium: Constant Vanden Stock Stadium

1 December 2023 16	Westerlo	1–3	Anderlecht	Westerlo
20:45 CET (UTC+1)				Stadium: Het Kuipje

23 December 2023 19	Anderlecht	2–1	Genk	Brussels
CET (UTC+1)				Stadium: Lotto Park

27 December 2023 20	Anderlecht	2–0	Cercle Brugge	Brussels
CET (UTC+1)				Stadium: Lotto Park

28 January 2024 22	Anderlecht	2–2	Union Saint-Gilloise	Brussels
CET (UTC+1)				Stadium: Lotto Park

4 February 2024 24	Anderlecht	1–0	Gent	Brussels
CET (UTC+1)				Stadium: Lotto Park

18 February 2024 26	Anderlecht	4–1	Sint-Truiden	Brussels
CET (UTC+1)				Stadium: Lotto Park

3 March 2024 28	Anderlecht	1–0	Eupen	Brussels
CET (UTC+1)				Stadium: Lotto Park

16 March 2024 30	Anderlecht	0–1	Kortrijk	Brussels
CET (UTC+1)				Stadium: Lotto Park

==== Champions' Play-offs ====
Pos	Team	Pld	W	D	L	GF	GA	GD	Pts	Qualification or relegation	CLU	USG	AND	CER	GNK	ANT
1	Club Brugge (C)	10	7	3	0	21	6	+15	50	Qualification for the Champions League league stage	—	2–2	3–1	0–0	4–0	3–0
2	Union SG	10	4	2	4	17	12	+5	49	Qualification for the Champions League third qualifying round	1–2	—	0–0	2–3	2–0	4–1
3	Anderlecht	10	4	2	4	12	12	0	46	Qualification for the Europa League play-off round	0–1	2–1	—	3–0	2–1	1–0
4	Cercle Brugge	10	3	4	3	13	13	0	37	Qualification for the Europa League second qualifying round (Note: Union SG qualified for the Europa League play-off round by winning the 2023–24 Belgian Cup. The Europa League second qualifying spot and the European competition play-off spot were thus passed to the next two highest-placed teams that did not qualify for European competitions.)	1–1	1–2	1–1	—	4–1	0–1
5	Genk	10	4	1	5	8	17	−9	37	Qualification for the European competition play-off	0–3	1–0	2–1	1–1	—	1–0
6	Antwerp	10	2	0	8	7	18	−11	32		1–2	0–3	3–1	1–2	0–1	—

Source: Jupiler Pro League (in Dutch), Soccerway
Legend: Blue = home team win; Yellow = draw; Red = away team win.
Rules for classification: 1) Points; 2) Points without (possible) half points added due to rounding; 3) Regular season finishing position.
(C) Champions

==== Results summary ====
Overall								Home						Away					
Pld	W	D	L	GF	GA	GD	Pts	W	D	L	GF	GA	GD	W	D	L	GF	GA	GD
9	4	2	3	11	9	+2	14	4	0	1	8	3	+5	0	2	2	3	6	−3

Last updated: 19 May 2024.
Source: Worldfootball

==== Results by round ====
Round	1	2	3	4	5	6	7	8	9	10
Ground	H	A	H	A	H	A	A	H	H	A
Result	W	L	W	L	W	D	D	W	L	L
Position	2	2	1	1	1	1	2	1		

Source: Worldfootball
A = Away; H = Home; W = Win; D = Draw; L = Loss

==== Matches ====
30 March 2024 1	Anderlecht	1–0	Antwerp	Brussels
20:45 CET (UTC+1)	Sardella 52'	Report	Wijndal (red card) 43'	Stadium: Lotto Park; Referee: Jasper Vergoote

7 April 2024 2	Club Brugge	3–1	Anderlecht	Bruges
18:30 CEST (UTC+2)	Mechele 3'; Onyedika 61', 89'	Report	Dreyer 90+1'	Stadium: Jan Breydel Stadium; Attendance: 24,166; Referee: Jonathan Lardot

14 April 2024 3	Anderlecht	2–1	Union Saint-Gilloise	Brussels
18:30 CEST (UTC+2)	Dolberg 11'; Debast (yellow card) 29' (yellow-red card) 64'; Amuzu 76'	Report	Puertas 66' (pen.)	Stadium: Lotto Park; Referee: Erik Lambrechts

20 April 2024 4	Genk	2–1	Anderlecht	Genk
20:45 CEST (UTC+2)	Arokodare 14'; Zeqiri 90+1' (pen.)	Report	Dreyer 75'	Stadium: Cegeka Arena; Referee: Jonathan Lardot

24 April 2024 5	Anderlecht	3–0	Cercle Brugge	Brussels
20:30 CEST (UTC+2)	Leoni 31', 56'; Dreyer 33'	Report		Stadium: Lotto Park; Referee: Bram Van Driessche

28 April 2024 6	Cercle Brugge	1–1	Anderlecht	Bruges
16:00 CEST (UTC+2)	Daland 51'	Report	Stroeykens 11'	Stadium: Jan Breydel Stadium; Referee: Erik Lambrechts

5 May 2024 7	Union Saint-Gilloise	0–0	Anderlecht	Brussels
18:30 CEST (UTC+2)		Report		Stadium: Joseph Marien Stadium; Referee: Bram Van Driessche

11 May 2024 8	Anderlecht	2–1	Genk	Brussels
20:45 CEST (UTC+2)	Verschaeren 44'; Dolberg 70'	Report	Arokodare 75'	Stadium: Lotto Park; Referee: Lawrence Bisser

19 May 2024 9	Anderlecht	0–1	Club Brugge	Anderlecht
18:30 CEST (UTC+2)		Report	Odoi 29'	Stadium: Lotto Park; Referee: Erik Lambrechts

26 May 2024 10	Antwerp	3–1	Anderlecht	Antwerp
18:30 CEST (UTC+2)		Report		Stadium: Bosuilstadion

=== Belgian Cup ===
31 October 2023 Seveenth round	RAAL La Louvière	0–1	Anderlecht	La Louvière
20:30 CET (UTC+1)		Report	Raman 19'	Stadium: Stade Communal du Tivoli; Referee: Matonga Simonini

7 December 2023 Round of 16	Anderlecht	2–0	Standard Liège	Brussels
CET (UTC+1)		Report		Stadium: Lotto Park

25 January 2024 Quarter-finals	Union Saint-Gilloise	2–1	Anderlecht	Brussels
20:30 CET (UTC+1)	Lapoussin 26', (yellow card) 90+9'; Mac Allister (red card) 32'; Burgess (yellow card) 53'; Rodríguez 62' (pen.); Moris (yellow card) 90+10'	Report	Leoni (yellow card) 24'; Rits (yellow card) 53'; Dreyer 90+4'	Stadium: Joseph Marien Stadium; Referee: Lothar D'hondt
