= Killian Sardella =

Belgian footballer (born 2002)

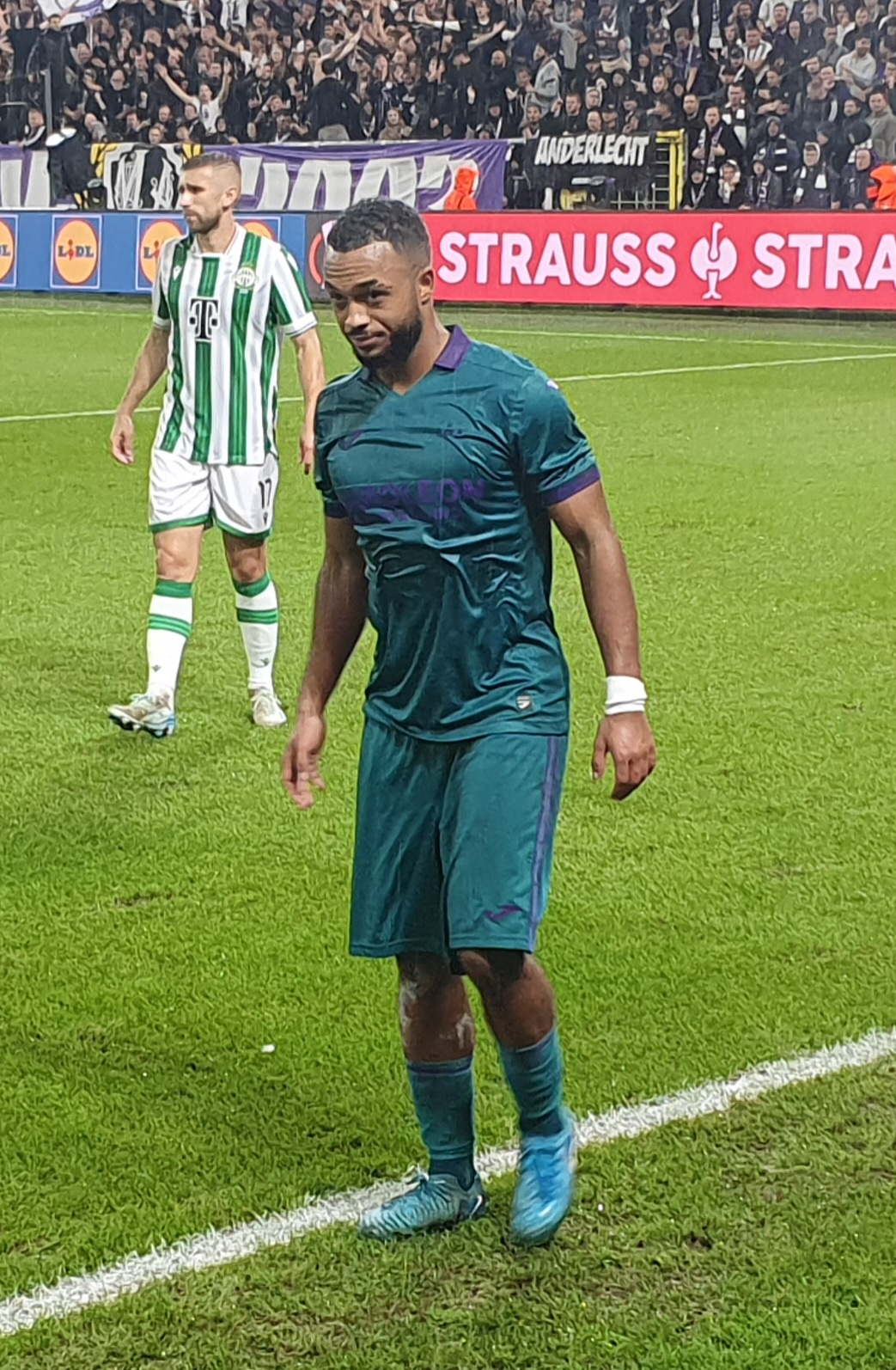
- Sardella with Anderlecht in 2024

Personal information
- Full name: Killian Francis B Sardella
- Date of birth: 2 May 2002 (age 24)
- Place of birth: Duffel, Belgium
- Height: 1.74 m (5 ft 9 in)
- Position: Right-back

Team information
- Current team: Anderlecht
- Number: 54

Youth career
- –2019: Anderlecht

Senior career*
Years	Team	Apps	(Gls)
2019–	Anderlecht	145	(1)
2022	RSCA Futures	3	(3)

International career^{‡}
2017	Belgium U15	5	(0)
2017	Belgium U16	4	(0)
2017–2019	Belgium U17	22	(0)
2020	Belgium U19	1	(0)
2019–2024	Belgium U21	15	(2)
2024–	Belgium	1	(0)
- * Club domestic league appearances and goals as of 18:01, 24 May 2026 (UTC) ‡ National team caps and goals as of 22:40, 17 November 2024 (UTC)

Killian Francis B Sardella (born 2 May 2002) is a Belgian professional footballer who plays as a right-back for Belgian Pro League club Anderlecht and the Belgium national team.

== Club career ==
Sardella went through the youth system at KVK Wemmel and FC Brussels before moving to RSC Anderlecht. At FC Brussels he played together with Anouar Ait El Hadj, who he would later play alongside in the Anderlecht first team. In the summer of 2019, Mauves coach Vincent Kompany transferred him to the Anderlecht first team, with Sardella making his debut in the Brussels side's third league game of the 2019–20 season in a 0–0 draw against KV Mechelen as a starter. Sardella played the entire match. After his first season with the first team, in which he played 20 matches in all competitions, Anderlecht extended his contract until 2025.

In his second season, he started eight games in a row from mid-December to late January, at the expense of more experienced players such as Bohdan Mykhaylychenko and Michael Amir Murillo. Coach Vincent Kompany played Sardella, who played as a controlling midfielder in the youth team and later as a central defender, mainly as a wing defender that season. He was only posted in the centre of defence again in his last three games of the season.

In the 2021–22 season, Sardella, just like the season before, made a mistake on the opening match day: against Union Saint-Gilloise, he misjudged a cross-field pass from Jonas Bager to Loïc Lapoussin, allowing the latter to offer Deniz Undav the opening goal. Sardella was then taken to task by (part of) the Anderlecht crowd and was substituted by Michael Amir Murillo during half-time. Sardella was given two more starting places against KF Laçi in the UEFA Europa Conference League shortly afterwards, but in the league he had to wait a while for another chance. On 30 March 2024, Sardella scored for the first time in his career in the top flight for the only goal in a 1–0 win over defending champions Royal Antwerp in the title play-offs. Anderlecht would finish the season in third, as they had also done in 2020–21.

== International career ==
Sardella was the captain for Belgium U17 at the 2019 UEFA European Under-17 Championship held in Ireland. Belgium were knocked out at the quarter-finals stage by the Netherlands 3–0 in Bray.

Sardella made his debut for the Belgium senior team on 17 November 2024, as he was subbed on in the 93rd minute in a UEFA Nations League group stage match against Israel, which ended 1–0 in favour of the latter.

== Personal life ==
Sardella was born in Belgium to an Italian father and Congolese mother.

== Career statistics ==
=== Club ===
As of match played 24 May 2026

Appearances and goals by club, season and competition
Club	Season	League			Belgian Cup		Europe		Other		Total	
Club	Season	Division	Apps	Goals	Apps	Goals	Apps	Goals	Apps	Goals	Apps	Goals
Anderlecht	2019–20	Belgian Pro League	18	0	2	0	—		—		20	0
Anderlecht	2020–21	Belgian Pro League	16	0	1	0	—		—		17	0
Anderlecht	2021–22	Belgian Pro League	5	0	1	0	2 (Note: Appearances in UEFA Europa Conference League)	0	—		8	0
Anderlecht	2022–23	Belgian Pro League	16	0	—		6	0	—		22	0
Anderlecht	2023–24	Belgian Pro League	34	1	2	0	—		—		36	1
Anderlecht	2024–25	Belgian Pro League	24	0	4	0	10 (Note: Appearances in UEFA Europa League)	0	—		38	0
Anderlecht	2025–26	Belgian Pro League	32	0	5	0	0	0	—		37	0
Career total			145	1	15	0	18	0	0	0	178	1
