= Kristian Arnstad =

Norwegian footballer (born 2003)

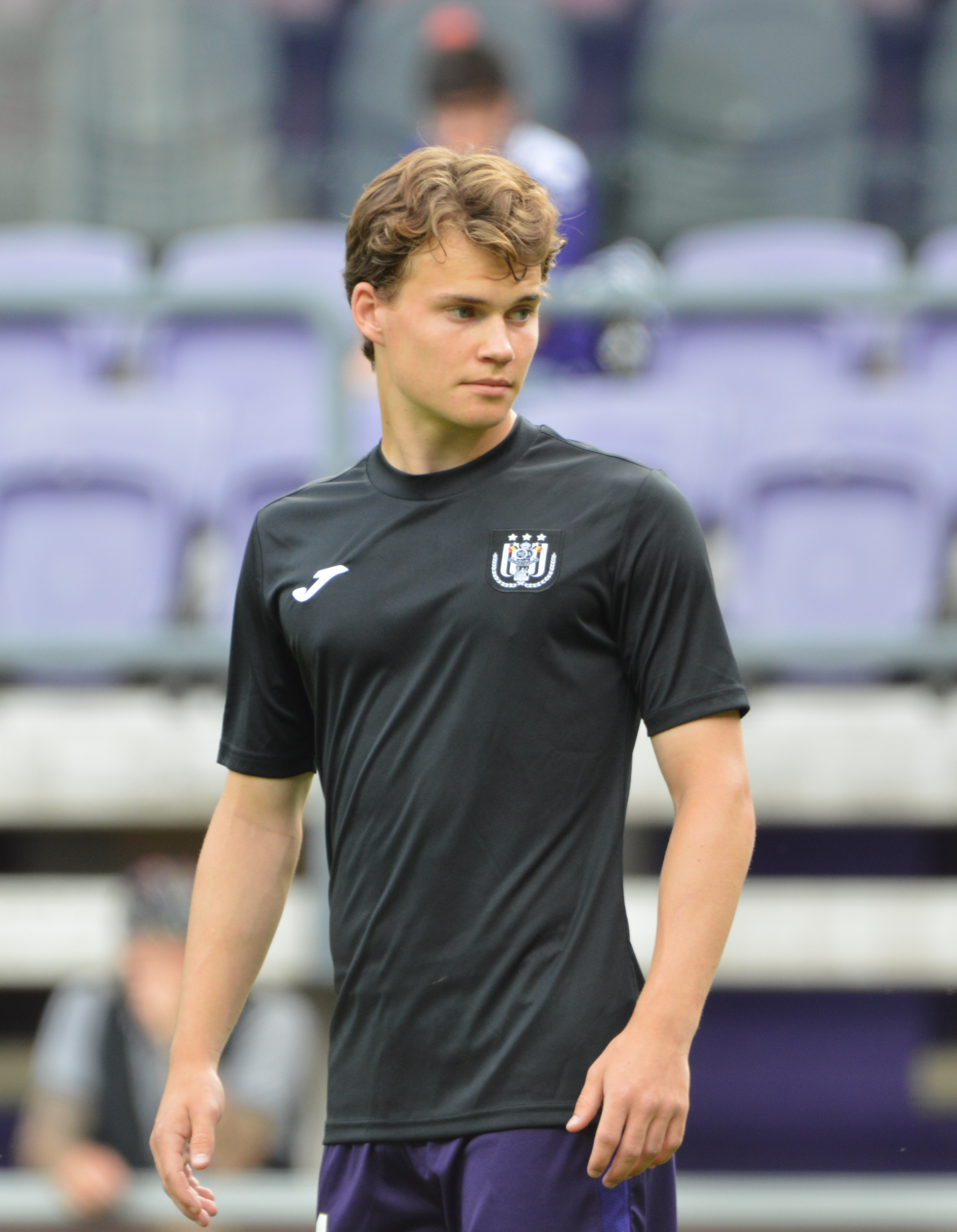
- Arnstad playing for Anderlecht in 2021

Personal information
- Full name: Kristian Fredrik Malt Arnstad
- Date of birth: 7 September 2003 (age 23)
- Place of birth: Oslo, Norway
- Height: 1.75 m (5 ft 9 in)
- Position: Midfielder

Team information
- Current team: AGF
- Number: 10

Youth career
- 2014–2016: Heming
- 2016–2019: Stabæk
- 2019–2020: Anderlecht

Senior career*
Years	Team	Apps	(Gls)
2020–2024	Anderlecht	50	(1)
2023–2024	→ RSCA Futures	2	(0)
2024–	AGF	58	(12)

International career^{‡}
2018	Norway U15	7	(0)
2019	Norway U16	15	(5)
2021	Norway U18	8	(1)
2022	Norway U19	1	(0)
2022–2024	Norway U21	24	(8)
2025–	Norway	1	(0)
- * Club domestic league appearances and goals as of 10 December 2025 ‡ National team caps and goals as of 20:05, 25 August 2026 (UTC)

Kristian Fredrik Malt Arnstad (born 7 September 2003) is a Norwegian professional footballer who plays as a midfielder for Danish Superliga club AGF and the Norway national team.

== Professional career ==
A youth product of Heming, Arnstad signed with Anderlecht on 15 September 2019. Arnstad made his professional debut with Anderlecht in a 3–0 Belgian First Division A loss to Club Brugge KV on 4 October 2020.

On 31 August 2024, Danish Superliga club AGF confirmed that Arnstad joined the club on a deal until June 2029. In 2026 he won the Danish Championship with the club, the first in 40 years.

After Patrick Mortensen left the club, Arnstad was appointed captain of AGF for the 2026-27 season.

== Career statistics ==
As of match played 29 July 2026

Club	Season	League			National cup (Note: Includes Belgian Cup, Danish Cup)		Europe		Total	
Club	Season	Division	Apps	Goals	Apps	Goals	Apps	Goals	Apps	Goals
Anderlecht	2020–21	Belgian Pro League	2	0	1	0	—		3	0
Anderlecht	2021–22	Belgian Pro League	6	0	0	0	—		6	0
Anderlecht	2022–23	Belgian Pro League	27	1	1	0	15 (Note: Appearances in UEFA Conference League)	0	43	1
Anderlecht	2023–24	Belgian Pro League	14	0	1	0	—		15	0
Anderlecht	2024–25	Belgian Pro League	1	0	0	0	—		1	0
Anderlecht	Total		50	1	3	0	15	0	68	1
AGF	2024–25	Danish Superliga	24	1	4	0	—		28	1
AGF	2025–26	Danish Superliga	30	9	6	1	—		36	10
AGF	2026–27	Danish Superliga	1	1	0	0	2	2	3	3
AGF	Total		55	11	10	1	2	2	67	14
Career total			105	12	13	1	17	2	134	15

=== International ===
As of match played 14 October 2025

Appearances and goals by national team and year
National team	Year	Apps	Goals
Norway
Norway	2025	1	0
Total		1	0

== Honours ==
AGF

- Danish Superliga: 2025–26
