= Marco Kana =

Belgian footballer

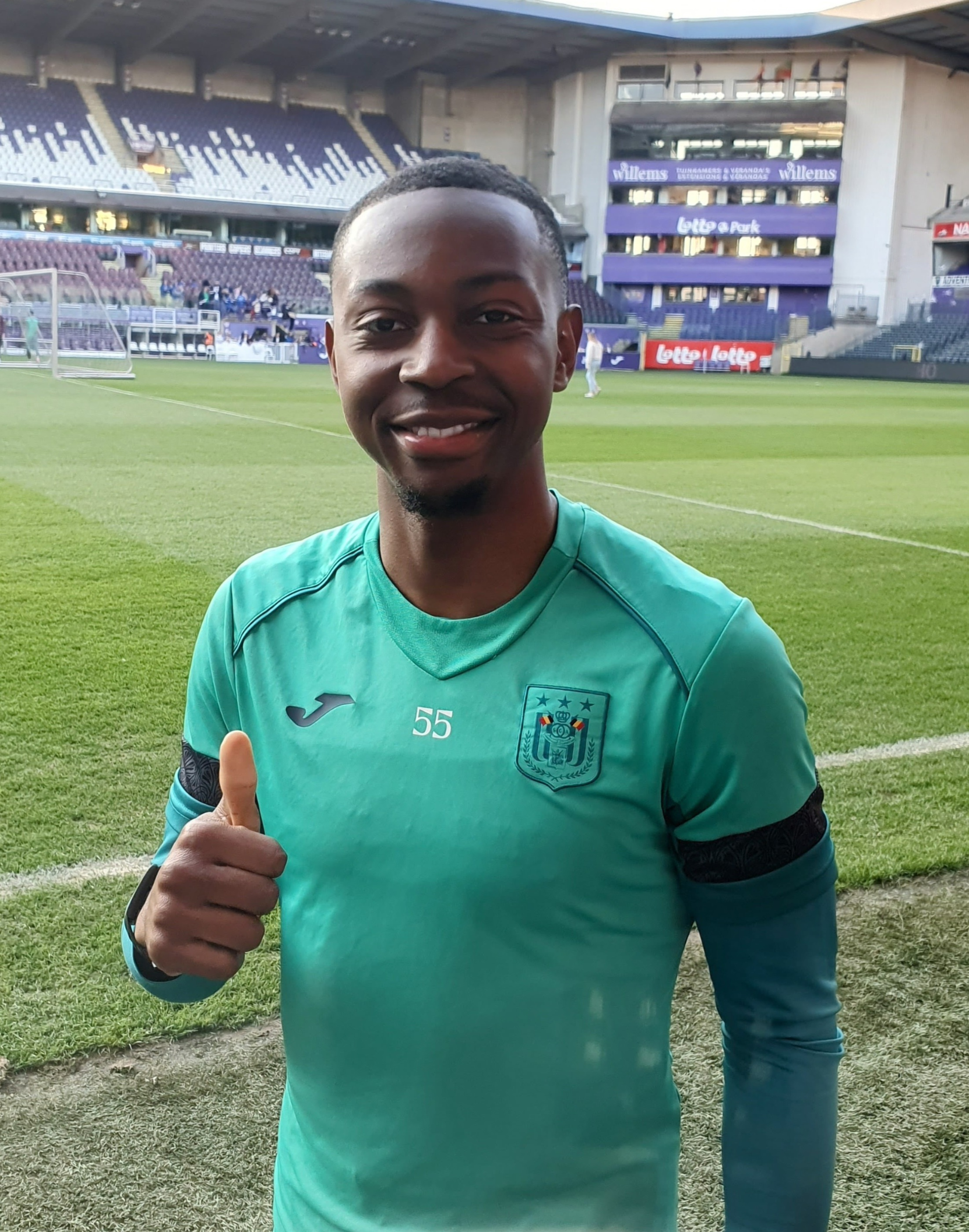
- Kana with Anderlecht in 2025

Personal information
- Date of birth: 8 August 2002 (age 24)
- Place of birth: Kinshasa, DR Congo
- Height: 1.82 m (6 ft 0 in)
- Position: Defender

Team information
- Current team: Anderlecht
- Number: 55

Youth career
- –2019: Anderlecht

Senior career*
| Years | Team | Apps | (Gls) |
| 2019– | Anderlecht | 79 | (1) |
| 2022–2025 | RSCA Futures | 14 | (0) |
| 2023–2024 | → Kortrijk (loan) | 20 | (0) |

International career
| 2018 | Belgium U16 | 4 | (1) |
| 2018–2019 | Belgium U17 | 14 | (0) |
| 2019–2020 | Belgium U19 | 4 | (0) |
| 2020–2023 | Belgium U21 | 12 | (0) |
- * Club domestic league appearances and goals as of 25 October 2026

Marco Kana (born 8 August 2002) is a professional footballer who plays as a defender for Belgian Pro League club Anderlecht. Born in DR Congo, Kana represents Belgium internationally.

== Club career ==
Kana was born in Kinshasa, DR Congo, and moved to Belgium at a young age. In 2019, he joined Anderlecht. On 20 October 2019, he scored his first goal in a 4–1 win over Sint-Truiden, to become the 7th youngest scorer at the club.

On 1 September 2023, he extended his contract with Anderlecht until 2026, and was loaned out to Kortrijk.

== International career ==
He is a youth international for Belgium. He captained the Belgium U17 at the 2019 European Championship.

== Career statistics ==
As of match played 25 October 2026

Appearances and goals by club, season and competition
| Club | Season | League | | | Belgian Cup | | Europe | | Other | | Total | |
| Club | Season | Division | Apps | Goals | Apps | Goals | Apps | Goals | Apps | Goals | Apps | Goals |
|---|---|---|---|---|---|---|---|---|---|---|---|---|
| Anderlecht | 2019–20 | Belgian Pro League | 15 | 1 | 2 | 0 | — | | — | | 17 | 1 |
| Anderlecht | 2020–21 | Belgian Pro League | 8 | 0 | 2 | 0 | — | | — | | 10 | 0 |
| Anderlecht | 2021–22 | Belgian Pro League | 10 | 0 | 2 | 0 | 1 (Note: Appearance(s) in UEFA Europa Conference League) | 0 | — | | 13 | 0 |
| Anderlecht | 2022–23 | Belgian Pro League | 9 | 0 | 0 | 0 | 7 | 0 | — | | 16 | 0 |
| Anderlecht | 2023–24 | Belgian Pro League | 2 | 0 | 0 | 0 | — | | — | | 2 | 0 |
| Anderlecht | 2024–25 | Belgian Pro League | 1 | 0 | 0 | 0 | — | | — | | 1 | 0 |
| Anderlecht | 2025–26 | Belgian Pro League | 26 | 0 | 3 | 0 | 5 (Note: One appearance in UEFA Europa League, four appearance in UEFA Conference League) | 0 | — | | 34 | 0 |
| Anderlecht | 2026–27 | Belgian Pro League | 9 | 0 | 0 | 0 | 8 (Note: Appearances in UEFA Europa League) | 0 | — | | 17 | 0 |
| Anderlecht | Total | | 80 | 1 | 9 | 0 | 21 | 0 | — | | 110 | 1 |
| RSCA Futures | 2022–23 | Challenger Pro League | 3 | 0 | — | | — | | — | | 3 | 0 |
| RSCA Futures | 2024–25 | Challenger Pro League | 11 | 0 | — | | — | | — | | 11 | 0 |
| RSCA Futures | Total | | 14 | 0 | — | | — | | — | | 14 | 0 |
| Kortrijk (loan) | 2023–24 | Belgian Pro League | 20 | 0 | 2 | 0 | — | | — | | 22 | 0 |
| Career total | | | 114 | 1 | 11 | 0 | 21 | 0 | — | | 146 | 1 |
