= Majeed Ashimeru =

Ghanaian footballer

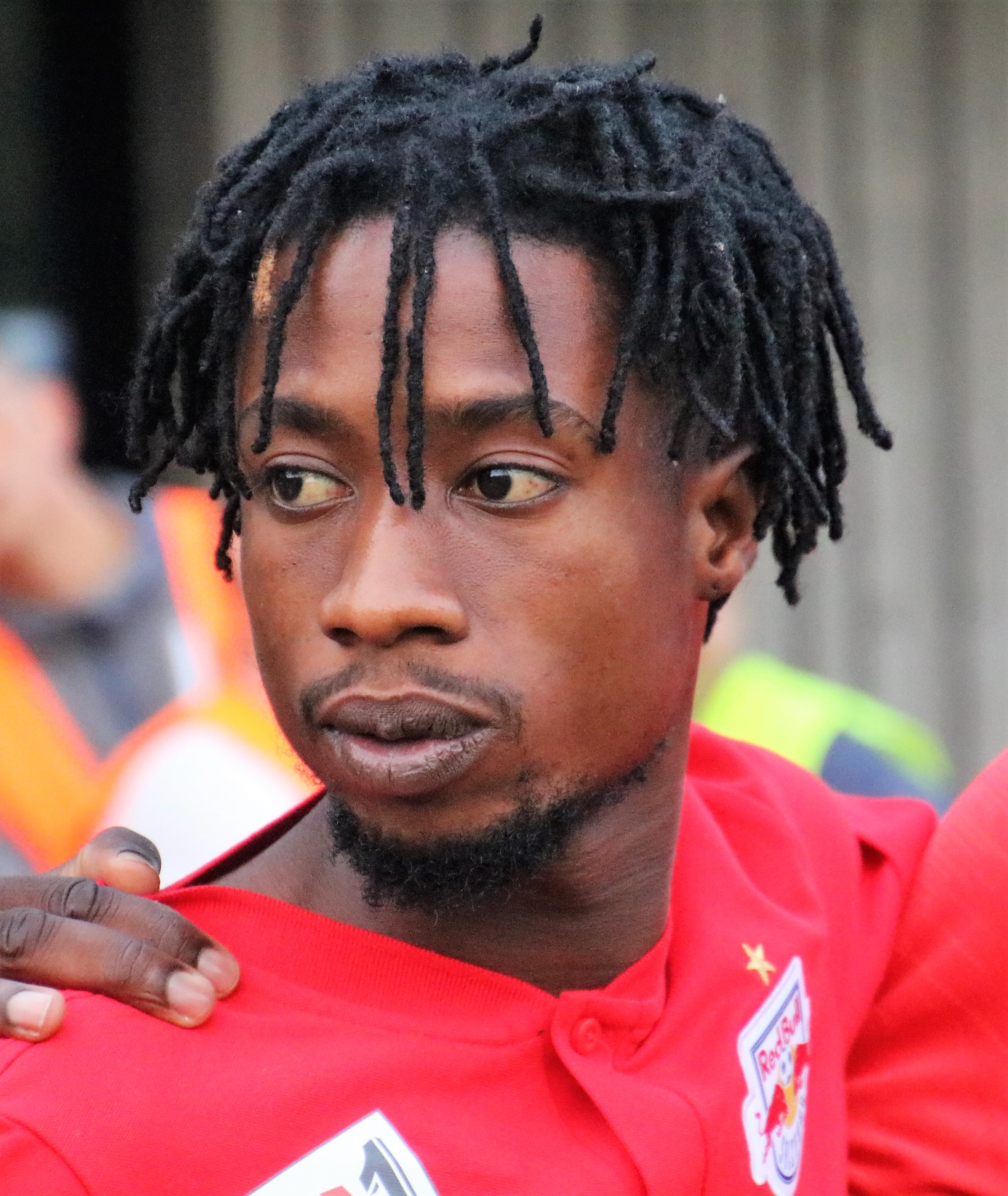
- Ashimeru with Red Bull Salzburg in 2019

Personal information
- Date of birth: 10 October 1997 (age 29)
- Place of birth: Accra, Ghana
- Height: 1.79 m (5 ft 10 in)
- Position: Midfielder

Senior career*
Years	Team	Apps	(Gls)
2016–2017	WAFA SC	5	(0)
2017–2021	Red Bull Salzburg	29	(2)
2017–2018	→ Austria Lustenau (loan)	11	(1)
2018	→ Wolfsberger AC (loan)	15	(2)
2018–2019	→ St. Gallen (loan)	34	(4)
2021	→ Anderlecht (loan)	11	(1)
2021–2026	Anderlecht	90	(6)
2023–2026	RSCA Futures	8	(1)
2026	→ RAAL La Louvière (loan)	9	(0)

International career^{‡}
2017–	Ghana	13	(0)
- * Club domestic league appearances and goals as of 11 May 2026 ‡ National team caps and goals as of 23 May 2026

Majeed Ashimeru (born 10 October 1997) is a Ghanaian professional footballer who plays as a midfielder for the Ghana national team.

== Club career ==
Ashimeru began his football career with Strong Tower FC Mamobi. He made his First Capital Plus Premier League debut for WAFA SC on 20 March 2016 in a game against Liberty Professionals. In 2017, he joined Austrian club Red Bull Salzburg where he signed his first professional contract.

He considers his UEFA debut as one of his proudest moment. He was introduced in the game as a second-half substitute for Red Bull Salzburg when they played Liverpool on 2 October 2019 at Anfield.

On 2 September 2026, his contract with Anderlecht was terminated by mutual consent.

== International career ==
Ashimeru made his debut for the Ghana national team on 25 May 2017 in a friendly against Benin.

== Career statistics ==
=== Club ===
As of match played 9 May 2026

Appearances and goals by club, season and competition
Club	Season	League			National cup (Note: Includes Austrian Cup, Swiss Cup, Belgian Cup)		Continental		Other		Total	
Club	Season	Division	Apps	Goals	Apps	Goals	Apps	Goals	Apps	Goals	Apps	Goals
West African Football Academy	2016	Ghana Premier League	5	0	—		—		—		5	0
Austria Lustenau (loan)	2017–18	Erste Liga	11	1	1	0	—		—		12	1
Wolfsberger AC (loan)	2017–18	Austrian Bundesliga	15	2	0	0	—		—		15	2
St. Gallen (loan)	2018–19	Swiss Super League	34	4	3	1	2 (Note: Appearances in UEFA Europa League)	0	—		39	5
Red Bull Salzburg	2019–20	Austrian Bundesliga	20	2	5	1	4 (Note: Appearances in UEFA Champions League)	0	—		29	3
Red Bull Salzburg	2020–21	Austrian Bundesliga	9	0	2	0	2	0	—		13	0
Red Bull Salzburg	Total		29	2	7	1	6	0	—		42	3
Anderlecht	2020–21	Belgian Pro League	11	1	1	1	—		—		12	2
Anderlecht	2021–22	Belgian Pro League	31	3	6	0	2 (Note: Appearances in UEFA Europa Conference League)	0	—		39	3
Anderlecht	2022–23	Belgian Pro League	28	2	2	0	12	1	—		42	3
Anderlecht	2023–24	Belgian Pro League	12	0	1	0	—		—		13	0
Anderlecht	2024–25	Belgian Pro League	19	1	0	0	4	0	—		23	1
Anderlecht	2026–27	Belgian Pro League	0	0	0	0	0	0	—		0	0
Anderlecht	Total		101	7	10	1	18	1	—		129	9
RSCA Futures	2023–24	Challenger Pro League	2	0	—		—		—		2	0
RSCA Futures	2024–25	Challenger Pro League	2	0	—		—		—		2	0
RSCA Futures	2025–26	Challenger Pro League	4	1	—		—		—		4	1
RSCA Futures	Total		8	1	—		—		—		8	1
RAAL La Louvière (loan)	2025–26	Belgian Pro League	9	0	—		—		—		9	0
Career total			212	17	21	3	26	1	0	0	263	21

=== International ===
As of match played 22 May 2026

Appearances and goals by national team and year
National team	Year	Apps	Goals
Ghana	2021	1	0
Ghana	2023	3	0
Ghana	2024	6	0
Ghana	2025	2	0
Ghana	2026	1	0
Total		13	0

== Honours ==
Red Bull Salzburg

- Austrian Bundesliga: 2019–20
- Austrian Cup: 2019–20
