= Hannes Delcroix =

Haitian footballer (born 1999)

- Delcroix in 2017

Personal information
- Full name: Hannes Piterson Delcroix
- Date of birth: 28 February 1999 (age 27)
- Place of birth: Petite Rivière de l'Artibonite, Haiti
- Height: 1.85 m (6 ft 1 in)
- Positions: Centre-back; left-back

Team information
- Current team: Lugano
- Number: 3

Youth career
- 2013–2017: Anderlecht

Senior career*
Years	Team	Apps	(Gls)
2017–2023	Anderlecht	51	(0)
2019–2020	→ RKC Waalwijk (loan)	23	(1)
2023–2026	Burnley	12	(0)
2025	→ Swansea City (loan)	12	(0)
2026–	Lugano	21	(4)

International career^{‡}
2014	Belgium U15	3	(0)
2014–2015	Belgium U16	7	(0)
2015–2016	Belgium U17	14	(0)
2016–2017	Belgium U18	4	(0)
2017	Belgium U19	4	(2)
2020	Belgium U21	2	(0)
2020	Belgium	1	(0)
2025–	Haiti	13	(0)
- * Club domestic league appearances and goals as of 09:37, 27 September 2026 (UTC) ‡ National team caps and goals as of 23:13, 4 October 2026 (UTC)

Hannes Piterson Delcroix (born 28 February 1999) is a Haitian professional footballer who plays as a centre-back or left-back for Swiss Super League club Lugano and the Haiti national team.

== Club career ==
Delcroix was born in Petite Rivière de l'Artibonite, Haiti, and at a young age moved to Kalmthout, in Belgium.

=== Anderlecht ===
Delcroix joined the youth academy of Anderlecht in 2013. Delcroix signed his first professional contract with Anderlecht on 25 January 2017. He made his professional debut with Anderlecht in a 5–2 Belgian First Division A win over Oostende on 5 August 2018.

==== RKC (loan) ====
In July 2019, Delcroix was sent on a one-season loan to Eredivisie club RKC Waalwijk, who had just won promotion. On 3 August, Delcroix made his debut as a starter in the away match against VVV-Venlo, scoring the opener in the eleventh minute of play. His team eventually lost the game 3–1. Delcroix remained a starter throughout the season under head coach Fred Grim. After made a total of 24 competitive appearances, all as a starter, his loan spell ended and Delcroix returned to Anderlecht. Despite interest from RKC to extend the loan deal, Delcroix opted for a return to Anderlecht.

=== Burnley ===
On 22 August 2023, Delcroix joined Premier League club Burnley on a three-year contract for an undisclosed fee.

==== Swansea City (loan) ====
On 24 January 2025, Delcroix joined fellow Championship club Swansea City on loan for the remainder of the season.

=== Lugano ===
On 3 January 2026, Delcroix joined Swiss Super League club Lugano on a two-and-a-half-year contract for an undisclosed fee.

== International career ==
Born in Haiti, Delcroix was raised in Belgium. He is a youth international for Belgium, and captained various of their youth teams. He was called up to the senior Belgium squad in November 2020 and made his first appearance on 11 November against Switzerland. He was called up to the Haiti national team for a set of 2026 FIFA World Cup qualification matches in October 2025.

On 15 May 2026, he was included in Sébastien Migné's 26-man squad for Haiti's participation in the 2026 FIFA World Cup.

== Personal life ==
Hannes share his life with long-time partner Marie-Ange Djomo, and they have a son and a daughter.

== Career statistics ==
=== Club ===
As of match played 20 September 2026

Appearances and goals by club, season and competition
Club	Season	League			National cup (Note: Includes Belgian Cup, KNVB Cup, FA Cup)		League cup (Note: Includes EFL Cup)		Europe		Total	
Club	Season	Division	Apps	Goals	Apps	Goals	Apps	Goals	Apps	Goals	Apps	Goals
Anderlecht	2016–17	Belgian Pro League	0	0	0	0	—		0	0	0	0
Anderlecht	2018–19	Belgian Pro League	1	0	0	0	—		1 (Note: Appearance(s) in UEFA Europa League)	0	2	0
Anderlecht	2020–21	Belgian Pro League	23	0	2	0	—		—		25	0
Anderlecht	2021–22	Belgian Pro League	10	0	0	0	—		2 (Note: Appearances in UEFA Conference League)	1	12	1
Anderlecht	2022–23	Belgian Pro League	16	0	2	0	—		7	1	25	1
Anderlecht	2023–24	Belgian Pro League	1	0	—		—		—		1	0
Anderlecht	Total		51	0	4	0	—		10	2	65	2
RKC Waalwijk (loan)	2019–20	Eredivisie	23	1	1	0	—		—		24	1
Burnley	2023–24	Premier League	12	0	1	0	2	0	—		15	0
Burnley	2024–25	Championship	0	0	0	0	0	0	—		0	0
Burnley	2025–26	Premier League	0	0	0	0	0	0	—		0	0
Burnley	Total		12	0	1	0	2	0	—		15	0
Swansea City (loan)	2024–25	Championship	12	0	—		—		—		12	0
Lugano	2025–26	Swiss Super League	14	1	—		—		—		14	1
Lugano	2026–27	Swiss Super League	7	3	0	0	—		3	0	10	3
Lugano	Total		21	4	0	0	—		3	0	24	4
Career total			119	5	6	0	2	0	13	2	140	7

=== International ===
As of match played 4 October 2026

Appearances and goals by national team and year
National team	Year	Apps	Goals
Belgium	2020	1	0
Belgium	Total	1	0
Haiti	2025	3	0
Haiti	2026	10	0
Haiti	Total	13	0
Career total		14	0
