= 2020–21 RSC Anderlecht season =

Anderlecht
2020–21 season
- Chairman: Wouter Vandenhaute
- Head coach: Franky Vercauteren (until 17 August); Vincent Kompany (from 17 August)
- Stadium: Constant Vanden Stock Stadium
- Belgian First Division A: 3th
- Belgian Cup: Semi-finals
- Top goalscorer: League: Lukas Nmecha (18); All: Lukas Nmecha (21)
- Highest home attendance: 5,500 vs OH Leuven
- Lowest home attendance: 0
- Biggest win: Union SG 0–5 Anderlecht
- Biggest defeat: Club Brugge 3–0 Anderlecht
Home colours	Away colours	Third colours

The 2020–21 season was the 113th season in the existence of R.S.C. Anderlecht and the club's 85th consecutive season in the top flight of Belgian football. In addition to the domestic league, Anderlecht participated in this season's edition of the Belgian Cup. The season covered the period from 1 July 2020 to 30 June 2021.

== Players ==
=== First-team squad ===
As of 2 February 2021

Note: Flags indicate national team as defined under FIFA eligibility rules; some limited exceptions apply. Players may hold more than one non-FIFA nationality.

No.	Pos.	Nation	Player
1	GK	GER	Timon Wellenreuther
7	FW	GER	Lukas Nmecha (on loan from Manchester City)
8	MF	IRL	Josh Cullen
11	FW	DEN	Jacob Bruun Larsen (on loan from Hoffenheim)
12	FW	NGR	Paul Mukairu (on loan from Antalyaspor)
14	DF	UKR	Bohdan Mykhaylichenko
18	MF	GHA	Majeed Ashimeru (on loan from RB Salzburg)
20	DF	USA	Matt Miazga (on loan from Chelsea)
22	DF	BEL	Elias Cobbaut
23	FW	MLI	Abdoulay Diaby (on loan from Sporting CP)
24	GK	SUR	Warner Hahn
25	MF	FRA	Adrien Trebel
27	FW	BEL	Ilias Takidine
30	GK	BEL	Hendrik Van Crombrugge (captain)

No.	Pos.	Nation	Player
34	DF	BEL	Mohamed Bouchouari
38	FW	GHA	Mohammed Dauda
40	FW	BEL	Francis Amuzu
42	DF	BEL	Hannes Delcroix
46	MF	BEL	Anouar Ait El Hadj
48	MF	BEL	Albert Sambi Lokonga
51	MF	BEL	Yari Verschaeren
54	DF	BEL	Killian Sardella
55	DF	BEL	Marco Kana
61	MF	NOR	Kristian Arnstad
62	DF	PAN	Michael Murillo
70	GK	BEL	Rik Vercauteren
92	DF	JAM	Kemar Lawrence

=== Out on loan ===
Note: Flags indicate national team as defined under FIFA eligibility rules; some limited exceptions apply. Players may hold more than one non-FIFA nationality.

No.	Pos.	Nation	Player
5	MF	UKR	Yevhen Makarenko (at Kortrijk until 30 June 2021)
9	FW	BEL	Landry Dimata (at Espanyol until 30 June 2021)
10	MF	NED	Michel Vlap (at Arminia Bielefeld until 30 June 2021)
15	MF	USA	Kenny Saief (at Lechia Gdańsk until 30 June 2021)
17	MF	SRB	Luka Adžić (at FC Emmen until 30 June 2021)
19	FW	SLE	Mustapha Bundu (at Copenhagen until 30 June 2021)
21	DF	BIH	Ognjen Vranješ (at Sporting Charleroi until 30 June 2021)
23	MF	AUT	Peter Žulj (at Göztepe until 30 June 2021)

No.	Pos.	Nation	Player
24	FW	SWE	Isaac Kiese Thelin (at Kasımpaşa until 30 June 2021)
43	DF	BEL	Thierry Lutonda (at Waalwijk until 30 June 2021)
50	MF	BEL	Sieben Dewaele (at Heerenveen until 30 June 2021)
53	MF	BEL	Antoine Colassin (at Zulte Waregem until 30 June 2021)
99	MF	BEL	Zakaria Bakkali (at Beerschot until 30 June 2021)
—	DF	GAM	Bubacarr Sanneh (at Aarhus until 30 June 2021)
—	MF	ZIM	Knowledge Musona (at Eupen until 30 June 2021)
—	MF	BEL	Aristote Nkaka (at Paderborn until 30 June 2021)

== Transfers ==
=== In ===
Date	Pos	Player	Transferred from	Fee	Ref.
3 October 2020	DF	Matt Miazga	Chelsea	Loan	

=== Out ===
Date	Pos	Player	Transferred to	Fee	Ref.
4 August 2020	FW	Kemar Roofe	Rangers	Undisclosed	

== Pre-season and friendlies ==
Win Draw Loss Fixtures

Pre-season match details
Date	Time	Opponents	Venue	Result	Score F–A	Scorers	Attendance	Ref.
4 July 2020	12:00	Charleroi	H (Note: Match played at Complexe Sportif Neerpede - Terrein 6)	L	0–1			
11 July 2020	13:00	Sint-Truiden	H	W	3–0			
18 July 2020	15:30	Saint-Étienne	A	W	2–1	Vlap 18' pen., Roofe 68'		
18 July 2020	17:30	Saint-Étienne	A	W	1–0	Delcroix 2'		
1 August 2020	15:00	Lille	A (Note: Match played at Domaine de Luchin)	L	0–2		0	
4 September 2020	14:00	Bayer Leverkusen	A	D	1–1	Dauda 21'	0	
22 March 2021	12:00	Gent	A (Note: Match played at PGB-Stadion)	D	0–0			
26 March 2021	12:00	Kortrijk	H	L	1–2	38' pen.		

== Competitions ==
=== Overview ===
Competition	First match	Last match	Starting round	Final position	Record							
Competition	First match	Last match	Starting round	Final position	Pld	W	D	L	GF	GA	GD	Win %
Belgian First Division A	9 August 2020	23 May 2021	Matchday 1	4th	40	15	17	8	60	45	+15	37.50
Belgian Cup	3 February 2021	14 March 2021	Sixth round	Semi-finals	4	3	0	1	9	2	+7	75.00
Total					44	18	17	9	69	47	+22	40.91

Last updated: 23 May 2021
Source: Soccerway

=== Belgian First Division A ===
==== Regular season ====
Pos	Team	Pld	W	D	L	GF	GA	GD	Pts	Qualification or relegation
1	Club Brugge (C)	34	24	4	6	73	26	+47	76	Qualification for the Europa Conference League and Play-offs I (Note: The regular season winners will qualify for the 2021–22 UEFA Europa Conference League if they do not qualify for the 2021–22 UEFA Champions League in the playoffs or for the 2021–22 UEFA Europa League through the 2020–21 Belgian Cup.)
2	Antwerp	34	18	6	10	57	48	+9	60	Qualification for the Play-offs I
3	Anderlecht	34	15	13	6	51	34	+17	58	Qualification for the Play-offs I
4	Genk (Note: Genk qualifies for at least the play-off round of the Europa League through winning the 2021 Belgian Cup.)	34	16	8	10	67	48	+19	56	Qualification for the Play-offs I
5	Oostende (Note: On 14 April 2021 news was released that both Excel Mouscron and Oostende had not received a Belgian professional football license for the coming season, a requirement to play at the top two levels of Belgian football. For Oostende, a lack of financial transparency, together with generally poor quality and incompleteness of the submitted report, was given as the main reason by the committee for not awarding a license, while Excel Mouscron was refused a license as besides insufficient transparency, the committee also questioned several cash flows and whether the club was creditworthy in general, also due to the fact that the wages for the months of February and March had not yet been paid at that point. For Excel Mouscron, it was already the sixth year running the license was (initially) refused, however, the club has appealed the decision with the Belgian Court for Sports Arbitrage (BAS) successfully on each occasion and intended to do so again. Oostende was planning to launch an appeal as well, with the BAS to rule on the matter for both clubs before the 10th of May. Both clubs were allowed to add new documents to their case, but in case they however still did not receive a license after appeal, knew they would have been forced to relegate to the 2021–22 Belgian Division 2 and start the season with a 3-point penalty. Both Excel Mouscron and Oostende were however eventually awarded a license after appeal, meaning Oostende remained at the top level, while Excel Mouscron only dropped one level.)	34	15	8	11	49	41	+8	53	Qualification for the Play-offs II

Source: Jupiler Pro League (in Dutch), Soccerway
Rules for classification: 1) Points; 2) Matches won; 3) Goal difference; 4) Goals scored; 5) Away matches won; 6) Away goal difference; 7) Away goals scored; 8) Play-off.
(C) Champions

==== Results summary ====
Overall								Home						Away					
Pld	W	D	L	GF	GA	GD	Pts	W	D	L	GF	GA	GD	W	D	L	GF	GA	GD
34	15	13	6	51	34	+17	58	9	7	1	25	11	+14	6	6	5	26	23	+3

Last updated: 18 April 2021.
Source: Jupiler Pro League

==== Results by round ====
Round	1	2	3	4	5	6	7	8	9	10	11	12	13	14	15	16	17	18	19	20	21	22	23	24	25	26	27	28	29	30	31	32	33	34
Ground	A	H	H	A	H	A	H	A	H	A	H	A	A	H	A	H	H	A	H	A	A	H	H	A	H	A	A	H	A	H	H	A	H	A
Result	D	W	D	D	W	W	D	L	D	W	W	D	L	D	D	W	W	L	W	L	L	W	D	D	D	W	D	L	W	D	W	W	W	W
Position	7	4	5	8	6	5	5	7	8	7	5	7	7	8	7	6	7	4	4	5	6	5	6	5	5	4	4	5	5	5	5	4	4	3

Updated to match(es) played on 18 April 2021. Source: Jupiler Pro League
A = Away; H = Home; W = Win; D = Draw; L = Loss

==== Matches ====
The league fixtures were announced on 8 July 2020.

Belgian First Division A match details
Date	Time	Opponents	Venue	Result	Score F–A	Scorers	Attendance	Referee	Ref.
9 August 2020	18:15	KV Mechelen	A	D	2–2	Doku 64', Bushiri 75' o.g.	0	Boucaut	
16 August 2020	18:15	Sint-Truiden	H	W	3–1	Mykhaylichenko 41', Dimata 50', Tau 90+3'	0	Visser	
23 August 2020	18:15	Excel Mouscron	H	D	1–1	Dimata 63' pen.	0	Smet	
28 August 2020	20:45	Oostende	A	D	2–2	Trebel 35', Tau 54'	0	Boterberg	
13 September 2020	13:30	Cercle Brugge	H	W	2–0	Nmecha 36' pen., Murillo 68'	6,000	Laforge	
19 September 2020	20:45	Waasland-Beveren	A	W	4–2	Trebel 3', Doku 18', Verschaeren 55', Nmecha 60' pen.	1,800	Visser	
27 September 2020	16:00	Eupen	H	D	1–1	Lokonga 71'	6,000	D'hondt	
4 October 2020	13:30	Club Brugge	A	L	0–3		9,000	Lambrechts	
18 October 2020	20:30	OH Leuven	H	D	2–2	Verschaeren 38', Tau 45'	5,500	Van Driessche	
23 October 2020	20:45	Kortrijk	A	W	3–1	Nmecha (2) 6', 65', Tau 30'	0	Lardot	
1 November 2020	13:30	Antwerp	H	W	1–0	Mukairu 76'	0	Boterberg	
8 November 2020	18:15	Gent	A	D	1–1	Murillo 44'	0	Laforge	
22 November 2020	13:30	Beerschot	A	L	1–2	Nmecha 87'	0	Boucaut	
29 November 2020	18:15	Standard Liège	H	D	0–0		0	Lardot	
4 December 2020	20:45	Zulte Waregem	A	D	2–2	Nmecha 42', Lokonga 65'	0	Boterberg	
11 December 2020	20:45	Genk	H	W	1–0	Nmecha 59' pen.	0	Verboomen	
15 December 2020	21:00	Oostende	H	W	2–1	Nmecha (2) 18', 58' pen.	0	Van Damme	
18 December 2020	20:45	Charleroi	A	L	0–1		0	Visser	
27 December 2020	18:15	Beerschot	H	W	2–0	Nmecha 32', Mukairu 71'	0	Laforge	
10 January 2021	18:15	OH Leuven	A	L	0–1		0	Verboomen	
15 January 2021	20:45	Eupen	A	L	0–2		0	Boucaut	
19 January 2021	21:00	Charleroi	H	W	3–0	Nmecha 23' pen., Vlap 45+1' pen., Amuzu 81'	0	van Driessche	
22 January 2021	20:45	Waasland-Beveren	H	D	0–0		0	Verboomen	
26 January 2021	21:00	Excel Mouscron	A	D	1–1	Nmecha 90+4' pen.	0	Smet	
31 January 2021	18:15	Gent	H	D	0–0		0	Lambrechts	
7 February 2021	18:15	Genk	A	W	2–1	Vukovic 19' o.g., El Hadj 22'	0	Van Driessche	
14 February 2021	20:45	Cercle Brugge	A	D	0–0		0	Laforge	
21 February 2021	13:30	Kortrijk	H	L	0–2		0	Visser	
28 February 2021	13:30	Standard Liège	A	W	3–1	Lawrence 71', Amuzu 23', Dauda 90+4'	0	Lambrechts	
7 March 2021	18:15	KV Mechelen	H	D	1–1	Nmecha 43' pen.	0	D'hondt	
21 March 2021	18:15	Zulte Waregem	H	W	4–1	El Hadj 32', Murillo 45+2', Verschaeren 54', Diaby 89'	0	Boterberg	
5 April 2021	18:15	Antwerp	A	W	4–1	Ashimeru 52', Murillo 62', El Hadj 77', Verschaeren 84'	0	Lambrechts	
11 April 2021	18:15	Club Brugge	H	W	2–1	Nmecha 72', Lokonga 76'	0	Visser	
18 April 2021	18:00	Sint-Truiden	A	W	1–0	Verschaeren 80'	0	Laforge	

==== Play-Off I ====
Pos	Team	Pld	W	D	L	GF	GA	GD	Pts	Qualification or relegation	CLU	GNK	ANT	AND
1	Club Brugge (C)	6	1	3	2	8	11	−3	44	Qualification for the Champions League group stage	—	1–2	2–1	2–2
2	Genk	6	5	1	0	15	5	+10	44	Qualification for the Champions League third qualifying round	3–0	—	4–0	1–1
3	Antwerp	6	1	2	3	6	11	−5	35	Qualification for the Europa League play-off round	0–0	2–3	—	1–0
4	Anderlecht	6	0	4	2	9	11	−2	33	Qualification for the Europa Conference League third qualifying round	3–3	1–2	2–2	—

Source: Jupiler Pro League (in Dutch), Soccerway
Legend: Blue = home team win; Yellow = draw; Red = away team win.
Rules for classification: 1) Points; 2) Points without (possible) half points added due to rounding; 3) Regular season finishing position.
(C) Champions

==== Results summary ====
Overall								Home						Away					
Pld	W	D	L	GF	GA	GD	Pts	W	D	L	GF	GA	GD	W	D	L	GF	GA	GD
6	0	4	2	9	11	−2	4	0	2	1	6	7	−1	0	2	1	3	4	−1

Last updated: 23 May 2021.
Source: Jupiler Pro League

==== Results by round ====
Round	1	2	3	4	5	6
Ground	A	H	A	H	H	A
Result	D	D	D	L	D	L
Position	3	4	4	4	3	4

Updated to match(es) played on 23 May 2021. Source: Jupiler Pro League
A = Away; H = Home; W = Win; D = Draw; L = Loss

==== Matches ====
Play-off I match details
Date	Time	Opponents	Venue	Result	Score F–A	Scorers	Attendance	Referee	Ref.
2 May 2021	18:30	Club Brugge	A	D	2–2	Nmecha 64', Bruun Larsen 86'	0	Lardot	
8 May 2021	20:45	Antwerp	H	D	2–2	Verschaeren 57', Miazga 90+6'	0	Lambrechts	
12 May 2021	20:45	Genk	A	D	1–1	El Hadj 33'	0	Verboomen	
15 May 2021	20:45	Genk	H	L	1–2	Nmecha 31'	0	Lardot	
20 May 2021	21:00	Club Brugge	H	D	3–3	Nmecha (2) 45+2' pen., 65', Bruun Larsen 90+4'	0	Visser	
23 May 2021	18:30	Antwerp	A	L	0–1		0	Boucaut	

=== Belgian Cup ===
Belgian Cup match details
Round	Date	Time	Opponents	Venue	Result	Score F–A	Scorers	Attendance	Referee	Ref.
Sixth round	3 February 2021	21:15	RFC Liège	A	W	2–0	Mukairu 29', Ashimeru 67'	0		
Seventh round	11 February 2021	20:45	Union SG	A	W	5–0	Nmecha (2) 16', 57', Mukairu 61', Diaby (2) 71' pen., 82'	0		
Quarter-finals	3 March 2021	20:45	Cercle Brugge	H	W	1–0	Nmecha 13'	0	Van Driessche	
Semi-finals	14 March 2021	20:45	Genk	H	L	1–2	Trebel 73'	0	Lardot	

== Statistics ==
=== Squad appearances and goals ===
Last updated 23 May 2021

No.	Pos	Nat	Player	Total		Belgian Division		Belgian Cup	
No.	Pos	Nat	Player	Apps	Goals	Apps	Goals	Apps	Goals
Goalkeepers
1	GK	(Germany) GER	Timon Wellenreuther	27	0	22+1	0	4	0
16	GK	(Netherlands) NED	Bart Verbruggen	6	0	6	0	0	0
24	GK	(Suriname) SUR	Warner Hahn	0	0	0	0	0	0
30	GK	(Belgium) BEL	Hendrik Van Crombrugge	12	0	12	0	0	0
70	GK	(Belgium) BEL	Rik Vercauteren	0	0	0	0	0	0
Defenders
14	DF	(Ukraine) UKR	Bohdan Mykhaylichenko	27	1	23	1	3+1	0
20	DF	(United States) USA	Matt Miazga	33	1	30	1	3	0
22	DF	(Belgium) BEL	Elias Cobbaut	15	0	11+2	0	2	0
32	DF	(Netherlands) NED	Derrick Luckassen	8	0	7+1	0	0	0
42	DF	(Belgium) BEL	Hannes Delcroix	34	0	32	0	2	0
47	DF	(Belgium) BEL	Lucas Lissens	4	0	2	0	1+1	0
54	DF	(Belgium) BEL	Killian Sardella	17	0	13+3	0	1	0
55	DF	(Belgium) BEL	Marco Kana	10	0	4+4	0	0+2	0
62	DF	(Panama) PAN	Michael Murillo	39	4	33+3	4	3	0
Midfielders
8	MF	(Republic of Ireland) IRL	Josh Cullen	30	0	20+7	0	3	0
18	MF	(Ghana) GHA	Majeed Ashimeru	12	2	2+9	1	0+1	1
25	MF	(France) FRA	Adrien Trebel	20	3	11+7	2	0+2	1
46	MF	(Belgium) BEL	Anouar Ait El Hadj	31	4	22+6	4	3	0
48	MF	(Belgium) BEL	Albert Sambi Lokonga	37	3	33	3	4	0
51	MF	(Belgium) BEL	Yari Verschaeren	23	6	18+4	6	0+1	0
52	MF	(Belgium) BEL	Mario Stroeykens	4	0	0+3	0	0+1	0
53	MF	(Belgium) BEL	Antoine Colassin	7	0	1+6	0	0	0
56	MF	(Belgium) BEL	Zeno Debast	2	0	0+2	0	0	0
61	MF	(Norway) NOR	Kristian Arnstad	3	0	1+1	0	0+1	0
Forwards
7	FW	(Germany) GER	Lukas Nmecha	41	21	36+1	18	4	3
11	FW	(Denmark) DEN	Jacob Bruun Larsen	19	2	5+10	2	2+2	0
12	FW	(Nigeria) NGR	Paul Mukairu	29	4	15+10	2	2+2	2
23	FW	(Mali) MLI	Abdoulay Diaby	12	2	2+7	0	2+1	2
38	FW	(Ghana) GHA	Mohammed Dauda	20	1	0+17	1	0+3	0
40	FW	(Belgium) BEL	Francis Amuzu	39	2	18+17	2	4	0
Players who have made an appearance this season but have left the club
21	DF	(Bosnia and Herzegovina) BIH	Ognjen Vranješ	4	0	4	0	0	0
39	DF	(Democratic Republic of the Congo) COD	Edo Kayembe	2	0	0+2	0	0	0
44	DF	(Croatia) CRO	Antonio Milić	0	0	0	0	0	0
92	DF	(Jamaica) JAM	Kemar Lawrence	16	1	14+1	1	1	0
10	MF	(Netherlands) NED	Michel Vlap	11	1	8+3	1	0	0
17	MF	(Serbia) SRB	Luka Adžić	0	0	0	0	0	0
23	MF	(Austria) AUT	Peter Žulj	8	1	7+1	1	0	0
99	MF	(Belgium) BEL	Zakaria Bakkali	2	0	2	0	0	0
9	FW	(Belgium) BEL	Landry Dimata	14	2	4+10	2	0	0
11	FW	(South Africa) RSA	Percy Tau	14	4	12+2	4	0	0
19	FW	(Sierra Leone) SLE	Mustapha Bundu	9	0	5+4	0	0	0
49	FW	(Belgium) BEL	Jérémy Doku	7	2	7	2	0	0

=== Goalscorers ===
As of 23 May 2021

Rank	No.	Pos	Nat	Name	Pro League	Belgian Cup	Total
1	9	FW	(Germany)	Lukas Nmecha	18	3	21
2	51	MF	(Belgium)	Yari Verschaeren	6	0	6
3	11	FW	(South Africa)	Percy Tau	4	0	4
3	12	FW	(Nigeria)	Paul Mukairu	2	2	4
3	46	MF	(Belgium)	Anouar Ait El Hadj	4	0	4
3	62	DF	(Panama)	Michael Amir Murillo	4	0	4
7	25	MF	(France)	Adrien Trebel	2	1	3
7	48	MF	(Belgium)	Albert Sambi Lokonga	3	0	3
9	9	FW	(Belgium)	Landry Dimata	2	0	2
9	11	FW	(Denmark)	Jacob Bruun Larsen	2	0	2
9	18	MF	(Ghana)	Majeed Ashimeru	1	1	2
9	23	FW	(Mali)	Abdoulay Diaby	0	2	2
9	49	FW	(Belgium)	Jérémy Doku	2	0	2
14	10	MF	(Netherlands)	Michel Vlap	1	0	1
14	14	DF	(Ukraine)	Bohdan Mykhaylichenko	1	0	1
14	20	DF	(United States)	Matt Miazga	1	0	1
14	23	MF	(Austria)	Peter Žulj	1	0	1
14	38	FW	(Ghana)	Mohammed Dauda	1	0	1
14	92	DF	(Jamaica)	Kemar Lawrence	1	0	1
Own goal					2	0	2
Totals					60	9	69
