= Anders Dreyer =

Danish footballer (born 1998)

- Dreyer with San Diego FC in 2026

Personal information
- Full name: Anders Laustrup Dreyer
- Date of birth: 2 May 1998 (age 28)
- Place of birth: Bramming, Denmark
- Height: 1.70 m (5 ft 7 in)
- Position: Right winger

Team information
- Current team: San Diego FC
- Number: 10

Youth career
- Ribe BK
- Bramming BK
- Esbjerg fB

Senior career*
Years	Team	Apps	(Gls)
2016–2018	Esbjerg fB	41	(20)
2018–2020	Brighton & Hove Albion	0	(0)
2019	→ St Mirren (loan)	10	(1)
2019–2020	→ SC Heerenveen (loan)	11	(1)
2020–2021	Midtjylland	53	(15)
2021–2022	Rubin Kazan	14	(8)
2022	→ Midtjylland (loan)	10	(5)
2022–2023	Midtjylland	16	(8)
2023–2025	Anderlecht	69	(26)
2025–	San Diego FC	67	(34)

International career^{‡}
2014–2015	Denmark U17	6	(3)
2016	Denmark U18	4	(0)
2017	Denmark U19	1	(0)
2017	Denmark U20	2	(0)
2018–2021	Denmark U21	21	(2)
2021–	Denmark	9	(3)
- * Club domestic league appearances and goals as of 03:24, 8 November 2026 (UTC) ‡ National team caps and goals as of 31 March 2026

Anders Laustrup Dreyer (Danish pronunciation: [ˈtʁɑjɐ]; born 2 May 1998) is a Danish professional footballer who plays as a right winger for Major League Soccer club San Diego FC and the Denmark national team.

Dreyer previously played for Esbjerg fB, Brighton & Hove Albion, St Mirren, SC Heerenveen, Midtjylland, Rubin Kazan, and Anderlecht.

== Club career ==
=== Esbjerg fB ===
On 20 September 2016, Esbjerg fB confirmed that they had extended Dreyer's contract by one year until 2018. But he continued playing for their U19 squad.

Dreyer got his debut on 2 April 2017 in a 0–0 draw against Randers FC in the Danish Superliga coming on in the 72nd minute to replace Awer Mabil. He scored his first goal for Esbjerg on 22 April 2017 against AC Horsens.

He was promoted to the first team squad for the 2017–18 season in the Danish 1st Division. In this season he finished as the league topscorer with 18 goals, helping Esbjerg win promotion to the Superliga. On 27 May 2018, Dreyer scored his first hat-trick of his career in the second leg of their promotion playoff games against Silkeborg IF. His 3 goals secured a 3–1 aggregate lead to take Esbjerg back into the Superliga. Dreyer ended the season as the topscorer 2017–18 Danish 1st Division, scoring 18 goals.

=== Brighton & Hove Albion ===
On 7 August 2018, Dreyer was sold to Brighton & Hove Albion. Dreyer started on the U23 team, and got his debut in the first game of the season against Liverpool U23 on 8 October 2018. In January 2019, Dreyer joined St Mirren on loan until the end of the season. After picking up an knee injury at the end of April, Dreyer returned to Brighton & Hove Albion and missed the end of the season. Dreyer scored one goal in his eleven appearances for the club.

On 23 August 2019, SC Heerenveen announced, that they had signed Dreyer on loan for the 2019–20 season. He made his debut 8 days later coming on as a substitute in a 1–1 home draw against Fortuna Sittard.

=== FC Midtjylland ===
On 6 January 2020, FC Midtjylland announced that Dreyer had returned to Denmark and signed a four-and-a-half-year contract with the club. His strong start – two goals and one assist in his first two appearances for the club – led to him being named as the Danish Superliga Player of the Month for February 2020.

=== Rubin Kazan ===
On 28 August 2021, Dreyer signed a five-year contract with Russian club Rubin Kazan. On his debut on 13 September 2021 he scored a hat-trick against Ural Yekaterinburg. He became the first player in the history of the league to score three goals in their first game in the league.

On 11 March 2022, Dreyer's contract with Rubin was suspended until 30 June 2022 according to special FIFA regulations related to the Russian invasion of Ukraine. The regulations allow foreign players in Russia to suspend their contracts until the end of the 2021–22 season and sign with a club outside of Russia until that date.

=== Return to Midtjylland ===
On 16 March 2022, Dreyer returned to FC Midtjylland on a loan until 30 June 2022. On 6 July 2022, he transferred to Midtjylland on a permanent basis and signed a four-year contract.

=== Anderlecht ===
On 15 January 2023, Dreyer signed a four-and-a-half-year contract with Anderlecht in Belgium.

=== San Diego FC ===
On 22 January 2025, it was confirmed that Dreyer had been sold to American MLS club San Diego FC on a three-year deal. The club already had two of Dreyer's compatriots, namely Jeppe Tverskov and Marcus Ingvartsen. Dreyer made his debut for San Diego in the club's first-ever game, and subsequently scored the club's first-ever goal as part of a brace in a 2–0 win over reigning champions LA Galaxy on 23 February.

== International career ==
In November 2020, he was called up to Kasper Hjulmand's senior squad for the friendly against Sweden due to several cancellations from, among others, the Danish national team players playing in England, due to the COVID-19 restrictions, as well as a case of COVID-19 in the squad, which had put several national team players in quarantine.

He made his debut on 12 November 2021 in a World Cup qualifier against the Faroe Islands.

On 30 May 2024, Dreyer was named in the list of 26 Danish players selected by Kasper Hjulmand to take part in UEFA Euro 2024.

== Career statistics ==
=== Club ===
As of match played 7 November 2026

Appearances and goals by club, season and competition
Club	Season	League			National cup (Note: Includes Danish Cup, Scottish Cup, KNVB Cup, Belgian Cup)		Continental		Other		Total	
Club	Season	Division	Apps	Goals	Apps	Goals	Apps	Goals	Apps	Goals	Apps	Goals
Esbjerg fB	2016–17	Danish Superliga	6	1	0	0	—		4 (Note: Appearances in Danish Superliga play-offs)	0	10	1
Esbjerg fB	2017–18	Danish 1. Division	31	18	1	0	—		2	3	34	21
Esbjerg fB	2018–19	Danish Superliga	4	1	0	0	—		—		4	1
Esbjerg fB	Total		41	20	1	0	—		6	3	48	23
Brighton & Hove Albion	2018–19	Premier League	0	0	0	0	—		0	0	0	0
Brighton & Hove Albion	2019–20	Premier League	0	0	—		—		—		0	0
Brighton & Hove Albion	Total		0	0	0	0	—		—		0	0
St Mirren (loan)	2018–19	Scottish Premiership	10	1	1	0	—		—		11	1
Heerenveen (loan)	2019–20	Eredivisie	11	1	2	0	—		—		13	1
Midtjylland	2019–20	Danish Superliga	16	4	0	0	—		—		16	4
Midtjylland	2020–21	Danish Superliga	31	8	4	0	10 (Note: Appearances in UEFA Champions League)	3	—		45	11
Midtjylland	2021–22 (Note: Part of this season spent on loan from Rubin Kazan)	Danish Superliga	16	8	3	2	3	0	—		22	10
Midtjylland	Total		63	20	7	2	13	3	—		83	25
Rubin Kazan	2021–22	Russian Premier League	14	8	0	0	—		—		14	8
Midtjylland	2022–23	Danish Superliga	16	8	1	0	10 (Note: Four appearances in UEFA Champions League, six appearances and two goals in UEFA Europa League)	2	—		27	10
Anderlecht	2022–23	Belgian Pro League	14	4	0	0	6 (Note: Appearances in UEFA Europa Conference League)	1	—		20	5
Anderlecht	2023–24	Belgian Pro League	37	19	2	2	—		—		39	21
Anderlecht	2024–25	Belgian Pro League	18	3	3	1	7 (Note: Appearances in UEFA Europa League)	1	0	0	28	5
Anderlecht	Total		69	26	5	3	12	2	—		87	31
San Diego FC	2025	MLS	34	19	—		—		7 (Note: Two appearances in Leagues Cup, five appearances and four goals in MLS Cup playoffs)	4	41	23
San Diego FC	2026	MLS	33	15	—		4 (Note: Appearances in CONCACAF Champions Cup)	1	2 (Note: Appearances in Leagues Cup)	0	39	16
San Diego FC	Total		67	34	—		4	1	9	4	80	39
Career total			289	118	16	4	39	8	15	7	363	138

=== International ===
As of match played 31 March 2026

Appearances and goals by national team and year
National team	Year	Apps	Goals
Denmark	2021	2	0
Denmark	2022	0	0
Denmark	2023	0	0
Denmark	2024	1	0
Denmark	2025	5	3
Denmark	2026	1	0
Total		9	3

Denmark score listed first, score column indicates score after each Dreyer goal.

List of international goals scored by Anders Dreyer
No.	Date	Venue	Cap	Opponent	Score	Result	Competition
1	10 June 2025	Odense Stadium, Odense, Denmark	5	Lithuania	5–0	5–0	Friendly
2	9 October 2025	ZTE Arena, Zalaegerszeg, Hungary	7	Belarus	5–0	6–0	2026 FIFA World Cup qualification
3	9 October 2025	ZTE Arena, Zalaegerszeg, Hungary	7	Belarus	6–0	6–0	2026 FIFA World Cup qualification

== Honours ==
Esbjerg fB

- Danish 1st Division play-offs: 2018

FC Midtjylland

- Danish Superliga: 2019–20
- Danish Cup: 2021–22

Individual

- Danish Superliga Player of the Month: February 2020
- Anderlecht Player of the Season: 2023–24
- MLS All-Star: 2025, 2026
- MLS Player of the Month: June 2025, August 2025
- MLS Newcomer of the Year: 2025
- MLS Best XI: 2025
