= Zeno Debast =

Belgian footballer (born 2003)

- Debast with Belgium in 2026

Personal information
- Full name: Zeno Koen Debast
- Date of birth: 24 October 2003 (age 23)
- Place of birth: Halle, Belgium
- Height: 1.91 m (6 ft 3 in)
- Positions: Centre-back; defensive midfielder

Team information
- Current team: Sporting CP
- Number: 6

Youth career
- 2008–2010: KSK Halle
- 2010–2021: Anderlecht

Senior career*
Years	Team	Apps	(Gls)
2021–2024	Anderlecht	78	(0)
2024–	Sporting CP	53	(2)

International career^{‡}
2018	Belgium U15	8	(0)
2019	Belgium U16	1	(0)
2019	Belgium U17	2	(0)
2021	Belgium U19	6	(0)
2023	Belgium U21	4	(0)
2022–	Belgium	26	(1)
- * Club domestic league appearances and goals as of 23:07, 19 September 2026 (UTC) ‡ National team caps and goals as of 03:30, 1 April 2026 (UTC)

Zeno Koen Debast (Dutch pronunciation: [ˈzeːnoː dəˈbɑst]; born 24 October 2003) is a Belgian professional footballer who plays as a centre-back or defensive midfielder for Primeira Liga club Sporting CP and the Belgium national team.

== Club career ==
=== Anderlecht ===
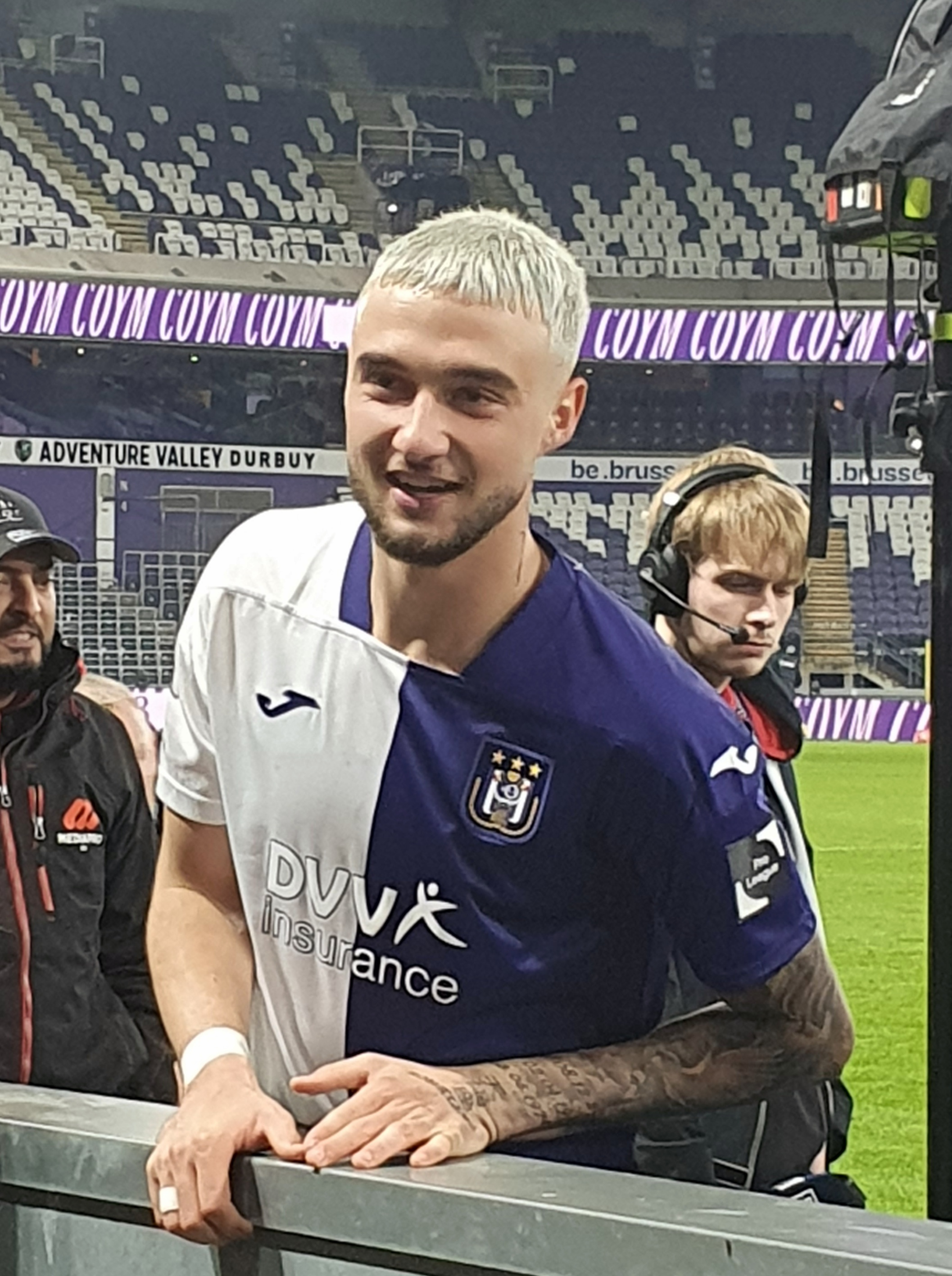
Debast with Anderlecht in 2024

Debast is a youth product of Anderlecht, signing his first contract in October 2019. He made his professional debut on 2 May 2021, in a 2–2 Belgian First Division A draw against Club Brugge.

On 11 June 2024, during an interview for Het Laatste Nieuws, Debast confirmed that he had agreed personal terms to join Portuguese side Sporting CP, effectively beginning from the start of the 2024–25 season.

=== Sporting CP ===
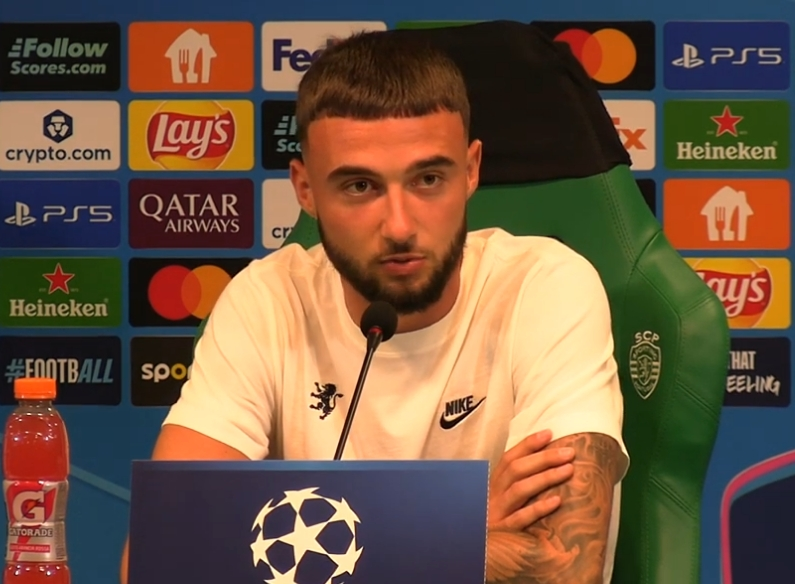
Debast during a press conference with Sporting CP in 2025

On 4 July 2024, Debast signed a five-year contract with Portuguese Primeira Liga side Sporting CP, for a fee of €15.5 million, plus €5.5 million in add-ons, and a 15% sell-on clause in favor of Anderlecht. On 7 August, he made his debut for the club, where he committed two defensive errors, that led to rivals Porto first and second goals in their 4–3 loss in the 2024 Supertaça Cândido de Oliveira. This resulted in him losing his starting spot, however, on 17 September with regular starter Eduardo Quaresma being sidelined with a knee injury, Debast was entrusted back to the starting eleven, scoring his first goal for the club, and the first goal of his career, by netting a shot from outside the box in Sporting's 2–0 victory over Lille during the inaugural matchday of the newly formatted Champions League league phase.

== International career ==
Debast with Belgium in 2026

In September 2022, Debast received his first call-up to the Belgian senior squad for the 2022–23 UEFA Nations League matches against Wales and Netherlands. He debuted against the former opponent on 22 September that ended in a 2–1 victory.

On 10 November 2022, Debast was also called up to the 26-man Belgium squad for the 2022 FIFA World Cup.

On 28 May 2024, Debast was named in Domenico Tedesco's squad for UEFA Euro 2024.

On 28 March 2026, Debast scored his first international goal for Belgium against the United States, equalising the score 1–1 in an eventual 5–2 friendly win. On 15 May, he was named in the 26-man squad for the 2026 FIFA World Cup. Debast made no appearances in the tournament, as Belgium were eliminated in the quarterfinals after a 2–1 loss to Spain.

== Career statistics ==
=== Club ===
As of match played 19 September 2026

Appearances and goals by club, season and competition
Club	Season	League			National cup (Note: Includes Belgian Cup, Taça de Portugal)		League cup (Note: Includes Taça da Liga)		Europe		Other		Total	
Club	Season	Division	Apps	Goals	Apps	Goals	Apps	Goals	Apps	Goals	Apps	Goals	Apps	Goals
Anderlecht	2020–21	Belgian Pro League	2	0	0	0	—		—		—		2	0
Anderlecht	2021–22	Belgian Pro League	5	0	0	0	—		0	0	—		5	0
Anderlecht	2022–23	Belgian Pro League	34	0	2	0	—		13 (Note: Appearances in UEFA Europa Conference League)	0	—		49	0
Anderlecht	2023–24	Belgian Pro League	37	0	3	0	—		—		—		40	0
Anderlecht	Total		78	0	5	0	—		13	0	—		96	0
Sporting CP	2024–25	Primeira Liga	31	0	6	1	2	0	8 (Note: Appearances in UEFA Champions League)	1	1 (Note: Appearance in Supertaça Cândido de Oliveira)	0	48	2
Sporting CP	2025–26	Primeira Liga	17	0	2	0	0	0	4	0	1	0	24	0
Sporting CP	2026–27	Primeira Liga	5	0	0	0	0	0	1	0	—		6	0
Sporting CP	Total		53	0	8	1	2	0	13	1	2	0	78	2
Career total			131	0	13	1	2	0	26	1	2	0	174	2

=== International ===
As of match played 31 March 2026

Appearances and goals by national team and year
National team	Year	Apps	Goals
Belgium	2022	3	0
Belgium	2023	2	0
Belgium	2024	11	0
Belgium	2025	8	0
Belgium	2026	2	1
Total		26	1

Belgium score listed first, score column indicates score after each Debast goal.

List of international goals scored by Zeno Debast
No.	Date	Venue	Opponent	Score	Result	Competition
1	28 March 2026	Mercedes-Benz Stadium, Atlanta, United States	United States	1–1	5–2	Friendly

== Honours ==
Sporting CP

- Primeira Liga: 2024–25
- Taça de Portugal: 2024–25
