= Mario Stroeykens =

DR Congolese footballer (born 2004)

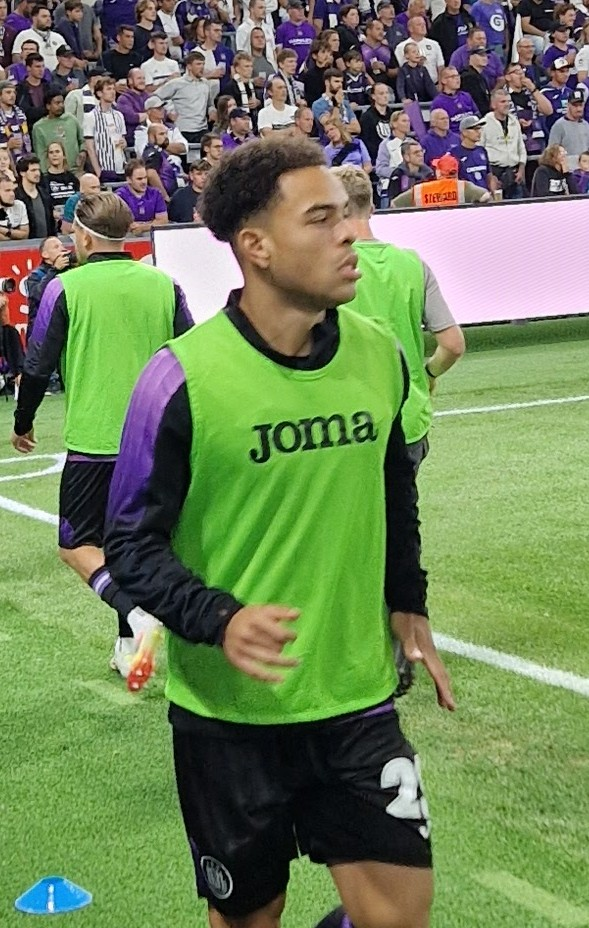
- Stroeykens with Anderlecht in 2025

Personal information
- Full name: Mario Margriet Stroeykens Koho Pungu
- Birth name: Mario Sven Margriet Stroeykens
- Date of birth: 29 September 2004 (age 22)
- Place of birth: Zellik, Belgium
- Height: 1.80 m (5 ft 11 in)
- Position: Attacking midfielder

Team information
- Current team: Anderlecht
- Number: 29

Youth career
- –2020: Anderlecht

Senior career*
Years	Team	Apps	(Gls)
2020–	Anderlecht	124	(14)

International career
2019	Belgium U15	1	(0)
2019	Belgium U16	1	(0)
2021–2023	Belgium U19	13	(5)
2022	Belgium U20	2	(1)
2023–2024	Belgium U21	12	(0)
- * Club domestic league appearances and goals as of 25 October 2026

Mario Margriet Stroeykens Koho Pungu (born 29 September 2004) is a professional footballer who plays as an attacking midfielder for Belgian Pro League club Anderlecht. Born in Belgium, he plays for the DR Congo national team.

== Club career ==
On 15 January 2021, at 16 years, 3 months and 17 days, Stroeykens made his professional debut for RSC Anderlecht, in a 2–0 away loss to Eupen, under then manager Vincent Kompany.

On 9 October 2022, he scored his first goal for the club in a 3–1 away win against K.V. Mechelen. Under different managers Stroeykens never really broke through, often being a substitute or playing for Anderlecht's U23 side, the RSCA Futures.

It was under manager Brian Riemer, after signing a contract extension until 2026 in the 2023–2024 season that he really broke through, playing 40 games in all competitions, scoring 6 goals and providing 6 assists.

He was very important for Anderlecht's challenge for the title that season, only losing first and second spot on the last 2 Matchdays of the Belgian Pro League Champions’ play-offs after a 0–1 home loss to rivals Club Brugge and a 3–1 away loss to Royal Antwerp FC. He had some notable performances in important moments for Paars-Wit, and he demonstrated his talent on 7 December 2023, by scoring a stunning goal from outside the box in the Belgian Clasico against Standard Liège in the Belgian Cup, leading his side to a 2–0 home win.

== International career ==
Born in Belgium, to Belgian father and Congolese-French mother, Stroeykens holds both Congolese and French nationalities from his parents, Stroeykens was a former youth international for Belgium.

On 1 November 2025, Stroeykens was called up for the first time to play for the DR Congo national team in the 2026 FIFA World Cup qualifying play-offs against Cameroon. 13 days later, his request to switch international allegiance to the DR Congo was approved by FIFA. However, he was unable to make his senior debut shortly afterwards due to injury, which later also forced him to withdraw from the DR Congo squad for the 2025 Africa Cup of Nations.

== Career statistics ==
As of match played 25 October 2026

Appearances and goals by club, season and competition
Club	Season	League			Belgian Cup		Europe		Total	
Club	Season	Division	Apps	Goals	Apps	Goals	Apps	Goals	Apps	Goals
Anderlecht	2020–21	Belgian Pro League	3	0	1	0	—		4	0
Anderlecht	2021–22	Belgian Pro League	7	0	0	0	1 (Note: Appearances in UEFA Europa Conference League)	0	8	0
Anderlecht	2022–23	Belgian Pro League	26	4	2	1	13	0	41	5
Anderlecht	2023–24	Belgian Pro League	38	5	2	1	—		40	6
Anderlecht	2024–25	Belgian Pro League	27	4	3	0	9 (Note: Appearances in UEFA Europa League)	1	39	5
Anderlecht	2025–26	Belgian Pro League	21	1	2	0	5 (Note: Two appearances in UEFA Europa League, three appearances in UEFA Conference League)	0	28	1
Anderlecht	2026–27	Belgian Pro League	2	0	1	0	2	0	5	0
Career total			124	14	11	2	30	1	165	17
