= 2022–23 RSC Anderlecht season =

Anderlecht
2022–23 season
- Chairman: Wouter Vandenhaute
- Manager: Brian Riemer
- Stadium: Constant Vanden Stock Stadium
- Pro League: 11th
- Belgian Cup: Seventh round
- UEFA Europa Conference League: Quarter-finals
- Top goalscorer: League: Islam Slimani (8); All: Fábio Silva (11)
colours	colours	colours

The 2022–23 season was the 115th season in the history of R.S.C. Anderlecht and their 87th consecutive season in the top flight. The club participated in the Belgian Pro League, the Belgian Cup, and the UEFA Europa Conference League.

== Players ==
=== First-team squad ===
As of 28 April 2023

Note: Flags indicate national team as defined under FIFA eligibility rules; some limited exceptions apply. Players may hold more than one non-FIFA nationality.

No.	Pos.	Nation	Player
3	DF	BEL	Hannes Delcroix
5	DF	SEN	Moussa N'Diaye
7	MF	BEL	Francis Amuzu
9	FW	BEL	Benito Raman
10	MF	BEL	Yari Verschaeren
11	MF	ISR	Lior Refaelov
13	FW	ALG	Islam Slimani
14	DF	BEL	Jan Vertonghen
16	GK	NED	Bart Verbruggen
18	MF	GHA	Majeed Ashimeru
21	MF	GUI	Amadou Diawara
24	MF	NGR	Ishaq Abdulrazak
25	MF	FRA	Adrien Trebel

No.	Pos.	Nation	Player
26	GK	BEL	Colin Coosemans
27	MF	BEL	Noah Sadiki
29	MF	BEL	Mario Stroeykens
30	GK	BEL	Hendrik Van Crombrugge (captain)
32	FW	ECU	Nilson Angulo
33	GK	BEL	Rik Vercauteren
33	MR	DEN	Anders Dreyer
54	DF	BEL	Killian Sardella
55	DF	BEL	Marco Kana
56	DF	BEL	Zeno Debast
61	MF	NOR	Kristian Arnstad
62	DF	PAN	Michael Amir Murillo
63	GK	BEL	Timon Vanhoutte

=== Other players under contract ===
Note: Flags indicate national team as defined under FIFA eligibility rules; some limited exceptions apply. Players may hold more than one non-FIFA nationality.

No.	Pos.	Nation	Player
—	MF	BEL	Aristote Nkaka
19	FW	SLE	Mustapha Bundu

=== Out on loan ===
Note: Flags indicate national team as defined under FIFA eligibility rules; some limited exceptions apply. Players may hold more than one non-FIFA nationality.

No.	Pos.	Nation	Player
—	DF	UKR	Bohdan Mykhaylichenko (at Shakhtar Donetsk until 30 June 2023)
—	FW	GHA	Mo Dauda (on loan to CD Tenerife)

== Transfers ==
=== In ===
No.	Pos	Player	Transferred from	Fee	Date	Source
32	MF	Nilson Angulo (ECU)	LDU Quito (ECU)	€1,900,000	21 June 2022	
24	MF	Ishaq Abdulrazak (NGA)	IFK Norrköping (SWE)	€3,000,000	1 July 2022	
21	MF	Amadou Diawara (GUI)	Roma (ITA)	€1,890,000	31 August 2022	
14	DF	Jan Vertonghen (BEL)	Benfica (POR)	Free	2 September 2022	
33	MF	Anders Dreyer (DEN)	FC Midtjylland (DEN)	€4,200,000	15 January 2023	
13	FW	Islam Slimani (ALG)	Brest (FRA)	Free	31 January 2023	

== Pre-season and friendlies ==
Win Draw Loss

25 June 2022 Friendly	Anderlecht (Belgium)	0–1	(Belgium) Sint-Truiden	Brussels
17:00 CEST (UTC+2)		Report		Stadium: RSCA Football Academy

2 July 2022 Friendly	Roda JC (Netherlands)	0–6	(Belgium) Anderlecht	Kerkrade
14:00 CEST (UTC+2)		Report		Stadium: Parkstad Limburg Stadion

9 July 2022 Friendly	Anderlecht (Belgium)	3–1	(Denmark) Nordsjælland	Brussels
14:00 CEST (UTC+2)				Stadium: RSCA Football Academy

16 July 2022 Friendly	Anderlecht (Belgium)	2–3	(France) Lyon	Brussels
15:00 CEST (UTC+2)	Colassin 13'; Stassin 73'		Dembélé 36'; Cherki 54'; Augarreau 83'	Stadium: Lotto Park

16 July 2022 Friendly	Anderlecht (Belgium)	3–0	(France) Lyon	Brussels
20:00 CEST (UTC+2)	Refaelov 2'; Esposito 62'; Amuzu 83'			Stadium: Lotto Park

3 December 2022 Friendly	OFI (Greece)	1–1	(Belgium) Anderlecht	Heraklion, Greece
19:00 EET (UTC+2)	Balogiannis 9'	Report	Raman 49'	Stadium: Theodoros Vardinogiannis Stadium

6 December 2022 Friendly	Panetolikos (Greece)	1–2	(Belgium) Anderlecht	Greece
14:00 EET (UTC+2)	Shengelia 89'	Report	Murillo 6'; Arnstad 87'

10 December 2022 Friendly	Real Sociedad (Spain)	Cancelled	(Belgium) Anderlecht	San Sebastián
19:00 CET (UTC+1)				Stadium: Anoeta
Note: The match was cancelled due to the high number of injuries among Anderlecht players.

14 December 2022 Friendly	Anderlecht (Belgium)	1–1	(Poland) Raków Częstochowa	Brussels
13:00 CET (UTC+1)	Refaelov 16'	Report	Musiolik 90+3'	Stadium: RSCA Football Academy; Attendance: 0

== Competitions ==
=== Overall record ===
Competition	First match	Last match	Starting round	Final position	Record							
Competition	First match	Last match	Starting round	Final position	Pld	W	D	L	GF	GA	GD	Win %
Pro League	24 July 2022	23 April 2023	Matchday 1	11th	34	13	7	14	49	46	+3	38.24
Belgian Cup	10 November 2022	21 December 2022	Sixth round	Seventh round	2	0	1	1	2	3	−1	0.00
UEFA Europa Conference League	4 August 2022	20 April 2023	Third qualifying round	Quarter-finals	16	8	3	5	18	11	+7	50.00
Total					52	21	11	20	69	60	+9	40.38

Last updated: 23 April 2023
Source: Soccerway

=== Pro League ===
==== League table ====
Pos	Team	Pld	W	D	L	GF	GA	GD	Pts
9	Charleroi	34	14	6	14	45	52	−7	48
10	OH Leuven	34	13	9	12	56	48	+8	48
11	Anderlecht	34	13	7	14	49	46	+3	46
12	Sint-Truiden	34	11	9	14	37	40	−3	42
13	Mechelen	34	11	7	16	49	63	−14	40

Source: Jupiler Pro League (in Dutch), Soccerway
Rules for classification: 1) Points; 2) Matches won; 3) Goal difference; 4) Goals scored; 5) Away matches won; 6) Away goal difference; 7) Away goals scored; 8) Play-off.

==== Results summary ====
Overall								Home						Away					
Pld	W	D	L	GF	GA	GD	Pts	W	D	L	GF	GA	GD	W	D	L	GF	GA	GD
15	6	2	7	26	18	+8	20	4	1	3	15	9	+6	2	1	4	11	9	+2

Last updated: 6 November 2022.
Source: Jupiler Pro League

==== Results by round ====
Round	1	2	3	4	5	6	7	8	9	10	11	12	13	14	15	16	17	18	19	20	21	22	23	24	25	26	27	28	29	30	31	32	33	34
Ground	H	A	H	A	A	H	H	A	H	H	A	H	A	A	H	A	H	A	H	A	H	A	H	A	H	A	H	A	H	A	A	H	A	H
Result	W	L	W	W	L	L	D	L	W	L	W	L	L	L	W	D	L	W	L	D	L	W	D	W	W	D	D	L	W	W	W	D	L	L
Position	4	6	3	3	5	7	8	9	8	10	9	9	9	12	10	11	11	11	11	13	13	12	11	10	10	9	9	10	9	8	8	9	10	11

Updated to match(es) played on 23 April 2023. Source: Jupiler Pro League
A = Away; H = Home; W = Win; D = Draw; L = Loss

==== Matches ====
The league fixtures were announced on 22 June 2022.

24 July 2022 1	Anderlecht	2–0	Oostende	Brussels
18:30 CEST (UTC+2)	Ashimeru 39'; Silva 88'	Report		Stadium: Lotto Park; Attendance: 18,000; Referee: Alexandre Boucaut

30 July 2022 2	Cercle Brugge	1–0	Anderlecht	Bruges
16:00 CEST (UTC+2)	Torres 75'	Report		Stadium: Jan Breydel Stadium; Attendance: 4,000; Referee: Jan Boterberg

7 August 2022 3	Anderlecht	3–1	Seraing	Brussels
18:30 CEST (UTC+2)	Amuzu 4', 16'; Silva 30'	Report	Sissoko 57'	Stadium: Lotto Park; Attendance: 18,000; Referee: Lawrence Visser

14 August 2022 4	Sint-Truiden	0–3	Anderlecht	Sint-Truiden
13:30 CEST (UTC+2)		Report	Refaelov 43'; Silva 45+5'; Raman 74'	Stadium: Stayen; Attendance: 6,898; Referee: Nicolas Laforge

28 August 2022 6	Union Saint-Gilloise	2–1	Anderlecht	Brussels
18:30 CEST (UTC+2)	Boniface 2'; Vanzeir 31' (Nieuwkoop); Van der Heyden (yellow card) 59'; Nieuwkoop (yellow card) 69'	Report	Murillo 12' (Arnstad); Kana (yellow card) 41'	Stadium: Joseph Marien Stadium; Attendance: 7,646; Referee: Nathan Verboomen

1 September 2022 5	Anderlecht	0–1	Gent	Brussels
20:30 CEST (UTC+2)	Stroeykens (yellow card) 72'; Silva (yellow card) 85'	Report	Torunarigha (yellow card) 61'; Cuypers 69' (pen.); Hong Hyun-seok (yellow card) 74'	Stadium: Lotto Park; Attendance: 17,500; Referee: Erik Lambrechts
Note: Match was postponed due to the UEFA Europa League play-off round.

4 September 2022 7	Anderlecht	2–2	OH Leuven	Brussels
13:30 CEST (UTC+2)	Diawara (yellow card) 43'; Silva (yellow card) 61' (goal) 85'; Duranville 71' (Ashimeru); Sadiki (yellow card) 90+2'	Report	Þorsteinsson 19' (Al-Taamari); Malinov (yellow card) 54'; Al-Taamari 74' (Maertens)	Stadium: Constant Vanden Stock Stadium; Attendance: 17,500; Referee: Jonathan Lardot

11 September 2022 8	Westerlo	2–1	Anderlecht	Westerlo
13:30 CEST (UTC+2)	Vetokele 6' (De Cuyper); Reynolds (yellow card) 61'; Akbunar 82' (De Cuyper) (yellow card) 84'	Report	Hoedt (yellow card) 59'; Stroeykens (yellow card) 65'; Esposito 70' (Refaelov); Murillo (yellow card) 89'	Stadium: Het Kuipje; Attendance: 8,035; Referee: Wim Smet

18 September 2022 9	Anderlecht	4–1	Kortrijk	Brussels
21:00 CEST (UTC+2)	Verschareren 27' (Murillo); Ashimeru 59' (Murillo); Arnstad (yellow card) 65'; Vertonghen 64' (Refaelov); Refaelov 75' (pen.)	Report	Dessoleil (yellow card) 29'; Vandendriessche (yellow card) 53'; Selemani 61'	Stadium: Lotto Park; Attendance: 16,000; Referee: Nathan Verboomen

2 October 2022 10	Anderlecht	0–1	Charleroi	Brussels
13:30 CEST (UTC+2)	Arnstad (yellow card) 43'; Vertonghen (yellow card) 45+6'	Report	Ilaimaharitra (yellow card) 5'; Morioka 65' (Nkuba); Zorgane (yellow card) 82'	Stadium: Lotto Park; Attendance: 19,000; Referee: Lothar D'hondt

9 October 2022 11	Mechelen	1–3	Anderlecht	Mechelen
13:30 CEST (UTC+2)	Vanlerberghe 15' (pen.); Soelle Soelle (yellow card) 90+1'	Report	Diawara (yellow card) 9'; Refaelov (yellow card) 31'; Stroeykens 46' (Amuzu) 67' (yellow card) 79' Murillo (yellow card) 89'; Silva; Van Crombrugge (yellow card) 83'	Stadium: AFAS-stadion Achter de Kazerne; Attendance: 16,125; Referee: Bram Van Driessche

16 October 2022 12	Anderlecht	0–1	Club Brugge	Brussels
18:30 CEST (UTC+2)	Vertonghen (yellow card) 75'	Report	Odoi (yellow card) 39'; Nielsen 69' (Vanaken); Meijer (yellow card) 90+1'; Sylla (red card) 90+4'; Onyedika (yellow card) 90+6'	Stadium: Lotto Park; Attendance: 18,000; Referee: Lawrence Visser

20 October 2022 13	Zulte Waregem	3–2	Anderlecht	Waregem
13:30 CEST (UTC+2)	Vossen 5' (Dismas) (yellow card) 64'; Offor (yellow card) 15'; Ciranni (yellow card) 19'; Derijck (yellow card) 39'; Tambedou (yellow card) 72'; Sissako 80' (Rommens) (yellow card) 90+3'; Ndour (yellow card) 90+2'; Gano 90+5' (Ciranni)	Report	Debast (yellow card) 45+1'; Silva 71' (pen.); Diawara 58' (Verschaeren); Arnstad (yellow card) 72' (red card)	Stadium: Elindus Arena; Attendance: 8,235; Referee: Nicolas Laforge

23 October 2022 14	Standard Liège	5–0	Anderlecht	Liège
18:30 CEST (UTC+2)	Raskin 20' (Laifis); Fossey 27' (Dussenne); Dønnum (yellow card) 43'; Zinckernagel 56' (Balikwisha)	Report	Verschaeren 2' (Refaelov)	Stadium: Stade Maurice Dufrasne; Attendance: 26,271; Referee: Bram Van Driessche
Note: Match stopped at 3–1 in the second half due to Anderlecht supporters throwing pyrotechnics on the pitch. Standard was awarded a 5-0 forfeit win, but both clubs were penalized for taking insufficient measures to prevent the event. Anderlecht was fined €10.000, forced to play two home matches without supporters, and given two provisional home matches without supporters. Standard was fined €10.000 and given one provisional home match without supporters.

30 October 2022 15	Anderlecht	4–2	Eupen	Brussels
14:30 CEST (UTC+2)	Amuzu 14' (Hoedt); Refaelov 19' (Murillo) 65' (Ashimeru); Murillo (yellow card) 67'; Silva (yellow card) 85'; El Hadj 87' (Ashimeru)	Report	Wakaso (yellow card) 17'; Hoedt 44' (o.g.); Alloh (yellow card) 59'	Stadium: Lotto Park; Attendance: 18,000; Referee: Jan Boterberg

6 November 2022 16	Royal Antwerp	0–0	Anderlecht	Antwerp
18:30 CEST (UTC+2)	Gerkens (yellow card) 45+3'; Pacho (yellow card) 69'	Report	Debast (yellow card) 52'; Amuzu (yellow card) 74'; Trebel (yellow card) 90+3'	Stadium: Bosuilstadion; Attendance: 15,917; Referee: Jasper Vergoote

13 November 2022 17	Anderlecht	0–2	Genk	Brussels
18:45 CEST (UTC+2)	N'Diaye (yellow card) 25'; Trebel (yellow card) 45+3'	Report	Hrošovský (yellow card) 15'; Onuachu 19' (Muñoz); Cuesta (yellow card) 28'; Arteaga 53' (Paintsil) (red card) 74'; McKenzie (yellow card) 86'	Stadium: Lotto Park; Attendance: 19,500; Referee: Bram Van Driessche

26 December 2022 18	Charleroi	0–1	Anderlecht	Charleroi
20:45 CEST (UTC+2)	Nkuba (yellow card) 49'; Benbouali (yellow card) 45'	Report	Arnstad (yellow card) 45+1'; Zorgane 6' (o.g.)	Stadium: Stade du Pays de Charleroi; Attendance: 10,262; Referee: Lawrence Visser

8 January 2023 19	Anderlecht	1–3	Union Saint-Gilloise	Brussels
18:30 CEST (UTC+2)	N'Diaye (red card) 10'; Ashimeru (yellow card) 20'; Diawara (yellow card) 38'; Vertonghen (yellow card) 45'; Silva 64' (Amuzu); Sardella (yellow card) 80'; Amuzu (yellow card) 81'	Report	Nieuwkoop (yellow card) 12'; Burgess (yellow card) 42'; Kandouss (yellow card) 45'; Puertas 81'; Arnstad 87' (o.g.); Adingra 90' (Boniface)	Stadium: Lotto Park; Attendance: 19,503; Referee: Bram Van Driessche

15 January 2023 20	Club Brugge	1–1	Anderlecht	Bruges
13:30 CEST (UTC+2)	Yaremchuk (yellow card) 7'; Nielsen 68' (Buchanan); Buchanan (yellow card) 71'	Report	Sardella (yellow card) 51'; Arnstad (yellow card) 70'; Murillo (yellow card) 73'; Mechele 79' (o.g.)	Stadium: Jan Breydel Stadium; Attendance: 25,378; Referee: Nathan Verboomen

18 January 2023 21	Anderlecht	2–3	Zulte Waregem	Brussels
20:45 CEST (UTC+2)	Raman 36' (Amuzu); Amuzu (yellow card) 90+6'	Report	Gano 11' (Fadera); Rommens (yellow card) 27'; Ciranni (yellow card) 58'; Ndour 62' (Vormer); Fadera 75'	Stadium: Lotto Park; Referee: Wesli De Cremer

22 January 2023 22	Seraing	0–1	Anderlecht	Seraing
16:00 CEST (UTC+2)	Lahssaini (yellow card) 63'; Tshibuabua (yellow card) 86'; Sylla (yellow card) 89'	Report	Arnstad (yellow card) 59'; Stroeykens 76' (Dreyer)	Stadium: Stade du Pairay; Attendance: 3,348; Referee: Kevin Van Damme

29 January 2023 23	Anderlecht	0–0	Antwerp	Brussels
13:30 CEST (UTC+2)	Raman (yellow card) 63' (yellow-red card) 76'; Debast (yellow card) 73'; Ashimeru (yellow card) 90+1'	Report	Stengs (yellow card) 42' (yellow-red card) 62'; Muja (yellow card) 51'; De Laet (yellow card) 63'	Stadium: Lotto Park; Attendance: 17,000; Referee: Erik Lambrechts

3 February 2023 24	Oostende	0–2	Anderlecht	Ostend
20:45 CEST (UTC+2)	Tanghe (yellow card) 27'; Rodin (yellow card) 56'; Bätzner (yellow card) 84'	Report	Murillo 31' (Stroeykens); Dreyer 89' (Verschaeren); Refaelov (yellow card) 90+4'	Stadium: Diaz Arena; Attendance: 4,597; Referee: Wesli De Cremer

12 February 2023 25	Anderlecht	3–1	Sint-Truiden	Brussels
16:00 CEST (UTC+2)	Ashimeru (yellow card) 35'; Raman 66'; Slimani 81' (Amuzu); Dreyer 83'	Report	Bauer (yellow card) 44'; Gruno 88' (Hara)	Stadium: Lotto Park; Attendance: 13,706; Referee: Bert Put

19 February 2023 26	Kortrijk	2–2	Anderlecht	Kortrijk
18:30 CEST (UTC+2)	Kadri (yellow card) 29' (goal) 57'; Watanabe (yellow card) 45'; Silva 67' (Selemani)	Report	Dreyer 89' (Ashimeru); Murillo 83'	Stadium: Guldensporenstadion; Attendance: 8,798; Referee: Nathan Verboomen

26 February 2023 27	Anderlecht	2–2	Standard Liège	Brussels
18:30 CEST (UTC+2)	Slimani 34' (pen.) 38' (Amuzu) (yellow card) 55'; Amuzu (yellow card) 65'	Report	Ohio 14' (yellow card) 65'; Melegoni (yellow card) 44'	Stadium: Lotto Park; Attendance: 17,976; Referee: Jonathan Lardot

5 March 2023 28	Gent	1–0	Anderlecht	Ghent
18:30 CEST (UTC+2)	Fortuna (yellow card) 45+1'; Orban 57' (Castro-Montes)	Report	Diawara (yellow card) 53' (yellow-red card) 76'; Verschaeren (yellow card) 53'; Angulo (yellow card) 90+3'	Stadium: Ghelamco Arenac; Attendance: 17,464; Referee: Lothar D'hondt

12 March 2023 29	Anderlecht	2–0	Cercle Brugge	Brussels
20:15 CEST (UTC+2)	Slimani 9' (Dreyer) 85' (Raman)	Report	Deman (yellow card) 45+1'; Lopes (yellow card) 69'; Denkey (red card) 90'	Stadium: Lotto Park; Attendance: 14,299; Referee: Bert Put

19 March 2023 30	OH Leuven	0–2	Anderlecht	Leuven
17:00 CEST (UTC+2)	Mendyl (yellow card) 32'; Al-Taamari (yellow card) 62'; Schrijvers (yellow card) 81'	Report	Slimani 33' (pen.); Ashimeru (yellow card) 59'; Diawara (yellow card) 62'; Arnstad 90' (Raman)	Stadium: King Power at Den Dreef; Attendance: 9,250; Referee: Kasper Vergoote

2 April 2023 31	Eupen	0–1	Anderlecht	Eupen
16:00 CEST (UTC+2)	Magnée (yellow card) 9'	Report	Raman 50' (Arnstad)	Stadium: Kehrwegstadion; Attendance: 4,943; Referee: Lothar D'hondt

9 April 2023 32	Anderlecht	0–0	Westerlo	Brussels
13:30 CEST (UTC+2)	Slimani (yellow card) 47'; Sardella (yellow card) 88'	Report	Matsuo (yellow card) 37'; Nene (yellow card) 89'; Bolat (yellow card) 90+5'	Stadium: Lotto Park; Attendance: 14,480; Referee: Lawrence Visser

16 April 2023 33	Genk	5–2	Anderlecht	Genk
13:30 CEST (UTC+2)	McKenzie (yellow card) 6'; Preciado (yellow card) 31'; Samatta 36' (Trésor); Ouattara 45+2'; Paintsil 49' (Hrošovský) 87' (Trésor); El Khannous 53' (Paintsil)	Report	Vertonghen (yellow card) 6'; Refaelov (yellow card) 20'; Slimani 43' (Sardella); Diawara (yellow card) 52'; Dreyer 64' (Diawara)	Stadium: Cegeka Arena; Attendance: 19,845; Referee: Erik Lambrechts

23 April 2023 34	Anderlecht	2–3	Mechelen	Brussels
18:30 CEST (UTC+2)	Stroeykens 6' (Sardella); Slimani 53' (Amuzu)	Report	Schoofs 40' (Walsh) 43' (Hairemans); Bates 81' (Schoofs)	Stadium: Lotto Park; Attendance: 15,552; Referee: Nathan Verboomen

=== Belgian Cup ===
10 November 2022 Sixth round	Lierse Kempenzonen	2–2 (a.e.t.) (8–9 p)	Anderlecht	Lier
20:45 CET	Tabekou 24'; Vekemans 78'		Silva 23' (pen.); Stroeykens 45+4'	Stadium: Herman Vanderpoortenstadion
	Penalties
	Raemaekers (penalty scored); Rocha (penalty scored); Schouterden (penalty scored); Brebels (penalty scored); Van Acker (penalty scored); Vekemans (penalty scored); Gillekens (penalty scored); De Schrijver (penalty scored); De Schryver (penalty missed); Libert (penalty missed)		(penalty scored) Refaelov; (penalty scored) Leoni; (penalty scored) Diawara; (penalty scored) Sadiki; (penalty scored) Silva; (penalty scored) Delcroix; (penalty scored) Raman; (penalty scored) Ashimeru; (penalty missed) Lissens; (penalty scored) Verbruggen

21 December 2022 Seventh round	Genk	1–0 (a.e.t.)	Anderlecht	Genk
20:45 CET	Paintsil 96'	Report		Stadium: Cegeka Arena

=== UEFA Europa Conference League ===
==== Third qualifying round ====
The draw for the third qualifying round was held on 18 July 2022.

4 August 2022 First leg	Paide Linnameeskond (Estonia)	0–2	(Belgium) Anderlecht	Tallinn, Estonia
19:45 EEST (UTC+3)		Report	Refaelov 10'; Silva 40'	Stadium: Lilleküla Stadium; Attendance: 7,506; Referee: David Fuxman (Israel)

11 August 2022 Second leg	Anderlecht (Belgium)	3–0 (5–0 agg.)	(Estonia) Paide Linnameeskond	Brussels, Belgium
20:00 CEST (UTC+2)	Silva 62'; Murillo 72', 75'	Report		Stadium: Constant Vanden Stock Stadium; Attendance: 11,235; Referee: Giorgi Kruashvili (Georgia)

==== Play-off round ====
The draw for the play-off round was held on 2 August 2022.

18 August 2022 First leg	Young Boys (Switzerland)	0–1	(Belgium) Anderlecht	Bern, Switzerland
19:00 CEST (UTC+2)		Report	Delcroix 57'	Stadium: Stadion Wankdorf; Attendance: 18,363; Referee: Aleksandar Stavrev (North Macedonia)

25 August 2022 Second leg	Anderlecht (Belgium)	0–1 (a.e.t.) (1–1 agg.) (3–1 p)	(Switzerland) Young Boys	Brussels, Belgium
20:00 CEST (UTC+2)		Report	Elia 26'	Stadium: Constant Vanden Stock Stadium; Attendance: 14,393; Referee: Serhiy Boyko (Ukraine)
	Penalties
	Hoedt (penalty scored); Stroeykens (penalty missed); Sadiki (penalty scored); Esposito (penalty scored)		(penalty scored) Rieder; (penalty missed) Rrudhani; (penalty missed) Imeri; (penalty missed) Lustenberger

==== Group stage ====
The draw for the group stage was held on 26 August 2022.

Pos	Team	Pld	W	D	L	GF	GA	GD	Pts	Qualification	WHU	AND	SIL	FCSB
1	(England) West Ham United	6	6	0	0	13	4	+9	18	Advance to round of 16	—	2–1	1–0	3–1
2	(Belgium) Anderlecht	6	2	2	2	6	5	+1	8	Advance to knockout round play-offs	0–1	—	1–0	2–2
3	(Denmark) Silkeborg	6	2	0	4	12	7	+5	6		2–3	0–2	—	5–0
4	(Romania) FCSB	6	0	2	4	3	18	−15	2		0–3	0–0	0–5	—

Source: UEFA
Rules for classification: Group stage tiebreakers

8 September 2022 1	Anderlecht (Belgium)	1–0	(Denmark) Silkeborg	Brussels
18:45 CEST (UTC+2)	Murillo (yellow card) 64'; Silva 81' (pen.), (yellow card) 82'	Report	Þórðarson (yellow card) 26'; Engel (yellow card) 79'	Stadium: Constant Vanden Stock Stadium; Attendance: 11,557; Referee: István Vad (Hungary)

15 September 2022 2	FCSB (Romania)	0–0	(Belgium) Anderlecht	Bucharest, Romania
22:00 EEST (UTC+3)	Miculescu (yellow card) 19'; Olaru (yellow card) 30'; Compagno (yellow card) 90+1'	Report	Kana (yellow card) 9'; Murillo (yellow card) 32'	Stadium: Arena Națională; Attendance: 29,613; Referee: Sebastian Gishamer (Austria)

6 October 2022 3	Anderlecht (Belgium)	0–1	(England) West Ham United	Brussels
18:45 CEST (UTC+2)	Delcroix (yellow card) 75'	Report	Lanzini (yellow card) 67'; Ogbonna (yellow card) 73'; Scamacca 79'; Coufal (yellow card) 82'; Downes (yellow card) 90+3'	Stadium: Constant Vanden Stock Stadium; Attendance: 17,033; Referee: Novak Simović (Serbia)

13 October 2022 4	West Ham United (England)	2–1	(Belgium) Anderlecht	London, England
21:00 BST (UTC+1)	Benrahma 14'; Bowen 30'; Paquetá (yellow card) 36'; Downes (yellow card) 60'; Johnson (yellow card) 88'	Report	Arnstad (yellow card) 9'; Esposito 89' (pen.)	Stadium: London Stadium; Attendance: 40,767; Referee: Willy Delajod (France)

27 October 2022 5	Anderlecht (Belgium)	2–2	(Romania) FCSB	Brussels
18:45 CEST (UTC+2)	Verschaeren 38'; Murillo (yellow card) 43' (yellow-red card) 90+4'; Vertonghen 75'; Hoedt (yellow card) 88'	Report	Compagno 60', (yellow card) 67'; Dawa 82'; Coman (yellow card) 87'; Miculescu (yellow card) 89'	Stadium: Constant Vanden Stock Stadium; Attendance: 14,226; Referee: Manfredas Lukjančukas (Lithuania)

3 November 2022 6	Silkeborg (Denmark)	0–2	(Belgium) Anderlecht	Silkeborg, Denmark
21:00 CET (UTC+1)	Klynge (red card) 26'; Mattsson (yellow card) 79'	Report	Refaelov 20'; Delcroix (yellow card) 28'; Debast (yellow card) 71'; Silva (yellow card) 86'; Raman 90+4'	Stadium: Silkeborg Stadium; Attendance: 6,810; Referee: Daniele Chiffi (Italy)

==== Knockout phase ====
===== Knockout round play-offs =====
The knockout round play-offs draw was held on 7 November 2022.

16 February 2023 First leg	Ludogorets Razgrad (Bulgaria)	1–0	(Belgium) Anderlecht	Razgrad, Bulgaria
22:00 EET (UTC+2)	Thiago 9'	Report		Stadium: Ludogorets Arena; Attendance: 4,417; Referee: Duje Strukan (Croatia)

23 February 2023 Second leg	Anderlecht (Belgium)	2–1 (3–0 p)	(Bulgaria) Ludogorets Razgrad	Brussels
18:45 CET (UTC+1)	Russo 13' (o.g.); Verschaeren 68'	Report	Thiago 71'	Stadium: Constant Vanden Stock Stadium
	Penalties
	Refaelov (penalty scored); Vertonghen (penalty scored); Verschaeren (penalty scored)		(penalty missed) Pipa; (penalty missed) Yankov; (penalty missed) Naressi

===== Round of 16 =====
The knockout round play-offs draw was held on 24 February 2023.

9 March 2023 First leg	Anderlecht (Belgium)	1–1	(Spain) Villarreal	Brussels, Belgium
18:45 CET (UTC+1)	Dreyer 57'	Report	Trigueros 28', (yellow card) 37'	Stadium: Constant Vanden Stock Stadium; Attendance: 15,265; Referee: Bartosz Frankowski (Poland)

16 March 2023 Second leg	Villarreal (Spain)	0–1 (1–2 agg.)	(Belgium) Anderlecht	Villarreal
21:00 CET (UTC+1)		Report	Slimani 73'	Stadium: Estadio de la Cerámica; Attendance: 16,212; Referee: Marco Di Bello (Italy)

===== Quarter-finals =====
13 April 2023 First leg	Anderlecht (Belgium)	2–0	(Netherlands) AZ	Brussels, Belgium
	Murillo 22'; Ashimeru 70'	Report		Stadium: Constant Vanden Stock Stadium; Attendance: 18,157; Referee: Daniel Siebert (Germany)

20 April 2023 Second leg	AZ (Netherlands)	2–0 (a.e.t.) (2–2 agg.) (4–1 p)	(Belgium) Anderlecht	Alkmaar
	Pavlidis 5' (pen.), 13'	Report		Stadium: AFAS Stadion; Attendance: 19,500; Referee: Davide Massa (Italy)
	Penalties
	Clasie (penalty scored); Sugawara (penalty scored); Reijnders (penalty scored); Meerdink (penalty scored)		(penalty missed) Vertonghen; (penalty scored) Kana; (penalty missed) Sardella
Note: 2–2 on aggregate. AZ won 4–1 on penalties.

== Statistics ==
=== Appearances and goals ===
No.	Pos	Nat	Player	Total		Pro League		Belgian Cup		UEFA Europa Conference League	
No.	Pos	Nat	Player	Apps	Goals	Apps	Goals	Apps	Goals	Apps	Goals
Goalkeepers
16	GK	(Netherlands) NED	Bart Verbruggen	24	0	17	0	1	0	6	0
26	GK	(Belgium) BEL	Colin Coosemans	0	0	0	0	0	0	0	0
30	GK	(Belgium) BEL	Hendrik Van Crombrugge	28	0	17	0	1	0	10	0
Defenders
3	DF	(Belgium) BEL	Hannes Delcroix	25	1	13+3	0	2	0	7	1
5	DF	(Senegal) SEN	Moussa N'Diaye	25	0	10+5	0	1+1	0	7+1	0
14	DF	(Belgium) BEL	Jan Vertonghen	36	2	23+1	1	1	0	10+1	1
27	DF	(Belgium) BEL	Noah Sadiki	18	0	4+8	0	0+1	0	1+4	0
47	DF	(Belgium) BEL	Lucas Lissens	2	0	0+1	0	0+1	0	0	0
54	DF	(Belgium) BEL	Killian Sardella	22	0	12+4	0	0	0	3+3	0
55	DF	(Belgium) BEL	Marco Kana	16	0	4+5	0	0	0	2+5	0
56	DF	(Belgium) BEL	Zeno Debast	49	0	34	0	2	0	13	0
62	DF	(Panama) PAN	Michael Amir Murillo	45	6	27+2	3	2	0	14	3
Midfielders
7	MF	(Belgium) BEL	Francis Amuzu	50	3	27+6	3	2	0	15	0
10	MF	(Belgium) BEL	Yari Verschaeren	42	4	26+2	2	1	0	11+2	2
11	MF	(Israel) ISR	Lior Refaelov	45	6	17+12	4	1+1	0	10+4	2
18	MF	(Ghana) GHA	Majeed Ashimeru	42	3	21+7	2	1+1	0	7+5	1
21	MF	(Guinea) GUI	Amadou Diawara	35	1	19+3	1	0+2	0	10+1	0
24	MF	(Nigeria) NGR	Ishaq Abdulrazak	6	0	2+1	0	0	0	0+3	0
25	MF	(France) FRA	Adrien Trebel	16	0	6+5	0	2	0	2+1	0
36	MF	(Denmark) DEN	Anders Dreyer	20	5	13+1	4	0	0	6	1
61	MF	(Norway) NOR	Kristian Arnstad	43	1	12+15	1	1	0	10+5	0
71	MF	(Belgium) BEL	Théo Leoni	7	0	1+5	0	0+1	0	0	0
Forwards
9	FW	(Belgium) BEL	Benito Raman	33	6	13+8	5	0+1	0	3+8	1
13	FW	(Algeria) ALG	Islam Slimani	16	9	7+3	8	0	0	4+2	1
29	FW	(Belgium) BEL	Mario Stroeykens	41	4	11+15	4	1+1	0	3+10	0
32	FW	(Ecuador) ECU	Nilson Angulo	11	0	0+6	0	0+1	0	0+4	0
76	FW	(Belgium) BEL	Lucas Stassin	5	0	2+1	0	0	0	0+2	0
Players transferred out during the season
4	DF	(Netherlands) NED	Wesley Hoedt	25	0	15	0	0	0	8+2	0
20	DF	(Sweden) SWE	Kristoffer Olsson	6	0	0+3	0	0	0	1+2	0
46	MF	(Belgium) BEL	Anouar Ait El Hadj	13	0	0+9	0	1+1	0	2	0
59	FW	(Belgium) BEL	Julien Duranville	10	1	2+4	1	0	0	0+4	0
70	FW	(Italy) ITA	Sebastiano Esposito	21	2	5+9	1	0	0	2+5	1
99	FW	(Portugal) POR	Fábio Silva	32	11	17+3	7	2	1	9+1	3

Last updated: 23 April 2023
Source: Competitions
