= 2021–22 RFC Seraing (1922) season =

R.F.C. Seraing
2021–22 season
- Chairman: Mario Franchi
- Manager: Jean-Louis Garcia
- Stadium: Stade du Pairay
- Belgian First Division A: 17th (play-off winners)
- Belgian Cup: Seventh round
Home colours	Away colours

The 2021–22 season will be the 100th season in the existence of R.F.C. Seraing (1922) and the club's first season back in the top flight of Belgian football. In addition to the domestic league, R.F.C. Seraing (1922) will participate in this season's edition of the Belgian Cup.

== Players ==
=== First-team squad ===
As of 31 January 2022

Note: Flags indicate national team as defined under FIFA eligibility rules; some limited exceptions apply. Players may hold more than one non-FIFA nationality.

No.	Pos.	Nation	Player
1	GK	BEL	Timothy Galjé
4	DF	SEN	Wagane Faye
5	MF	CIV	Rayan Djedje (on loan from Metz)
8	DF	FRA	Gerald Kilota
9	FW	GEO	Georges Mikautadze (on loan from Metz)
10	FW	CHA	Marius Mouandilmadji
11	FW	CIV	Ali Sanogo
12	MF	BEL	Antoine Bernier
13	DF	CIV	Kouadio-Yves Dabila (on loan from Lille)
15	MF	BEL	Sami Lahssaini (on loan from Metz)
17	MF	BEL	Mathieu Cachbach (on loan from Metz)
18	DF	CGO	Morgan Poaty
20	DF	FRA	Yahya Nadrani
21	DF	BEL	Fabrice Sambu
22	GK	BEL	Maxime Mignon

No.	Pos.	Nation	Player
23	GK	BEL	Álex Craninx (on loan from Molde)
24	DF	FRA	Benjamin Boulenger
28	DF	BEL	Elias Spago
29	MF	MAR	Bassim Boukteb
30	GK	FRA	Guillaume Dietsch (on loan from Metz)
36	MF	GAM	Ablie Jallow (on loan from Metz)
37	DF	BEL	François D'Onofrio
40	DF	GHA	Daniel Opare
44	MF	GUI	Ibrahima Cissé
51	DF	BEL	Robin Denuit
52	FW	BEL	Noah Serwy
57	MF	FRA	Maïdine Douane (on loan from Metz)
61	FW	ALG	Zakaria Silini
65	FW	BEL	Giacomo D'Asaro
88	MF	FRA	Youssef Maziz (on loan from Metz)

== Pre-season and friendlies ==
Win Draw Loss Fixtures

30 June 2021 Friendly	Eupen (Belgium)	2–1	(Belgium) RFC Seraing	Eupen, Belgium
16:00 CEST (UTC+2)				Stadium: Kehrwegstadion

17 July 2021 Friendly	Metz (France)	1–1	(Belgium) RFC Seraing	France
--:-- CEST (UTC+2)

== Competitions ==
=== Overall record ===
Competition	First match	Last match	Starting round	Final position	Record							
Competition	First match	Last match	Starting round	Final position	Pld	W	D	L	GF	GA	GD	Win %
Belgian First Division A	24 July 2021	10 April 2022	Matchday 1	17th	34	8	4	22	30	68	−38	23.53
Belgian First Division A relegation play-off	23 April 2022	30 April 2022	First leg	Winners	2	1	1	0	1	0	+1	50.00
Belgian Cup	15 September 2021	30 November 2021	Fifth round	Seventh round	3	2	1	0	9	5	+4	66.67
Total					39	11	6	22	40	73	−33	28.21

Source: Soccerway

=== Belgian First Division A ===
==== League table ====
Pos	Team	Pld	W	D	L	GF	GA	GD	Pts	Qualification or relegation
14	Standard Liège	34	9	9	16	32	51	−19	36	
15	Eupen	34	8	8	18	37	61	−24	32	
16	Zulte Waregem	34	8	8	18	42	69	−27	32	
17	Seraing (O)	34	8	4	22	30	68	−38	28	Qualification for the Relegation play-off
18	Beerschot (R)	34	4	4	26	33	76	−43	16	Relegation to First Division B

Source: Jupiler Pro League (in Dutch), Soccerway
Rules for classification: 1) Points; 2) Matches won; 3) Goal difference; 4) Goals scored; 5) Away matches won; 6) Away goal difference; 7) Away goals scored; 8) Play-off.
(O) Play-off winners; (R) Relegated

==== Results summary ====
Overall								Home						Away					
Pld	W	D	L	GF	GA	GD	Pts	W	D	L	GF	GA	GD	W	D	L	GF	GA	GD
34	8	4	22	30	68	−38	28	5	3	9	16	30	−14	3	1	13	14	38	−24

Source: Jupiler Pro League

==== Results by round ====
Round	1	2	3	4	5	6	7	8	9	10	11	12	13	14	15	16	17	18	19	20	21	22	23	24	25	26	27	28	29	30	31	32	33	34
Ground	A	H	A	H	H	A	H	A	A	H	A	H	A	H	A	H	A	H	A	H	A	H	A	H	H	A	H	A	A	H	A	H	A	H
Result	L	W	L	L	W	W	L	L	L	W	L	L	L	D	W	W	L	L	L	L	L	L	L	W	D	L	L	L	L	L	W	D	D	L
Position	17	9	15	16	11	9	10	13	14	13	14	16	16	16	15	14	15	15	16	17	17	17	17	17	17	17	17	17	17	17	17	17	17	17

Source: Jupiler Pro League
A = Away; H = Home; W = Win; D = Draw; L = Loss

==== Matches ====
The league fixtures were announced on 8 June 2021.

24 July 2021 1	Kortrijk	2–0	Seraing	Kortrijk
18:30 CEST (UTC+2)	Derijck (yellow card) 28'; Chevalier 31'; Vandendriessche (yellow card) 44'; Rougeaux (yellow card) 51'; Selemani 88' (pen.); Palaversa (yellow card) 90+4'	Report	Marius (yellow card) 54'; Nadrani (yellow card) 86'	Stadium: Guldensporen Stadion; Attendance: 2,744; Referee: Christof Dierick

31 July 2021 2	Seraing	1–0	Mechelen	Seraing
18:30 CEST (UTC+2)	Mouandilmadji 14'	Report		Stadium: Stade du Pairay; Attendance: 1,684; Referee: Wesli De Cremer

21 August 2021 5	Seraing	2–1	Cercle Brugge	Seraing
16:15 CEST (UTC+2)	Maziz 54'; Mouandilmadji 79'	Report	Popović 5'	Stadium: Stade du Pairay; Attendance: 1,200; Referee: Christof Dierick

26 September 2021 9	Genk	3–0	Seraing	Genk
21:00 CEST (UTC+2)				Stadium: Luminus Arena

4 December 2021 17	Club Brugge	3–2	Seraing	Bruges
20:45 CET (UTC+1)				Stadium: Jan Breydel Stadium; Referee: Alexandre Boucaut

14 December 2021 19	Cercle Brugge	2–0	Seraing	Bruges
18:45 CET (UTC+1)				Stadium: Jan Breydel Stadium

27 December 2021 21	Mechelen	2–0	Seraing	Mechelen
18:45 CET (UTC+1)				Stadium: Achter de Kazerne; Referee: Jasper Vergoote

5 March 2022 30	Seraing	0–5	Club Brugge	Seraing
20:45 CET (UTC+1)		Report	Skov Olsen 3', 83'; Rits 29'; Dyrestam 45' (o.g.); Dost 73'	Stadium: Stade du Pairay; Attendance: 2,400; Referee: Bram Van Driessche

19 March 2022 32	Seraing	1–1	OH Leuven	Seraing
18:30 CEST (UTC+2)				Stadium: Stade du Pairay

10 April 2022 34	Seraing	0–2	Genk	Seraing
18:30 CEST (UTC+2)				Stadium: Stade du Pairay

==== Relegation play-off ====
23 April 2022 First leg	RWDM	0–1	Seraing	Molenbeek-Saint-Jean
18:30 CEST (UTC+2)			Mikautadze 45'	Stadium: Edmond Machtens Stadium

30 April 2022 Second leg	Seraing	0–0 (1–0 agg.)	RWDM	Seraing
20:45 CEST (UTC+2)				Stadium: Stade du Pairay

=== Belgian Cup ===
27 October 2021 Sixth round	Seraing	3–2 (a.e.t.)	Sint-Truiden	Seraing
20:00 CET (UTC+1)	Mouandilmadji 35'; Maziz 80', 104'		Matsubara 53'; Koita 57'	Stadium: Stade du Pairay

30 November 2021 Seventh round	Seraing	3–3 (a.e.t.) (3–4 p)	Anderlecht	Seraing
20:45 CET (UTC+1)	Maziz 10' (pen.), 60'; Mikautadze 17' (pen.)	Report	Kouamé 39', 41'; Refaelov 50' (pen.)	Stadium: Stade du Pairay; Referee: Bert Put
	Penalties
	Del Fabro (penalty missed); Nadrani (penalty missed); Sanogo (penalty scored); Mikautadze (penalty scored); Maziz (penalty scored)		Gómez (penalty missed); Amuzu (penalty scored); Cullen (penalty scored); Verschaeren (penalty scored); Murillo (penalty scored)
