= 2021–22 RSC Anderlecht season =

Anderlecht
2021–22 season
- Chairman: Wouter Vandenhaute
- Head coach: Vincent Kompany
- Stadium: Constant Vanden Stock Stadium
- First Division A: 3rd
- Belgian Cup: Runners-up
- UEFA Europa Conference League: Play-off round
- Top goalscorer: League: Joshua Zirkzee (16); All: Lior Refaelov (19)
colours	Away colours	Third colours

The 2021–22 season was the 114th season in the existence of R.S.C. Anderlecht and the club's 86th consecutive season in the top flight of Belgian football. In addition to the domestic league, Anderlecht participated in this season's edition of the Belgian Cup and the UEFA Europa Conference League.

== Players ==
=== First-team squad ===
Note: Flags indicate national team as defined under FIFA eligibility rules; some limited exceptions apply. Players may hold more than one non-FIFA nationality.

No.	Pos.	Nation	Player
2	DF	ARG	Lisandro Magallán (on loan from Ajax)
3	DF	BEL	Hannes Delcroix
4	DF	NED	Wesley Hoedt
7	MF	BEL	Francis Amuzu
8	MF	IRL	Josh Cullen
9	FW	BEL	Benito Raman
10	MF	BEL	Yari Verschaeren
11	MF	ISR	Lior Refaelov
14	DF	UKR	Bohdan Mykhaylichenko
16	GK	NED	Bart Verbruggen
17	MF	ESP	Sergio Gómez
18	MF	GHA	Majeed Ashimeru
20	MF	SWE	Kristoffer Olsson
23	FW	NED	Joshua Zirkzee (on loan from Bayern Munich)

No.	Pos.	Nation	Player
26	GK	BEL	Colin Coosemans
30	GK	BEL	Hendrik Van Crombrugge (captain)
46	MF	BEL	Anouar Ait El Hadj
47	DF	BEL	Lucas Lissens
52	MF	BEL	Mario Stroeykens
53	FW	BEL	Antoine Colassin
54	DF	BEL	Killian Sardella
55	DF	BEL	Marco Kana
56	DF	BEL	Zeno Debast
61	MF	NOR	Kristian Arnstad
62	DF	PAN	Michael Amir Murillo
70	GK	BEL	Rik Vercauteren
99	FW	CIV	Christian Kouamé (on loan from Fiorentina)

=== Other players under contract ===
Note: Flags indicate national team as defined under FIFA eligibility rules; some limited exceptions apply. Players may hold more than one non-FIFA nationality.

No.	Pos.	Nation	Player
—	FW	BEL	Zakaria Bakkali

=== Out on loan ===
Note: Flags indicate national team as defined under FIFA eligibility rules; some limited exceptions apply. Players may hold more than one non-FIFA nationality.

No.	Pos.	Nation	Player
—	GK	GER	Timon Wellenreuther (to Willem II)
—	DF	BEL	Elias Cobbaut (to Parma)
—	MF	NED	Michel Vlap (to Twente)
—	MF	USA	Kenny Saief (to Ashdod)

No.	Pos.	Nation	Player
—	MF	BEL	Aristote Nkaka (to Waasland-Beveren)
—	MF	FRA	Adrien Trebel (to Lausanne-Sport)
—	FW	SLE	Mustapha Bundu (to Aarhus)
—	FW	GHA	Mo Dauda (to Cartagena)

== Transfers ==
=== In ===
Pos	Player	Transferred from	Fee	Date	Source
DF	Sergio Gomez (ESP)	Borussia Dortmund (GER)	Undisclosed	1 July 2021	
DF	Taylor Harwood-Bellis (ENG)	Manchester City (ENG)	Loan	1 July 2021	
FW	Benito Raman (BEL)	Schalke 04 (GER)	Undisclosed	15 July 2021	
MF	Kristoffer Olsson (SWE)	Krasnodar (RUS)	Undisclosed	21 July 2021	
FW	Joshua Zirkzee (NED)	Bayern Munich (GER)	Loan	4 August 2021	
FW	Christian Kouamé (CIV)	Fiorentina (ITA)	Loan	21 August 2021	
DF	Lisandro Magallán (ARG)	Ajax (NED)	Loan	31 August 2021	

=== Out ===
Pos	Player	Transferred to	Fee	Date	Source
MF	Albert Sambi Lokonga (BEL)	Arsenal (ENG)	€19.9m	19 July 2021	

== Pre-season and friendlies ==
Win Draw Loss Fixtures

25 June 2021 Friendly	Anderlecht (Belgium)	1–1	(Belgium) Sint-Truiden	Brussels, Belgium
12:00 CEST (UTC+2)				Stadium: RSCA Football Academy

2 July 2021 Friendly	Anderlecht (Belgium)	Cancelled	(Belgium) Oostende	Neerpede, Belgium
12:00 CEST (UTC+2)

16 July 2021 Friendly	Anderlecht (Belgium)	1–1	(Greece) OFI	Brussels, Belgium
12:00 CEST (UTC+2)	Dauda 63'		Korovesis 80'	Stadium: Constant Vanden Stock Stadium

16 July 2021 Friendly	Anderlecht (Belgium)	0–2	(Netherlands) Ajax	Brussels, Belgium
19:30 CEST (UTC+2)			Haller 7', 55'; Magallán (yellow card) 90+2'	Stadium: Constant Vanden Stock Stadium; Attendance: 6,000; Referee: Simon Bourdeaud’hui

7 October 2021 Friendly	Anderlecht (Belgium)	4–1	(Belgium) Westerlo	Brussels, Belgium
12:00 CEST (UTC+2)				Stadium: RSCA Football Academy

9 January 2022 Friendly	Anderlecht (Belgium)	2–0	(Belgium) Westerlo	Brussels, Belgium
11:30 CET (UTC+1)				Stadium: Complexe Sportif Neerpede

9 January 2022 Friendly	Anderlecht (Belgium)	3–0	(Belgium) Zulte Waregem	Brussels, Belgium
13:30 CET (UTC+1)				Stadium: Complexe Sportif Neerpede

== Competitions ==
=== Overall record ===
Competition	First match	Last match	Starting round	Final position	Record							
Competition	First match	Last match	Starting round	Final position	Pld	W	D	L	GF	GA	GD	Win %
First Division A	25 July 2021	22 May 2022	Matchday 1	3rd	40	20	12	8	80	43	+37	50.00
Belgian Cup	27 October 2021	18 April 2022	Sixth round	Runners-up	6	3	3	0	18	7	+11	50.00
UEFA Europa Conference League	5 August 2021	26 August 2021	Third qualifying round	Play-off round	4	2	1	1	9	6	+3	50.00
Total					50	25	16	9	107	56	+51	50.00

Source: Soccerway

=== First Division A ===
==== League table ====
Pos	Team	Pld	W	D	L	GF	GA	GD	Pts	Qualification or relegation
1	Union SG	34	24	5	5	78	27	+51	77	Qualification for the Europa Conference League and Play-offs I (Note: The regular season winners will qualify for the 2022–23 UEFA Europa Conference League if they do not qualify for the 2022–23 UEFA Champions League in the playoffs.)
2	Club Brugge (C)	34	21	9	4	72	37	+35	72	Qualification for the Play-offs I
3	Anderlecht	34	18	10	6	72	36	+36	64	Qualification for the Play-offs I
4	Antwerp	34	19	6	9	55	38	+17	63	Qualification for the Play-offs I
5	Gent	34	18	8	8	56	30	+26	62	Qualification for the Play-offs II

Source: Jupiler Pro League (in Dutch), Soccerway
Rules for classification: 1) Points; 2) Matches won; 3) Goal difference; 4) Goals scored; 5) Away matches won; 6) Away goal difference; 7) Away goals scored; 8) Play-off.
(C) Champions

==== Results summary ====
Overall								Home						Away					
Pld	W	D	L	GF	GA	GD	Pts	W	D	L	GF	GA	GD	W	D	L	GF	GA	GD
34	18	10	6	72	36	+36	64	10	5	2	41	19	+22	8	5	4	31	17	+14

Source: Jupiler Pro League

==== Results by round ====
Round	1	2	3	4	5	6	7	8	9	10	11	12	13	14	15	16	17	18	19	20	21	22	23	24	25	26	27	28	29	30	31	32	33	34
Ground	H	A	H	A	H	A	H	A	A	H	A	H	H	A	H	A	H	A	H	A	A	H	A	H	A	H	A	H	A	H	H	A	H	A
Result	L	D	W	W	D	L	W	W	D	D	D	W	D	L	D	W	W	W	W	D	W	D	W	L	L	W	W	W	D	W	W	L	W	W
Position	16	17	8	7	7	12	5	3	6	6	6	4	6	6	6	6	5	5	4	4	4	4	4	4	4	4	4	4	4	4	4	4	4	4

Source: Jupiler Pro League
A = Away; H = Home; W = Win; D = Draw; L = Loss

==== Matches ====
The league fixtures were announced on 8 June 2021.

25 July 2021 1	Anderlecht	1–3	Union Saint-Gilloise	Anderlecht
18:30 CEST (UTC+2)	Verschaeren 45+2'; Hoedt (yellow card) 66'; Murillo (yellow card) 90+4'; Amuzu (yellow card) 90+5'	Report	Undav 20', 62'; François (yellow card) 50'; Lapoussin (yellow card) 52'; Lazare 73'; Avenatti (yellow card) 80'	Stadium: Constant Vanden Stock Stadium; Attendance: 6,000; Referee: Kevin Van Damme

31 July 2021 2	Eupen	1–1	Anderlecht	Eupen
20:45 CEST (UTC+2)	Agbadou (yellow card) 29'; Cools 45+1'	Report	Raman 39'; Murillo (yellow card) 61'	Stadium: Stadion am Kehrweg; Attendance: 1,450; Referee: Jonathan Lardot

8 August 2021 3	Anderlecht	3–0	Seraing	Anderlecht
18:30 CEST (UTC+2)	Raman (yellow card) 58'; Kiese Thelin 69'; Sergio Gómez 82'; Amuzu 90+1' (yellow card) 90+3'	Report	Boulenger (yellow card) 31' (yellow-red card) 39'	Stadium: Constant Vanden Stock Stadium; Attendance: 8,000; Referee: Wim Smet

15 August 2021 4	Cercle Brugge	1–2	Anderlecht	Bruges
18:30 CEST (UTC+2)	Deman 1'; Utkas (yellow card) 19'; Waldo Rubio (yellow card) 90+3'	Report	Zirkzee 13' 29'	Stadium: Jan Breydel Stadium; Attendance: 3,000; Referee: Jasper Vergoote

29 August 2021 6	Genk	1–0	Anderlecht	Genk
18:30 CEST (UTC+2)	Muñoz (yellow card) 66'; Ugbo 87'	Report	Raman (yellow card) 42'; Harwood-Bellis (yellow card) 66'; Olsson (yellow card) 68'; Amuzu (yellow card) 84'; Sergio Gómez (yellow card) 90'	Stadium: Cegeka Arena; Attendance: 17,000; Referee: Nicolas Laforge

12 September 2021 7	Anderlecht	7–2	Mechelen	Anderlecht
13:30 CEST (UTC+2)	Raman 23'; Kouamé 49' 57'; Olsson (yellow card) 60'; Murillo 61'; Amuzu 74'; Verschaeren 85'; Zirkzee 87'	Report	Storm 36'; Kaya 90+1'	Stadium: Constant Vanden Stock Stadium; Attendance: 19,500; Referee: Jonathan Lardot

19 September 2021 8	Standard Liège	0–1	Anderlecht	Liège
18:30 CEST (UTC+2)	Al-Dakhil (red card) 7'; Klauss (yellow card) 37'; Nkounkou (yellow card) 67'; Amallah (yellow card) 84'; Fai (red card) 84'	Report	Sergio Gómez (yellow card) 9'; Refaelov 12'; Harwood-Bellis (yellow card) 24'; Ashimeru (yellow card) 90'; Zirkzee (yellow card) 90'	Stadium: Stade Maurice Dufrasne; Attendance: 24,000; Referee: Nicolas Laforge

23 September 2021 5	Anderlecht	1–1	Gent	Anderlecht
20:45 CEST (UTC+2)	Murillo (yellow card) 28'; Refaelov 59' (pen.); Cullen (yellow card) 72'	Report	Owusu (yellow card) 31'; Castro-Montes 39'; Godeau (yellow card) 55'	Stadium: Constant Vanden Stock Stadium; Attendance: 19,000; Referee: Erik Lambrechts

26 September 2021 9	Oostende	2–2	Anderlecht	Oostende
18:30 CEST (UTC+2)	Gueye 7' 29'; Ndicka (yellow card) 36'; Tanghe (yellow card) 90+2'	Report	Amuzu (yellow card) 35'; Kouamé (red card) 47'; Zirkzee 64'; Raman 82'	Stadium: Diaz Arena; Attendance: 5,008; Referee: Lothar D'hondt

3 October 2021 10	Anderlecht	1–1	Club Brugge	Anderlecht
13:30 CEST (UTC+2)	Refaelov (yellow card) 51'; Hoedt (yellow card) 70'; Raman 75'	Report	Rits 15'; Sobol (yellow card) 44'; Lang (yellow card) 70'; Balanta (yellow card) 79'; De Ketelaere (yellow card) 90+1'	Stadium: Constant Vanden Stock Stadium; Attendance: 19,500; Referee: Lawrence Visser

17 October 2021 11	Sint-Truiden	2–2	Anderlecht	Sint-Truiden
CEST (UTC+2)		Report		Stadium: Stayen; Attendance: 6,500; Referee: Alexandre Boucaut

24 October 2021 12	Anderlecht	4–2	Beerschot	Anderlecht
CEST (UTC+2)		Report		Stadium: Constant Vanden Stock Stadium; Attendance: 20,000; Referee: Christof Dierick

31 October 2021 13	Anderlecht	2–2	OH Leuven	Anderlecht
CET (UTC+1)		Report		Stadium: Constant Vanden Stock Stadium; Attendance: 19,000; Referee: Jasper Vergoote

7 November 2021 14	Antwerp	2–0	Anderlecht	Antwerp
18:30 CET (UTC+1)	Yusuf 63'; Frey (penalty missed) 82', 82'	Report	Cullen (yellow card) 31'; Hoedt (yellow card) 81'; Harwood-Bellis (yellow card) 82'	Stadium: Bosuilstadion; Attendance: 15,000; Referee: Jonathan Lardot

21 November 2021 15	Anderlecht	1–1	Kortrijk	Anderlecht
CET (UTC+1)		Report		Stadium: Constant Vanden Stock Stadium; Attendance: 18,000; Referee: Wim Smet

27 November 2021 16	Charleroi	1–3	Anderlecht	Bruges
CET (UTC+1)		Report		Stadium: Jan Breydel Stadium; Attendance: 10,816; Referee: Erik Lambrechts

5 December 2021 17	Anderlecht	3–2	Zulte Waregem	Anderlecht
CET (UTC+1)		Report		Stadium: Constant Vanden Stock Stadium; Attendance: 18,000; Referee: Lawrence Visser

11 December 2021 18	Seraing	0–5	Anderlecht	Bruges
CET (UTC+1)		Report		Stadium: Jan Breydel Stadium; Attendance: 2,600; Referee: Jan Boterberg

14 December 2021 19	Anderlecht	2–0	Sint-Truiden	Anderlecht
CET (UTC+1)		Report		Stadium: Constant Vanden Stock Stadium; Attendance: 13,500; Referee: Jonathan Lardot

19 December 2021 20	Club Brugge	2–2	Anderlecht	Bruges
13:30 CET (UTC+1)	De Ketelaere 9'; Vanaken 85'	Report	Amuzu 73'; Hoedt 80'	Stadium: Jan Breydel Stadium; Attendance: 28,000; Referee: Nathan Verboomen

27 December 2021 21	Beerschot	0–7	Anderlecht	Antwerp
CET (UTC+1)		Report		Stadium: Olympic Stadium; Attendance: 0 Referee: Wim Smet

16 January 2022 22	Anderlecht	1–1	Standard Liège	Anderlecht
18:30 CET (UTC+1)	Verschaeren 32'	Report	Drăguș 86'	Stadium: Constant Vanden Stock Stadium; Attendance: 0 Referee: Bram Van Driessche

23 January 2022 23	Mechelen	0–1	Anderlecht	Mechelen
18:30 CET (UTC+1)		Report	Zirkzee 23'	Stadium: Achter de Kazerne; Attendance: 0 Referee: Jan Boterberg

26 January 2022 24	Anderlecht	0–2	Cercle Brugge	Anderlecht
21:00 CET (UTC+1)		Report	Matondo 68'; Kanouté 87'	Stadium: Constant Vanden Stock Stadium; Attendance: 0 Referee: Wesli De Cremer

29 January 2022 25	Union Saint-Gilloise	1–0	Anderlecht	Brussels
13:30 CET (UTC+1)	Nielsen 11'	Report		Stadium: Stade Joseph Marien; Attendance: 6,491; Referee: Erik Lambrechts

6 February 2022 26	Anderlecht	4–1	Eupen	Anderlecht
18:30 CET (UTC+1)		Report		Stadium: Constant Vanden Stock Stadium; Attendance: 12,000; Referee: Nathan Verboomen

12 February 2022 27	Zulte Waregem	1–2	Anderlecht	Bruges
20:45 CET (UTC+1)	Gano 74'	Report	Kouamé 18'; Refaelov 33'	Stadium: Jan Breydel Stadium; Attendance: 7,445; Referee: Jan Boterberg

20 February 2022 28	Anderlecht	2–0	Genk	Anderlecht
18:30 CET (UTC+1)	Ashimeru 36'; Verschaeren 41'	Report		Stadium: Constant Vanden Stock Stadium; Attendance: 17,000; Referee: Bram Van Driessche

26 February 2022 29	OH Leuven	0–0	Anderlecht	Bruges
20:45 CET (UTC+1)		Report		Stadium: Jan Breydel Stadium; Attendance: 7,801; Referee: Erik Lambrechts

6 March 2022 30	Anderlecht	3–0	Oostende	Anderlecht
16:00 CET (UTC+1)	Refaelov 50'; Verschaeren 78'; Raman 82'	Report		Stadium: Constant Vanden Stock Stadium; Attendance: 9,000; Referee: Wesli De Cremer

13 March 2022 31	Anderlecht	2–1	Antwerp	Anderlecht
13:30 CET (UTC+1)	Zirkzee 24'; Gómez (yellow card) 34'; Refaelov 59' (pen.); Sardella (yellow card) 75'; Kouamé (yellow card) 90+5'	Report	Nainggolan (yellow card) 14'; Buta (yellow card) 34'; Yusuf 42', (yellow card) 72'; Vines (yellow card) 44'	Stadium: Constant Vanden Stock Stadium; Attendance: 19,000; Referee: Lawrence Visser

20 March 2022 32	Gent	1–0	Anderlecht	Bruges
18:30 CET (UTC+1)	Tissoudali 81'	Report		Stadium: Jan Breydel Stadium; Attendance: 19,990; Referee: Jonathan Lardot

3 April 2022 33	Anderlecht	4–0	Charleroi	Anderlecht
18:30 CEST (UTC+2)	Kouamé 19'; Zirkzee 61'; Amuzu 79'; Murillo 86'	Report		Stadium: Constant Vanden Stock Stadium; Attendance: 19,000; Referee: Erik Lambrechts

10 April 2022 34	Kortrijk	2–3	Anderlecht	Bruges
18:30 CEST (UTC+2)		Report		Stadium: Jan Breydel Stadium; Attendance: 8,950; Referee: Jan Boterberg

==== Play-Off I ====
Pos	Team	Pld	W	D	L	GF	GA	GD	Pts	Qualification or relegation	CLU	USG	AND	ANT
1	Club Brugge (C)	6	4	2	0	8	2	+6	50	Qualification for the Champions League group stage	—	1–0	1–1	1–0
2	Union SG	6	2	1	3	5	5	0	46	Qualification for the Champions League third qualifying round	0–2	—	3–1	0–1
3	Anderlecht	6	2	2	2	8	7	+1	40	Qualification for the Europa Conference League third qualifying round	0–0	0–2	—	2–1
4	Antwerp	6	1	1	4	3	10	−7	36	Qualification for the Europa Conference League second qualifying round	1–3	0–0	0–4	—

Source: Jupiler Pro League (in Dutch), Soccerway
Legend: Blue = home team win; Yellow = draw; Red = away team win.
Rules for classification: 1) Points; 2) Points without (possible) half points added due to rounding; 3) Regular season finishing position.
(C) Champions

==== Results summary ====
Overall								Home						Away					
Pld	W	D	L	GF	GA	GD	Pts	W	D	L	GF	GA	GD	W	D	L	GF	GA	GD
6	2	2	2	8	7	+1	8	1	1	1	2	3	−1	1	1	1	6	4	+2

Source: Jupiler Pro League

==== Results by round ====
Round	1	2	3	4	5	6
Ground	A	H	A	H	H	A
Result	L	D	W	W	L	D
Position	4	4	3	3	4	3

Source: Jupiler Pro League
A = Away; H = Home; W = Win; D = Draw; L = Loss

==== Matches ====
24 April 2022 1	Union Saint-Gilloise	3–1	Anderlecht	Brussels
18:30 CEST (UTC+2)	Nieuwkoop 2'; Vanzeir 12'; Lazare (yellow card) 47'; Mitoma 52'; Bager (yellow card) 90'	Report	Cullen 26', (yellow card) 31'; Murillo (yellow card) 50'; Olsson (yellow card) 90+6'	Stadium: Stade Joseph Marien; Attendance: 8,700; Referee: Jonathan Lardot

1 May 2022 2	Anderlecht	0–0	Club Brugge	Anderlecht
18:30 CEST (UTC+2)	Magallán (yellow card) 14'; Kouamé (yellow card) 86'	Report	Nsoki (yellow card) 73'; Balanta (yellow card) 86'	Stadium: Constant Vanden Stock Stadium; Attendance: 19,000; Referee: Nathan Verboomen

8 May 2022 3	Antwerp	0–4	Anderlecht	Antwerp
18:30 CEST (UTC+2)	Benson (yellow card) 58'; Gerkens (yellow card) 82'	Report	Arnstad (yellow card) 9'; Amuzu 10', 53', 55'; Kouamé (yellow card) 28'; Zirkzee 48'	Stadium: Bosuilstadion; Attendance: 13,876; Referee: Jonathan Lardot

12 May 2022 4	Anderlecht	2–1	Antwerp	Anderlecht
20:30 CEST (UTC+2)	Gómez 14' (pen.); Amuzu 44'; Mykhaylichenko (yellow card) 66'; Verschaeren (yellow card) 90+2'	Report	Dwomoh (yellow card) 72'; Seck 84'	Stadium: Constant Vanden Stock Stadium; Attendance: 19,000; Referee: Nicolas Laforge

15 May 2022 5	Anderlecht	0–2	Union Saint-Gilloise	Anderlecht
18:30 CEST (UTC+2)		Report	Mitoma 2'; Undav 50'	Stadium: Constant Vanden Stock Stadium; Attendance: 19,000; Referee: Bram van Driessche

22 May 2022 6	Club Brugge	1–1	Anderlecht	Bruges
18:30 CEST (UTC+2)	Skov Olsen 39'	Report	Hendry 87' (o.g.)	Stadium: Jan Breydel Stadium; Attendance: 15,126; Referee: Lothar D'hondt

=== Belgian Cup ===
Anderlecht entered the competition in the sixth round. They were drawn away to RAAL La Louvière in the sixth round and Seraing in the seventh round.

27 October 2021 Sixth round	RAAL La Louvière	1–7	Anderlecht	La Louvière
20:45 CEST (UTC+2)	Franco 34' (pen.); Matoka (yellow card) 38'; Vanhecke (yellow card) 64'; Lazitch (yellow card) 65'; Denayer (yellow card) 74'; Lokando (yellow card) 86'	Report	Magallán (yellow card) 12'; Zirkzee 20', 45'; Hoedt 31', 90'; Murillo (yellow card) 34'; Refaelov 38', 80'; Raman 75'	Stadium: Stade Communal du Tivoli; Referee: Kevin Van Damme

30 November 2021 Seventh round	Seraing	3–3 (a.e.t.) (3–4 p)	Anderlecht	Seraing
20:45 CET (UTC+1)	Maziz 10' (pen.), 60' (yellow card) 79'; Mikautadze 17' (pen.); Lahssaini (yellow card) 90'; Sanogo (yellow card) 118'; Maziz (penalty scored)	Report	Kouamé 39', 41'; Refaelov 50'	Stadium: Stade du Pairay; Referee: Bert Put
	Penalties
	Del Fabro (penalty missed); Nadrani (penalty missed); Sanogo (penalty scored); Mikautadze (penalty scored)		(penalty missed) Gómez; (penalty scored) Amuzu; (penalty scored) Cullen; (penalty scored) Verschaeren; (penalty scored) Murillo

23 December 2021 Quarter-finals	Anderlecht	3–0	Kortrijk	Anderlecht
18:45 CET (UTC+1)	Kouamé 35', 76'; Gómez 43'	Report		Stadium: Constant Vanden Stock Stadium; Referee: Erik Lambrechts

3 February 2022 Semi-finals; First leg	Eupen	2–2	Anderlecht	Eupen
20:45 CET (UTC+1)	Prevljak 16' (pen.); Peeters 78'	Report	Refaelov 6' (pen.), 90+6' (pen.)	Stadium: Kehrwegstadion; Referee: Jonathan Lardot

3 March 2022 Semi-finals; Second leg	Anderlecht	3–1 (5–3 agg.)	Eupen	Anderlecht
20:45 CET (UTC+1)	Murillo 5'; Magallán 28'; Kouamé 47'	Report	Prevljak 10'	Stadium: Constant Vanden Stock Stadium; Attendance: 20,000; Referee: Nicolas Laforge

18 April 2022 Final	Gent	0–0 (a.e.t.) (4–3 p)	Anderlecht	Brussels
15:00 CEST (UTC+2)		Report		Stadium: King Baudouin Stadium; Referee: Lawrence Visser
	Penalties
	De Sart (penalty scored); Hanche-Olsen (penalty scored); Castro-Montes (penalty scored); Lemajić (penalty scored); Ngadeu-Ngadjui (penalty missed)		(penalty scored) Gómez; (penalty scored) Raman; (penalty scored) Castro-Montes; (penalty missed) Kana; (penalty missed) Murillo

=== UEFA Europa Conference League ===
==== Third qualifying round ====
The draw for the third qualifying round was held on 19 July 2021.

5 August 2021 First leg	Laçi (Albania)	0–3	(Belgium) Anderlecht	Elbasan, Albania
19:00 CEST (UTC+2)		Report	Delcroix 27'; Hoedt 42'; Refaelov 61'	Stadium: Elbasan Arena; Attendance: 800; Referee: José María Sánchez (Spain)

12 August 2021 Second leg	Anderlecht (Belgium)	2–1 (5–1 agg.)	(Albania) Laçi	Anderlecht, Belgium
20:00 CEST (UTC+2)	Amuzu 32'; Verschaeren 71'	Report	Lushkja 84'	Stadium: Constant Vanden Stock Stadium; Attendance: 4,256; Referee: Stuart Attwell (England)

==== Play-off round ====
The draw for the play-off round was held on 2 August 2021.

19 August 2021 First leg	Anderlecht (Belgium)	3–3	(Netherlands) Vitesse	Anderlecht, Belgium
20:00 CEST (UTC+2)	Raman 10', 34'; Cullen (yellow card) 43'; Verschaeren 90'; Refaelov (penalty missed) 90+4'; Thelin (yellow card) 90+7'	Report	Bazoer (yellow card) 24'; Dasa 31', (yellow card) 76'; Bero (yellow card) 36'; Frederiksen 46'; Schubert (yellow card) 66'; Tannane 72', (yellow card) 73'; Darfalou (yellow card) 85'; Wittek (yellow card) 88'; Buitink (yellow card) 89'	Stadium: Constant Vanden Stock Stadium; Attendance: 7,877; Referee: Duje Strukan (Croatia)

26 August 2021 Second leg	Vitesse (Netherlands)	2–1 (5–4 agg.)	(Belgium) Anderlecht	Arnhem, Netherlands
19:00 CEST (UTC+2)	Wittek 4', 49'; Bazoer (yellow card) 8'; Schubert (yellow card) 66'; Hajek (yellow card) 71'; Buitink (yellow card) 90+2'	Report	Hoedt (yellow card) 9'; Olsson (yellow card) 29'; Amuzu (yellow card) 66'; Refaelov 80'	Stadium: GelreDome; Attendance: 10,618; Referee: Bartosz Frankowski (Poland)

== Appearances and goals ==
Numbers in parentheses denote appearances as substitute.
Players with names struck through and marked † left the club during the playing season.
Players with names in italics and marked * were on loan from another club for the whole of their season with Anderlecht.
Players listed with no appearances have been in the matchday squad but only as unused substitutes.
Key to positions: GK – Goalkeeper; DF – Defender; MF – Midfielder; FW – Forward

Players contracted for the 2021–22 season
No.	Pos.	Nat.	Name	League		Cup		UECL		Total		Discipline	
No.	Pos.	Nat.	Name	Apps	Goals	Apps	Goals	Apps	Goals	Apps	Goals	A yellow rectangle, denoting the yellow penalty card shown to a player being cautioned	A red rectangle, denoting the red penalty card shown to a player being sent off
1	GK	GER	Timon Wellenreuther	0	0	0	0	0	0	0	0	0	0
2	DF	ARG	Lisandro Magallán *	19 (5)	0	6	1	0	0	25 (5)	1	6	0
3	DF	BEL	Hannes Delcroix	7 (3)	0	0	0	2	1	9 (3)	1	1	0
4	DF	NED	Wesley Hoedt	38	1	6	2	4	1	48	4	10	0
5	DF	UKR	~~Yevhen Makarenko~~ †	0	0	0	0	0	0	0	0	0	0
6	DF	ENG	~~Taylor Harwood-Bellis *~~ †	12 (4)	0	0	0	3	0	15 (4)	0	4	0
7	FW	BEL	Francis Amuzu	13 (24)	9	1 (5)	0	3	1	17 (29)	10	7	0
8	MF	IRL	Josh Cullen	40	1	6	0	4	0	50	1	5	0
9	FW	BEL	Benito Raman	11 (24)	9	0 (5)	1	4	2	15 (29)	12	3	0
10	MF	NED	Michel Vlap	0	0	0	0	0	0	0	0	0	0
11	MF	ISR	Lior Refaelov	29 (8)	12	6	5	3	2	38 (8)	19	2	0
14	MF	UKR	Bohdan Mykhaylichenko	5 (13)	0	1 (3)	0	0 (2)	0	6 (18)	0	3	0
16	GK	NED	Bart Verbruggen	1	0	0	0	0	0	1	0	0	0
17	MF	ESP	Sergio Gómez	39	6	6	1	4	0	49	7	4	0
18	MF	GHA	Majeed Ashimeru	10 (21)	3	2 (4)	0	0 (2)	0	12 (27)	3	5	0
19	FW	SLE	Mustapha Bundu	0 (1)	3	0	0	0 (1)	0	0 (2)	0	0	0
20	MF	SWE	Kristoffer Olsson	0 (1)	3	0	0	0 (1)	0	0 (2)	0	0	0

=== Squad appearances and goals ===
Last updated 30 November 2021

No.	Pos	Nat	Player	Total		Belgian Division		Belgian Cup		UEFA Europa Conference League	
No.	Pos	Nat	Player	Apps	Goals	Apps	Goals	Apps	Goals	Apps	Goals
Goalkeepers
16	GK	(Netherlands) NED	Bart Verbruggen	0	0	0	0	0	0	0	0
26	GK	(Belgium) BEL	Colin Coosemans	0	0	0	0	0	0	0	0
30	GK	(Belgium) BEL	Hendrik Van Crombrugge	22	0	16	0	2	0	4	0
70	GK	(Belgium) BEL	Rik Vercauteren	0	0	0	0	0	0	0	0
Defenders
2	DF	(Argentina) ARG	Lisandro Magallán	6	0	2+2	0	2	0	0	0
3	DF	(Belgium) BEL	Hannes Delcroix	7	1	3	0	2	0	2	1
4	DF	(Netherlands) NED	Wesley Hoedt	22	4	16	1	2	2	4	1
6	DF	(England) ENG	Taylor Harwood-Bellis	17	0	12+2	0	0	0	3	0
14	DF	(Ukraine) UKR	Bohdan Mykhaylichenko	10	0	2+5	0	0+1	0	0+2	0
47	DF	(Belgium) BEL	Lucas Lissens	0	0	0	0	0	0	0	0
54	DF	(Belgium) BEL	Killian Sardella	5	0	2	0	0+1	0	2	0
55	DF	(Belgium) BEL	Marco Kana	2	0	0	0	1	0	0+1	0
56	DF	(Belgium) BEL	Zeno Debast	0	0	0	0	0	0	0	0
62	DF	(Panama) PAN	Michael Amir Murillo	19	1	12+2	1	2	0	2+1	0
Midfielders
7	MF	(Belgium) BEL	Francis Amuzu	21	3	6+10	2	1+1	0	3	1
8	MF	(Republic of Ireland) IRL	Josh Cullen	22	0	16	0	2	0	4	0
11	MF	(Israel) ISR	Lior Refaelov	19	9	10+4	4	2	3	3	2
17	MF	(Spain) ESP	Sergio Gómez	22	5	16	5	2	0	4	0
18	MF	(Ghana) GHA	Majeed Ashimeru	20	0	3+13	0	1+1	0	0+2	0
20	MF	(Sweden) SWE	Kristoffer Olsson	21	1	14+2	1	1	0	4	0
25	MF	(France) FRA	Adrien Trebel	0	0	0	0	0	0	0	0
46	MF	(Belgium) BEL	Anouar Ait El Hadj	16	0	7+5	0	0+2	0	1+1	0
50	MF	(Belgium) BEL	Sieben Dewaele	0	0	0	0	0	0	0	0
51	MF	(Belgium) BEL	Yari Verschaeren	20	4	10+5	2	1	0	1+3	2
52	MF	(Belgium) BEL	Mario Stroeykens	2	0	1	0	0	0	0+1	0
61	MF	(Norway) NOR	Kristian Arnstad	0	0	0	0	0	0	0	0
68	DF	(Belgium) BEL	Nayel Mehssatou	0	0	0	0	0	0	0	0
Forwards
9	FW	(Belgium) BEL	Benito Raman	20	7	9+6	4	0+1	1	4	2
23	FW	(Netherlands) NED	Joshua Zirkzee	19	8	10+4	6	2	2	2+1	0
53	FW	(Belgium) BEL	Antoine Colassin	0	0	0	0	0	0	0	0
99	FW	(Ivory Coast) CIV	Christian Kouamé	11	5	9+1	3	1	2	0	0
Players who have made an appearance this season but have left the club
19	FW	(Sierra Leone) SLE	Mustapha Bundu	2	0	0+1	0	0	0	0+1	0
24	FW	(Sweden) SWE	Isaac Kiese Thelin	8	1	1+4	1	0	0	1+2	0
38	FW	(Ghana) GHA	Dauda Mohammed	1	0	0	0	0	0	0+1	0

=== Goalscorers ===
Rank	Pos.	No.	Player	Pro League	Belgian Cup	Conference League	Total
1	MF	11	(Israel) Lior Refaelov	12	5	2	19
2	FW	23	(Netherlands) Joshua Zirkzee	16	2	0	18
3	FW	99	(Ivory Coast) Christian Kouamé	8	5	0	13
4	FW	9	(Belgium) Benito Raman	9	1	2	11
Total				80	18	9	107
