= 2021–22 Belgian Cup =

Tournament details
- Country: Belgium
- Dates: 25 July 2021 – 18 April 2022

Final positions
- Champions: Gent
- Runners-up: Anderlecht

The 2021–22 Belgian Cup, called the Croky Cup for sponsorship reasons, was the 67th season of Belgium's annual football cup competition. The competition began on 25 July 2021 and ended with the final on 18 April 2022. The winners of the competition qualified for the 2022–23 UEFA Europa League play-off round.

== Competition format ==
The competition consists of one preliminary round, followed by ten proper rounds. All rounds were single-match elimination rounds, with the exception of the semi-finals which are again held over two legs. When tied after 90 minutes in the first three rounds, penalties were taken immediately. From round four, when tied after 90 minutes first an extra time period of 30 minutes was played, then penalties were taken if still necessary.

Teams entered the competition in different rounds, based upon their 2021–22 league affiliation. Teams from the fifth-level Belgian Division 3 or lower began in round 1, with the exception of six teams from the Belgian Provincial Leagues which were randomly drawn to start in the preliminary round. Belgian Division 2 teams entered in round 2, Belgian National Division 1 teams entered in round 3, Belgian First Division B teams in round 5 (except two already in round 3) and finally the Belgian First Division A teams entered in round 6 (except two already in round 5).

Round	Clubs remaining	Clubs involved	Winners from previous round	New entries this round	Leagues entering at this round
Preliminary Round	312	6	none	6	Belgian Provincial Leagues (6 teams)
Round 1	309	220	3	217	Belgian Division 3 (63 teams) and Belgian Provincial Leagues (154 teams)
Round 2	199	158	110	48	Belgian Division 2 (48 teams)
Round 3	120	96	79	17	Belgian National Division 1 (15 teams) and Belgian First Division B (2 teams)
Round 4	72	48	48	none	none
Round 5	48	32	24	8	Belgian First Division B (6 teams) and Belgian First Division A (2 teams)
Round 6	32	32	16	16	Belgian First Division A (16 teams)
Round 7	16	16	16	none	none
Quarter-Finals	8	8	8	none	none
Semi-Finals	4	4	4	none	none
Final	2	2	2	none	none

== Round and draw dates ==
Round	Draw date	Match date
Preliminary Round	28 June 2021	25 July 2021
First Round	28 June 2021	31 July & 1 August 2021
Second Round	28 June 2021	7 & 8 August 2021
Third Round	28 June 2021	14-18 August 2021
Fourth Round	28 June 2021	21-25 August 2021
Fifth Round	28 June 2021	29 August 2021
Sixth Round	TBD	26 - 28 October 2021
Seventh Round	TBD	1 & 2 December 2021
Quarter-finals	TBD	21 - 23 December 2021
Semi-finals	TBD	Leg 1: 1 - 3 February 2022; Leg 2: 1 - 3 March 2022
Final		16 or 17 April 2022

== Preliminary round ==
This round of matches were played on 25 July 2021 and included six teams playing in the Belgian Provincial Leagues.

Tie	Home team (tier)	Score	Away team (tier)
1	Bossière (7)	2 – 2 (5–3 p)	Fernelmont-Hemptinne (6)
2	Tollembeek (8)	0 – 3	Dendermonde (6)
3	Helson Helchteren (6)	2 – 3	Wezel (6)

== First round ==
This round of matches were played on 31 July and 1 August 2021.

Tie	Home team (tier)	Score	Away team (tier)
Group 1
4	Zedelgem (6)	3 – 3 (6–7 p)	Wielsbeke (6)
5	Koksijde-Oostduinkerke (9)	2 – 2 (4–3 p)	Estaimbourg (7)
6	Herseautoise (7)	2 – 2 (4–3 p)	Havinnes (7)
7	Diksmuide (6)	2 – 1	Anzegem (5)
8	Wevelgem City (7)	5 – 1	Obigies (7)
9	Oostkamp (5)	4 – 0	RC Lauwe (6)
10	Tournai (5)	0 – 1	Racing Waregem (6)
11	Eendracht Wervik (6)	2 – 1	Aalter (6)
12	Roeselare Daisel (6)	1 – 1 (1–3 p)	Blankenberge (6)
13	Rumbeke (6)	2 – 1	Sassport Boezinge (6)
14	Adegem (7)	1 – 5	Houthulst (7)
15	Jong Zulte (6)	1 – 1 (3–2 p)	Voorwaarts Zwevezele B (7)
16	Proven (8)	1 – 3	Club Lauwe (6)
17	Torhout (5)	1 – 1 (4–5 p)	Oostnieuwkerke (6)
Group 2
18	Denderhoutem (6)	4 – 0	Eeklo Meetjesland (7)
19	Svelta Melsele (5)	0 – 5	Berlare (6)
20	Vlaamse Ardennen (6)	2 – 2 (3–2 p)	Voorde Appelterre (5)
21	Munkzwalm (6)	0 – 4	HO Kalken (6)
22	Excelsior Mariakerke (6)	2 – 1	Dendermonde (6)
23	Lebbeke (5)	2 – 0	Sint-Martens-Latem (6)
24	Elene-Grotenberge (6)	5 – 0	Haasdonk (7)
25	Hamme (5)	1 – 0	Wambeek Ternat (6)
26	Schelde Serskamp (8)	5 – 0 FF	Avanti Stekene (5)
27	Sint-Niklaas (5)	2 – 1	Eendracht Zele (6)
28	St-Denijs Sport (7)	0 – 6	Lochristi (5)
29	Galmaarden (7)	0 – 2	Jong Lede (5)
30	Olympic Burst (7)	1 – 2	Bambrugge (5)
Group 3
31	RE Bievene (6)	0 – 14	Ostiches (5)
32	Morlanwelz (6)	3 – 1	SG-Tertre-Hautrage (5)
33	Belœil (6)	2 – 1	AFC Evere (6)
34	Montigny (8)	0 – 4	Rapid Symphorinois (5)
35	R.A.E.C. Mons (5)	9 – 1	BX Brussels (6)
36	Genappe (6)	3 – 0	Ixelles (6)
37	Harchies-Bernissart (8)	2 – 0	Nivellois (6)
38	R.A.E.C. Mons B (7)	1 – 0	Stockel (6)
39	Entité Manageoise (5)	0 – 0 (5–6 p)	Hoeilaart (7)
40	Crossing Schaerbeek (5)	1 – 1 (4–2 p)	Union Lasne-Ohain (6)
41	Rhodienne-De-Hoek (5)	3 – 1	Etterbeek (6)
42	RSC Braine (5)	3 – 1	Léopold (6)
43	Pays Blanc Antoinien (6)	0 – 4	Tempo Overijse (5)
44	Binche (5)	8 – 0	Vacresse (7)
Group 4
45	Wolvertem Merchtem (5)	2 – 1	Wemmel (7)
46	Rupelmonde (8)	0 – 4	Rapid Leest (6)
47	Ranst (6)	3 – 1	Willebroek (7)
48	Stade Everois (6)	2 – 2 (10–11 p)	Kontich (6)
49	Excelsior Mariaburg (8)	1 – 3	Herent (6)
50	Standaard Meerbeek (8)	2 – 0	Groot Dilbeek (7)
51	St-Jozef Londerzeel (8)	1 – 6	Eppegem (5)
52	Sint-Job (7)	1 – 1 (7–6 p)	Grimbergen (6)
53	Bertem-Leefdaal (6)	1 – 3	Kosova Schaerbeek (6)
54	Broechem (7)	0 – 0 (4–5 p)	Saint-Josse (6)
55	Bornem (6)	2 – 1	Berchem Sport B (8)
56	FC Schaerbeek (6)	1 – 4	Racing Mechelen (5)
57	Sporting Bruxelles (6)	2 – 0	Kruibeke (7)
58	Hoboken (7)	1 – 0	Schelle Sport (7)

Tie	Home team (tier)	Score	Away team (tier)
Group 5
59	Andennais (6)	1 – 1 (4–3 p)	Gosselies Sports (5)
60	Meux B (6)	0 – 4	Onhaye (5)
61	Jeunesse Tamines (5)	6 – 1	Malonne (6)
62	Glabbeek-Zuurbemde (8)	0 – 1	Sart-Bernard (7)
63	Hoegaarden-Outgaarden (6)	3 – 1	Bossière (7)
64	Stade Bierbeek (6)	2 – 1	Union Namur FLV (5)
65	Nismes (6)	2 – 3	Flavion-Morialme (6)
66	Aische (5)	3 – 2	Arquet (7)
67	Erpion-Lacs de l'Eau d'Heure (6)	1 – 6	Linden (6)
68	Courcelloise (7)	5 – 0	Walcourt (8)
69	Jodoigne (5)	3 – 1	Montignies (6)
70	Crossing Vissenaken (8)	1 – 1 (4–3 p)	Rhisnes (7)
71	FC SNEF (6)	1 – 0	Pont-a-Celles Buzet (5)
Group 6
72	Mormont (5)	6 – 0	St-Louis-St-Leger (7)
73	Freylange (6)	0 – 2	Aywaille (5)
74	Sprimont B (6)	0 – 3	Rochefort (5)
75	Bastogne (6)	1 – 1 (6–5 p)	Meix-Devant-Virton (6)
76	St-Hubert (6)	1 – 6	Habay-la-Neuve (5)
77	Tenneville Sports (7)	1 – 1 (3–5 p)	Vaux-Noville (6)
78	Gouvy (5)	1 – 1 (0–3 p)	Messancy (7)
79	Wanze/Bas-Oha (5)	1 – 2	Chevetogne (6)
80	Oppagne-Wéris (5)	5 – 0 FF	Spa (8)
81	JS Fizoise (6)	0 – 2	Sprimont (5)
82	Huy (5)	6 – 2	Melreux-Hotton (7)
83	Arlon (6)	4 – 1	Bercheux (7)
84	Marloie Sports (5)	4 – 0	La Roche (6)
85	Ster-Francorchamps B (9)	3 – 1	Huccorgne (7)
Group 7
86	Betekom (5)	2 – 0	Punt-Larum (8)
87	Witgoor Sport (5)	5 – 0	St-Jozef Rijkevorsel (8)
88	Esperanza Pelt (5)	3 – 0	Verbroedering Lommel (8)
89	Eksel (6)	3 – 0	Lummen (9)
90	Berg en Dal (6)	2 – 0	Vorselaar (6)
91	Lille (5)	2 – 0	Oud-Turnhout (9)
92	St-Dymphna (7)	1 – 1 (2–3 p)	Zwarte Leeuw (5)
93	Berlaar-Heikant (5)	1 – 0	Herselt (7)
94	Turnhout (5)	3 – 2	Torpedo Hasselt (6)
95	Beringen (5)	1 – 2	Wezel (6)
96	Waanrode (8)	0 – 5	St-Lenaarts (5)
97	Nijlen (6)	12 – 1	Noordstar Noorderwijk (8)
98	Achel (6)	0 – 2	De Kempen (5)
99	Diest (5)	7 – 1	Stal Sport Koersel (7)
Group 8
100	Herstal (5)	3 – 1	Elsautoise (6)
101	FC Tilleur (8)	3 – 1	Vaux-Chaudfontaine (7)
102	Bregel (6)	3 – 1	Stade Disonais (5)
103	Trois-Frontières (7)	5 – 1	Aubel B (7)
104	Rechain (6)	2 – 2 (5–4 p)	Schoonbeek-Beverst (6)
105	Raeren-Eynatten (5)	2 – 0	Hombourg (7)
106	Wellen (5)	5 – 0	Sart-Tilman (8)
107	Rutten (9)	1 – 7	Mechelen a/d Maas (6)
108	Entente Blegnytoise B (9)	0 – 4	Richelle United (5)
109	Espoir Minerois (7)	2 – 1	Kabouters Opglabbeek (7)
110	Henis (7)	1 – 3	Gravelo (7)
111	Aubel (6)	1 – 1 (4–2 p)	Weerstand Koersel (5)
112	SLW Maaseik (8)	0 – 5	Zepperen-Brustem (6)
113	Grimbie 69 (8)	2 – 9	Eendracht Termien (5)

== Second round ==
This round of matches was played on 7 and 8 August 2021 and included the 110 winners from the First Round together with 48 teams playing in the Belgian Division 2.

Tie	Home team (tier)	Score	Away team (tier)
114	Solières (4)	1 – 0	Ster-Francorchamps B (9)
115	Houthulst (7)	3 – 0	Rapid Leest (6)
116	Herseautoise (7)	0 – 5	Richelle United (5)
117	Belisia (4)	4 – 0	Oppagne-Wéris (5)
118	Sint-Niklaas (5)	2 – 2 (3–4 p)	Londerzeel (4)
119	Warnant (4)	1 – 0	Hamme (5)
120	Mechelen a/d Maas (6)	0 – 3	Ganshoren (4)
121	Petegem (4)	8 – 0	Standaard Meerbeek (8)
122	Rechain (6)	1 – 5	Bornem (6)
123	Wolvertem Merchtem (5)	2 – 1	Berchem (4)
124	Durbuy (4)	1 – 2	Jong Lede (5)
125	Ronse (4)	1 – 3	Wezel (6)
126	Gullegem (4)	2 – 0	Eppegem (5)
127	Denderhoutem (6)	2 – 4	Rochefort (5)
128	Dikkelvenne (4)	4 – 0	Sart-Bernard (7)
129	Trois-Frontières (7)	0 – 7	Eendracht Wervik (6)
130	Ranst (6)	0 – 4	Pepingen-Halle (4)
131	Bambrugge (5)	1 – 2	Aische (5)
132	Rebecq (4)	10 – 1	Harchies-Bernissart (8)
133	Bregel (6)	1 – 2	Wellen (5)
134	Meux (4)	1 – 2	Jeunesse Tamines (5)
135	Tempo Overijse (5)	1 – 1 (1–2 p)	RSC Braine (5)
136	Tubize-Braine (4)	3 – 0	Hoboken (7)
137	Mormont (5)	0 – 3	R.A.E.C. Mons (5)
138	RC Gent (4)	2 – 1	Saint-Josse (6)
139	Morlanwelz (6)	0 – 10	RAAL La Louvière (4)
140	Wijgmaal (4)	1 – 1 (4–5 p)	Zwarte Leeuw (5)
141	Bastogne (6)	1 – 3	Witgoor Sport (5)
142	Oostkamp (5)	2 – 2 (4–5 p)	Aalst (4)
143	Stade Bierbeek (6)	2 – 0	Koksijde-Oostduinkerke (9)
144	Blankenberge (6)	0 – 0 (7–8 p)	Rumbeke (6)
145	Betekom (5)	0 – 3	Diegem (4)
146	Lille United (5)	0 – 3	Olsa Brakel (4)
147	Andennais (6)	2 – 2 (2–4 p)	Racing Waregem (6)
148	Westhoek (4)	4 – 1	Excelsior Mariakerke (6)
149	FC SNEF (6)	0 – 4	Bocholt (4)
150	Stockay (4)	2 – 0	Messancy (7)
151	Ostiches (5)	2 – 3	Waremme (4)
152	Elene-Grotenberge (6)	1 – 0	Turnhout (5)
153	Herent (6)	2 – 3	Rapid Symphorinois (5)

Tie	Home team (tier)	Score	Away team (tier)
154	Zepperen-Brustem (6)	1 – 2	Eksel (6)
155	Lyra-Lierse Berlaar (4)	8 – 2	Jong Zulte (6)
156	Chevetogne (6)	1 – 3	City Pirates (4)
157	Binche (5)	0 – 0 (4–2 p)	Jette (4)
158	Raeren-Eynatten (5)	2 – 0	Berlare (6)
159	Hasselt (4)	6 – 0	Belœil (6)
160	Acren-Lessines (4)	2 – 2 (4–2 p)	Sprimont (5)
161	Gravelo (7)	1 – 1 (3–4 p)	Hoegaarden-Outgaarden (6)
162	Arlon (6)	1 – 0	Schelde Serskamp (8)
163	Kosova Schaerbeek (6)	3 – 0	Hoeilaart (7)
164	Herstal (5)	1 – 1 (4–5 p)	Habay-la-Neuve (5)
165	Aubel (6)	0 – 2	Menen (4)
166	Verlaine (4)	3 – 0	Espoir Minerois (7)
167	Nijlen (6)	0 – 3	Berg en Dal (6)
168	Racing Mechelen (5)	6 – 0	Sint-Job (7)
169	Crossing Schaerbeek (5)	0 – 2	Heur-Tongeren (4)
170	Lebbeke (5)	1 – 1 (3–2 p)	Wevelgem City (7)
171	Courcelloise (7)	0 – 2	Merelbeke (4)
172	Ninove (4)	4 – 0	Berlaar-Heikant (5)
173	Diksmuide (6)	2 – 0	Rhodienne-De-Hoek (5)
174	RFC Wetteren (4)	0 – 0 (4–2 p)	Esperanza Pelt (5)
175	Club Lauwe (6)	3 – 2	Genappe (6)
176	Houtvenne (4)	4 – 1	Aywaille (5)
177	Huy (5)	2 – 0	Marloie Sports (5)
178	Hoogstraten (4)	2 – 0	Kontich (6)
179	Oostnieuwkerke (6)	0 – 2	Givry (4)
180	Onhaye (5)	5 – 2	Sporting Bruxelles (6)
181	Harelbeke (4)	3 – 1	Flavion-Morialme (6)
182	R.A.E.C. Mons B (7)	0 – 7	Oudenaarde (4)
183	De Kempen (5)	5 – 0	Vaux-Noville (6)
184	Couvin-Mariembourg (4)	1 – 2	Sint Lenaarts (5)
185	Lochristi (5)	0 – 0 (3–4 p)	Zelzate (4)
186	Diest (5)	0 – 0 (5–4 p)	HO Kalken (6)
187	Vlaamse Ardennen (6)	1 – 2	Eendracht Termien (5)
188	Linden (6)	0 – 2	Cappellen (4)
189	Hades (4)	4 – 2	Wielsbeke (6)
190	Lokeren-Temse (4)	3 – 0	Crossing Vissenaken (8)
191	Jodoigne (5)	1 – 1 (3–1 p)	Hamoir (4)
192	FC Tilleur (8)	2 – 5	Zwevezele (4)

== Third round ==
This round of matches were played from 14 till 18 August 2021 and includes the 79 winners from the Second Round together with 15 teams playing in the Belgian National Division 1 and 2 teams from the Belgian First Division B.

Tie	Home team (tier)	Score	Away team (tier)
193	Racing Mechelen (5)	1 – 1 (6–7 p)	Raeren-Eynatten (5)
194	Jodoigne (5)	3 – 1	RSC Braine (5)
195	Ganshoren (4)	2 – 2 (7–6 p)	Heist (3)
196	Diksmuide (6)	1 – 2	Visé (3)
197	Berg en Dal (6)	0 – 1	Francs Borains (3)
198	Eendracht Termien (5)	1 – 2	Rebecq (4)
199	Sint Lenaarts (5)	0 – 3	RAAL La Louvière (4)
200	Sint-Eloois-Winkel (3)	2 – 0	Elene-Grotenberge (6)
201	Bocholt (4)	0 – 1	Oudenaarde (4)
202	Rumbeke (6)	0 – 3	Richelle United (5)
203	Club Lauwe (6)	2 – 3	Racing Waregem (6)
204	Zelzate (4)	0 – 3	Tienen (3)
205	Ninove (4)	2 – 2 (4–1 p)	Wolvertem Merchtem (5)
206	Hasselt (4)	1 – 3	RC Gent (4)
207	Harelbeke (4)	5 - 0 FF	Zwevezele (4)
208	La Louvière Centre (3)	0 – 0 (7–8 p)	Arlon (6)
209	RFC Wetteren (4)	1 – 0	Menen (4)
210	Rapid Symphorinois (5)	0 – 2	Dender EH (3)
211	Hades (4)	1 – 0	De Kempen (5)
212	City Pirates (4)	1 – 3	Onhaye (5)
213	Hoogstraten (4)	6 – 0	Kosova Schaerbeek (6)
214	Lokeren-Temse (4)	3 – 0	Eksel (6)
215	Gullegem (4)	2 – 0	Stockay (4)
216	Tubize-Braine (4)	2 – 4	Patro Eisden Maasmechelen (3)

Tie	Home team (tier)	Score	Away team (tier)
217	Belisia (4)	2 – 1	Olsa Brakel (4)
218	Londerzeel (4)	1 – 0	Virton (2)
219	Diest (5)	2 – 1	Warnant (4)
220	Dikkelvenne (4)	2 – 0	Houtvenne (4)
221	Cappellen (4)	4 – 1	Bornem (6)
222	Dessel Sport (3)	6 – 0	R.A.E.C. Mons (5)
223	Witgoor Sport (5)	0 – 1	Olympic Charleroi CF (3)
224	Wezel (6)	2 – 1	Huy (5)
225	Jeunesse Tamines (5)	1 – 5	RFC Liège (3)
226	Rupel Boom (3)	2 – 0	Petegem (4)
227	Zwarte Leeuw (5)	3 – 0	Hoegaarden-Outgaarden (6)
228	Knokke (3)	5 – 0	Verlaine (4)
229	Eendracht Wervik (6)	0 – 2	Lebbeke (5)
230	Mandel United (3)	3 – 0	Habay-la-Neuve (5)
231	Thes Sport (3)	2 – 6	Lierse Kempenzonen (2)
232	Givry (4)	0 – 2	Diegem (4)
233	Acren-Lessines (4)	1 – 2	Merelbeke (4)
234	Wellen (5)	5 – 1	Binche (5)
235	Jong Lede (5)	5 – 0 FF	Stade Bierbeek (6)
236	Aische (5)	6 – 3	Solières (4)
237	Aalst (4)	2 – 0	Houthulst (7)
238	Rochefort (5)	2 – 1	Heur-Tongeren (4)
239	Westhoek (4)	2 – 1	Pepingen-Halle (4)
240	Lyra-Lierse Berlaar (4)	3 – 0	Waremme (4)

== Fourth round ==
This round of matches were played from 21 till 25 of August 2021 and includes the 48 winners from the Third Round.

Tie	Home team (tier)	Score	Away team (tier)
241	Jodoigne (5)	3 – 1	Gullegem (4)
242	Knokke (3)	3 – 0	Rochefort (5)
243	Patro Eisden Maasmechelen (3)	0 – 1	Lebbeke (5)
244	Visé (3)	2 – 0	Richelle United (5)
245	Lokeren-Temse (4)	1 – 0	Ninove (4)
246	Oudenaarde (4)	0 – 1	Aalst (4)
247	Hades (4)	1 – 3	Lyra-Lierse Berlaar (4)
248	Lierse Kempenzonen (2)	3 – 0	RFC Wetteren (4)
249	Dender EH (3)	3 – 0	Diest (5)
250	Francs Borains (3)	2 – 0	Londerzeel (4)
251	Sint-Eloois-Winkel (3)	4 – 0	Aische (5)
252	Onhaye (5)	4 – 3	Jong Lede (5)

Tie	Home team (tier)	Score	Away team (tier)
253	Harelbeke (4)	0 – 2 (a.e.t.)	Dikkelvenne (4)
254	Rebecq (4)	1 – 2 (a.e.t.)	RAAL La Louvière (4)
255	RC Gent (4)	4 – 1	Raeren-Eynatten (5)
256	Wellen (5)	1 – 0	Dessel Sport (3)
257	Merelbeke (4)	1 – 2	Zwarte Leeuw (5)
258	Hoogstraten (4)	5 – 1	Arlon (6)
259	Mandel United (3)	2 – 0	Racing Waregem (6)
260	Olympic Charleroi CF (3)	0 – 1	RFC Liège (3)
261	Westhoek (4)	1 – 4	Diegem (4)
262	Belisia (4)	3 – 0	Wezel (6)
263	Tienen (3)	1 – 0	Ganshoren (4)
264	Cappellen (4)	0 – 2	Rupel Boom (3)

== Fifth round ==
This round of matches was scheduled to be played on 29 August 2021 and included the 24 winners from the Fourth Round together with 6 teams from the Belgian First Division B and 2 teams from the Belgian First Division A. In the end, the matches were spread over multiple weeks, with the final fixture almost a month later on 21 September, mainly to accommodate the teams from the professional leagues which had already started their season.

5 September 2021 Match 265	RFC Liège (3)	1–3	Westerlo (2)	Liège
16:00 CEST	Mouchamps 24'		Vaesen 37'; Dierckx 42' (pen.), 90'	Stadium: Stade de Rocourt

14 September 2021 Match 266	Excel Mouscron (2)	3–1	Wellen (5)
20:00 CEST	Ribeiro Costa 19'; Chevalier 23' (pen.); Gueye 49'		Versteeven 62' (pen.)

14 September 2021 Match 267	Lyra-Lierse Berlaar (4)	0–5	Deinze (2)
19:30 CEST			De Belder 17', 26'; Vets 43' (o.g.); Prychynenko 63'; Mertens 80'

29 August 2021 Match 268	Onhaye (5)	1–0 (a.e.t.)	Aalst (4)
16:00 CEST	Lorenzon 96'

29 August 2021 Match 269	Francs Borains (3)	3–1	Hoogstraten (4)
16:00 CEST	Caufriez 39' (pen.), 42'; Habbas 59'		Kuijlaars 79'

4 September 2021 Match 270	Dender EH (3)	1–0	Waasland-Beveren (2)
18:00 CEST	Hens 81'

4 September 2021 Match 271	Lierse Kempenzonen (2)	2–0	Rupel Boom (3)
20:00 CEST	Van Acker 52'; Limbombe 57'

29 August 2021 Match 272	RAAL La Louvière (4)	4–2	Dikkelvenne (4)
16:00 CEST	Soumaré 12'; Romeyns 14'; Djoum 39'; Azevedo-Janelas 68'		Verheuge 51'; Van Peteghem 71'

4 September 2021 Match 273	Visé (3)	0–1	RWDM (2)
19:30 CEST			Libert 81'

29 August 2021 Match 274	Knokke (3)	3–2 (a.e.t.)	RC Gent (4)
16:00 CEST	Vandewalle 7'; Savaete 37'; Koçur 120' (pen.)		Vankerkhoven 5'; Volckaert 90'

29 August 2021 Match 275	Belisia (4)	1–0	Zwarte Leeuw (5)
16:00 CEST	Emens 76'

21 September 2021 Match 276	Union SG (1)	7–0	Lebbeke (5)	Forest, Brussels
20:30 CEST	Mitoma 16'; Burgess 53'; Avenatti 57'; Aeyels 60' (o.g.); Undav 82'; Lazare 84'; Teuma 90' (pen.)			Stadium: Stade Joseph Marien

29 August 2021 Match 277	Tienen (3)	1–0	Jodoigne (5)
16:00 CEST	Mputu 50'

15 September 2021 Match 278	Diegem (4)	2–4	Lommel (2)
20:00 CEST	Egerickx 6'; Deflem 60'		Roque 11'; Kis 36'; Vandersmissen 70'; Saito 78'

29 August 2021 Match 279	Sint-Eloois-Winkel (3)	0–0 (a.e.t.) (5–4 p)	Mandel United (3)
16:00 CEST
	Penalties
	Pupe (penalty missed); B. Kudimbana (penalty scored)		Vanmarcke (penalty missed); De Smul (penalty missed)

15 September 2021 Match 280	Lokeren-Temse (4)	0–3	Seraing (1)
20:00 CEST			Mikautadze 7', 55', 88'

== Sixth round ==
The draw for the sixth round was made on 24 September 2021, a few days after the conclusion of the last match of the previous round. Newly entering at this round were the teams from the Belgian First Division A, with the exception of Union SG and Seraing which had entered in the prior round. The 16 teams entering at this stage were seeded and could not meet each other. The lowest team still in the competition was Onhaye, from the Belgian Division 3 (tier 5).

26 October 2021	KV Oostende (1)	8–1	Onhaye (5)	Oostende
20:00 CEST	Kvasina 5', 26', 41'; Fortès 37'; Atanga 50', 60'; Ambrose 75' (pen.); Ndicka 80'		Delplank 3'	Stadium: Diaz Arena

26 October 2021	RWDM (2)	1–2	Zulte Waregem (1)	Molenbeek-Saint-Jean
20:30 CET	Nangis 40'		Kutesa 1'; Vossen 90+2' (pen.)	Stadium: Edmond Machtens Stadium

26 October 2021	KV Mechelen (1)	2–1	Union SG (1)	Mechelen
20:30 CEST	Shved 16'; Hairemans 65'		Vanzeir 82'	Stadium: AFAS-stadion Achter de Kazerne; Referee: Arthur Denil

26 October 2021	Excel Mouscron (2)	0–1	Standard Liège (1)	Mouscron
20:45 CEST			Klauss 7' (pen.)	Stadium: Stade Le Canonnier; Attendance: 4,000; Referee: Alexandre Boucaut

27 October 2021	Dender EH (3)	0–1	K.A.S.Eupen (1)
20:00 CET			Gnaka 7'

27 October 2021	Sint-Eloois-Winkel (3)	0–6	K.R.C. Genk (1)	Sportpark Terschueren, Sint-Eloois-Winkel
20:00 CEST			Ugbo 34' (pen.), 80'; Arteaga 36', 38'; Paintsil 44'; Toma 87'

27 October 2021	K.A.A. Gent (1)	4–0	Belisia (4)	Ghelamco Arena, Gent
20:00 CEST	Odjidja-Ofoe 6'; Okumu 25'; Mboyo 43'; Chakvetadze 64' (pen.)

27 October 2021	Knokke (3)	1–1 (a.e.t.) (1–2 p)	Kortrijk (1)
20:00 CET	Lambo 79'		Kadri 51'
	Penalties
	Mariën (penalty missed); Binst (penalty missed); Van den Bossche (penalty missed); Vanraefelghem (penalty scored); Bailly (penalty missed)		D'haene (penalty missed); Rougeaux (penalty missed); Palaversa (penalty scored); Sainsbury (penalty scored)

27 October 2021	R.F.C. Seraing (1)	3–2 (a.e.t.)	Sint-Truidense V.V. (1)
20:00 CET	Mouandilmadji 35'; Maziz 80', 104'		Matsubara 53'; Koita 57'

27 October 2021	R. Charleroi S.C. (1)	0–0 (a.e.t.) (3–4 p)	Lommel (2)	Stade du Pays de Charleroi, Charleroi
20:00 CEST
	Penalties
	Morioka (penalty missed); Zaroury (penalty scored); Gholizadeh (penalty scored); Van Cleemput (penalty scored); Gillet (penalty missed)		Roque (penalty scored); Henkens (penalty scored); Vandersmissen (penalty scored); Sales (penalty scored); Þórðarson (penalty missed)

27 October 2021	Francs Borains (3)	0–4	K Beerschot VA (1)
20:30 CET			Noubissi 2'; Caicedo 58'; Holzhauser 80'; Vaca 90'

27 October 2021	Club Brugge (1)	3–0	Deinze (2)	Jan Breydelstadion, Brugge
20:45 CEST	Izquierdo 48'; Dost 74', 77'

27 October 2021	Lierse Kempenzonen (2)	1–2	OH Leuven (1)
20:45 CET	Liongola 80'		Kaba 62' (pen.), 86'

27 October 2021	RAAL La Louvière (4)	1–7	R.S.C. Anderlecht (1)	Stade Communal du Tivoli, La Louvière
20:45 CEST	Franco 35' (pen.)		Zirkzee 20', 45'; Hoedt 32', 90'; Refaelov 39', 79'; Raman 75'

28 October 2021	Cercle Brugge (1)	3–0	K.V.K. Tienen (3)	Jan Breydelstadion, Brugge
20:00 CEST	Denkey 33'; Matondo 42'; Cassaert 63'

28 October 2021	K.V.C. Westerlo (2)	2–1	R.Antwerp F.C. (1)
20:00 CET	Van den Keybus 32'; Foster 44'		Samatta 75'

== Seventh round ==
The draw for the seventh round was made on 28 October 2021, immediately after completion of the last match of round six between Westerlo and Antwerp. Lommel and Westerlo, both playing in the Belgian First Division B (tier 2) are the only teams left not playing at the highest level. Matches will be played mid-week from 30 November 2021 to 2 December 2021.

30 November 2021	R.F.C. Seraing (1)	3–3 (a.e.t.) (3–4 p)	R.S.C. Anderlecht (1)	Seraing
20:45 CET	Maziz 10' (pen.), 60'; Mikautadze 17' (pen.)	Report	Kouamé 39', 41'; Refaelov 50' (pen.)	Stadium: Stade du Pairay; Referee: Bert Put
	Penalties
	Del Fabro (penalty missed); Nadrani (penalty missed); Sanogo (penalty scored); Mikautadze (penalty scored); Maziz (penalty scored)		Gómez (penalty missed); Amuzu (penalty scored); Cullen (penalty scored); Verschaeren (penalty scored); Murillo (penalty scored)

1 December 2021	K.A.S. Eupen (1)	3–2 (a.e.t.)	S.V. Zulte Waregem (1)	Eupen
18:00 CET	Prevljak 72', 82', 95'		Gano 27', 37'	Stadium: Kehrwegstadion

1 December 2021	K.V.C. Westerlo (2)	2–3	OH Leuven (1)	Westerlo
18:45 CET	Remmer 12'; Bernát 67'		De Norre 55'; Schrijvers 89'; Maertens 90+3'	Stadium: Het Kuipje

1 December 2021	Lommel (2)	0–2	K.A.A. Gent (1)	Lommel
20:00 CET			De Sart 18', 77' (pen.)	Stadium: Soevereinstadion

1 December 2021	K.V. Mechelen (1)	2–1 (a.e.t.)	K.S.V. Cercle Brugge (1)	Mechelen
20:30 CET	De Camargo 67'; Storm 117'		Somers 30'	Stadium: AFAS-stadion Achter de Kazerne

1 December 2021	K.V. Kortrijk (1)	1–0	K.V. Oostende (1)	Kortrijk
20:30 CET	Guèye 53'			Stadium: Guldensporen Stadion

1 December 2021	K.R.C. Genk (1)	3–3 (a.e.t.) (3–5 p)	Club Brugge (1)	Genk
20:45 CET	Thorstvedt 29'; Paintsil 45+2', 71'		Balanta 7'; De Ketelaere 69', 90'	Stadium: Cegeka Arena
	Penalties
	Hrošovský (penalty missed); Lucumí (penalty scored); Bongonda (penalty scored); Thorstvedt (penalty scored)		Dost (penalty scored); De Ketelaere (penalty scored); Rits (penalty scored); Ricca (penalty scored); Lang (penalty scored)

2 December 2021	Standard Liège (1)	2–0 (a.e.t.)	K Beerschot (1)	Liège
20:45 CET	Muleka 97'; Bokadi 119'			Stadium: Stade Maurice Dufrasne

== Quarter-finals ==
The draw for the quarter-finals was made right after the conclusion of the last match of the previous round.

22 December 2021	K.V. Mechelen (1)	1–3	K.A.S.Eupen (1)	Mechelen
20:00 CET	De Camargo 23'		Ngoy 55'; Prevljak 83', 90+6'	Stadium: Achter de Kazerne; Referee: Lothar D'Hondt

22 December 2021	K.A.A. Gent (1)	3–1	Standard Liège (1)	Ghent
20:30 CET	Kums 8'; Tissoudali 53', 90+3'		Dønnum 47'	Stadium: Ghelamco Arena; Referee: Jonathan Lardot

23 December 2021	R.S.C. Anderlecht (1)	3–0	K.V. Kortrijk (1)	Anderlecht
18:45 CET	Kouamé 35', 76'; Gómez 43'			Stadium: Constant Vanden Stock Stadium; Referee: Erik Lambrechts

23 December 2021	Club Brugge KV (1)	4–1	OH Leuven (1)	Bruges
21:00 CET	De Ketelaere 41'; Balanta 45+6'; Lang 65'; Vanaken 90+2'		Mercier 59'	Stadium: Jan Breydel Stadium; Referee: Bram van Driessche

== Semi-finals ==
The draw for the semi-finals was made right after the conclusion of the last match of the previous round.

=== First legs ===
2 February 2022	K.A.A. Gent (1)	0–1	Club Brugge (1)	Ghent
20:45 CET		Report	De Ketelaere 56'	Stadium: Ghelamco Arena; Referee: Nathan Verboomen

3 February 2022	K.A.S. Eupen (1)	2–2	R.S.C. Anderlecht (1)	Eupen
20:45 CET	Prevljak 16' (pen.); Peeters 78'		Refaelov 6' (pen.), 90+6' (pen.)	Stadium: Kehrwegstadion; Referee: Jonathan Lardot

=== Second legs ===
2 March 2022	Club Brugge (1)	0–3 (1–3 agg.)	K.A.A. Gent (1)	Bruges
20:45 CET		report	Odjidja-Ofoe 3'; Castro-Montes 36'; Depoitre 55'	Stadium: Jan Breydel Stadium; Attendance: 20,000; Referee: Erik Lambrechts

3 March 2022	R.S.C. Anderlecht (1)	3–1 (5–3 agg.)	K.A.S. Eupen (1)	Anderlecht
20:45 CET	Murillo 5'; Magallán 28'; Kouamé 47'	report	Prevljak 10'	Stadium: Constant Vanden Stock Stadium; Attendance: 20,000; Referee: Nicolas Laforge

== Final ==
18 April 2022
15:00 CEST

Gent	0–0 (a.e.t.)	Anderlecht
	Report
Penalties
De Sart (penalty scored); Hanche-Olsen (penalty scored); Castro-Montes (penalty scored); Lemajić (penalty scored); Ngadeu-Ngadjui (penalty missed)	4–3	(penalty scored) Gómez; (penalty scored) Raman; (penalty scored) Kana; (penalty missed) Cullen; (penalty missed) Murillo

King Baudouin Stadium, Brussels
Referee: Lawrence Visser

== Notes ==
1. Tie reversed after the original draw.
2. Bierbeek was forced to forfeit the game due to a positive COVID-19 test of one of its players, with the results of the testing for the other players not available in time for the match.
3. The match was originally played in Ninove on 21 August 2021 but was stopped in the first few minutes of the second half due to excessive rain and a waterlogged pitch. At that time, Lokeren was leading 1–2. One day later, the decision was made to replay the match entirely on 25 August 2021, but now on the field of Lokeren-Temse.
4. Tie reversed after the original draw, as the accommodation of Wellen was deemed insufficient.
