= Nakhid =

Nakhid is a surname. Notable people with the surname include:

- Ali Kazim Nakhid (born 2000), Trinidadian footballer
- David Nakhid (born 1964), Trinidad and Tobago politician and former footballer
- Camille Nakhid, Trinidadian social science professor
