= Galjé =

Galjé is a surname. Notable people with the surname include:

- Hans Galjé (born 1957), Dutch football player and manager
- Timothy Galjé (born 2001), Belgian footballer, nephew of Hans
