= Rayan Djedje =

French footballer (born 2001)

Personal information
- Date of birth: 4 July 2001 (age 25)
- Place of birth: Montpellier, France
- Height: 1.83 m (6 ft 0 in)
- Position: Midfielder

Youth career
- Rennes
- –2019: Metz

Senior career*
| Years | Team | Apps | (Gls) |
| 2019–2020 | Metz B | 13 | (0) |
| 2020–2022 | Metz | 0 | (0) |
| 2020–2022 | → Seraing (loan) | 8 | (0) |
| 2023–2024 | Charlotte Independence | 31 | (2) |
| 2025 | Sacramento Republic | 8 | (0) |
- * Club domestic league appearances and goals as of 21:58, 30 October 2025 (UTC)

Rayan Djedje (born 4 July 2001) is a French professional footballer who plays as a midfielder.

== Career ==
Rayan was acquired by Sacramento Republic FC from Charlotte Independence on February 14, 2025 for the 2025 USL Championship season. Djedje was released from his contract with Sacramento Republic FC by mutual consent on 26 February, 2026.

== Personal life ==
Born in France, Djedje is of Ivorian descent.

== Career statistics ==
As of match played 21 August 2021

| Club | Season | League | | | Cup | | Other | | Total | |
| Club | Season | Division | Apps | Goals | Apps | Goals | Apps | Goals | Apps | Goals |
|---|---|---|---|---|---|---|---|---|---|---|
| Metz B | 2019–20 | Championnat National 3 | 11 | 0 | — | | — | | 11 | 0 |
| Metz B | 2020–21 | Championnat National 2 | 2 | 0 | — | | — | | 2 | 0 |
| Metz B | Total | | 13 | 0 | — | | — | | 13 | 0 |
| Seraing (loan) | 2020–21 | Belgian First Division B | 1 | 0 | 1 | 0 | 0 | 0 | 2 | 0 |
| Seraing (loan) | 2021–22 | Belgian First Division A | 4 | 0 | 0 | 0 | 0 | 0 | 4 | 0 |
| Seraing (loan) | Total | | 5 | 0 | 1 | 0 | 0 | 0 | 6 | 0 |
| Career total | | | 18 | 0 | 1 | 0 | 0 | 0 | 19 | 0 |
