= Alban Shabani =

Kosovan footballer

Personal information
- Full name: Alban Shabani
- Date of birth: 18 May 2000 (age 26)
- Place of birth: Podujevë, Kosovo under UN administration
- Height: 1.78 m (5 ft 10 in)
- Position: Defensive midfielder

Team information
- Current team: Ferizaj

Youth career
- –2018: Llapi

Senior career*
Years	Team	Apps	(Gls)
2017–2020	Llapi	18	(0)
2020–2021	Skënderbeu Korçë	12	(0)
2021–2022	Feronikeli	17	(0)
2022	Drenica	4	(0)
2022–2023	Llapi	0	(0)
2022–2023	→ Feronikeli (loan)		
2023–2025	Feronikeli	51	(1)
2025	Laçi	9	(0)
2025–	Ferizaj	31	(0)
2026–	Trepça	0	(0)

International career^{‡}
2020	Kosovo U21	2	(0)
- * Club domestic league appearances and goals as of 22 June 2026 ‡ National team caps and goals as of 17 November 2020

Alban Shabani (born 18 May 2000) is a Kosovan professional footballer who plays as a defensive midfielder for Ferizaj.

== Club career ==
=== Skënderbeu Korçë ===
On 22 October 2020, Shabani signed a four-year contract with Kategoria Superiore club Skënderbeu Korçë and received squad number 6. Ten days later, he made his debut with Skënderbeu Korçë in the 2020–21 Albanian Cup first round against Tomori after coming on as a substitute at 76th minute in place of Uerdi Mara. Three days after debut, Shabani made his first Kategoria Superiore appearance after coming on as a substitute at 80th minute in place of Uerdi Mara in a 1–1 away draw against Teuta Durrës.

== International career ==
=== Under-19 ===
On 2 October 2018, Shabani was named as part of the Kosovo U19 squad for 2019 UEFA European Under-19 Championship qualifications, he was an unused substitute in these matches.

=== Under-21 ===
On 6 November 2020, Shabani received a call-up from Kosovo U21 for the 2021 UEFA European Under-21 Championship qualification matches against Albania U21 and Turkey U21. Seven days later, he made his debut with Kosovo U21 in the match against Albania U21 after coming on as a substitute at 76th minute in place of Arton Zekaj.
