= El Hadji Gueye =

Senegalese footballer (born 1999)

Personal information
- Full name: El Hadji Arfang Gueye
- Date of birth: 20 August 1999 (age 27)
- Place of birth: Senegal
- Height: 1.85 m (6 ft 1 in)
- Position: Centre-back

Team information
- Current team: Arsimi

Youth career
- –2018: Dakar Sacré-Cœur

Senior career*
Years	Team	Apps	(Gls)
2018–2020	Lille B	18	(1)
2020–2022	Mouscron	8	(0)
2024–2026	Shkupi	23	(3)
2026	Ferizaj	7	(1)
2026–	Arsimi	0	(0)
- * Club domestic league appearances and goals as of 22 June 2026

El Hadji Arfang Gueye (born 20 August 1999) is a Senegalese professional footballer who plays as a centre-back for Arsimi.

== Career ==
In August 2018, Gueye signed for French club Lille from Senegalese club Dakar Sacré-Cœur. On 6 August 2020, Gueye was transferred to Belgian club Mouscron. In July 2024, after two years as a free agent, he signed for Macedonian club Shkupi.
