= Maxime Mignon =

Belgian footballer

Personal information
- Date of birth: 17 August 1990 (age 36)
- Place of birth: Visé, Belgium
- Height: 1.84 m (6 ft 0 in)
- Position: Goalkeeper

Team information
- Current team: RFCU Kelmis
- Number: 90

Senior career*
Years	Team	Apps	(Gls)
–2015	AS Houtain-Minalello		
2015–2022	Seraing	97	(0)
2022–2023	URSL Visé	26	(0)
2023–	RFCU Kelmis	60	(0)
- * Club domestic league appearances and goals as of 20 January 2026

Maxime Mignon (born 17 August 1990) is a Belgian footballer who plays as a goalkeeper for RFCU Kelmis.

== Club career ==
On 30 June 2022, Mignon joined URSL Visé in the third-tier Belgian National Division 1 on a one-year contract with an option for a second year.
