= Josh Cullen (footballer, born 1996) =

Irish footballer (born 1996)

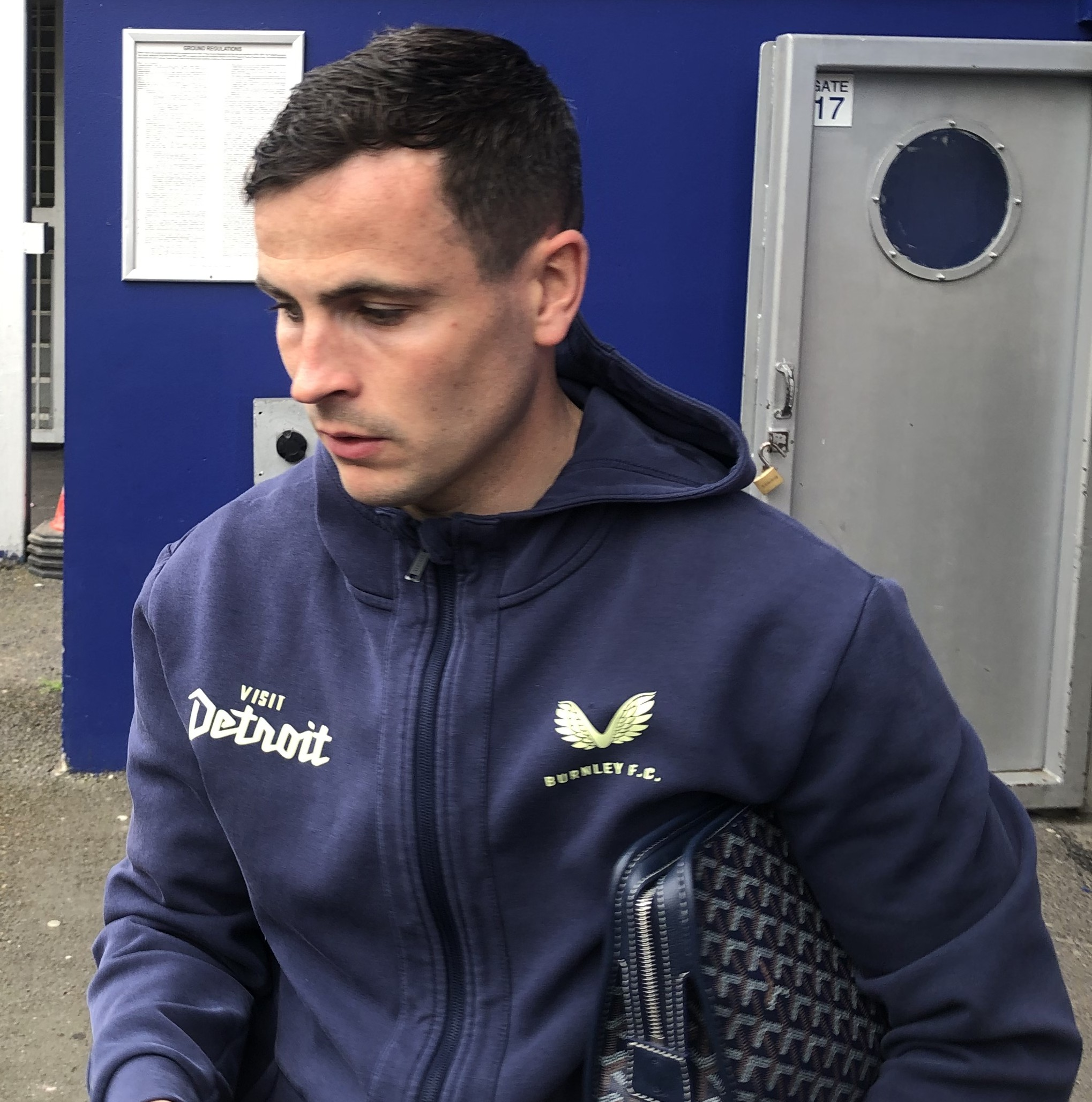
- Cullen with Burnley in 2025

Personal information
- Full name: Joshua Jon Cullen
- Date of birth: 7 April 1996 (age 30)
- Place of birth: Westcliff-on-Sea, England
- Height: 5 ft 9 in (1.75 m)
- Position: Defensive midfielder

Team information
- Current team: Burnley
- Number: 24

Youth career
- 2005–2015: West Ham United

Senior career*
Years	Team	Apps	(Gls)
2015–2020	West Ham United	3	(0)
2016	→ Bradford City (loan)	15	(0)
2016–2017	→ Bradford City (loan)	40	(1)
2017–2018	→ Bolton Wanderers (loan)	12	(0)
2018–2019	→ Charlton Athletic (loan)	29	(1)
2019–2020	→ Charlton Athletic (loan)	34	(1)
2020–2022	Anderlecht	67	(1)
2022–	Burnley	133	(6)

International career^{‡}
2011	England U16	1	(0)
2014–2015	Republic of Ireland U19	3	(0)
2015–2018	Republic of Ireland U21	19	(1)
2019–	Republic of Ireland	47	(0)
- * Club domestic league appearances and goals as of 09:45, 8 November 2026 (UTC) ‡ National team caps and goals as of 16:13, 16 November 2025 (UTC)

Joshua Jon Cullen (born 7 April 1996) is a professional footballer who plays as a defensive midfielder for, and captains EFL Championship club Burnley. He also plays for the Republic of Ireland national team.

Cullen has previously played for West Ham United, Anderlecht, and on loan for Bradford City, Bolton Wanderers, and Charlton Athletic.

== Early life ==
Cullen was born in Westcliff-on-Sea, Essex, England. His grandparents on his father's side were from County Leitrim, Ireland. He played junior football for Rayleigh Boys before joining West Ham United at the age of nine. He attended St Thomas More High School.

== Club career ==
=== West Ham United ===
Cullen was first included in a West Ham matchday squad for their Premier League fixture against Arsenal at the Emirates Stadium on 14 March 2015, remaining an unused substitute as they lost 3–0. He was also called up and unused on 9 May, as West Ham lost 1–0 at Aston Villa.

On 2 July 2015, he made his first-team debut for the club in a 3–0 home victory over Lusitanos of Andorra in the UEFA Europa League first qualifying round first leg, replacing Joey O'Brien after 60 minutes; he started in their 1–0 victory in the second leg a week later, making way for Amos Nasha after 63 minutes. With manager Slaven Bilić putting priority on the team's Premier League performance, he made an array of changes for their third qualifying round to Astra Giurgiu on 6 August, including starting Cullen in his first competitive match against a professional opponent. Twenty-three days later he made his Premier League debut, replacing Diafra Sakho at the end of a 3–0 win over Liverpool at Anfield.

Cullen returned from loan at Bolton Wanderers in January 2018 making an appearance in the FA Cup away at Shrewsbury Town. He was praised for his performance by West Ham manager, David Moyes, in a poor performance by West Ham which ended 0–0. Cullen also had two front teeth kicked-out accidentally by Shrewsbury player Abu Ogogo.

In the summer of 2020, Cullen returned to his parent club at the end of his loan to Charlton Athletic, where he immediately impressed in West Ham's EFL Cup tie with Charlton. He received significant praise from manager David Moyes after the game. Before West Ham's EFL Cup fixture with Hull City on 23 September 2020, Cullen returned a positive test for COVID-19 along with manager David Moyes and teammate Issa Diop.

==== Loans to Bradford City ====
Cullen signed on loan for Bradford City in February 2016. In March 2016 his loan was extended until the end of the 2015–16 season.

On 8 August 2016, Cullen re-signed for Bradford City on a five-month loan deal. He scored his first league goal for the club in the 2–1 victory at MK Dons on 16 August 2016. His loan at the club was extended on 3 January 2017 until the end of the season.

==== Loan to Bolton Wanderers ====
On 1 August 2017, Cullen, along with West Ham teammate Reece Burke, joined Bolton Wanderers on loan until the following January.

==== Loan to Charlton Athletic ====
On 30 August 2018, Cullen joined Charlton Athletic on loan until the end of the 2018–19 season. He dislocated his shoulder on 6 November 2018 playing against Walsall, leaving the pitch in the 80th minute. He returned to the first team in January 2019 against Accrington Stanley. On 26 May 2019, Cullen played the full 90 minutes of the League One play-off final as Charlton won 2–1 to return to the Championship. Having spent the season on-loan, he returned to West Ham and played in several pre 2019–20 season friendlies. In August 2019, he returned to Charlton on-loan for the 2019–20 season.

=== Anderlecht ===
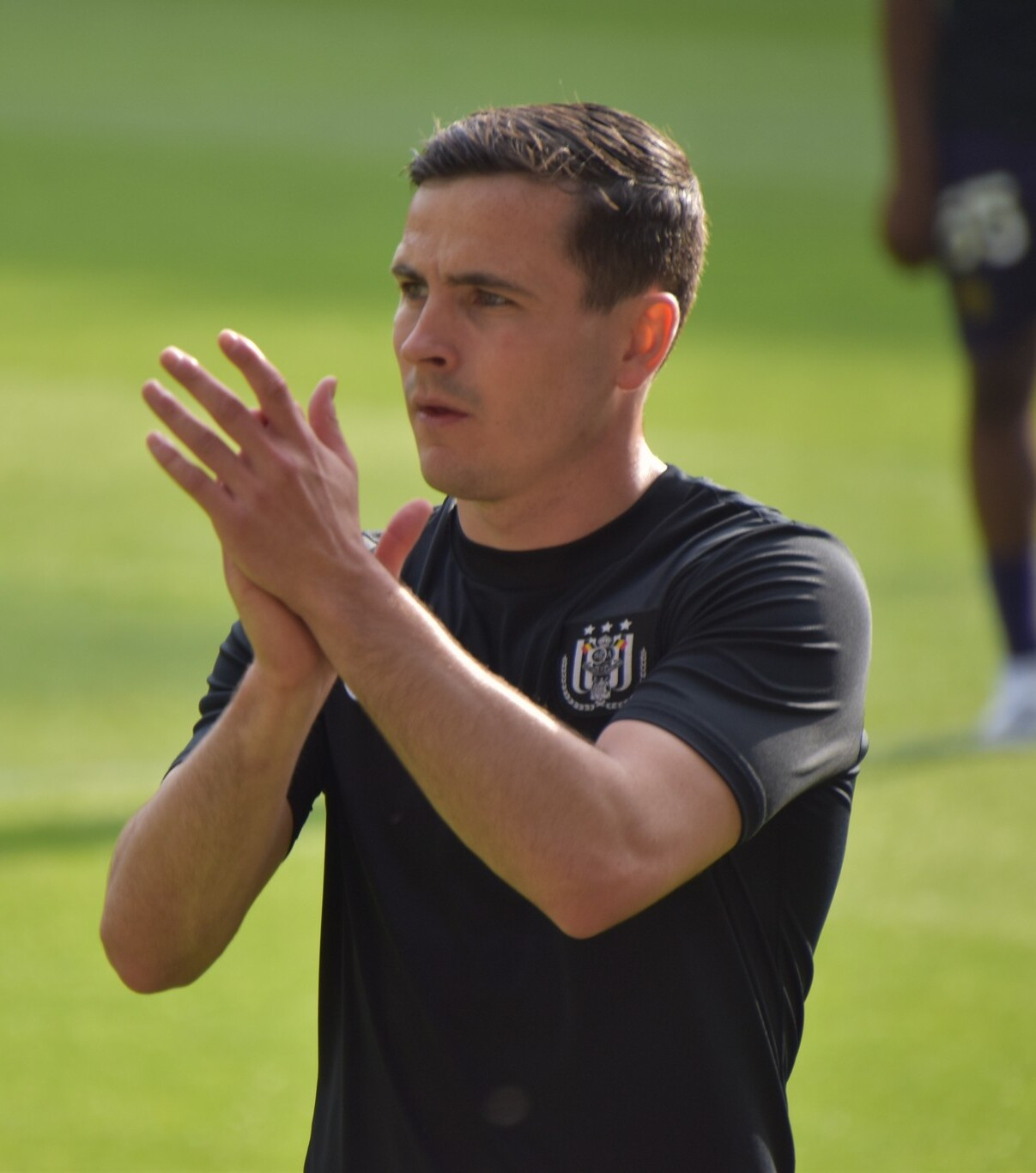
Cullen in 2022

On 5 October 2020, Cullen joined Belgian First Division A side Anderlecht on a permanent deal until 30 June 2023, after fifteen years at West Ham. He sent an emotional farewell message to West Ham fans on 12 October 2020 thanking them for their support and citing Mark Noble as one of his heroes. Upon joining Anderlecht, Sporting director Peter Verbeken described Cullen as "a true team player known for his winning mentality." On 22 January 2021, Cullen captained Anderlecht for the first time in a 0–0 draw against Waasland-Beveren, in only his 13th appearance for the club.

=== Burnley ===
On 12 July 2022, Burnley signed Cullen on a three-year contract for an undisclosed fee. He made his Burnley debut on 29 July 2022 in a 1–0 away win against Huddersfield Town. His debut performance was described by the BBC as "superb". Cullen captained the team for the first time on 25 February 2023 against Huddersfield Town. He scored his first goal for The Clarets on 30 December 2022 in Burnley's 0–1 win against Stoke City F.C. at bet365 Stadium.

Cullen suffered an anterior cruciate ligament injury to his right knee at Turf Moor on 27 December 2025, necessitating surgery, in a 0–0 draw against Everton.

After 300 days out injured, he returned to the pitch with Burnley's under 21s against West Ham under 21s.

== International career ==
Having already played for England U16 in 2011, He made his debut for Republic of Ireland U19 in September 2014, in a 1–0 victory against Netherlands U19. On 4 September 2015, he made his debut for Republic of Ireland U21 in a 4–1 victory against Qatar U23 in a friendly at Gigg Lane. On 25 March 2017, Cullen captained the Republic of Ireland U21s to a win 1–0 win over Kosovo U21 in a UEFA Under-21 has Championship Qualifier.

On 15 March 2019, Cullen received his first international call-up to the senior Republic of Ireland national team. He made his full debut on 10 September 2019, playing the full 90 minutes in a 3–1 win against Bulgaria.

== Career statistics ==
=== Club ===
As of match played 7 November 2026

Appearances and goals by club, season and competition
Club	Season	League			National cup (Note: Includes FA Cup, Belgian Cup)		League cup (Note: Includes EFL Cup)		Europe		Other		Total	
Club	Season	Division	Apps	Goals	Apps	Goals	Apps	Goals	Apps	Goals	Apps	Goals	Apps	Goals
West Ham United	2014–15	Premier League	0	0	0	0	0	0	—		—		0	0
West Ham United	2015–16	Premier League	1	0	0	0	0	0	3 (Note: Appearances in UEFA Europa League)	0	—		4	0
West Ham United	2016–17	Premier League	0	0	—		—		0	0	—		0	0
West Ham United	2017–18	Premier League	2	0	3	0	0	0	—		—		5	0
West Ham United	2018–19	Premier League	0	0	—		0	0	—		—		0	0
West Ham United	2019–20	Premier League	0	0	—		—		—		—		0	0
West Ham United	2020–21	Premier League	0	0	0	0	1	0	—		—		1	0
West Ham United	Total		3	0	3	0	1	0	3	0	—		10	0
Bradford City (loan)	2015–16	League One	15	0	—		—		—		2 (Note: Appearances in the League One Play-Offs)	0	17	0
Bradford City (loan)	2016–17	League One	40	1	0	0	0	0	—		6 (Note: Three appearances in EFL Trophy and three in the League One Play-Offs)	0	46	1
Bolton Wanderers (loan)	2017–18	Championship	12	0	—		—		—		—		12	0
Charlton Athletic (loan)	2018–19	League One	29	1	0	0	—		—		3	0	32	1
Charlton Athletic (loan)	2019–20	Championship	34	1	0	0	0	0	—		—		34	1
Anderlecht	2020–21	Belgian First Division A	27	0	3	0	—		—		—		30	0
Anderlecht	2021–22	Belgian First Division A	40	1	6	0	—		4 (Note: Appearances in UEFA Europa Conference League)	0	—		50	1
Anderlecht	Total		67	1	9	0	—		4	0	—		80	1
Burnley	2022–23	Championship	43	1	5	0	2	0	—		—		50	1
Burnley	2023–24	Premier League	25	2	1	0	2	0	—		—		28	2
Burnley	2024–25	Championship	44	2	0	0	0	0	—		—		44	2
Burnley	2025–26	Premier League	18	2	0	0	0	0	—		—		18	2
Burnley	2026–27	Championship	3	0	0	0	0	0	—		—		3	0
Burnley	Total		133	7	6	0	4	0	—		—		143	7
Career total			333	11	18	0	5	0	7	0	11	0	374	11

=== International ===
As of match played 16 November 2025

Appearances and goals by national team and year
National team	Year	Apps	Goals
Republic of Ireland	2019	2	0
Republic of Ireland	2020	2	0
Republic of Ireland	2021	11	0
Republic of Ireland	2022	8	0
Republic of Ireland	2023	9	0
Republic of Ireland	2024	8	0
Republic of Ireland	2025	7	0
Total		47	0

== Honours ==
Charlton Athletic

- EFL League One play-offs: 2019

Anderlecht

- Belgian Cup runner-up: 2021–22

Burnley

- EFL Championship: 2022–23

Individual

- EFL Young Player of the Month: April 2017
- Republic of Ireland U21 Player of the Year: 2018
- Republic of Ireland Senior Player of the Year: 2021
