= Ali Kazim Nakhid =

Trinidadian footballer (born 2000)

Personal information
- Date of birth: 22 January 2000 (age 26)
- Place of birth: Beirut, Lebanon
- Height: 1.93 m (6 ft 4 in)
- Position: Midfielder

Team information
- Current team: Ferizaj

College career
Years	Team	Apps	(Gls)
2018–2019	UMBC Retrievers	8	(0)
2021–2022	Goucher Gophers	37	(14)
2023	Thomas More Saints	19	(8)

Senior career*
Years	Team	Apps	(Gls)
2020–2021	Fursan Hispania	9	(0)
2024	Duluth FC		
2024–2025	Gulf United	5	(0)
2025	Al Jazirah Al Hamra	1	(0)
2025–2026	Al-Ittifaq	6	(0)
2026–	Ferizaj		

International career^{‡}
2026–	Trinidad and Tobago	1	(0)
- * Club domestic league appearances and goals as of 31 August 2026 ‡ National team caps and goals as of 30 May 2026

Ali Kazim Nakhid (born 22 January 2000) is a professional footballer who plays as a midfielder for Kosovan club Ferizaj. Born in Lebanon, he plays for the Trinidad and Tobago national team.

== Early life ==
Nakhid was born on 22 January 2000 in Beirut, Lebanon. He is the son of Trinidad and Tobago international David Nakhid, who is of Lebanese origin.

== College career ==
Nakhid attended the University of Maryland, Baltimore County in the United States, playing for their soccer team between 2018 and 2019. Following his stint there, he attended Goucher College, where he was the vice-president of the student government and played for their soccer team between 2021 and 2022. In 2023 Nakhid played for Thomas More University's team, the Thomas More Saints.

== Club career ==
Nakhid started his senior career in the United Arab Emirates, where he played for UAE Second Division side Fursan Hispania, collecting nine appearances during the 2020–21 season. He then played for American side Duluth FC in 2024. The same year, he signed for UAE First Division side Gulf United, playing five games in the 2024–25 season. In February 2025, he moved to Division 1 side Al Jazirah Al Hamra, playing one game in 2024–25. Ahead of the 2025–26 season, Nakhid signed for Emirati side Al-Ittifaq.

== International career ==
Nakhid was born in Lebanon, and is of Trinidadian descent through his father. He was called up to the Trinidad and Tobago national football team for a set of friendlies in May 2026.
