= David Nakhid =

Trinidadian footballer (born 1964)

Personal information
- Date of birth: 15 May 1964 (age 62)
- Place of birth: Port of Spain, Trinidad and Tobago
- Height: 1.79 m (5 ft 10 in)
- Position: Midfielder

College career
Years	Team	Apps	(Gls)
1985–1987	American University		

Senior career*
Years	Team	Apps	(Gls)
1987–1988	Baltimore Blast	14	(2)
1990–1992	KSV Waregem	42	(3)
1992–1994	Grasshopper	41	(5)
1994–1995	PAOK	0	(0)
1995–1997	Al-Ansar		
1997	Joe Public	12	(0)
1998	New England Revolution	18	(0)
1999	Malmö	0	(0)
1999–2000	Emirates		
2000–2003	Al-Ansar		
2003–2005	Mabarra		
2005	Caledonia AIA		

International career
1992–2005	Trinidad and Tobago	35	(8)

Managerial career
- 2002–2004: Mabarra
- 2005: Caledonia AIA
- 2011: Racing Beirut
- * Club domestic league appearances and goals

David Nakhid (born 15 May 1964) is a Trinidad and Tobago politician and former professional footballer who serves as a Senator for the United National Congress.

He played as a midfielder and represented Trinidad and Tobago internationally between 1992 and 2005, playing in three CONCACAF Gold Cup editions: 1996, 1998, and 2000. He later entered the Senate of Trinidad and Tobago.

== Football career ==
=== Club career ===
After playing college soccer at American University, Nakhid played as a professional in Belgium, Switzerland, Greece, Lebanon, Trinidad and Tobago, the United States, Sweden, and the United Arab Emirates for KSV Waregem, Grasshopper, PAOK, Al-Ansar, Joe Public, New England Revolution, Emirates Club, Al-Mabarrah, and Caledonia AIA.

=== International career ===
Nakhid also played for the Trinidad and Tobago national team between 1992 and 2005, scoring 8 goals in 35 games, including playing in six FIFA World Cup qualifying matches.

On 26 March 1995, while playing in Lebanon for Ansar, Nakhid played a friendly against the Egypt national team as part of a "select" team of Nejmeh and Ansar players. The match ended 1–1, with Nakhid scoring his side's only goal.

=== Managerial career ===
In 2002 Nakhid coached Lebanese side Mabarra, while in 2011 he coached Racing Beirut.

== Political career ==
Nakhid is a senator for the United National Congress. He was appointed Parliamentary Secretary in the Ministry of Sport and Youth Affairs on 22 May 2025 by Kamla Persad-Bissessar.

== Personal life ==
Born in Trinidad and Tobago, Nakhid is of Lebanese descent. His son Ali Kazim Nakhid is also a professional footballer. David runs the David Nakhid International Football School.

On 16 October 2015, he announced that he had the five nominations from football associations to become a FIFA President candidate. Twelve days later, his campaign was over after it was found that U.S. Virgin Islands Soccer Federation had nominated two candidates, both nominations had been declared null by FIFA but the other unnamed candidate had more than the minimum five nominations and was able to continue his campaign. Nakhid announced his decision to appeal.
