= Sami Lahssaini =

Belgian-Moroccan footballer (born 1998)

Personal information
- Date of birth: 18 September 1998 (age 28)
- Place of birth: Liège, Belgium
- Height: 1.79 m (5 ft 10 in)
- Position: Midfielder

Team information
- Current team: Patro Eisden
- Number: 15

Youth career
- Standard Liège
- –2017: Seraing

Senior career*
Years	Team	Apps	(Gls)
2017–2019	Seraing	43	(1)
2019–2020	Metz B	8	(0)
2019–2024	Metz	0	(0)
2019	→ Seraing (loan)	12	(0)
2020–2022	→ Seraing (loan)	36	(0)
2022–2023	→ Seraing (loan)	22	(0)
2024	→ RAAL La Louvière (loan)	7	(0)
2024–2026	RAAL La Louvière	52	(1)
2026–	Patro Eisden	2	(0)
- * Club domestic league appearances and goals as of 20 September 2026

Sami Lahssaini (born 18 September 1998) is a Belgian professional footballer who plays as a midfielder for Challenger Pro League club Patro Eisden.

== Club career ==
On 21 July 2022, Lahssaini returned to Seraing for another loan.

On 25 January 2024, Lahssaini returned to Belgium once again and joined RAAL La Louvière on loan.

== Career statistics ==
As of match played 24 July 2021

Appearances and goals by club, season and competition
Club	Season	League			Cup		Other		Total	
Club	Season	Division	Apps	Goals	Apps	Goals	Apps	Goals	Apps	Goals
Seraing	2017–18	Belgian First Amateur Division	28	1	0	0	0	0	28	1
Seraing	2018–19	Belgian First Amateur Division	15	0	0	0	0	0	15	0
Seraing	Total		43	1	0	0	0	0	43	1
Seraing (loan)	2018–19	Belgian First Amateur Division	12	0	0	0	0	0	12	0
Metz B	2019–20	Championnat National 3	8	0	—		—		8	0
Seraing (loan)	2020–21	Belgian First Division B	21	1	2	0	2 (Note: Appearances in the Belgian First Division A promotion-relegation play-off.)	0	25	1
Seraing (loan)	2021–22	Belgian First Division A	1	0	0	0	0	0	1	0
Seraing (loan)	Total		22	1	2	0	2	0	26	1
Career total			85	2	2	0	2	0	89	2
