= Hans Galjé =

Dutch football player and coach

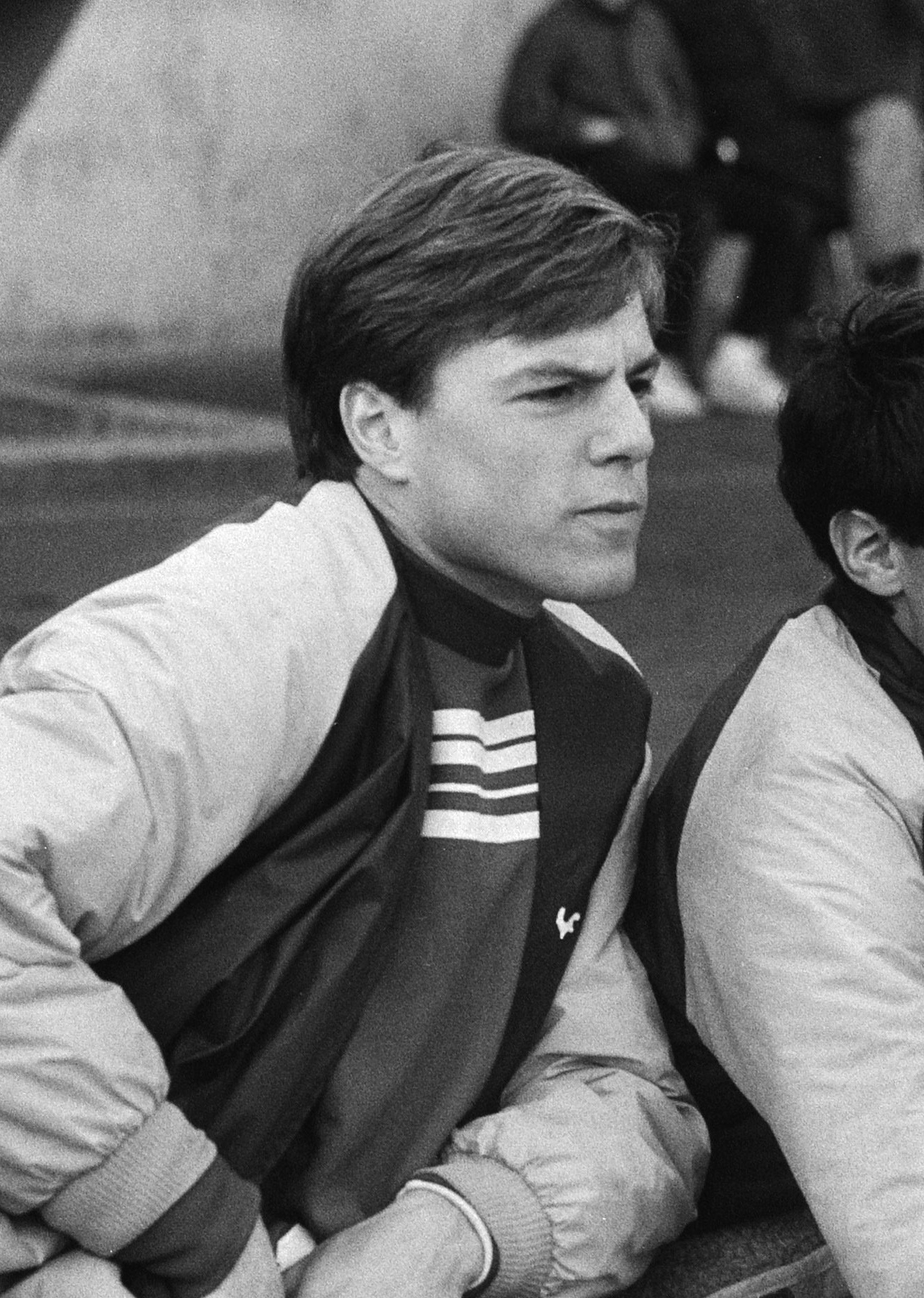
- Galjé in 1982

Personal information
- Date of birth: 21 February 1957 (age 69)
- Place of birth: Delft, Netherlands
- Position: Goalkeeper

Youth career
- DHL

Senior career*
Years	Team	Apps	(Gls)
1976–1980	FC Den Haag	119	(0)
1980–1986	Ajax	70	(0)
1986	→ FC Utrecht (loan)	15	(0)
1986–1988	Kortrijk	31	(0)
1988–1990	Waregem	82	(0)
1990–1994	Club Brugge	10	(0)
Total		327	(0)

Managerial career
- 2009: Mouscron
- * Club domestic league appearances and goals

Hans Galjé (born 21 February 1957) is a Dutch football coach and former professional player. During his playing career, he played as a goalkeeper for FC Den Haag, Ajax, FC Utrecht, KV Kortrijk, KSV Waregem and Club Brugge. He was manager of Belgian side Mouscron in the final months of its existence.

Born in Delft, Galjé started his professional career at FC Den Haag and was snapped up by Dutch giants Ajax for 600,000 guilders in 1980. He became a reserve behind first goalkeeper Piet Schrijvers and was loaned out to FC Utrecht before moving abroad to play the rest of his career in Belgium.

After retiring as a player, Galjé worked as goalkeeping coach at Mouscron and the Belgium national football team. He also worked as a scout and was technical director at KSV Roeselare.

== Personal life ==
Hans's nephew Timothy is also a footballer.
