= Elias Spago =

Belgian footballer

Personal information
- Full name: Elias Spago
- Date of birth: 9 August 2001 (age 25)
- Place of birth: Belgium
- Height: 1.86 m (6 ft 1 in)
- Position: Centre-back

Team information
- Current team: Olympic Charleroi
- Number: 28

Youth career
- Royal Charleroi
- –2018: Châtelet
- 2018–2020: Sint-Truiden
- 2020–2021: Seraing

Senior career*
Years	Team	Apps	(Gls)
2021–2024	Seraing	15	(0)
2022–2023	→ Virton (loan)	6	(0)
2024–	Olympic Charleroi	39	(3)
- * Club domestic league appearances and goals as of 21 January 2026

Elias Spago (born 9 August 2001) is a Belgian professional footballer who plays as a centre-back for Challenger Pro League club Olympic Charleroi.
