= Sergio Gómez (footballer, born 2000) =

Spanish footballer

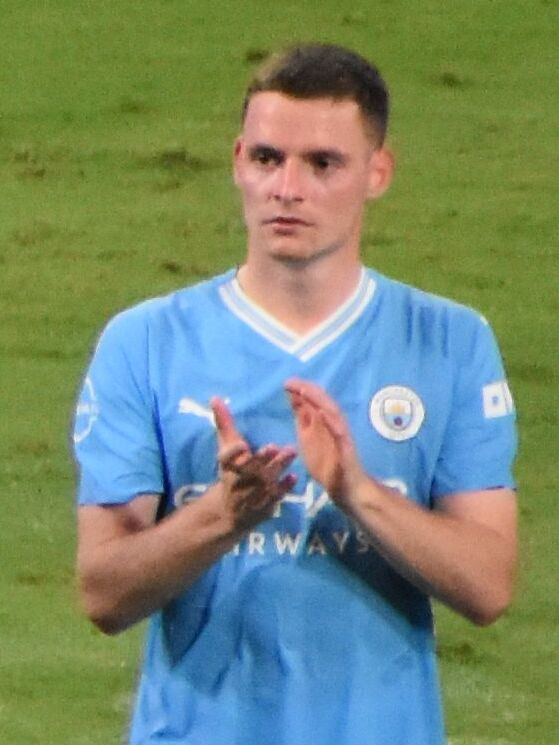
- Gómez with Manchester City in 2023

Personal information
- Full name: Sergio Gómez Martín
- Date of birth: 4 September 2000 (age 26)
- Place of birth: Badalona, Spain
- Height: 1.71 m (5 ft 7 in)
- Positions: Left wing-back; attacking midfielder

Team information
- Current team: Real Sociedad
- Number: 17

Youth career
- 2006–2008: Trajana
- 2008–2009: Badalona
- 2009–2010: Espanyol
- 2010–2018: Barcelona
- 2018–2019: Borussia Dortmund

Senior career*
Years	Team	Apps	(Gls)
2017–2018	Barcelona B	2	(0)
2018–2019	Borussia Dortmund II	14	(2)
2018–2021	Borussia Dortmund	2	(0)
2019–2021	→ Huesca (loan)	65	(1)
2021–2022	Anderlecht	40	(6)
2022–2024	Manchester City	18	(0)
2024–	Real Sociedad	82	(2)

International career^{‡}
2016	Spain U16	3	(0)
2016–2017	Spain U17	23	(9)
2018	Spain U18	4	(2)
2018–2019	Spain U19	15	(1)
2019–2023	Spain U21	19	(9)
2024	Spain U23	6	(1)
2024–	Spain	2	(0)
2024–	Catalonia	2	(0)
Medal record
Men's football
Representing Spain
Olympic Games
Gold medal – first place	2024 Paris	Team
UEFA European Under-21 Championship
Runner-up	2023 Georgia–Romania	Team
UEFA European Under-19 Championship
Winner	2019 Armenia	Team
Mediterranean Games
Winner	2018 Spain
FIFA U-17 World Cup
Runner-up	2017 India	Team
UEFA European Under-17 Championship
Winner	2017 Croatia	Team
- * Club domestic league appearances and goals as of 25 October 2026 (UTC) ‡ National team caps and goals as of 4 June 2026 (UTC)

Sergio Gómez Martín (born 4 September 2000) is a Spanish professional footballer who plays as a left wing-back or attacking midfielder for La Liga club Real Sociedad and the Spain national team.

== Club career ==
=== Barcelona ===
Born in Badalona, Barcelona, Catalonia, Gómez joined Barcelona's youth setup in 2010, after stints at Trajana, Badalona and Espanyol. After progressing through the youth setup, he made his senior debut with the reserves on 6 January 2018, coming on as a late substitute for Abel Ruiz in a 1–1 away draw against Real Zaragoza in the Segunda División.

=== Borussia Dortmund ===
On 30 January 2018, Gómez signed with Bundesliga side Borussia Dortmund. He initially played with the team's U19 side before joining the senior squad, with a scheduled start date of 1 July 2019. He made his debut for the senior squad on 8 April 2018 in 3–0 Bundesliga win against VfB Stuttgart.

Gómez joined Spanish second division club Huesca on loan for the 2019–20 season on 12 August 2019. On 1 September of the following year, after helping in the club's promotion to La Liga, his loan was extended for a further campaign.

=== Anderlecht ===
On 30 June 2021, Gómez signed for Belgian club Anderlecht on a permanent transfer, signing a contract until 2025. at the end of his first season in Belgium, Gómez made 49 appearances for Anderlecht across all competitions and was named the club's player of the season.

=== Manchester City ===
Gómez signed for Premier League club Manchester City on 16 August 2022 on a four-year contract. On 27 August, Gómez made his City debut as a substitute for Erling Haaland in a 4–2 home league victory over Crystal Palace. He made his UEFA Champions League debut against Sevilla on 6 September 2022.

=== Real Sociedad ===
On 12 July 2024, Gómez joined Spanish side Real Sociedad by signing a contract until 2030.

== International career ==
Gómez made his debut for the Spain national team on 12 October 2024 in a UEFA Nations League game against Denmark. He substituted Lamine Yamal in added time, as Spain won 1–0.

== Career statistics ==
=== Club ===
As of match played 25 October 2026

Appearances and goals by club, season and competition
Club	Season	League			National cup (Note: Includes DFB-Pokal, Copa del Rey, Belgian Cup, FA Cup)		League cup (Note: Includes EFL Cup)		Europe		Other		Total	
Club	Season	Division	Apps	Goals	Apps	Goals	Apps	Goals	Apps	Goals	Apps	Goals	Apps	Goals
Barcelona B	2017–18	Segunda División	2	0	—		—		—		—		2	0
Borussia Dortmund	2017–18	Bundesliga	2	0	0	0	—		0	0	0	0	2	0
Borussia Dortmund	2018–19	Bundesliga	0	0	0	0	—		1 (Note: Appearance(s) in UEFA Champions League)	0	—		1	0
Borussia Dortmund	Total		2	0	0	0	—		1	0	0	0	3	0
Borussia Dortmund II	2018–19	Regionalliga	14	2	—		—		—		—		14	2
Huesca (loan)	2019–20	Segunda División	36	1	1	0	—		—		—		37	1
Huesca (loan)	2020–21	La Liga	29	0	2	0	—		—		—		31	0
Huesca (loan)	Total		65	1	3	0	—		—		—		68	1
Anderlecht	2021–22	Belgian Pro League	39	6	6	1	—		4 (Note: Appearances in UEFA Europa League)	0	—		49	7
Anderlecht	2022–23	Belgian Pro League	1	0	—		—		—		—		1	0
Anderlecht	Total		40	6	6	1	—		4	0	—		50	7
Manchester City	2022–23	Premier League	12	0	4	0	2	0	5	0	—		23	0
Manchester City	2023–24	Premier League	6	0	2	0	1	0	5	0	1 (Note: Appearance in FIFA Club World Cup)	0	15	0
Manchester City	Total		18	0	6	0	3	0	10	0	1	0	38	0
Real Sociedad	2024–25	La Liga	37	2	6	2	—		6	1	—		49	5
Real Sociedad	2025–26	La Liga	35	0	8	0	—		—		—		43	0
Real Sociedad	2026–27	La Liga	10	0	0	0	—		3	3	0	0	13	3
Real Sociedad	Total		82	2	14	2	—		9	4	0	0	105	8
Career total			223	11	29	3	3	0	24	4	1	0	280	17

=== International ===
As of match played 4 June 2026

Appearances and goals by national team and year
National team	Year	Apps	Goals
Spain	2024	1	0
Spain	2025	0	0
Spain	2026	1	0
Total		2	0

== Honours ==
Barcelona Juvenil

- UEFA Youth League: 2017–18

Huesca

- Segunda División: 2019–20

Manchester City

- Premier League: 2022–23, 2023–24
- FA Cup: 2022–23
- UEFA Champions League: 2022–23
- UEFA Super Cup: 2023
- FIFA Club World Cup: 2023

Real Sociedad

- Copa del Rey: 2025–26

Spain U17

- UEFA European Under-17 Championship: 2017

Spain U18

- Mediterranean Games gold medal: 2018

Spain U19

- UEFA European Under-19 Championship: 2019

Spain U23

- Summer Olympics gold medal: 2024

Individual

- FIFA U-17 World Cup Silver Ball: 2017
- Anderlecht Player of the Season: 2021–22
- UEFA European Under-21 Championship Team of the Tournament: 2023
