= Timothy Galjé =

Belgian footballer (born 2001)

Personal information
- Date of birth: 5 June 2001 (age 25)
- Place of birth: Duffel, Belgium
- Height: 1.80 m (5 ft 11 in)
- Position: Goalkeeper

Team information
- Current team: K Heers VV

Youth career
- Excelsior Kaart
- Donk
- Beerschot
- Lierse
- –2016: Club Brugge
- 2016–2020: Standard Liège

Senior career*
Years	Team	Apps	(Gls)
2020–2024	Seraing	9	(0)
2024–	K Heers VV		

International career
2015–2016	Belgium U15	4	(0)
2016	Belgium U16	1	(0)
2018	Belgium U17	3	(0)
- * Club domestic league appearances and goals as of 13 October 2023

Timothy Galjé (born 5 June 2001) is a Belgian professional footballer who plays as a goalkeeper for Belgian club K Heers VV.

== Club career ==
On 17 October 2020, Galjé signed for Seraing. On 22 May 2021, he extended his contract with the club, signing a one-year contract with an option for a further year. Galjé made his debut for Seraing in a 3–0 Belgian Cup win over Lokeren-Temse on 15 September 2021. His league debut came in a 4–0 Belgian First Division A loss to Union Saint-Gilloise on 18 January 2022.

== Personal life ==
Timothy's uncle Hans is a former footballer.
