= Christian Kouamé =

Ivorian footballer (born 1997)

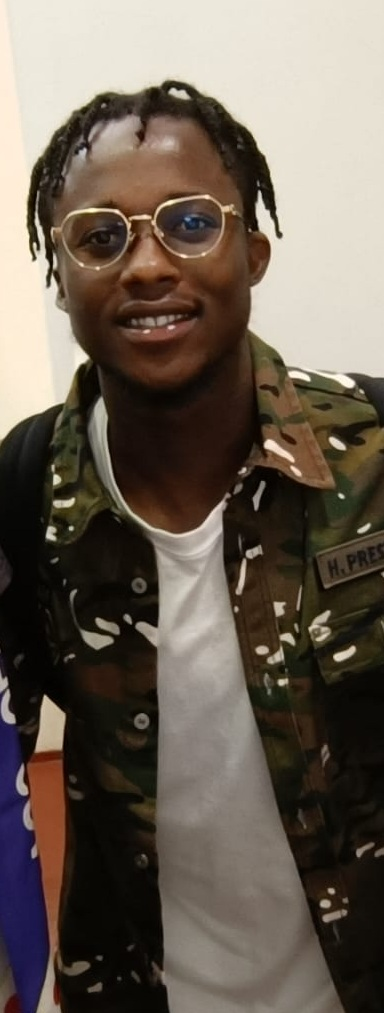
- Kouamé in 2024

Personal information
- Full name: Christian Michael Kouamé Kouakou
- Date of birth: 6 December 1997 (age 28)
- Place of birth: Abidjan, Ivory Coast
- Height: 1.85 m (6 ft 1 in)
- Positions: Forward; winger

Team information
- Current team: Aris
- Number: 8

Youth career
- –2015: Prato
- 2014–2015: → Sassuolo (loan)
- 2016: → Internazionale (loan)

Senior career*
Years	Team	Apps	(Gls)
2015–2017	Prato	13	(0)
2016–2017	→ Cittadella (loan)	15	(2)
2017–2018	Cittadella	40	(11)
2018–2020	Genoa	49	(9)
2020	→ Fiorentina (loan)	7	(1)
2020–2026	Fiorentina	104	(7)
2021–2022	→ Anderlecht (loan)	31	(8)
2025	→ Empoli (loan)	8	(0)
2026–	Aris	19	(5)

International career^{‡}
2019	Ivory Coast U23	2	(0)
2021	Ivory Coast Olympic	4	(0)
2019–	Ivory Coast	30	(3)
Medal record
Representing Ivory Coast
Men's football
Africa Cup of Nations
Winner	2023 Ivory Coast
- * Club domestic league appearances and goals as of 26 October 2026 ‡ National team caps and goals as of 6 September 2024

Christian Michael Kouamé Kouakou (born 6 December 1997) is an Ivorian professional footballer who plays as a forward or winger for Super League Greece club Aris and the Ivory Coast national team.

== Club career ==
Kouamé started playing football on the streets of Bingerville, a suburb of Abidjan, Ivory Coast. At the age of 16, he moved with other Ivorian teenagers to Italy to participate in trials with several clubs. Eventually he was signed by Prato and as still a minor at that time, grew up with an Italian foster family he is still close with.

=== Prato ===
Kouamé made his professional debut in the Lega Pro for Prato on 6 September 2015 in a game against Pisa.

=== Genoa ===
On 13 July 2018, he signed with Genoa for a fee of five million euros. After playing in Serie C and Serie B, he finally discovered Serie A, the top tier of Italian football.

He scored his first goal in his first official match for Genoa, at home against Empoli on 26 August 2018 in Serie A. The match ended in a 2–1 victory for the Rossoblu. He netted his second goal on 10 November 2018, opening the scoring against Napoli, one of the league's strongest sides. However, Napoli ultimately won the match 2–1, in a game made difficult by heavy rain that left the pitch barely playable.

Kouamé emerged as one of the revelations of the 2018–2019 season alongside his teammate Krzysztof Piątek, with whom he formed an effective partnership in a 3–5–2 system, occupying the two forward positions.

In November 2019, Kouamé suffered a serious injury while playing for the Ivory Coast under-23 team, tearing a ligament in his left knee, which sidelined him for several months.

=== Fiorentina ===
In January 2020, Kouamé was announced to be joining Fiorentina on a loan deal until the end of the season, with an obligation to buy. The move was officially completed on 31 January 2020. He made his debut for Fiorentina on 8 July 2020, coming on as a substitute for Dušan Vlahović in a Serie A match against Cagliari Calcio, which ended in a 0–0 draw.

==== Loan to Anderlecht ====
On 21 August 2021, he joined Belgian club Anderlecht on a one-year loan from Fiorentina, with no option to buy.

Kouamé made his first appearance for Anderlecht on 29 August 2021 in a league match against Genk. He came on as a substitute as his team lost 1–0. He made an immediate impact in his second match on 12 September against KV Mechelen, scoring his first two goals for the club in a 7–2 victory. On 30 November 2021, he recorded another brace, this time against RFC Seraing in the Belgian Cup. The match ended in a 3–3 draw before Anderlecht won the ensuing penalty shootout.

==== Loan to Empoli ====
On 3 February 2025, Kouamé was loaned to Empoli until the end of the season, remaining in Serie A. Five days later, he made his debut for the club in a home defeat against AC Milan, coming on as a substitute for Liam Henderson. On 29 March, he scored his first goal for Empoli, securing the 1–1 draw away at Como.

=== Aris ===
On 6 January 2026, Kouamé joined Super League Greece club Aris for an undisclosed fee.

== International career ==
Kouamé debuted for the Ivory Coast U23s in a pair of 2019 Africa U-23 Cup of Nations qualification matches in March 2019. He was called up for the final tournament in November 2019, suffering a knee injury.

He made his debut for the Ivory Coast senior national team on 13 October 2019 in a friendly against DR Congo.

Selected by coach Patrice Beaumelle, Kouamé took part in his first international tournament at the 2021 Africa Cup of Nations in Cameroon, where the Ivory Coast were eliminated in the round of 16 by Egypt in a penalty shoot-out.

Kouamé scored his first goal for the Ivory Coast on 3 June 2022, in a match against Zambia. He started the game and contributed to his team's 3–1 victory.

On 28 December 2023, he was included in the squad of twenty-seven Ivorian players selected by Jean-Louis Gasset to compete in the 2023 Africa Cup of Nations.

== Career statistics ==
=== Club ===
As of match played 27 December 2025

Appearances and goals by club, season and competition
Club	Season	League			National cup (Note: Includes Coppa Italia, Belgian Cup)		Europe		Other		Total	
Club	Season	Division	Apps	Goals	Apps	Goals	Apps	Goals	Apps	Goals	Apps	Goals
Prato	2015–16	Lega Pro	13	0	2	0	—		—		15	0
Cittadella (loan)	2016–17	Serie B	15	2	0	0	—		1	0	16	2
Cittadella	2017–18	Serie B	40	11	4	1	—		3	1	47	13
Cittadella	Cittadella total		55	13	4	1	0	0	4	1	63	15
Genoa	2018–19	Serie A	38	4	1	0	—		—		39	4
Genoa	2019–20	Serie A	11	5	1	0	—		—		12	5
Genoa	Total		49	9	2	0	0	0	0	0	51	9
Fiorentina (loan)	2019–20	Serie A	7	1	0	0	—		—		7	1
Fiorentina	2020–21	Serie A	33	1	3	1	—		—		36	2
Fiorentina	2022–23	Serie A	28	4	3	0	12 (Note: Appearances in UEFA Europa Conference League)	1	—		43	5
Fiorentina	2023–24	Serie A	23	2	3	0	12	0	0	0	38	2
Fiorentina	2024–25	Serie A	18	0	1	0	8 (Note: Appearances in UEFA Conference League)	1	—		27	1
Fiorentina	2025–26	Serie A	2	0	0	0	2	0	—		4	0
Fiorentina	Fiorentina total		111	8	10	1	34	2	0	0	155	11
Anderlecht (loan)	2021–22	Belgian Pro League	31	8	5	5	—		—		36	13
Empoli (loan)	2024–25	Serie A	8	0	1	0	—		—		9	0
Career total			267	38	24	7	34	2	4	1	329	48

=== International ===
Scores and results list Ivory Coast's tally first.

List of international goals scored by Christian Kouamé
No.	Date	Venue	Opponent	Score	Result	Competition
1	3 June 2022	Charles Konan Banny Stadium, Yamoussoukro, Ivory Coast	Zambia	2–0	3–1	2023 Africa Cup of Nations qualification
2	24 March 2023	Stade de la Paix, Bouaké, Ivory Coast	Comoros	1–0	3–1	2023 Africa Cup of Nations qualification
3	20 November 2023	National Stadium, Dar es Salaam, Tanzania	Gambia	1–0	2–0	2026 FIFA World Cup qualification

== Honours ==
Fiorentina

- Coppa Italia runner-up: 2022–23
- UEFA Europa Conference League runner-up: 2022–23, 2023–24

Ivory Coast U23

- Africa U-23 Cup of Nations runner-up: 2019

Ivory Coast

- Africa Cup of Nations: 2023
