= Yahya Nadrani =

French-Moroccan footballer (born 1997)

Personal information
- Date of birth: 14 January 1997 (age 29)
- Place of birth: Saint-Priest-en-Jarez, France
- Height: 1.83 m (6 ft 0 in)
- Position: Centre-back

Youth career
- –2017: Saint-Étienne

Senior career*
| Years | Team | Apps | (Gls) |
| 2015–2017 | Saint-Étienne B | 26 | (0) |
| 2019–2022 | Seraing | 64 | (1) |
| 2022–2023 | AaB | 3 | (0) |
| 2023–2026 | Lusail | 34 | (0) |
- * Club domestic league appearances and goals as of 19 January 2023

Yahya Nadrani (born 14 January 1997) is a French professional footballer who last played as a centre-back.

In November 2022, Nadrani was dropped from AaB's first team after a bust-up with teammate Younes Bakiz. On 19 January 2023, AaB released Nadrani because of the earlier controversy.

== Career statistics ==
=== Club ===
As of 12 May 2021

| Club | Season | League | | | Cup | | Continental | | Other | | Total | |
| Club | Season | Division | Apps | Goals | Apps | Goals | Apps | Goals | Apps | Goals | Apps | Goals |
|---|---|---|---|---|---|---|---|---|---|---|---|---|
| Saint-Étienne B | 2014–15 | Championnat de France Amateur | 5 | 0 | – | | – | | 0 | 0 | 5 | 0 |
| Saint-Étienne B | 2015–16 | Championnat de France Amateur 2 | 6 | 0 | – | | – | | 0 | 0 | 6 | 0 |
| Saint-Étienne B | 2016–17 | Championnat de France Amateur 2 | 15 | 0 | – | | – | | 0 | 0 | 15 | 0 |
| Saint-Étienne B | Total | | 26 | 0 | 0 | 0 | 0 | 0 | 0 | 0 | 26 | 0 |
| RFC Seraing | 2018–19 | First Amateur Division | 12 | 0 | 0 | 0 | – | | 0 | 0 | 12 | 0 |
| RFC Seraing | 2019–20 | First Amateur Division | 1 | 0 | 0 | 0 | – | | 0 | 0 | 1 | 0 |
| RFC Seraing | 2020–21 | Proximus League | 19 | 0 | 1 (Note: Appearances in the Belgian Cup) | 0 | – | | 2 (Note: Appearances in the Proximus League playoffs) | 0 | 22 | 0 |
| RFC Seraing | Total | | 32 | 0 | 1 | 0 | 0 | 0 | 2 | 0 | 35 | 0 |
| Career total | | | 58 | 0 | 1 | 0 | 0 | 0 | 2 | 0 | 61 | 0 |
