= Stade du Pairay =

Football stadium in Seraing, Belgium

Coordinates: 50°36′02″N 5°30′13″E

- Interactive map of Stade du Pairay
- Full name: Stade du Pairay
- Location: Seraing, Belgium
- Capacity: 8,207 (total), 5,000 (seated)

Construction
- Opened: 1906

Tenants
- RFC Seraing (1904) (1906-1996); RFC Liège (1999-2004 & 2008-2015); R.F.C. Seraing (1922) (since 1996) as: * Seraing RUL (1996-2006); * RFC Seraing (2006-2014 and since 2015); * Seraing United (2014-2015)

The Stade du Pairay is a football stadium in Seraing, Belgium. It is the home stadium of RFC Seraing since 1996.
