= Ali Sanogo =

Ivorian footballer (born 1998)

Personal information
- Full name: Ali Sanogo
- Date of birth: 20 October 1998 (age 28)
- Place of birth: Ivory Coast
- Height: 1.78 m (5 ft 10 in)
- Position: Forward

Senior career*
Years	Team	Apps	(Gls)
–2019	SOL FC d'Abobo		
2019–2022	Seraing	31	(7)
2023	ASEC Mimosas		
- * Club domestic league appearances and goals

Ali Sanogo (born 20 October 1998) is an Ivorian professional footballer who plays as a forward.

== Career ==
In January 2023, Sanogo returned to Ivory Coast by signing for ASEC Mimosas, having previously spent three seasons in Belgium with Seraing.
