= 2026 Belgian Cup final =

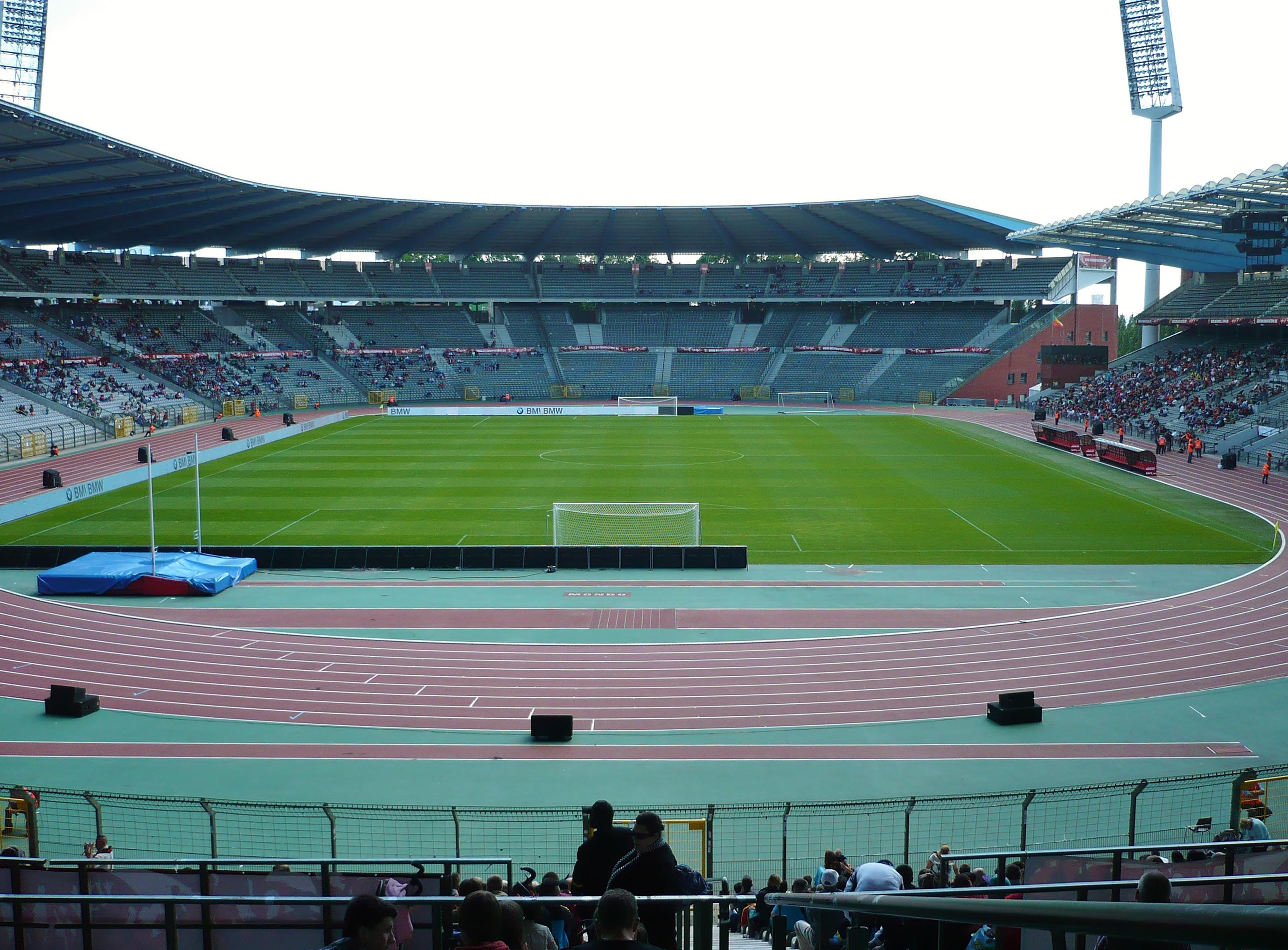
- The King Baudouin Stadium, where the 2026 Belgian Cup final was played.
- Event: 2025–26 Belgian Cup
Union SG	Anderlecht
3	1
- Date: 14 May 2026
- Venue: King Baudouin Stadium, Brussels
- Referee: Bram Van Driessche

The 2026 Belgian Cup final, named Croky Cup after the sponsor, was the 71st Belgian Cup final. It was played on 14 May 2026 between Union SG and Anderlecht.

== Route to the final ==
Union SG				Anderlecht
Opponent	Result	Scorers	Round	Opponent	Result	Scorers
Tubize-Braine (III)	3–0 (A)	Rodríguez (2), David	Seventh round	Ninove (III)	2–0 (H)	Bertaccini, Huerta
Zulte Waregem (I)	2–1 (H)	Rodríguez, David	Eighth round	Genk (I)	3–1 (A)	Bertaccini, Hazard, Kanaté
Dender EH (I)	2–0 (A)	David, Van de Perre	Quarter-finals	Gent (I)	1–0 (H)	Hazard
Charleroi (I)	0–0 (A), 4–1 (H) (4–1 agg.)	none; David, Fuseini, Sykes, Florucz	Semi-finals	Antwerp (I)	0–1 (H), 4–0 (A) (4–1 agg.)	none; Saliba, Degreef, De Cat, Scott (o.g.)

== Pre-match ==
Going into the match, Union SG were the favorites on paper, having won most recent duels between both Brussels-based clubs, and in a battle with Club Brugge to renew their league title, while Anderlecht had been struggling to complete a string of good results and only in fourth. Furthermore, Union SG had already played three cup finals and won each time, most recently winning the 2024 Belgian Cup final, while Anderlecht were now nearly a decade without a major trophy, last winning the title in 2016–17, and the cup in 2008.

On the other hand, Union SG was in a fierce battle for the title, with Club Brugge one point ahead with just three games to go and both teams meeting in Bruges in what could be a title-decing match just three days after the cup final, while Anderlecht was in fourth and could no longer gain positions. For Anderlecht however, European football was not certain yet, while Union SG had already mathematically secured the 2026–27 UEFA Champions League Third qualifying round through their league position. With the winner of the match qualifying for the 2026–27 UEFA Europa League play-off round, this meant that in case Anderlecht wins, their season is effectively over as they cannot improve their league position or European ticket. If Union SG won the cup however, then Anderlecht can at best qualify for the 2026–27 UEFA Europa League Second qualifying round if they hold off both Gent and Mechelen for fourth position, leading over both of those teams by two points with three games to play, although a fifth-place finish might also lead to Europe via the 2025–26 Belgian Pro League European_competition_play-off where a ticket for the 2026–27 UEFA Conference League Second qualifying round can be won.

== Match ==
=== Summary ===
The main highlight of the first half was a disallowed goal in the 16th minute, as Christian Burgess seemed to have opened the score for Union SG, heading in a free kick, however after a lengthy VAR review the goal was disallowed for offside by teammate Kevin Mac Allister, who was judged to have influenced play by causing Mihajlo Cvetković to lose his balance which in turn freed up space for Burgess. Later that half, Anderlecht goalkeeper Colin Coosemans made one more save, and Rob Schoofs had a decent free kick for Union SG, while Anderlecht had no chances whatsoever.

In the second half, both clubs showed very little offensively. Anderlecht had its first shot on goal through Ilay Camara (on Kjell Scherpen), and had more space open up, but both Thorgan Hazard and Yari Verschaeren missed their decisive passes. Fifteen minutes before time Union SG opened the score as Kevin Mac Allister hit a volley from inside the penalty box following a cross by Anan Khalaily, only for Anderlecht to equalize a few minutes later as Cvetković cleanly headed the ball into the top corner, sending the match into extra-time.

After the restart, Union SG finished off the game in just nine minutes as both Mohammed Fuseini and Kevin Rodríguez scored in short succession with Anderlecht having no real answer.

Due to the victory of Union SG and the fact that they were already certain of finishing in the top two and thus entering at least the qualifying rounds of the 2026–27 UEFA Champions League, this meant that Sint-Truiden inherited the 2026–27 UEFA Europa League Play-off round spot (and hence were certain of entering the league phase as they had the backup of the 2026–27 UEFA Conference League).

=== Details ===
14 May 2026
15:00 CEST

Union SG	3−1 (a.e.t.)	Anderlecht
Mac Allister 74'; Fuseini 95'; Rodríguez 100'		Cvetković 82'

King Baudouin Stadium, Brussels
Referee: Bram Van Driessche

Union SG	Anderlecht

GK	37	(Netherlands) Kjell Scherpen
CB	5	(Argentina) Kevin Mac Allister	(yellow card) 80'
CB	16	(England) Christian Burgess (c)
CB	26	(England) Ross Sykes
RM	25	(Israel) Anan Khalaily		(substituted off) 106'
CM	17	(Belgium) Rob Schoofs
CM	8	(Algeria) Adem Zorgane		(substituted off) 111'
LM	11	(Brazil) Guilherme Smith		(substituted off) 91'
AM	23	(Sweden) Besfort Zeneli		(substituted off) 78'
AM	10	(Belgium) Anouar Ait El Hadj		(substituted off) 85'
CF	17	(Germany) Mateo Biondić		(substituted off) 65'
Substitutes:
GK	1	(Belgium) Vic Chambaere
DF	19	(Belgium) Guillaume François
DF	27	(Belgium) Louis Patris		(substituted on) 106'
DF	29	(Senegal) Massiré Sylla
DF	48	(Belgium) Fedde Leysen
MF	6	(Belgium) Kamiel Van de Perre	(yellow card) 104'	(substituted on) 78'
MF	14	(Netherlands) Ivan Pavlić		(substituted on) 111'
FW	7	(Ghana) Mohammed Fuseini	(yellow card) 96'	(substituted on) 85'
FW	13	(Ecuador) Kevin Rodríguez		(substituted on) 65'
FW	20	(Switzerland) Marc Giger
FW	22	(Senegal) Ousseynou Niang		(substituted on) 91'
FW	30	(Austria) Raul Florucz
Manager:
(Belgium) David Hubert

GK	26	(Belgium) Colin Coosemans (c)
RB	7	(Senegal) Ilay Camara		(substituted off) 103'
CB	3	(Denmark) Lucas Hey
CB	93	(Senegal) Moussa Diarra	(yellow card) 90+7'	(substituted off) 103'
LB	79	(Morocco) Ali Maamar	(yellow card) 90+7'
CM	55	(Belgium) Marco Kana		(substituted off) 67'
CM	13	(Canada) Nathan Saliba
RW	9	(Serbia) Mihajlo Cvetković
AM	74	(Belgium) Nathan De Cat	(yellow card) 45+2'	(substituted off) 83'
LW	83	(Belgium) Tristan Degreef		(substituted off) 67'
CF	11	(Belgium) Thorgan Hazard		(substituted off) 89'
Substitutes:
GK	32	(Germany) Justin Heekeren
DF	4	(France) Mathys Angély
DF	6	(Sweden) Ludwig Augustinsson
DF	54	(Belgium) Killian Sardella		(substituted on) 103'
MF	10	(Belgium) Yari Verschaeren		(substituted on) 67'
MF	23	(Belgium) Mats Rits
MF	24	(Netherlands) Enric Llansana
MF	61	(Belgium) Joshua Bethume
FW	14	(Ukraine) Danylo Sikan		(substituted on) 89'
FW	21	(Mexico) César Huerta		(substituted on) 83'
FW	91	(Belgium) Adriano Bertaccini	(yellow card) 90+5'	(substituted on) 67'
FW	99	(Mali) Ibrahim Kanaté		(substituted on) 103'
Manager:
(France) Jérémy Taravel

Match rules

- 90 minutes.
- 30 minutes of extra time if necessary.
- Penalty shoot-out if scores still level.
- Twelve named substitutes.
- Maximum of five substitutions.
- Extra substitute in case of extra time.
