= 2025 Belgian Super Cup =

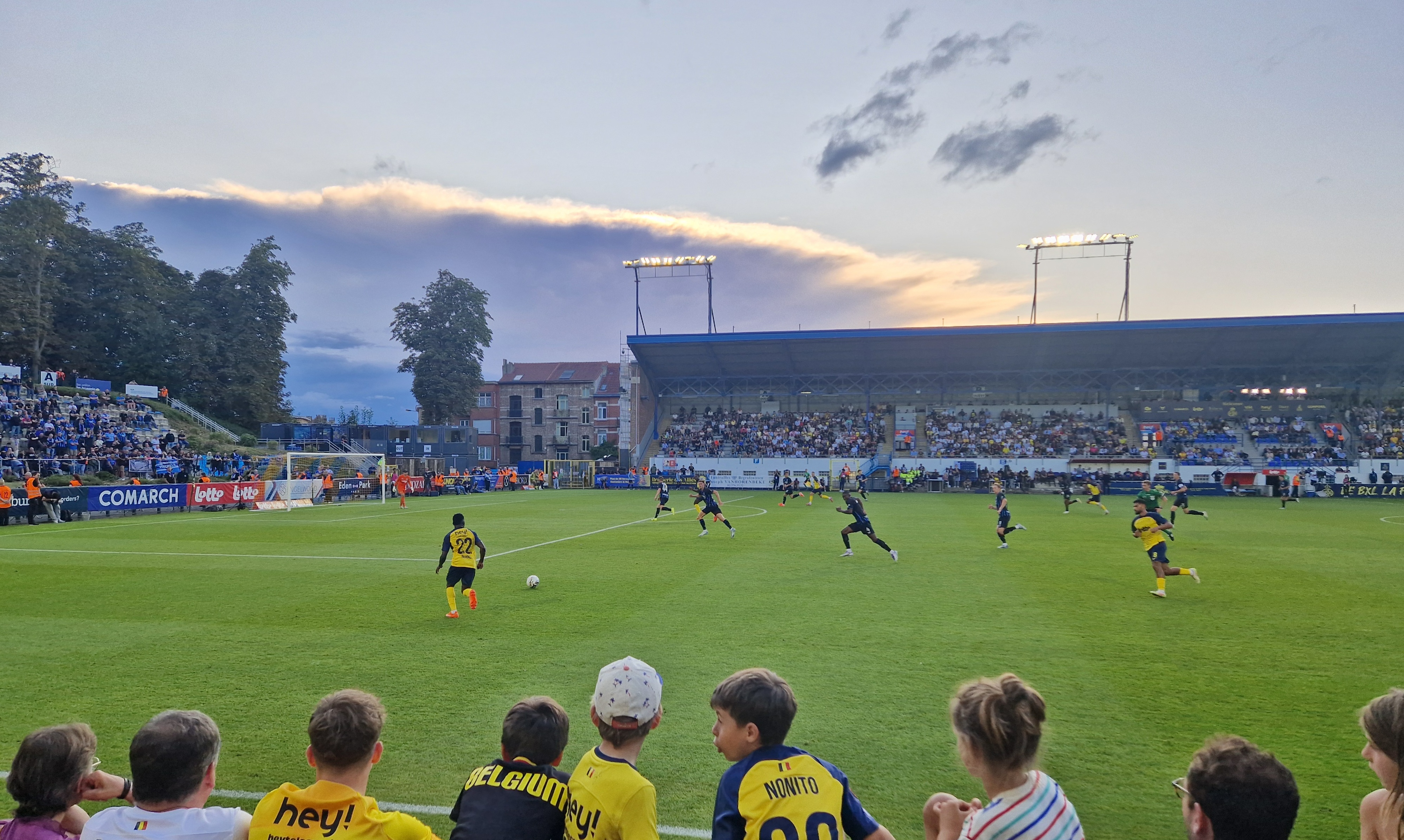
Union SG	Club Brugge
League winners	Cup winners
1	2
- Date: 20 July 2025
- Venue: Joseph Marien Stadium, Forest
- Referee: Lawrence Visser

The 2025 Belgian Super Cup, also known as the Volkswagen Supercup for sponsorship reasons, was a football match that took place on 20 July 2025 between champions of the 2024–25 Belgian Pro League, Union Saint-Gilloise, and Club Brugge, winners of the 2024–25 Belgian Cup. The match was a repeat of the previous edition, now with Union SG hosting instead of Club Brugge. As in 2024, the visiting team came out as winners.

== Match ==
=== Details ===
20 July 2025
18:30 CEST

Union SG	1–2	Club Brugge
Ivanović 15'		Tzolis 31' (pen.); Vanaken 45+1'

Joseph Marien Stadium, Forest
Referee: Lawrence Visser

Union SG	Club Brugge

GK	1	(Belgium) Vic Chambaere
CB	5	(Argentina) Kevin Mac Allister
CB	16	(England) Christian Burgess (c)	(yellow card) 35'
CB	48	(Belgium) Fedde Leysen
RM	21	(Belgium) Alessio Castro-Montes		(substituted off) 62'
CM	22	(Senegal) Ousseynou Niang	(yellow card) 40'
CM	6	(Belgium) Kamiel Van de Perre		(substituted off) 62'
LM	2	(Belgium) Charles Vanhoutte
AM	10	(Belgium) Anouar Ait El Hadj		(substituted off) 62'
CF	13	(Ecuador) Kevin Rodríguez		(substituted off) 77'
CF	9	(Croatia) Franjo Ivanović		(substituted off) 77'
Substitutes:
GK	96	(Belgium) Adriaan Van Etten
GK	99	(Georgia (country)) Giorgi Kavlashvili
DF	3	(Senegal) Mamadou Barry
DF	26	(England) Ross Sykes
MF	4	(Norway) Mathias Rasmussen
MF	11	(Germany) Henok Teklab
MF	23	(Morocco) Sofiane Boufal		(substituted on) 62'
MF	25	(Israel) Anan Khalaily		(substituted on) 62'
MF	98	(Algeria) Adem Zorgane		(substituted on) 62'
FW	12	(Canada) Promise David		(substituted on) 77'
FW	97	(Austria) Raul Florucz		(substituted on) 77'
Manager:
(Belgium) Sébastien Pocognoli

GK	22	(Belgium) Simon Mignolet
RB	58	(Belgium) Jorne Spileers		(substituted off) 87'
CB	4	(Ecuador) Joel Ordóñez	(yellow card) 55'
CB	44	(Belgium) Brandon Mechele
LB	65	(Belgium) Joaquin Seys	(yellow card) 45'	(substituted off) 81'
MF	15	(Nigeria) Raphael Onyedika
MF	6	(Netherlands) Ludovit Reis		(substituted off) 74'
MF	20	(Belgium) Hans Vanaken (c)
RW	10	(Norway) Hugo Vetlesen		(substituted off) 74'
CF	17	(Belgium) Romeo Vermant		(substituted off) 80'
LW	8	(Greece) Christos Tzolis
Substitutes:
GK	16	(Netherlands) Dani van den Heuvel
GK	29	(Belgium) Nordin Jackers
DF	2	(Argentina) Zaid Romero		(substituted on) 87'
DF	14	(Netherlands) Bjorn Meijer		(substituted on) 81'
DF	82	(Belgium) Samuel Gomez Van Hoogen
MF	11	(Belgium) Cisse Sandra		(substituted on) 74'
MF	21	(Poland) Michał Skóraś
MF	62	(Belgium) Lynnt Audoor		(substituted on) 74'
FW	7	(Germany) Nicolò Tresoldi		(substituted on) 80'
FW	84	(South Africa) Shandre Campbell
FW	87	(Belgium) Kaye Furo
Manager:
(Belgium) Nicky Hayen

== See also ==
- 2025–26 Belgian Pro League
- 2025–26 Belgian Cup
