= 2025–26 Royale Union Saint-Gilloise season =

Royale Union Saint-Gilloise
2025–26 season
- Chairman: Alex Muzio
- Manager: Sébastien Pocognoli (until 11 October); David Hubert (since 13 October)
- Stadium: Joseph Marien Stadium
- Belgian Pro League: 2nd
- Belgian Cup: Winners
- Belgian Super Cup: Runners-up
- UEFA Champions League: League phase
- Top goalscorer: League: Promise David; Kevin Rodríguez (9 each); All: Promise David (15)
- Biggest win: 5–0 v OH Leuven
- Biggest defeat: 0–4 v Newcastle United; 0–4 v Inter Milan
Home colours	Away colours	Third colours
- All statistics correct as of 14 May 2026.

The 2025–26 season is Royale Union Saint-Gilloise's 128th season in existence and fifth consecutive in the Belgian Pro League. In addition to the domestic league, they will participate in this season's editions of the Belgian Cup and the Belgian Super Cup. They also competed in the UEFA Champions League, being eliminated in the league phase.

On 11 October 2025, manager Sébastien Pocognoli left the club to join Monaco.

== Players ==
=== First-team squad ===
As of 22 March 2026

No.	Player	Position(s)	Nationality	Place of birth	Date of birth (age)	Signed from	Date signed	Fee	Contract end
Goalkeepers
1	Vic Chambaere	GK	(Belgium)	Roeselare	10 January 2003 (age 23)	(Belgium) Genk	1 July 2024	Free transfer	30 June 2028
21	Jens Teunckens	GK	(Belgium)	Geel	30 January 1998 (age 28)	(Belgium) Lierse	9 October 2025	Free transfer	30 June 2026
37	Kjell Scherpen	GK	(Netherlands)	Emmen	23 January 2000 (age 26)	(England) Brighton	23 July 2025	Undisclosed	30 June 2028
Defenders
3	Mamadou Barry	DF	(Senegal)	Unknown	20 March 2005 (age 21)	(Norway) Tromsø	27 January 2025	Undisclosed	30 June 2029
5	Kevin Mac Allister	DF	(Argentina)	Buenos Aires	7 November 1997 (age 28)	(Argentina) Argentinos Juniors	12 July 2023	€1,500,000	30 June 2026
16	Christian Burgess	DF	(England)	London	7 October 1991 (age 35)	(England) Portsmouth	1 July 2020	Free transfer	30 June 2026
19	Guillaume François	DF	(Belgium)	Libramont-Chevigny	3 June 1990 (age 36)	(Belgium) Virton	9 June 2020	Free transfer	30 June 2026
26	Ross Sykes	DF	(England)	Burnley	26 March 1999 (age 27)	(England) Accrington	1 July 2022	€280,000	30 June 2026
27	Louis Patris	DF	(Belgium)	Gembloux	7 June 2001 (age 25)	(Belgium) STVV	1 September 2025	Undisclosed	30 June 2028
29	Massiré Sylla	DF	(Senegal)	Dakar	7 January 2005 (age 21)	(Norway) Lyn	13 January 2026	Undisclosed	30 June 2030
48	Fedde Leysen	DF	(Belgium)	Geel	9 July 2003 (age 23)	(Netherlands) Jong PSV	1 July 2023	Free transfer	30 June 2029
Midfielders
6	Kamiel Van de Perre	MF	(Belgium)	Turnhout	12 February 2004 (age 22)	(Belgium) Jong Genk	1 July 2024	Free transfer	30 June 2029
8	Adem Zorgane	MF	(Algeria)	Sétif	6 January 2000 (age 26)	(Belgium) Charleroi	12 July 2025	Undisclosed	30 June 2029
10	Anouar Ait El Hadj	MF	(Belgium)	Molenbeek	20 April 2002 (age 24)	(Belgium) Genk	13 July 2024	€1,500,000	30 June 2028
14	Ivan Pavlić	MF	(Netherlands)	Rotterdam	10 November 2001 (age 24)	(Portugal) Paços de Ferreira	3 September 2025	Undisclosed	30 June 2029
17	Rob Schoofs	MF	(Belgium)	Sint-Truiden	23 March 1994 (age 32)	(Belgium) KV Mechelen	1 September 2025	Undisclosed	30 June 2028
22	Ousseynou Niang	MF	(Senegal)	Ziguinchor	12 October 2001 (age 25)	(Latvia) RFS	28 August 2024	Undisclosed	30 June 2027
23	Besfort Zeneli	MF	(Sweden)	Falun	21 November 2002 (age 23)	(Sweden) Elfsborg	13 January 2026	Undisclosed	30 June 2030
Forwards
9	Mateo Biondic	FW	(Germany)	Lemgo	24 July 2003 (age 23)	(Germany) Eintracht Trier	3 January 2026	Undisclosed	30 June 2030
11	Guilherme Smith	FW	(Brazil)	Unknown	11 June 2003 (age 23)	(Estonia) Kalju	12 August 2025	Undisclosed	30 June 2029
12	Promise David	FW	(Canada)	Brampton	3 July 2001 (age 25)	(Estonia) Kalju	2 July 2024	Unknown	30 June 2027
13	Kevin Rodríguez	FW	(Ecuador)	Ibarra	4 March 2000 (age 26)	(Ecuador) Independiente	1 September 2023	€4,500,000	30 June 2027
20	Marc Giger	FW	(Switzerland)	Zurich	27 March 2004 (age 22)	(Switzerland) Schaffhausen	31 January 2025	Undisclosed	30 June 2029
25	Anan Khalaili	FW	(Israel)	Haifa	3 September 2004 (age 22)	(Israel) Maccabi Haifa	1 July 2024	€7,500,000	30 June 2028
30	Raul Florucz	FW	(Austria)	Vienna	10 June 2001 (age 25)	(Slovenia) NK Olimpija	15 July 2025	Undisclosed	30 June 2029
77	Mohammed Fuseini	FW	(Ghana)	Accra	16 May 2002 (age 24)	(Austria) Sturm Graz	2 July 2024	Unknown	30 June 2027

== Transfers ==
=== In ===
Date	Position	Nationality	Player	From	Fee	Ref.
First team
30 June 2025	Forward	(Algeria)	Mohamed Amoura	(Germany) VfL Wolfsburg	Return from loan	
30 June 2025	Midfielder	(Ivory Coast)	Lazare Amani	(Belgium) Standard Liège	Return from loan	
30 June 2025	Forward	(Germany)	Dennis Eckert Ayensa	(Belgium) Standard Liège	Return from loan	
30 June 2025	Forward	(Finland)	Casper Terho	(Germany) Paderborn	Return from loan	
30 June 2025	Midfielder	(Belgium)	Nathan Huygevelde	(Belgium) Kortrijk	Return from loan	
30 June 2025	Forward	(Belgium)	Elton Kabangu	(Scotland) Heart of Midlothian	Return from loan	
1 July 2025 (Note: Promotion confirmed pre-season on 2 June but will take effect at the start of the new season)	Forward	(Equatorial Guinea)	Cristian Makaté	Academy	Promoted to first team	
1 July 2025	Midfielder	(Algeria)	Adem Zorgane	(Belgium) Charleroi	Undisclosed	
15 July 2025	Forward	(Austria)	Raul Florucz	(Slovenia) NK Olimpija	Undisclosed	
23 July 2025	Goalkeeper	(Netherlands)	Kjell Scherpen	(England) Brighton & Hove Albion	Undisclosed	
12 August 2025	Forward	(Brazil)	Guilherme Smith	(Estonia) Kalju	Undisclosed	
1 September 2025	Midfielder	(Belgium)	Rob Schoofs	(Belgium) KV Mechelen	Undisclosed	
2 September 2025	Defender	(Belgium)	Louis Patris	(Belgium) STVV	Undisclosed	
3 September 2025	Midfielder	(Netherlands)	Ivan Pavlić	(Portugal) Paços de Ferreira	Undisclosed	
9 October 2025	Goalkeeper	(Belgium)	Jens Teunckens	(Belgium) Lierse	Free	
3 January 2026	Forward	(Germany)	Mateo Biondic	(Germany) Eintracht Trier	Undisclosed	
13 January 2026	Defender	(Senegal)	Massiré Sylla	(Norway) Lyn	Undisclosed	
13 January 2026	Midfielder	(Sweden)	Besfort Zeneli	(Sweden) Elfsborg	Undisclosed	
B Team
1 July 2025	Defender	(Belgium)	Noah Stassin	(Belgium) Tubize-Braine	Undisclosed	

=== Out ===
Date	Position	Nationality	Player	To	Fee	Ref.
1 July 2025	Forward	(Algeria)	Mohamed Amoura	(Germany) VfL Wolfsburg	€15,000,000	
1 July 2025	Forward	(Germany)	Dennis Eckert Ayensa	(Belgium) Standard Liège	€1,000,000	
1 July 2025 (Note: This was announced on 28 May 2025 but will become official when the transfer window opens)	Forward	(Belgium)	Elton Kabangu	(Scotland) Heart of Midlothian	Undisclosed	
1 July 2025	Defender	(Japan)	Koki Machida	(Germany) Hoffenheim	Undisclosed	
3 July 2025	Midfielder	(Finland)	Casper Terho	(Belgium) OH Leuven	Undisclosed	
3 July 2025	Midfielder	(Democratic Republic of the Congo)	Noah Sadiki	(England) Sunderland	Undisclosed	
16 July 2025	Goalkeeper	(Luxembourg)	Anthony Moris	(Saudi Arabia) Al-Khaleej	Undisclosed	
31 July 2025	Forward	(Croatia)	Franjo Ivanović	(Portugal) Benfica	Undisclosed	
1 September 2025	Defender	(Belgium)	Alessio Castro-Montes	(Germany) FC Köln	Undisclosed	
1 September 2025	Midfielder	(Belgium)	Charles Vanhoutte	(France) OGC Nice	Undisclosed	
5 September 2025	Forward	(Germany)	Henok Teklab	(Belgium) OH Leuven	Undisclosed	
24 January 2026	Midfielder	(Norway)	Mathias Rasmussen	(Germany) FC St. Pauli	Undisclosed	

=== Loaned In ===
Date	Position	Nationality	Player	From	Fee	Ref.

=== Loaned Out ===
Date	Position	Nationality	Player	To	Ref.
28 January 2026	Forward	(Equatorial Guinea)	Cristian Makaté	(Belgium) La Louvière	

=== Out of contract ===
Date	No.	Pos.	Player	Subsequent club	Join date	Notes	Ref.
30 June 2025	8	MF	(Ivory Coast) Lazare Amani	(Greece) A.E. Kifisia	18 September 2025	End of contract	
30 June 2025	14	GK	(Sweden) Joachim Imbrechts	(Belgium) RSCA Futures	30 July 2025	End of contract	
30 June 2025	85	DF	(Belgium) Arnaud Dony	(Belgium) Patro Eisden	20 June 2025	End of contract	
5 January 2026	23	MF	(Morocco) Sofiane Boufal	(France) Le Havre	14 January 2026	Mutual agreement	

== New contracts ==
=== First team ===
Date	Pos.	Player	Contract length	Ref.
2 June 2025	FW	Cristian Makaté	4 years	
1 July 2025	DF	Christian Burgess	1 year (Option triggered)	
1 July 2025	DF	Guillaume François	1 year	
14 July 2025	MF	Kamiel Van de Perre	4 years	

== Pre-season and friendlies ==
Win Draw Loss Fixtures

1 July 2025	Union Rochefortoise	1–3	Union Saint-Gilloise	Nijlen, Belgium
19:00 CEST

5 July 2025	PSV	1–0	Union Saint-Gilloise	Eindhoven, Netherlands
--:-- CEST				Attendance: 0
Note: This fixture will be a closed doors fixture.

12 July 2025	Feyenoord	1–1	Union Saint-Gilloise	Rotterdam, Netherlands
14:00 CEST	Bullaude 72'		Boufal 31' (pen.)	Stadium: De Kuip
Note: Kick-off time is provisional. Fans will be permitted.

16 July 2025	Paris F.C.	0–1	Union Saint-Gilloise	Paris, France
19:00 CEST			Ait El Hadj 54'

== Competitions ==
=== Overall record ===
Competition	First match	Last match	Starting round	Final position	Record							
Competition	First match	Last match	Starting round	Final position	Pld	W	D	L	GF	GA	GD	Win %
Belgian Pro League	25 July 2025	22 March 2026	Matchday 1	1st	30	19	9	2	50	17	+33	63.33
Belgian Pro League Champions' play-offs	4 April 2026	24 May 2026	1st	2nd	10	6	2	2	16	10	+6	60.00
Super Cup	20 July 2025		Final	Runners-up	1	0	0	1	1	2	−1	0.00
Belgian Cup	29 October 2025	14 May 2026	Seventh round	Winners	6	5	1	0	14	3	+11	83.33
UEFA Champions League	16 September 2025	28 January 2026	League phase	27th place	8	3	0	5	8	17	−9	37.50
Total					55	33	12	10	89	49	+40	60.00

Source: Competitions

=== Belgian Pro League ===
==== League table ====
Pos	Team	Pld	W	D	L	GF	GA	GD	Pts	Qualification or relegation
1	Union SG	30	19	9	2	50	17	+33	66	Qualification for the Europa League and Champions' play-offs (Note: The regular season winners will qualify for the 2026–27 UEFA Europa League if not earning a 2026–27 UEFA Champions League place in the playoff.)
2	Club Brugge	30	20	3	7	59	36	+23	63	Qualification for the Champions' play-offs
3	Sint-Truiden	30	18	3	9	47	35	+12	57	Qualification for the Champions' play-offs
4	Gent	30	13	6	11	49	43	+6	45	Qualification for the Champions' play-offs
5	Mechelen	30	12	9	9	39	37	+2	45	Qualification for the Champions' play-offs

Source: Jupiler Pro League (in Dutch)
Rules for classification: 1) Points; 2) Matches won; 3) Goal difference; 4) Goals scored; 5) Away matches won; 6) Away goal difference; 7) Away goals scored; 8) Play-off.

==== Results summary ====
Overall								Home						Away					
Pld	W	D	L	GF	GA	GD	Pts	W	D	L	GF	GA	GD	W	D	L	GF	GA	GD
30	19	9	2	50	17	+33	66	14	1	0	29	5	+24	5	8	2	21	12	+9

Source: Competitions

==== Results by round ====
Round	1	2	3	4	5	6	7	8	9	10	11	12	13	14	15	16	17	18	19	20	21	22	23	24	25	26	27	28	29	30
Ground	A	H	A	H	A	H	A	A	H	A	H	H	A	A	H	A	H	A	H	A	H	A	H	H	A	H	D	W	W	W
Result	D	W	W	W	D	W	W	W	W	L	W	W	W	D	W	L	D	D	W	D	W	D	W	W	D	W	D	W	W	W
Position	8	2	1	1	2	1	1	1	1	1	1	1	1	1	1	1	1	1	1	1	1	1	1	1	1	1	1	1	1	1
Points	1	4	7	10	11	14	17	20	23	23	26	29	32	33	36	36	37	38	41	42	45	46	49	52	53	56	57	60	63	66

A = Away; H = Home; W = Win; D = Draw; L = Loss

==== Matches ====
Win Draw Loss Fixtures

25 July 2025 1	Antwerp	1–1	Union Saint-Gilloise	Antwerp
20:45 CEST	Janssen (yellow card) 18' (goal) 36'; Doumbia (yellow card) 26'; Kerk (yellow card) 77'		Niang (yellow card) 45+2'; Leysen (yellow card) 57'; Vanhoutte (yellow card) 67'; Florucz 68'	Stadium: Bosuilstadion; Attendance: 12,398; Referee: Erik Lambrechts

3 August 2025 2	Union Saint-Gilloise	5–0	OH Leuven	Brussels
18:30 CEST	Khalaili 1'; Sykes 4'; Florucz 48' (pen.), 59'; Niang 71'; Giger (yellow card) 84'		Schrijvers (yellow card) 66'; Traoré (yellow card) 79'	Stadium: Joseph Marien Stadium; Attendance: 7,281; Referee: Jan Boterberg

9 August 2025 3	Gent	2–3	Union Saint-Gilloise	Ghent
20:45 CEST	Goore 81'; Samoise (yellow card) 85'; Paskotsi 90+5'		Leysen 27'; Khalaili (yellow card) 38'; Rodríguez 51'; Zorgane 73' (yellow card) 90+5'; Sykes (yellow card) 85'; Burgess (yellow card) 86'	Stadium: Ghelamco Arena

16 August 2025 4	Union Saint-Gilloise	3–0	Standard Liège	Brussels
20:45 CEST	Rodríguez 27', 61'; Niang (yellow card) 69'; David 84'		Henry (yellow card) 18' (yellow-red card) 25'	Stadium: Joseph Marien Stadium; Referee: Bram Van Driessche

24 August 2025 5	La Louvière	0–0	Union Saint-Gilloise	La Louvière
18:30 CEST	Liongola (yellow card) 8'; Maës (yellow card) 29'		Rodríguez (yellow card) 33'; Niang (yellow card) 71'; Vanhoutte (yellow card) 82'	Stadium: Easi Arena; Referee: Nathan Verboomen

31 August 2025 6	Union Saint-Gilloise	2–0	Anderlecht	Brussels
18:30 CEST	Florucz 4' (pen.); Rasmussen (yellow card) 86'; David 90+1'		Huerta (yellow card) 38'; Saliba (yellow card) 51' (yellow-red card) 81'; Angulo (yellow card) 52' (yellow-red card) 83'; Hazard (yellow card) 72'	Stadium: Joseph Marien Stadium

13 September 2025 7	Dender	0–1	Union Saint-Gilloise	Denderleeuw
18:45 CEST			Rodríguez 87'	Stadium: Dender Football Complex; Referee: Bert Verbeke

21 September 2025 8	Genk	1–2	Union Saint-Gilloise	Genk
13:30 CEST	Ito 56'; El Ouahdi (yellow card) 27'; Kayembe (yellow card) 90+1'		David 10'; Leysen (yellow card) 44'; Niang (yellow card) 46'; Mac Allister (yellow card) 59'; Van de Perre (yellow card) 90'; Schoofs 90+4'	Stadium: Cegeka Arena; Referee: Nathan Verboomen

27 September 2025 9	Union Saint-Gilloise	2–0	Westerlo	Brussels
20:45 CEST	Schoofs (yellow card) 56'; David 63' (yellow card) 64'; Giger 78'; Van de Perre (yellow card) 90+1'		Jungdal (yellow card) 63'; Sayyadmanesh (yellow card) 77'	Stadium: Joseph Marien Stadium

5 October 2025 10	Club Brugge	1–0	Union Saint-Gilloise	Bruges
18:30 CEST	Ordóñez (yellow card) 29'; Forbs 77'; Tresoldi (yellow card) 90+6'		Mac Allister (yellow card) 5'; Khalaili (yellow card) 44'; Giger (yellow card) 90+2'	Stadium: Jan Breydel Stadium

18 October 2025 11	Union Saint-Gilloise	3–1	Charleroi	Brussels
18:45 CEST	Florucz 16'; Niang 48'; Rasmussen 74'		Nzita (yellow card) 11'; Ousou (yellow card) 18' (goal) 45+2'; Guiagon (yellow card) 58'	Stadium: Joseph Marien Stadium

26 October 2025 12	Union Saint-Gilloise	2–0	STVV	Brussels
19:15 CET	Rodríguez 64'; Ait El Hadj (yellow card) 78'; Rodríguez 90+1'		Sebaoui (yellow card) 13'; Sissako (yellow card) 25'	Stadium: Joseph Marien Stadium

1 November 2025 13	Zulte Waregem	1–4	Union Saint-Gilloise	Waregem
16:00 CET	Nnadi (yellow card) 38'; Erenbjerg 60' (pen.)		Rodríguez 38'; Burgess (yellow card) 43'; Van de Perre (yellow card) 44'; Giger 45+2', 46'; Sykes (yellow card) 73'; Zorgane (yellow card) 81'; David 90+2'	Stadium: Regenboogstadion

9 November 2025 14	KV Mechelen	1–1	Union Saint-Gilloise	Mechelen
19:15 CET	Koudou (yellow card) 6'; Marsà (yellow card) 55'; van Brederode 90+3' (pen.) (yellow card) 90+6'		Niang (yellow card) 45+3'; Khalaili (yellow card) 68'; Florucz 85'	Stadium: Achter de Kazerne

22 November 2025 15	Union Saint-Gilloise	2–0	Cercle Brugge	Brussels
16:00 CET	Patris (yellow card) 27'; David 41'; Schoofs (yellow card) 67'; Florucz 78'		Ravych (yellow card) 4'; Utkus (yellow card) 20'; Van der Bruggen (yellow card) 38'; Nazinho (yellow card) 60'	Stadium: Joseph Marien Stadium

30 November 2025 16	Anderlecht	1–0	Union Saint-Gilloise	Brussels
18:30 CET	Angulo 11'; De Cat (yellow card) 29'; Hazard (yellow card) 74'		Van de Perre (yellow card) 9'; Ait El Hadj (yellow card) 25'; Khalaili (yellow card) 69'; Burgess (yellow card) 90+6'	Stadium: Lotto Park

6 December 2025 17	Union Saint-Gilloise	1–1	Gent	Brussels
18:15 CET	Mac Allister (yellow card) 70' (goal) 77'		Samoise 4'; Kanga (yellow card) 86'	Stadium: Joseph Marien Stadium; Attendance: 6,373; Referee: Simon Bourdeaud'Hui

14 December 2025 18	Charleroi	1–1	Union Saint-Gilloise	Charleroi
18:30 CET	Colassin 81'; Bernier (yellow card) 84'		David 39'; Mac Allister (yellow card) 48'; Sykes (yellow card) 90+3'	Stadium: Stade du Pays de Charleroi; Attendance: 7,425; Referee: Lawrence Visser

20 December 2025 19	Union Saint-Gilloise	2–0	Zulte Waregem	Brussels
20:45 CET	David 39'; Khalaili 75'; Burgess (yellow card) 79'		Lofolomo (yellow card) 15'; Lemoine (yellow card) 90+5'	Stadium: Joseph Marien Stadium; Attendance: 6,295; Referee: Nathan Verboomen

26 December 2025 20	Cercle Brugge	1–1	Union Saint-Gilloise	Bruges
16:00 CET	Magnée 43' (pen.); Van der Bruggen (yellow card) 45'; Diaby (yellow card) 59' (yellow-red card) 75'		Rasmussen 17'; Smith (yellow card) 32'; Sykes (yellow card) 45'; Burgess (yellow card) 74' (yellow-red card) 87'	Stadium: Jan Breydel Stadium; Attendance: 5,406; Referee: Lothar D'Hondt

17 January 2026 21	Union Saint-Gilloise	1–0	KV Mechelen	Brussels
20:45 CET	David 35'; Mac Allister (yellow card) 45'; Sykes (yellow card) 76'; Khalaili (yellow card) 90+2'; Scherpen (yellow card) 90+2'		Kireev (yellow card) 31'; Halhal (yellow card) 83'	Stadium: Joseph Marien Stadium; Attendance: 8,000; Referee: Bram Van Driessche

24 January 2026 22	OH Leuven	0–0	Union Saint-Gilloise	Leuven
20:45 CET	Óscar Gil (yellow card) 7'; Dussenne (yellow card) 46'; Kaba (yellow card) 90+5'		Van de Perre (yellow card) 69'; Burgess (yellow card) 85'	Stadium: Den Dreef; Attendance: 7,323

1 February 2026 23	Union Saint-Gilloise	1–0	Club Brugge	Brussels
18:30 CET	Zorgane 31' (yellow card) 72'; Sykes (yellow card) 40'; Burgess (yellow card) 90+1'		Diakhon (yellow card) 8'; Mechele (yellow card) 61'; Mignolet (yellow card) 90+4'	Stadium: Joseph Marien Stadium; Attendance: 9,000; Referee: Nathan Verboomen

8 February 2026 24	Union Saint-Gilloise	2–1	La Louvière	Brussels
16:00 CET	Schoofs 45+1'; Smith 82' (yellow card) 83'; Patris (yellow card) 54'; Mac Allister (yellow card) 90'; Van de Perre (yellow card) 90+3'		Afriyie 5' (yellow card) 70'; Fall (yellow card) 82'; Liongola (yellow card) 90'; Ashimeru (yellow card) 90+5'	Stadium: Joseph Marien Stadium; Attendance: 6,805; Referee: Nicolas Laforge

14 February 2026 25	Standard Liège	1–1	Union Saint-Gilloise	Liège
20:45 CET	Eckert 15' (yellow card) 72'; Homawoo (yellow card) 38'; Saïd (yellow card) 45+4'; Lawrence (yellow card) 52'		Smith 76'; Van de Perre (yellow card) 62'; Zorgane (yellow card) 72'; Burgess (yellow card) 80'; Mac Allister (yellow card) 87'	Stadium: Stade Maurice Dufrasne; Attendance: 16,241; Referee: Lawrence Visser

21 February 2026 26	Union Saint-Gilloise	2–1	Antwerp	Brussels
20:45 CET	Van Den Bosch 44' (o.g.); Sykes 90+1'; Chambaere (yellow card) 69'; Mac Allister (yellow card) 90+8'		Valencia 51'; Kouyaté (yellow card) 7'; Foulon (yellow card) 90+9'	Stadium: Joseph Marien Stadium; Attendance: 6,344; Referee: Bram Van Driessche

1 March 2026 27	Westerlo	0–0	Union Saint-Gilloise	Westerlo
18:30 CET	Nsiala (yellow card) 29' (red card); Ferri (yellow card) 90+4'		Schoofs (yellow card) 35'; Mac Allister (yellow card) 52'; Burgess (yellow card) 90+1'	Stadium: Het Kuipje

7 March 2026 28	Union Saint-Gilloise	2–1	Genk	Brussels
20:45 CET	Burgess 15' (yellow card) 66'; Zeneli 52'; Van de Perre (yellow card) 47'; Smith (yellow card) 56'		Heymans 68' (pen.); Karetsas (yellow card) 35'; Kayembe (yellow card) 69'	Stadium: Joseph Marien Stadium

14 March 2026 29	Union Saint-Gilloise	2–0	Dender	Brussels
18:15 CET	Biondic 59'; Rodríguez 80'		Sambu Mansoni (yellow card) 78'	Stadium: Joseph Marien Stadium

22 March 2026 30	STVV	1–3	Union Saint-Gilloise	Sint-Truiden
18:30 CET	Diouf 79'	Report	Burgess 23'; Sykes 27'; Zeneli 56'	Stadium: Stayen; Attendance: 10,176; Referee: Jasper Vergoote

==== Champions' play-offs ====
===== League table =====
Pos	Team	Pld	W	D	L	GF	GA	GD	Pts	Qualification or relegation
1	Club Brugge (C)	10	8	1	1	32	9	+23	57	Qualification for the Champions League league phase
2	Union SG	10	6	2	2	16	10	+6	53	Qualification for the Champions League third qualifying round
3	Sint-Truiden	10	4	2	4	14	11	+3	43	Qualification for the Europa League play-off round (Note: Union SG won the 2025–26 Belgian Cup and qualified for the Champions League through finishing in the top two, the Europa League play-off round berth was therefore transferred to Sint-Truiden.)
4	Anderlecht	10	3	2	5	16	23	−7	33	Qualification for the Europa League second qualifying round

Source: Jupiler Pro League (in Dutch), Soccerway
Rules for classification: 1) Points; 2) Points without (possible) half points added due to rounding; 3) Regular season finishing position.
(C) Champions

===== Results summary =====
Overall								Home						Away					
Pld	W	D	L	GF	GA	GD	Pts	W	D	L	GF	GA	GD	W	D	L	GF	GA	GD
10	6	2	2	16	10	+6	20	4	1	0	11	2	+9	2	1	2	5	8	−3

Source: Competitions

===== Results by round =====
Round	1	2	3	4	5	6	7	8	9	10
Ground	H	A	H	H	A	A	H	A	A	H
Result	W	W	W	D	W	L	W	L	D	W
Position	1	1	1	1	1	2	2	2	2	2
Points	36	39	42	43	46	46	49	49	50	53

Updated to match(es) played on 12 April 2026. Source: Competitions
A = Away; H = Home; W = Win; D = Draw; L = Loss

===== Matches =====
Win Draw Loss Fixtures

4 April 2026 1	Union Saint-Gilloise	1–0	STVV	Brussels
20:45 CEST	Smith 63'; Mac Allister (yellow card) 70'; Zorgane (yellow card) 88'; Burgess (yellow card) 90+6'		Vanwesemael (yellow card) 64'	Stadium: Joseph Marien Stadium

12 April 2026 2	Mechelen	0–1	Union Saint-Gilloise	Mechelen
13:30 CEST	Servais (yellow card) 82'		Sykes 45+2'; Burgess (yellow card) 54'; Khalaili (yellow card) 90+1'; Florucz (yellow card) 90+4'; Pavlić (yellow card) 90+6'	Stadium: Achter de Kazerne

19 April 2026 3	Union Saint-Gilloise	2–1	Club Brugge	Brussels
	Sykes (yellow card) 13'; Zorgane (yellow card) 14'; Biondic 29'; Khalaili (yellow card) 45+1'; Zeneli 81'	Report	Vetlesen (yellow card) 14'; Mechele 15'; Forbs (yellow card) 25'; Vermant (yellow card) 33'; Ordóñez (yellow card) 55'; Stanković (yellow card) 90+5'	Stadium: Joseph Marien Stadium; Attendance: 7,858; Referee: Lawrence Visser

22 April 2026 4	Union Saint-Gilloise	0–0	Gent	Brussels
20:30 CEST		Report		Stadium: Joseph Marien Stadium; Attendance: Joseph Marien Stadium; Referee: Lothar D'Hondt

26 April 2026 5	Anderlecht	1–3	Union Saint-Gilloise	Constant Vanden Stock Stadium
	Cvetković 32'; Sardella (red card) 45+7'	Report	Zorgane 17', 25'; Smith 65'	Attendance: 16,458; Referee: Jasper Vergoote

2 May 2026 6	STVV	2–1	Union Saint-Gilloise	Stayen
	Diouf 86'; Itō 90+10'	Report	Mac Allister (red card) 12'; Rodríguez 90+2'	Referee: Jan Boterberg

10 May 2026 7	Union Saint-Gilloise	3–0	Mechelen	Brussels
18:30 CEST	Biondic 11'; El Hadj 61'; Fuseini 90+1'	Report		Stadium: Joseph Marien Stadium; Referee: Erik Lambrechts

17 May 2026 8	Club Brugge	5–0	Union Saint-Gilloise	Brugge
18:30 CEST	Vanaken 31', 45+1'; Seys 38'; Tzolis 87'; Forbs 90+5'	Report		Stadium: Jan Breydel Stadium; Referee: Lothar D'Hondt

21 May 2026 9	Gent	0–0	Union Saint-Gilloise	Ghent
13:30 CEST				Stadium: Planet Group Arena; Attendance: 10,823; Referee: Jasper Vergoote

24 May 2026 10	Union Saint-Gilloise	5–1	Anderlecht	Brussels
18:30 CEST	Biondic 18'; Rodríguez 21'; Ait El Hadj 32'; Khalaili 42'; Sykes 59'		Hazard (red card) 47'; Kanaté 75'	Stadium: Joseph Marien Stadium; Attendance: 8,289; Referee: Lawrence Visser

=== Belgian Cup ===
Win Draw Loss Fixtures

29 October 2025 Seventh round	Tubize-Braine	0–3	Union Saint-Gilloise	Tubize
20:30 CET	Tepe (yellow card) 26'; Delhaye (yellow card) 43' (yellow-red card) 76'; Kuchinska (yellow card) 50'		Rodríguez 47', 67'; Boufal (yellow card) 70'; David 90+3'	Stadium: Stade Leburton

3 December 2025 Eighth round	Union Saint-Gilloise	2–1	Zulte Waregem	Brussels
20:30 CET	Rodríguez 73'; David 82'		Ujka 14'	Stadium: Joseph Marien Stadium; Attendance: 6,821; Referee: Bert Verbeke

14 January 2026 Quarter-final	Dender EH	0–2	Union Saint-Gilloise	Denderleeuw
20:30 CET			David 20'; Van de Perre 40'	Stadium: Dender Football Complex

4 February 2026 Semi-final first leg	Charleroi	0–0	Union Saint-Gilloise	Charleroi
20:30 CET	Etienne Camara (yellow card) 89'		Sykes (yellow card) 37'	Stadium: Stade du Pays de Charleroi

11 February 2026 Semi-final second leg	Union Saint-Gilloise	4–1 (4–1 agg.)	Charleroi	Brussels
20:30 CET	David 1'; Fuseini 50'; Sykes 84'; Florucz 90+3'; Mac Allister (yellow card) 19'; Khalaili (yellow card) 90+2'	Report	Scheidler 3'; Titraoui (yellow card) 27' (yellow-red card) 72'; Boukamir (yellow card) 57'; Blum (yellow card) 80'	Stadium: Joseph Marien Stadium

14 May 2026 Final	Union Saint-Gilloise	3−1 (a.e.t.)	Anderlecht	King Baudouin Stadium, Brussels
15:00 CEST	Mac Allister 74'; Fuseini 95'; Rodríguez 100'		Cvetković 82'	Referee: Bram Van Driessche

=== Belgian Super Cup ===
Win Draw Loss Fixtures

20 July 2025 Final	Union Saint-Gilloise	1–2	Club Brugge	Brussels
18:30 CEST	Ivanović 15'; Burgess (yellow card) 35'; Niang (yellow card) 40'		Tzolis 31' (pen.)40; Seys (yellow card) 45'; Vanaken 45+1'; Ordóñez (yellow card) 55'	Stadium: Joseph Marien Stadium; Referee: Lawrence Visser

=== UEFA Champions League ===
Due to their home venue, the Joseph Marien Stadium, not meeting UEFA requirements, Union Saint-Gilloise will play their European home games at Lotto Park in Anderlecht.

==== League phase ====
Pos	Team	Pld	W	D	L	GF	GA	GD	Pts
25	(French Football Federation) Marseille	8	3	0	5	11	14	−3	9
26	(Cyprus Football Association) Pafos	8	2	3	3	8	11	−3	9
27	(Royal Belgian Football Association) Union Saint-Gilloise	8	3	0	5	8	17	−9	9
28	(Royal Dutch Football Association) PSV Eindhoven	8	2	2	4	16	16	0	8
29	(Royal Spanish Football Federation) Athletic Bilbao	8	2	2	4	9	14	−5	8

Source: UEFA
Rules for classification: League phase tiebreakers

Win Draw Loss Fixtures

16 September 2025 1	PSV (Netherlands)	1–3	(Belgium) Union Saint-Gilloise	Eindhoven, Netherlands
18:45	Van Bommel 90'		David 9' (pen.); Ait El Hadj 39'; Mac Allister 81'	Stadium: Philips Stadion

1 October 2025 2	Union Saint-Gilloise (Belgium)	0–4	(England) Newcastle United	Brussels, Belgium
18:45	Van de Perre (yellow card) 39'; Burgess (yellow card) 51'; Mac Allister (yellow card) 57'; Giger (yellow card) 60'		Joelinton (yellow card) 35'; Woltemade 17'; Gordon 43' (pen.), 64' (pen.); Barnes 80'	Stadium: Lotto Park

21 October 2025 3	Union Saint-Gilloise (Belgium)	0–4	(Italy) Inter Milan	Brussels, Belgium
21:00	Schoofs (yellow card) 88'		De Vrij (yellow card) 31'; Dumfries 41'; L. Martínez 45+1'; Çalhanoğlu 53' (pen.); Esposito 76'	Stadium: Lotto Park; Attendance: 16,632; Referee: Glenn Nyberg (Sweden)

4 November 2025 4	Atlético Madrid (Spain)	3–1	(Belgium) Union Saint-Gilloise	Madrid, Spain
21:00	Álvarez 39'; Molina (yellow card) 68'; Gallagher 72'; Llorente 90+6'		Van de Perre (yellow card) 45'; Niang (yellow card) 66'; Sykes 80'; Mac Allister (yellow card) 81'	Stadium: Metropolitano Stadium

25 November 2025 5	Galatasaray (Turkey)	0–1	(Belgium) Union Saint-Gilloise	Istanbul, Turkey
18:45	Gündoğan (yellow card) 13'; Torreira (yellow card) 63'; Sánchez (yellow card) 64'; Ünyay (yellow card) 80' (yellow-red card) 89'		David (yellow card) 36' (goal) 57'; Khalaili (yellow card) 63'	Stadium: Rams Park

9 December 2025 6	Union Saint-Gilloise (Belgium)	2–3	(France) Marseille	Brussels, Belgium
21:00	Khalaili 5', 71'; Burgess (yellow card) 59'; Zorgane (yellow card) 68'; Niang (yellow card) 80'; David (yellow card) 90'		Paixão 15'; Weah (yellow card) 28'; Greenwood 41', 58'	Stadium: Lotto Park; Referee: João Pinheiro (Portugal)

21 January 2026 7	Bayern Munich (Germany)	2–0	(Belgium) Union Saint-Gilloise	Munich, Germany
21:00	Kane 52', 55' (pen.)	Report	David (yellow card) 66'	Stadium: Allianz Arena; Attendance: 66,000; Referee: Rade Obrenović (Slovenia)

28 January 2026 8	Union Saint-Gilloise (Belgium)	1–0	(Italy) Atalanta	Brussels, Belgium
21:00	Khalaili 70'; Burgess (yellow card) 10'; Sykes (yellow card) 77'	Report	Samardžić (yellow card) 28'; Ahanor (yellow card) 69'; Scamacca (yellow card) 90+3'	Stadium: Lotto Park; Attendance: 15,010; Referee: Michael Oliver (England)
Note: The match was played at Constant Vanden Stock Stadium in Brussels, instead of Union Saint-Gilloise's regular stadium, Joseph Marien Stadium, which did not meet UEFA requirements.

== Statistics ==
As of 26 April 2026

=== Appearances and goals ===
Includes all competitive matches. The list is sorted by squad number. Players who left the club prior to the first competitive fixture of the season or who have not made any appearances are not featured.

No.	Pos	Nat	Player	Total		Belgian Pro League (Note: Includes games from regular season and playoffs)		Belgian Cup		UEFA Champions League		Super Cup	
No.	Pos	Nat	Player	Apps	Goals	Apps	Goals	Apps	Goals	Apps	Goals	Apps	Goals
Goalkeepers
1	GK	(Belgium) BEL	Vic Chambaere	14	0	8+1	0	2+1	0	0+1	0	1+0	0
37	GK	(Netherlands) NED	Kjell Scherpen	35	0	24+0	0	3+0	0	8+0	0	0+0	0
Defenders
3	DF	(Senegal) SEN	Mamadou Barry	4	0	1+1	0	2+0	0	0+0	0	0+0	0
5	DF	(Argentina) ARG	Kevin Mac Allister	44	2	33+0	1	3+0	0	7+0	1	1+0	0
16	DF	(England) ENG	Christian Burgess	42	4	31+0	4	3+0	0	7+0	0	1+0	0
19	DF	(Belgium) BEL	Guillaume François	2	0	0+1	0	0+1	0	0+0	0	0+0	0
26	DF	(England) ENG	Ross Sykes	40	5	27+4	3	2+2	1	3+2	1	0+0	0
27	DF	(Belgium) BEL	Louis Patris	34	0	7+17	0	1+4	0	0+5	0	0+0	0
29	DF	(Senegal) SEN	Massiré Sylla	1	0	0+1	0	0	0	0	0	0+0	0
48	DF	(Belgium) BEL	Fedde Leysen	33	1	17+5	1	1+3	0	3+3	0	1+0	0
Midfielders
6	MF	(Belgium) BEL	Kamiel Van de Perre	40	1	23+6	0	2+1	1	6+1	0	1+0	0
8	MF	(Algeria) ALG	Adem Zorgane	46	4	31+3	4	3+1	0	7+0	0	0+1	0
10	MF	(Belgium) BEL	Anouar Ait El Hadj	42	1	28+4	0	2+1	0	6+0	1	1+0	0
14	MF	(Netherlands) NED	Ivan Pavlić	6	0	0+6	0	0+0	0	0+0	0	0+0	0
17	MF	(Belgium) BEL	Rob Schoofs	33	2	13+11	2	1+3	0	2+3	0	0+0	0
22	MF	(Senegal) SEN	Ousseynou Niang	31	2	17+6	2	0+1	0	5+1	0	1+0	0
23	MF	(Sweden) SWE	Besfort Zeneli	11	3	6+5	3	0+0	0	0+0	0	0+0	0
Forwards
9	FW	(Germany) GER	Mateo Biondic	12	2	6+4	2	0+2	0	0+0	0	0+0	0
11	FW	(Brazil) BRA	Guilherme Smith	27	4	16+5	4	3+0	0	3+0	0	0+0	0
12	FW	(Canada) CAN	Promise David	36	16	17+7	10	2+2	4	5+2	2	0+1	0
13	FW	(Ecuador) ECU	Kevin Rodríguez	36	12	19+7	8	2+2	4	3+2	0	1+0	0
20	FW	(Switzerland) SUI	Marc Giger	21	3	5+11	3	1+0	0	0+4	0	0+0	0
25	FW	(Israel) ISR	Anan Khalaili	46	5	32+2	2	3+0	0	8+0	3	0+1	0
30	FW	(Austria) AUT	Raul Florucz	27	8	13+7	7	1+2	1	2+1	0	0+1	0
32	FW	(Belgium) BEL	Sekou Keita	3	0	0+2	0	0+0	0	0+1	0	0+0	0
77	FW	(Ghana) GHA	Mohammed Fuseini	22	1	2+15	0	1+2	1	0+2	0	0+0	0
Players who have made appearances this season but have since left the squad
4	MF	(Norway) NOR	Mathias Rasmussen	23	2	8+9	2	2+0	0	1+3	0	0+0	0
9	FW	(Croatia) CRO	Franjo Ivanović	1	1	0+0	0	0+0	0	0+0	0	1+0	1
21	MF	(Belgium) BEL	Alessio Castro-Montes	6	0	2+3	0	0+0	0	0+0	0	1+0	0
23	MF	(Morocco) MAR	Sofiane Boufal	15	0	0+9	0	0+1	0	0+4	0	0+1	0
24	MF	(Belgium) BEL	Charles Vanhoutte	6	0	5+0	0	0+0	0	0+0	0	1+0	0
31	FW	(Equatorial Guinea) GEQ	Cristian Makaté	3	0	0+2	0	0+1	0	0+0	0	0+0	0

=== Goalscorers ===
Includes all competitive matches. The list is sorted by squad number when total goals are equal. Players with no goals not included in the list.

Rank	No.	Pos.	Nat.	Name	Belgian Pro League (Note: Includes regular season and play-off games)	Belgian Cup	UEFA Champions League	Super Cup	Total
1	12	FW	(Canada)	Promise David	10	4	2	0	16
2	13	FW	(Ecuador)	Kevin Rodríguez	8	4	0	0	12
3	30	FW	(Austria)	Raul Florucz	7	1	0	0	8
4	25	FW	(Israel)	Anan Khalaili	2	0	3	0	5
4	26	DF	(England)	Ross Sykes	3	1	1	0	5
6	8	MF	(Algeria)	Adem Zorgane	4	0	0	0	4
6	11	FW	(Brazil)	Guilherme Smith	4	0	0	0	4
6	16	DF	(England)	Christian Burgess	4	0	0	0	4
9	20	FW	(Switzerland)	Marc Giger	3	0	0	0	3
9	23	MF	(Sweden)	Besfort Zeneli	3	0	0	0	3
11	4	MF	(Norway)	Mathias Rasmussen	2	0	0	0	2
11	5	DF	(Argentina)	Kevin Mac Allister	1	0	1	0	2
11	9	FW	(Germany)	Mateo Biondic	2	0	0	0	2
11	17	MF	(Belgium)	Rob Schoofs	2	0	0	0	2
11	22	MF	(Senegal)	Ousseynou Niang	2	0	0	0	2
16	6	MF	(Belgium)	Kamiel Van de Perre	0	1	0	0	1
16	9	FW	(Croatia)	Franjo Ivanović	0	0	0	1	1
16	10	MF	(Belgium)	Anouar Ait El Hadj	0	0	1	0	1
16	48	DF	(Belgium)	Fedde Leysen	1	0	0	0	1
16	77	FW	(Ghana)	Mohammed Fuseini	0	1	0	0	1
Own goal					1	0	0	0	1
Total					57	11	8	1	77

=== Assists ===
Includes all competitive matches. The list is sorted by squad number when total assists are equal. Players with no assists are not included in the list.

Rank	No.	Pos.	Nat.	Name	Belgian Pro League (Note: Includes regular season and play-off games)	Belgian Cup	UEFA Champions League	Super Cup	Total
1	8	MF	(Algeria)	Adem Zorgane	2	2	1	0	5
1	17	MF	(Belgium)	Rob Schoofs	2	2	1	0	5
2	10	MF	(Belgium)	Anouar Ait El Hadj	2	1	1	0	4
2	30	FW	(Austria)	Raul Florucz	3	1	0	0	4
4	22	MF	(Senegal)	Ousseynou Niang	3	0	0	0	3
4	23	MF	(Switzerland)	Besfort Zeneli	3	0	0	0	3
7	11	FW	(Brazil)	Guilherme Smith	2	0	0	0	2
7	12	FW	(Canada)	Promise David	1	1	0	0	2
7	23	MF	(Morocco)	Sofiane Boufal	1	0	1	0	2
10	4	MF	(Norway)	Mathias Rasmussen	1	0	0	0	1
10	5	DF	(Argentina)	Kevin Mac Allister	1	0	0	0	1
10	6	MF	(Belgium)	Kamiel Van de Perre	1	0	0	0	1
10	9	FW	(Germany)	Mateo Biondic	1	0	0	0	1
10	13	FW	(Ecuador)	Kevin Rodríguez	0	0	1	0	1
10	16	DF	(England)	Christian Burgess	1	0	0	0	1
10	20	FW	(Switzerland)	Marc Giger	1	0	0	0	1
10	24	MF	(Belgium)	Charles Vanhoutte	1	0	0	0	1
10	26	DF	(England)	Ross Sykes	1	0	0	0	1
10	27	DF	(Belgium)	Louis Patris	1	0	0	0	1
10	48	DF	(Belgium)	Fedde Leysen	1	0	0	0	1
Total					27	7	4	0	38

=== Disciplinary record ===
Includes all competitions for senior teams. The list is sorted by red cards, then yellow cards (and by squad number when total cards are equal). Players with no cards not included in the list.

Rank	No.	Pos.	Nat.	Name	Belgian Pro League			Belgian Cup			UEFA Champions League			Super Cup			Total			
Rank	No.	Pos.	Nat.	Name	Yellow card	(yellow card) (yellow-red card)	(yellow card) (red card)	Yellow card	(yellow card) (yellow-red card)	(yellow card) (red card)	Yellow card	(yellow card) (yellow-red card)	(yellow card) (red card)	Yellow card	(yellow card) (yellow-red card)	(yellow card) (red card)	Yellow card	(yellow card) (yellow-red card)	(yellow card) (red card)	
1	16	DF	(England)	Christian Burgess	11	1	0	0	0	0	3	0	0	1	0	0	15	1	0	
2	5	DF	(Argentina)	Kevin Mac Allister	12	0	0	1	0	0	2	0	0	0	0	0	15	0	0	
3	6	MF	(Belgium)	Kamiel Van de Perre	8	0	0	0	0	0	2	0	0	0	0	0	10	0	0	
4	22	MF	(Senegal)	Ousseynou Niang	5	0	0	0	0	0	2	0	0	1	0	0	8	0	0	
4	25	FW	(Israel)	Anan Khalaili	6	0	0	1	0	0	1	0	0	0	0	0	8	0	0	
4	26	DF	(England)	Ross Sykes	6	0	0	1	0	0	1	0	0	0	0	0	8	0	0	
7	8	MF	(Algeria)	Adem Zorgane	5	0	0	0	0	0	1	0	0	0	0	0	6	0	0	
8	12	FW	(Canada)	Promise David	1	0	0	0	0	0	3	0	0	0	0	0	4	0	0	
8	17	MF	(Belgium)	Rob Schoofs	3	0	0	0	0	0	1	0	0	0	0	0	4	0	0	
10	11	FW	(Brazil)	Guilherme Smith	3	0	0	0	0	0	0	0	0	0	0	0	3	0	0	
10	20	FW	(Switzerland)	Marc Giger	2	0	0	0	0	0	1	0	0	0	0	0	3	0	0	
12	10	MF	(Belgium)	Anouar Ait El Hadj	2	0	0	0	0	0	0	0	0	0	0	0	2	0	0	
12	24	MF	(Belgium)	Charles Vanhoutte	2	0	0	0	0	0	0	0	0	0	0	0	2	0	0	
12	27	DF	(Belgium)	Louis Patris	2	0	0	0	0	0	0	0	0	0	0	0	2	0	0	
12	48	DF	(Belgium)	Fedde Leysen	2	0	0	0	0	0	0	0	0	0	0	0	2	0	0	
16	1	GK	(Belgium)	Vic Chambaere	1	0	0	0	0	0	0	0	0	0	0	0	1	0	0	
16	4	MF	(Norway)	Mathias Rasmussen	1	0	0	0	0	0	0	0	0	0	0	0	1	0	0	
16	13	FW	(Ecuador)	Kevin Rodríguez	1	0	0	0	0	0	0	0	0	0	0	0	1	0	0	
16	14	MF	(Netherlands)	Ivan Pavlić	1	0	0	0	0	0	0	0	0	0	0	0	1	0	0	
16	23	MF	(Morocco)	Sofiane Boufal	0	0	0	1	0	0	0	0	0	0	0	0	1	0	0	
16	30	FW	(Austria)	Raul Florucz	1	0	0	0	0	0	0	0	0	0	0	0	1	0	0	
16	37	GK	(Netherlands)	Kjell Scherpen	1	0	0	0	0	0	0	0	0	0	0	0	1	0	0	
16	Total					73	1	0	4	0	0	13	0	0	2	0	0	92	1	0

=== Clean sheets ===
Includes all competitive matches. The list is sorted by squad number when total clean sheets are equal. Numbers in parentheses represent games where both goalkeepers participated and both kept a clean sheet; the number in parentheses is awarded to the goalkeeper who was substituted on, whilst a full clean sheet is awarded to the goalkeeper who was on the field at the start of play. Players with no clean sheets not included in the list.

Rank	No.	Nat.	Name	Belgian Pro League (Note: Include regular season and play-off games)	Belgian Cup	UEFA Champions League	Super Cup	Total
1	37	(Netherlands)	Kjell Scherpen	13	2	1	0	16
2	1	(Belgium)	Vic Chambaere	3	0 (1)	0	0	3 (1)
Totals				16	3	1	0	20
