= Cristian Makaté =

Equatoguinean footballer (born 2002)

Personal information
- Full name: Cristian Makaté Bokoya
- Date of birth: 21 September 2002 (age 24)
- Place of birth: Spain
- Height: 1.78 m (5 ft 10 in)
- Position: Forward

Team information
- Current team: Lierse

Youth career
- 2010–2011: Bellver Palma
- 2011–2012: CD Palma de Son Gotleu
- 2012–2017: Penya Arrabal
- 2017–2019: Mallorca
- 2019–2020: CD San Francisco

Senior career*
Years	Team	Apps	(Gls)
2020–2021	Mallorca B	18	(2)
2021	Platges de Calvià	16	(3)
2022	GSD Ambrosiana	4	(0)
2022–2025	Union SG B	82	(53)
2025–2026	Union SG	2	(0)
2026	→ La Louvière (loan)	6	(0)
2026–	Lierse	0	(0)

International career^{‡}
2024–	Equatorial Guinea	2	(0)
- * Club domestic league appearances and goals as of 11 May 2026 ‡ National team caps and goals as of 4 September 2025

Cristian Makaté Bokoya (born 21 September 2002) is a professional footballer who plays as a forward for Challenger Pro League club Lierse. Born in Spain, he plays for the Equatorial Guinea national team.

== Club career ==
On 25 November 2021, Makaté signed for Spanish side CF Platges de Calvià. He was regarded as a prospect while playing for the club.

On 14 October 2022, Makaté signed for Belgian side Royale Union Saint-Gilloise B. He was regarded as one of the club's most important players.

On 2 June 2025, Makaté extended his Union SG contract until 2029 and was definitely promoted to the first team. On 28 January 2026, he moved to loan to La Louvière.

On 12 August 2026, Makaté signed for Challenger Pro League club Lierse a two-year contract with an option to extend.

== International career ==
Makaté is an Equatorial Guinea international. He was first called up to the Equatorial Guinea national football team in 2024.

== Career statistics ==
=== Club ===
As of match played 9 August 2025

Appearances and goals by club, season and competition
Club	Season	League			National cup (Note: Includes Belgian Cup)		Europe		Other		Total	
Club	Season	Division	Apps	Goals	Apps	Goals	Apps	Goals	Apps	Goals	Apps	Goals
Mallorca B	2020–21	Tercera División	18	2	—		—		3 (Note: Appearances in 2021 Tercera División play-offs)	0	21	2
Platges de Calvià	2021–22	Serie D	16	3	—		—		—		16	3
GSD Ambrosiana	2022–23	—	4	0	—		—		—		4	0
Union SG B	2022–23	Belgian Division 2	24	15	—		—		—		24	15
Union SG B	2023–24	Belgian Division 2	30	18	—		—		—		30	18
Union SG B	2024–25	Belgian Division 1	28	20	—		—		—		28	20
Union SG B	Total		82	53	—		—		—		82	53
Union SG	2024–25	Belgian Pro League	0	0	1	0	0	0	—		1	0
Union SG	2025–26	Belgian Pro League	2	0	0	0	0	0	0	0	2	0
Union SG	Total		2	0	1	0	0	0	0	0	3	0
Career total			122	58	1	0	0	0	3	0	126	58

=== International ===
As of match played 4 September 2025

Appearances and goals by national team and year
National team	Year	Apps	Goals
Equatorial Guinea	2024	1	0
Equatorial Guinea	2025	1	0
Total		2	0
