= Ivan Pavlić =

Dutch footballer (born 2001)

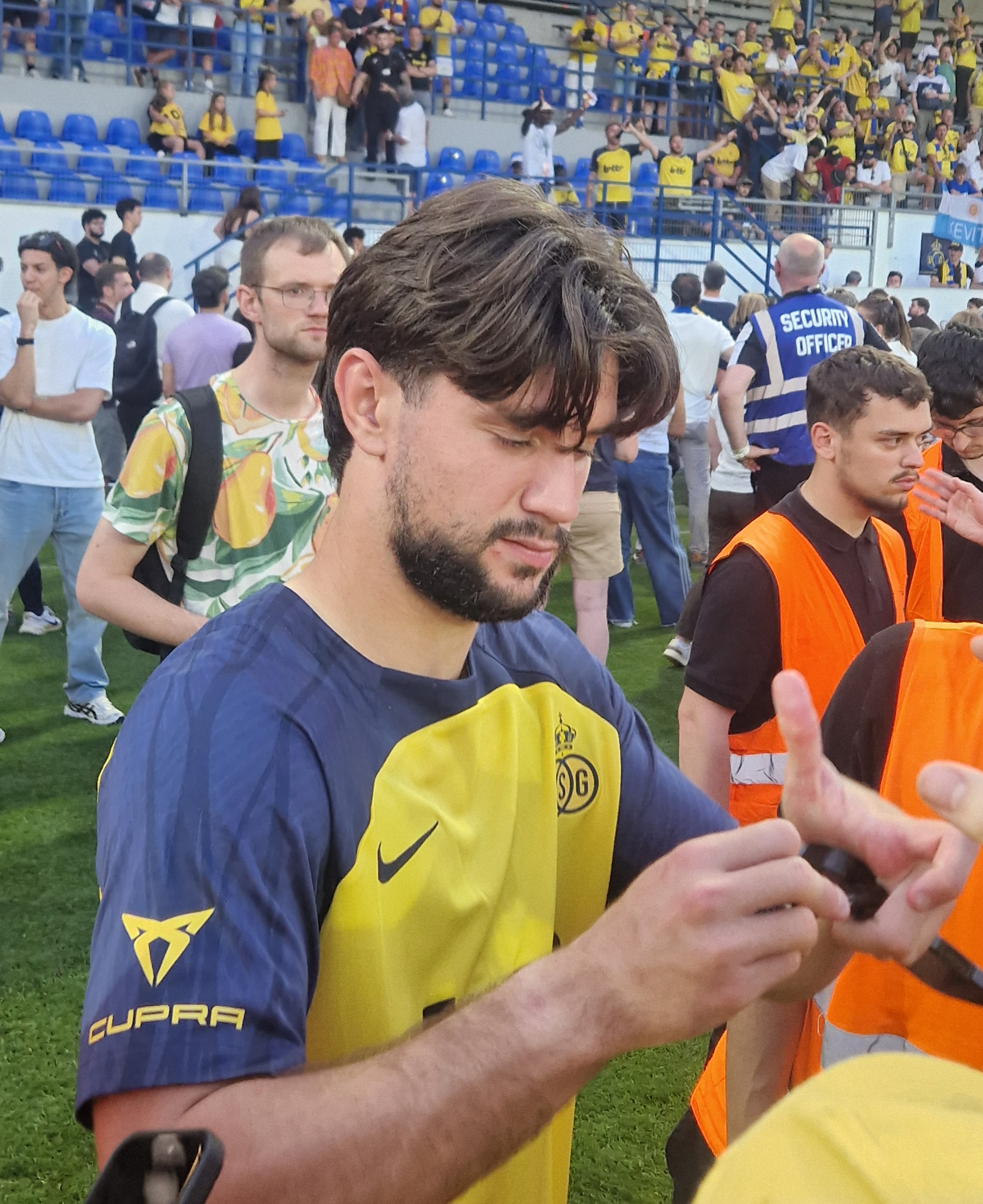
- Pavlić in 2026

Personal information
- Date of birth: 10 November 2001 (age 25)
- Place of birth: Rotterdam, Netherlands
- Height: 1.85 m (6 ft 1 in)
- Position: Attacking midfielder

Team information
- Current team: Union Saint-Gilloise
- Number: 14

Youth career
- Excelsior
- Smitshoek
- 2015–2016: Spartaan'20
- 2016–2021: Royal Antwerp

Senior career*
| Years | Team | Apps | (Gls) |
| 2021 | Royal Antwerp | 0 | (0) |
| 2021–2022 | Académica | 5 | (0) |
| 2022–2024 | Estoril | 5 | (0) |
| 2024–2025 | Paços de Ferreira | 36 | (2) |
| 2025– | Union Saint-Gilloise | 10 | (0) |
- * Club domestic league appearances and goals as of 25 October 2026

Ivan Pavlić (born 10 November 2001) is a Dutch professional footballer who plays as an attacking midfielder for Belgian Pro League club Union SG.

== Club career ==
Pavlić was born in Rotterdam to Serbian parents, and started his career with Excelsior and Smitshoek, before joining amateur side Spartaan'20. At the age of fourteen, he moved to Belgium to sign for Royal Antwerp. While at Antwerp, he was named twice on the bench in the UEFA Europa League.

After five years in Antwerp, Pavlić failed to agree a new deal, and was allowed to leave the club. He moved abroad again, this time to Portugal, signing with Académica.

In July 2022, Pavlić signed a two-year contract with Primeira Liga side Estoril, initially joining the club's U23s. On 31 January 2024, Pavlić's contract was terminated by mutual agreement.

On 3 September 2025, Pavlić joined Belgian champions Union SG on a four-season contract.

== International career ==
Pavlić remains eligible to represent the Netherlands, Belgium and Serbia at international level. He has stated his intention to play for Serbia.

== Career statistics ==
As of 25 October 2026

Appearances and goals by club, season and competition
| Club | Season | League | | | National cup (Note: Includes Taça de Portugal) | | League cup (Note: Includes Taça da Liga) | | Europe | | Other | | Total | |
| Club | Season | Division | Apps | Goals | Apps | Goals | Apps | Goals | Apps | Goals | Apps | Goals | Apps | Goals |
|---|---|---|---|---|---|---|---|---|---|---|---|---|---|---|
| Académica | 2021–22 | Liga Portugal 2 | 5 | 0 | 0 | 0 | — | | — | | 0 | 0 | 5 | 0 |
| Estoril Praia | 2023–24 | Primeira Liga | 5 | 0 | 0 | 0 | 3 | 0 | — | | — | | 8 | 0 |
| Paços de Ferreira | 2024–25 | Liga Portugal 2 | 32 | 2 | 2 | 0 | — | | — | | 2 (Note: Appearances in promotion play-offs) | 0 | 36 | 0 |
| Paços de Ferreira | 2025–26 | Liga Portugal 2 | 4 | 0 | 0 | 0 | — | | — | | — | | 4 | 0 |
| Paços de Ferreira | Total | | 36 | 2 | 2 | 0 | — | | — | | 2 | 0 | 40 | 0 |
| Union SG | 2025–26 | Belgian Pro League | 9 | 0 | 1 | 0 | — | | 0 | 0 | — | | 10 | 0 |
| Union SG | 2026–27 | Belgian Pro League | 1 | 0 | 1 | 0 | — | | 0 | 0 | — | | 2 | 0 |
| Union SG | Total | | 10 | 0 | 2 | 0 | — | | 0 | 0 | — | | 12 | 1 |
| Career total | | | 56 | 0 | 4 | 0 | 3 | 0 | 0 | 0 | 2 | 0 | 65 | 0 |

== Honours ==
Union SG

- Belgian Cup: 2025–26
