= Anan Khalaili =

Israeli footballer

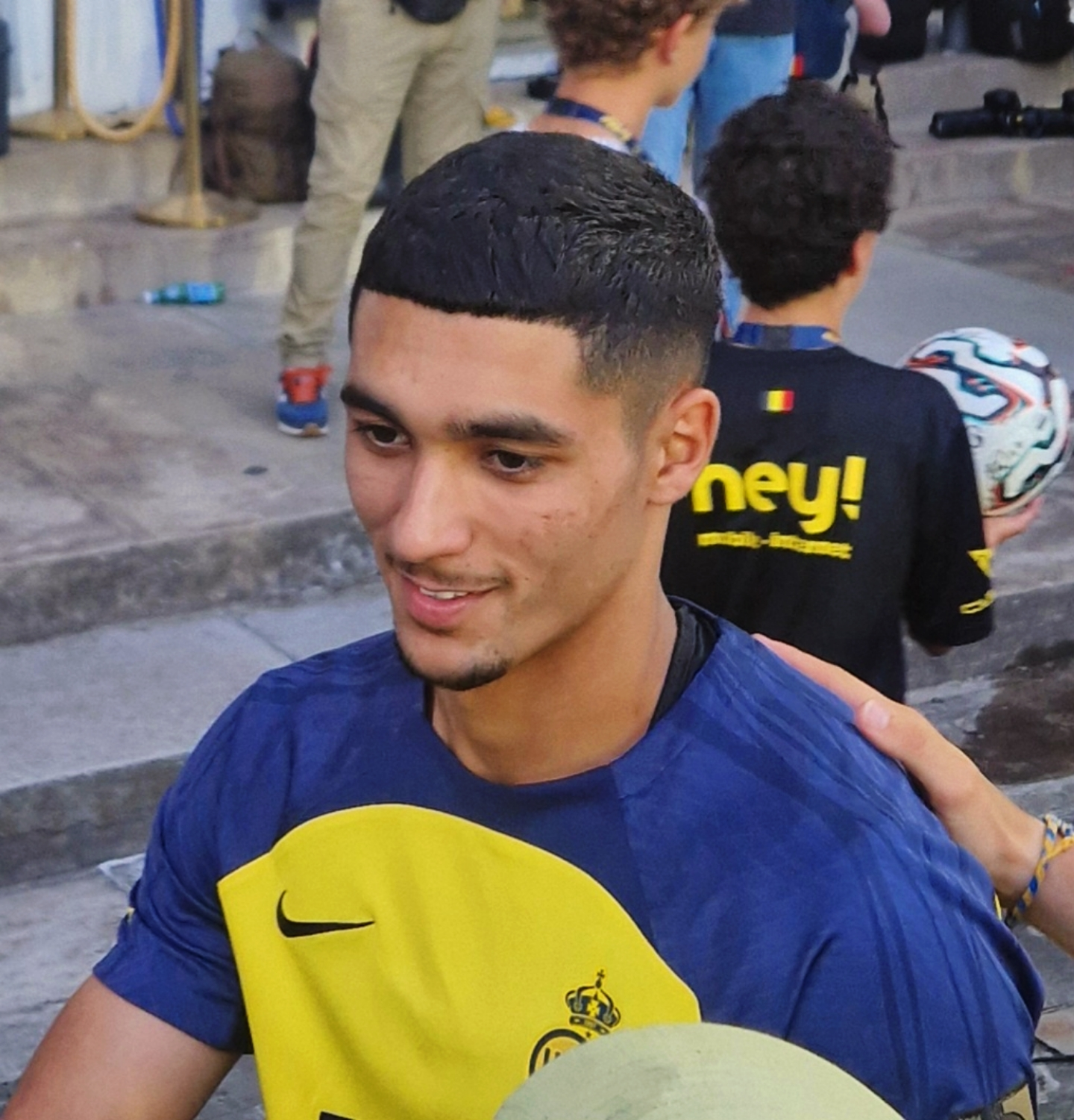
- Khalaili with Union SG in 2026

Personal information
- Full name: Anan Khalaili
- Date of birth: 3 September 2004 (age 22)
- Place of birth: Haifa, Israel
- Height: 1.83 m (6 ft 0 in)
- Positions: Right-back; right wing-back

Team information
- Current team: Crystal Palace
- Number: 25

Youth career
- 2012–2014: Beitar Haifa
- 2014–2023: Maccabi Haifa
- 2019–2020: → FC Neve Yosef (loan)

Senior career*
Years	Team	Apps	(Gls)
2023–2024	Maccabi Haifa	30	(8)
2024–2026	Union Saint-Gilloise	72	(5)
2026–	Crystal Palace	11	(1)

International career^{‡}
2022–2023	Israel U19	12	(1)
2023	Israel U20	6	(3)
2023	Israel U21	6	(0)
2023–	Israel	19	(0)
Medal record
Men's football
Representing Israel
FIFA U-20 World Cup
Third place	2023 Argentina
- * Club domestic league appearances and goals as of 21 November 2026 ‡ National team caps and goals as of 20:23, 1 October 2026 (UTC)

Anan Khalaili (Arabic: عنان خلايلي, Hebrew: ענאן ח'לאילי; born 3 September 2004) is an Israeli professional footballer who plays as a right-back or right wing-back for English Premier League club Crystal Palace and the Israel national team.

== Early life ==
Anan Khalaili was born in Haifa, Israel, to a Muslim-Arab family who moved there from the Arab town of Sakhnin, Israel. His father Majdi Khalaili is a former footballer, who used to play as a goalkeeper. His younger brother Iyad Khalaili is also a footballer who plays for Israeli Premier League club Maccabi Haifa.

== Club career ==
Khalaili joined the academy of local side Beitar Haifa in 2012, spending two seasons before a move to Maccabi Haifa. After a number of seasons with Maccabi Haifa, he spent the 2019–20 season with the Neve Yosef academy. Khalaili played as a forward in his youth, and scored twenty-five goals in twenty-four games, prompting Maccabi Haifa to recall him. His father, who worked as a coach at local FC Neve Yosef, stated that Maccabi Haifa had initially expected Khalaili to spend two seasons with the academy, but due to his performances, they requested him back after only one season.

=== Maccabi Haifa ===
On 2 February 2022, Khalaili made his senior debut in the 2–0 win against Hapoel Hadera in the Israel State Cup competition. On 11 July 2023, he scored his debut goal for the senior team in the 4–0 win against Maltese side Ħamrun Spartans in the UEFA Champions League qualifying.

=== Union SG ===
On 3 April 2024 signed for the Belgian Pro League club Union SG. He contributed to their first Belgian Pro League title in 90 years during the 2024–25 season. He featured in the 2026 Belgian Cup final as his club secured a 3–1 win over Anderlecht after extra time. On 9 December 2025, he scored his first UEFA Champions League goals by netting a brace in a 3–2 defeat against French side Marseille.

On 13 July 2026, Khalaili's move to Inter Milan collapsed after he failed mandatory medical tests in Italy. The examinations, supervised by CONI, found irregularities that prevented him from receiving clearance to play in Italian Serie A. Inter president Giuseppe Marotta stated that the decision was due to Italy's strict health regulations and not the club's choice.

=== Crystal Palace ===
Khalaili signed with English Premier League club Crystal Palace on 15 August 2026 until 2031, for a reported £21m fee.

== International career ==
Khalaili played for the Israel national under-20 team during the 2023 FIFA U-20 World Cup campaign. During the tournament, he scored the game-winning goal against Uzbekistan and scored the third and final goal of the game against South Korea.

Khalaili made his senior international debut on 15 November 2023 against Switzerland in a 1–1 draw.

== Style of play ==
Khalaili is a versatile two-footed right sided player who was mainly a winger in his time at Maccabi Haifa, but after he moved to Union SG, he transitioned into an effective wing-back or full-back. He has also occasionally been deployed as a wide or inside forward for the Israel national team. Khalaili is known for his work rate, dribbling and tactical versatility, combining close ball control and progressive ball carrying with defensive discipline, while creating chances through crosses and key passes.

== Career statistics ==
=== Club ===
As of match played 21 November 2026

Club	Season	League			National cup (Note: Includes Israel State Cup, Belgian Cup)		League cup (Note: Includes Toto Cup)		Europe		Other		Total	
Club	Season	Division	Apps	Goals	Apps	Goals	Apps	Goals	Apps	Goals	Apps	Goals	Apps	Goals
Maccabi Haifa	2021–22	Israeli Premier League	0	0	1	0	0	0	0	0	0	0	1	0
Maccabi Haifa	2022–23	Israeli Premier League	0	0	0	0	0	0	0	0	0	0	0	0
Maccabi Haifa	2023–24	Israeli Premier League	31	8	3	2	2	1	15 (Note: Six appearances in UEFA Champions League, six appearances in UEFA Europa League, three appearances in UEFA Europa Conference League)	3	1 (Note: Appearance in Israel Super Cup)	1	52	15
Maccabi Haifa	Total		31	8	4	2	2	1	15	3	1	1	53	15
Union SG	2024–25	Belgian Pro League	34	2	3	0	—		9 (Note: Appearance(s) in UEFA Europa League)	0	1 (Note: Appearance in Belgian Super Cup)	0	47	2
Union SG	2025–26	Belgian Pro League	38	3	5	0	—		8 (Note: Appearance(s) in UEFA Champions League)	3	1	0	52	6
Union SG	2026–27	Belgian Pro League	0	0	—		—		1	0	1	0	2	0
Union SG	Total		72	5	8	0	—		18	3	3	0	101	8
Crystal Palace	2026–27	Premier League	11	1	0	0	0	0	3	0	—		14	1
Career total			114	14	12	2	2	1	36	6	4	1	168	24

=== International ===
As of match played 1 October 2026

Appearances and goals by national team and year
National team	Year	Apps	Goals
Israel	2023	3	0
Israel	2024	6	0
Israel	2025	6	0
Israel	2026	4	0
Total		19	0

== Honours ==
Maccabi Haifa

- Israel Super Cup: 2023

Union SG

- Belgian Pro League: 2024–25
- Belgian Cup: 2025–26
- Belgian Super Cup: 2024
