= Vic Chambaere =

Belgian footballer

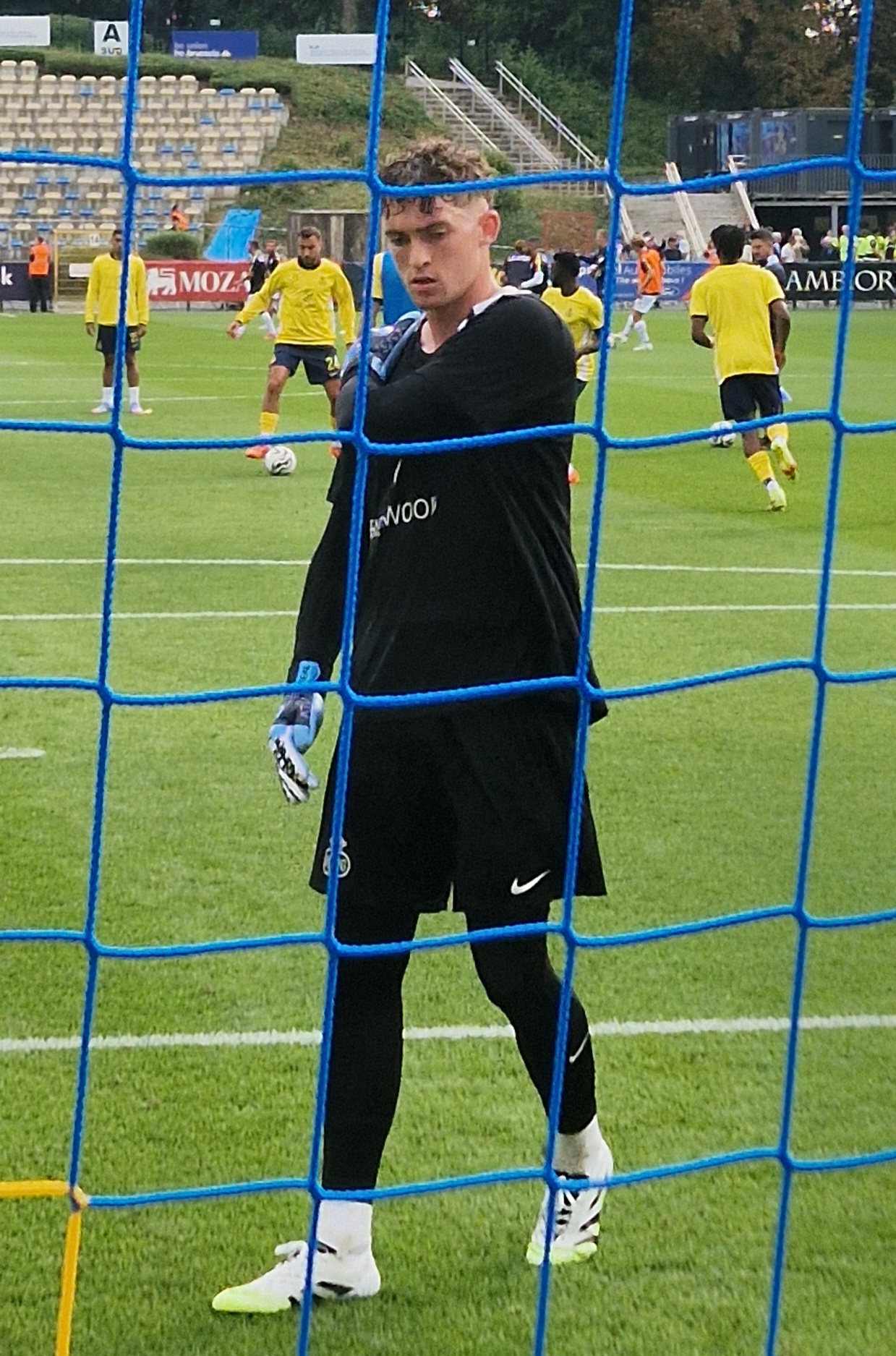
- Chambaere in 2025

Personal information
- Full name: Vic Dieter Chambaere
- Date of birth: 10 January 2003 (age 23)
- Place of birth: Roeselare, Belgium
- Height: 1.91 m (6 ft 3 in)
- Position: Goalkeeper

Team information
- Current team: Union Saint-Gilloise
- Number: 1

Youth career
- WS Lauwe
- 2011–2016: Kortrijk
- 2016–2022: Genk

Senior career*
Years	Team	Apps	(Gls)
2021–2024	Jong Genk	4	(0)
2021–2024	Genk	0	(0)
2024–	Union Saint-Gilloise U23	6	(0)
2024–	Union Saint-Gilloise	11	(0)

International career
2018	Belgium U15	4	(0)
2018–2019	Belgium U16	7	(0)
2019–2020	Belgium U17	2	(0)
2021	Belgium U19	5	(0)
2022	Belgium U20	1	(0)
- * Club domestic league appearances and goals as of 22:13, 8 August 2026 (UTC)

Vic Dieter Chambaere (born 10 January 2003) is a Belgian professional footballer who plays as a goalkeeper for the Belgian Pro League club Union Saint-Gilloise.

== Club career ==
Chambaere is a youth product of WS Lauwe, Kortrijk and Genk. He signed his first professional contract with Genk on 26 November 2018. On 15 January 2021, he extended his contract with Genk. On 23 March 2021, he was promoted to Genk's senior squad.

On 6 July 2024, Chambaere transferred to Union Saint-Gilloise on a contract until 2027. Chambaere was on the bench for Union Saint-Gilloise as they won the 2024 Belgian Super Cup, a 2–1 win over Club Brugge on 20 July 2024.He controversially and anonymously threw a ball into the field in a match that led to a 2–1 win over his previous club Genk and was banned for six games; the win helped the club extend a lead that eventually led to them winning the 2024–25 Belgian Pro League. Following that, the previous starting goalkeeper, Luxembourger Anthony Moris, left for Al-Khaleej, Chambaere made his senior debut with Union Saint-Gilloise as the starter in the 2025 Belgian Super Cup, a 2–1 loss to Club Brugge on 20 July 2025.

== International career ==
Chambaere was a youth international for Belgium, having played up to the Belgium U20s.

== Career statistics ==
As of match played 18 October 2026

Appearances and goals by club, season and competition
Club	Season	League			Belgian Cup		Europe		Other		Total	
Club	Season	Division	Apps	Goals	Apps	Goals	Apps	Goals	Apps	Goals	Apps	Goals
Jong Genk	2022–23	Challenger Pro League	2	0	—		—		—		2	0
Jong Genk	2023–24	Challenger Pro League	2	0	—		—		—		2	0
Jong Genk	Total		4	0	—		—		—		4	0
Union Saint-Gilloise U23	2024–25	Belgian Division 1	5	0	—		—		—		5	0
Union Saint-Gilloise U23	2025–26	Belgian Division 1	2	0	—		—		—		2	0
Union Saint-Gilloise U23	Total		7	0	—		—		—		7	0
Union Saint-Gilloise	2025–26	Belgian Pro League	10	0	4	0	0	0	1 (Note: Appearance in Belgian Super Cup)	0	15	0
Union Saint-Gilloise	2026–27	Belgian Pro League	1	0	1	0	2 (Note: Two appearances in UEFA Champions League)	0	1	0	5	0
Union Saint-Gilloise	Total		11	0	5	0	2	0	2	0	20	0
Career total			22	0	5	0	2	0	2	0	31	0

== Honours ==
Union Saint-Gilloise

- Belgian Pro League: 2024–25
- Belgian Cup: 2025–26
- Belgian Super Cup: 2024
