= Mateo Biondić =

German footballer (born 2003)

Personal information
- Date of birth: 24 July 2003 (age 23)
- Place of birth: Lemgo, Germany
- Height: 1.90 m (6 ft 3 in)
- Positions: Winger; forward

Team information
- Current team: Union SG
- Number: 9

Youth career
- –2015: TBV Lemgo
- 2015–2017: Hannover 96
- 2017–2019: Schalke 04
- 2019–2022: SC Paderborn

Senior career*
Years	Team	Apps	(Gls)
2020–2022	Paderborn 07 II		
2022–2025	SC Verl	5	(0)
2022–2023	→ SC Verl (loan)	18	(4)
2024–2025	→ Eintracht Trier (loan)	41	(8)
2025	Eintracht Trier	17	(7)
2026–	Union SG	23	(6)
- * Club domestic league appearances and goals as of 11 October 2026

Mateo Biondić (born 24 July 2003) is a German-Croatian professional footballer who plays as a winger or forward for Belgian Pro League club Union Saint-Gilloise.

== Early life ==
Biondić was born on 24 July 2003. Of Croatian descent through his parents, he is a native of Lemgo, Germany.

== Career ==
Biondić started his career with German side Paderborn 07 II. Ahead of the 2022–23 season, he signed for German side SC Verl, where he made five league appearances and scored zero goals.

During the summer of 2024, he signed for German side Eintracht Trier, where he made 58 league appearances and scored 15 goals. Following his stint there, he signed for Belgian side Royale Union Saint-Gilloise in 2026.

== Style of play ==
Biondić plays as a winger or forward. Croatian newspaper Večernji list wrote in 2026 that "he is a modern and versatile striker with an impressive height of 190 centimeters, who, in addition to the position of central striker, also excels on the wing. His physical strength, combined with a sense of goal and creation".

== Career statistics ==
As of match played 22 October 2026

Appearances and goals by club, season and competition
Club	Season	League			National cup (Note: Includes Belgian Cup)		Europe		Other		Total	
Club	Season	Division	Apps	Goals	Apps	Goals	Apps	Goals	Apps	Goals	Apps	Goals
SC Verl	2022–23	3. Liga	5	0	—		—		2 (Note: Appearances in Westphalian Cup)	2	7	2
SC Verl II (loan)	2022–23	Westfalenliga	18	4	—		—		—		18	4
Eintracht Trier (loan)	2023–24	Oberliga Rheinland-Pfalz/Saar	21	7	—		—		3 (Note: Appearances in Rhineland Cup)	1	24	8
Eintracht Trier (loan)	2024–25	Regionalliga Südwest	20	1	—		—		5	4	25	5
Eintracht Trier (loan)	Total		41	8	—		—		8	5	49	13
Eintracht Trier	2025–26	Regionalliga Südwest	17	7	—		—		2	0	19	7
Union Saint-Gilloise	2025–26	Belgian Pro League	15	4	3	0	0	0	—		18	4
Union Saint-Gilloise	2026–27	Belgian Pro League	7	2	1	0	4 (Note: One appearance in UEFA Champions League, three appearances and one goal in UEFA Europa League)	1	—		12	3
Union Saint-Gilloise	Total		22	6	4	0	4	1	0	0	30	7
Career total			103	25	4	0	4	1	12	7	123	33

== Honours ==
Union SG

- Belgian Cup: 2025–26
