= Marc Giger =

Swiss footballer (born 2004

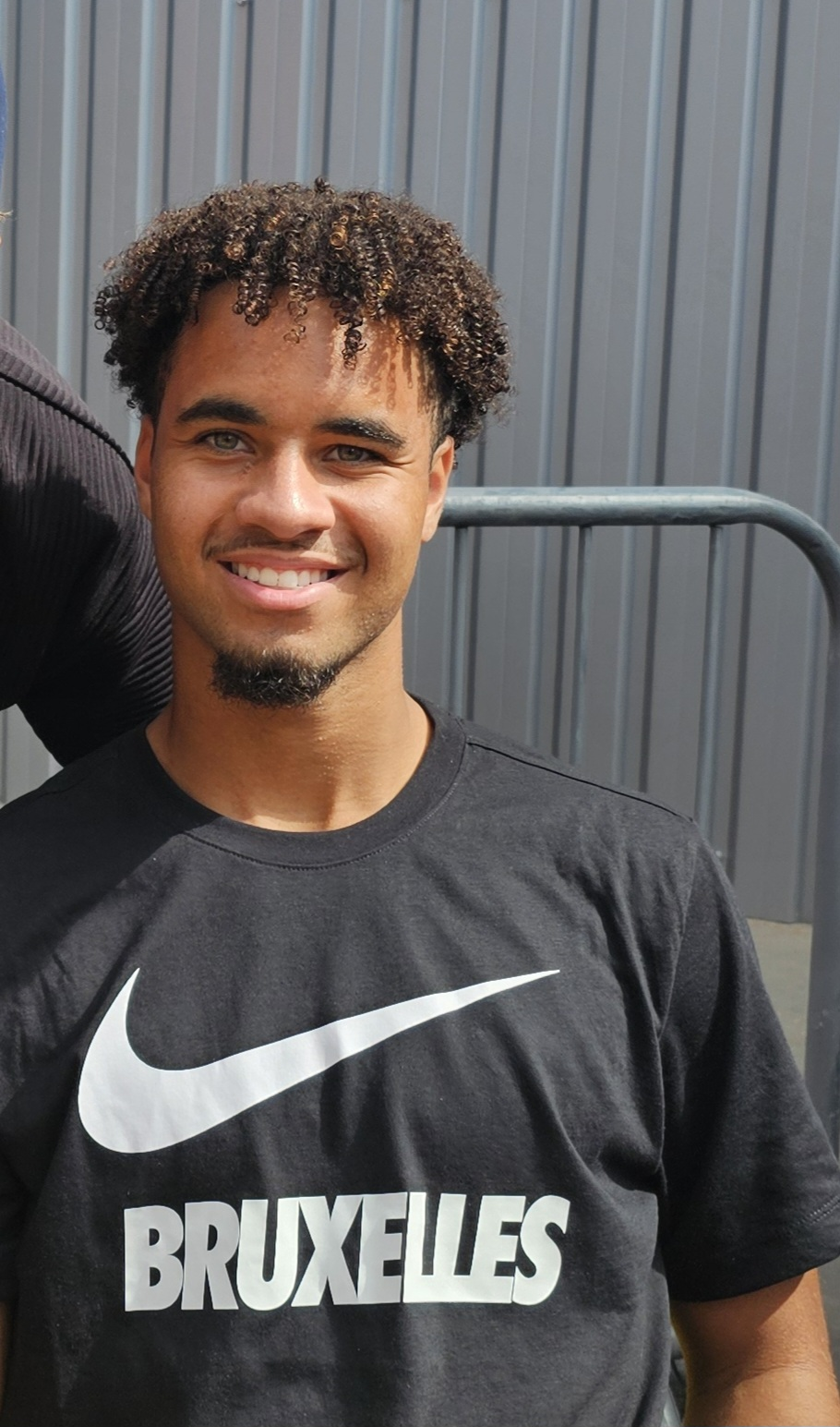
- Giger with Union Saint-Gilloise in 2025

Personal information
- Full name: Marc Philipp Giger
- Date of birth: 27 March 2004 (age 22)
- Place of birth: Kilchberg, Switzerland
- Height: 1.86 m (6 ft 1 in)
- Position: Forward

Team information
- Current team: ETO Győr

Youth career
- –2022: Grasshopper Club Zurich

Senior career*
Years	Team	Apps	(Gls)
2022–2023	FC Linth 04	23	(7)
2023	FC Paradiso	16	(7)
2024	FC Schaffhausen	32	(5)
2025–2026	Union Saint-Gilloise	19	(3)
2026–	ETO Győr	0	(0)

International career^{‡}
2024	Switzerland U20	5	(2)
2025–	Switzerland U21	6	(0)
- * Club domestic league appearances and goals as of 4 September 2026 ‡ National team caps and goals as of 14 November 2025

Marc Philipp Giger (born 27 March 2004) is a Swiss professional footballer who plays as a forward for Hungarian First League club ETO Győr.

== Early life ==
Giger was born on 27 March 2004 in Kilchberg, Switzerland and is of Cameroonian and Swiss descent. Giger holds both Cameroonian and swiss The son of Philipp Giger, he is the older brother of Swiss footballer Alexander Giger.

== Club career ==
As a youth player, Giger joined the youth academy of Swiss side Grasshopper Club Zurich. Ahead of the 2022–23 season, he signed for Swiss side FC Linth 04, before signing for Swiss side FC Paradiso, where he received interest from the youth academy of Italian Serie A side Juventus FC.

In 2024, he signed for Swiss side FC Schaffhausen, where he made thirty-two league appearances and scored five goals. One year later, he signed for Belgian side Royale Union Saint-Gilloise, helping the club win the league title. On 16 February 2025, he debuted for them during a 1–0 home loss to KV Mechelen in the league.

== Style of play ==
Giger plays as a forward. Right-footed, he is known for his aerial ability.

== Career statistics ==
As of match played 14 March 2026

Appearances and goals by club, season and competition
Club	Season	League			National cup (Note: Includes Swiss Cup, Belgian Cup)		Europe		Other		Total	
Club	Season	Division	Apps	Goals	Apps	Goals	Apps	Goals	Apps	Goals	Apps	Goals
Linth 04	2022–23	1. Liga Classic	23	7	—		—		1 (Note: Appearance in Swiss Cup qualification)	0	24	7
FC Paradiso	2023–24	Promotion League	16	7	—		—		—		16	7
FC Schaffhausen	2023–24	Swiss Challenge League	17	1	0	0	—		—		17	1
FC Schaffhausen	2024–25	Swiss Challenge League	15	4	3	2	—		—		18	6
FC Schaffhausen	Total		32	5	3	2	—		—		35	7
Union Saint-Gilloise	2024–25	Belgian Pro League	3	0	—		—		—		3	0
Union Saint-Gilloise	2025–26	Belgian Pro League	16	3	1	0	5 (Note: Appearances in UEFA Champions League)	0	—		22	3
Union Saint-Gilloise	Total		19	3	1	0	5	0	0	0	25	3
ETO Győr	2026–27	Nemzeti Bajnokság I	0	0	0	0	—		—		0	0
Career total			90	22	4	2	5	0	1	0	100	24

== Honours ==
Union SG

- Belgian Pro League: 2024–25
- Belgian Cup: 2025–26
