= 2024–25 F.C. Paços de Ferreira season =

F.C. Paços de Ferreira
2024–25 season
- Manager: Ricardo
- Stadium: Estádio da Mata Real
- Liga Portugal 2: 14th
- Taça de Portugal: Third round
- Top goalscorer: League: João Caiado (4); All: João Caiado (4)
- Average home league attendance: 1,781
- Biggest win: Peniche 0–2 Paços de Ferreira; Oliveirense 0–2 Paços de Ferreira
- Biggest defeat: Paços de Ferreira 0–3 Benfica B

The 2024–25 season is the 75th in the history of FC Paços de Ferreira and the second consecutive season in Liga Portugal 2. The team was eliminated by Vitória de Guimarães in the third round of the Taça de Portugal.

== Transfers ==
=== In ===
Pos.	Player	Transferred from	Fee	Date	Source
FW	(Ecuador) Emerson Pata	(Ecuador) Independiente Juniors	Free	27 August 2024	
FW	(Belarus) Vladislav Morozov	(Portugal) Arouca	Loan	7 January 2025	

== Competitions ==
=== Overall record ===
Competition	First match	Last match	Starting round	Final position	Record							
Competition	First match	Last match	Starting round	Final position	Pld	W	D	L	GF	GA	GD	Win %
Liga Portugal 2	10 August 2024	17 May 2025	Matchday 1		15	4	3	8	16	24	−8	26.67
Taça de Portugal	22 September 2024	19 October 2024	Second round	Third round	2	1	0	1	3	3	+0	50.00
Total					17	5	3	9	19	27	−8	29.41

Source: Competitions

=== Liga Portugal 2 ===
==== League table ====
Pos	Team	Pld	W	D	L	GF	GA	GD	Pts	Promotion or relegation
14	Porto B	34	8	11	15	36	47	−11	35	Ineligible for promotion
15	Portimonense	34	9	7	18	38	54	−16	34	
16	Paços de Ferreira (O)	34	9	6	19	34	50	−16	33	Qualification to Relegation play-offs
17	Oliveirense	34	7	8	19	30	64	−34	29	Remained in Liga 2 because Boavista failed to register.
18	Mafra (R)	34	6	9	19	29	54	−25	27	Relegation to Liga 3

Source: Liga Portugal 2
Rules for classification: 1) Points; 2) Head-to-head points; 3) Head-to-head goal difference; 4) Goal difference; 5) Matches won; 6) Goals scored; 7) Play-off.
(O) Play-off winners; (R) Relegated

==== Results summary ====
Overall								Home						Away					
Pld	W	D	L	GF	GA	GD	Pts	W	D	L	GF	GA	GD	W	D	L	GF	GA	GD
15	4	3	8	16	24	−8	15	1	2	5	7	15	−8	3	1	3	9	9	0

Last updated: 22 December 2024.

==== Results by round ====
Round	1	2	3	4	5	6	7	8	9	10	11	12	13	14	15	16	17
Ground	A	H	A	H	A	H	A	H	H	A	H	A	H	A	H	A	H
Result	W	L	D	L	L	L	W	W	D	L	D	L	L	W	L		
Position																	

Updated to match(es) played on 22 December 2024. Source:
A = Away; H = Home; W = Win; D = Draw; L = Loss

==== Matches ====
The league schedule was released on 7 July 2024.

10 August 2024 1	Mafra	0–1	Paços de Ferreira

18 August 2024 2	Paços de Ferreira	1–2	Marítimo	Paços de Ferreira
				Stadium: Estádio da Mata Real

24 August 2024 3	Leixões	3–3	Paços de Ferreira

1 September 2024 4	Paços de Ferreira	1–3	Penafiel	Paços de Ferreira
				Stadium: Estádio da Mata Real

16 September 2024 5	Feirense	2–0	Paços de Ferreira

28 September 2024 6	Paços de Ferreira	0–3	Benfica B	Paços de Ferreira
				Stadium: Estádio da Mata Real

5 October 2024 7	Oliveirense	0–2	Paços de Ferreira

13 October 2024 8	Paços de Ferreira	1–0	Torreense	Paços de Ferreira
				Stadium: Estádio da Mata Real

25 October 2024 9	Paços de Ferreira	1–1	Vizela	Paços de Ferreira
				Stadium: Estádio da Mata Real

2 November 2024 10	Chaves	2–1	Paços de Ferreira

10 November 2024 11	Paços de Ferreira	2–2	Porto B	Paços de Ferreira
				Stadium: Estádio da Mata Real

1 December 2024 12	Tondela	2–1	Paços de Ferreira	Tondela
14:00 UTC+0				Stadium: Estádio João Cardoso

8 December 2024 13	Paços de Ferreira	0–1	Portimonense	Paços de Ferreira
				Stadium: Estádio da Mata Real

14 December 2024 14	União de Leiria	0–1	Paços de Ferreira	Leiria
11:00 UTC+0				Stadium: Estádio Dr. Magalhães Pessoa

22 December 2024 15	Paços de Ferreira	1–3	Alverca	Paços de Ferreira
				Stadium: Estádio da Mata Real

5 January 2025 17	Paços de Ferreira	v	Académico de Viseu	Paços de Ferreira
18:00 UTC+0				Stadium: Estádio da Mata Real

=== Taça de Portugal ===
22 September 2024 Second round	Peniche	0–2	Paços de Ferreira
11:00 UTC+1

19 October 2024 Third round	Paços de Ferreira	1–3	Vitória de Guimarães	Paços de Ferreira
16:15 UTC+1				Stadium: Estádio da Mata Real
