= Kamiel Van de Perre =

Belgian footballer (born 2004

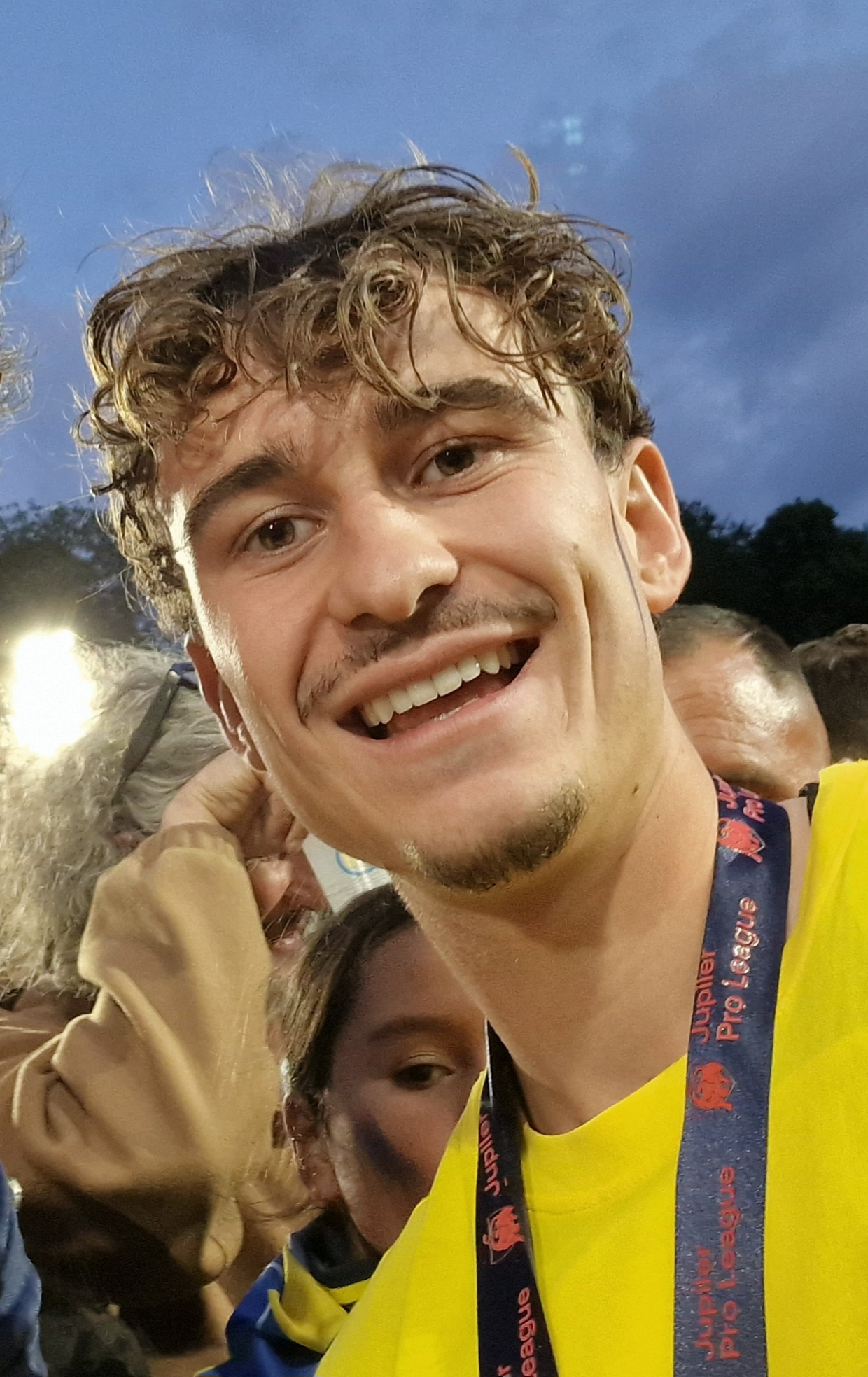
- Van De Perre with Union SG in 2025

Personal information
- Date of birth: 12 February 2004 (age 22)
- Place of birth: Turnhout, Belgium
- Height: 1.81 m (5 ft 11 in)
- Position: Midfielder

Team information
- Current team: Union SG
- Number: 6

Youth career
- –2015: Lierse SK
- 2015–2022: KRC Genk

Senior career*
Years	Team	Apps	(Gls)
2022–2024	Jong Genk	51	(0)
2024–	Union SG	62	(2)

International career^{‡}
2019	Belgium U16	6	(0)
2020	Belgium U17	2	(0)
2021–2022	Belgium U18	12	(0)
2025–	Belgium U21	8	(0)
- * Club domestic league appearances and goals as of 25 October 2026 ‡ National team caps and goals as of 15:35, 18 November 2026 (UTC)

Kamiel Van de Perre (born 12 February 2004) is a Belgian professional footballer who plays as a midfielder for Belgian Pro League club Union SG.

== Early life ==
Van de Perre was born on 12 February 2004. Born in Turnhout, Belgium, he is a native of the city.

== Club career ==
As a youth player, Van de Perre joined the youth academy of Lierse SK. In 2022, he joined the youth academy of Jong Genk and was promoted to the club's reserve team in 2024, where he made fifty-one league appearances and scored zero goals. On 14 August 2022, he debuted for them during a 4–1 home win over Lierse SK in the league. Belgian newspaper wrote that he was a "key player in the U23s in the Challenger Pro League" while playing for them.

Ahead of the 2024–25 season, he signed for Union SG, helping the club win the league title. On 30 October 2024, he made his first start for them during a 3–0 away win over KAS Eupen in the Belgian Cup.

== Career statistics ==
As of match played 25 October 2026

Appearances and goals by club, season and competition
Club	Season	League			Belgian Cup		Europe		Other		Total	
Club	Season	Division	Apps	Goals	Apps	Goals	Apps	Goals	Apps	Goals	Apps	Goals
Jong Genk	2022–23	Challenger Pro League	25	0	—		—		—		25	0
Jong Genk	2023–24	Challenger Pro League	26	0	—		—		—		26	0
Jong Genk	Total		51	0	—		—		—		51	0
Union SG	2024–25	Belgian Pro League	23	0	1	0	5 (Note: Appearances in UEFA Europa League)	0	—		29	0
Union SG	2025–26	Belgian Pro League	30	0	6	1	8 (Note: Appearances in UEFA Champions League)	0	1 (Note: Appearance in Belgian Super Cup)	0	45	1
Union SG	2026–27	Belgian Pro League	9	1	1	1	4 (Note: Two appearances in UEFA Champions League, two appearances in UEFA Europa League)	0	1	0	15	2
Union SG	Total		62	1	8	2	17	0	2	0	89	3
Career total			113	1	8	2	17	0	2	0	140	3

== Honours ==
Union SG

- Belgian Pro League: 2024–25
- Belgian Cup: 2025–26
