= Kevin Rodríguez (footballer, born 2000) =

Ecuadorian footballer

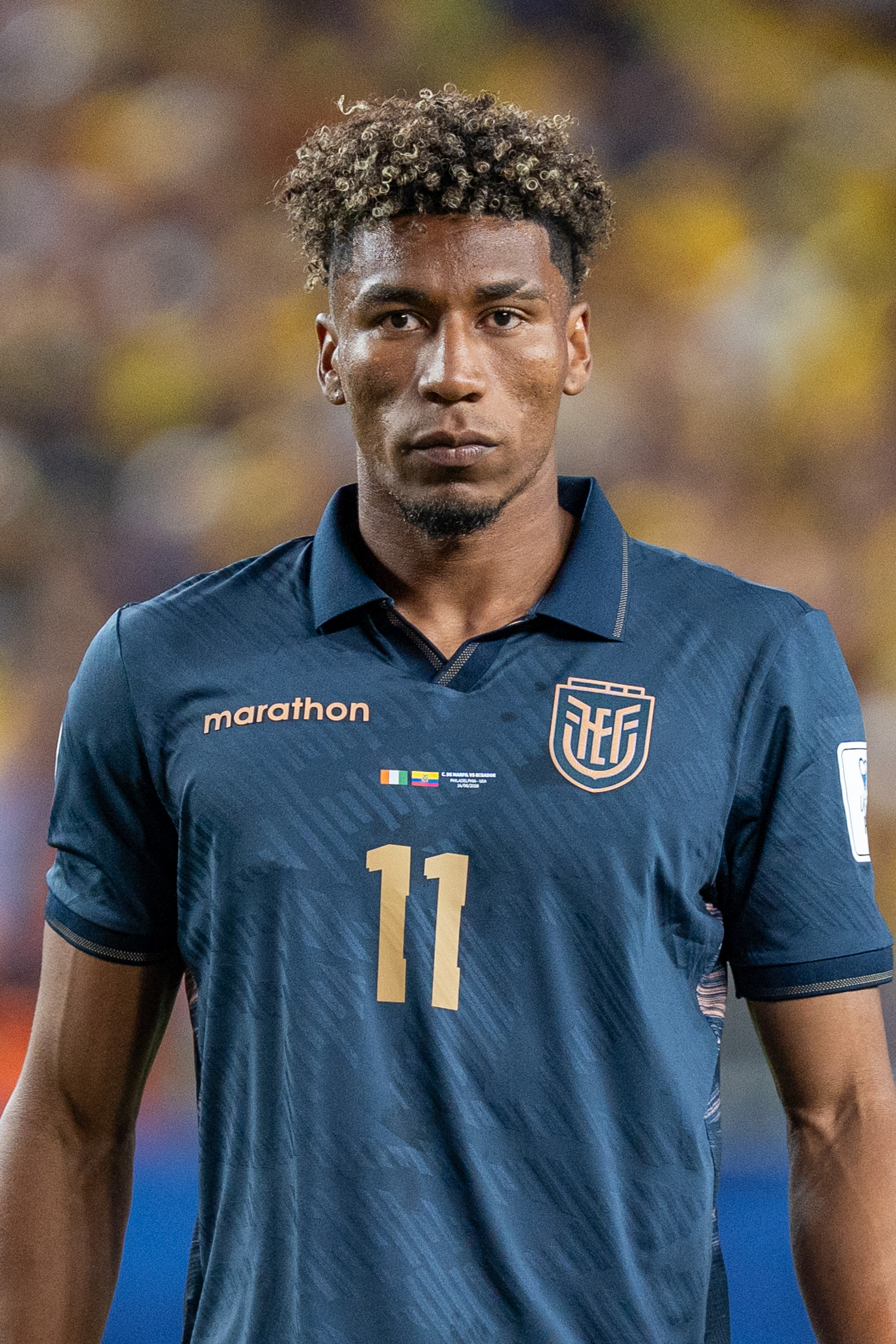
- Rodríguez with Ecuador in 2026

Personal information
- Full name: Kevin José Rodríguez Cortez
- Date of birth: 4 March 2000 (age 26)
- Place of birth: Ibarra, Ecuador
- Height: 1.90 m (6 ft 3 in)
- Position: Forward

Team information
- Current team: Union SG
- Number: 13

Youth career
- 2013–2017: Imbabura

Senior career*
Years	Team	Apps	(Gls)
2017–2022	Imbabura	67	(25)
2023	Independiente del Valle	16	(4)
2023–	Union Saint-Gilloise	75	(15)

International career^{‡}
2022–	Ecuador	35	(2)
- * Club domestic league appearances and goals as of 25 October 2026 ‡ National team caps and goals as of 1 July 2026

Kevin José Rodríguez Cortez (born 4 March 2000) is an Ecuadorian professional footballer who plays as a forward for Belgian Pro League club Royale Union Saint-Gilloise and the Ecuador national team.

== Club career ==
=== Imbabura ===
Born in Ibarra, Rodríguez joined hometown side Imbabura at the age of 13. He progressed through the youth setup until making his first team debut in 2017, featuring in two matches as his club was relegated from the Serie B.

Rodríguez started to feature more regularly in 2018, scoring seven times in the national stage of the Segunda Categoria. After scoring 11 goals overall during the 2019 season, he only scored once in five matches in 2020. In 2021, he only scored twice as his side returned to the second level.

Rodríguez became a regular starter for Imbabura in the 2022 Serie B, scoring ten times as his side finished fifth. In the 2022 Copa Ecuador, he notably scored the winner to knock out LDU Quito in the round of 16.

=== Independiente del Valle ===
On 2 December 2022, Independiente del Valle announced the signing of Rodríguez.

=== Union Saint-Gilloise ===
On 1 September 2023, Belgian Pro League club Union Saint-Gilloise announced the signing of Rodríguez on a four-year deal, with an option for an additional year. Rodríguez made his debut as a substitute in Union's opening UEFA Europa League group game against Toulouse on 21 September 2023, which Union drew 1–1. Later that year, on 12 November, he scored his first goals by netting a brace in a 3–0 win over Kortrijk.

== International career ==
Rodríguez was called up to the Ecuador national team for the first time in November 2022, as part of a preparation match against Iraq ahead of the 2022 FIFA World Cup later that month. He made his debut in the match, which finished as a 0–0 draw, coming on as a substitute in the 63rd minute for José Cifuentes. Two days later, he was included by coach Gustavo Alfaro in Ecuador's squad for the World Cup.

Rodríguez was named in the Ecuadorian squad for the 2022 FIFA World Cup. On 12 October 2023, he scored his first international goal – a 96th-minute winner against Bolivia in a 2026 FIFA World Cup qualifier. He was called up to the final 26-man Ecuador squad for the 2024 Copa América. On 31 May 2026, he was selected in Ecuador's squad for the 2026 FIFA World Cup.

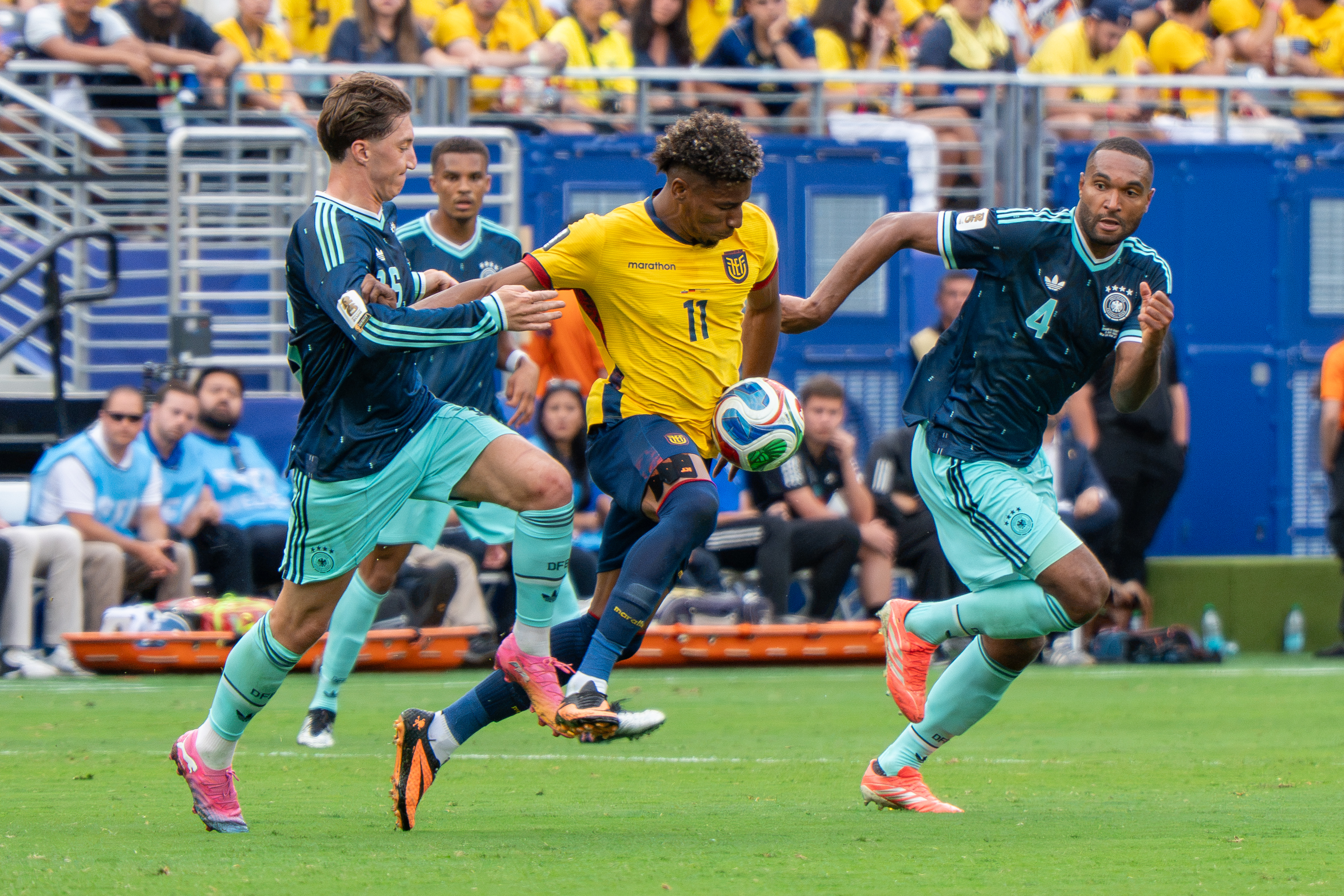
Rodriguez (centered) during Ecuador v Germany at the 2026 FIFA World Cup

== Career statistics ==
=== Club ===
As of match played 25 October 2026

Appearances and goals by club, season and competition
Club	Season	League			National cup (Note: Includes Copa Ecuador, Belgian Cup)		Continental		Other		Total	
Club	Season	Division	Apps	Goals	Apps	Goals	Apps	Goals	Apps	Goals	Apps	Goals
Imbabura	2017	Ecuadorian Serie B	2	0	—		—		—		2	0
Imbabura	2018	Ecuadorian Segunda Categoría	9	7	—		—		9 (Note: Appearances in Campeonato Provincial de Segunda Categoría de Imbabura)	1	18	8
Imbabura	2019	Ecuadorian Segunda Categoría	12	5	1	0	—		10	6	23	11
Imbabura	2020	Ecuadorian Segunda Categoría	4	1	—		—		1	0	5	1
Imbabura	2021	Ecuadorian Segunda Categoría	11	2	—		—		2	0	13	2
Imbabura	2022	Ecuadorian Serie B	29	10	4	2	—		—		33	12
Imbabura	Total		67	25	5	2	—		22	7	94	34
Independiente del Valle	2023	LigaPro Serie A	16	4	0	0	6 (Note: Appearances in Copa Libertadores)	1	3 (Note: One appearance in Supercopa Ecuador, two appearances in Recopa Sudamericana)	0	25	5
Union SG	2023–24	Belgian Pro League	19	3	4	1	6 (Note: Appearances in UEFA Europa League)	0	—		29	4
Union SG	2024–25	Belgian Pro League	22	1	2	0	12 (Note: Two appearances in UEFA Champions League, ten appearances in UEFA Europa League)	0	0	0	36	1
Union SG	2025–26	Belgian Pro League	31	10	4	4	6 (Note: Appearances in UEFA Champions League)	0	1 (Note: Appearance in Belgian Super Cup)	0	41	14
Union SG	2026–27	Belgian Pro League	3	1	0	0	3 (Note: One appearance in UEFA Champions League, two appearances in UEFA Europa League)	0	0	0	6	1
Union SG	Total		75	15	10	5	27	0	1	0	113	20
Career total			158	42	15	7	33	1	22	7	232	57

=== International ===
As of match played 30 June 2026

Appearances and goals by national team and year
National team	Year	Apps	Goals
Ecuador	2022	3	0
Ecuador	2023	8	1
Ecuador	2024	10	1
Ecuador	2025	6	0
Ecuador	2026	8	0
Total		35	2

Scores and results list Ecuador's goal tally first.

List of international goals scored by Kevin Rodríguez
No.	Date	Venue	Opponent	Score	Result	Competition
1	12 October 2023	Estadio Hernando Siles, La Paz, Bolivia	Bolivia	2–1	2–1	2026 FIFA World Cup qualification
2	4 July 2024	NRG Stadium, Houston, United States	Argentina	1–1	1–1 (2–4 p)	2024 Copa América

== Honours ==
Independiente del Valle

- Supercopa Ecuador: 2023
- Recopa Sudamericana: 2023

Union SG

- Belgian Pro League: 2024–25
- Belgian Cup: 2023–24, 2025–26
- Belgian Super Cup: 2024
