= Ibrahim Kanaté =

Malian footballer (born 2006)

Personal information
- Date of birth: 23 October 2006 (age 20)
- Height: 1.72 m (5 ft 7 1/2 in)
- Position: Left winger

Team information
- Current team: 1. FC Kaiserslautern; (on loan from Anderlecht)
- Number: 11

Youth career
- –2023: ASEC Mimosas

Senior career*
Years	Team	Apps	(Gls)
2023–2025	Afrique Football Élite		
2025–	RSCA Futures	13	(3)
2025–	Anderlecht	20	(2)
2026–	→ 1. FC Kaiserslautern (loan)	2	(0)

International career^{‡}
2023	Mali U17	12	(2)
2025–	Mali U23	4	(0)
Medal record
Men's football
Representing Mali
FIFA U-17 World Cup
Third place	2023 Indonesia
- * Club domestic league appearances and goals as of 11:55, 25 August 2026 (UTC) ‡ National team caps and goals as of 23:13, 14 June 2025 (UTC)

Ibrahim Kanaté (born 23 October 2006) is a Malian professional footballer who plays as a left winger for 2. Bundesliga club 1. FC Kaiserslautern, on loan from Belgian Pro League club Anderlecht.

== Club career ==
He trained at ASEC Mimosas before joining Afrique Football Élite of the Malian Première Division for whom he featured in 2023. With AFE he reached the final of the 2024 Malian Cup.

He signed for Anderlecht in January 2025 for a reported €1.8 million, to link up initially with the RSCA Futures.

Kanaté made his first appearance for Anderlecht's senior team on 18 May 2025 in a game against Club Brugge. On 23 November 2025, he scored his first goal for Anderlecht, an added-time winner in a 1–0 victory over RAAL La Louvière, after coming on as a substitute in the 87th minute.

On 24 June 2026, Kanaté joined 1. FC Kaiserslautern in German 2. Bundesliga on loan.

== International career ==
Kanaté featured for the Mali national under-17 football team which finished in third place at the 2023 FIFA U-17 World Cup, where he scored two goals in seven matches. He also played as Mali U17 reached the semi-finals of the 2023 U-17 Africa Cup of Nations.

== Career statistics ==
As of match played 21 August 2026

Appearances and goals by club, season and competition
Club	Season	League			National cup (Note: Includes Belgian Cup, DFB-Pokal)		Europe		Other		Total	
Club	Season	Division	Apps	Goals	Apps	Goals	Apps	Goals	Apps	Goals	Apps	Goals
RSCA Futures	2024–25	Challenger Pro League	6	1	—		—		—		6	1
RSCA Futures	2025–26	Challenger Pro League	7	2	—		—		—		7	2
RSCA Futures	Total		13	3	—		—		—		13	3
Anderlecht	2024–25	Belgian Pro League	1	0	—		—		—		1	0
Anderlecht	2025–26	Belgian Pro League	19	2	4	1	3 (Note: Two appearances in UEFA Europa League, one appearance in UEFA Conference League)	0	—		26	3
Anderlecht	Total		20	2	4	1	3	0	—		27	3
1. FC Kaiserslautern (loan)	2026–27	2. Bundesliga	2	0	1	1	—		—		3	1
Career total			35	5	5	2	3	0	0	0	44	7
