= Fedde Leysen =

Belgian footballer

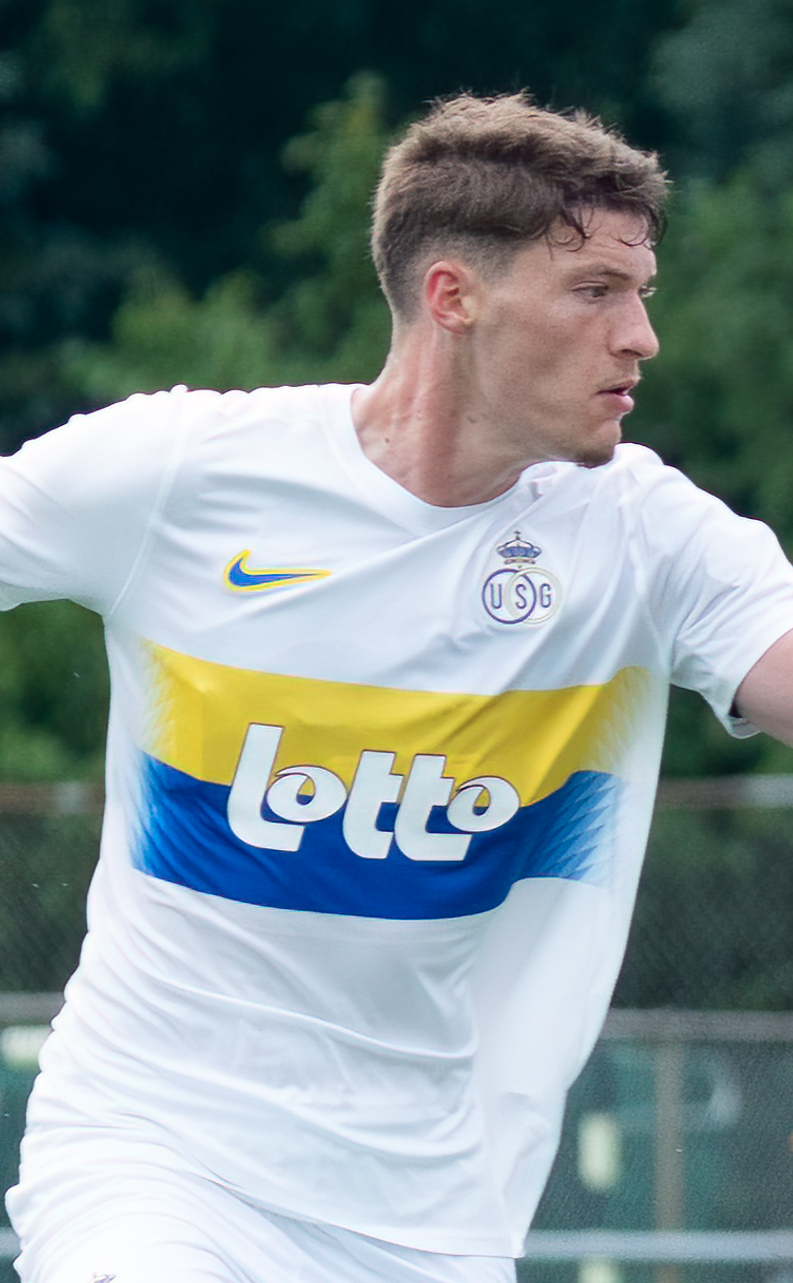
- Leysen in 2024

Personal information
- Date of birth: 9 July 2003 (age 23)
- Place of birth: Geel, Belgium
- Height: 1.87 m (6 ft 2 in)
- Position: Defender

Team information
- Current team: Sassuolo (on loan from Union SG)
- Number: 16

Senior career*
Years	Team	Apps	(Gls)
2020–2023	Jong PSV	54	(5)
2023–	Union SG	61	(1)
2026–	→ Sassuolo (loan)	3	(0)

International career
2019	Belgium U16	3	(0)
2019	Belgium U17	1	(0)
2021–2022	Belgium U19	6	(0)
2022	Belgium U20	1	(0)
2023–2024	Belgium U21	2	(0)
- * Club domestic league appearances and goals as of 6 September 2026

Fedde Leysen (born 9 July 2003) is a Belgian professional footballer who plays as a defender for Serie A club Sassuolo, on loan from Belgian Pro League club Union SG.

== Club career ==
Born in Geel, Leysen started his career with Jong PSV. He played 54 games in three seasons for Jong PSV in the Eerste Divisie.

On 13 June 2023, Belgian side Union SG confirmed the signing of Leysen on a three-year deal until 2026.

On 21 August 2026, Leysen moved to Sassuolo in Italy on loan with a conditional obligation to buy.

== International career ==
Leysen was a Belgium youth international.

== Career statistics ==
As of match played 15 August 2026

Appearances and goals by club, season and competition
Club	Season	League			National cup (Note: Includes Belgian Cup)		Europe		Other		Total	
Club	Season	Division	Apps	Goals	Apps	Goals	Apps	Goals	Apps	Goals	Apps	Goals
Jong PSV	2020–21	Eerste Divisie	2	0	—		—		—		2	0
Jong PSV	2021–22	Eerste Divisie	20	3	—		—		—		20	3
Jong PSV	2022–23	Eerste Divisie	32	2	—		—		—		32	2
Jong PSV	Total		54	5	—		—		—		54	5
Union SG	2023–24	Belgian Pro League	4	0	3	0	2 (Note: Appearances in UEFA Europa League)	0	—		9	0
Union SG	2024–25	Belgian Pro League	28	0	1	0	6 (Note: One appearance in UEFA Champions League, five appearances in UEFA Europa League)	0	1 (Note: Appearance in Belgian Super Cup)	0	36	0
Union SG	2025–26	Belgian Pro League	27	1	4	0	6 (Note: Appearances in UEFA Champions League)	0	1	0	38	1
Union SG	2026–27	Belgian Pro League	2	0	0	0	0	0	—		2	0
Union SG	Total		61	1	8	0	14	0	2	0	85	1
Career total			115	6	8	0	14	0	2	0	138	6

== Honours ==
Union SG

- Belgian Pro League: 2024–25
- Belgian Cup: 2023–24, 2025–26
