= Ousseynou Niang =

Senegalese footballer

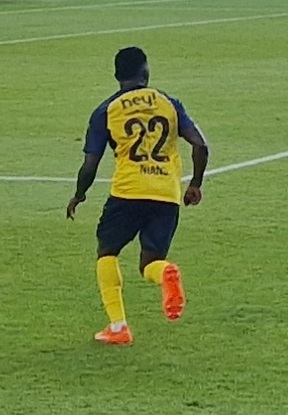
- Niang playing for Union SG in 2025

Personal information
- Date of birth: 12 October 2001 (age 25)
- Place of birth: Ziguinchor, Senegal
- Height: 1.68 m (5 ft 6 in)
- Position: Midfielder

Team information
- Current team: Zulte Waregem
- Number: 22

Youth career
- –2019: Diambars

Senior career*
Years	Team	Apps	(Gls)
2019–2022	Diambars		
2022–2023	Auda	15	(4)
2023–2024	Riga	33	(8)
2024	→ Riga II	3	(0)
2024–2026	Union SG	56	(4)
2026–	Zulte Waregem	2	(0)

International career^{‡}
2017–2019	Senegal U20	12	(1)
2022	Senegal U23	2	(0)
2019	Senegal	3	(1)
Medal record
Men's football
Representing Senegal
Africa Cup of Nations
Runner-up	2025 Morocco
- * Club domestic league appearances and goals as of 5 October 2026 ‡ National team caps and goals as of 5 October 2026

Ousseynou Niang (born 12 October 2001) is a Senegalese professional footballer who plays as a midfielder for Belgian Pro League club Zulte Waregem.

== Club career ==
Niang started playing football at the Senegalese youth academy Diambars where he went on to play for the first team before moving to the Latvian club Auda in the spring of 2022.

At the end of 2023, Niang signed for Riga, the team would go on to finish the season as vice-champions and would qualify for the UEFA Conference League. Niang score his first European goal in a 1–0 victory over Śląsk Wrocław.

Niang joined Union Saint-Gilloise on 3 September 2024. On 31 July 2025, he extended his contract with Union Saint-Gilloise for 3 years.

On 3 September 2026, Niang moved to Zulte Waregem on a contract for two seasons, with an option for two more.

== Career statistics ==
As of match played 15 August 2026

Appearances and goals by club, season and competition
Club	Season	League			National cup (Note: Includes Latvian Cup, Belgian Cup)		Continental		Other		Total	
Club	Season	Division	Apps	Goals	Apps	Goals	Apps	Goals	Apps	Goals	Apps	Goals
Diambars	2021–22	Ligue 1	—		—		1 (Note: Appearance in CAF Confederation Cup)	0	—		1	0
Auda	2022	Latvian Higher League	15	4	4	0	—		—		19	4
Riga	2023	Latvian Higher League	13	3	—		—		—		13	3
Riga	2024	Latvian Higher League	20	5	2	1	2 (Note: Appearances in UEFA Conference League)	1	—		24	7
Riga	Total		48	12	6	1	2	1	—		56	14
Union SG	2024–25	Belgian Pro League	27	2	2	0	10 (Note: Appearances in UEFA Europa League)	0	—		39	2
Union SG	2025–26	Belgian Pro League	27	2	2	0	7 (Note: Appearances in UEFA Champions League)	0	1 (Note: Appearance in Belgian Super Cup)	0	37	2
Union SG	2026–27	Belgian Pro League	2	0	0	0	2 (Note: Two appearances in UEFA Champions League)	0	1	0	5	0
Union SG	Total		56	4	4	0	19	0	2	0	85	4
Career total			104	16	10	1	22	1	2	0	138	18

== Honours ==
Union SG

- Belgian Pro League: 2024–25
- Belgian Cup: 2025–26
