= Ross Sykes =

English footballer

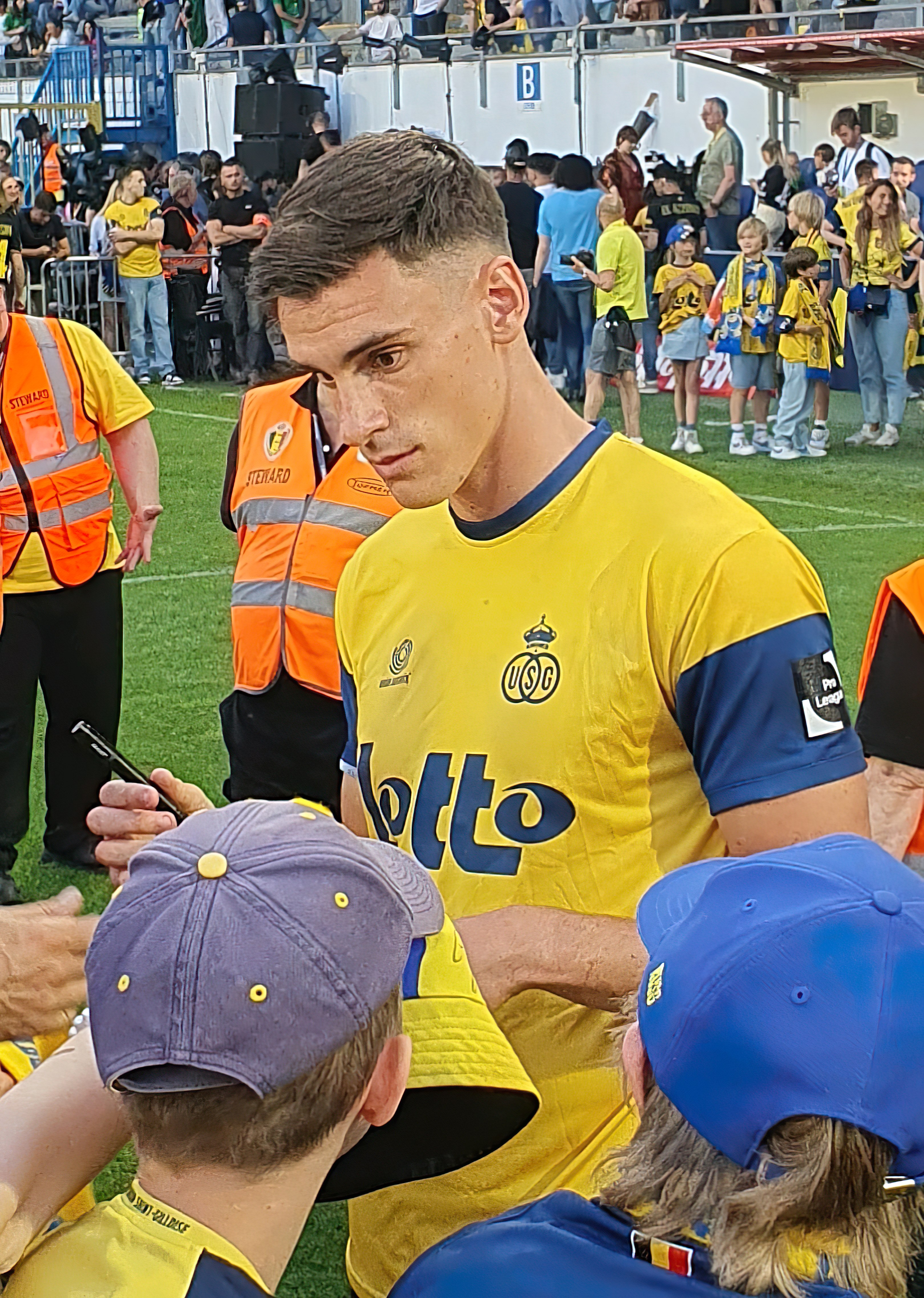
- Sykes in 2023

Personal information
- Full name: Ross James Sykes
- Date of birth: 26 March 1999 (age 27)
- Place of birth: Burnley, England
- Height: 1.96 m (6 ft 5 in)
- Position: Defender

Team information
- Current team: Union SG
- Number: 26

Youth career
- 2010–2012: Burnley
- 2012–2016: Accrington Stanley

Senior career*
Years	Team	Apps	(Gls)
2016–2022	Accrington Stanley	101	(8)
2017–2018	→ Southport (loan)	6	(0)
2022–	Union Saint-Gilloise	100	(13)
- * Club domestic league appearances and goals as of 25 October 2026

Ross James Sykes (born 26 March 1999) is an English professional footballer who plays as a defender for Belgian Pro League club Union SG.

== Career ==
Sykes was born in Burnley, Lancashire and attended Unity College in the town. He started his career with local side Burnley, playing for their youth team between the ages of eleven and thirteen before being released. After nearly giving up the game he was persuaded to go on trial at Accrington Stanley by his mother and was later signed up by the club. In May 2016, he signed his first professional contract on a two-year deal, despite being a first-year scholar. He made his senior debut for the club in August 2016, starting in the 3–0 defeat to Crewe Alexandra in EFL Trophy group-stage. Accrington exercised a contractual option at the end of the 2017–18 season to retain him.

On 23 June 2022, Sykes joined Belgian First Division A side Union SG for an undisclosed fee. On 28 February 2024, he scored a goal in stoppage time of 2–0 victory over Club Brugge in the Belgian Cup semi-final second leg, which granted Union SG a 3–2 win on aggregate and qualification to their first final since 1914.

== Career statistics ==
As of match played 25 October 2026

Appearances and goals by club, season and competition
Club	Season	League			National cup (Note: Includes FA Cup, Belgian Cup)		League cup (Note: Includes EFL Cup)		Europe		Other		Total	
Club	Season	Division	Apps	Goals	Apps	Goals	Apps	Goals	Apps	Goals	Apps	Goals	Apps	Goals
Accrington Stanley	2016–17	League Two	0	0	0	0	0	0	—		3 (Note: Appearances in EFL Trophy)	0	3	0
Accrington Stanley	2017–18	League Two	2	0	0	0	0	0	—		3	0	5	0
Accrington Stanley	2018–19	League One	20	3	2	0	0	0	—		4	1	26	4
Accrington Stanley	2019–20	League One	31	1	1	0	1	0	—		6	2	39	3
Accrington Stanley	2020–21	League One	9	1	1	0	1	0	—		3	0	14	1
Accrington Stanley	2021–22	League One	39	3	1	0	2	0	—		2	0	44	3
Accrington Stanley	Total		101	8	5	0	4	0	0	0	21	3	131	11
Southport (loan)	2017–18	National League North	6	0	0	0	—		—		0	0	6	0
Union Saint-Gilloise	2022–23	Belgian Pro League	20	2	1	0	—		5 (Note: Two appearances in UEFA Champions League, three appearances in UEFA Europa League)	0	—		26	2
Union Saint-Gilloise	2023–24	Belgian Pro League	24	4	6	1	—		4 (Note: One appearance in UEFA Europa League, three appearances in UEFA Europa Conference League)	0	—		34	5
Union Saint-Gilloise	2024–25	Belgian Pro League	23	2	3	0	—		8 (Note: Appearances in UEFA Europa League)	1	—		34	3
Union Saint-Gilloise	2025–26	Belgian Pro League	32	5	6	1	—		6 (Note: Appearances in UEFA Champions League)	1	—		44	7
Union Saint-Gilloise	2026–27	Belgian Pro League	1	0	0	0	—		1	0	1 (Note: Appearance in Belgian Super Cup)	0	3	0
Union Saint-Gilloise	Total		100	13	16	2	—		24	2	1	0	141	17
Career total			207	21	21	2	4	0	24	2	22	3	278	28

== Honours ==
Union SG

- Belgian Pro League: 2024–25
- Belgian Cup: 2023–24, 2025–26
