= 2024–25 Belgian Cup =

Tournament details
- Country: Belgium
- Dates: 28 July 2024 – 4 May 2025
- Teams: 296

Final positions
- Champions: Club Brugge (12th cup)
- Runners-up: Anderlecht

The 2024–25 Belgian Cup, called the Croky Cup for sponsorship reasons, was the 70th season of Belgium's annual football cup competition. The competition began on 28 July 2024. The winners of the competition qualified for the 2025–26 UEFA Europa League.

Royale Union Saint-Gilloise were the defending champions.

Match times up to 27 October 2024 and from 30 March 2025 are CEST (UTC+2). Times on interim ("winter") days are CET (UTC+1).

== Competition format ==
The competition consists of eleven proper rounds. All rounds are single-match elimination rounds. When tied after 90 minutes in the first four rounds, penalties will be taken immediately. From round five, when tied after 90 minutes first an extra time period of 30 minutes will be played, then penalties are to be taken if still necessary.

== Round and draw dates ==
Round	Draw date	Match dates
First Round	28 June 2024	27–28 July 2024
Second Round	28 June 2024	3–4 August 2024
Third Round	28 June 2024	10–11 August 2024
Fourth Round	28 June 2024	17–18 August 2024
Fifth Round	28 June 2024	24–25 August 2024
Sixth Round	28 June 2024	7–8 September 2024
Seventh Round	9 September 2024	29-31 October 2024
Eighth Round	31 October 2024	3-5 December 2024
Quarter-finals	5 December 2024	7-9 January 2025
Semi-finals	5 December 2024	14-16 January 2025
Semi-finals	5 December 2024	5-6 February 2025
Final	n/a	4 May 2025

== First round ==
This round of matches were played on 28 July 2024.

For this initial round, teams were split into ten groups according to geolocation.

Number of teams per tier still in competition
Pro League	Challenger Pro League	Division 1	Division 2	Division 3	Provincial Leagues	Total
16 / 16	13 / 13	21 / 21	44 / 44	62 / 62	140 / 140	296 / 296

Tie	Home team (tier)	Score	Away team (tier)
Group 1
1	Mol	0–1	Tisselt
2	Lint	1–5	Hooikt
3	Retie	5–0	Ekeren
4	Kontich	2–1	Zwaneven
5	Brasschaat	1–3	Punt-Larum
6	Berlaar-Heikant	1–2	Niewmoer
7	Gooreind	1–2	Schelle Sport
8	Hoboken	6–0	BO Beerzel
9	Antonia	0–1	Witgoor Sport
Group 2
10	Perk	1–3	Linden
11	Landen	2–0	Wambeek-Ternat
12	Huldenberg	3–1	Wolvertem-Merchtem
13	Aarschot	0–2	Wijgmal
14	Herent	0–0 (4–2 p)	Diest
15	Londerzeel	1–1 (1–3 p)	Liedekerke
16	Bertem-Leefdaal	0–1	Kraainem
17	Pepingen-Halle	2–3	Tervuren-Duisburg
Group 3
18	Ham United	0–5	Bree-Beek
19	Unico Tongeren	2–1	Peer
20	Vlijtingen	4–3	Elen
21	Uikhoven	0–2	Diepenbeek
22	Linkhout	0–4	Weerstand-Koersel
23	Weerstand-Koersel II	2–4	Veldwezelt
24	Eksel	2–5	Turkse Rangers
Group 4
25	Aalter	2–2 (4–2 p)	Denderhoutem
26	Hedes	0–3	Borsbeke
27	Sparta Wortegem	1–4	Kokerij-Meldert II
28	Sottegem	1–1 (5–4 p)	Zwijnaarde
29	Heikant Zele	2–1	Sparta Waasmunster
30	Munkzwalm	0–3	Maldegem
31	Knesselare	3–1	Vrasene
32	Poesele	0–1	Berlare
33	Haasdonk	4–3	S.K. Beveren
Group 5
34	Ingooigem	1–2	Racing Waregem II
35	Beveren-Leie	1–3	Bredene
36	Boezinge	7–0	Sparta Heestert
37	Zedelgem	10–0	Westrozebeke
38	Racing Waregem	3–1	Ardooie
39	Rumbeke	0–0 (4–2 p)	Zwevegem Sport
40	Varsenare	2–1	Wevelgem City

Tie	Home team (tier)	Score	Away team (tier)
Group 6
41	Cuesmes	1–7	Moen
42	Mons II	0–0 (4–5 p)	Houdinois
43	Fontainoise	2–4	Casteau
44	Estaimbourg	0–5	Peruwelz
45	Frasnoise	4–3	Courcelloise
46	Antoinien	3–5	Gosselies Sport
47	Isieroise	0–0 (3–2 p)	Paturageois
Group 7
48	Saintoise	4–1	Soignies Sport
49	Stephanois	0–2	Lasne Ohain
50	Waterloo	1–3	Ophain
51	Villers La Ville	3–4	Etterbeek
52	Auderghem	2–2 (5–4 p)	Léopold
53	Kosova Schaerbeek	1–0	Beauvechain
Group 8
54	Nismes	0–0 (4–5 p)	Dinantaise
55	Arquet	0–2	Meux II
56	Gembloux	2–4	Condruzien
57	Werpionnais	0–1	Grand-Leez
58	Chevetogne	1–3	Evelette-Jallet
Group 9
59	Bouillon	3–0	Aye
60	Nassogne	3–2	Chaumont
61	Corbion	0–6	Longlier
62	Habaysienne	0–2	Wallonia Libin
63	Houffaloise	0–0 (5–3 p)	Assenois
Group 10
64	Elsautoise II	3–1	Jalhaytois
65	Grun-Weiss Amel	0–0 (3–2 p)	Aywaille II
66	Vyle-Tharoul	3–1	Sart Tilman
67	Rapid Oudler	2–5	Ster-Francorchamps
68	Limbourg	1–1 (3–4 p)	Lambermont-Rechain
69	Aubel II	0–2	Flemalloise
70	Juprelle	1–3	Warsage

== Second round ==
This was played on 4 August 2024 between the 70 winning clubs from the first round who were joined by the 62 clubs from Division 3.

The match between Landen and Aubel originally ended 0–2 but was converted into a forfeit victory due to a breach of the substitution rules from Aubel's team.

Number of teams per tier still in competition
Pro League	Challenger Pro League	Division 1	Division 2	Division 3	Provincial Leagues	Total
16 / 16	13 / 13	21 / 21	44 / 44	62 / 62	70 / 140	226 / 296

Tie	Home team (tier)	Score	Away team (tier)
71	Landen	5–0	Aubel (5)
72	Herent	2–0	Waremmien (5)
73	Zwarte Leeuw (5)	4–0	Hoboken
74	Nijlen (5)	2–0	Liedekerke
75	City Pirates (5)	5–1	Hooikt
76	Achel (5)	3–1	Wijgmal
77	St-Lenaarts (5)	2–0	Niewmoer
78	Tilffois (5)	2–2 (2–3 p)	Kontich
79	Rotselaar (5)	4–1	Punt-Larum
80	Retie	1–3	Schoonbeek-Beverst (5)
81	Kraainem	4–1	De Kempen (5)
82	Bevel (5)	0–2	Linden
83	Witgoor Sport	2–1	Richelle (5)
84	Turnhout (5)	2–2 (10–11 p)	Sporting Tisselt
85	Schelle Sport	0–1	Zepperen-Brustem (5)
86	Geel (5)	4–0	Huldenberg
87	Erpe-Mere (5)	0–0 (5–3 p)	Vlijtingen
88	Sporting Bruxelles (5)	1–0	Diepenbeek
89	Perwez (5)	1–2	Tervuren-Duisburg
90	Sottegem	0–3	Londerzeel (5)
91	Tongeren	1–0	Evere (5)
92	Braine (5)	3–3 (5–4 p)	Borsbeke
93	Heikant Zele	1–2	Jodoigne (5)
94	Meldert	0–3	Aalter
95	Bree Beek	0–5	Tempo Overijse (5)
96	Turkse Rangers	4–1	Veldwezelt
97	Weerstand-Koersel	2–2 (5–4 p)	Rebecq (5)
98	Casteau	1–4	Bredene
99	Avanti Stekene (5)	1–1 (5–4 p)	Peruwelz
100	Elene-Grotenberge (5)	1–0	Boezinge
101	Maldegem	2–3	St-Denijs Sport (5)
102	Zedelgem	1–0	Wielsbeke (5)
103	Wetteren (5)	4–0	Houdinois

Tie	Home team (tier)	Score	Away team (tier)
104	Racing Waregem II	0–3	Jong Lede (5)
105	Blankenberge (5)	1–0	Racing Waregem
106	Moen	1–3	Drongen (5)
107	Berlare	3–0	Club Lauwe (5)
108	Knesselare	0–3	Diksmuide-Oostende (5)
109	Sparta Petegem (4)	3–0	Haasdonk
110	Varsenare	1–3	Eendracht Wervik (5)
111	Mandel United (5)	7–0	Frasnoise
112	Rumbeke	1–2	Hamme (5)
113	Kalken (5)	4–1	Gosselies Sport
114	Auderghem	1–2	Ophain
115	Etterbeek	2–2 (3–4 p)	Aische (5)
116	Kosova Scharbeek	1–1 (5–4 p)	Flenu (5)
117	Saintoise	1–1 (2–4 p)	Arquet (5)
118	Evelette-Jallet	1–2	Beloeil (5)
119	Lasne Ohain	2–1	Pont-A-Celles-Buzet (5)
120	Monceau (5)	3–0	Dinantaise
121	Ciney (5)	4–3	Meux II
122	Condruzien	1–2	St-Ghislain (5)
123	Grand-Leez	2–1	Loyers (5)
124	Isieroise	0–4	Biesme (5)
125	Houffaloise	2–7	Elsautoise (5)
126	Warsage	1–2	Harre-Manhay (5)
127	Bouillon	1–2	Eupen 1963 (5)
128	Oppagne-Weris (5)	0–0 (4–1 p)	Ster-Francorchamps
129	Mormont (5)	2–1	Longlier
130	Nassogne	0–3	Marloie (5)
131	Gouvy (5)	2–1	Lambermont-Rechain
132	Sprimont (5)	5–1	Grun-Weiss Amel
133	Wallonia Libin	1–2	Geer (5)
134	Hamoir (5)	2–1	Vyle-Tharoul
135	Meix-dt-Virton (5)	7–1	Elsautoise II
136	Libramont (5)	2–2 (3–4 p)	Flemalloise

== Third round ==
This round was played on 11 August 2024 and featured the 66 teams that won in the second round and the 44 teams from the Division 2.

Number of teams per tier still in competition
Pro League	Challenger Pro League	Division 1	Division 2	Division 3	Provincial Leagues	Total
16 / 16	13 / 13	21 / 21	44 / 44	45 / 62	21 / 140	160 / 296

Tie	Home team (tier)	Score	Away team (tier)
137	Eendracht Wervik (5)	0–0 (4–5 p)	Meux (4)
138	Rupel Boom (4)	2–1	Aalter
139	Turkse Rangers	3–2	Oudenaarde (4)
140	Hamme (5)	2–0	Gullgem (4)
141	Meix-dt-Virton (5)	5–4	Gouvy (5)
142	Aywaille (4)	3–0	Erpe-Mere (5)
143	Kalken (5)	1–0	Olsa Brakel (4)
144	Houtvenne (4)	3–1	Hamoir (5)
145	Torhout (4)	0–1	Monceau (5)
146	Eupen 1963 (5)	2–1	Jette (4)
147	Verviers (4)	1–0	Zepperen-Brustem (5)
148	Westhoek (4)	2–0	St-Lenaarts (5)
149	Zelzate (4)	5–0	City Pirates (5)
150	Elsautoise (5)	2–1	St-Denijs Sport (5)
151	Achel (5)	0–1	Raeren-Eynatten (4)
152	Betekom	1–0	Verlaine (4)
153	Arquet (5)	0–2	Bredene
154	St-Ghislain (5)	1–3	Herent
155	Dikkelvenne (4)	3–0	Weerstand-Koersel
156	Zedelgem	1–2	Biesme (5)
157	Drongen	1–2	Sporting Bruxelles (5)
158	Termien (4)	3–2	Tervuren-Duisburg
159	Wezel (4)	1–1 (7–6 p)	Schoonbeek-Beverst (5)
160	Union Hutoise (4)	6–2	Aubel (5)
161	Geel (5)	2–0	Crossing Schaerbeek (4)
162	La Louviere Centre (4)	3–1	Avanti Stekene (5)
163	La Calamine (4)	1–0	Tempo Overijse (5)
164	Tongeren (4)	0–1	Kosova Scharbeek

Tie	Home team (tier)	Score	Away team (tier)
165	Onhaye (4)	3–0	Elene-Grotenberge (5)
166	Geer (5)	1–1 (5–4 p)	Oostkamp (4)
167	Londerzeel (5)	2–4	Berchem (4)
168	Linden	2–3	Mandel United (5)
169	Ganshoren (4)	3–3 (5–4 p)	Sprimont (5)
170	Ciney (5)	1–0	Witgoor Sport
171	Manage (4)	5–1	Aische (5)
172	Diegem (4)	4–0	Harre-Manhay (5)
173	Lille (4)	4–0	Sporting Tisselt
174	Hades (4)	1–1 (3–4 p)	Ophain
175	Acren-Lessines (4)	5–0	Mormont (5)
176	Flemalloise	0–5	Wetteren (5)
177	Racing Mechelen (4)	2–2 (4–1 p)	Kraainem
178	Kontich	1–2	Sparta Petegem (4)
179	Beloeil (5)	0–0 (16–15 p)	Lasne Ohain
180	Rotselaar (5)	1–0	Zwarte Leeuw (5)
181	Lebbeke (4)	2–3	Berlare
182	Harelbeke (4)	5–0	Jong Lede (5)
183	Diksmuide-Oostende (5)	2–1	Pelt (4)
184	Grand-Leez	1–1 (5–4 p)	Ostiches-Ath (4)
185	Oppagne-Weris (5)	0–3	Bocholt (4)
186	Nijlen (5)	6–1	Wellen (4)
187	Berg en Dal (4)	5–2	Jodoigne (5)
188	Tongeren	1–5	Habay la Neuve (4)
189	Roeselare (4)	1–1 (0–2 p)	Blankenberge (5)
190	Voorde-Appelterre (4)	3–0	Marloie (5)
191	Racing Gent (4)	2–1	Braine (5)

== Fourth round ==
This round was played on 18 August 2024 and featured the 55 winners from the previous round as well as the 21 clubs from the National Division 1.

Number of teams per tier still in competition
Pro League	Challenger Pro League	Division 1	Division 2	Division 3	Provincial Leagues	Total
16 / 16	13 / 13	21 / 21	29 / 44	19 / 62	7 / 140	105 / 296

Tie	Home team (tier)	Score	Away team (tier)
192	Lyra-Lierse Berlaar (3)	2–0	Herent (6)
193	Verviers (4)	2–3	Bredene (6)
194	Habay la Neuve (4)	0–2	Olympic Charleroi (3)
195	Diegem (4)	4–1	Manage (4)
196	Racing Mechelen (4)	1–0	Monceau (5)
197	Geel (5)	2–1	Wezel (4)
198	Heist (3)	0–0 (3–5 p)	Diksmuide-Oostende (5)
199	Voorde-Appelterre (4)	1–1 (4–3 p)	Berlare (6)
200	Onhaye (4)	3–1	Rotselaar (5)
201	Tienen (3)	1–2	Rupel Boom (4)
202	Berchem (4)	3–5	Binche (3)
203	Biesme (5)	3–0	Eupen 1963 (5)
204	Ophain (7)	0–1	Aywaille (4)
205	Tubize-Braine (3)	3–0	Meix-dt-Virton (5)
206	Hoogstraten (3)	0–1	Meux (4)
207	Stockay (3)	4–1	Beloeil (5)
208	Union Namur (3)	1–3	Houtvenne (4)
209	Sporting Bruxelles (5)	3–0	Grand-Leez (6)
210	Kosova Schaerbeek (6)	0–1	Turkse Rangers (6)
211	Dikkelvenne (4)	0–0 (5–3 p)	Mandel United (5)
212	Union Hutoise (4)	2–4	Berg en Dal (4)
213	Wetteren (5)	1–0	Tournai (3)
214	Kalken (5)	3–1	Virton (3)
215	Ninove (3)	5–0	Harelbeke (4)
216	Dessel (3)	3–2	Blankenberge (5)
217	Mons (3)	3–0	Bocholt (4)
218	Elsautoise (5)	1–0	Cappellen (3)
219	Lille (4)	1–2	Merelbeke (3)
220	Acren-Lessines (4)	6–0	Betekom (5)
221	Termien (4)	1–1 (2–4 p)	Thes (3)
222	La Calamine (4)	1–6	Sporting Hasselt (3)
223	Knokke (3)	3–0	Raeren-Eynatten (4)
224	Westhoek (4)	1–4	Hamme (5)
225	Sparta Petegem (4)	2–1	Geer (5)
226	Nijlen (5)	1–4	Rochefort (3)
227	Belisia Bilzen (3)	3–0	Racing Gent (4)
228	Ganshoren (4)	2–1	Ciney (5)
229	Zelzate (4)	1–1 (1–2 p)	La Louvière Centre (4)

== Fifth round ==
This round was played on 25 August 2024 and featured the 38 winners from the previous round.

Number of teams per tier still in competition
Pro League	Challenger Pro League	Division 1	Division 2	Division 3	Provincial Leagues	Total
16 / 16	13 / 13	14 / 21	14 / 44	8 / 62	2 / 140	67 / 296

Tie	Home team (tier)	Score	Away team (tier)
230	Sporting Hasselt (3)	0–1	Thes (3)
231	Belisia Bilzen (3)	3–0	Stockay (3)
232	Diegem (4)	1–3	Mons (3)
233	Meux (4)	2–1	Geel (5)
234	Knokke (3)	2–0	Rupel Boom (4)
235	Ganshoren (4)	1–1 (2–3 p)	Diksmuide-Oostende (5)
236	Ninove (3)	5–1	Bredene (6)
237	Biesme (5)	0–2	Binche (3)
238	Berg en Dal (4)	1–1 (2–4 p)	Elsautoise (5)
239	Aywaille (4)	4–1	La Louvière Centre (4)
240	Sparta Petegem (4)	3–2	Racing Mechelen (4)
241	Acren-Lessines (4)	1–2	Lyra-Lierse Berlaar (3)
242	Hamme (5)	3–1	Kalken (5)
243	Houtvenne (4)	3–3 (4–1 p)	Sporting Bruxelles (5)
244	Rochefort (3)	1–0	Voorde-Appelterre (4)
245	Dikkelvenne (4)	1–0	Wetteren (5)
246	Tubize-Braine (3)	2–0	Onhaye (4)
247	Olympic Charleroi (3)	4–0	Turkse Rangers (6)
248	Merelbeke (3)	0–2	Dessel (3)

== Sixth round ==
This round is set to be played from 6 to 8 September 2024 and will feature the 19 winners from the previous round and the 13 eligible clubs from the Challenger Pro League.

Number of teams per tier still in competition
Pro League	Challenger Pro League	Division 1	Division 2	Division 3	Provincial Leagues	Total
16 / 16	13 / 13	11 / 21	5 / 44	3 / 62	0 / 140	48 / 296

6 September 2024	Diksmuide-Oostende (5)	2–3	Eupen (2)
20:00 CEST	Couckuyt 30'; Vandendriessche 67'	Report	Nuhu 33'; Emond 58'; Pantović 65' (pen.)

7 September 2024	Ninove (3)	1–3	Lokeren-Temse (2)
19:00 CEST	Chirishungu 90'	Report	Van Aerschot 27'; Boonen 30'; Brebels 66'

7 September 2024	Dessel (3)	2–3 (a.e.t.)	Beveren (2)
19:30 CEST	Geukens 9'; Bentayeb 61'	Report	Limbombe 49'; Michiwaki 79'; Geusens 97'

7 September 2024	Tubize-Braine (3)	2–1	Francs Borains (2)
20:00 CEST	Migliore 15'; Lauwrensens 82'	Report	Donnez 44'

7 September 2024	Mons (3)	1–1 (a.e.t.) (4–5 p)	La Louvière (2)
20:00 CEST	Kumbi 54'	Report	Bongiovanni 46'
	Penalties
	Chevalier (penalty scored); Cordaro (penalty scored); Brogno (penalty scored); Felix (penalty scored); Benoit (penalty missed)		(penalty scored) Eyongo; (penalty scored) Pau; (penalty scored) Maisonneuve; (penalty scored) Guindo; (penalty scored) Maës

7 September 2024	Patro Eisden (2)	2–1	Binche (3)
20:00 CEST	Kiankaulua 38'; Renson 65'	Report	Hassaini 64' (pen.)

7 September 2024	RWD Molenbeek (2)	5–0	Aywaille (4)
20:00 CEST	Toussaint 10' (o.g.); Albino 45', 80'; Robail 49'; Poku 68'	Report

8 September 2024	Sparta Petegem (4)	1–3	Zulte Waregem (2)
14:30 CEST	Goemaere 36' (pen.)	Report	Vossen 16'; Traoré 82', 86'

8 September 2024	Lyra-Lierse Berlaar (3)	3–0	Meux (4)
15:00 CEST	Adesanya 5', 49'; Schils 57'	Report

8 September 2024	Thes (3)	2–2 (a.e.t.) (1–4 p)	Seraing (2)
16:00 CEST	Jeunen 16'; Vanhaeren 90'	Report	Schouterden 10'; Fall 23'
	Penalties
	Vanhaeren (penalty missed); Jeunen (penalty missed); Swinnen (penalty missed); Van Elsen (penalty scored); Vanaken (penalty missed)		(penalty missed) Perrey; (penalty scored) Fall; (penalty scored) Droehnlé; (penalty scored) Camara; (penalty scored) Boukteb

8 September 2024	Knokke (3)	3–5	Olympic Charleroi (3)
16:00 CEST	Prudhomme 73' (pen.); Pieters 84'; De Bodt 80'	Report	Paulet 27' (pen.); Rousseau 35'; Mputu 50', 64'; Gassama 90'

8 September 2024	Rochefort (3)	1–1 (a.e.t.) (5–4 p)	Hamme (5)
16:00 CEST	Cornet 53'	Report	Moriconi 72' (o.g.)
	Penalties
	Renquin (penalty scored); Perseo (penalty scored); Janelas (penalty scored); Wilmots (penalty missed); Cornet (penalty scored); Torrado (penalty scored)		(penalty scored) Claeys; (penalty missed) Goossens; (penalty scored) Varela; (penalty scored) Djadi; (penalty scored) Penneman; (penalty missed) Laurens

8 September 2024	Lommel (2)	0–1	Belisia Bilzen (3)
16:00 CEST		Report	Maus 39'

8 September 2024	RFC Liège (2)	3–1	Elsautoise (5)
16:00 CEST	Atteri 46'; Lefebvre 53'; Ngawa 69'	Report	Deville 21'

8 September 2024	Lierse Kempenzonen (2)	3–2	Houtvenne (4)
16:00 CEST	Daguin 4'; Dailly 22'; Claes 55'	Report	Lauwers 10'; Mathei 90'

8 September 2024	Deinze (2)	3–0	Dikkelvenne (4)
18:30 CEST	De Ridder 35'; Burgos 71'; Mertens 85'	Report

== Seventh round ==
The draw for the seventh round took place on 9 September 2024 and included the sixteen teams that progressed from the sixth round and the sixteen teams from the Belgian Pro League. The Pro League teams were seeded and could not meet each other. Furthermore, the five non-professional teams left in the draw were always entitled to home-ground advantage, except for Belisia Bilzen, Lyra-Lierse Berlaar, and Rochefort as their respective home grounds were not deemed suitable to host a cup match. This round is set to be played from 29 to 31 October 2024.

Number of teams per tier still in competition
Pro League	Challenger Pro League	Division 1	Division 2	Division 3	Provincial Leagues	Total
16 / 16	11 / 13	5 / 21	0 / 44	0 / 62	0 / 140	32 / 296

29 October 2024	Patro Eisden Maasmechelen (2)	4–1	Charleroi (1)	Maasmechelen
20:00 CET	Renson 14'; Dansoko 17'; Bammens 47'; Abid 65'	Report	Heymans 61' (pen.)	Stadium: Gemeentelijk Sportparkstadion Maasmechelen

29 October 2024	Zulte Waregem (2)	2–1	Dender EH (1)	Waregem
20:00 CET	Traoré 13'; Tanghe 35'	Report	Acquah 19'	Stadium: Elindus Arena

29 October 2024	Westerlo (1)	2–1	RWD Molenbeek (2)	Westerlo
20:00 CET	Frigan 45'; Reynolds 56'	Report	Halifa 56'	Stadium: Het Kuipje

30 October 2024	Beerschot (1)	3–1	RFC Liège (2)	Antwerp
20:00 CET	Colassin 8'; Verlinden 55'; Keita 57'		Arslan 60'	Stadium: Olympisch Stadion

30 October 2024	Beveren (2)	0–2	Genk (1)	Beveren
20:00 CET			Oh Hyeon-gyu 67' (pen.); Steuckers 90+1'	Stadium: Freethiel Stadion

30 October 2024	Mechelen (1)	3–1 (a.e.t.)	La Louvière (2)	Mechelen
20:00 CET	Bafdili 56'; Raman 100', 116'		Belkheir 90'	Stadium: Achter de Kazerne

30 October 2024	Eupen (2)	0–3	Union SG (1)	Eupen
20:00 CET			David 59' (pen.), 69'; Kabangu 83'	Stadium: Kehrwegstadion

30 October 2024	Kortrijk (1)	1–0	Lokeren-Temse (2)	Kortrijk
20:00 CET	Kadri 46'			Stadium: Guldensporen Stadion

30 October 2024	OH Leuven (1)	2–0	Seraing (2)	Leuven
20:00 CET	Schrijvers 11' (pen.); Balikwisha 86'			Stadium: Den Dreef

30 October 2024	Gent (1)	7–0	Rochefort (3)	Ghent
20:00 CET	Gerkens 6'; Sonko 18', 56'; Varela 31', 79'; Dean 75' (pen.), 87'			Stadium: Ghelamco Arena

30 October 2024	Club Brugge (1)	6–1	Belisia Bilzen (3)	Bruges
20:30 CET	Jutglà 15', 17'; Romero 24'; Nilsson 64'; Meijer 68'; Skóraś 87'		Valcke 36'	Stadium: Jan Breydel Stadium

30 October 2024	Standard (1)	3–2 (a.e.t.)	Lyra-Lierse Berlaar (3)	Liege
20:30 CET	Kuavita 16'; Eckert 42'; O'Neill 101'		Kil 23'; Peffer 33'	Stadium: Stade Maurice Dufrasne

30 October 2024	Lierse Kempenzonen (2)	0–2	Sint-Truiden (1)	Lier
20:45 CET			Ferrari 43'; Dumont 90+5'	Stadium: Herman Vanderpoortenstadion

31 October 2024	Cercle Brugge (1)	3–0	Olympic Charleroi (3)	Bruges
20:00 CET	Nunes 23'; Francis 35'; Magnée 89'			Stadium: Jan Breydel Stadium

31 October 2024	Tubize-Braine (3)	0–4	Anderlecht (1)	Tubize
20:30 CET			Dreyer 27' (pen.); Dolberg 65', 66', 86'	Stadium: Stade Leburton

31 October 2024	Antwerp (1)	6–1	Deinze (2)	Antwerp
20:45 CET	Janssen 29'; Corbanie 30'; Chery 48', 72'; Valencia 68', 88'		Mertens 53'	Stadium: Bosuilstadion

== Eighth round ==
The draw for the eighth round took place on 31 October 2024, immediately after the completion of the final match of the previous round. No more seedings were used during the draw. Arguably, the most notable pairing was that between Genk and Standard, although former Club Brugge goalkeeper and Patro Eisden Maasmechelen manager Stijn Stijnen was awarded a home tie against his former club which also stood out.

Number of teams per tier still in competition
Pro League	Challenger Pro League	Division 1	Division 2	Division 3	Provincial Leagues	Total
14 / 16	2 / 13	0 / 21	0 / 44	0 / 62	0 / 140	16 / 296

3 December 2024	Patro Eisden Maasmechelen (2)	1–3	Club Brugge (1)	Maasmechelen
20:45 CET	Van Eenoo 31'	Report	Nielsen 13'; Vanaken 48'; Jashari 81'	Stadium: Gemeentelijk Sportparkstadion Maasmechelen

4 December 2024	OH Leuven (1)	5–0	Zulte Waregem (2)	Leuven
20:00 CET	Kuruçay 16'; Maziz 36'; Banzuzi 40'; N'Dri 54'; Ikwuemesi 61'	Report		Stadium: Den Dreef

4 December 2024	Union SG (1)	3–2	Gent (1)	Forest
20:00 CET	David 14', 59'; Fuseini 49'	Report	Dean 44'; Gandelman 63'	Stadium: Joseph Marien Stadium

4 December 2024	Beerschot (1)	2–2 (a.e.t.) (4–3 p)	Mechelen (1)	Antwerp
20:30 CET	Colassin 89'; Konstantopoulos 111'	Report	Hairemans 76'; Bafdili 119'	Stadium: Olympisch Stadion
	Penalties
	Henderson (penalty scored); Reyners (penalty scored); Dagba (penalty missed); Kosiah (penalty scored); Al-Ghamdi (penalty scored)		(penalty missed) Pflücke; (penalty scored) Raemaekers; (penalty missed) Bafdili; (penalty scored) Van den Eynden; (penalty scored) Touba

4 December 2024	Cercle Brugge (1)	0–1	Sint-Truiden (1)	Bruges
20:30 CET		Report	Ferrari 11'	Stadium: Jan Breydel Stadium

4 December 2024	Genk (1)	2–1 (a.e.t.)	Standard Liège (1)	Genk
20:30 CET	Arokodare 73'; Hrošovský 116'	Report	Zeqiri 66'	Stadium: Cegeka Arena

4 December 2024	Kortrijk (1)	0–0 (a.e.t.) (3–4 p)	Antwerp (1)	Kortrijk
20:30 CET		Report		Stadium: Guldensporen Stadion
	Penalties
	Ambrose (penalty scored); Bruno (penalty missed); Kaneko (penalty scored); Fossum (penalty missed); Mehssatou (penalty scored)		(penalty missed) Odoi; (penalty scored) Vandeplas; (penalty scored) Butez; (penalty scored) Corbanie; (penalty scored) Alderweireld

5 December 2024	Anderlecht (1)	4–1	Westerlo (1)	Anderlecht
20:30 CET	Jørgensen 11'; Dolberg 32', 56'; N'Diaye 43'	Report	Van den Keybus 8'	Stadium: Lotto Park

== Quarter-finals ==
The draw for the quarter-finals and semi-finals took place on 5 December 2024, immediately after completion of the final match.

Number of teams per tier still in competition
Pro League	Challenger Pro League	Division 1	Division 2	Division 3	Provincial Leagues	Total
8 / 16	0 / 13	0 / 21	0 / 44	0 / 62	0 / 140	8 / 296

7 January 2025	Club Brugge (1)	3–0	OH Leuven (1)	Bruges
20:45	Tzolis 23', 69'; Skóraś 86' (pen.)	Report		Stadium: Jan Breydel Stadium

7 January 2025	Sint-Truiden (1)	0–4	Genk (1)	Sint-Truiden
20:45		Report	Oh Hyeon-gyu 30', 52'; Ouahdi 62'; Adedeji-Sternberg 81'	Stadium: Stayen

8 January 2025	Antwerp (1)	5–1	Union SG (1)	Antwerp
20:45	Chery 40', 50' (pen.); Janssen 64'; Kerk 84'; Praet 90+3'	Report	Sadiki 56'	Stadium: Bosuilstadion; Referee: Lawrence Visser

9 January 2025	Beerschot (1)	0–1	Anderlecht (1)	Antwerp
20:30		Report	Simić 2'	Stadium: Olympisch Stadion; Referee: Bram Van Driessche

== Semi-finals ==
The four quarter-final winners entered the semi-finals, held over two legs.

Number of teams per tier still in competition
Pro League	Challenger Pro League	Division 1	Division 2	Division 3	Provincial Leagues	Total
4 / 16	0 / 13	0 / 21	0 / 44	0 / 62	0 / 140	4 / 296

=== First legs ===
15 January 2025	Club Brugge (1)	2–1	Genk (1)	Sint-Andries
20:45	Ordóñez 34'; Tzolis 74' (pen.)	Report	Arokodare 28'	Stadium: Jan Breydel Stadium; Referee: Lawrence Visser

16 January 2025	Anderlecht (1)	1–0	Antwerp (1)	Anderlecht
				Stadium: Constant Vanden Stock Stadium

=== Second legs ===
5 February 2025	Genk (1)	1–1 (2–3 agg.)	Club Brugge (1)	Genk
20:45 CET	El Ouahdi 14'	Report	24' Ordóñez	Stadium: Cegeka Arena; Referee: Nicolas Laforge

6 February 2025	Antwerp (1)	2–2 (2–3 agg.)	Anderlecht (1)	Antwerp
20:45 CET	Odoi 26'; Kerk 85'	Report	32' Verschaeren; 90+1' Dendoncker	Stadium: Bosuilstadion; Referee: Jasper Vergoote

== Final ==
4 May 2025
18:00 CEST

Club Brugge	2–1	Anderlecht
Vermant 40', 61'	Report	Vázquez 90+1'

King Baudouin Stadium, Brussels
Attendance: 40,861
Referee: Jasper Vergoote

== Notes ==
1. Tie reversed after the original draw.
2. Tie reversed after the original draw. Despite having adequate facilities, the city council of the city of Charleroi did not approve and hence the match was played in Bruges.
