= 2025–26 Belgian Cup =

Croky Cup

Tournament details
- Country: Belgium
- Dates: 19 July 2025 – 14 May 2026
- Teams: 301

Final positions
- Champions: Union SG (4th title)
- Runners-up: Anderlecht

The 2025–26 Belgian Cup, called the Croky Cup for sponsorship reasons, is the 71st season of Belgium's annual football cup competition. The competition began on 19 July 2025. The winners of the competition will qualify for the 2026–27 UEFA Europa League. Club Brugge are the defending champions. Match times up to 26 October 2025 and from 29 March 2026 are CEST (UTC+2). Times on interim ("winter") days are CET (UTC+1).

== Competition format ==
The competition consists of eleven proper rounds. All rounds are single-match elimination rounds, except for the semi-finals. When tied after 90 minutes in the first three rounds, penalties will be taken immediately. From round four onwards, when tied after 90 minutes first an extra time period of 30 minutes will be played, then penalties are to be taken if still necessary.

== Round and draw dates ==
Round	Draw date	Match dates
Provincial Round	27 June 2025	19–20 July 2025
First Round	27 June 2025	26–27 July 2025
Second Round	27 June 2025	2–3 August 2025
Third Round	27 June 2025	9–10 August 2025
Fourth Round	27 June 2025	16–17 August 2025
Fifth Round	27 June 2025	23–24 August 2025
Sixth Round	27 June 2025	5–7 September 2025
Seventh Round	8 September 2025	28–30 October 2025
Eighth Round	30 October 2025	2-4 December 2025
Quarter-finals	4 December 2025	13-15 January 2026
Semi-finals	4 December 2025	3-5 February 2026 (1st legs)
Semi-finals	4 December 2025	10-12 February 2026 (2nd legs)
Final	n/a	14 May 2026

== Preliminary round ==
This round of matches was played on 19 and 20 July 2025. It featured 52 teams from the provincial leagues.

Number of teams per tier still in competition
Pro League	Challenger Pro League	Division 1	Division 2	Division 3	Provincial Leagues	Total
16 / 16	13 / 13	23 / 23	46 / 46	63 / 63	140 / 140	301 / 301

Tie	Home team (tier)	Score	Away team (tier)
1	Brasschaat	2–5	Antonia
2	Leeuw Brucom	2–4	Zuun
3	Boortmeerbeek-Hs United	0–6	Herent
4	Stockel	0–2	Waterloo
5	Bree-Beek	2–2 (3–5 p)	Torpedo Hasselt
6	Kaulille	4–2	St-Elen B
7	Herk-De-Stad	5–2	Linkhout
8	'S Herenelderen	0–5	Kadijk Overpelt
9	Helson Helchteren	0–5 (forfeit)	Eigenbilzen
10	Jong Vl Kruibeke	0–5 (forfeit)	Beveren
11	Kleit Maldegem	0–5 (forfeit)	Schellebelle
12	KSV Kortrijk	1–2	Club Roeselare
13	Ardooie	2–2 (5–4 p)	Sottegem

Tie	Home team (tier)	Score	Away team (tier)
14	Bredene	1–4	Wielsbeke
15	Varsenare	0–0 (7–8 p)	St-Martens-Latem
16	St-Andre Ochamps	3–1	Gouvy
17	Oppagne-Weris	5–0 (forfeit)	Arlon
18	Trois-Ponts	1–0	Wallonia Waimes
19	Sartoise	4–0	Rochois
20	Pepingen-Halle	5–0 (forfeit)	Oetingen
21	Stree	2–2 (4–2 p)	Nismes
22	Peruwelz	4–2	Petigny-Frasnes
23	Farciennes	4–5	Grand-Leez
24	Ostiches-Ath B	3–2	Frasnoise
25	Bossiere Gembloux	1–8	Stephanois
26	Chevetogne	4–3	Vyle-Tharoul

== First round ==
This round was played on 26 and 27 July 2025 and featured the 26 winners from the preliminary round joined by the 88 other provincial teams that had not played yet. A total of 114 teams competed, with 57 advancing to the second round.

Number of teams per tier still in competition
Pro League	Challenger Pro League	Division 1	Division 2	Division 3	Provincial Leagues	Total
16 / 16	13 / 13	23 / 23	46 / 46	63 / 63	114 / 140	275 / 301

Tie	Home team (tier)	Score	Away team (tier)
27	Retie	2–2 (5–4 p)	Sporting Tisselt
28	Grobbendonk	4–3	Lint
29	Kontich	7–1	De Vrede Wechelderzande
30	Antonia	0–1	s Gravenwezel-Schilde
31	Bevel	2–0	Zandvliet Sport
32	Noordstar	5–0	Hooikt
33	Berlaar-Heikant	1–1 (4–2 p)	Bornem
34	Wijgmaal	5–0	Haacht
35	Herent	1–0	Zuun
36	Hoeilaart	0–3	Waterloo
37	Standaard Meerbeek	0–2	Betekom
38	EMI Essene	1–1 (6–7 p)	Galmaarden
39	Lutlommel	2–4	Dessel Sport B
40	Landen	6–0	Eigenbilzen
41	Zonhoven United	4–1	Stormvogels Drieslinter
42	Torpedo Hasselt	4–1	St Elen
43	Kaulille	1–4	Witgoor Sport
44	Herk-De-Stad	2–1	Kadijk Overpelt
45	Zutendaal	0–3	Ezaart Sport Mol
46	Borsbeke	2–0	Kallo
47	Denderhoutem	2–1	Schellebelle
48	Goalgetters St-Laureins	1–5	Avanti Stekene
49	Munkzwalm	4–0	Evergem 2020
50	Beveren	3–1	Vrasene
51	Eendracht Hansbeke	0–2	Sparta Waasmunster
52	Mazenzele Opwijk	0–0 (5–6 p)	Eeklo
53	Wevelgem City	1–3	Club Roeselare
54	Aalbeke Sport	2–3	Zwevegem Sport

Tie	Home team (tier)	Score	Away team (tier)
55	Eendracht Aalter	10–2	Oostkamp B
56	Racing Waregem	1–3	Marke
57	Bissegem	1–2	Ardooie
58	Wielsbeke	3–5	Sparta Heestert
59	Eendracht Wervik	1–3	St-Martens-Latem
60	Florenvillois	0–2	Longlier
61	St-Andre Ochamps	0–4	Assenois
62	Trois-Ponts	2–2 (3–4 p)	Wallonia Libin
63	Sartoise	3–4	Oppagne-Weris
64	Etterbeek	2–1	Auderghem
65	Amicii Bxl Jette	1–4	La Hulpe
66	Lasne Ohain	1–1 (6–7 p)	Léopold
67	Rebecquoise	1–2	Pepingen-Halle
68	St-Vith	3–2	Warsage
69	Hannutois	3–1	Stree
70	Wanze/Bas-Oha	3–2	Croatia Wandre
71	Orp-Noduwez	2–1	Fizoise
72	Jalhaytois	2–2 (3–5 p)	Verlaine B
73	Templiers-Nandrin	1–2	Wanze/Bas-Oha B
74	Mons B	2–3	Gosselies Sports
75	Luingnois	3–1	Estaimbourg
76	Neufvilles	0–2	Molenbaix
77	Ostiches-Ath B	0–5	Pays Blanc Antoinien
78	Le Roeulx	2–1	Peruwelz
79	Isieroise	2–7	Grand-Leez
80	Rochefortoise B	6–0	Rhisnois
81	Stephanois	2–2 (4–5 p)	Chevetogne
82	Meux B	5–2	Erpion-Lacs
83	Profondeville	1–1 (2–4 p)	Bioul 81

== Second round ==
This round was played on 2 and 3 August 2025. The 57 winners from the first round were joined by the 63 clubs from the Division 3. A total of 60 teams were eliminated.

Number of teams per tier still in competition
Pro League	Challenger Pro League	Division 1	Division 2	Division 3	Provincial Leagues	Total
16 / 16	13 / 13	23 / 23	46 / 46	63 / 63	57 / 140	218 / 301

Tie	Home team	Score	Away team
84	De Kempen (5)	6–0	Noordstar
85	Waterloo	1–2	Achel (5)
86	Turkse Rangers (5)	2–0	Landen
87	Betekom	1–1 (4–2 p)	Esperanza Pelt (5)
88	Bevel	0–3	Schoonbeek-Beverst (5)
89	Wezel Sport (5)	5–0	Herent
90	Kontich (5)	2–1	Geel (5)
91	Du Geer (5)	2–1	's Gravenwezel-Schilde
92	Wijgmaal	1–3	Zwarte Leeuw (5)
93	Turnhout (5)	5–1	Grobbendonk
94	Galmaarden	0–4	Sint-Lenaarts (5)
95	Retie	1–0	Waremmien (5)
96	Berlaar-Heikant	2–3	Herleving Haasdonk (5)
97	Lille United (5)	1–0	Dessel Sport B
98	Voorde-Appelterre (5)	5–0	Elewijt (5)
99	Witgoor Sport	0–3	Tempo Overijse (5)
100	Huldenberg (5)	1–1 (2–4 p)	Fenixx Beigem Humbeek (5)
101	City Pirates (5)	4–0	Herk-De-Stad
102	Avanti Stekene	0–2	Kosova Schaerbeek (5)
103	Borsbeke	3–2	Wambeek Ternat (5)
104	Saint-Michel (5)	0–5 (forfeit)	Torpedo Hasselt
105	Zepperen-Brustem (5)	8–0	Munkzwalm
106	Wilrijk (5)	2–1	Zonhoven United
107	Stade Everois (5)	2–2 (4–5 p)	Ezaart Sport Mol
108	Denderhoutem	1–4	Jodoigne (5)
109	Longlier	0–4	St-Ghislain Tertre-Hautrage (5)
110	Sparta Waasmunster	1–1 (6–5 p)	Olsa Brakel (5)
111	Eendracht Aalter	1–3	Erpe-Mere United (5)
112	Blankenberge (5)	5–0	Eeklo
113	Beveren	0–2	Elene-Grotenberge (5)
114	Club Lauwe (5)	2–0	Assenois

Tie	Home team	Score	Away team
115	Stade Mouscronnois (5)	0–1	Marke
116	Sparta Heestert	3–5	Sassport Boezinge (5)
117	Berlare (5)	0–3	St-Martens-Latem
118	Club Roeselare	1–0	La Louviere Centre (5)
119	Oppagne-Weris	1–3	Rumbeke (5)
120	St-Denijs Sport (5)	1–4	Zwevegem Sport
121	Drongen (5)	4–1	Ardooie
122	Eendracht Aalst Lede (5)	11–1	Wallonia Libin
123	Momalloise (5)	0–4	Léopold
124	Harre-Manhay (5)	2–3	Evelette-Jallet (5)
125	Aubel (5)	1–3	Wanze/Bas-Oha
126	Wanze/Bas-Oha B	0–2	Meix Dt-Virton (5)
127	Libramontois (5)	1–3	Etterbeek
128	Orp-Noduwez	1–6	Elsautoise (5)
129	Verlaine (5)	2–3	La Hulpe
130	Verlaine B	1–2	Houffaloise (5)
131	Eupen 1963 (5)	0–2	St-Vith
132	Messancy (5)	1–0	Hannutois
133	Sprimont (5)	4–0	Pepingen-Halle
134	Bioul 81	3–3 (5–3 p)	Aische (5)
135	Monceau (5)	2–2 (4–2 p)	Meux B
136	Molenbaix	1–1 (3–4 p)	Marloie Sport (5)
137	Luingnois	1–2	Arquet (5)
138	Pays Blanc Antoinien	3–3 (3–4 p)	Pont-A-Celles-Buzet (5)
139	Grand-Leez	2–0	Condruzien (5)
140	Mormont (5)	2–3	Gosselies Sports
141	Ciney (5)	7–3	Rochefortoise B
142	Biesme (5)	5–0	Chevetogne
143	Le Roeulx	3–1	Loyers (5)

== Third round ==
This round was played on 9 and 10 August 2025. The 60 winners from the second round were joined by the 46 clubs from the Division 2. A total of 53 teams were eliminated.

Number of teams per tier still in competition
Pro League	Challenger Pro League	Division 1	Division 2	Division 3	Provincial Leagues	Total
16 / 16	13 / 13	23 / 23	46 / 46	41 / 63	19 / 140	158 / 301

Tie	Home team	Score	Away team
144	Grand-Leez	1–4	Gullegem (4)
145	Tournai (4)	1–4	Zwevegem Sport
146	Drongen (5)	0–2	Marke
147	Hamme (4)	0–1	City Pirates (5)
148	Wezel Sport (5)	3–2	Racing Gent (4)
149	Sparta Petegem (4)	2–2 (5–3 p)	Achel (5)
150	Messancy (5)	1–2	Jodoigne (5)
151	De Kempen (5)	1–3	Sportief Rotselaar (4)
152	Turkse Rangers (5)	5–1	Marloie Sport (5)
153	Torpedo Hasselt	2–4	Oudenaarde (4)
154	La Hulpe	2–5	Evelette-Jallet (5)
155	Lille United (5)	4–1	Elene-Grotenberge (5)
156	Heist (4)	5–0	Zwarte Leeuw (5)
157	Fenixx Beigem Humbeek (5)	1–3	Hades Kiewit Hasselt (4)
158	La Calamine (4)	2–0	St-Vith
159	Ezaart Sport Mol	0–4	Berchem Sport (4)
160	Betekom	0–2	Harelbeke (4)
161	Westhoek (4)	3–0	Retie
162	Voorde-Appelterre (5)	3–0	Monceau (5)
163	Ostiches-Ath (4)	1–1 (6–5 p)	Elsautoise (5)
164	Du Geer (5)	2–1	Racing Mechelen (4)
165	Wilrijk (5)	6–1	Houffaloise (5)
166	Ganshoren (4)	1–0	Wanze/Bas-Oha
167	Schoonbeek-Beverst (5)	2–0	Aywaille (4)
168	Herleving Haasdonk (5)	1–4	Acren Lessines (4)
169	Eendracht Aalst Lede (5)	1–0	Bocholt (4)
170	Tempo Overijse (5)	1–0	Union Hutoise (4)
171	Erpe-Mere United (5)	2–0	Tongeren (4)
172	Borsbeke	4–1	Stade Vervietois (4)
173	United Richelle (4)	4–1	Sint-Lenaarts (5)

Tie	Home team	Score	Away team
174	Eendracht Termien (4)	5–1	Sassport Boezinge (5)
175	Rumbeke (5)	4–1	Flenu (4)
176	Binche (4)	2–0	Turnhout (5)
177	Club Lauwe (5)	0–1	Wetteren (4)
178	Hoger Op Kalken (4)	1–2	Meix Dt-Virton (5)
179	Ciney (5)	1–3	Londerzeel (4)
180	Sporting Bruxelles (4)	5–2	Bioul 81
181	Mandel United (4)	2–1	Etterbeek
182	Sprimont (5)	0–0 (4–3 p)	Torhout (4)
183	Jette (4)	2–1	Léopold
184	Arquet (5)	3–3 (3–2 p)	Onhaye (4)
185	Brainois (4)	2–1	Club Roeselare
186	Tilffois (4)	3–3 (3–4 p)	St-Martens-Latem
187	Kosova Schaerbeek (5)	0–0 (8–9 p)	Entite Manageoise (4)
188	Raeren-Eynatten (4)	2–0	Zepperen-Brustem (5)
189	Sparta Waasmunster	0–7	Lebbeke (4)
190	Nijlen (4)	4–0	Le Roeulx
191	Cappellen (4)	1–0	Blankenberge (5)
192	Wellen (4)	4–0	Biesme (5)
193	Oostkamp (4)	2–0	Kontich (5)
194	Berg en Dal (4)	4–1	Gosselies Sports
195	St-Ghislain Tertre-Hautrage (5)	1–3	Diksmuide-Oostende (4)
196	Rupel Boom (4)	0–0 (2–4 p)	Pont-A-Celles-Buzet (5)

== Fourth round ==
This round was played on 16 and 17 August 2025. The 53 winners from the third round were joined by the 23 clubs from the Division 1. A total of 38 teams were eliminated.

Number of teams per tier still in competition
Pro League	Challenger Pro League	Division 1	Division 2	Division 3	Provincial Leagues	Total
16 / 16	13 / 13	23 / 23	30 / 46	16 / 63	7 / 140	105 / 301

Tie	Home team	Score	Away team
197	Crossing Schaerbeek (3)	4–1	Wilrijk
198	Belisia Bilzen (3)	3–0	Turkse Rangers
199	Ganshoren	0–1	Gullegem (4)
200	Sparta Petegem (4)	2–2 (4–5 p)	Tempo Overijse (5)
201	Sporting Hasselt (3)	7–1	Hades Kiewit Hasselt (4)
202	Zelzate (3)	1–2	Diksmuide-Oostende (4)
203	Berg en Dal (4)	1–2	Borsbeke
204	Thes Sport (3)	1–0	Entite Manageoise (4)
205	United Richelle (4)	1–3	Hoogstraten (3)
206	Union Namur (3)	0–1	Eendracht Termien (4)
207	Brainois (4)	5–1	Marke
208	Mons (3)	4–1	Harelbeke (4)
209	Merelbeke (3)	3–0	Rumbeke (5)
210	Stockay (3)	2–3	Arquet (5)
211	Meux (3)	1–0	Pont-A-Celles-Buzet (5)
212	Nijlen (4)	4–2	Wellen (4)
213	Virton (3)	5–1	Zwevegem Sport
214	Tienen (3)	1–3	Westhoek (4)
215	Eendracht Aalst Lede (5)	1–1 (4–2 p)	Habay La Neuve (3)

Tie	Home team	Score	Away team
216	Dessel Sport (3)	4–0	Oostkamp (4)
217	Schoonbeek-Beverst (5)	3–3 (5–4 p)	Wezel Sport (5)
218	Evelette-Jallet (5)	1–3	Oudenaarde (4)
219	Voorde-Appelterre (5)	3–1	Ostiches-Ath (4)
220	Houtvenne (3)	3–0	Jette (4)
221	Londerzeel (4)	5–1	Sporting Bruxelles (4)
222	Jodoigne (5)	0–3	Ninove (3)
223	Du Geer (5)	1–1 (4–3 p)	Roeselare (3)
224	Binche (4)	3–1	Erpe-Mere United (5)
225	Sprimont (5)	2–4	Cappellen (4)
226	Diegem Sport (3)	3–2	La Calamine (4)
227	Sportief Rotselaar (4)	3–2	Lebbeke (4)
228	Knokke (3)	3–1	Raeren-Eynatten (4)
229	City Pirates (5)	2–2 (3–4 p)	Tubize-Braine (3)
230	Acren Lessines (4)	1–0	St-Martens-Latem
231	Lyra-Lierse (3)	4–1	Lille United (5)
232	Meix Dt-Virton (5)	3–1	Mandel United (4)
233	Berchem Sport (4)	0–4	Heist (4)
234	Wetteren (4)	5–3	Rochefortoise (3)

== Fifth round ==
This round was played on 23 and 24 August 2025 and featured the 38 winners from the previous round.

Number of teams per tier still in competition
Pro League	Challenger Pro League	Division 1	Division 2	Division 3	Provincial Leagues	Total
16 / 16	13 / 13	16 / 23	14 / 46	7 / 63	1 / 140	67 / 301

Tie	Home team	Score	Away team
235	Tempo Overijse (5)	0–4	Tubize-Braine (3)
236	Eendracht Termien (4)	2–0	Westhoek (4)
237	Voorde-Appelterre (5)	1–3	Ninove (3)
238	Heist (4)	2–0	Nijlen (4)
239	Knokke (3)	1–0	Thes Sport (3)
240	Virton (3)	3–3 (5–4 p)	Sporting Hasselt (3)
241	Lyra-Lierse (3)	2–2 (2–4 p)	Wetteren (4)
242	Londerzeel (4)	2–1	Diegem Sport (3)
243	Hoogstraten (3)	2–1 (a.e.t.)	Diksmuide-Oostende (4)
244	Brainois (4)	3–2 (a.e.t.)	Crossing Schaerbeek (3)

Tie	Home team	Score	Away team
245	Schoonbeek-Beverst (5)	1–2	Dessel Sport (3)
246	Meux (3)	1–2	Borsbeke
247	Eendracht Aalst Lede (5)	2–0	Sportief Rotselaar (4)
248	Cappellen (4)	0–0 (1–4 p)	Arquet (5)
249	Meix Dt-Virton (5)	0–4	Belisia Bilzen (3)
250	Du Geer (5)	1–1 (4–5 p)	Gullegem (4)
251	Oudenaarde (4)	1–0	Mons (3)
252	Acren Lessines (4)	1–2	Merelbeke (3)
253	Houtvenne (3)	2–1	Binche (4)

== Sixth round ==
This round was played from 5 to 7 September 2025 and featured the 19 winners from the previous round and the 13 eligible clubs from the Challenger Pro League.

Number of teams per tier still in competition
Pro League	Challenger Pro League	Division 1	Division 2	Division 3	Provincial Leagues	Total
16 / 16	13 / 13	9 / 23	7 / 46	2 / 63	1 / 140	48 / 301

Tie	Home team	Score	Away team
254	Heist (4)	2–0	Arquet (5)
255	Tubize-Braine (3)	2–1	Wetteren (4)
256	Eendracht Aalst Lede (5)	0–0 (a.e.t.) (6–5 p)	Eendracht Termien (4)
257	Virton (3)	0–1	Beerschot (2)
258	Belisia Bilzen (3)	1–1 (a.e.t.) (5–4 p)	Lokeren (2)
259	Dessel Sport (3)	2–4	RWDM Brussels (2)
260	Knokke (3)	1–0	Lommel (2)
261	Houtvenne (3)	0–2	Seraing (2)

Tie	Home team	Score	Away team
262	Olympic Charleroi (2)	3–1	Brainois (4)
263	Oudenaarde (4)	1–2	Patro Eisden Maasmechelen (2)
264	Eupen (2)	1–0	Borsbeke (6)
265	Hoogstraten (3)	1–3	Beveren (2)
266	Ninove (3)	2–1	Francs Borains (2)
267	Merelbeke (3)	0–2	Lierse (2)
268	Kortrijk (2)	3–0	Londerzeel (4)
269	RFC Liège (2)	5–1	Gullegem (4)

5 September 2025	Virton (3)	0–1	Beerschot (2)	Virton
20:30 CEST		Report	Vargas 12'	Stadium: Stade Yvan Georges

5 September 2025	Houtvenne (3)	0–2	Seraing (2)	Westerlo
20:30 CEST		Report	Soumah-Abbad 69'; Bouchentouf 75'	Stadium: Camp Westel Terrain 1

5 September 2025	Kortrijk (2)	3–0	Londerzeel (4)	Kortrijk
20:30 CEST	Van Den Steen 30' (o.g.); Ambrose 43'; Ogbuehi 57'	Report		Stadium: Guldensporen Stadion

6 September 2025	Dessel Sport (3)	2–4	RWDM Brussels (4)	Dessel
19:30 CEST	Vancamp 3'; Peers 6'	Report	Simbakoli 44', 53', 62'; Segovia 85'	Stadium: Armand Melisstadion

6 September 2025	Tubize-Braine (3)	2–1	Wetteren (4)	Tubize
20:00 CEST	Crame 43' (pen.), 84'	Report	Gaké 10'	Stadium: Stade Leburton

6 September 2025	Belisia Bilzen (3)	1–1 (a.e.t.) (5–3 p)	Lokeren (2)	Bilzen
20:00 CEST	Bongiorno 88'	Report	Boere 67' (pen.)	Stadium: Sportpark Katteberg
	Penalties
	Wijnen (penalty scored); Yayi Mpie (penalty scored); Bongiorno (penalty scored); Maus (penalty scored); Allemeersch (penalty scored)		(penalty scored) Boere; (penalty missed) Boujouh; (penalty scored) Janssen; (penalty scored) Van Den Bergh

6 September 2025	Hoogstraten (3)	1–3	Beveren (2)	Hoogstraten
20:00 CEST	Meeuwis 87' (pen.)	Report	Najim 68'; Van Hecke 82'; Ertürk 89'	Stadium: Sportcomplex Seminarie

6 September 2025	Ninove (3)	2–1	Francs Borains (2)	Ninove
20:00 CEST	Mukandila 44'; De Geyndt 48'	Report	Lima 86'	Stadium: De Kloppers

6 September 2025	Eupen (2)	1–0	Borsbeke (6)	Eupen
20:00 CEST	Bitumazala 20'	Report		Stadium: Kehrwegstadion

6 September 2025	Heist (4)	2–0	Arquet (5)	Heist-op-den-Berg
20:00 CEST	Devolder 60', 84'	Report		Stadium: Gemeentelijk Sportcentrum

6 September 2025	Oudenaarde (4)	1–2	Patro Eisden Maasmechelen (2)	Oudenaarde
20:00 CEST	Golike 90'	Report	Oghuma 60' (o.g.); Rousseau 80' (pen.)	Stadium: Burgemeester Thienpontstadion

7 September 2025	Olympic Charleroi (2)	3–1	Brainois (4)	Charleroi
16:00 CEST	Dailly 20'; Sarkic 45'; Ion 88'	Report	Sampaoli 46'	Stadium: Stade de la Neuville

7 September 2025	Eendracht Aalst Lede (5)	0–0 (a.e.t.) (6–5 p)	Eendracht Termien (4)	Aalst
16:00 CEST		Report		Stadium: Pierre Cornelisstadion
	Penalties
	Dekuyper (penalty scored); Geenens (penalty missed); Van Den Eeckhout (penalty missed); Odjidja-Ofoe (penalty scored); Wantens (penalty scored); Hornick (penalty scored); Favoreel (penalty scored); Ndefe (penalty scored)		(penalty scored) Cuypers; (penalty missed) El Gardoui; (penalty scored) Ovnicek; (penalty missed) Davies; (penalty scored) Piras; (penalty scored) Neven; (penalty scored) Alkan; (penalty missed) Mpeti Mambo

7 September 2025	RFC Liège (2)	5–1	Gullegem (4)	Liège
16:00 CEST	Diouf 16'; Gobitaka 40'; Wasinski 52'; Da Silva 58' (pen.); Mouchamps 65'	Report	Santens 82'	Stadium: Stade de Rocourt

7 September 2025	Merelbeke (3)	0–2	Lierse (2)	Merelbeke
16:00 CEST		Report	Gboua 40'; Demuynck 85'	Stadium: Sportpark Molenkouter

7 September 2025	Knokke (3)	1–0	Lommel (2)	Knokke
16:00 CEST	Vanraefelghem 72' (pen.)	Report		Stadium: Burgemeester Graaf Leopold Lippens Park

== Seventh round ==
This round was played from 28 to 30 October 2025 and featured the 16 winners from the previous round together with the 16 teams from the Pro League, which were seeded and could not draw each other. The 6 non-professional teams left in the draw all received home advantage prior to the draw, with the exception of Eendracht Aalst Lede whose pitch was deemed unsuitable to host matches at this level, they were automatically assigned the away team role prior to the draw. As a result, due to these rules, Knokke and Tubize-Braine (both originally drawn away) were handed the home advantage after the draw. The draw was held on 8 September 2025. Three days after the draw, the mayor of Ninove prohibited the match against Anderlecht to take place in Ninove, citing the stadium was too small to safely host the match, after which the clubs agreed Ninove would give up home advantage and instead play the match in Anderlecht.

Number of teams per tier still in competition
Pro League	Challenger Pro League	Division 1	Division 2	Division 3	Total
16 / 16	10 / 13	4 / 23	1 / 46	1 / 63	32 / 301

Tie	Home team	Score	Away team
270	Club Brugge (1)	6–1	Eendracht Aalst Lede (5)
271	Cercle Brugge (1)	1–0	Kortrijk (2)
272	Beerschot (2)	3–2	Westerlo (1)
273	Seraing (2)	1–3	OH Leuven (1)
274	Heist (4)	1–2	La Louvière (1)
275	RFC Liège (2)	0–1	Charleroi (1)
276	Tubize-Braine (3)	0–3	Union SG (1)
277	Belisia Bilzen (3)	1–4	Zulte Waregem (1)

Tie	Home team	Score	Away team
278	Beveren (2)	1–2	Standard Liège (1)
279	Anderlecht (1)	2–0	Ninove (3)
280	Antwerp (1)	3–1	Eupen (2)
281	Genk (1)	3–0	RWDM Brussels (2)
282	Gent (1)	5–0	Patro Eisden Maasmechelen (2)
283	Mechelen (1)	2–1	Lierse (2)
284	Knokke (3)	0–1	Sint-Truiden (1)
285	Dender EH (1)	4–2 (a.e.t.)	Olympic Charleroi (2)

28 October 2025	Mechelen (1)	2–1	Lierse (2)	Mechelen
20:30 CET	Lauberbach 43'; Van Brederode 74'	Report	Lenaerts 23'	Stadium: Achter de Kazerne

28 October 2025	Anderlecht (1)	2–0	Ninove (3)	Anderlecht
20:30 CET	Bertaccini 10'; Huerta 21'	Report		Stadium: Lotto Park

28 October 2025	Beveren (2)	1–2	Standard Liège (1)	Beveren
20:30 CET	Rigo 13'	Report	Henry 34'; Eckert 86' (pen.)	Stadium: Freethiel Stadion

28 October 2025	RFC Liège (2)	0–1	Charleroi (1)	Liège
20:30 CET		Report	Khalifi 90'	Stadium: Stade de Rocourt

28 October 2025	Dender EH (1)	4–2 (a.e.t.)	Olympic Charleroi (2)	Denderleeuw
20:30 CET	Nsimba 66'; Kadiri 90', 102'; Acquah 95'	Report	Corneillie 21'; Dailly 47' (pen.)	Stadium: Dender Football Complex

29 October 2025	Genk (1)	3–0	RWDM Brussels (2)	Genk
20:30 CET	Heymans 65', 77'; Heynen 70'	Report		Stadium: Cegeka Arena

29 October 2025	Heist (4)	1–2	La Louvière (1)	Heist-op-den-Berg
20:30 CET	Goossens 57'	Report	Pau 37' (pen.); Gillot 88'	Stadium: Gemeentelijk Sportcentrum

29 October 2025	Belisia Bilzen (3)	1–4	Zulte Waregem (1)	Bilzen
20:30 CET	Sulejmani 57'	Report	Hedl 12'; Aké 38', 44'; Soglo 64'	Stadium: Sportpark Katteberg

29 October 2025	Antwerp (1)	3–1	Eupen (2)	Antwerp
20:30 CET	Janssen 4', 20'; Hamdaoui 31'	Report	Busquets 70'	Stadium: Bosuilstadion

29 October 2025	Tubize-Braine (3)	0–3	Union SG (1)	Tubize
20:30 CET		Report	Rodríguez 46', 66'; David 90'	Stadium: Stade Leburton

29 October 2025	Club Brugge (1)	6–1	Eendracht Aalst Lede (5)	Bruges
20:30 CET	Mechele 7'; Campbell 14'; Wantens 38' (o.g.); Bauwens 57' (o.g.); Sandra 70', 90'	Report	Triest 51'	Stadium: Jan Breydel Stadium

30 October 2025	Knokke (3)	0–1	Sint-Truiden (1)	Knokke
20:30 CET		Report	Diriken 49'	Stadium: Burgemeester Graaf Leopold Lippens Park

30 October 2025	Cercle Brugge (1)	1–0	Kortrijk (2)	Bruges
20:30 CET	Jurado 13'	Report		Stadium: Jan Breydel Stadium

30 October 2025	Seraing (2)	1–3	OH Leuven (1)	Seraing
20:30 CET	Maziz 26' (o.g.)	Report	Kaba 10', 62'; Traoré 90+3'	Stadium: Stade du Pairay

30 October 2025	Beerschot (2)	3–2	Westerlo (1)	Antwerp
20:30 CET	Haraguchi 4'; Weymans 53'; Claes 72'	Report	Kimura 39'; Sakamoto 90+4'	Stadium: Olympisch Stadion

30 October 2025	Gent (1)	5–0	Patro Eisden Maasmechelen (2)	Gent
20:30 CET	Samoise 29'; Van der Heyden 63', 85'; Gandelman 81'; Itō 88'	Report		Stadium: Planet Group Arena

== Eighth round ==
This round was played from 2 to 4 December 2025 and will feature the 16 winners from the previous round. Beerschot is the only team left not from the top division. The draw for this round was made after the last matches from the seventh round were completed, and one day later, the exact dates and times were also confirmed. A notable fixture was the clash between Genk and Anderlecht, with all other bigger teams avoiding each other.

Number of teams per tier still in competition
Pro League	Challenger Pro League	Total
15 / 16	1 / 13	16 / 301

2 December 2025	Beerschot (2)	1–2	La Louvière (1)	Antwerp
20:30 CET	Vula 90+6'	Report	Fall 27', 37'	Stadium: Olympisch Stadion

2 December 2025	Dender EH (1)	3–2	Standard Liège (1)	Denderleeuw
20:30 CET	Moutha-Sebtaoui 14'; Hrnčár 41'; Berte 73'	Report	Eckert 1'; Nkada 28'	Stadium: Dender Football Complex

3 December 2025	Union SG (1)	2–1	Zulte Waregem (1)	Forest
20:30 CET	Rodríguez 73'; David 82'	Report	Ujka 14'	Stadium: Joseph Marien Stadium

3 December 2025	Antwerp (1)	3–3 (a.e.t.) (4–3 p)	Sint-Truiden (1)	Antwerp
20:30 CET	Kerk 15', 62'; Scott 21'	Report	Gotō 17', 69'; Vanwesemael 45+4'	Stadium: Bosuilstadion
	Penalties
	Janssen (penalty scored); Corbanie (penalty scored); Babadi (penalty scored); Van Den Bosch (penalty scored)		(penalty missed) Merlen; (penalty scored) Ferrari; (penalty scored) Musliu; (penalty scored) Janssens; (penalty missed) Sebaoui

3 December 2025	OH Leuven (1)	1–2	Club Brugge (1)	Leuven
20:30 CET	Kaba 71'	Report	Vetlesen 34'; Tzolis 82' (pen.)	Stadium: Den Dreef

3 December 2025	Cercle Brugge (1)	1–3	Gent (1)	Bruges
20:30 CET	Adewumi 34'	Report	Van der Heyden 9'; Kadri 45+1'; Goore 90+4'	Stadium: Jan Breydel Stadium

4 December 2025	Genk (1)	1–3 (a.e.t.)	Anderlecht (1)	Genk
20:30 CET	Karetsas 24'	Report	Bertaccini 82'; Hazard 107' (pen.); Kanaté 120+6'	Stadium: Cegeka Arena

4 December 2025	Charleroi (1)	2–0	Mechelen (1)	Charleroi
20:30 CET	Guiagon 52' (pen.); Nzita 74'	Report		Stadium: Stade du Pays de Charleroi

== Quarter-finals ==
The draw for the quarter-finals and semi-finals took place on 4 December 2025, after completion of the final matches of the eighth round. No team outside the Belgian Pro League remained at this stage.

13 January 2026	Charleroi (1)	2–0	Club Brugge (1)	Charleroi
20:30 CET	Guiagon 20' (pen.), 45+4'	Report		Stadium: Stade du Pays de Charleroi

13 January 2026	Antwerp (1)	2–1 (a.e.t.)	La Louvière (1)	Antwerp
20:30 CET	Kerk 13', 116'	Report	Fall 45+1'	Stadium: Bosuilstadion

14 January 2026	Dender EH (1)	0–2	Union SG (1)	Denderleeuw
20:30 CET		Report	David 21'; Van de Perre 41'	Stadium: Dender Football Complex

15 January 2026	Anderlecht (1)	1–0	Gent (1)	Anderlecht
20:30 CET	Hazard 28' (pen.)	Report		Stadium: Constant Vanden Stock Stadium

== Semi-finals ==
The four quarter-final winners entered the semi-finals, held over two legs.

=== First legs ===
4 February 2026	Charleroi	0–0	Union SG	Charleroi
20:30 CET		Report		Stadium: Stade du Pays de Charleroi

5 February 2026	Anderlecht	0–1	Antwerp	Brussels
20:30 CET		Report	Sardella 45+3' (o.g.)	Stadium: Constant Vanden Stock – Lotto Park

=== Second legs ===
11 February 2026	Union SG	4–1 (4–1 agg.)	Charleroi	Forest
20:30 CET	David 2'; Fuseini 51'; Sykes 85'; Florucz 90+4'	Report	Scheidler 5'	Stadium: Joseph Marien Stadium

12 February 2026	Antwerp	0–4 (1–4 agg.)	Anderlecht	Antwerp
20:30 CET		Report	Saliba 2'; Degreef 45+4'; De Cat 48'; Scott 85' (o.g.)	Stadium: Bosuilstadion

== Final ==
14 May 2026
15:00 CEST

Union SG	3−1 (a.e.t.)	Anderlecht
Mac Allister 74'; Fuseini 95'; Rodríguez 100'		Cvetković 82'

King Baudouin Stadium, Brussels
Referee: Bram Van Driessche
