= 2025–26 Belgian Division 1 =

Belgian Division 1
- Season: 2025–26
- Dates: 27 August 2025 – 24 May 2026
- Champions: VV: Hasselt; FFA: Virton
- Promoted: VV: Hasselt; FFA: Virton
- Relegated: VV: Diegem, Ninove; FFA: Namur, Schaerbeek, Stockay
- Matches: 201
- Goals: 658 (3.27 per match)

The 2025–26 Belgian Division 1 was the tenth season of the third-tier football league. It was the second season in which the division is split into two groups VV (Voetbal Vlaanderen) and ACFF (Association des Clubs Francophones de Football), the latter renaming itself to FFA (Football Francophone Amateur) in April 2026.

== Team changes ==
=== Out ===
The following teams were promoted at the end of the 2024–25 season:

- To Challenger Pro League:
  - VV: Jong KAA Gent
  - ACFF: Olympic Charleroi

The following teams were relegated at the end of the 2024–25 season:

- To Belgian Division 2:
  - VV: Cappellen, Heist, Young Reds Antwerp
  - ACFF: Binche, Tournai

=== In ===
The following team was relegated from the Challenger Pro League:

- No relegation

The following teams were promoted from the Belgian Division 2:

- VV group:
  - Roeselare (as champions)
  - Houtvenne (as champions)
  - Zelzate (lost via play-offs but promoted instead due to Jong Genk remain in second tier)
  - Diegem (via play-offs)
- FFA group:
  - Crossing Schaerbeek (as champions)
  - Meux (via play-offs)
  - Habay-la-Neuve (via play-offs)

== VV ==
Locations of the 2025–26 Belgian National Division 1 VV teams

=== League table ===
Pos	Team	Pld	W	D	L	GF	GA	GD	Pts	Qualification or relegation
1	Hasselt (Note: Hasselt was initially refused a license, which would have meant third-placed Roeselare would be promoted instead, as runners-up Knokke did not apply for a license. Hasselt however appealed the decision and were ultimately awarded a license.) (C, P)	30	19	5	6	76	28	48	62	Promotion to the Challenger Pro League
2	Knokke	30	19	4	7	56	44	12	61	
3	Roeselare	30	15	9	6	52	33	19	54	
4	Belisia	30	15	7	8	62	43	19	52	
5	Hoogstraten	30	14	9	7	54	42	12	51	
6	Thes	30	14	8	8	44	34	10	50	
7	Lyra-Lierse	30	12	7	11	45	44	1	43	
8	Dessel	30	11	6	13	61	65	−4	39	
9	Tienen	30	11	5	14	38	46	−8	38	
10	Jong Cercle^{U23}	30	10	8	12	41	53	−12	38	
11	Merelbeke	30	11	3	16	42	49	−7	36	
12	Zelzate	30	10	6	14	52	61	−9	36	
13	OH Leuven U-23^{U23}	30	10	3	17	56	64	−8	33	
14	Houtvenne	30	8	7	15	40	53	−13	31	
15	Diegem (R)	30	7	7	16	52	69	−17	28	Relegation to Division 2
16	Ninove (R)	30	5	4	21	40	83	−43	19	Relegation to Division 2

Rules for classification: 1) Points; 2) Matches won; 3) Goal difference; 4) Goals scored; 5) Away goals scored; 6) Away matches won.
(C) Champion; (P) Promoted; (R) Relegated

=== Results ===
Home \ Away	HAS	KNO	ROE	HOO	TES	BEL	LLB	DES	TIE	CER	MER	ZEL	HOU	DIE	OHL	NIN
Hasselt	—	4–0	2–0	5–0	0–2	2–2	4–2	1–0	3–0	0–1	5–0	0–0	5–0	3–2	2–1	4–1
Knokke	2–6	—	1–0	1–1	2–1	0–3	1–0	2–1	2–0	2–1	2–0	1–3	0–0	3–0	3–1	2–0
Roeselare	1–0	4–1	—	1–1	3–1	0–1	4–2	2–2	0–0	1–0	1–0	3–3	1–2	2–2	6–4	2–0
Hoogstraten	2–1	1–1	1–1	—	0–0	5–3	2–2	2–0	0–1	4–1	2–0	2–2	3–1	3–2	1–2	3–1
Thes	1–1	1–0	0–1	4–2	—	1–1	1–0	1–1	0–0	1–1	1–0	1–2	0–0	6–3	3–1	2–0
Belisia	0–0	2–3	0–0	2–1	3–0	—	0–0	3–0	0–2	2–6	1–4	5–0	1–4	3–2	2–1	2–3
Lyra-Lierse Berlaar	2–0	0–0	0–0	2–0	1–2	0–0	—	3–0	1–0	4–1	1–3	1–0	4–3	0–1	2–0	3–2
Dessel	2–7	4–3	3–4	1–3	2–3	3–2	5–2	—	1–1	2–2	2–1	3–1	3–2	1–1	4–1	2–0
Tienen	0–2	2–3	0–3	1–1	1–0	0–5	2–3	1–3	—	2–1	2–0	2–1	0–2	5–1	2–1	3–1
Jong Cercle	0–4	1–4	1–1	1–0	1–1	0–5	5–1	3–1	1–1	—	1–0	2–1	1–0	1–3	0–4	1–0
Merelbeke	4–1	2–3	1–3	0–2	2–0	0–1	2–4	1–1	2–1	2–1	—	2–0	2–1	1–1	2–1	1–1
Zelzate	0–2	2–3	2–3	1–2	1–3	3–3	0–0	3–2	0–3	3–2	2–1	—	0–3	1–1	4–3	2–0
Houtvenne	0–1	1–2	0–2	1–2	0–3	0–2	0–3	3–2	3–1	1–1	3–1	0–3	—	2–2	0–2	3–3
Diegem	1–3	2–3	0–2	0–3	0–2	2–3	2–0	3–4	2–1	1–1	1–4	3–2	1–1	—	2–4	5–0
OH Leuven U-23	1–7	1–2	1–0	3–3	4–1	1–2	2–0	3–0	3–2	0–0	1–3	1–2	1–1	1–3	—	1–4
Ninove	1–1	0–4	2–1	1–2	1–2	0–3	2–2	1–6	1–2	2–3	3–1	4–8	1–3	4–3	1–6	—

Updated to match(es) played on 26 April 2026. Source:
Legend: Blue = home team win; Yellow = draw; Red = away team win.

=== Season statistics ===
==== Top scorers ====
As of 12 April 2026

Rank	Player	Club	Goals
1	Jordy Peffer	Lyra-Lierse Berlaar	19
1	Stan Braem	Knokke	19
3	Mehdi Bounou	Hasselt	15
4	Fallou Fall	Thes	14
5	Nico Binst	Merelbeke	13
5	Drin Sula	Diegem	13
7	Lennert Hallaert	Zelzate	12
8	Tiemen Wijnen	Belisia	11
8	Timo Regouin	Hoogstraten	11
8	Senda Mukandila	Ninove	11
8	Daan Debouver	Roeselare	11
8	Seong-heon Baik	Houtvenne	11
8	Aron Sulejmani	Belisia	11
14	Tibe Vanhaeren	Hasselt	10
14	Andries Claes	Thes	10

9 goals (4 players)
- Lars Cooman (Knokke)
- Adrien Marchal (Tienen)
- Jordy Mathei (Houtvenne / Dessel)
- Dario Oger (Ninove)
8 goals (9 players)
- Nelson Balongo (Tienen / Belisia)
- Hasan Bulut (OH Leuven U-23)
- Jef Colman (Diegem)
- Daimy Deflem (Diegem)
- Tuur Dierckx (Hasselt)
- Livio Milts (Hasselt)
- Javan Ngoyi (Dessel)
- Sam Valcke (Hasselt)
- Endrit Voca (Hoogstraten)
7 goals (4 players)
- Matteo Heremans (OH Leuven U-23)
- Kyan Himpe (Roeselare)
- Alain Matoka (Hasselt)
- Arno Van Keilegom (Dessel)
6 goals (7 players)
- Wolf Ackx (Zelzate)
- Arne Cassaert (Hoogstraten)
- Tom Ghislain (Belisia)
- Joaquin Obambi (Jong Cercle)
- Fousseni Ouro-Sama (Knokke)
- Visar Shala (Zelzate)
- Jorn Vancamp (Dessel)
5 goals (12 players)
- Arthur Allemeersch (Belisia)
- Senne Ceulemans (Tienen)
- Søren Coens (Zelzate)
- Amadou Diallo (OH Leuven U-23)
- Tarik El Boutaibe (Merelbeke)
- Arthur Harinck (Roeselare)
- Malcolm Lohunanu-Mbasi (OH Leuven U-23)
- Loïc Masscho (Hasselt)
- Jeroen Meeuwis (Hoogstraten)
- Amardeep Singh (Tienen)
- Fabio Sposito (Dessel)
- Mathieu Troonbeeckx (Dessel)
4 goals (16 players)
- Yannis Augustijnen (Hoogstraten)
- Jef De Block (Zelzate)
- Jo Gilis (Houtvenne)
- Shadi Guellet (Jong Cercle)
- Tim Jeunen (Belisia)
- Viggo Martens (Jong Cercle)
- Xander Martlé (Jong Cercle)
- Cédric Mateso-Liongola (Thes)
- Ilias Mjahed (Zelzate)
- Beni Mpanzu (Jong Cercle / Hasselt)
- Aske Sampers (Knokke)
- Kenneth Schuermans (Houtvenne)
- Laurens Symons (Lyra-Lierse Berlaar)
- Victor Vanden Driessche (OH Leuven U-23)
- Henri Van Marcke (Roeselare)
- Ruben Vanraefelghem (Knokke)
3 goals (28 players)
- Richard Antwi Manu (Merelbeke)
- Jasper Beyens (Roeselare)
- Alessandro Bongiorno (Belisia)
- Martijn Brandt (Hoogstraten)
- Aboubacar Conte (OH Leuven U-23)
- Jilke De Coninck (Zelzate)
- Lorenzo De Geyndt (Ninove)
- Jordy De Koker (Diegem)
- Fries Deschilder (Roeselare)
- Ayoub El Harrak (Tienen)
- Seppe Geukens (Dessel)
- Maxime Gody (Diegem)
- Donovan Habbas (Zelzate)
- Noel Kenesei (OH Leuven U-23)
- Seppe Kil (Lyra-Lierse Berlaar)
- Elhadji Koné (Jong Cercle)
- Maxime Mauën (Diegem)
- Liam McAlinney (OH Leuven U-23)
- Jesse Mputu (Ninove)
- Sebastian Murru (OH Leuven U-23)
- Oscar N'Guettia (Merelbeke)
- Sander Rau (Dessel)
- Olivier Romero Gomez (Ninove)
- Emile Samyn (Roeselare)
- Mathias Schils (Lyra-Lierse Berlaar)
- Yannick Vandersmissen (Dessel)
- Lilian Vergeylen (Knokke)
- Ruben Verheyen (Hoogstraten)
2 goals (27 players)
- Atilgan Babacan (Diegem)
- Sam Behaeghe (Jong Cercle)
- Christian Bello Rivero (Merelbeke)
- Joshua De Rycke (Zelzate)
- Justin Hallaert (Roeselare)
- Jarno Jourquin (Ninove / Hasselt)
- Mitchel Keulen (Thes)
- Jordi Maus (Belisia)
- Jonathan Mfumu (Hoogstraten)
- Mohamed Moatassim (Diegem)
- Justin Munezero (Hasselt)
- Tomas Muyldermans (Lyra-Lierse Berlaar)
- Joeri Poelmans (Houtvenne)
- Merijn Rogiers (Merelbeke)
- Hannes Smolders (Dessel)
- Jiri Struyf (Lyra-Lierse Berlaar)
- Iebe Swers (Thes)
- Cheick Thiam (Hasselt)
- Falke Vandecaetsbeek (Belisia)
- Paco Van Den Bogaert (Lyra-Lierse Berlaar)
- Arne Van Den Eynde (Merelbeke)
- Chike Van De Ven (OH Leuven U-23)
- Senne Van Dooren (Hoogstraten)
- Lucas Vankerkhoven (Hasselt)
- Daan Vekemans (Houtvenne)
- Niels Verburgh (Hasselt)
- Rens Verhooghe (Roeselare)
1 goal (89 players)
- Mohamed Yassine Azzouz (OH Leuven U-23)
- Alama Bayo (Jong Cercle)
- Samih Belfaqir (Hoogstraten)
- Quinten Bert (Jong Cercle)
- Mohamed Berzoimi Babtich (Houtvenne)
- Paul-Césaire Boroto (Tienen)
- Quinten Boudry (Zelzate)
- Abdoul Salam Boulhassane (Tienen)
- Mohamed Boussadia (Knokke)
- Yari Brachet (Knokke)
- Dré Callens (Jong Cercle)
- Ilkan Cavus (Houtvenne)
- Lukas da Cruz (Belisia)
- Stan De Baillie (Jong Cercle)
- Nathan De Raes (Ninove)
- Jari De Vriendt (Ninove)
- Stef de Wijs (Hoogstraten)
- Nelson Egah (Houtvenne)
- Rayan El Bahri (Jong Cercle)
- Mehdi El Ghraichi (Tienen)
- Ilias El Hamdaoui (Zelzate)
- Mouad Emhandi (Diegem)
- Ephraim Eshele (Tienen)
- Sofiane Et-Taïbi (Houtvenne)
- Lucca Ferrera (Knokke)
- Enzo Geerts (Houtvenne)
- Mathéo Gérard (OH Leuven U-23)
- Sebbe Gheerardyns (Jong Cercle)
- Noah Gijdé (Jong Cercle)
- Per Gordts (Merelbeke)
- Saïfedin Haj Abdallah (Houtvenne)
- Nick Havermans (Hoogstraten)
- Jitse Hermans (Diegem)
- Nick Hulsmans (Thes)
- Olivier Janezic (Houtvenne)
- Pieter Jochmans (Thes)
- Faysel Kasmi (Dessel)
- Bryang Kayo (OH Leuven U-23)
- Robbe Kil (Lyra-Lierse Berlaar)
- Krys Kouassi (Jong Cercle)
- Jerôme Kroonen (Hasselt)
- Mert Kurt (Merelbeke)
- Derrick Kyere (Houtvenne)
- Gyamfi Kyeremeh (Merelbeke)
- Siebren Lathouwers (Belisia)
- Rune Libbrecht (Roeselare)
- Andy Lokando (Diegem)
- Mathijs Maerten (Roeselare)
- Lorenzo Matarrese (Ninove)
- Ephraïm Matuasilua (Thes)
- Yohan Mboko (OH Leuven U-23)
- Maxim Meert (Ninove)
- Roméo Monticelli (OH Leuven U-23)
- Hyacinth Ogonna Okoro (Houtvenne)
- Terry Osei-Berkoe (Ninove)
- Abdoul Kader Ouattara (Jong Cercle)
- Tom Panepinto (Tienen)
- Nils Pierre (Knokke)
- Beau Ponnet (Merelbeke)
- Lex Predhomme (Hoogstraten)
- Zenz Raaymakers (Zelzate)
- Bent Reijniers (Lyra-Lierse Berlaar)
- Vic Seurynck (Merelbeke)
- Diafa Soumah (Tienen)
- Elaïjah Stalmans (Tienen)
- Tibeau Swinnen (Thes)
- Nicolas Thienpont (Merelbeke)
- Akram Tourki (Lyra-Lierse Berlaar)
- Ono Vanackere (Jong Cercle)
- Mats Van Ballaer (Dessel)
- Kobe Vande Cauter (Tienen)
- Zyon Vandekerkhove (Houtvenne)
- Tijs Vandendungen (Dessel)
- Senne Vanderhaegen (Jong Cercle)
- Constant Vande Velde (Merelbeke)
- Niels Van De Vel (Hoogstraten)
- Milan Vandeweghe (Jong Cercle)
- Robbe Van Diest (Houtvenne)
- Mats Van Genechten (Thes)
- Xander Van Hout (Dessel)
- Ike Vanleenhove (Knokke)
- Gillis Verhelst (Merelbeke)
- Jouk Vermeeren (Hoogstraten)
- Maxim Volant (Lyra-Lierse Berlaar)
- Koen Weuts (Lyra-Lierse Berlaar)
- Lucas Witters (Houtvenne)
- Bastien Yondjouen (Zelzate)
- Adam Zaânan (Ninove)

== FFA ==
Locations of the 2025–26 Belgian National Division 1 FFA teams

=== Regular season ===
==== League table ====
Pos	Team	Pld	W	D	L	GF	GA	GD	Pts	Qualification or relegation
1	Tubize-Braine	22	14	5	3	49	20	29	47	Qualification for Promotion play-offs
2	Virton	22	14	5	3	61	35	26	47	Qualification for Promotion play-offs
3	Mons	22	13	5	4	42	17	25	44	Qualification for Promotion play-offs
4	Meux	22	10	6	6	38	28	10	36	Qualification for Promotion play-offs
5	Habay-la-Neuve	22	10	6	6	38	35	3	36	Qualification for Promotion play-offs
6	Rochefort	22	9	4	9	33	40	−7	31	Qualification for Promotion play-offs
7	Zébra Élites	22	9	3	10	36	38	−2	30	Qualification for Relegation play-offs
8	Stockay	22	7	5	10	22	35	−13	26	Qualification for Relegation play-offs
9	Union SG B	22	7	3	12	36	45	−9	24	Qualification for Relegation play-offs
10	Union Namur	22	4	4	14	30	50	−20	16	Qualification for Relegation play-offs
11	Crossing Schaerbeek	22	4	4	14	24	44	−20	16	Qualification for Relegation play-offs
12	SL16 FC	22	3	6	13	25	47	−22	15	Qualification for Relegation play-offs

Source: Nationaal : 1st klasse ACFF (in French)
Rules for classification: 1) Points; 2) Matches won; 3) Goal difference; 4) Goals scored; 5) Away goals scored; 6) Away matches won.

==== Results ====
Home \ Away	TUB	VIR	MON	MEU	HAB	ROC	ZEB	STO	USG	UNA	SCH	STL
Tubize-Braine	—	2–0	1–0	4–1	0–1	1–0	2–3	2–2	1–1	4–1	4–0	4–0
Virton	3–3	—	3–1	4–1	3–0	2–2	2–1	2–0	1–2	3–2	5–2	5–1
Mons	1–1	0–1	—	1–1	2–0	5–0	2–0	2–0	2–1	4–0	2–1	5–1
Meux	0–0	1–1	0–2	—	5–2	0–1	1–3	2–1	4–0	1–0	2–0	4–0
Habay-la-Neuve	2–1	6–2	0–0	1–1	—	2–5	0–3	2–1	3–2	2–0	1–0	3–3
Rochefort	1–5	0–4	3–1	0–3	1–0	—	1–1	1–2	3–2	2–1	0–2	2–2
Zébra Élites	2–3	2–2	1–2	3–3	2–3	2–1	—	2–1	0–2	4–1	4–2	0–2
Stockay	0–2	2–2	0–0	0–2	0–3	0–3	1–0	—	1–0	0–4	4–2	1–0
Union SG B	0–3	2–5	1–2	1–1	1–4	4–0	4–1	2–2	—	2–4	0–1	2–1
Union Namur	1–5	2–5	0–4	1–2	1–1	1–1	3–0	0–1	1–2	—	2–1	1–2
Crossing Schaerbeek	0–1	1–3	2–2	2–1	0–0	0–5	0–1	1–2	1–3	3–3	—	1–1
SL16 FC	1–2	2–3	0–2	1–2	2–2	0–1	0–1	1–1	4–2	1–1	0–2	—

Source: Nationaal : 1st klasse ACFF (in French)
Legend: Blue = home team win; Yellow = draw; Red = away team win.

=== Play-offs ===
In the play-offs, teams start with half the points gained during the regular season (rounded up). As the points of Rochefort, Tubize-Braine, and Virton (in the promotion play-offs) and SL16 FC (in the relegation play-offs) were rounded-up, they will be ranked below the other teams in case there is a tie on points after conclusion of the play-offs.

==== Promotion play-offs ====
Pos	Team	Pld	W	D	L	GF	GA	GD	Pts	Qualification or relegation	VIR	MON	TUB	MEU	HAB	ROC
1	Virton (C, P)	10	7	0	3	18	13	5	45	Promoted to Challenger Pro League	—	0–3	1–0	2–0	2–0	2–1
2	Mons	10	6	3	1	19	8	11	43		0–2	—	0–0	3–0	0–0	3–0
3	Tubize-Braine	10	4	4	2	13	11	2	40		2–1	2–2	—	1–0	2–0	3–2
4	Meux	10	4	1	5	15	16	−1	31		1–2	3–4	2–2	—	3–1	3–0
5	Habay-la-Neuve	10	3	1	6	9	15	−6	28		3–1	0–1	2–0	1–2	—	1–0
6	Rochefort	10	1	1	8	12	23	−11	20		3–5	1–3	1–1	0–1	4–1	—

Source: Nationaal : 1ste Nationale acff PO+ (in Dutch)
Legend: Blue = home team win; Yellow = draw; Red = away team win.
Rules for classification: 1) Points; 2) Points after deduction of possible half point gained through rounding; 3) Matches won.
(C) Champion; (P) Promoted

==== Relegation play-offs ====
Pos	Team	Pld	W	D	L	GF	GA	GD	Pts	Qualification or relegation	USG^{U23}	ZEB^{U23}	STL^{U23}	STO	SCH	UNA
1	Union SG B^{U23}	10	6	2	2	18	8	10	32		—	0–3	1–1	2–1	3–0	5–0 (Note: The match played on 8 March 2026 was stopped after 77 minutes played at a score of 3–0, following a severe leg injury of Jérémie Mugabo. It was decided to replay the match in full, on 4 April 2026, which ended 5–0.)
2	Zébra Élites^{U23}	10	5	1	4	13	13	0	31		0–0	—	0–2	3–2	2–0	0–3
3	SL16 FC^{U23}	10	5	3	2	14	9	5	26		1–0	1–0	—	3–0	1–1	3–1
4	Stockay (R)	10	3	1	6	16	18	−2	23	Relegated to Division 2	1–3	0–1	3–0	—	2–2	3–0
5	Crossing Schaerbeek (R)	10	3	3	4	15	19	−4	20	Relegated to Division 2	0–1	2–3	3–2	2–1	—	3–2
6	Union Namur (R)	10	2	2	6	14	23	−9	16	Relegated to Division 2	1–3	3–1	0–0	2–3	2–2	—

Source: Nationaal : 1ste Nationale acff PO– (in Dutch)
Legend: Blue = home team win; Yellow = draw; Red = away team win.
Rules for classification: 1) Points; 2) Points after deduction of possible half point gained through rounding; 3) Matches won.
(R) Relegated

=== Season statistics ===
==== Top scorers ====
As of 30 November 2025

Rank	Player	Club	Goals
1	Dylan De Belder	Mons	14
2	Tyron Crame	Tubize-Braine	9
2	Mayron De Almeida	Virton	9
2	Ismaël El Omari	Tubize-Braine	9
2	Antoine Mazure	Habay-la-Neuve	9
2	Alexandre Stanic	Zébra Élites	9
7	Axel Lauwrensens	Tubize-Braine	7
8	Nelson Azevedo-Janelas	Rochefort	6
8	Jordan Botaka	Union SG B	6
8	Emmanuel Mballa Amougou	Virton	6

5 goals (3 players)
- Yacine Bentayeb (Mons)
- Justin Gaux (Meux)
- Oumar Traoré (Union Namur)
4 goals (15 players)
- Paolino Bertaccini (Union Namur)
- Loris Brogno (Mons)
- Esteban Casagolda (Crossing Schaerbeek)
- Maxime Cavelier (Stockay)
- Yoann Cissé (Zébra Élites)
- Antoine De Bodt (Mons)
- Kim Detienne (Meux)
- Lucien Gauchet (Meux)
- Dieudonné Lwangi (Union Namur)
- René Mitongo (SL16 FC)
- Zakaria Nadrani (Tubize-Braine)
- Afonso N'Salambi (SL16 FC)
- Nicolas Rajsel (Tubize-Braine)
- Axel Rouffignon (Meux)
- Valentin Thomas (Habay-la-Neuve)
3 goals (12 players)
- Mohamed Asri (Union SG B)
- Florent Devresse (Habay-la-Neuve)
- Modeste Duku (Virton)
- Sekou Keita (Union SG B)
- Sullivan Lakhamy (Virton)
- Michael Lallemand (Stockay)
- Lucas Lamotte (Habay-la-Neuve)
- James Nam (SL16 FC)
- Gabriel Pires De Carvalho (Union SG B)
- Andel Pascal Sarr (Rochefort)
- Alvin Segbia (Meux)
- Sam Sylla (Stockay)
2 goals (24 players)
- Gaëtan Arib (Virton)
- Leslie Bamona Lubelu (Mons)
- Quentin Benaets (Zébra Élites)
- Tibère Bridoux (Mons)
- Lamine Buhanga (Virton)
- Mathieu Cornet (Rochefort)
- Mohammed Dassy (Union SG B)
- Mamadou Gueye (Crossing Schaerbeek)
- Valentin Guillaume (Virton)
- Anas Hammas (SL16 FC)
- Nathan Huygevelde (Union SG B)
- Gaël Kakudji (Crossing Schaerbeek)
- Franck Koré (Habay-la-Neuve)
- Jérémy Kumbi (Rochefort)
- Yannick Loemba (Union Namur)
- Nathan Monkoy (Zébra Élites)
- Kilian Ngoumou (Habay-la-Neuve)
- Stevy Okitokandjo (Crossing Schaerbeek)
- Grégory Perseo (Rochefort)
- Noé Pierot (Union Namur)
- Valentin Sanson (Virton)
- Alessio Sternon (Stockay)
- Victor Trento (Habay-la-Neuve)
- Mathéo Vandaele (Habay-la-Neuve)
1 goal (42 players)
- Walid Aabdi (Union Namur)
- Jawad Absisan (Crossing Schaerbeek)
- Axel Benoît (Mons)
- Soulaimane Berradi (Union SG B)
- Loic Besson (Stockay)
- Wissem Bouhadiche (Virton)
- Alexandro Calut (SL16 FC)
- Miguel Dachelet (Stockay)
- Louis Delhaye (Tubize-Braine)
- Shean Garlito (Tubize-Braine)
- Liam Genève (Virton)
- Victor Gorny (Mons)
- Maxime Guillaume (Virton)
- Jonathan Hendrickx (Rochefort)
- Lucas Kalala (Stockay)
- Onésime Kalonji (SL16 FC)
- Sahel Kibour (Rochefort)
- Ange-Gabriel Kokora (SL16 FC)
- Mamoudou Koumé (Union Namur)
- Oleg Kuchinska (Tubize-Braine)
- Victor Letêcheur (Rochefort)
- Amaury Lotte (Meux)
- Thomas Lutte (Zébra Élites)
- Amaury Mabika (Crossing Schaerbeek)
- Tao Mampuya (Crossing Schaerbeek)
- Jean Mathieu (Meux)
- Daan Matterne (Crossing Schaerbeek)
- Teddy Mézague (Virton)
- Lars Montegnies (Mons)
- Jeremie Mugabo (Union Namur)
- Anas Namri (Virton)
- Matteo Noto (Zébra Élites)
- Abdramane Ouedraogo (SL16 FC)
- Amaury Patris (Union Namur)
- Lorenzo Prso (Tubize-Braine)
- Quentin Ronvaux (Stockay)
- Francisco Rosado (Union SG B)
- Serhat Tepe (Tubize-Braine)
- Allan Tshimanga (Tubize-Braine)
- Cyril Van Hyfte (Meux)
- Thomas Vanhecke (Mons)
- Ben Yagan (Crossing Schaerbeek)

== See also ==
- 2025–26 Belgian Pro League
- 2025–26 Challenger Pro League
- 2025–26 Belgian Division 2
- 2025–26 Belgian Division 3
- 2025–26 Belgian Cup
