= Bafdili =

Bafdili is a Moroccan surname. Notable people with the surname include:

- Bilal Bafdili (born 2004), Belgian footballer
- Zaïd Bafdili (born 2007), Belgian footballer
