= 2024–25 Belgian Division 2 =

Belgian Division 2
- Season: 2024–25
- Dates: 25 August 2024 – 4 May 2025
- Promoted: VV A: Roeselare, Zelzate; VV B: Houtvenne, Diegem; ACFF: Crossing Schaerbeek, Habay-la-Neuve, Meux
- Relegated: VV A: Dikkelvenne; Jong Westerlo; Olsa Brakel; Voorde-Appelterre; VV B: Esperanza Pelt; Lille; Wezel Sport; ACFF: Eupen U23, La Louvière Centre, Seraing B (Discontinued), Verlaine
- Matches: 786

The 2024–25 Belgian Division 2 was the ninth season of the division in its current format, placed at the fourth-tier of football in Belgium.

== Team changes ==
From this season on, the two VV divisions were reduced from 18 to 16 teams, resulting in four fewer teams entering the division than leaving it.

=== In ===
- The champions from each of the four divisions of the 2023–24 Belgian Division 3 were directly promoted: Westhoek (VV A), Termien (VV B), Onhaye (ACFF A) and Union Hutoise (ACFF B).
- Also promoted via promotion play-offs were Aywaille, Berg en Dal, Crossing Schaerbeek, Habay-la-Neuve, Manageoise, Ostiches-Ath, Raeren-Eynatten, Pelt, Roeselare and Wellen.
- To increase the number of U23 teams in this division:
  - Seraing II were also promoted from the Belgian Division 3, and
  - Eupen U23, Jong STVV and Jong Westerlo came over from the U23 leagues.

=== Out ===
- While Eendracht Aalst became champions of the VV A division, the club was not awarded a license and hence relegated to the Belgian Provincial Leagues.
- Ninove was promoted from the VV A division to take up the vacated promotion spot by Eendracht Aalst.
- Belisia Bilzen was promoted to the 2023–24 Belgian National Division 1 as champion of the VV B division.
- Mons was promoted as champion of the ACFF division.
- Also promoted via promotion play-offs were Binche, Hasselt, Jong Cercle, Lyra-Lierse Berlaar, Merelbeke, Rochefort, Tournai and Tubize-Braine.
- Extra available spots at the division above were filled by Stockay and Union SG B.
- City Pirates, Hamoir, Londerzeel, Mandel United, Overijse, Rebecq and Wetteren were all directly relegated to the 2024–25 Belgian Division 3 based on their finishing position.
- Finally, Warnant voluntarily restarted at the bottom of the Belgian football pyramid.

=== Division switch ===
The initial proposition placed Houtvenne together with Jong Westerlo in the VV B division, with Houtvenne cooperating strongly with Westerlo (having loaned several players over the last few seasons), other clubs objected and insisted Houtvenne and the U23 team of Westerlo would be placed in different division to avoid any probability of matchfixing. As a result, Jong Westerlo moved to the VV A division, swapping places with Jong KV Mechelen.

== Belgian Division 2 VV A ==
Locations of the 2024–25 Belgian Division 2 VV A teams

=== League table ===
Pos	Team	Pld	W	D	L	GF	GA	GD	Pts	Qualification or relegation
1	Roeselare (C, P)	30	20	5	5	53	24	+29	65	Promotion to the 2025–26 Belgian National Division 1
2	Oostkamp (Note: Oostkamp did not obtain a license for Division 1 and therefore did not qualify for the promotion play-offs.)	30	17	4	9	55	43	+12	55	
3	Zelzate (P)	30	15	9	6	70	43	+27	54	Qualification for the Promotion play-offs VV
4	Harelbeke	30	15	9	6	59	44	+15	54	Qualification for the Promotion play-offs VV
5	Oudenaarde (Note: Oudenaarde did not obtain a license for Division 1 and therefore did not qualify for the promotion play-offs.)	30	14	7	9	52	47	+5	49	
6	Dikkelvenne (Note: On December 10, 2024, Dikkelvenne announced that due to financial pressures they had opted to voluntarily relegate back to the Belgian Provincial Leagues) (R)	30	13	10	7	56	38	+18	49	Relegation to the Belgian Provincial Leagues
7	Jong Essevee	30	13	3	14	58	48	+10	42	Qualification for the Promotion play-offs VV
8	Westhoek	30	11	8	11	40	45	−5	41	
9	Petegem	30	11	7	12	47	55	−8	40	
10	Racing Gent	30	10	7	13	50	61	−11	37	
11	Lebbeke	30	8	12	10	52	54	−2	36	
12	Jong Westerlo (Note: The parent team K.V.C. Westerlo announced that they would be discontinuing their U23 team at the end of the season.) (R)	30	9	6	15	40	47	−7	33	Team discontinued
13	Torhout	30	8	8	14	44	59	−15	32	
14	Gullegem	30	8	7	15	46	55	−9	31	Qualification for the Relegation play-offs
15	Olsa Brakel (R)	30	7	7	16	40	65	−25	28	Relegation to the 2025–26 Belgian Division 3
16	Voorde-Appelterre (R)	30	5	3	22	33	67	−34	18	Relegation to the 2025–26 Belgian Division 3

Source: vbal4
Rules for classification: 1) Points; 2) Matches won; 3) Goal difference; 4) Goals scored; 5) Away matches won; 6) Goal difference in away matches; 7) Away goals scored.
(C) Champions; (P) Promoted; (R) Relegated

=== Period champions ===
- First period: Roeselare (24 Points)
- Second period: Roeselare (22 Points)
- Third period: Oostkamp (26 Points)

=== Results ===
Home \ Away	ROE	OOS	ZEL	HAR	OUD	DIK	ESS	WES	PET	GEN	LEB	JWE	TOR	GUL	BRA	VOO
Roeselare	—	2–0	3–1	1–1	2–0	0–0	2–1	2–0	2–0	1–2	2–0	2–1	2–1	3–2	3–0	3–2
Oostkamp	1–0	—	1–2	1–1	2–1	2–0	3–1	0–3	2–1	3–3	5–3	3–0	1–0	2–1	4–5	4–0
Zelzate	3–2	2–4	—	0–0	1–2	2–1	4–1	4–0	5–0	3–1	1–3	3–3	4–0	1–1	5–1	4–2
Harelbeke	0–4	3–2	1–0	—	1–3	4–3	2–1	3–0	2–2	1–1	2–3	2–1	1–2	5–4	4–1	2–0
Oudenaarde	1–3	3–1	2–2	2–2	—	2–2	1–0	2–0	1–3	1–1	2–3	2–1	4–1	1–0	3–2	3–1
Dikkelvenne	1–0	3–0	2–0	2–2	2–0	—	2–4	4–0	2–4	3–0	2–2	3–2	1–1	0–0	1–0	3–0
Jong Essevee	2–1	0–1	1–2	1–3	2–0	2–0	—	1–1	2–1	2–1	6–1	1–2	3–1	4–0	2–0	5–0
Westhoek	0–1	0–1	2–2	2–4	2–0	1–1	2–2	—	3–4	1–0	0–0	1–2	3–2	2–1	3–0	1–0
Petegem	1–1	1–2	1–2	1–4	1–1	1–2	4–3	1–1	—	3–2	0–0	3–2	2–1	2–1	2–2	1–0
Racing Gent	1–3	2–1	0–2	1–0	1–3	3–3	4–3	0–3	4–0	—	3–3	2–4	2–2	3–2	0–1	4–1
Lebbeke	1–1	1–1	1–1	2–2	1–3	1–3	1–1	1–2	1–1	1–2	—	1–1	1–2	2–2	4–0	0–4
Jong Westerlo	0–1	1–1	1–1	0–1	0–1	2–2	0–1	3–0	2–0	1–2	0–3	—	1–1	3–1	3–2	0–1
Torhout	2–3	1–2	1–4	2–1	2–2	2–1	2–3	0–2	0–3	1–1	4–2	0–1	—	1–1	3–1	1–1
Gullegem	0–1	2–1	1–4	0–2	1–4	0–0	3–1	2–2	2–1	5–0	1–3	3–1	3–4	—	2–1	1–0
Olsa Brakel	0–2	1–3	2–2	1–1	2–2	1–2	1–0	2–2	2–1	1–2	0–5	3–1	1–1	0–0	—	4–2
Voorde-Appelterre	0–0	0–1	3–3	1–2	5–0	0–5	3–2	0–1	1–2	3–2	0–2	0–1	2–3	1–4	0–3	—

Source: Nationaal : 1st klasse (in Dutch)
Legend: Blue = home team win; Yellow = draw; Red = away team win.

== Belgian Division 2 VV B ==
Locations of the 2024–25 Belgian Division 2 VV B teams

=== League table ===
Pos	Team	Pld	W	D	L	GF	GA	GD	Pts	Qualification or relegation
1	Houtvenne (C, P)	30	19	8	3	69	27	+42	65	Promotion to the 2025–26 Belgian National Division 1
2	Rupel Boom	30	19	8	3	53	20	+33	65	Qualification for the Promotion play-offs VV
3	Diegem (P)	30	18	8	4	66	33	+33	62	Qualification for the Promotion play-offs VV
4	Termien (Note: Termien did not apply for a Division 1 license and therefore did not qualify for the promotion play-offs.)	30	14	6	10	59	49	+10	48	
5	Jong KV Mechelen	30	13	7	10	56	44	+12	46	Qualification for the Promotion play-offs VV
6	Racing Mechelen	30	12	10	8	47	45	+2	46	Qualification for the Promotion play-offs VV
7	Hades	30	13	5	12	40	42	−2	44	
8	Berg en Dal	30	12	5	13	42	48	−6	41	
9	Jong STVV	30	8	10	12	50	43	+7	34	
10	Berchem	30	8	10	12	37	49	−12	34	
11	Tongeren	30	8	8	14	27	41	−14	32	
12	Wellen	30	8	8	14	37	56	−19	32	
13	Bocholt	30	8	7	15	50	59	−9	31	
14	Lille (R)	30	9	3	18	40	67	−27	30	Qualification for the Relegation play-offs
15	Pelt (R)	30	6	11	13	35	45	−10	29	Relegation to the 2025–26 Belgian Division 3
16	Wezel (R)	30	4	8	18	38	78	−40	20	Relegation to the 2025–26 Belgian Division 3

Source: vbal4
Rules for classification: 1) Points; 2) Matches won; 3) Goal difference; 4) Goals scored; 5) Away matches won; 6) Goal difference in away matches; 7) Away goals scored.
(C) Champions; (P) Promoted; (R) Relegated

=== Period champions ===
- First period: Rupel Boom (23 Points)
- Second period: Termien (23 Points)
- Third period: Houtvenne (26 Points)

=== Results ===
Home \ Away	HOU	RUP	DIE	TER	KVM	RCM	HAD	BED	STR	BER	TON	WEL	BOC	LIL	PEL	WEZ
Houtvenne	—	1–1	1–2	4–0	1–1	6–2	1–0	4–0	2–0	2–0	1–1	4–1	4–1	4–0	3–1	4–0
Rupel Boom	3–1	—	4–1	2–0	4–0	0–0	0–3	0–1	2–2	1–2	3–1	4–0	2–1	2–0	2–0	3–1
Diegem	1–1	0–1	—	2–3	3–0	0–0	3–1	4–1	2–0	1–1	0–1	1–1	3–2	1–0	3–2	9–1
Termien	2–3	0–2	1–1	—	1–2	3–1	1–0	2–3	1–1	4–0	2–1	2–0	6–1	2–0	3–1	0–2
Jong KV Mechelen	1–2	1–2	2–2	5–1	—	3–0	0–0	3–1	3–2	4–1	0–1	0–0	3–0	1–3	1–0	5–1
Racing Mechelen	0–0	0–2	1–2	3–3	1–1	—	1–1	1–3	4–2	3–0	3–0	2–1	2–2	2–3	2–2	2–1
Hades	1–2	0–1	1–3	1–2	1–3	3–1	—	0–2	2–0	0–0	2–1	4–2	2–1	4–0	2–1	1–0
Berg en Dal	1–5	1–2	0–1	3–1	3–0	0–1	3–0	—	0–1	1–2	1–1	2–2	1–1	2–0	1–0	1–4
Jong STVV	2–1	0–0	1–1	3–4	1–1	2–3	6–0	4–1	—	1–1	0–1	1–2	4–0	8–3	0–0	3–0
Berchem	1–2	1–1	3–4	2–1	2–2	1–1	2–3	1–1	0–0	—	0–1	3–1	1–2	0–2	0–2	0–2
Tongeren	0–2	1–1	2–4	0–0	1–3	1–2	0–1	1–1	3–1	0–1	—	1–0	0–0	4–2	1–2	1–0
Wellen	1–1	0–0	1–3	1–2	2–1	1–3	1–2	4–0	2–1	1–1	1–0	—	1–0	2–1	0–4	4–4
Bocholt	1–3	1–2	1–1	2–4	3–0	1–2	2–0	0–4	1–1	2–3	4–0	1–2	—	6–3	2–1	3–3
Lille	1–1	0–3	0–6	2–2	1–4	0–0	0–2	1–2	2–0	1–3	2–0	3–0	0–2	—	4–0	3–2
Pelt	1–1	0–2	0–1	1–1	3–2	0–1	2–2	2–0	0–2	1–1	0–0	2–2	1–1	2–1	—	2–2
Wezel	1–2	1–1	0–1	0–5	1–4	1–3	1–1	0–2	1–1	2–4	2–2	3–1	0–6	0–2	2–2	—

Source: Nationaal : 1st klasse (in Dutch)
Legend: Blue = home team win; Yellow = draw; Red = away team win.

== Belgian Division 2 ACFF ==
Locations of the 2024–25 Belgian Division 2 ACFF teams

=== League table ===
Pos	Team	Pld	W	D	L	GF	GA	GD	Pts	Qualification or relegation
1	Crossing Schaerbeek (C, P)	34	22	10	2	61	27	+34	76	Promotion to the 2025–26 Belgian National Division 1
2	Meux (P)	34	21	9	4	68	31	+37	72	Qualification for the Promotion play-offs ACFF
3	Onhaye	34	19	7	8	51	33	+18	64	Qualification for the Promotion play-offs ACFF
4	Habay-la-Neuve (P)	34	18	6	10	49	30	+19	60	Qualification for the Promotion play-offs ACFF
5	Acren-Lessines (Note: Acren-Lessines did not obtain a license for Division 1 and therefore did not qualify for the promotion play-offs.)	34	16	9	9	53	39	+14	57	
6	Verviers	34	15	8	11	43	32	+11	53	Qualification for the Promotion play-offs ACFF
7	Raeren-Eynatten	34	15	7	12	37	36	+1	52	
8	La Calamine	34	14	8	12	55	45	+10	50	
9	Seraing B (R)	34	12	8	14	45	51	−6	44	Team discontinued from U-23
10	Jette	34	11	11	12	40	49	−9	44	
11	Manageoise	34	12	7	15	47	62	−15	43	
12	Aywaille	34	12	6	16	48	55	−7	42	
13	Ganshoren	34	10	11	13	45	49	−4	41	
14	Union Hutoise	34	9	10	15	47	54	−7	37	
15	Ostiches-Ath	34	9	8	17	40	57	−17	35	
16	Verlaine (R)	34	8	4	22	41	63	−22	28	Relegation to the 2025–26 Belgian Division 3
17	La Louvière Centre (R)	34	6	7	21	39	67	−28	25	Relegation to the 2025–26 Belgian Division 3
18	Eupen U23 (R)	34	6	6	22	38	67	−29	24	Relegation to the 2025–26 Belgian Division 3

Source: vbal4
Rules for classification: 1) Points; 2) Matches won; 3) Goal difference; 4) Goals scored; 5) Away matches won; 6) Goal difference in away matches; 7) Away goals scored.
(C) Champions; (P) Promoted; (R) Relegated

=== Period champions ===
- First period: Meux (24 Points)
- Second period: Crossing Schaerbeek (26 Points)
- Third period: Crossing Schaerbeek (28 Points)

=== Results ===
Home \ Away	SCH	MEU	ONH	HAB	A-L	VEV	R-E	LAC	SER	JET	MAN	AYW	GAN	HUY	O-A	VER	LAL	EUP
Crossing Schaerbeek	—	2–2	0–1	2–0	1–1	0–0	2–0	1–0	3–1	3–3	2–0	3–3	0–0	2–0	4–3	0–0	1–1	1–0
Meux	1–1	—	0–1	2–1	1–1	3–0	4–3	2–1	5–0	2–0	4–0	2–1	4–2	3–1	3–1	3–0	2–0	5–1
Onhaye	2–3	0–0	—	2–1	4–1	2–1	3–0	1–1	2–1	2–1	3–1	1–2	2–0	2–1	1–1	2–1	1–0	1–2
Habay-la-Neuve	0–1	0–2	1–0	—	1–0	1–1	1–0	2–0	2–0	3–1	1–0	0–1	0–1	4–2	1–2	1–0	2–2	0–1
Acren-Lessines	1–1	2–1	4–1	0–1	—	1–0	0–0	0–2	0–2	0–1	2–3	3–2	1–1	3–2	2–1	2–1	5–1	2–0
Verviers	1–2	1–2	1–1	0–1	4–2	—	0–2	4–0	1–1	1–1	1–2	0–1	1–1	2–1	2–0	1–0	0–1	2–0
Raeren-Eynatten	0–3	1–0	0–0	0–2	2–1	3–4	—	2–0	2–0	0–0	0–1	1–1	1–1	1–4	0–0	1–0	2–0	2–0
La Calamine	0–2	3–0	1–2	0–1	0–0	0–0	3–1	—	2–2	2–1	4–0	2–0	0–3	1–1	1–1	6–1	5–2	1–0
Seraing B	0–2	0–1	2–1	4–1	1–1	0–2	0–1	3–2	—	1–0	0–2	2–0	3–3	3–2	6–1	0–0	2–0	0–0
Jette	0–3	1–1	0–1	1–1	0–3	0–1	2–0	2–1	2–1	—	1–1	1–0	0–0	0–1	2–1	3–2	2–1	1–1
Manageoise	0–5	0–0	2–1	2–5	1–2	1–2	0–2	2–2	6–2	1–1	—	4–1	2–2	2–1	2–3	3–0	1–1	2–1
Aywaille	1–2	2–2	0–1	1–3	0–0	0–1	1–4	3–1	2–1	2–2	3–0	—	4–0	2–2	1–2	1–2	3–2	1–0
Ganshoren	0–1	0–1	1–1	1–1	0–0	1–1	3–0	0–2	1–2	1–3	2–0	4–1	—	2–0	0–1	1–2	2–0	1–4
Union Hutoise	3–1	1–1	1–1	1–1	0–3	1–2	0–0	2–4	2–0	2–1	3–0	2–0	2–3	—	2–2	1–2	3–1	1–1
Ostiches-Ath	1–2	1–1	0–1	1–2	1–2	1–0	0–1	1–3	0–0	0–0	0–1	2–1	1–2	1–0	—	3–3	3–1	3–2
Verlaine	0–1	1–3	2–1	0–3	0–2	0–2	0–1	1–1	1–2	8–0	1–2	1–2	3–0	1–3	2–0	—	2–6	1–0
La Louvière Centre	0–1	1–2	0–3	0–0	1–3	0–2	0–1	0–1	1–1	1–4	3–2	0–2	2–4	0–0	4–1	3–1	—	2–1
Eupen U23	2–3	1–3	1–3	1–4	2–3	0–2	0–3	2–3	0–2	1–3	1–1	2–3	3–2	1–1	2–1	3–2	2–2	—

Source: vbal4 (in Dutch)
Legend: Blue = home team win; Yellow = draw; Red = away team win.

== Promotion play-offs ==
=== VV ===
The promotion play-offs are contested by eight teams, from each division four teams: the team finishing second overall plus the three period champions. In case one or more periods are won by the eventual champion (already promoted) or by the same club, then the best ranked team that has not already qualified will take its place. Furthermore, any team not eligible (for instance due to not receiving a licence) will not be eligible to take place and the next best ranked team will take its spot.

Qualified teams:

- Diegem Sport (highest place eligible finisher (3rd) not directly qualified from division VV B)
- Harelbeke (2nd highest place eligible finisher (3rd) not directly qualified from division VV A)
- Jong Essevee (3rd highest place eligible finisher (7th) not directly qualified from division VV A)
- Jong KV Mechelen (2nd highest place eligible finisher (5th) not directly qualified from division VV B)
- Racing Mechelen (3rd highest place eligible finisher (6th) not directly qualified from division VV B)
- Rupel Boom (runner-up division VV B)
- Zelzate (highest place eligible finisher (3rd) not directly qualified from division VV A)

Due to only three teams receiving a licence in division VV A, only seven teams took part. Diegem Sport was the lucky team to receive a bye to the second round. As only one place was available, three rounds will be needed and only the winner of the third round will be automatically promoted. The losing team of round 3 will be first in line in case another spot opens up and a third-place match is scheduled to be played for ruther ranking.

Round 1
4 May 2025
Jong KV Mechelen	0
Zelzate	5
4 May 2025
Racing Mechelen	1
Harelbeke	2
3 May 2025
Jong Essevee	2
Rupel Boom	0

Round 2
11 May 2025
Zelzate	2
Harelbeke	0
11 May 2025
Jong Essevee	2
Diegem	3

Placing 1st/2nd
18 May 2025
Zelzate	1
Diegem	2
Placing 3rd/4th
18 May 2025
Jong Essevee	NP
Harelbeke	NP

==== Round 1 ====
3 May 2025
19:30 CEST

Jong Essevee	2–0	Rupel Boom
Van Keymolen 17'; Talini 82'	Report

4 May 2025
15:00 CEST

Jong KV Mechelen	0–5	Zelzate
	Report	Ackx 3'; Aelterman 13'; Habbas 52'; Youdjouen 63', 84'

4 May 2025
16:00 CEST

Racing Mechelen	1–2	Harelbeke
Bendianishvili 74' (o.g.)	Report	Kyeremeh 17'; Triest 34'

Jong Essevee, Harelbeke, and Zelzate qualified for the VV second-round promotion play-offs, Diegem automatically qualified after receiving a bye in the first round

==== Round 2 ====
10 May 2025
18:30 CEST

Jong Essevee	2–3	Diegem
Van Keymolen 33', 53' (pen.)	Report	Mauën 17'; Sulejmani 61' (pen.), 71'

The Farm, Zulte
Referee: Arthur Seynaeve

11 May 2025
15:00 CEST

Zelzate	2–0	Harelbeke
Habbas 6', 36'	Report

Armand Seghers Complex, Zelzate
Referee: Jonas Timmermans

==== Placing 3rd/4th ====
18 May 2025
15:00 CEST

Jong Essevee	Not Played	Harelbeke

The match between Jong Essevee and Harelbeke was cancelled as it was unlikely that extra promotion spots would become available, making this match useless.

==== Placing 1st/2nd ====
18 May 2025
19:30 CEST

Zelzate	1–2	Diegem
Youdjouen 90'	Report	Deflem 37'; Lokando 45'

Diegem was promoted. Because Jong Genk was ultimately not relegated to the Division 1, KVV Zelzate was also promoted to Division 1.

=== ACFF ===
The promotion play-offs on ACFF-side are contested by four teams: the team finishing second overall plus the three period champions. In case one or more periods are won by the eventual champion (already promoted), the runner-up, or by the same club, then the best ranked team that has not already qualified will take its place. Furthermore, any team not eligible (for instance due to not receiving a licence) will not be eligible to take place and the next best ranked team will take its spot.

Qualified teams:

- Meux (runner-up)
- Onhaye (highest place eligible finisher (3rd) not directly qualified)
- Verviérs (2nd highest place eligible finisher (4th) not directly qualified)
- Habay-la-Neuve (3rd highest place eligible finisher (5th) not directly qualified)

As this season there were no teams from ACFF-side relegation from the 2024–25 Challenger Pro League, two extra teams need to be promoted. As a result, the two first round winners will be promoted. The ACFF has scheduled both a final and 3rd-place match to be played, but it is unlikely that either of these matches will be played as at the time of the draw it was quite unlikely a third team could possibly be promoted.

Round 1
Meux	1 (3)
Onhaye	1 (1)
Verviers	0
Habay-la-Neuve	1

Round 2
Meux	1
Habay-la-Neuve	3
Third place
Onhaye	3
Verviers	2

==== Semi-final ====
11 May 2025
15:00 CEST

Verviers	0–1	Habay-la-Neuve
		Reyter 78'

Stade Communale de Bielmont, Verviers

11 May 2025
18:30 CEST

Meux	1–1	Onhaye
Marion 33' (pen.)		Lorenzon 25'
Penalties
Sleeuwaert (penalty scored); Gaux (penalty scored); Lotte (penalty missed); Gauchet (penalty scored)	3–1	(penalty missed) Gilain; (penalty scored) Leclef; (penalty missed) Defresne; (penalty missed) Puche

Stade des Vert et Blanc, La Bruyère
Attendance: 1,500

Habay-la-Neuve and Meux are promoted. The final and third-place match are scheduled to determine the order in case extra promotion spots become available.

==== Placing 3rd/4th ====
18 May 2025
15:00 CEST

Verviers	3–2	Onhaye
Said 7'; Demarteau 17'; Offermann 65'	Report	Gillis 70'; Houziaux 90+3'

==== Placing 1st/2nd ====
18 May 2025
15:00 CEST

Meux	1–3	Habay-la-Neuve
Kinif 29'	Report	Hausman 14', 36', 38'

== Relegation play-off ==
At this level of the football pyramid, there is only a relegation playoff on the VV-side, with the two teams finishing 14th playing each other.

4 May 2025
15:00

Lille United	1–3	Gullegem
Pelic 71'	Report	Vancraeyveld 1' (pen.); Braekeveld 55'; Moerkerke 90'

Gullegem remain in Belgian Division 2, while Lille United are relegated to Belgian Division 3.
