= Robin Lauwers =

Belgian footballer

Personal information
- Full name: Robin Lauwers
- Date of birth: 18 March 1999 (age 27)
- Place of birth: Turnhout, Belgium
- Height: 1.81 m (5 ft 11 in)
- Position: Midfielder

Team information
- Current team: Houtvenne
- Number: 24

Youth career
- 2007–2009: Willem II
- 2009–2011: Westerlo
- 2011–2019: Willem II

Senior career*
Years	Team	Apps	(Gls)
2018–2019	Willem II	0	(0)
2019–2020	Jong PSV	15	(1)
2021	Fremad Amager	3	(1)
2022–2024	Hoogstraten	57	(6)
2024–	Houtvenne	14	(1)
- * Club domestic league appearances and goals as of 19:01, 9 December 2024 (UTC)

Robin Lauwers (born 18 March 1999) is a Belgian professional footballer who plays as a midfielder for KFC Houtvenne.

== Club career ==
Born in Turnhout, Lauwers began his career with Willem II before joining Eerste Divisie side Jong PSV in 2019. He made his professional debut for the club on 12 August 2019 against Den Bosch. He started in the 2–2 draw. Lauwers scored his first goal for the club on 27 September 2019 against Excelsior. His 63rd minute was not enough as Jong PSV were defeated 2–5.

On 29 October 2021, Lauwers signed with Danish 1st Division club Fremad Amager.

== Career statistics ==
As of match played 6 March 2020

Appearances and goals by club, season and competition
Club	Season	League			Cup		Other		Total	
Club	Season	Division	Apps	Goals	Apps	Goals	Apps	Goals	Apps	Goals
Jong PSV	2019–20	Eerste Divisie	15	1	—		—		15	1
Career total			15	1	0	0	0	0	15	1
