= Zaïd Bafdili =

Belgian footballer (born 2007)

Personal information
- Date of birth: 25 October 2007 (age 19)
- Place of birth: Brussels, Belgium
- Height: 1.70 m (5 ft 7 in)
- Position: Midfielder

Team information
- Current team: Sporting CP B
- Number: 97

Youth career
- –2020: RSC Anderlecht
- 2020–2022: KV Mechelen
- 2022–2024: KRC Genk
- 2024–2025: Sporting CP

Senior career*
Years	Team	Apps	(Gls)
2024–2025	Jong Genk	19	(0)
2025–	Sporting CP B	10	(0)

International career^{‡}
2022	Belgium U15	5	(0)
2022–2023	Belgium U16	12	(3)
2023–2024	Belgium U17	7	(1)
2024–	Belgium U18	5	(0)
2025–	Belgium U19	7	(0)
- * Club domestic league appearances and goals as of 20 June 2026 ‡ National team caps and goals as of 00:52, 2 December 2025 (UTC)

Zaïd Bafdili (born 25 October 2007) is a Belgian professional footballer who plays as a midfielder for Liga Portugal 2 club Sporting CP B.

== Early life ==
Bafdili was born on 25 October 2007 in Brussels, Belgium. Of Moroccan descent through his parents, he is the cousin of Belgian footballer Bilal Bafdili and the brother of Belgian footballer Dalil Bafdili.

== Club career ==
As a youth player, Bafdili joined the youth academy of RSC Anderlecht. In 2020, he joined the youth academy of KV Mechelen. Two years later, he joined the youth academy of KRC Genk and was promoted to the club's reserve team in 2024. On 10 November 2023, he debuted for them during a 1–3 away loss to SL16 in the league.

On 2 August 2025, Bafdili moved to Portugal, joining Sporting CP.

== Style of play ==
Bafdili plays as a midfielder and is right-footed. German news website Transfermarkt wrote in 2025 that he "possesses wonderful game intelligence...is composed under pressure, has an accomplished passing range and smart decision-making" and he has received comparisons to Italy international Marco Verratti.
