= Victor Daguin =

French footballer (born 2000)

Personal information
- Full name: Victor Joseph Gérard Daguin
- Date of birth: 8 March 2000 (age 26)
- Place of birth: Nantes, France
- Height: 1.85 m (6 ft 1 in)
- Positions: Defensive midfielder; centre-back

Team information
- Current team: Sepsi OSK
- Number: 28

Youth career
- 2006–2008: La Montagne
- 2008–2011: FC Bouaye
- 2011–2019: Nantes

Senior career*
Years	Team	Apps	(Gls)
2019–2022	Nantes B	44	(2)
2022–2024	Avranches	52	(0)
2024–2026	Lierse	57	(3)
2026–	Sepsi OSK	10	(0)

International career
2016	France U16	6	(0)
- * Club domestic league appearances and goals as of 1 November 2026

Victor Joseph Gérard Daguin (born 8 March 2000) is a French professional footballer who plays as a defensive midfielder or a centre-back for Liga I club Sepsi OSK.

== Career ==
A youth product of Nantes, Daguin began his senior career with the reserves squad of Nantes in the Championnat National in 2019. In the summer of 2022, he moved to Ligue 3 side Avranches, where he spent 2 seasons. He was transferred to Lierse in the summer of 2024.
