= Robby Ndefe =

Dutch footballer

Personal information
- Date of birth: 1 September 1996 (age 30)
- Place of birth: Weert, Netherlands
- Height: 1.74 m (5 ft 9 in)
- Position: Winger

Team information
- Current team: Eendracht Aalst
- Number: 70

Youth career
- Asse-Zellik
- SK Lebeke-Aalst
- –2015: Eendracht Aalst
- 2015–2016: Brabant United

Senior career*
Years	Team	Apps	(Gls)
2016–2018	RKC Waalwijk	20	(0)
2019–2021	Ninove	4	(1)
2021–2024	Olsa Brakel	86	(17)
2024–2025	Harelbeke	27	(5)
2025–	Eendracht Aalst	0	(0)
- * Club domestic league appearances and goals as of 26 January 2026

Robby Ndefe (born 1 September 1996) is a Dutch-Angolan footballer who plays as a winger for Eendracht Aalst.

== Club career ==
He made his professional debut in the Eerste Divisie for RKC Waalwijk on 30 October 2016 in a game against Fortuna Sittard.

On 26 August 2019, Ninove announced, that they had signed Ndefe.

On 1 July 2021, Ndefe signed with Belgian Division 2 club Olsa Brakel.
