= Bilal Bafdili =

Belgian footballer (born 2002)

Personal information
- Date of birth: 3 August 2004 (age 22)
- Place of birth: Charleroi, Belgium
- Height: 1.80 m (5 ft 11 in)
- Position: Attacking midfielder

Team information
- Current team: Mechelen
- Number: 11

Youth career
- AFC Tubize
- 2018–2019: Waasland-Beveren
- 2019–2020: Standard Liège
- 2020–2022: Mechelen

Senior career*
Years	Team	Apps	(Gls)
2022–2024	Jong KVM	28	(15)
2023–	Mechelen	72	(6)
- * Club domestic league appearances and goals as of 31 May 2026

Bilal Bafdili (born 3 August 2004) is a Belgian professional football player who plays as an attacking midfielder for Belgian Pro League club Mechelen.

== Career ==
Bafdili began playing futsal as a youth, before going through the academies of AFC Tubize, Waasland-Beveren, and Standard Liège before moving to Mechelen in 2020 to finish his development. He was promoted to their reserves in 2022. On 24 January 2023, he signed his first professional contract with Mechelen until 2025. On 28 January 2023, he debuted with the senior Mechelen side in a Belgian Pro League loss to Westerlo. On 13 June 2024 his contract was extended until 2027.

== Personal life ==
Born in Belgium, Bafdili is of Moroccan descent. He is the cousin of the footballers Dalil and Zaïd Bafdili.
