= KFC Houtvenne =

Belgian football club

Houtvenne
- Full name: Koninklijke Voetbalclub Houtvenne
- Nickname: Josterwaak
- Founded: 1946; 80 years ago
- Ground: Stadion KFC Houtvenne A Terrein, Houtvenne
- Capacity: 1,500
- Chairman: Bart Van den Brande
- Manager: Geert van Dessel
- League: Belgian Division 1
- 2025–26: Belgian Division 1 VV, 14th of 16
Home colours	Away colours

Koninklijke Voetbalclub Houtvenne is a football club based in Houtvenne, Antwerp Province, Belgium. The team set to play in Belgian Division 1 from 2025–26, the third tier of Belgian football after promotion from Belgian Division 2 in 2024–25. The club is affiliated to the Royal Belgian Football Association (KBVB) with matricule 4481 and has green and red as club colours. The grounds of the club are located near the village centre of Houtvenne, but on the territory of the neighbouring municipality of Herselt.

== History ==
Houtvenne played for a number of years with the Flemish Football Association, and then joined the Royal Belgian Football Association (KBVB) around 1946, where they were given matricule number 4481. Houtvenne began competing in the Belgian Provincial Leagues.

In the 2015–16 season, the club played in the First Provincial and won the title. For the first time in club existence, the club promoted to the national tiers, as they would play in the Belgian Third Amateur Division from the 2016–17 season.

After four seasons in the fifth tier, a new high point in club history occurred. Despite finishing fourth in their division and narrowly missing promotion, ASV Geel failed to obtain their licence for the fourth tier, which meant that Houtvenne reached the Belgian Division 2, and would play their first season at that level for 2020–21.

== Honours ==
Houtvenne honours
Honour	No.	Years
Belgian Division 2 VV B	1	2024–25
Eerste Provinciale Antwerpen	1	2015–16
Tweede Provinciale Antwerpen	1	2005–06
