= Joran Triest =

Belgian footballer

Personal information
- Date of birth: 8 April 1997 (age 29)
- Place of birth: Aalst, Belgium
- Height: 1.94 m (6 ft 4 in)
- Position: Forward

Team information
- Current team: Eendracht Aalst
- Number: 9

Youth career
- Jong Lede
- Club Brugge
- Lokeren

Senior career*
Years	Team	Apps	(Gls)
2016–2018	Lokeren	1	(0)
2018–2020	Hamme	48	(16)
2020–2024	KRC Gent	71	(49)
2024–2025	Harelbeke	31	(19)
2025–	Eendracht Aalst	0	(0)
- * Club domestic league appearances and goals as of 26 January 2026

Joran Triest (born 8 April 1997) is a Belgian footballer who plays as a forward for Eendracht Aalst.

== Club career ==
Joran Triest started his career with Lokeren.
