= Crossing Schaerbeek =

Association football club in Saint-Georges-sur-Meuse, Belgium

- Full name: Crossing Schaerbeek
- Founded: 1945; 81 years ago 2012; 14 years ago (merger with Evere)
- Ground: Crossing Stadium, Schaerbeek
- Manager: Dave De Herdt
- League: Belgian Division 1
- 2024–25: Division 2 ACFF, 1st of 18 (promoted)
- Website: crossing-schaerbeek.be
Home colours	Away colours	Third colours

Crossing Schaerbeek is a Belgian football club based in Schaerbeek, Brussels. The club plays in the Belgian Division 1, after promotion from the Belgian Division 2 in 2024–25. The club colours are green and white.

== History ==
The club joined the Belgian FA midway through the 1940s as Union Sportive Albert Schaerbeek and received matricule number 4070 upon registration and was placed in the provincial leagues. The club played at the Chazal stadium in Schaerbeek.

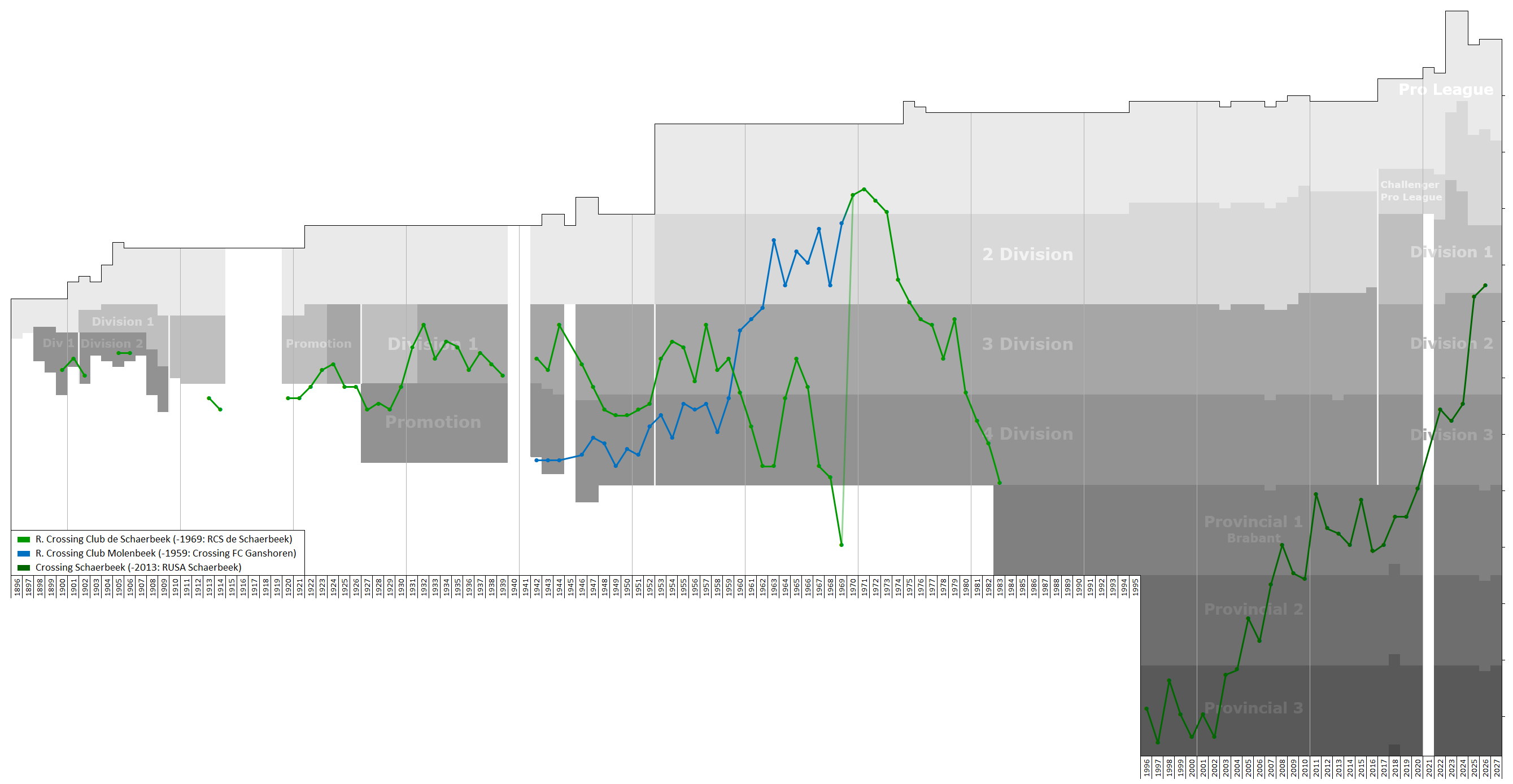
Historical chart of Crossing Schaerbeek league performance

During the first decade of the 21st century, the club was able to promote several levels to reach the highest provincial level, where it was joined in 2011 by R.F.C. Evere with which the club merged in 2012 to form Crossing Schaerbeek Evere and continued with the matricule number 4070, with the matricule of Evere (410) voided. The name of the new club is a reference to a former club from the neighbourhood: Royal Crossing Club de Schaerbeek, which used to play at the highest level of Belgian football but after several relegations had relocated to Elewijt during the 1980s. The newly formed club started to play at the Crossing Stadium close to the Josaphat Park in Schaerbeek. Just one season later in 2013, the club name was shortened to Crossing Schaerbeek.

In recent years the club has had several successes: in 2020 it became provincial champions in a season that was ended prematurely due to the Covid pandemic, thereby entering the national level. A league reform was introduced that year however, which involved inserting a new division at the third level and pushing all divisions one level down. This meant that while the club now played at the national level, it was still playing at level five in the Belgian football pyramid. At this lowest national level, the club then spent four seasons before achieving back-to-back promotions in 2024 (via play-offs) and 2025 (champions) to end up at level three, the highest non-professional level in Belgium.

== Honours ==
- Belgian Division 2
  - Winner (1): 2024–25
