= Belgian Division 1 =

Belgian third-division

- Founded: 2016; 10 years ago
- Country: Belgium
- Confederation: UEFA
- Number of clubs: 28 (2 leagues: 16+12)
- Level on pyramid: 3
- Promotion to: Challenger Pro League
- Relegation to: Belgian Division 2
- Domestic cup: Belgian Cup
- Current champions: FFA: Royal Excelsior Virton; VV: Sporting Hasselt (2025–26)
- Current: 2026–27 Belgian Division 1

The Belgian Division 1 is a semi-professional division and the third-highest division in the Belgian football league system, one level below the Challenger Pro League. It was created by the Royal Belgian Football Association in 2016, coming in at the third level and pushing all divisions one level down. Initially it was known as the Belgian First Amateur Division, but due to the negative connotation of the word amateur the league was renamed to Belgian National Division 1 from the 2019–20 season onwards. Then, from the 2024–25 season, a split was made into two separate divisions, with the teams holding a Flemish license and those playing with a Francophone license now playing in separate divisions within the league. The Flemish division consists of 16 teams and is referred to as the Division 1 VV, the Walloon division only contains 12 teams and is called Division 1 FFA.

== History ==
The Belgian First Amateur Division was created in 2016 following an overhaul of the Belgian football league system which saw the number of professional clubs reduced to 24. As a result, from the third level and below only amateur clubs remain. The two remaining levels above the Belgian Provincial leagues were reformed into three amateur levels, namely the Belgian First Amateur Division, the Belgian Second Amateur Division and the Belgian Third Amateur Division. As a result, the Belgian Provincial Leagues dropped to the sixth level of the league system.

In 2020, the levels were renamed to Belgian National Division 1, Belgian Division 2 and Belgian Division 3 respectively.

In 2022–23, the league was temporarily expanded to 20 teams but reduced again to 18 teams from 2023–24.

From the 2024–25 season, the league was expanded to 28 teams but split into two separate divisions of 16 (Flemish) and 12 (Francophone) teams.

In April 2026, ACFF will be rename to FFA (Football Francophone Amateur).

== Competition format ==
Originally, the season consisted of a regular round-robin tournament followed by promotion play-offs for the top four teams, with normally only one team gaining promotion to the Challenger Pro League. Regarding relegation, the bottom three teams were automatically demoted, while the team finishing one place above required to take part in the relegation playoffs together with three teams from the Belgian Division 2, with only the playoff winner obtaining a spot in the following season's Belgian National Division 1.

Following the split into two divisions from the 2024–25 season, the Flemish VV division will play a round-robin tournament of 38 matches without play-offs, while the Francophone ACFF division will play 22 round-robin matches after which the league will split into two halves, with the top six clubs battling for promotion and the bottom six clubs playing to avoid relegation.

== Past results overview ==
Season	Division	Regular season winner	Promotion playoff participants	Champions	Promoted	Relegated
2016–17	only one division	Beerschot Wilrijk	Beerschot Wilrijk, Dessel Sport, Heist and Virton	Beerschot Wilrijk	Beerschot Wilrijk	Coxyde, Hasselt, Sprimont-Comblain and WS Bruxelles
2017–18	only one division	Lommel	Deinze, Dessel Sport, Knokke and Lommel	Knokke	Lommel (Note: Champions Knokke did not apply for a professional football license, allowing runners-up Lommel to be promoted instead.)	Berchem, Hamme and Patro Eisden Maasmechelen
2018–19	only one division	Tessenderlo	Deinze, Lierse Kempenzonen, Tessenderlo and Virton	Virton	Virton	Aalst, ASV Geel, Knokke and Oudenaarde
2019–20	only one division	Deinze	not held due to coronavirus pandemic	Deinze	Deinze, RWDM47 and Seraing (Note: Because both Roeselare and Virton from the 2019–20 Belgian First Division B were refused a professional football license and the bankruptcy of Lokeren, two additional teams were promoted besides champions Deinze. Similarly, two teams were spared of relegation (Sint-Eloois-Winkel Sport and La Louvière Centre) resulting in only Tubize being relegated.)	Tubize
2020–21	only one division	season cancelled due to the COVID-19 pandemic in Belgium.				
2021–22	only one division	RFC Liège	Dender EH, Dessel Sport, Knokke and RFC Liège	Dender EH	Dender EH	La Louvière Centre (Note: Because Excel Mouscron from the 2021–22 Belgian First Division B was refused a professional football license, and the fact that Roeselare folded just before the start of the season, only one team was relegated.)
2022–23	only one division	Patro Eisden Maasmechelen	no playoffs this season	Patro Eisden Maasmechelen	Francs Borains, Patro Eisden Maasmechelen and RFC Liège	Mandel United, Ninove, Rupel Boom
2023–24	only one division	RAAL La Louvière	no playoffs this season	RAAL La Louvière	RAAL La Louvière and Lokeren-Temse	Sint-Eloois-Winkel and Visé (Note: Sint-Eloois-Winkel had announced to be folding as a team at the end of the season and was hence relegated. Visé was refused a professional football license and forced to drop down.)
Season	Division	Regular season winner	Promotion playoff participants	Champions	Promoted	Relegated
2024–25	ACFF	Olympic Charleroi	Mons, Olympic Charleroi, Rochefort, Stockay, Tubize-Braine and Virton	Olympic Charleroi		Binche (Note: Binche was refused a license to play in the Belgian Division 1 for the 2025–26 season and is hence considered to be finishing last and will occupy one of the relegation spots. The club has announced it will not appeal the decision.) and Tournai
2024–25	VV	Jong KAA Gent	no playoffs	Jong KAA Gent		Cappellen, Heist, Young Reds Antwerp
2025–26	ACFF (FFA from April 2026)	Tubize-Braine	Habay, Meux, Mons, Rochefort, Tubize-Braine and Virton	Virton		Stockay, Crossing Schaerbeek, Union Namur
2025–26	VV	Hasselt	no playoffs	Hasselt		Diegem, Ninove
2026–27	FFA					
2026–27	VV					
