= Diegem Sport =

Belgian football club

- Full name: Koninklijke Diegem Sport
- Founded: 1943; 83 years ago
- Ground: Gemeentelijk Sportstadion
- Capacity: 4,000
- Chairman: (Belgium) Bert Van Weyenberge
- Manager: (Belgium) Cédric Demeulenaere
- League: Belgian Division 1
- 2024–25: Division 2 VV B, 3rd of 16 (promoted via play-offs)
- Website: http://www.kdiegemsport.be/
Home colours

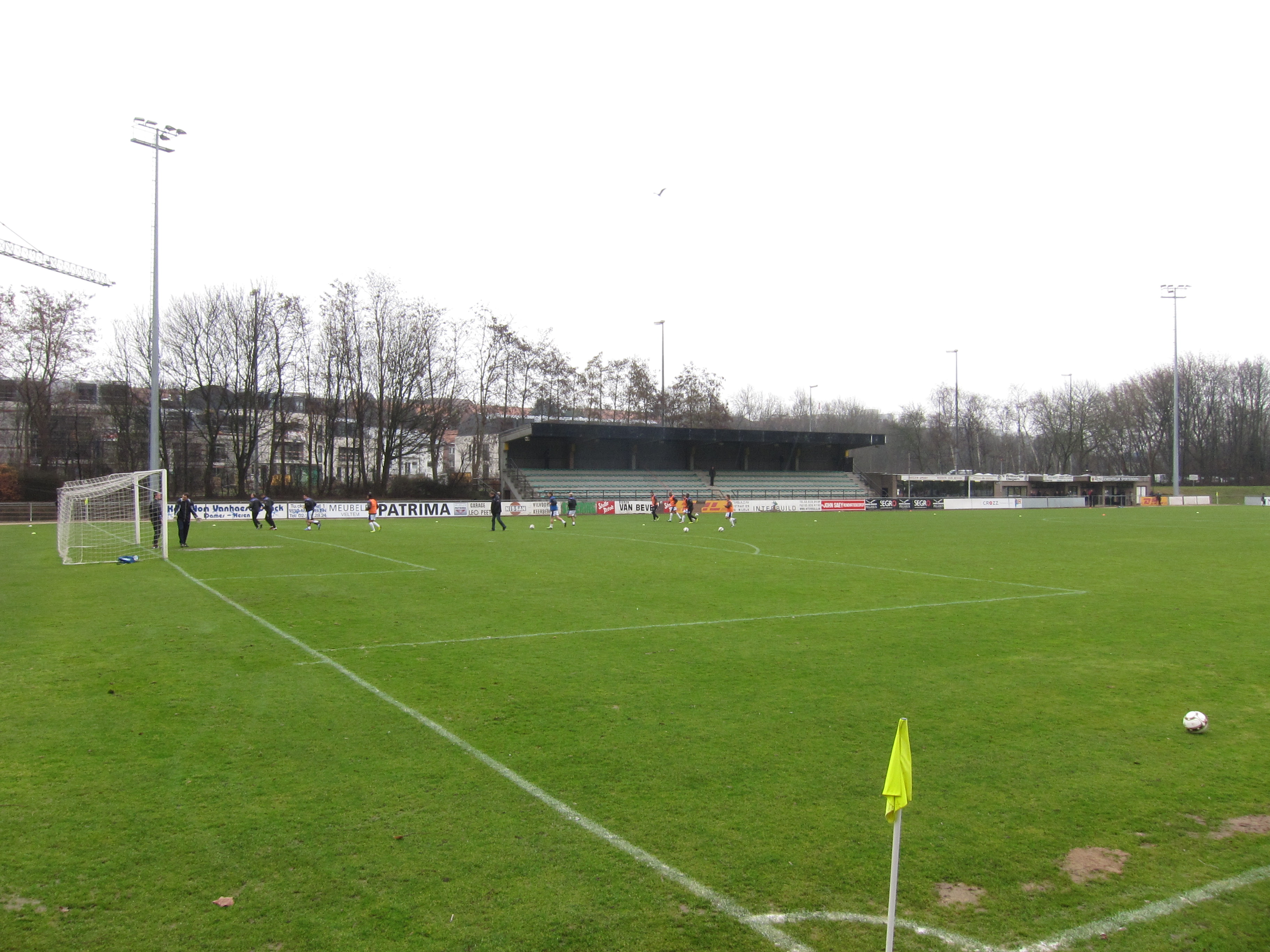
Ground of Diegem Sport

Koninklijke Diegem Sport is a Belgian association football club based in Diegem, Flemish Brabant. The team set to playing in the Belgian Division 1 from 2025–26, the third tier of Belgian football after promotion from Belgian Division 2 in 2024–25. The club was founded in 1943 when two clubs from Diegem merged, namely Diegem-Star and Diegem-Lo. They play at the Gemeentelijk Sportstadion in Diegem.

== History ==
Founded in 1943, the club managed to reach the Belgian Promotion in 1976 with coach Etienne Borre, after many years in the lower Belgian Provincial leagues. Until the end of the century, Diegem played at the fourth level, with only two seasons back in the first division of Brabant provincial league. In 1993 the club, after 50 years of existence, received the royal prefix Koninklijke and added it to its name. At the end of season 2002–03, Diegem finally reached the third division, where they still play.
