= RFC Meux =

Association football club in Belgium

Meux
- Full name: Royal Football Club Meux
- Founded: 1946; 80 years ago
- Ground: Stade des Vert et Blanc, La Bruyère
- Capacity: 1,500
- Chairman: Philippe Dubail
- Manager: Laurent Gomez
- League: Belgian Division 1
- 2024–25: Belgian Division 2 ACFF, 2nd of 18 (promoted via play-offs)
Home colours

Royal Football Club Meux is a football club based in La Bruyère, Wallonia, Belgium. The club set to compete in the Belgian Division 1 from 2025 to 2026, the third tier of Belgian football after promotion from Belgian Division 2 in 2024–25. The club is affiliated to the Royal Belgian Football Association (KBVB) with matricule 4454 and has green as its club colour.

== History ==
Football Club Meux was founded shortly after the end of World War II and became affiliated with the Royal Belgian Football Association (KBVB). They were registered with matricule 4454 and began playing at the lowest regional level. The club's first honour was a victory in the Coupe de la Province de Namur in 1966. The club played in the provincial divisions for half a century. In 1997, Meux won the title in the First Provincial Division and were promoted for the first time in their history to the Belgian Fourth Division, the fourth and lowest national level.

In their first season in national football, the club which had since become Royal Football Club Meux, finished in eighth place. The next season, the club ranked second to last, a position synonymous with relegation to the provincial divisions. The following years were spent as a yo-yo club between the highest regional tier and the lowest national tier.

In the 2010s, the club's results improved and after failing to win promotion two consecutive seasons in fifth place, the team clinched the title in the Fourth Division in 2016, the first title at national level in the club's history. Thanks to this, the club could maintain themselves at the new fourth national level, which took the name of Belgian Second Amateur Division from the 2016–17 season.

In 2024–25, Meux secure promotion to Belgian Division 1 from next season after finishing second place ACFF due to promotion play-off.

== Seasons ==
- Seasons spent at Level 1 of the football league system: 0
- Seasons spent at Level 2 of the football league system: 0
- Seasons spent at Level 3 of the football league system: 0
- Seasons spent at Level 4 of the football league system: 19
- Seasons spent at Level 5 of the football league system: 0
