= Hazerswoude =

Coordinates: 52°06′N 4°35′E

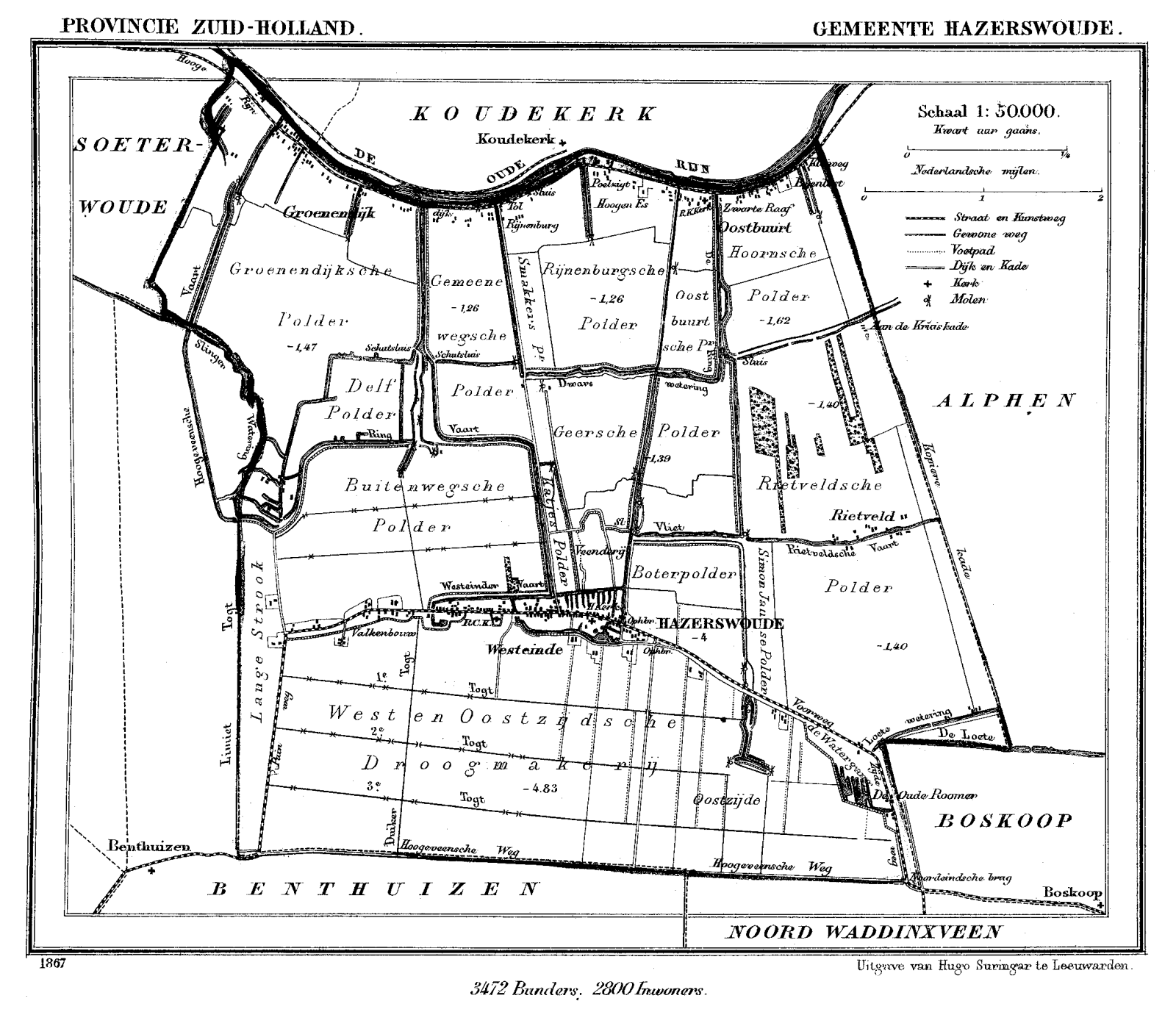
Illustrated map of Hazerswoude

Hazerswoude is a former municipality in the Dutch province of South Holland. It contained the towns of Hazerswoude-Dorp and Hazerswoude-Rijndijk, and the villages of Groenendijk and Bent.

Hazerswoude was a separate municipality until 1991, when it became part of Rijneveld.

Rijneveld, in 1993 changed in Rijnwoude, has been a part of Alphen aan den Rijn since 2014.
