= Rijnwoude =

- Former municipality
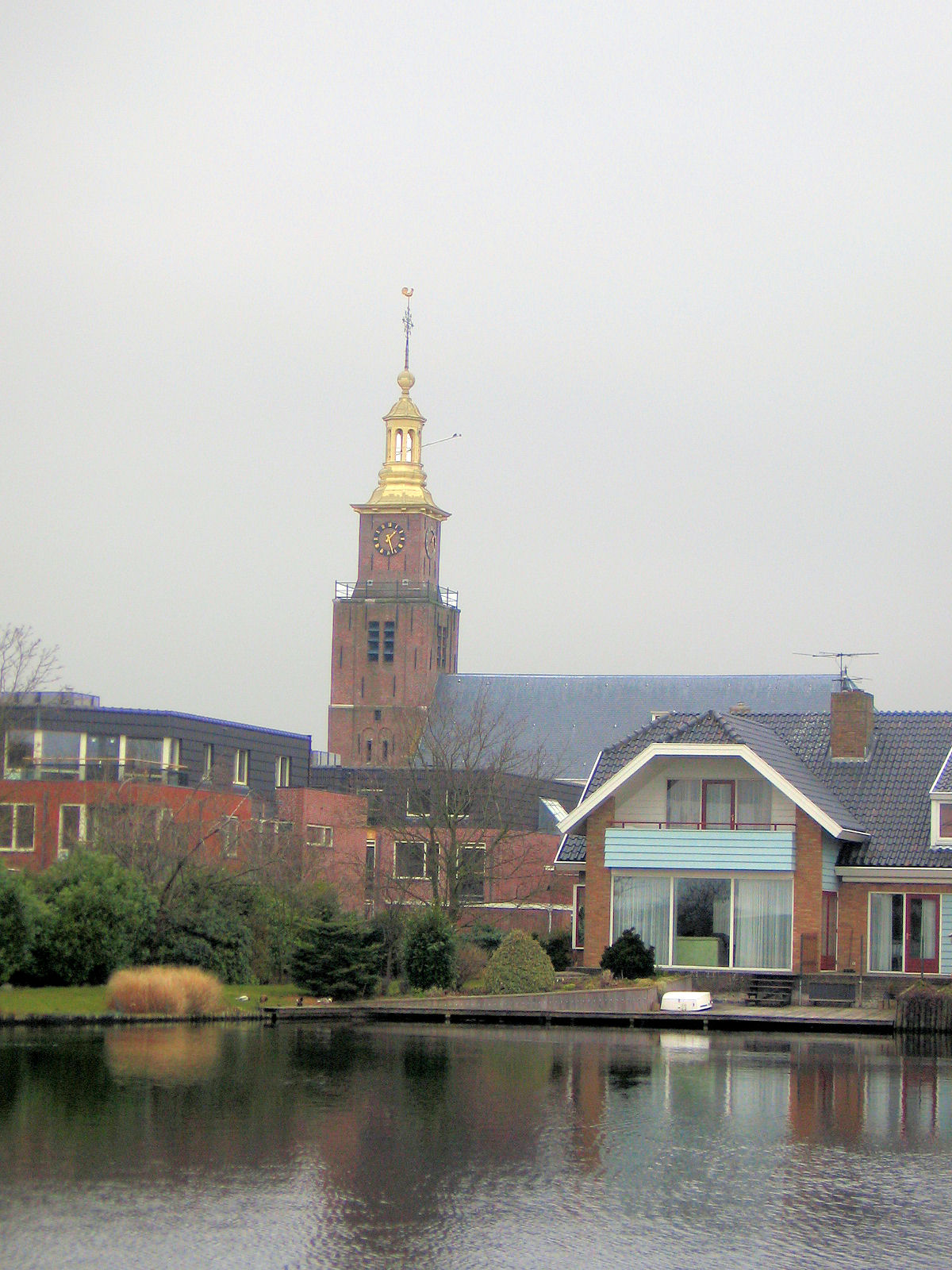
- Church in Hazerswoude-Dorp

- Flag Coat of arms

- Location in South Holland
- Coordinates: 52°8′N 4°35′E
- Country: Netherlands
- Province: South Holland
- Municipality: Alphen aan den Rijn
- Established: 1 January 1991
- Dissolved: 1 January 2014

Area
  - Total: 57.89 km^{2} (22.35 sq mi)
  - Land: 56.69 km^{2} (21.89 sq mi)
  - Water: 1.20 km^{2} (0.46 sq mi)
- Elevation: −1 m (−3.3 ft)

Population (November 2013)
  - Total: 18,523
  - Density: 327/km^{2} (850/sq mi)
- Time zone: UTC+1 (CET)
  - Summer (DST): UTC+2 (CEST)
- Postcode: 2390–2396, 2730–2731
- Area code: 0172, 071, 079

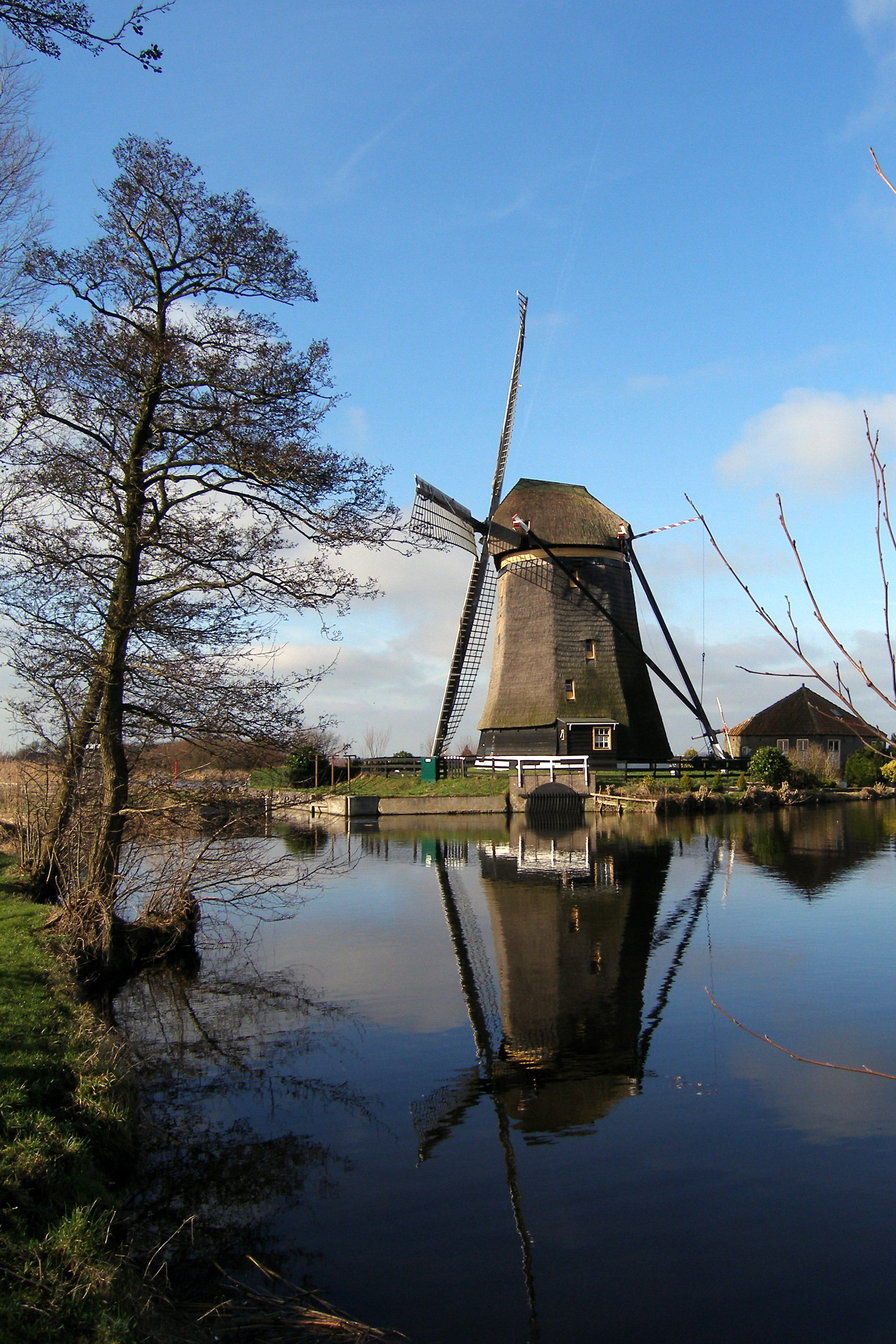
Windmill Rietveldse Molen, near Hazerswoude-Dorp

Rijnwoude (Dutch pronunciation: [ˈrɛiɱˌʋʌudə]) was a municipality in the western Netherlands, in the province of South Holland. The municipality covered an area of 57.89 km^{2} (22.35 sq mi) of which 1.20 km^{2} (0.46 sq mi) was water.

Rijnwoude was formed in 1991 as Rijneveld through the merger of the former municipalities of Benthuizen, Hazerswoude and Koudekerk aan den Rijn. In 1993 the municipality was renamed to Rijnwoude. In 2014 the municipality was dissolved and its land area was amalgamated into Alphen aan den Rijn.

The municipality of Rijnwoude consisted of the communities Benthorn, Benthuizen, Hazerswoude-Dorp, Groenendijk, Hazerswoude-Rijndijk (location of town hall), Hogeveen, and Koudekerk aan den Rijn.
