= Benthorn =

- Hamlet
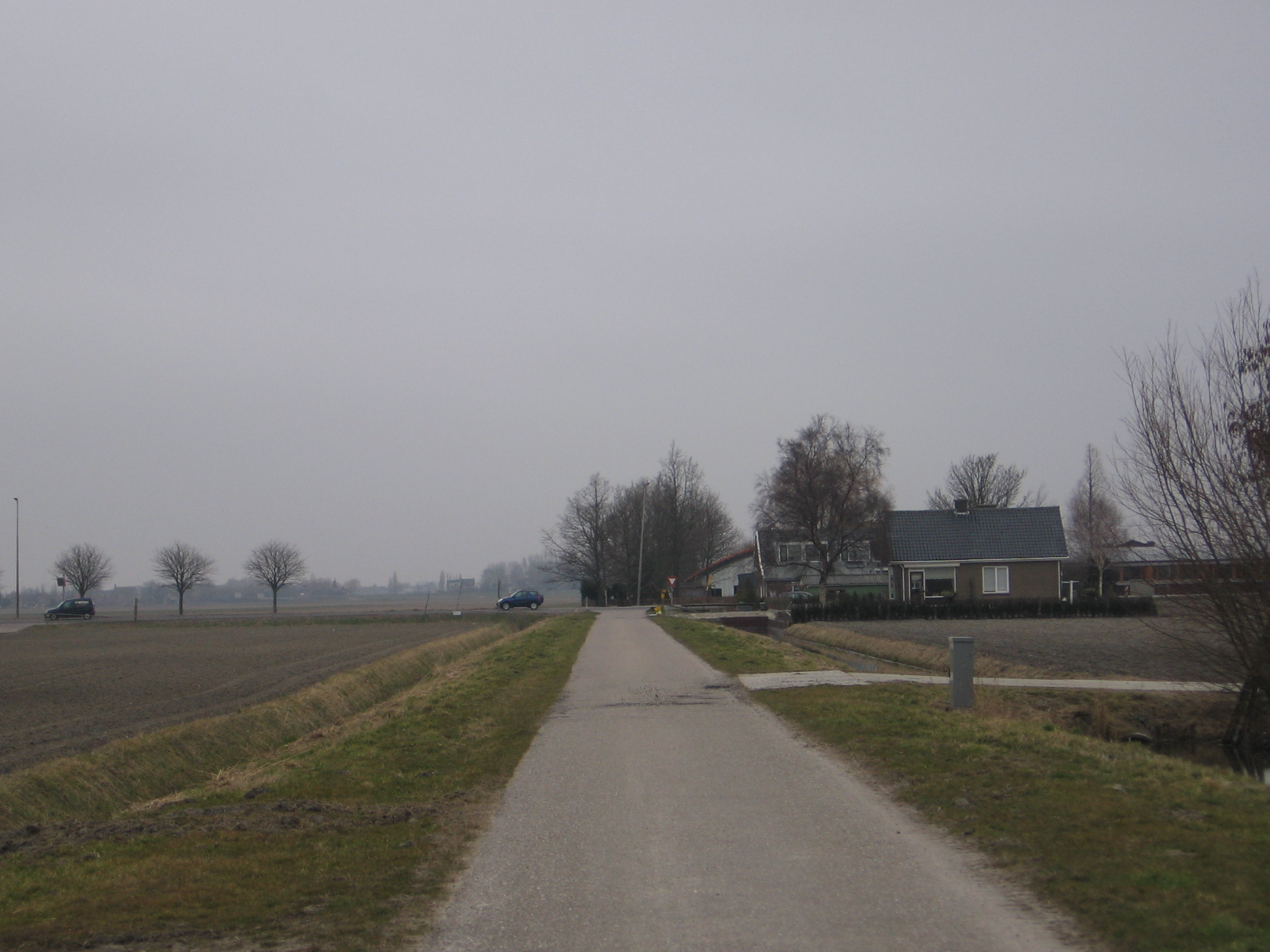
- Interactive map of Benthorn
- Coordinates: 52°4′34″N 4°33′45″E
- Country: Netherlands
- Province: South Holland
- Municipality: Alphen aan den Rijn

Benthorn is a hamlet in the Dutch province of South Holland. It is located in the municipality of Alphen aan den Rijn, about 2 km east of the centre of Benthuizen.

Benthorn used to be a heerlijkheid (manor), owned by the States of Holland and West Friesland. It was sold to Adam Adriaan van der Duyn, lord of 's Gravemoer, in 1724. In 1812, Benthorn became a part of the municipality of Hazerswoude, but on 1 April 1817 it became a separate municipality again.

According to the 19th-century historian A.J. van der Aa, in 1840 Benthorn consisted of 0.85 square km and had 10 inhabitants in 2 houses. Because of the small size of the municipality, it was merged into Benthuizen in 1847.

Part of the hamlet had to be demolished for the construction of the high speed railway HSL-Zuid, and only three farms remain. The name of the hamlet no longer appears on recent topographical maps of the area.

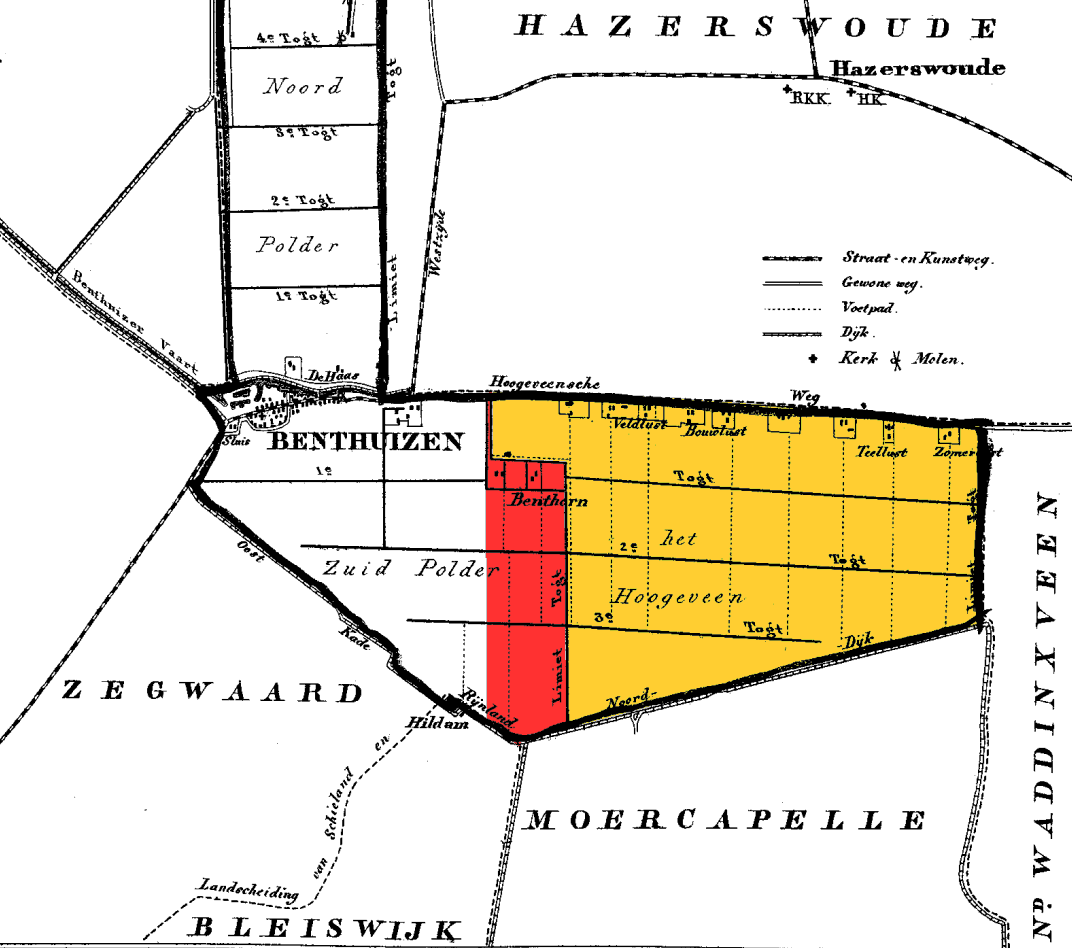
The former municipality of Benthorn (1817-1847), in red, on an 1868 map of the municipality of Benthuizen.
