= Alphen, South Holland =

Former municipality in the Netherlands

Coordinates: 52.1283°N 4.6536°E

Alphen was a municipality in the Dutch province of South Holland. It consisted of the village of Alphen; now called Alphen aan den Rijn. That village was much smaller than the current town; the municipality only contained the part south of the Oude Rijn.

The municipality existed until 1918, when it merged with Aarlanderveen and Oudshoorn.
