= Lykele Faber =

Lykele Faber, also given as Lijkele Faber (Koudekerk aan den Rijn, 14 September 1919 - Vernon, British Columbia, 3 October 2009) was a Dutch commando and radio operator during World War II. He took part in the Battle of Arnhem and helped organize the Dutch resistance. In recognition of his services, Faber was decorated with the Dutch Bronze Cross (1945) and Cross of Merit (1945) and the British King's Medal for Courage in the Cause of Freedom (1947), among others.

== Military career ==
=== First mission ===
Faber was working for the Dutch postal service PTT in 1943 when he came into contact with the Dutch resistance movement through relatives of his fiancée. He joined the resistance and was tasked with carrying a map to London showing the German defenses along the Scheldt estuary. Faber successfully managed to find his way to London by way of Paris and Spain.

=== Battle of Arnhem ===
After Faber had been checked and approved by the Dutch and British secret service, he joined a group of Dutchmen being trained for Operation Jedburgh, which involved secret agents being parachuted behind enemy lines to conduct sabotage and guerrilla actions and organize local resistance groups. Faber received training in the Scottish Highlands as a communications specialist, and was also trained in parachute jumping, first from balloons and then from planes. He completed his training with the rank of sergeant.

Shortly after, on 17 September 1944, Faber landed near Son as the radio operator of Jedburgh team Daniel II. He used the assumed name of Lodewijck Fokker for this mission. Faber was in charge of maintaining the radio communications of the American 101st Airborne Division during the Battle of Arnhem. However, the radio equipment was lost during the landing. Following the Allied defeat at Arnhem, Faber returned to London by way of Brussels.

=== Mission in Friesland ===
In November 1944, Lykele Faber and Peter Tazelaar were dropped by parachute near Haskerhorne in the Dutch province of Friesland as an agent for the Dutch intelligence agency Bureau Bijzondere Opdrachten (BBO). Their mission, codenamed Necking, was to maintain radio contact with London, organize the Frisian resistance and help set up drop locations to supply the resistance fighters with arms and ammunition. Faber and Tazelaar installed themselves with radio equipment on board a yacht hidden in the reed along the edges of the Lytse Wiid and Nannewiid lakes.

In March 1945, Faber and Tazelaar were discovered by German troops, and their boat was sunk. However, they managed to escape arrest. Faber and Tazelaar remained in Friesland until the end of the war, joined for some time by stranded British radio operator Alfred C. Springate. On 21 April, they were liberated by Canadian troops.

Faber and Tazelaar's boat is now on display at the Fries Verzetsmuseum (Frisian Resistance Museum) in Leeuwarden.

=== Post-World War II ===
After the end of the war, Faber was temporarily awarded the rank of reserve first lieutenant for general service.

Faber emigrated to Canada and settled in Vernon, British Columbia, where he died in 2009 at the age of 90.
