= Bent, Netherlands =

Bent
- Hamlet
- Interactive map of Bent
- Coordinates: 52°6′16″N 4°33′22″E
- Country: Netherlands
- Province: South Holland
- Municipality: Alphen aan den Rijn

Bent is a hamlet in the Dutch province of South Holland. It is located in the municipality of Alphen aan den Rijn, about 2 km northwest of the village Hazerswoude-Dorp.

The hamlet is surrounded by three nurseries.
