= Koudekerk aan den Rijn =

- Village
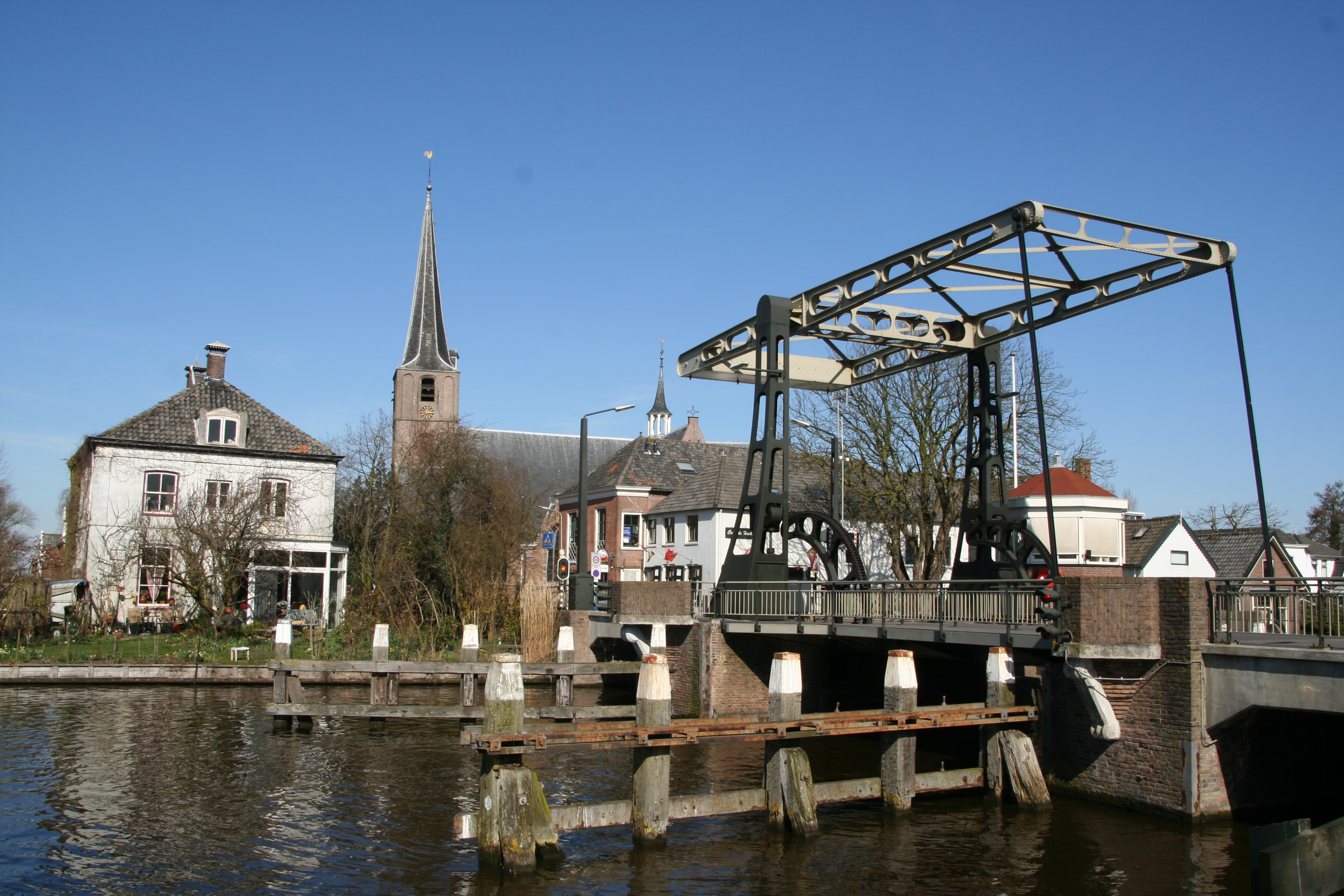

- Flag Coat of arms

- Location in the province of South Holland in the Netherlands Location in the Netherlands
- Coordinates: 52°8′5″N 4°36′7″E
- Country: Netherlands
- Province: South Holland
- Municipality: Alphen aan den Rijn

Area
  - Total: 10.31 km^{2} (3.98 sq mi)
- Elevation: 0.1 m (0.33 ft)

Population (2021)
  - Total: 4,105
  - Density: 398.2/km^{2} (1,031/sq mi)
- Time zone: UTC+1 (CET)
  - Summer (DST): UTC+2 (CEST)
- Postal code: 2396
- Dialing code: 071

Koudekerk aan den Rijn (English: Cold Church upon Rhine) is a village located in the municipality of Alphen aan den Rijn, Netherlands. It is located about 4 km west of the urban centre, in the province of South Holland.

== History ==
Koudekerk aan den Rijn is a dike village which developed in the Early Middle Ages along the Luttike Rijn and the Oude Rijn.

The Dutch Reformed church is a three aisled basilica-like church. The tower was built around 1400, but probably contains 13th century elements. The 15th century was dedicated to Aleid van Poelgeest who was killed in 1392. The church and tower were extensively restored between 1935 and 1936.

Groot-Poelgeest Castle was first mentioned in 1326, but probably dated from around 1250. The castle started to deteriorate after 1705 and it turned into a ruin. The tower, the castle island and a carriage house remain.

Koudekerk aan den Rijn was a separate municipality until 1991, when it became part of Rijnwoude. Until 1938, the municipality was known as Koudekerk. Since 2014 Koudekerk is part of the city Alphen aan den Rijn

== Notable people ==
- Armin van Buuren, DJ, born in Leiden and grew up in Koudekerk aan den Rijn.

== Gallery ==
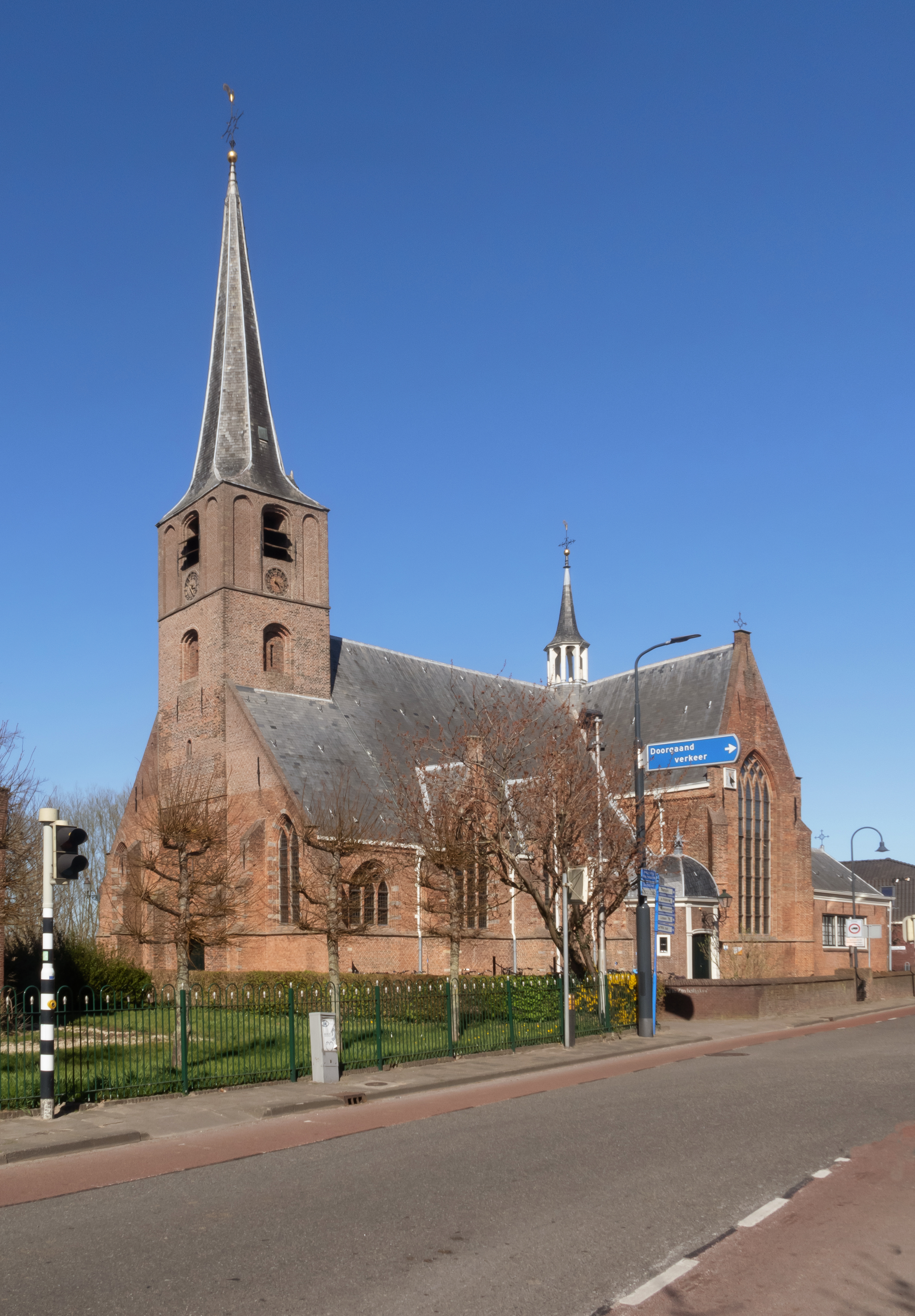
Dutch Reformed church

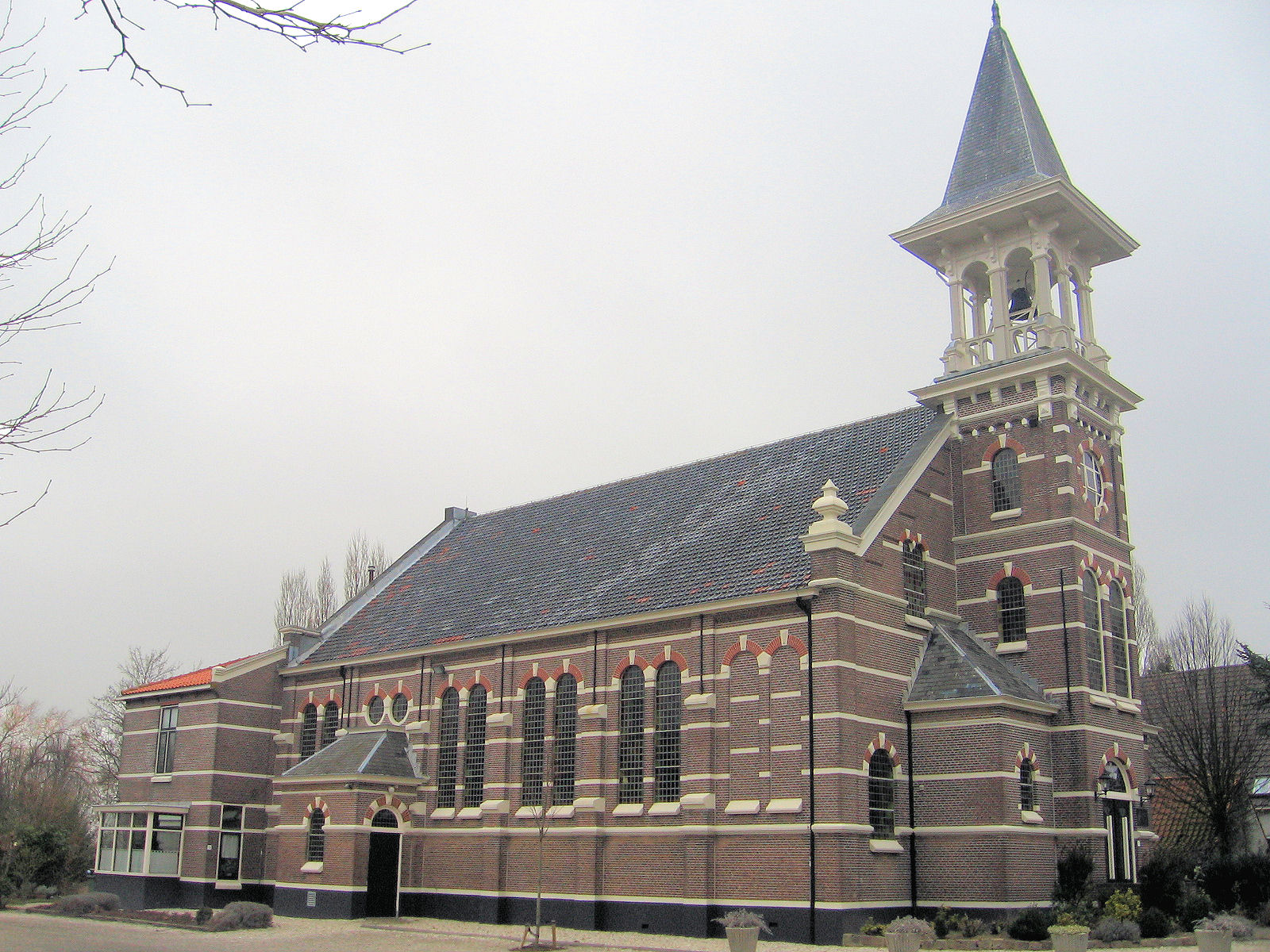
Reformed church, 19th century

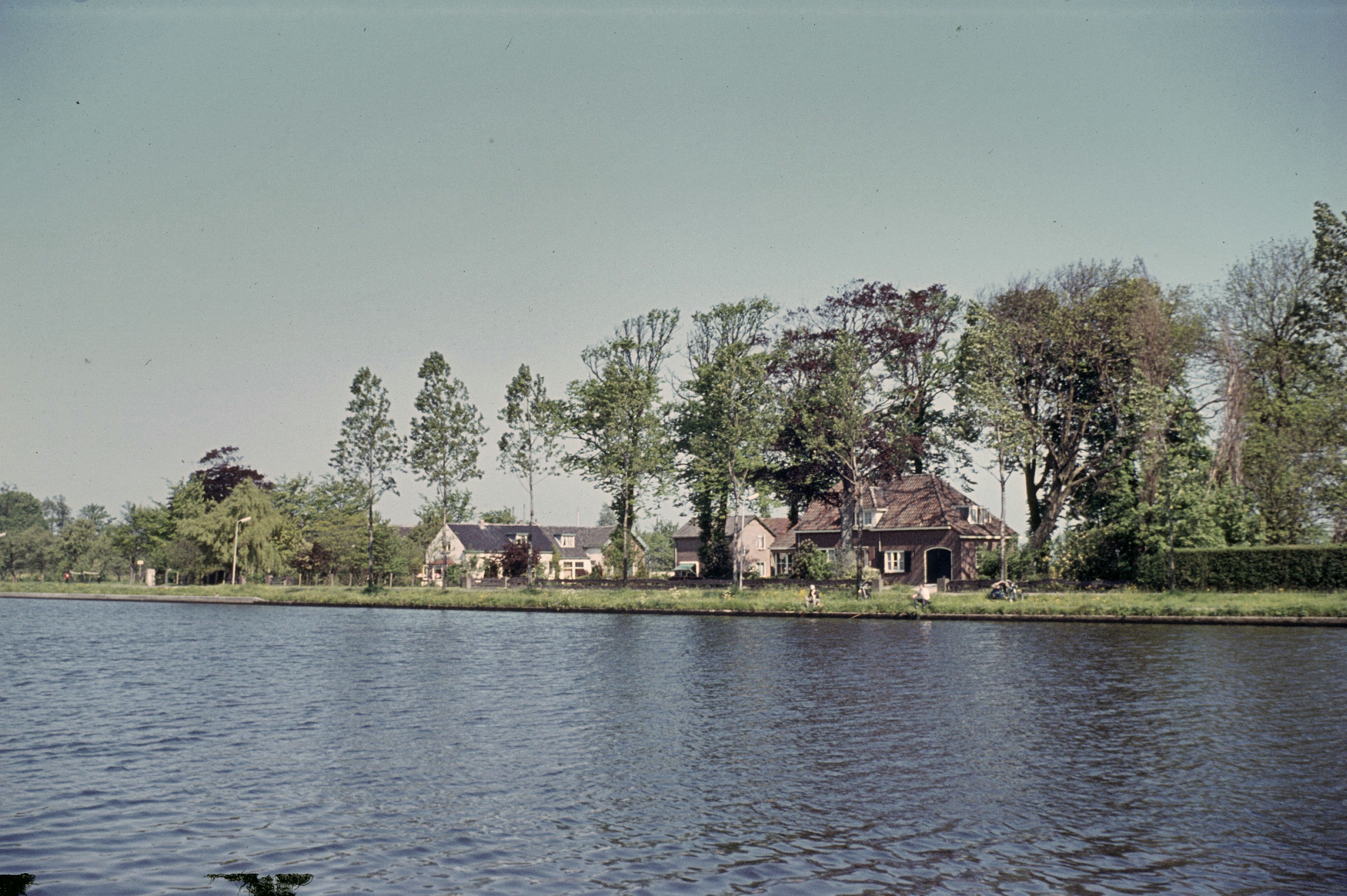
Houses on the river

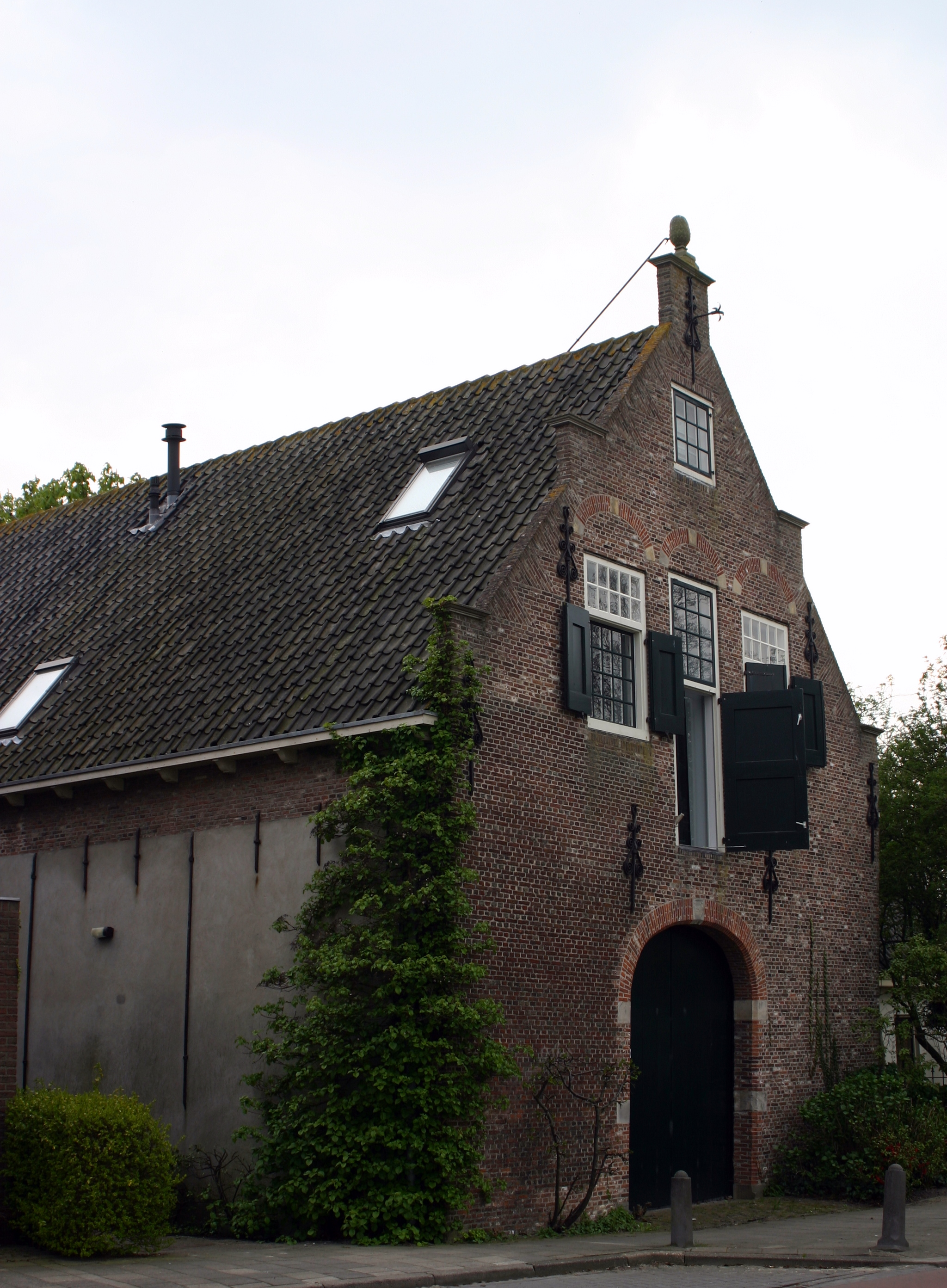
Carriage house Groot-Poelgeest

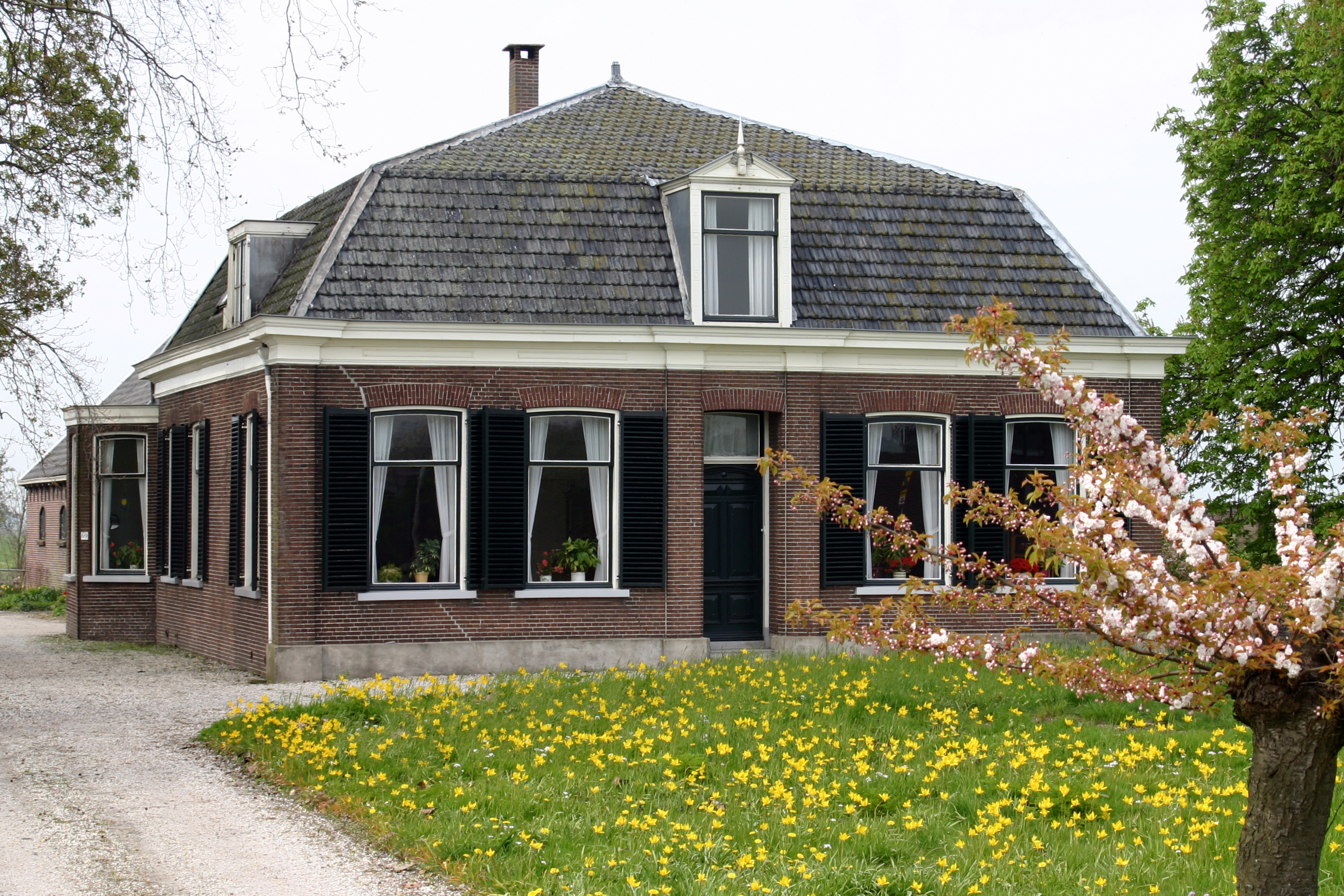
Farm in Koudekerk aan den Rijn
