= Benthuizen =

- Village
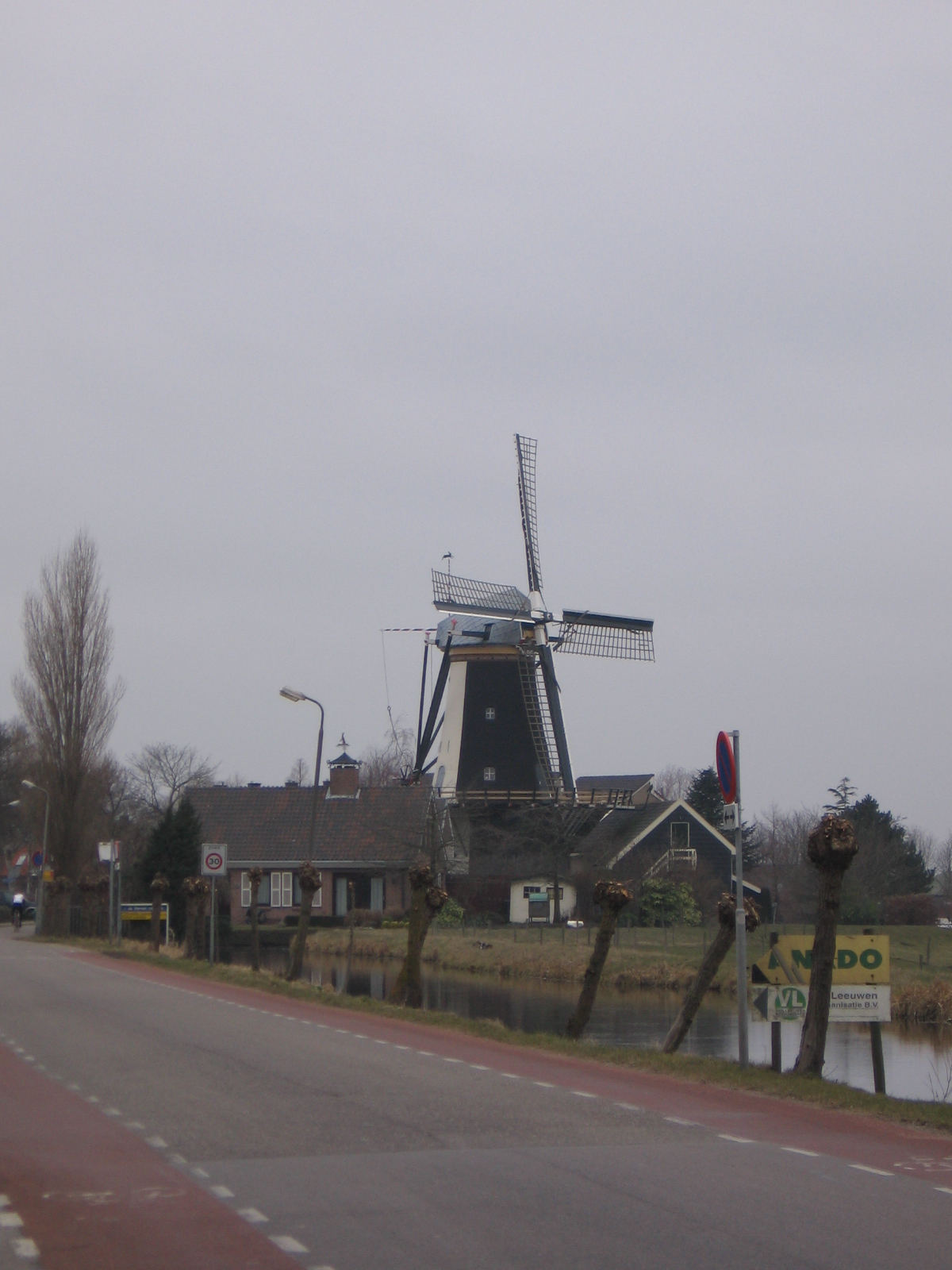
- Windmill De Haas

- Flag Coat of arms

- Location in the province of South Holland in the Netherlands Location in the Netherlands
- Coordinates: 52°5′N 4°33′E
- Country: Netherlands
- Province: South Holland
- Municipality: Alphen aan den Rijn

Area
  - Total: 0.51 km^{2} (0.20 sq mi)
- Elevation: −3.7 m (−12 ft)

Population (2021)
  - Total: 2,900
  - Density: 5,700/km^{2} (15,000/sq mi)
- Time zone: UTC+1 (CET)
  - Summer (DST): UTC+2 (CEST)
- Postal code: 2731
- Dialing code: 079
- Website: alphenaandenrijn.nl

Benthuizen is a village in the Dutch province of South Holland. It is a part of the municipality of Alphen aan den Rijn and lies about 1 km east of Zoetermeer.

== History ==
Benthuizen was described between 1280 and 1287. Benthuizen developed as a peat excavation settlement in the Late Middle Ages.

The Dutch Reformed church is a T-shaped aisleless church which was built between 1796 and 1797. The tower dates from 1672. The church was restored and extended on the north side between 1937 and 1938.

Until 1991 Benthuizen was an independent municipality in that year the municipality became part of the larger municipality Rijneveld. In 1993 the name was changed to Rijnwoude, and in 2014 it became part of Alphen aan den Rijn.

The HSL-Zuid being constructed passes Benthuizen on the eastern side. Also the new Bentwoud (forest) is planted to the east of Benthuizen.

Benthuizen has several buildings that are officially designated monuments. One of these is the historic windmill known as 'De Haas' ('The Hare'). The grist mill dates from 1772. In 1924, an electro motor was installed. Demolition of the windmill was considered several times, but in 1983 restoration began and the windmill was back in service in 1985. The windmill grinds both for human consumption and fodder.

== Gallery ==
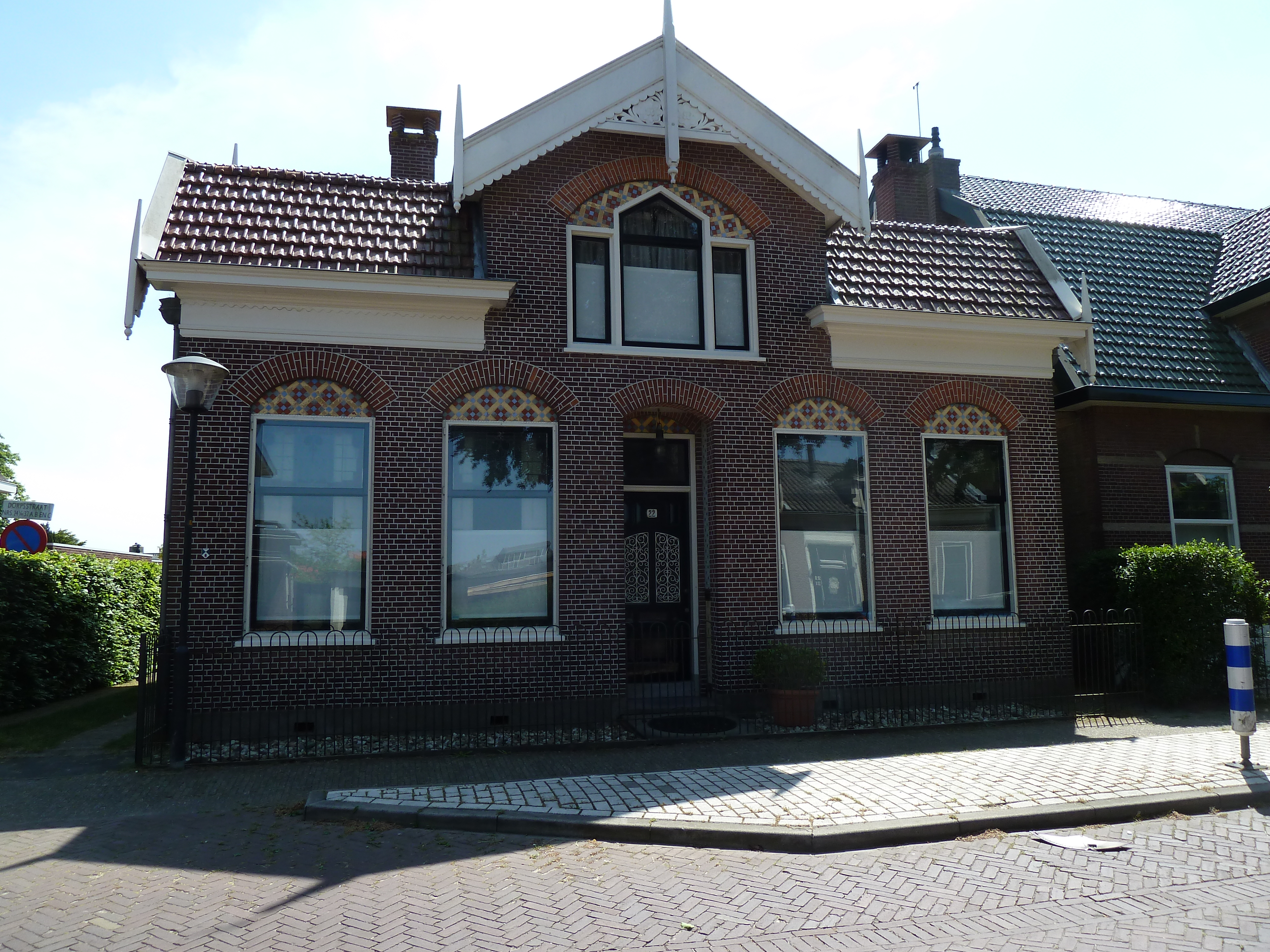
House in Benthuizen

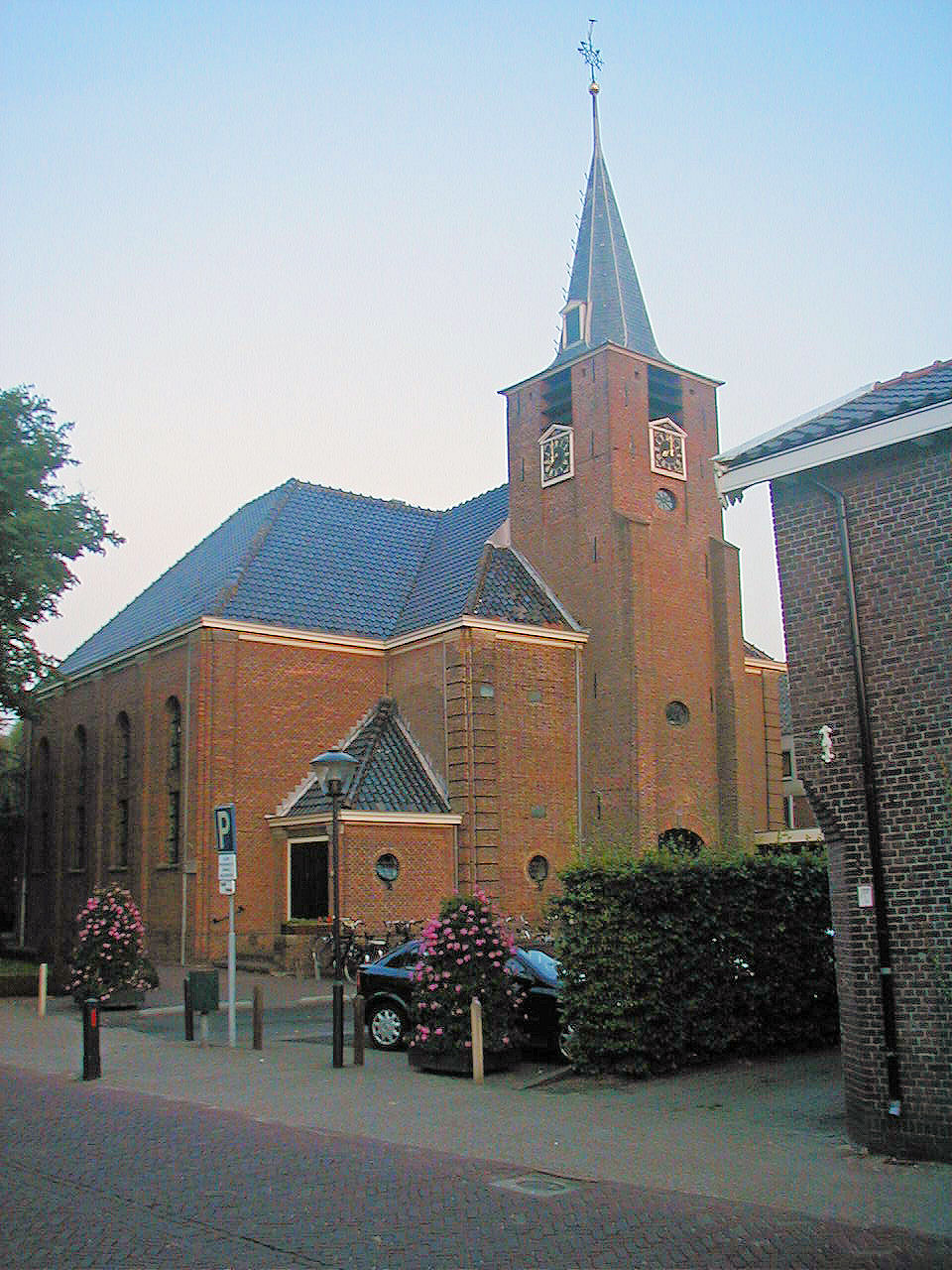
Dutch Reformed church

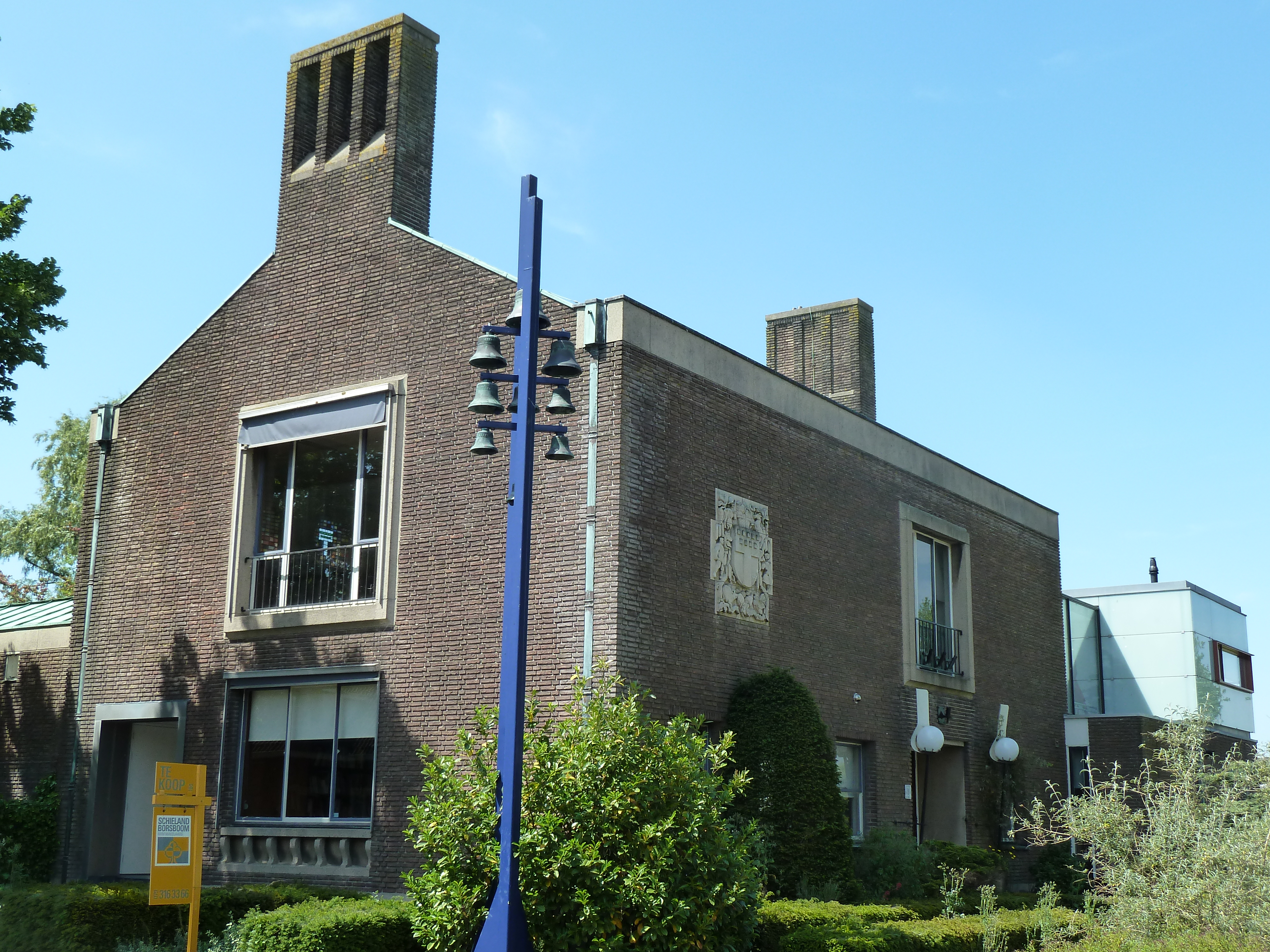
Former town hall

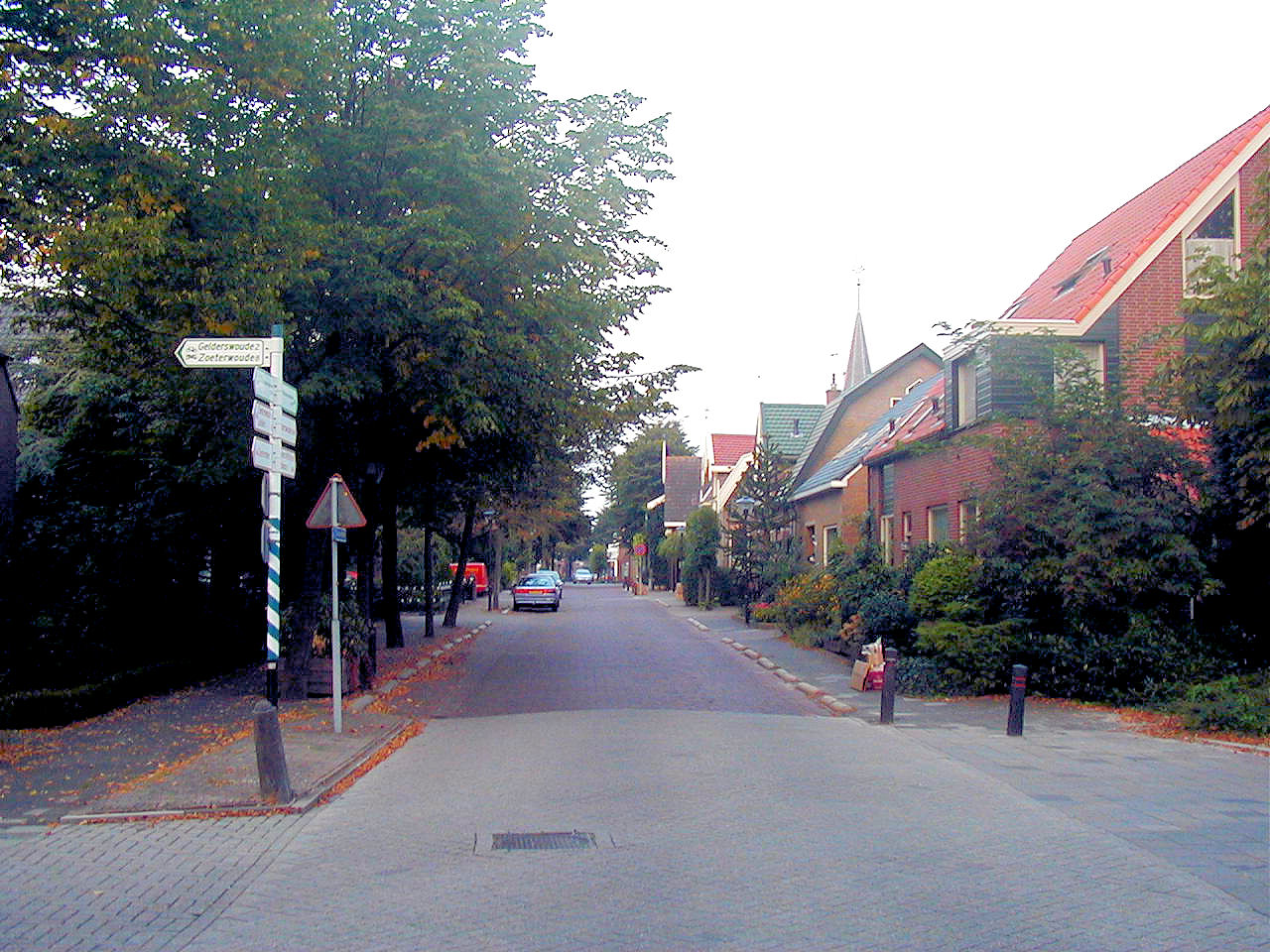
Street view
