= Aarlanderveen =

Place in South Holland, Netherlands

- Village
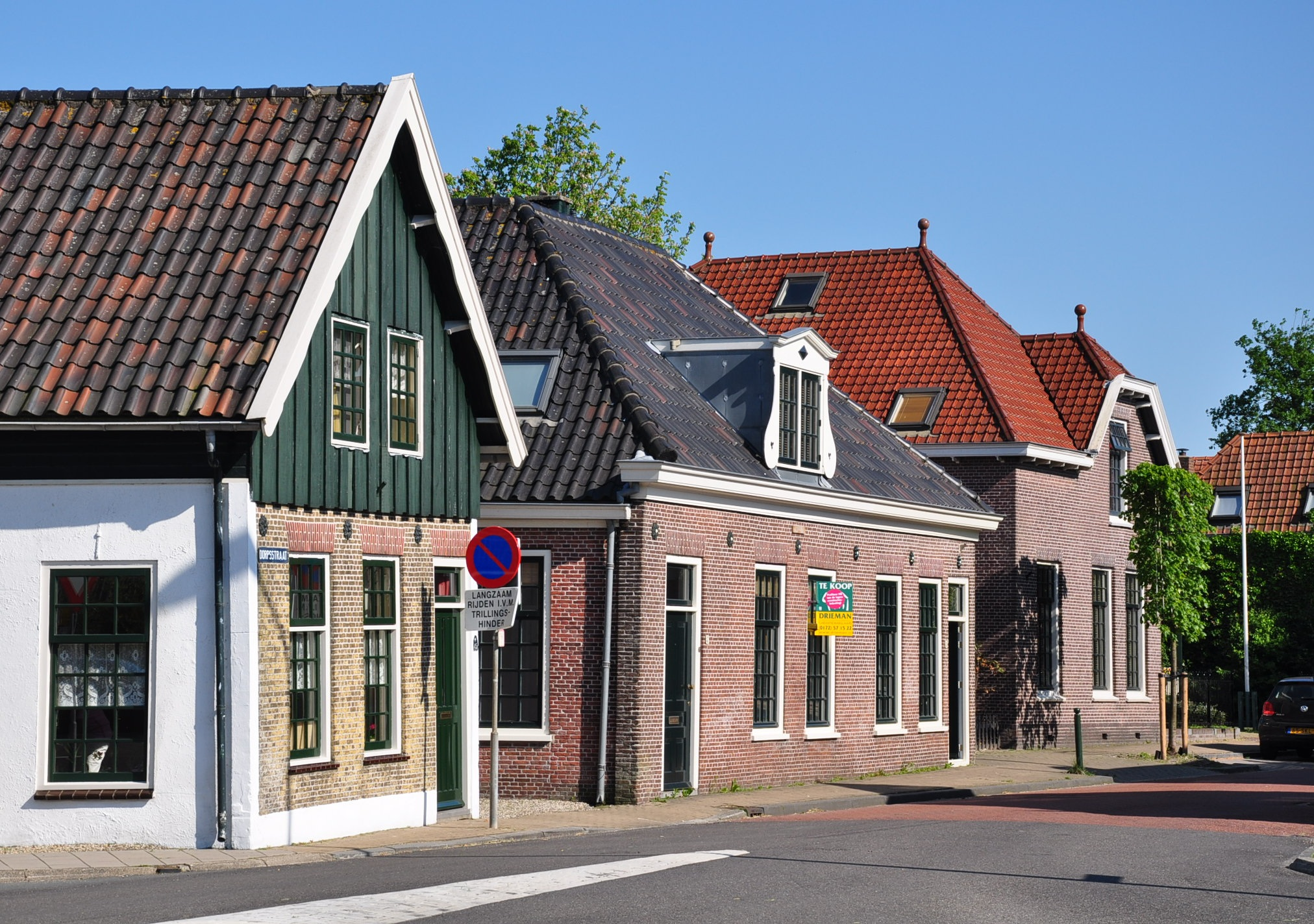
- Street view

- Coat of arms

- Location in the province of South Holland in the Netherlands Location in the Netherlands
- Coordinates: 52°8′N 4°44′E
- Country: Netherlands
- Province: South Holland
- Municipality: Alphen aan den Rijn

Area
  - Total: 19.91 km^{2} (7.69 sq mi)
- Elevation: −3.7 m (−12 ft)

Population (2021)
  - Total: 1,190
  - Density: 59.8/km^{2} (155/sq mi)
- Time zone: UTC+1 (CET)
  - Summer (DST): UTC+2 (CEST)
- Postal code: 2445
- Dialing code: 0172

Aarlanderveen is a village in the Dutch province of South Holland. It is a part of the municipality of Alphen aan den Rijn, and lies about 4 km east of Alphen aan den Rijn.

Aarlanderveen was a peat excavation settlement which developed in the Middle Ages. The Catholic St Peter and Paul Church is a three aisled basilica-like church built by Joseph Cuypers between 1893 and 1894. There are five wind mills near Aarlaanderveen.

Aarlanderveen was a separate municipality until 1918, when it became part of Alphen aan den Rijn.

The area around the village is a natural landscape that is rich in grassland birds like plovers, godwits and redshanks. There are also many flower rich banks including spearwort, water and field mint, ragged robin and marsh thistle.

== Gallery ==
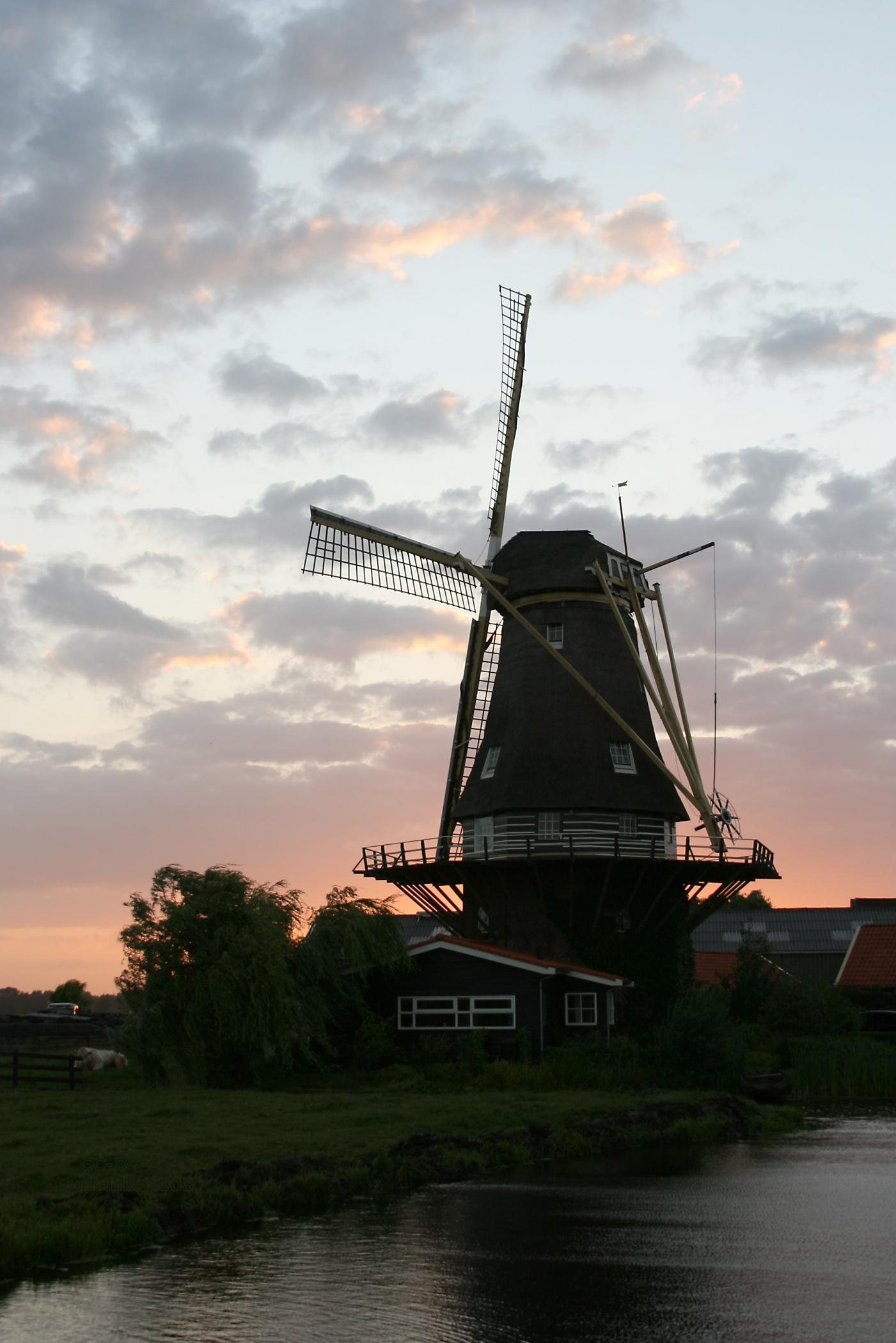
Wind mill De Morgenster

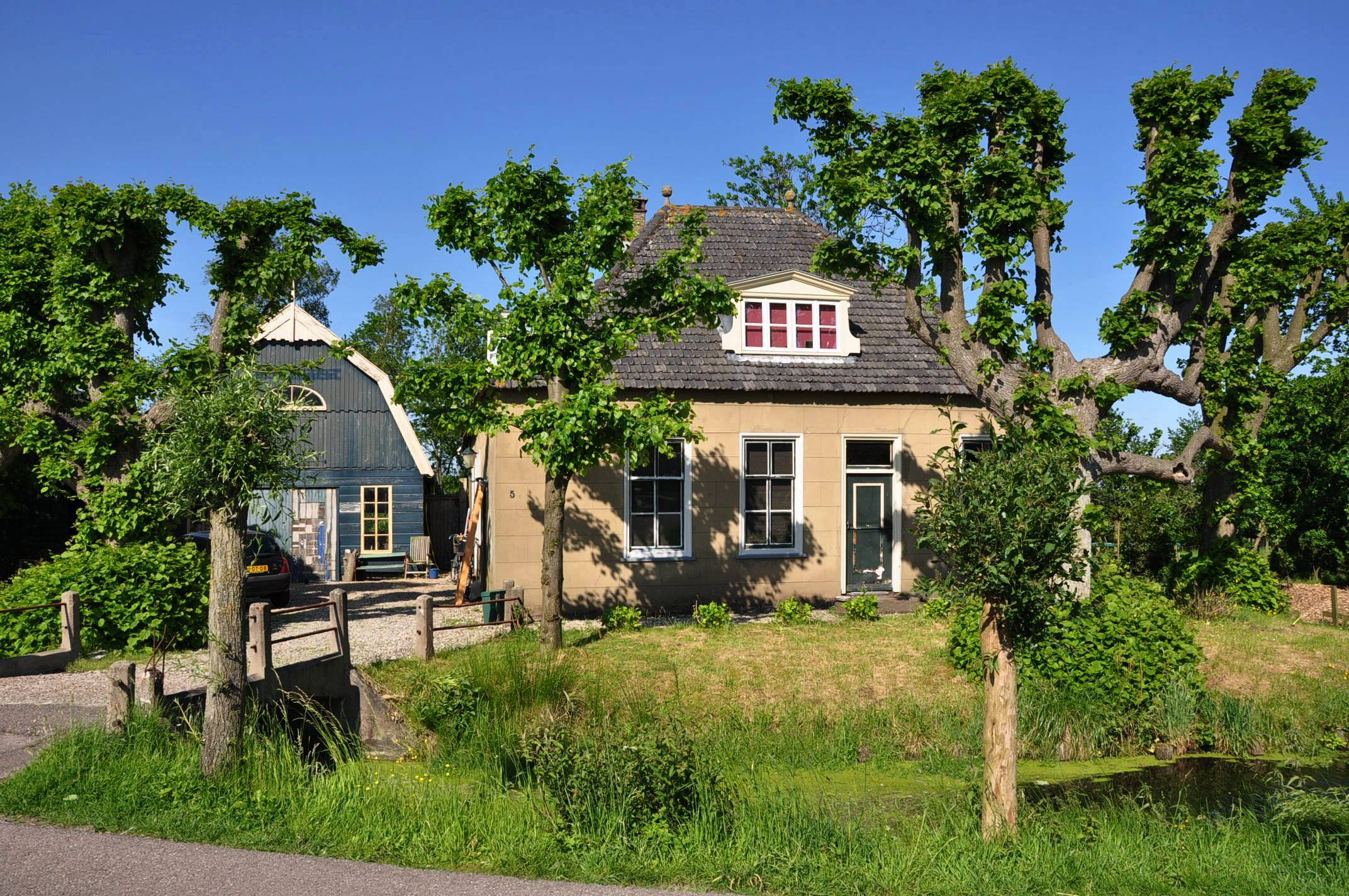
Farm in Aarlanderveen

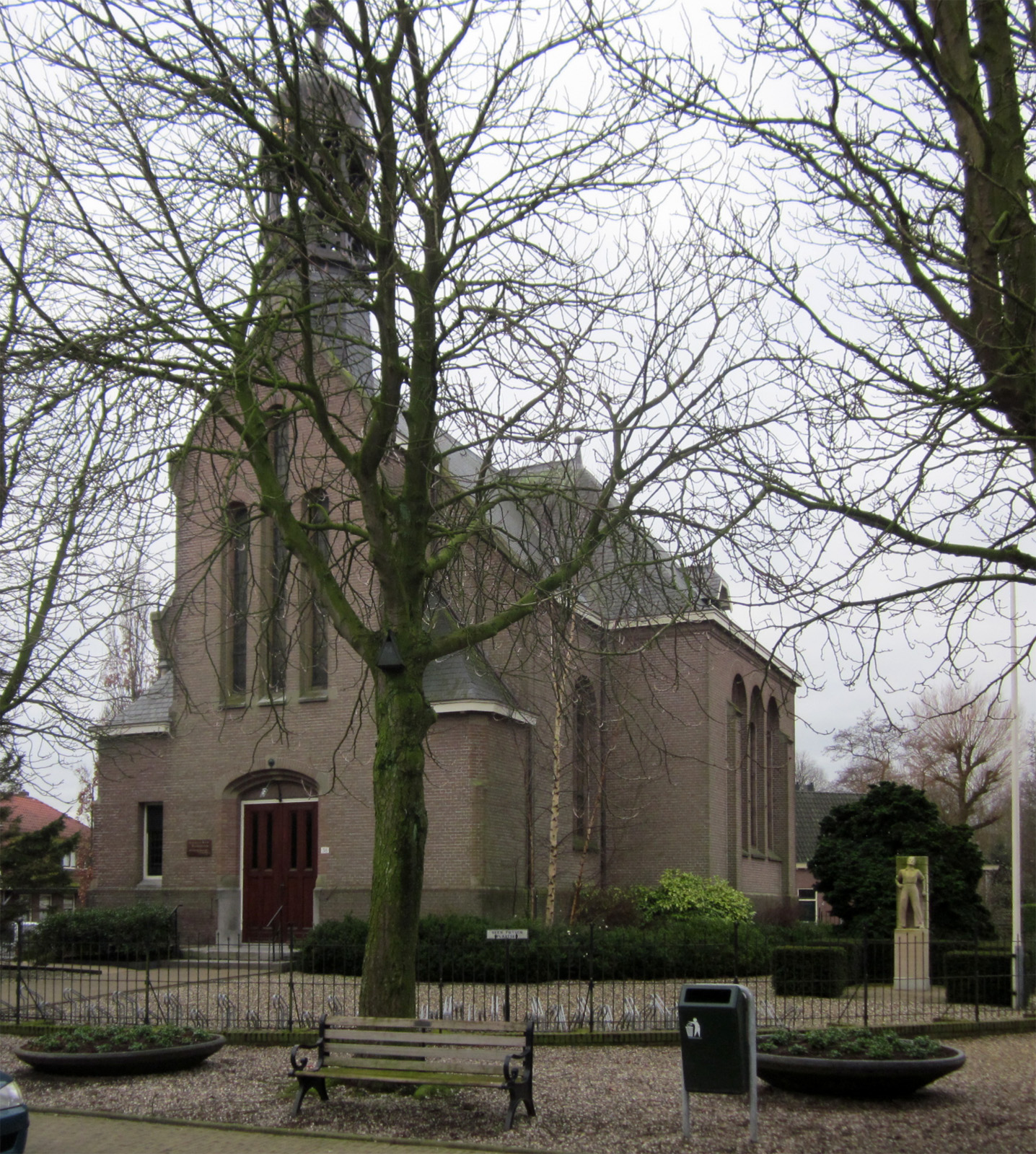
Dutch Reformed church

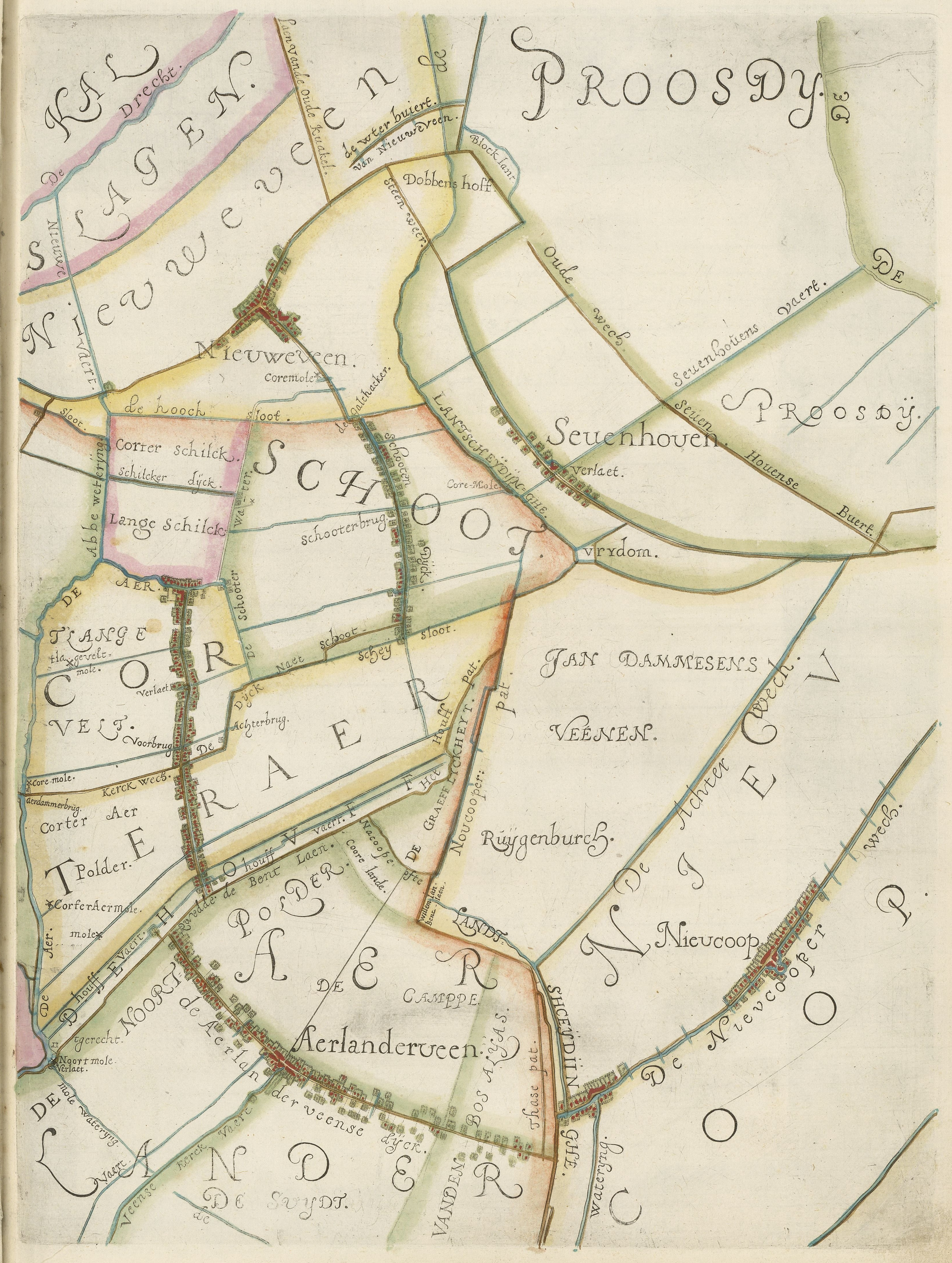
Aarlanderveen on a map of 1611.
