= Alphen aan den Rijn =

Municipality in South Holland, Netherlands

- City and municipality
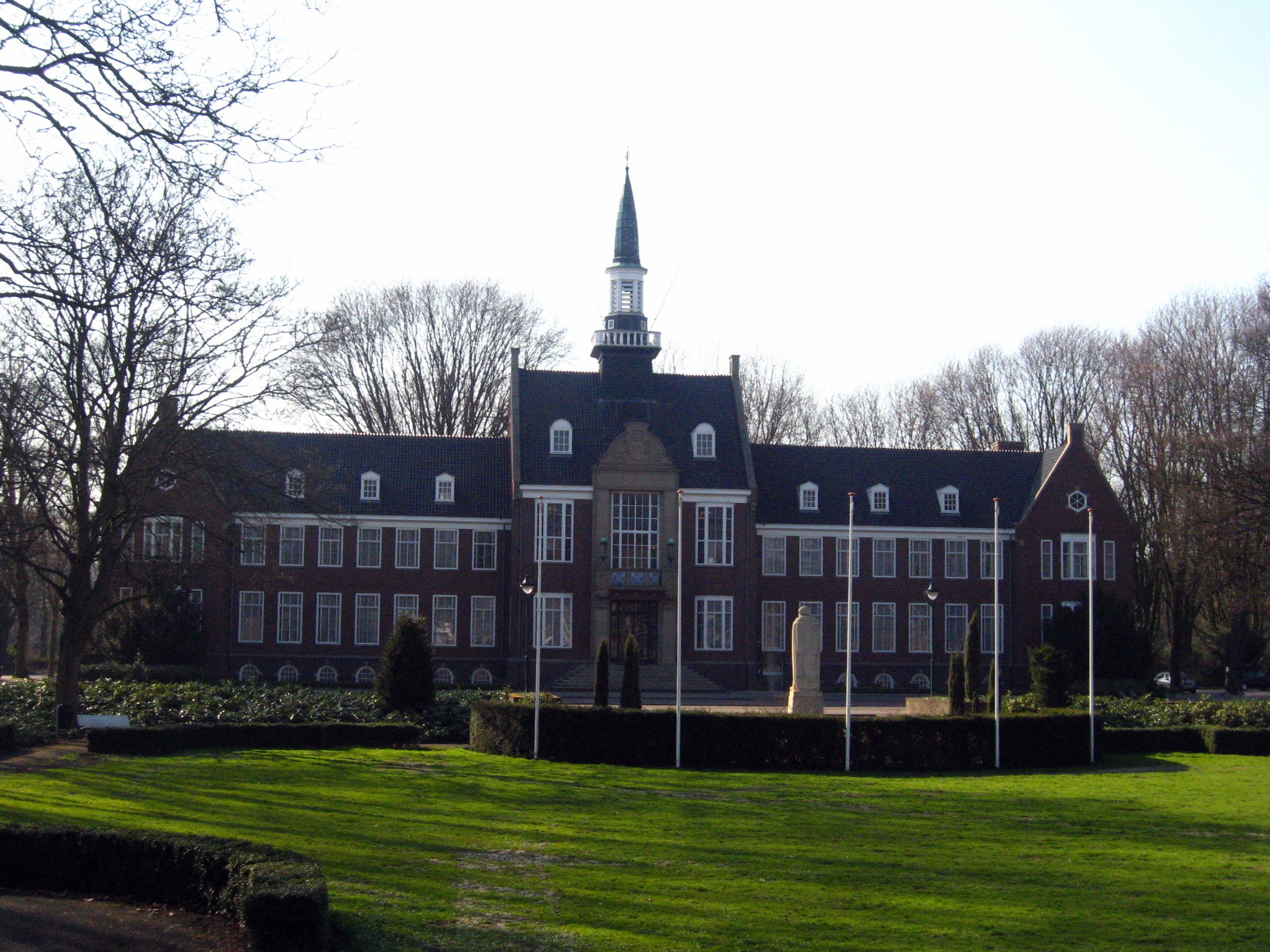
- The former city hall

- Flag Coat of arms

- Location in South Holland
- Coordinates: 52°8′N 4°40′E
- Country: Netherlands
- Province: South Holland

Government
  - Body: Municipal council
  - Mayor: Peter Rehwinkel (PvdA)

Area
  - Total: 132.50 km^{2} (51.16 sq mi)
  - Land: 126.23 km^{2} (48.74 sq mi)
  - Water: 6.27 km^{2} (2.42 sq mi)
- Elevation: 2 m (6.6 ft)

Population (January 2021)
  - Total: 112,587
  - Density: 892/km^{2} (2,310/sq mi)
- Demonym: Alphenaar
- Time zone: UTC+1 (CET)
  - Summer (DST): UTC+2 (CEST)
- Postcode: 2390–2409, 2445, 2470–2471, 2730–2731, 2770–2771
- Area code: 0172
- Website: www.alphenaandenrijn.nl

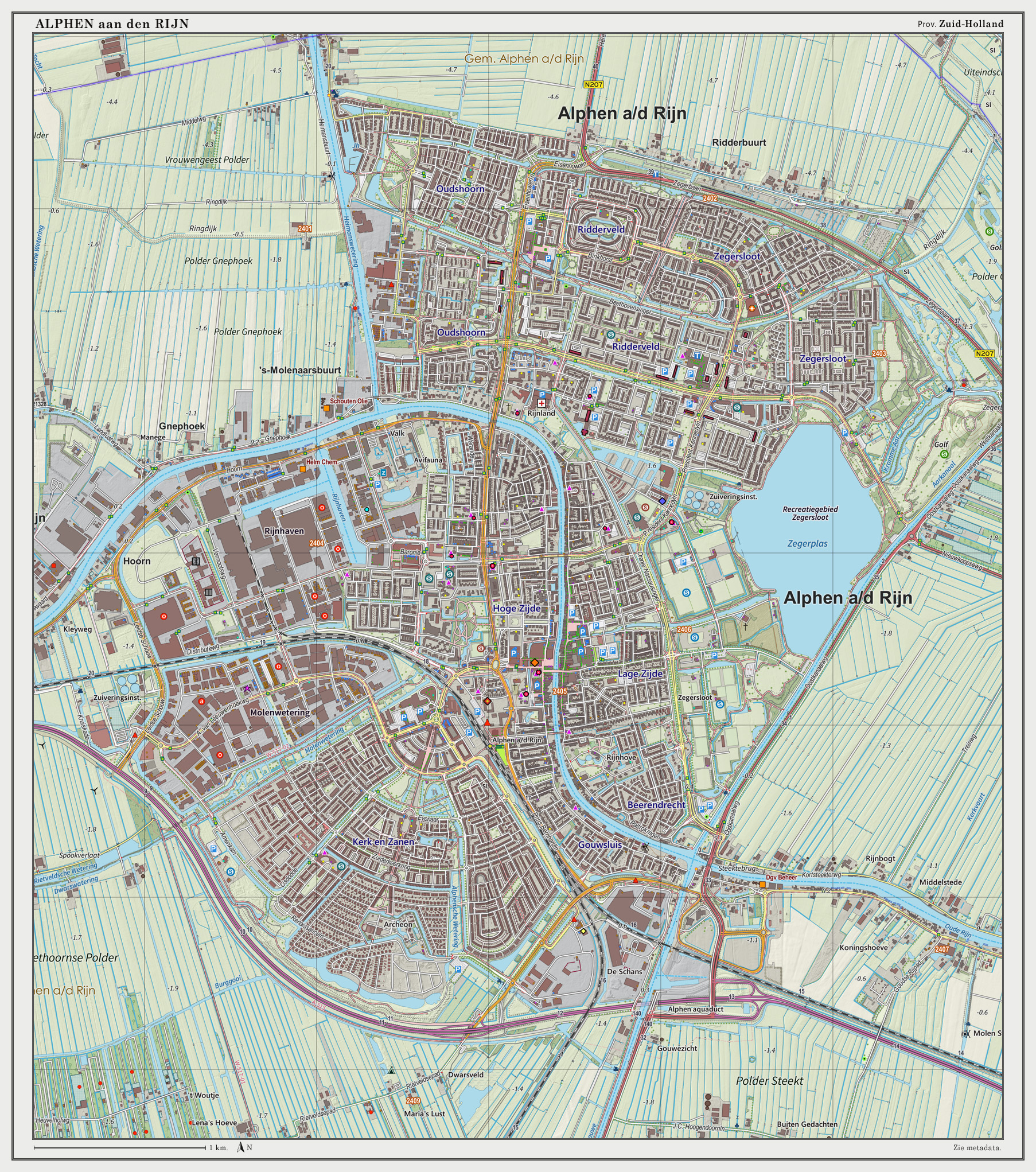
Topographic map of Alphen aan den Rijn, September 2014

Alphen aan den Rijn (Dutch pronunciation: [ˈɑlfə(n) aːn də(n) ˈrɛin]; English: "Alphen upon Rhine" or "Alphen on the Rhine") is a city and municipality in the western Netherlands, in the province of South Holland. The city is situated on the banks of the river Oude Rijn (Old Rhine), where the River Gouwe branches off. The municipality had a population of 112,587 in 2021, and covers an area of 132.50 km^{2} (51.16 sq mi), of which 6.27 km^{2} (2.42 sq mi) is water.

The municipality of Alphen aan den Rijn also includes the communities of Aarlanderveen, Benthuizen, Boskoop, Hazerswoude-Dorp, Hazerswoude-Rijndijk, Koudekerk aan den Rijn and Zwammerdam. The city is located in what is called the 'Green Heart' of the Netherlands, which is a somewhat less densely populated centre area of the Randstad.

The name "Alphen" is probably derived from the name of the Roman fort Albaniana, meaning "settlement at the white water". Its remains still lie under the city centre.

== History ==
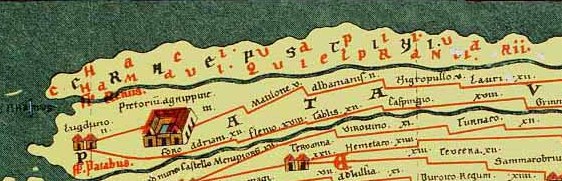
Map showing Albanianis (in the centre, just above the 'T' of Patabus) in the Tabula Peutingeriana.

The area around Alphen aan den Rijn has been inhabited for 2000 years. In the Roman era, the Oude Rijn was the main branch of the Rhine River and formed the north border of the Roman Empire. Since the rule of Emperor Claudius (41–54 AD), divisions of the Roman army were stationed here. Consequently, several Roman fortifications were located along the Oude Rijn, including castellum Albanianae in the centre of Alphen. The Romans had also built the first bridge over the Oude Rijn. Alphen was therefore an important commercial site in the area until Germanic raids ended that in 240 AD.

After recurring problems with flooding, especially in Utrecht and Leiden, the Oude Rijn was dammed at Wijk bij Duurstede in 1122, thereby making the Lek River the main branch of the Rhine. The Oude Rijn has not flooded since. During the Middle Ages, Alphen was a fiefdom called Alphen en Rietveld.

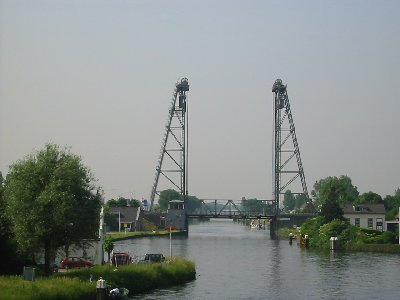
The vertical-lift bridge over the Gouwe River was built in the 1930s.

In the 17th century, Alphen became prominent again as a hub for commerce. The Oude Rijn was used for boat traffic; there are still portions along the river where the towpath is present.

The current municipality was formed in 1918 through the amalgamation of the smaller municipalities of Alphen, Aarlanderveen, and Oudshoorn. In 1964, the municipality of Zwammerdam was added as well. In 2014 the municipalities of Boskoop and Rijnwoude were amalgamated as well, doubling the land area and increasing the population to over 100,000.

During the Second World War, the majority of Jews from Alphen were deported and subsequently murdered; only a few survived. After the war, the Jewish congregation was disbanded and merged with the one in Leiden. A Jewish cemetery on the Aarkade was founded in 1802, but it was abandoned and razed in the 1960s, with the remains reinterred in Katwijk; in 2012, after fifteen years of community activism by local historian Anke Bakker and CDA council member Alice Besseling, a monument was installed and the area turned into a city park.

Since the 1950s, the city began to grow rapidly. A large new neighbourhood was built on the north side and Alphen became mostly a commuter city. Other urban developments however did create local employment. Since the 1990s, a similar new development was built at the city's south side.

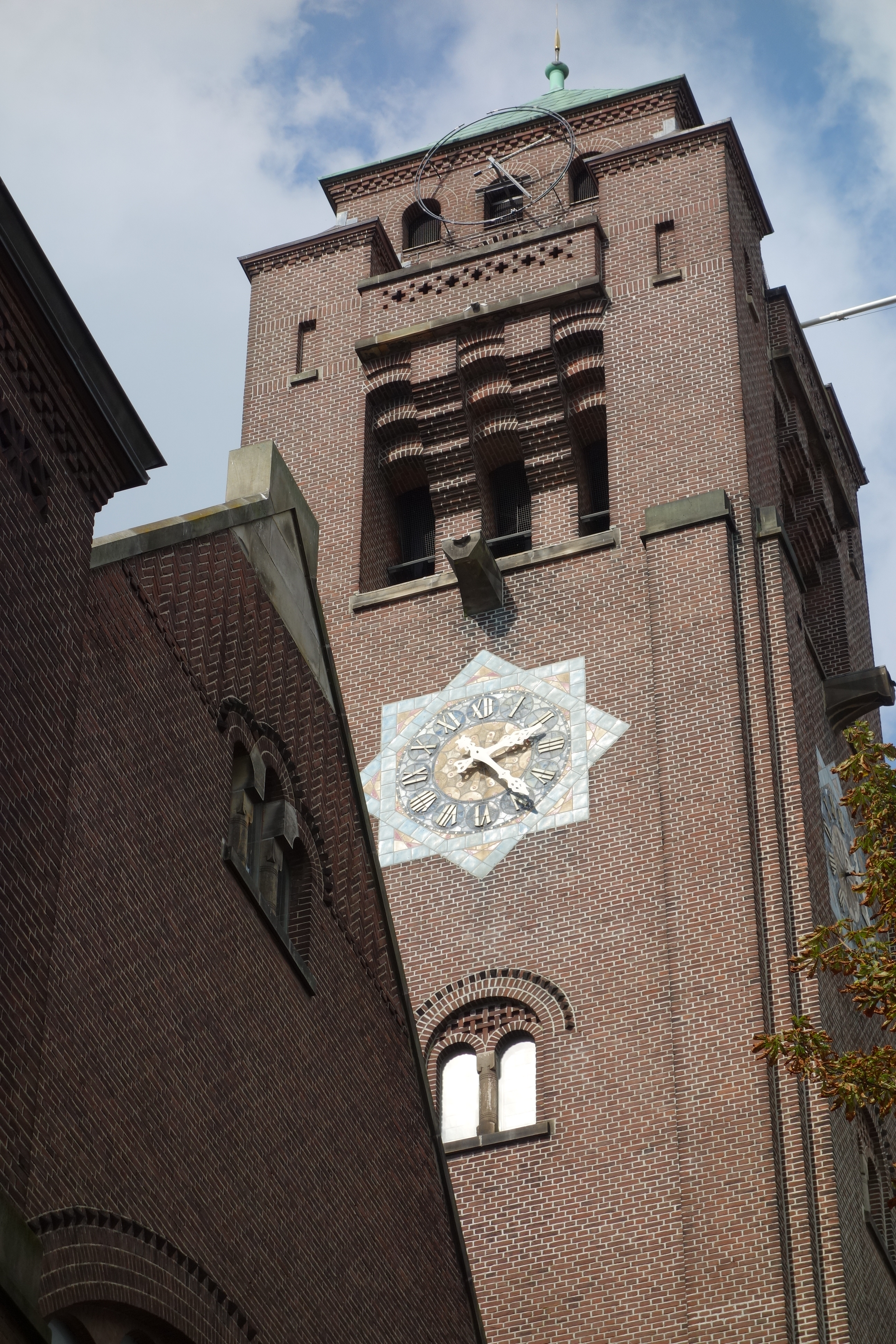
Monumental clocktower in Alphen aan den Rijn

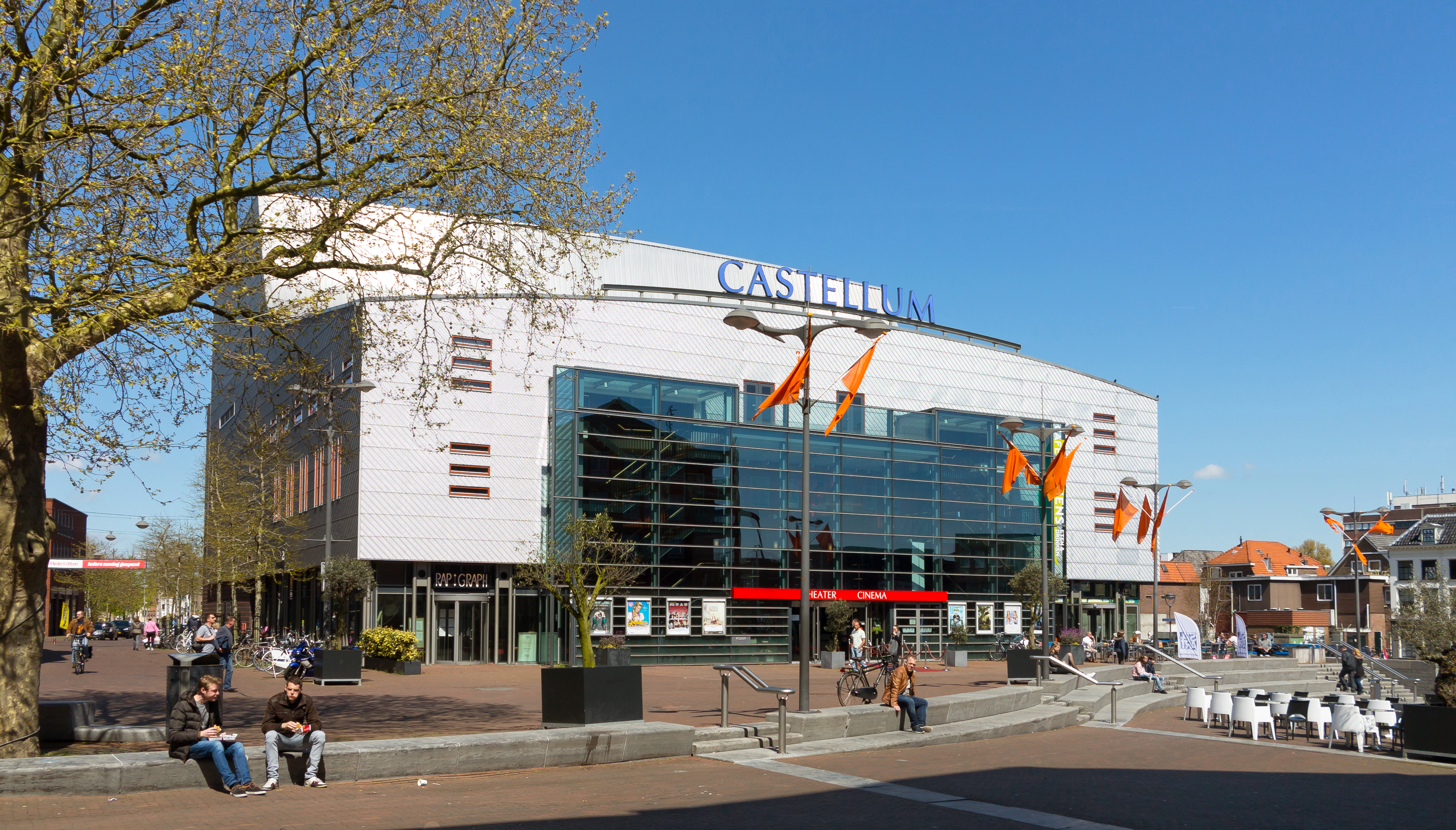
Theater Castellum

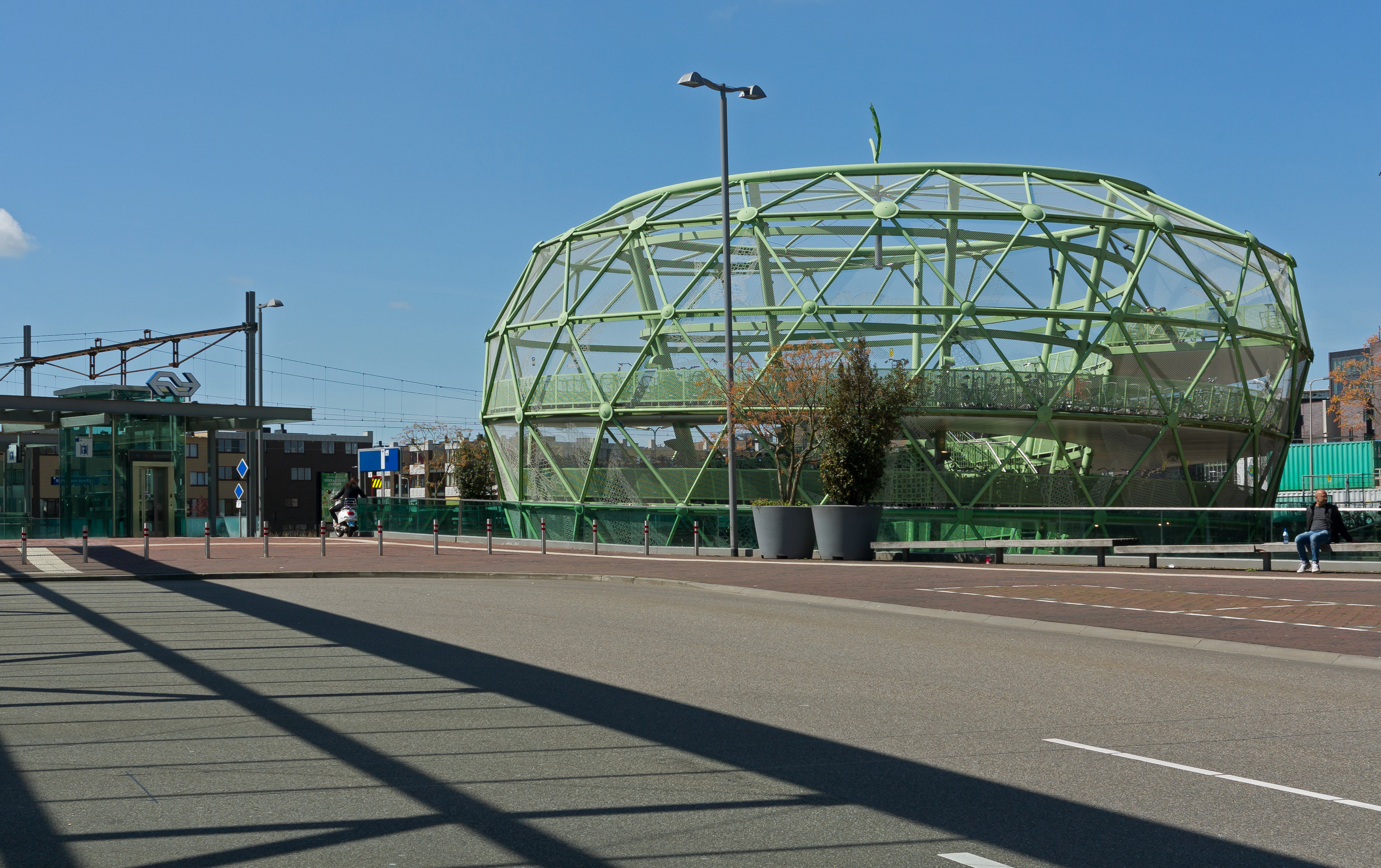
Railway and bicycle parking station

In recent years, a large part of the city centre has undergone a full urban renewal. Many buildings from the 1950s and earlier have been demolished to make place for modern architecture. This "masterplan" included the addition of a new public square next to the riverbank, the construction of a performing arts theatre/cinema, an upgrade of local shops and the creation of pedestrian streets. As of 2006, all of these projects on the left riverbank Hoge Zijde have been finished and a new similar masterplan for the right riverbank Lage Zijde has been developed and is being executed now.

On 9 April 2011, a gunman opened fire at a shopping centre in Alphen aan den Rijn, killing six people and subsequently taking his own life.

On 3 August 2015, a newly built bridge flap of the Juliana Bridge, under renovation, on the Oude Rijn collapsed. It was being hoisted by two cranes, different in size, floating on a pontoon that was not stabilized. It became unbalanced shortly after the lifting started, fell and collapsed onto buildings. There were no injuries and fatalities, many inhabitants having already cleared the area. In total, 51 properties were damaged.

== Demographics ==
- Native Dutch people: 78,8%
- Other European people and second-generation descendants: 9,5%
- Turkish people: 1.3%
- Moroccan people: 2.7%
- Surinamese people: 1.8%
- People from the Netherlands Antilles and Aruba: 0.9%
- Other non-natives: 5%

== Tourism ==
Alphen aan den Rijn has the following attractions:

- Avifauna Bird Park – the world's first dedicated bird park, opened in 1950.
- Archeon – an archeological park about Dutch History, with ruins and reenactments, including 43 replica buildings from prehistoric, Roman, and Medieval eras. It opened in 1994.
- Zegersloot Recreation Park – park with an artificial lake, popular for hiking, cycling, windsurfing, wakeboarding and water skiing.

== Events ==
- 20 van Alphen – International 20 kilometres run. Held every year (since 1952) on the second Sunday of March. The 2006 event was marked by a world record when Haile Gebrselassie posted a time of 1 hour 11 minutes 37 seconds for 25 km. This was his 22nd world record breaking performance.
- Year market – third Wednesday in September. Regional products.
- Lakeside Festival – end of August. Music festival near Zegersloot.
- Old timer day – second Saturday of September. Old cars, tractors, steam engines.
- LAURA – four-day bicycle event Leiden, Amsterdam, Utrecht, Rotterdam and Alphen aan den Rijn which is the start and finish place, is held the first week of July.
- Tean International – Challenger level ATP Tour tennis tournament, played at the Alphense Tennis Club, from 30 August to 8 September 2008.
- Midwinter Fair and Midzomer Fair – Fantasy festivals at the Archeon.
- Vakantiespel – One of the largest events for children between 6 and 12-year-old in the Netherlands. Held every year in August.

== Public transport ==
The town is served by Alphen aan den Rijn railway station. It is just south east of the town centre. The bus station is located near the railway station.

== Economy ==
The information and publishing company Wolters Kluwer is based in Alphen aan den Rijn.

== Notable people ==
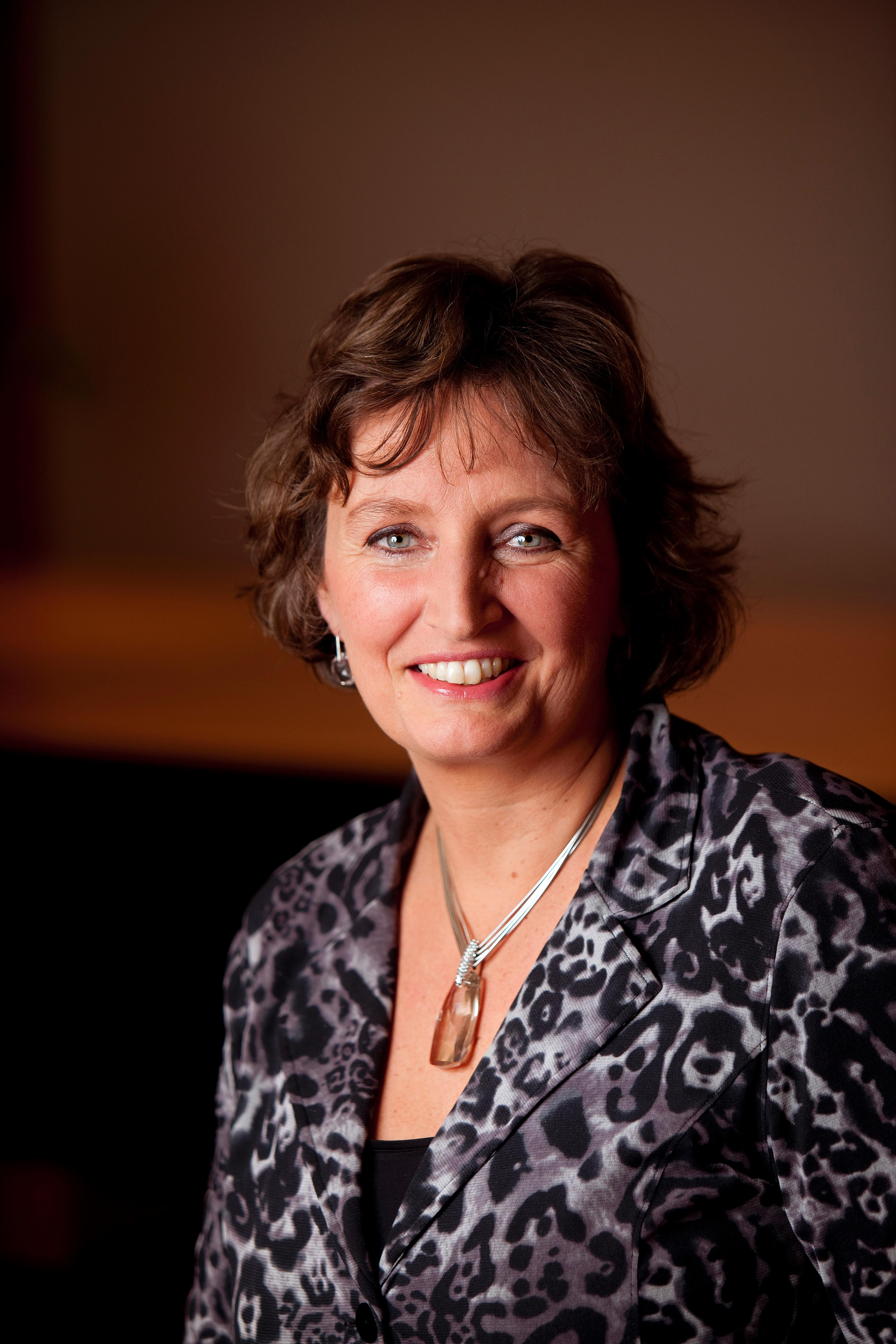
Liesbeth Spies, 2012

- Quirijn van Brekelenkam (1622/29 in Zwammerdam – 1669/79), a Dutch Baroque genre painter
- George Pieter Willem Boers (1811 in Hazerswoude – 1884), an East Indies Army colonel and Governor of the Dutch Gold Coast
- J.C. Bloem (1887 Oudshoorn – 1966), a Dutch poet and essayist
- Maartje Offers (1891 in Koudekerk – 1944), a Dutch classical contralto singer
- Lykele Faber (1919 in Koudekerk - 2009), a Dutch resistance commando and radio operator
- Roel van den Broek (born 1931), a Dutch religious scholar and academic
- Matthijs van Heijningen (born 1944), a Dutch film producer
- Bas Eenhoorn (born 1946), a politician and management consultant, Mayor of Alpen 2010–2012
- Tonny van de Vondervoort (born 1950), a Dutch politician, State Secretary for the Interior
- Harald Prins (born 1951), a Dutch anthropologist, ethnohistorian and filmmaker
- Marian Bakermans-Kranenburg (born 1965), a scientist and academic focused on pedagogy and family relations
- Liesbeth Spies (born 1966), a Dutch politician, Mayor of Alphen aan den Rijn since 2014
- Arvin Slagter (born 1985), a Dutch basketball player, winner of Olympic Gold in 3x3 basketball at the 2024 Summer Olympics in Paris
- Abid Tounssi (born 1981), stage name Salah Edin, a Dutch Moroccan rapper and actor

=== Sport ===
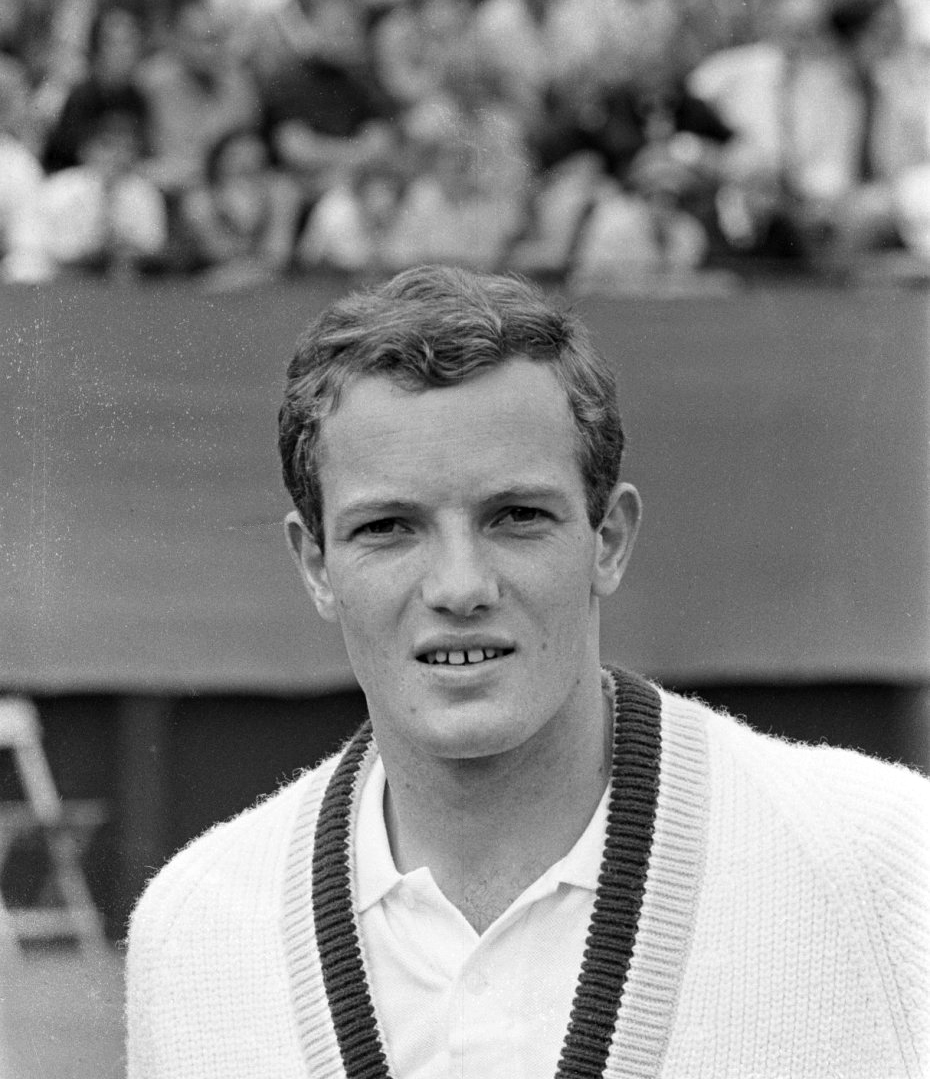
Tom Okker, 1964

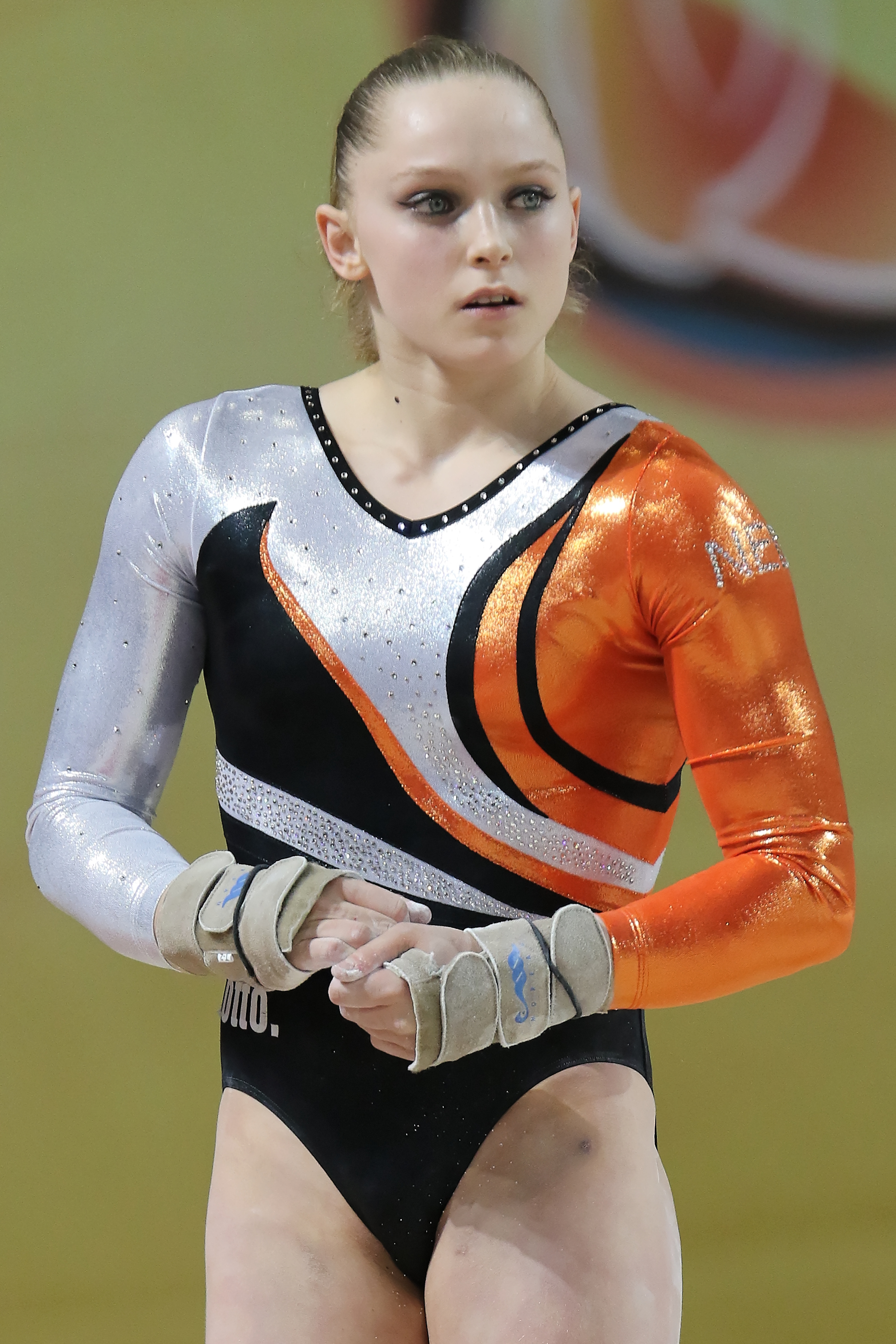
Noël van Klaveren, 2015

- Wim Schouten (1878–1941), a sailor, competed at the 1928 Summer Olympics
- Petrus Wernink (1895 in Oudshoorn – 1971), a sailor, competed at the 1920 Summer Olympics
- Tom Okker (born 1944 in Hazerswoude), a Dutch former tennis player, world No. 3 in 1974
- Dido Havenaar (born 1957 in Hazerswoude), a former Japanese football player with 302 club caps
- Bettine Vriesekoop (born 1961 in Hazerswoude), a former table tennis player
- Ron van Teylingen (born 1967 in Boskoop) is a sailor, competed at the 1992 and 1996 Summer Olympics
- Hans Nieuwenburg (born 1968 in Koudekerk), a former water polo defender, competed in two Summer Olympics
- Wouter van Pelt (born 1968), a former Dutch field hockey player, with 236 international caps
- Peter van Niekerk (born 1971 in Hazerswoude), a sailor, competed at the 2000 and 2004 Summer Olympics
- Arjan van Heusden (born 1972), a Dutch former football goalkeeper with 206 club caps
- Mark van der Zijden (born 1973 in Boskoop), a former freestyle swimmer, team bronze medallist at the 2000 Summer Olympics
- Evert-Jan 't Hoen (born 1975), a Dutch baseball player, competed in three Summer Olympics
- Wilbert Pennings (born 1975), a Dutch high jumper, competed in the 2000 Summer Olympics
- Jeannette Pennings (born 1977), a Dutch bobsledder and track and field athlete
- Martin Verkerk (born 1978 in Leiderdorp), a retired professional Dutch tennis player
- John Heitinga (born 1983), a Dutch football coach and former player with 324 club caps
- Noël van Klaveren (born 1995), a Dutch artistic gymnast
- Jelle Sels (born 1995), a Dutch tennis player
- Thijs Timmermans (born 1998), a Dutch football player
- Kerstin Casparij (born 2000), a Dutch football player

== Gallery ==
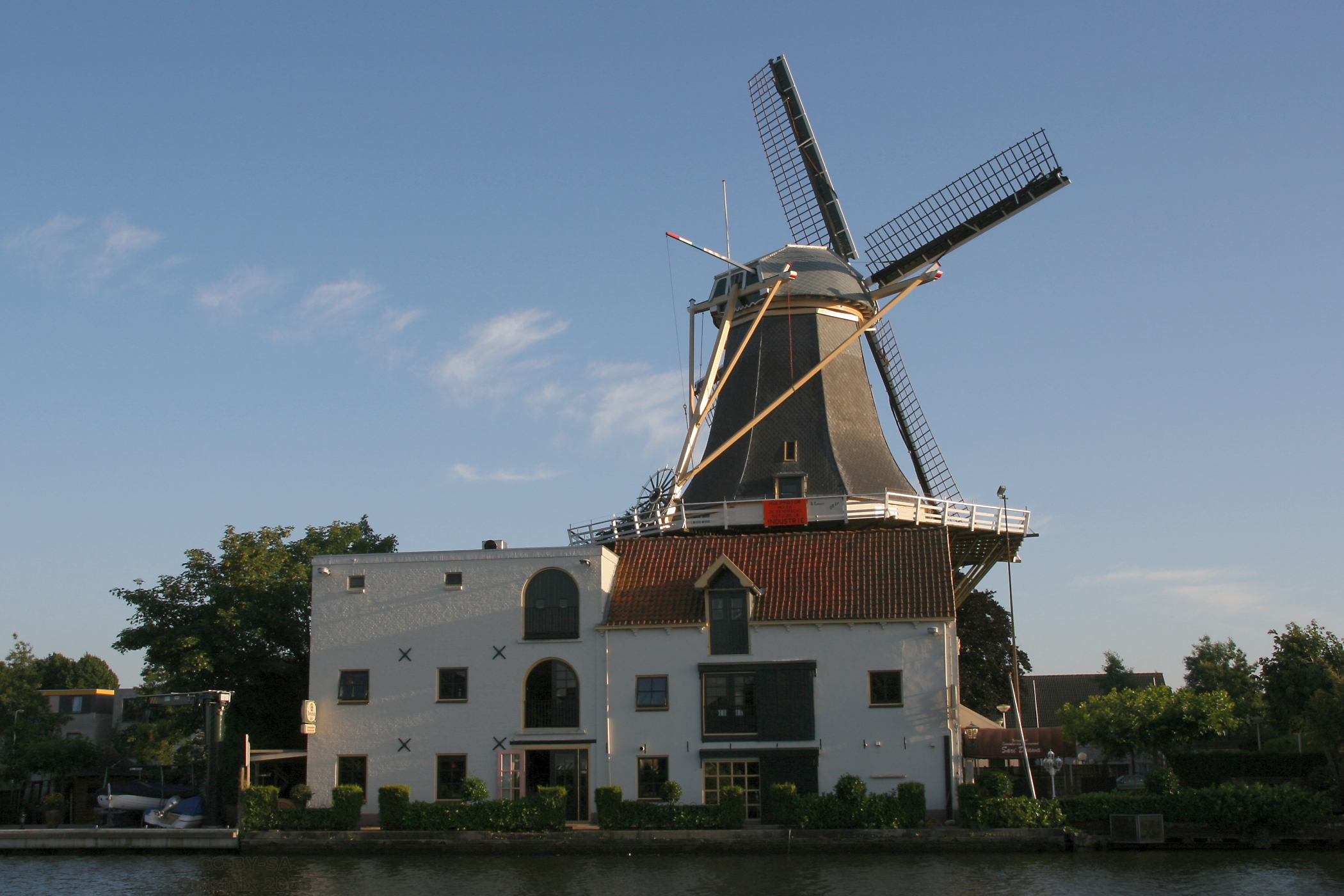
Alphen aan den Rijn - De Eendracht

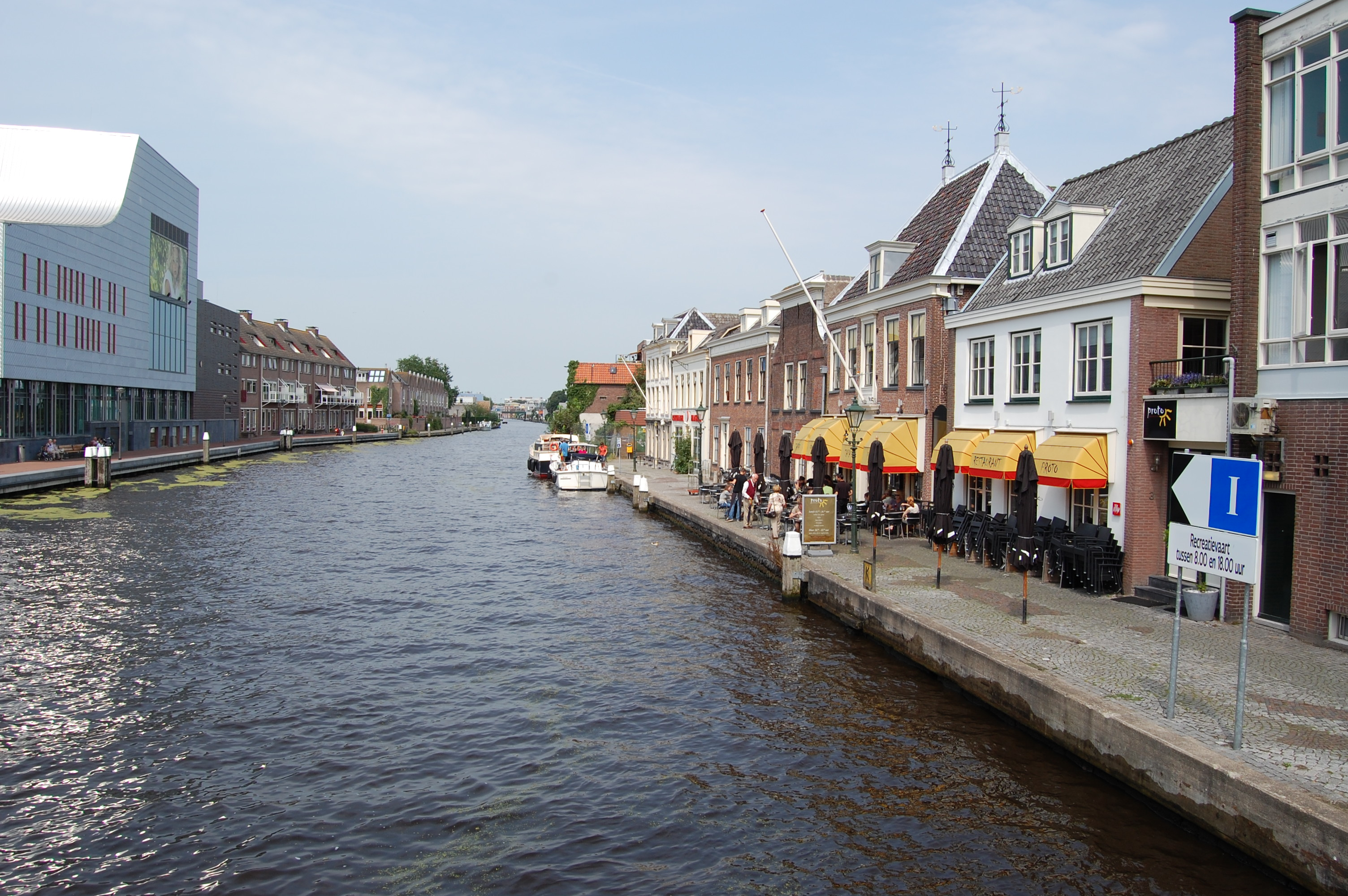
Oude Rijn quayside Alphen Centrum

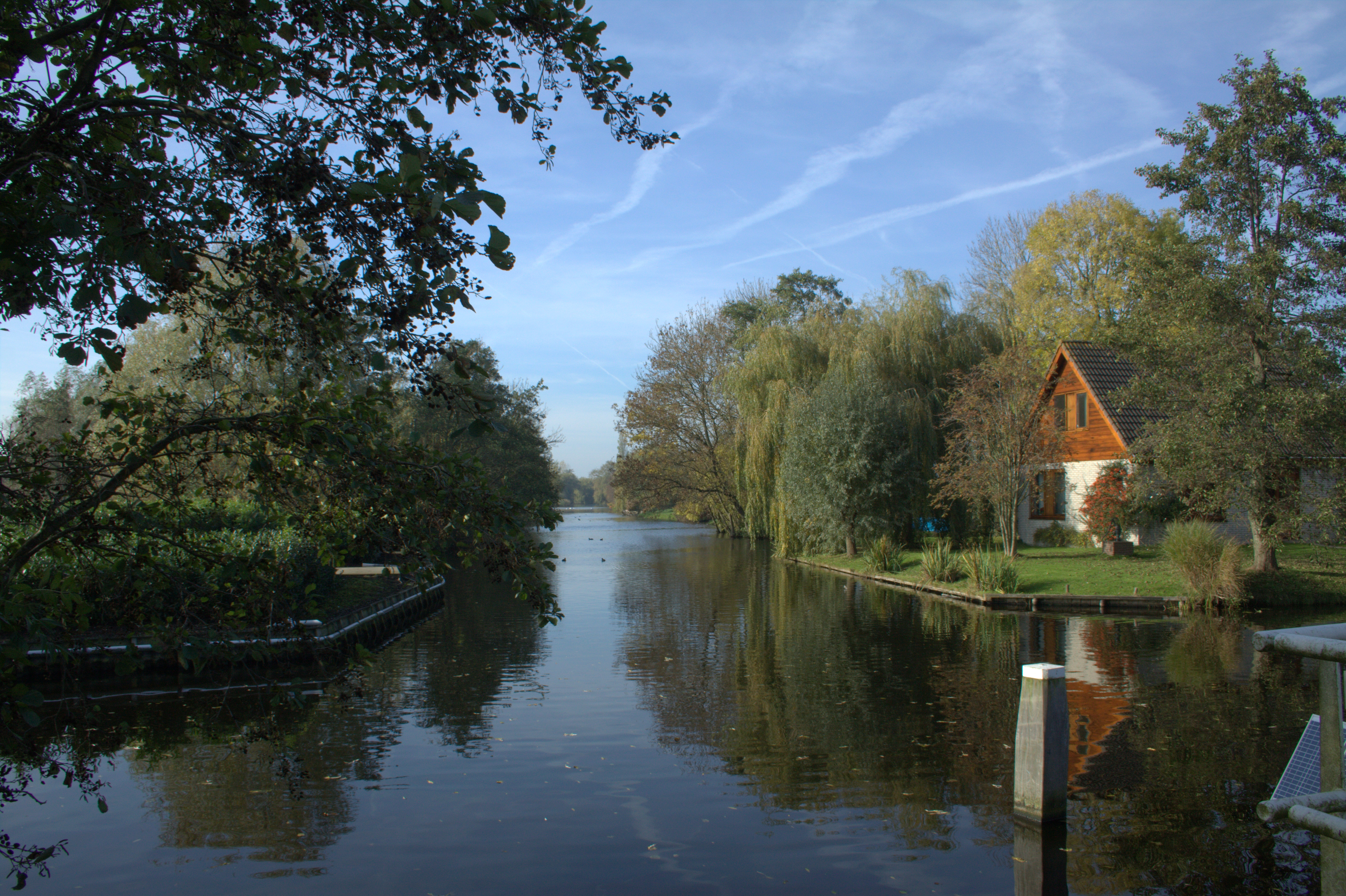
Rietveld bij Hazerswoude-Dorp

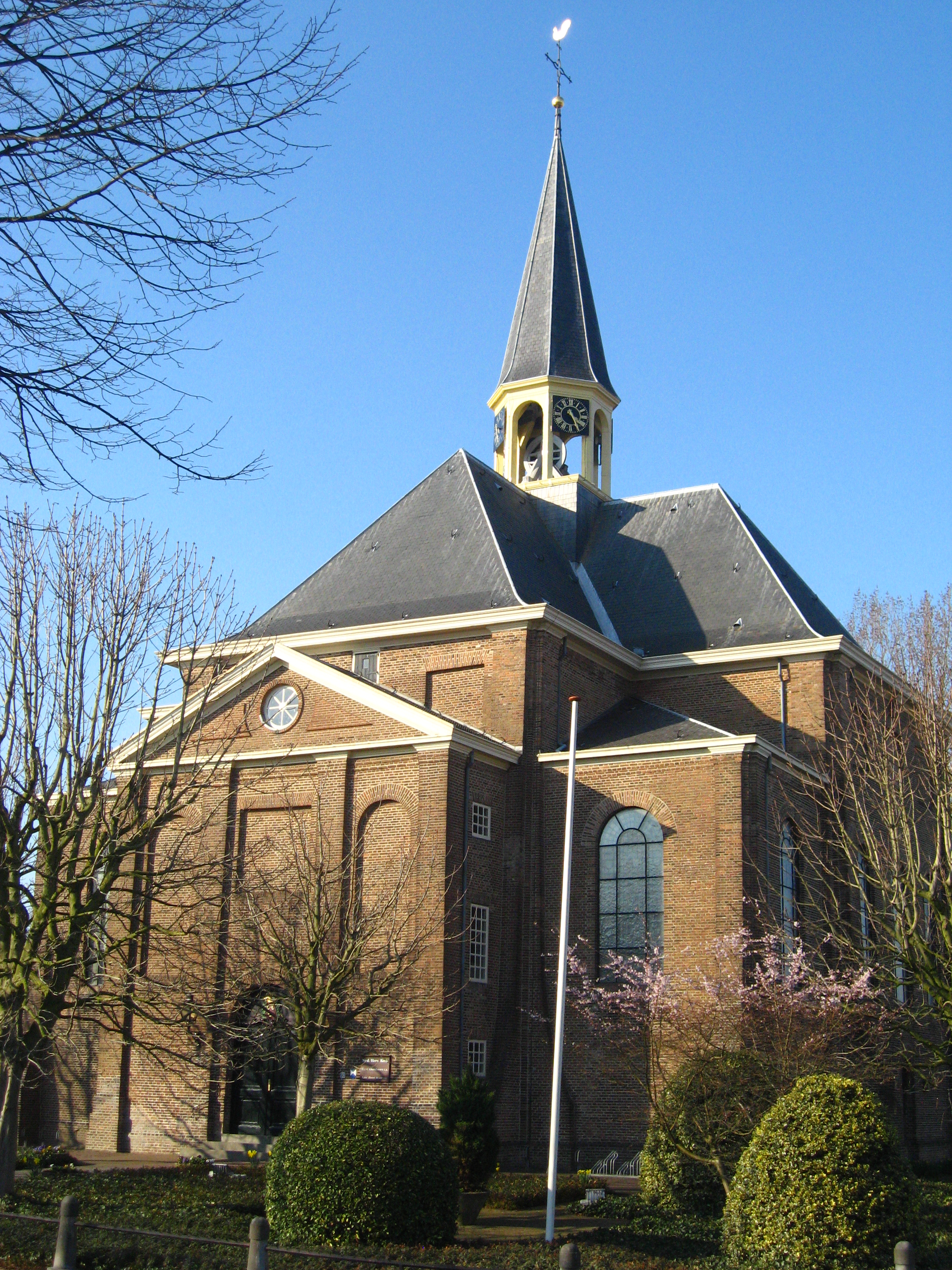
Oudshoornse Kerk
