= Groenendijk =

Groenendijk is a Dutch toponymic surname meaning "green dike". There are a number of hamlets, neighborhoods and dikes in the Low Countries from which the name may have originated. People with the name include:

- Alfons Groenendijk (born 1964), Dutch football midfielder and manager
- Jan Groenendijk (footballer) (1946–2014), Dutch football forward
- Jan Groenendijk (draughts player) (born 1998), Dutch draughts player
- Jeroen Groenendijk (1949–2023), Dutch logician, linguist and philosopher
- Richard Groenendijk (born 1972), Dutch cabaret artist, actor and voice actor
