= 2026 Belgian Super Cup =

Football competition

Club Brugge	Union Saint-Gilloise
League winners	Cup winners
1	1
- Union Saint-Gilloise won 5–4 on penalties
- Date: 31 July 2026
- Venue: Jan Breydel Stadium, Bruges
- Referee: Lawrence Visser
- Attendance: 22,650

The 2026 Belgian Super Cup was a football match played on 31 July 2026 between Club Brugge, the winners of the 2025–26 Belgian Pro League, and Union SG, the winners of the 2025–26 Belgian Cup. The fixture was the same as the two previous editions, with both teams each winning once. Union Saint-Gilloise won on penalties, continuing the trend of the away team winning, which before that had not occurred since Club Brugge won the 2004 Belgian Super Cup at Anderlecht.

== Match ==
=== Details ===
31 July 2026
20:30 CEST

Club Brugge	1–1	Union SG
Tresoldi 49'	Report	Mac Allister 77'
Penalties
Tresoldi (penalty scored); Lemaréchal (penalty scored); Mechele (penalty scored); Tsawa (penalty missed); Vermant (penalty scored)	4–5	(penalty scored) David; (penalty scored) Khalaily; (penalty scored) Zeneli; (penalty scored) Zorgane; (penalty scored) Mofokeng

Jan Breydel Stadium, Brugge
Attendance: 22,650
Referee: Lawrence Visser

Club Brugge	Union SG

GK	1	(Switzerland) Yann Sommer
RB	64	(Belgium) Kyriani Sabbe
CB	44	(Belgium) Brandon Mechele
CB	58	(Belgium) Jorne Spileers
LB	65	(Belgium) Joaquin Seys		(substituted off) 69'
MF	11	(Belgium) Cisse Sandra		(substituted off) 88'
MF	10	(Norway) Hugo Vetlesen		(substituted off) 88'
MF	20	(Belgium) Hans Vanaken		(substituted off) 73'
RW	9	(Portugal) Carlos Forbs	(yellow card) 39'
CF	7	(Germany) Nicolò Tresoldi	(yellow card) 52'
LW	67	(Senegal) Mamadou Diakhon		(substituted off) 73'
Substitutes:
GK	81	(Belgium) Argus Vanden Driessche
MF	16	(Switzerland) Cheveyo Tsawa		(substituted on) 88'
CF	17	(Belgium) Romeo Vermant		(substituted on) 73'
DF	41	(Belgium) Hugo Siquet		(substituted on) 69'
MF	80	(France) Félix Lemaréchal		(substituted on) 73'
MF	85	(Slovenia) Tian Nai Koren		(substituted on) 88'
DF	14	(Netherlands) Bjorn Meijer
DF	54	(France) Samba Coulibaly
MF	62	(Belgium) Lynnt Audoor
FW	77	(Switzerland) Andrej Vasovic
Manager:
(Croatia) Ivan Leko

GK	1	(Belgium) Vic Chambaere
CB	5	(Argentina) Kevin Mac Allister	(yellow card) 64'
CB	29	(Senegal) Massiré Sylla
CB	26	(England) Ross Sykes
CB	27	(Belgium) Louis Patris		(substituted off) 61'
MF	8	(Algeria) Adem Zorgane
MF	28	(Romania) Darius Olaru		(substituted off) 71'
MF	6	(Belgium) Kamiel Van de Perre
MF	11	(Brazil) Guilherme Smith		(substituted off) 71'
CF	30	(Austria) Raul Florucz		(substituted off) 61'
CF	7	(Ghana) Mohammed Fuseini		(substituted off) 78'
Substitutes:
GK	18	(Georgia (country)) Giorgi Kavlashvili
FW	12	(Canada) Promise David		(substituted on) 78'
FW	22	(Senegal) Ousseynou Niang		(substituted on) 71'
MF	23	(Sweden) Besfort Zeneli		(substituted on) 71'
MF	25	(Israel) Anan Khalaily		(substituted on) 61'
FW	38	(South Africa) Relebohile Mofokeng		(substituted on) 61'
FW	9	(Germany) Mateo Biondic
MF	17	(Belgium) Rob Schoofs
DF	48	(Belgium) Fedde Leysen
DF	55	(Japan) Nikki Havenaar
MF	80	(Czech Republic) Ondřej Kričfaluši
Manager:
(Belgium) David Hubert

== See also ==
- 2025–26 Belgian Pro League
- 2025–26 Belgian Cup
