= 2026–27 Royale Union Saint-Gilloise season =

Royale Union Saint-Gilloise
2026–27 season
- Chairman: Alex Muzio
- Manager: David Hubert
- Stadium: Joseph Marien Stadium
- Belgian Pro League: 1st
- Belgian Cup: Eighth round
- Belgian Super Cup: Winners
- UEFA Champions League: Third qualifying round
- UEFA Europa League: League phase (4th)
- Top goalscorer: League: Raul Florucz (5); All: Raul Florucz (9)
- Biggest win: 5–0 v Lommel
- Biggest defeat: 2–3 (a.e.t.) v Bodø/Glimt
Home colours	Away colours	Third colours
- All statistics correct as of 8 November 2026.

The 2026–27 season is Royale Union Saint-Gilloise's 129th season in existence and sixth consecutive in the Belgian Pro League. In addition to the domestic league, they will participate in this season's editions of the Belgian Cup, entering as the defending champions, and the Belgian Super Cup. Having finished second in the league last season, they competed in the UEFA Champions League qualifying rounds; following their loss in the third qualifying round, they will participate in the UEFA Europa League league phase.

== Players ==
=== First-team squad ===
As of 5 November 2026

No.	Player	Position(s)	Nationality	Place of birth	Date of birth (age)	Signed from	Date signed	Fee	Contract end
Goalkeepers
1	Vic Chambaere	GK	(Belgium)	Roeselare	10 January 2003 (age 23)	(Belgium) Genk	1 July 2024	Free transfer	30 June 2028
12	Hervé Koffi	GK	(Burkina Faso)	Bobo-Dioulasso	16 October 1996 (age 30)	(France) Lens	1 August 2026	Loan	30 June 2027
71	Keo Boets	GK	(Belgium)	Unknown	21 December 2003 (age 22)	(Belgium) Dessel Sport	23 July 2026	Free transfer	30 June 2027
Defenders
4	Nohim Chibani	DF	(Algeria)	Unknown	6 October 2003 (age 23)	(France) QRM	1 July 2026	Free transfer	30 June 2030
5	Kevin Mac Allister	DF	(Argentina)	Buenos Aires	7 November 1997 (age 29)	(Argentina) Argentinos Juniors	12 July 2023	€1,500,000	30 June 2031
21	Denzel De Roeve	DF	(Belgium)	Ninove	August 10, 2004 (age 22)	(Norway) Brann	29 August 2026	Undisclosed	30 June 2031
26	Ross Sykes	DF	(England)	Burnley	26 March 1999 (age 27)	(England) Accrington	1 July 2022	€280,000	30 June 2027
27	Louis Patris	DF	(Belgium)	Gembloux	7 June 2001 (age 25)	(Belgium) STVV	1 September 2025	Undisclosed	30 June 2028
29	Massiré Sylla	DF	(Senegal)	Dakar	7 January 2005 (age 21)	(Norway) Lyn	13 January 2026	Undisclosed	30 June 2031
55	Nikki Havenaar	DF	(Japan)	Nagoya	16 February 1995 (age 31)	(Austria) SV Ried	1 July 2026	Undisclosed	30 June 2029
Midfielders
6	Kamiel Van de Perre	MF	(Belgium)	Turnhout	12 February 2004 (age 22)	(Belgium) Jong Genk	1 July 2024	Free transfer	30 June 2030
8	Adem Zorgane	MF	(Algeria)	Sétif	6 January 2000 (age 26)	(Belgium) Charleroi	12 July 2025	Undisclosed	30 June 2031
10	Anouar Ait El Hadj	MF	(Belgium)	Molenbeek	20 April 2002 (age 24)	(Belgium) Genk	13 July 2024	€1,500,000	30 June 2028
14	Ivan Pavlić	MF	(Netherlands)	Rotterdam	10 November 2001 (age 24)	(Portugal) Paços de Ferreira	3 September 2025	Undisclosed	30 June 2029
17	Rob Schoofs	MF	(Belgium)	Sint-Truiden	23 March 1994 (age 32)	(Belgium) KV Mechelen	1 September 2025	Undisclosed	30 June 2028
23	Besfort Zeneli	MF	(Sweden)	Falun	21 November 2002 (age 23)	(Sweden) Elfsborg	13 January 2026	Undisclosed	30 June 2030
28	Darius Olaru	MF	(Romania)	Mediaș	3 March 1998 (age 28)	(Romania) FCSB	1 July 2026	Undisclosed	30 June 2030
38	Relebohile Mofokeng	MF	(South Africa)	Sharpeville	23 October 2004 (age 22)	(South Africa) Orlando Pirates	2 July 2026	Undisclosed	30 June 2030
80	Ondřej Kričfaluši	MF	(Czech Republic)	Unknown	9 March 2004 (age 22)	(Czech Republic) Baník Ostrava	1 July 2026	Undisclosed	30 June 2030
Forwards
9	Mateo Biondic	FW	(Germany)	Lemgo	24 July 2003 (age 23)	(Germany) Eintracht Trier	3 January 2026	Undisclosed	30 June 2030
11	Guilherme Smith	FW	(Brazil)	Unknown	11 June 2003 (age 23)	(Estonia) Kalju	12 August 2025	Undisclosed	30 June 2030
13	Kevin Rodríguez	FW	(Ecuador)	Ibarra	4 March 2000 (age 26)	(Ecuador) Independiente	1 September 2023	€4,500,000	30 June 2029
20	Marc Giger	FW	(Switzerland)	Zurich	27 March 2004 (age 22)	(Switzerland) Schaffhausen	31 January 2025	Undisclosed	30 June 2029
30	Raul Florucz	FW	(Austria)	Vienna	10 June 2001 (age 25)	(Slovenia) NK Olimpija	15 July 2025	Undisclosed	30 June 2029
-	Ilan Hurtevent	FW	(Belgium)	Unknown	25 May 2005 (age 21)	(Belgium) KV Kortrijk	1 July 2026	Undisclosed	30 June 2030
-	Dylan Aquino	FW	(Argentina)	Quilmes	4 June 2005 (age 21)	(Argentina) Club Atlético Lanús	2 September 2026	Undisclosed	30 June 2030
Out On Loan
3	Mamadou Barry	DF	(Senegal)	Unknown	20 March 2005 (age 21)	(Norway) Tromsø	27 January 2025	Undisclosed	30 June 2029
12	Promise David	FW	(Canada)	Brampton	3 July 2001 (age 25)	(Estonia) Kalju	2 July 2024	Unknown	30 June 2027
48	Fedde Leysen	DF	(Belgium)	Geel	9 July 2003 (age 23)	(Netherlands) Jong PSV	1 July 2023	Free transfer	30 June 2029
77	Mohammed Fuseini	FW	(Ghana)	Accra	16 May 2002 (age 24)	(Austria) Sturm Graz	2 July 2024	Unknown	30 June 2027

== Transfers ==
=== In ===
Date	Position	Nationality	Player	From	Fee	Ref.
First team
1 July 2026	Forward	(Equatorial Guinea)	Cristian Makaté	(Belgium) La Louvière	Return from loan	
1 July 2026 (Note: The transfer was announced on 26 May 2026, and would become official on July 1 once the transfer window had opened.)	Defender	(Japan)	Nikki Havenaar	(Austria) SV Ried	Undisclosed	
1 July 2026 (Note: The transfer was announced on 8 June 2026, and would become official on July 1 once Chibanis' contract at QRM has expired.)	Defender	(Algeria)	Nohim Chibani	(France) QRM	Free transfer	
1 July 2026 (Note: The transfer was announced on 10 June 2026, and would become official on July 1 once the transfer window had opened.)	Defender	(Czech Republic)	Ondřej Kričfaluši	(Czech Republic) Baník Ostrava	Undisclosed	
1 July 2026 (Note: The transfer was announced on 15 June 2026, and would become official on July 1 once the transfer window had opened.)	Forward	(Belgium)	Ilan Hurtevent	(Belgium) KV Kortrijk	Undisclosed	
1 July 2026 (Note: The transfer was announced on 16 June 2026, and would become official on July 1 once the transfer window had opened.)	Midfielder	(Romania)	Darius Olaru	(Romania) FCSB	Undisclosed	
2 July 2026	Midfielder	(South Africa)	Relebohile Mofokeng	(South Africa) Orlando Pirates	Undisclosed	
23 July 2026	Goalkeeper	(Belgium)	Keo Boets	(Belgium) Dessel Sport	Free transfer	
29 August 2026	Defender	(Belgium)	Denzel De Roeve	(Norway) Brann	Undisclosed	
2 September 2026	Forward	(Argentina)	Dylan Aquino	(Argentina) Lanús	Undisclosed	
U23 Team
8 August 2026	Midfielder	(Denmark)	Bertram Kvist	(Denmark) Næstved Boldklub	Undisclosed	

=== Out ===
Date	Position	Nationality	Player	To	Fee	Ref.
28 July 2026	Goalkeeper	(Netherlands)	Kjell Scherpen	(England) Ipswich Town	Undisclosed (Note: Transfer fee undisclosed but reported to be €10,000,000 with €3,000,000 in potential bonuses.)	
12 August 2026	Forward	(Equatorial Guinea)	Cristian Makaté	(Belgium) Lierse	Undisclosed	
15 August 2026	Midfielder	(Israel)	Anan Khalaili	(England) Crystal Palace	Undisclosed (Note: Transfer fee undisclosed but reported to be €21,000,000.)	
3 September 2026	Midfielder	(Senegal)	Ousseynou Niang	(Belgium) Zulte Waregem	Undisclosed	

=== Loaned In ===
Date	Position	Nationality	Player	From	Fee	Ref.
1 August 2026	Goalkeeper	(Burkina Faso)	Hervé Koffi	(France) Lens	Undisclosed (Note: Includes option to buy.)	

=== Loaned Out ===
Date	Position	Nationality	Player	To	Ref.
2 August 2026	Defender	(Senegal)	Mamadou Barry	(Saudi Arabia) Al-Shabab (Note: Includes option to buy.)	
18 August 2026	Forward	(Canada)	Promise David	(England) Brighton (Note: Includes conditional obligation option to buy. The deal, if made permanent next summer, is reported to be a four-year contract with a transfer fee of €26,000,000 plus add-ons.)	
21 August 2026	Defender	(Belgium)	Fedde Leysen	(Italy) Sassuolo (Note: Includes conditional obligation option to buy.)	
1 September 2026	Forward	(Ghana)	Mohammed Fuseini	(England) Derby County	

=== Released / Out of Contract ===
Date	Pos.	Player	Subsequent club	Join date	Ref.
30 June 2026	DF	(England) Christian Burgess	(Belgium) Gent	1 July 2026	
30 June 2026	GK	(Belgium) Jens Teunckens	Free agent		
30 June 2026	DF	(Belgium) Guillaume François	Retired		

== New contracts ==
=== First team ===
Date	Pos.	Player	Contract length	Ref.
1 July 2026	FW	Guilherme Smith	4 years (Note: Extended contract by one year with an option for another year)	
19 August 2026	MF	Kamiel Van de Perre	4 years (Note: Extended contract by one year with an option for another year)	
28 August 2026	DF	Kevin Mac Allister	5 years (Note: Option triggered to extend previous contract through to the end of 2027, then signed a new contract through to 2031.)	
28 August 2026	FW	Kevin Rodríguez	3 years (Note: Extended contract by two years.)	
31 October 2026	MF	Adem Zorgane	5 years (Note: Extended contract by two years.)	
5 November 2026	DF	Massiré Sylla	5 years (Note: Extended contract by one year.)	

== Pre-season and friendlies ==
Win Draw Loss Fixtures

30 June 2026	Diegem Sport	0–7	Union Saint-Gilloise	Diegem
18:30 CEST			3' Sylla; 13' Khalaili; 36' Pavlić; 39' Smith; 52' Biondic; 75' Patris; 88' Zorgane	Stadium: Gemeentelijk Sportstadion Diegem

1 July 2026	Union Saint-Gilloise	4–0	FCSB	Nijlen
18:00 CEST	Biondic 30'; Florucz 42'; Sylla 83'; Fuseini 85'			Stadium: KFC Nijlen Ground

11 July 2026	Union Saint-Gilloise	2–1	Aarhus GF	Tubize
14:00 CEST	Hurtevent 30'; Guilherme Smith 113'		68' Tingager	Attendance: 0
Note: Behind closed doors.

18 July 2026	PSV	3–3	Union Saint-Gilloise
12:30	Flamingo 29'; Man 32'; Mijnans 45'		36', 45+13' Fuseini; 45+27' Guilherme Smith	Attendance: 0
Note: Behind closed doors.

18 July 2026	PSV	4–0	Union Saint-Gilloise
12:30	Van den Berg 8'; Bouhamdi 31'; Bouhoudane 38'; Jones 45+25'			Attendance: 0
Note: Behind closed doors.

24 July 2026	Union Saint-Gilloise	4–0	Patro Eisden
12:30	Schoofs 19'; Pavlić 34'; Fuseini 58'; Havenaar 76'			Attendance: 0
Note: Behind closed doors.

25 July 2026	Union Saint-Gilloise	2–1	Lille
17:00	Patris 25'; Zeneli 74'		Perrin 60'	Attendance: 0

== Competitions ==
=== Overall record ===
Competition	First match	Last match	Starting round	Final position	Record							
Competition	First match	Last match	Starting round	Final position	Pld	W	D	L	GF	GA	GD	Win %
Belgian Pro League	8 August 2026		Matchday 1		11	9	2	0	30	7	+23	81.82
Belgian Super Cup	31 July 2026		Final	Winners	1	0	1	0	1	1	+0	0.00
Belgian Cup			Seventh round		1	1	0	0	3	0	+3	100.00
UEFA Champions League	4 August 2026	11 August 2026	Third qualifying round	Third qualifying round	2	0	1	1	5	6	−1	0.00
UEFA Europa League	17 September 2026		League phase		4	3	1	0	10	2	+8	75.00
Total					19	13	5	1	49	16	+33	68.42

Last updated: 8 November 2026
Source: Competitions

=== Belgian Pro League ===
==== League table ====
Pos	Team	Pld	W	D	L	GF	GA	GD	Pts	Qualification or relegation
1	Club Brugge	10	9	0	1	26	8	+18	27	Qualification for the Champions League league phase
2	Charleroi	11	9	0	2	26	13	+13	27	Qualification for the Champions League third qualifying round
3	Union SG	10	8	2	0	29	7	+22	26	Qualification for the Europa League second qualifying round
4	Gent	10	8	1	1	19	6	+13	25	Qualification for the Conference League second qualifying round
5	Anderlecht	10	6	1	3	13	11	+2	19	

Updated to match(es) played on 7 November 2026. Source: Jupiler Pro League (in Dutch)
Rules for classification: 1) Points; 2) Matches won; 3) Goal difference; 4) Goals scored; 5) Away matches won; 6) Away goal difference; 7) Away goals scored; 8) Play-off.

==== Results summary ====
Overall								Home						Away					
Pld	W	D	L	GF	GA	GD	Pts	W	D	L	GF	GA	GD	W	D	L	GF	GA	GD
11	9	2	0	30	7	+23	29	4	2	0	15	3	+12	5	0	0	15	4	+11

Last updated: 8 November 2026.
Source: Competitions

==== Results by round ====
Round	1	2	3	4	5	6	7	8	9	10	11	12	13	14	15
Ground	A	H	H (Note: Union Saint-Gilloise were a game behind some of the teams ahead of them at the time.)	A	A	H	A	H	H	A	H	A	H	A	H
Result	W	D	W	W	W	W	W	D	W	W	W				
Position	1	5	6	3	2	1	1	4	3	2	1				
Points	3	4	7	10	13	16	19	20	23	26	29				

Updated to match(es) played on 8 November 2026. Source:
A = Away; H = Home; W = Win; D = Draw; L = Loss

==== Matches ====
Win Draw Loss Fixtures

8 August 2026 1	Westerlo	1–5	Union Saint-Gilloise	Westerlo
20:45 CEST	Bassette 13'; Sandra (yellow card) 35'		(yellow card) 25' Mac Allister; 28' David; (yellow card) 33', (goal) 57' Florucz; 64' Mofokeng; 81' Smith; 84' Olaru	Stadium: Het Kuipje; Attendance: 5,250; Referee: Bert Put

15 August 2026 2	Union Saint-Gilloise	0–0	Zulte Waregem	Brussels
16:00 CEST	Mac Allister (yellow card) 30'; Leysen (yellow card) 68'			Stadium: Joseph Marien Stadium; Referee: Lothar D’Hondt

30 August 2026 4	Union Saint-Gilloise	3–0	Anderlecht	Brussels
18:30 CEST	Sylla (yellow card) 29'; Zeneli 38'; Biondic 45'; Mac Allister (yellow card) 78'; Florucz 81'	Report	(yellow card) HT Biancone; (yellow card) 62' Kana	Stadium: Joseph Marien Stadium; Referee: Lawrence Visser

2 September 2026 3	STVV	0–3	Union Saint-Gilloise	Sint-Truiden
20:30 CEST	Sissako (yellow card) 47'; Vanwesemael (yellow card) 49'; Ishiwatari (yellow card) 54'	Report	(yellow card) 21', (goal) 55' Mac Allister; 23' Patris; (yellow card) 61' Van de Perre; 63' Mofokeng	Stadium: Stayen; Referee: Nathan Verboomen
Note: Match originally scheduled for Matchweek 3, but moved to accommodate Union's participation in the UEFA Champions League qualifying rounds.

5 September 2026 5	Sporting Charleroi	2–3	Union Saint-Gilloise	Charleroi
16:00 CEST	Nzita (yellow card) 9'; Mbema 27'; Pflücke 41'	Report	(yellow card) 7' Kričfaluši; 12' (o.g.) Koné; 44' Zorgane; (yellow card) 45+2' Patris; 49' Van de Perre	Stadium: Stade du Pays de Charleroi; Referee: Nicolas Laforge

12 September 2026 6	Union Saint-Gilloise	5–0	Lommel SK	Brussels
20:45 CEST	Zeneli 4'; Mofokeng 7'; Sylla (yellow card) 42'; Patris (yellow card) 52'; Hurtevent 65'; Florucz 88', 90+2'	Report		Stadium: Joseph Marien Stadium; Referee: Yusuke Araki

20 September 2026 7	Antwerp	0–2	Union Saint-Gilloise	Antwerp
13:30 CEST	Frey (yellow card) 18'; Vermeeren (yellow card) 25'; Deuff (yellow card) 67' (yellow-red card) 70'; Porozo (yellow card) 75'	Report	(yellow card) 18' Zorgane; 51' Biondic; (yellow card) 75' Koffi; 78' De Roeve	Stadium: Bosuilstadion; Referee: Jan Boterberg

11 October 2026 8	Union Saint-Gilloise	1–1	OH Leuven	Brussels
16:00 CEST	Opoku 66' (o.g.); Patris (red card) 90+1'	Report	(yellow card) 6' Balikwisha; 17' Opoku; (yellow card) 42' Lawrence; (yellow card) 43' Gil	Stadium: Joseph Marien Stadium; Referee: Nathan Verboomen

25 October 2026 9	Union Saint-Gilloise	5–2	Cercle Brugge	Brussels
19:15 CET	Chibani (yellow card) 40'; Florucz 49'; Sylla 62'; Kakou 74' (o.g.); Mofokeng 80'; Rodríguez 90'		24' (pen.), (yellow card) 90+2' Ngoura; 48' (o.g.) Sylla; (yellow card) 57' Konaté; (red card) 64' Vanzeir; (yellow card) 76' Van der Bruggen	Stadium: Joseph Marien Stadium

31 October 2026 10	SK Beveren	1–2	Union Saint-Gilloise	Beveren
20:45 CET	Boone (yellow card) 39'; Verschueren 60'		44' Patris; (red card) 53' Aquino; 55' Smith; (yellow card) 69' Sylla	Stadium: Freethiel Stadion

8 November 2026 11	Union Saint-Gilloise	1–0	Genk	Brussels
18:30 CET	Sylla (yellow card) 63'; Sykes 76'	Report	(yellow card) 89' Medina	Stadium: Joseph Marien Stadium; Referee: Bram Van Driessche

22 November 2026 12	Kortrijk	v	Union Saint-Gilloise	Kortrijk
16:00 CET				Stadium: Guldensporen Stadion

29 November 2026 13	Union Saint-Gilloise	v	Gent	Brussels
19:15 CET				Stadium: Joseph Marien Stadium

13 December 2026 14	Mechelen	v	Union Saint-Gilloise	Mechelen
18:30 CET				Stadium: Achter de Kazerne

20 December 2026 15	Union Saint-Gilloise	v	Club Brugge	Brussels
18:30 CET				Stadium: Joseph Marien Stadium

26 December 2026 16	Standard Liege	v	Union Saint-Gilloise	Liège
20:45 CET				Stadium: Stade Maurice Dufrasne

16 January 2027 17	Union Saint-Gilloise	v	RAAL La Louviere	Brussels
18:15 CET				Stadium: Joseph Marien Stadium

23 January 2027 18	Union Saint-Gilloise	v	SK Beveren	Brussels
TBD CET				Stadium: Joseph Marien Stadium

30 January 2027 19	Zulte Waregem	v	Union Saint-Gilloise	Waregem
TBD CET				Stadium: Elindus Arena

6 February 2027 20	Union Saint-Gilloise	v	STVV	Brussels
TBD CET				Stadium: Joseph Marien Stadium

13 February 2027 21	Lommel SK	v	Union Saint-Gilloise	Lommel
TBD CET				Stadium: Soevereinstadion

20 February 2027 22	Union Saint-Gilloise	v	Westerlo	Brussels
TBD CET				Stadium: Joseph Marien Stadium

27 February 2027 23	Genk	v	Union Saint-Gilloise	Genk
TBD CET				Stadium: Cegeka Arena

6 March 2027 24	Union Saint-Gilloise	v	Standard Liege	Brussels
TBD CET				Stadium: Joseph Marien Stadium

13 March 2027 25	Cercle Brugge	v	Union Saint-Gilloise	Bruges
TBD CET				Stadium: Jan Breydel Stadium

20 March 2027 26	OH Leuven	v	Union Saint-Gilloise	Leuven
TBD CET				Stadium: Den Dreef

2 April 2027 27	Union Saint-Gilloise	v	Mechelen	Brussels
TBD CEST				Stadium: Joseph Marien Stadium

9 April 2027 28	RAAL La Louviere	v	Union Saint-Gilloise	La Louvière
TBD CEST				Stadium: Easi Arena

16 April 2027 29	Union Saint-Gilloise	v	Antwerp	Brussels
TBD CEST				Stadium: Joseph Marien Stadium

23 April 2027 30	Club Brugge	v	Union Saint-Gilloise	Bruges
TBD CEST				Stadium: Jan Breydel Stadium

30 April 2027 31	Union Saint-Gilloise	v	Kortrijk	Brussels
TBD CEST				Stadium: Joseph Marien Stadium

7 May 2027 32	Anderlecht	v	Union Saint-Gilloise	Anderlecht
TBD CEST				Stadium: Lotto Park

14 May 2027 33	Gent	v	Union Saint-Gilloise	Ghent
TBD CEST				Stadium: Planet Group Arena

21 May 2027 34	Union Saint-Gilloise	v	Sporting Charleroi	Brussels
TBD CEST				Stadium: Joseph Marien Stadium

=== Belgian Cup ===
Win Draw Loss Fixtures

18 October 2026 Seventh round	Union Saint-Gilloise	3–0	Nijlen	Brussels
13:30 CEST	Aquino (yellow card) 35'; Florucz 69'; Zeneli 80'; Van de Perre 83'	Report	(yellow card) 1' Van Steenwinkel	Stadium: Joseph Marien Stadium

TBD December 2026 Eighth round	Union Saint-Gilloise	v	Westerlo	Brussels
--:-- CEST				Stadium: Joseph Marien Stadium

=== Belgian Super Cup ===
Win Draw Loss Fixtures

31 July 2026 Final	Club Brugge	1–1 (4–5 p)	Union Saint-Gilloise	Bruges
20:30 CEST	Forbs (yellow card) 39'; Tresoldi 49', (yellow card) 52'	Report	(yellow card) 64', (goal) 77' Mac Allister	Stadium: Jan Breydel Stadium; Attendance: 22,650; Referee: Lawrence Visser
	Penalties
	Tresoldi (penalty scored); Félix (penalty scored); Mechele (penalty scored); Tsawa (penalty missed); Vermant (penalty scored)		(penalty scored) Promise; (penalty scored) Khalaili; (penalty scored) Zeneli; (penalty scored) Zorgane; (penalty scored) Mofokeng

=== UEFA Champions League ===
==== Qualifying rounds ====
Win Draw Loss Fixtures

Due to Union's home ground the Joseph Marien Stadium, not meeting UEFA requirements for participation in the Champions League, Union Saint-Gilloise will play their home games in the Champions League qualifying rounds at Batimont Solar Park in Ostend, which is the home ground of Division 2 side KV Diksmuide-Oostende. The club will confirm their home venue for the league phase of the European competition when it is known whether they will be playing the Champions League or the Europa League.

4 August 2026 Third qualifying round First Leg	Union Saint-Gillosie (Belgium)	3–3	(Norway) Bodø/Glimt	Ostend
20:00	Sylla (yellow card) 18'; Florucz 25', 45+5'; Mac Allister (yellow card) 27'; Khalaili (yellow card) 32'; Smith (yellow card) 72'; David 88'; Zeneli (yellow card) 90'	Report	20' Berg; 29' (pen.) Blomberg; (yellow card) 41' Gundersen; (yellow card) 43' Fet; 90' Bjørtuft	Stadium: Batimont Solar Park; Attendance: 4,827; Referee: (Bosnia and Herzegovina) Irfan Peljto

11 August 2026 Third qualifying round Second Leg	Bodø/Glimt (Norway)	3–2 (a.e.t.) (6–5 agg.)	(Belgium) Union Saint-Gilloise	Bodø
	Auklend (yellow card) 16'; Bomberg 51'; Hauge 76'; Aleesami (yellow card) 92'; Helmersen 117'	Report	62', (yellow card) 90+6' Smith; (yellow card) 81' (yellow-red card) 90+6' Van de Perre; 88' Fuseini; (yellow card) 118' Mac Allister; (red card) FT Florucz; (red card) FT Zorgane	Stadium: Aspmyra Stadion; Attendance: 7,777; Referee: (Romania) István Kovács

=== UEFA Europa League ===
Because the Joseph Marien Stadium does not meet UEFA requirements, Union Saint-Gilloise will play three of their Europa League home games at Den Dreef, the home of fellow Pro League side OH Leuven. However, Leuven mayor Mohamed Ridouani prohibited Union from hosting Israeli club Hapoel Be'er Sheva at the stadium, citing security concerns and potential protests related to the Gaza war. On September 25, Union confirmed that the match would be behind closed doors at Düsseldorf Arena in Düsseldorf, Germany which is home of 3. Liga club Fortuna Düsseldorf.

==== League phase ====
Pos	Team	Pld	W	D	L	GF	GA	GD	Pts	Qualification
2	(England) Bournemouth	4	4	0	0	11	2	+9	12	Advance to round of 16 (seeded)
3	(Hungary) Ferencváros	4	4	0	0	11	3	+8	12	Advance to round of 16 (seeded)
4	(Belgium) Union Saint-Gilloise	4	3	1	0	10	2	+8	10	Advance to round of 16 (seeded)
5	(Italy) Juventus	4	3	1	0	11	4	+7	10	Advance to round of 16 (seeded)
6	(Greece) Olympiacos	4	3	1	0	4	1	+3	10	Advance to round of 16 (seeded)

Updated to match(es) played on 5 November 2026. Source: UEFA
Rules for classification: League phase tiebreakers

===== Results summary =====
Overall								Home						Away					
Pld	W	D	L	GF	GA	GD	Pts	W	D	L	GF	GA	GD	W	D	L	GF	GA	GD
4	3	1	0	10	2	+8	10	1	1	0	5	1	+4	2	0	0	5	1	+4

Last updated: 5 November 2026.
Source: Competitions

===== Results by round =====
Round	1	2	3	4	5	6	7	8
Ground	A	H	H	A	H	A	A	H
Result	W	D	W	W				
Position	5	12	6	4				
Points	3	4	7	10				

Updated to match(es) played on 5 November 2026. Source:
A = Away; H = Home; W = Win; D = Draw; L = Loss

===== Matches =====
Win Draw Loss Fixtures

The draw for the league phase was made on 28 August 2026.

17 September 2026 1	Viktoria Plzeň (Czech Republic)	0–3	(Belgium) Union Saint-Gilloise	Plzeň
21:00 CEST	Hrošovský (yellow card) 45'; Pirgic (yellow card) 60'	Report	(yellow card) 16', (goal) 59' Kričfaluši; 18' Mofokeng; (yellow card) 42', (goal) 43' Biondic	Stadium: Doosan Arena; Referee: (Israel) Yigal Frid

15 October 2026 2	Union Saint-Gilloise (Belgium)	1–1	(Spain) Real Sociedad	Leuven
18:45 CEST	Chibani (yellow card) 58'; Smith (yellow card) 73'; Keita 88'	Report	46' Turrientes; (yellow card) 74' Sarr	Stadium: Den Dreef; Referee: Goga Kikacheishvili (Georgia)

22 October 2026 3	Union Saint-Gilloise (Belgium)	4–0	(Israel) Hapoel Be'er Sheva	Düsseldorf (Germany)
18:45 CEST	Chibani (yellow card) 20'; Florucz 45+1' (pen.); Smith 61', 81'; Van de Perre (yellow card) 72'; Aquino 77'	Report	(yellow card) 25' Yehoshuha; (yellow card) 45+6' Ahmad; (yellow card) 58' Vítor	Stadium: Düsseldorf Arena; Referee: (Ukraine) Mykola Balakin
Note: Game to be played behind closed doors and in a neutral venue.

5 November 2026 4	Celta (Spain)	1–2	(Belgium) Union Saint-Gilloise	Vigo
21:00 CET	Durán 12', (yellow card) 90+5'	Report	35', 49' Zeneli; (yellow card) 71' Smith	Stadium: Balaídos Stadium; Referee: (Azerbaijan) Aliyar Aghayev

26 November 2026 5	Union Saint-Gilloise (Belgium)	v	(Poland) Lech Poznań	Leuven
18:45 CET				Stadium: Den Dreef

10 December 2026 6	Lyon (France)	v	(Belgium) Union Saint-Gilloise	Décines-Charpieu
21:00 CET				Stadium: Parc Olympique Lyonnais

21 January 2027 7	Beşiktaş (Turkey)	v	(Belgium) Union Saint-Gilloise	Beşiktaş
18:45 CET				Stadium: Beşiktaş Stadium

28 January 2027 8	Union Saint-Gilloise (Belgium)	v	(Scotland) Celtic	Leuven
21:00 CET				Stadium: Den Dreef

== Statistics ==
=== Appearances, goals and discipline ===
As of 8 November 2026

Players with no appearances are not included; italics indicate loaned in player

No.	Pos.	Player	Belgian Pro League		Belgian Cup		Belgian Super Cup		Champions League		Europa League		Total		Discipline		
No.	Pos.	Player	Apps	Goals	Apps	Goals	Apps	Goals	Apps	Goals	Apps	Goals	Apps	Goals	Yellow card	(yellow card) (yellow-red card)	Red card
1	GK	(Belgium) Vic Chambaere	1	0	1	0	1	0	2	0	0	0	5	0	0	0	0
4	DF	(France) Nohim Chibani	3(1)	0	1	0	0	0	0	0	3(1)	0	9	0	3	0	0
5	DF	(Argentina) Kevin Mac Allister	6	1	0	0	1	1	2	0	0	0	9	2	7	0	0
6	MF	(Belgium) Kamiel Van de Perre	11	1	1	1	1	0	2	0	3	0	18	2	3	1	0
8	MF	(Algeria) Adem Zorgane	6(3)	1	0	0	1	0	1	0	1	0	12	1	1	0	1
9	FW	(Germany) Mateo Biondic	6(1)	2	0(1)	0	0	0	0(1)	0	3	1	12	3	1	0	0
10	MF	(Belgium) Anouar Ait El Hadj	0(1)	0	1	0	0	0	0	0	0	0	2	0	0	0	0
11	FW	(Brazil) Guilherme Smith	10(1)	2	0	0	1	0	2	1	4	2	18	5	3	0	0
12	GK	(Burkina Faso) Hervé Koffi	10	0	0	0	0	0	0	0	4	0	14	0	1	0	0
13	FW	(Ecuador) Kevin Rodríguez	3(2)	1	0	0	0	0	0(1)	0	1(2)	0	9	1	0	0	0
14	MF	(Netherlands) Ivan Pavlic	0(1)	0	1	0	0	0	0	0	0	0	2	0	0	0	0
17	MF	(Belgium) Rob Schoofs	2(5)	0	0	0	0	0	1(1)	0	1	0	10	0	0	0	0
20	FW	(Argentina) Dylan Aquino	1(2)	0	1	0	0	0	0	0	0(4)	1	8	1	1	0	1
21	DF	(Belgium) Denzel De Roeve	0(9)	1	1	0	0	0	0	0	0(4)	0	14	1	0	0	0
23	MF	(Sweden) Besfort Zeneli	11	2	0(1)	1	0(1)	0	1(1)	0	4	2	19	5	1	0	0
25	MF	(Belgium) Ilan Hurtevant	0(3)	1	0	0	0	0	0	0	0(2)	0	5	1	0	0	0
26	DF	(England) Ross Sykes	1(2)	1	0	0	1	0	1	0	0(1)	0	6	1	0	0	0
27	DF	(Belgium) Louis Patris	11	2	0(1)	0	1	0	1	0	4	0	18	2	2	0	1
28	MF	(Romania) Darius Olaru	1(4)	1	0	0	1	0	2	0	3(1)	0	12	1	0	0	0
29	DF	(Senegal) Massiré Sylla	10	1	1	0	1	0	2	0	4	0	18	1	5	0	0
30	FW	(Austria) Raul Florucz	6(5)	5	1	1	1	0	1(1)	2	0(1)	1	16	9	1	0	1
32	FW	(Belgium) Sekou Keita	0(1)	0	1	0	0	0	0	0	0(1)	1	3	1	0	0	0
33	DF	(Germany) Dennis Egel	0(1)	0	1	0	0	0	0	0	0	0	2	0	0	0	0
38	MF	(South Africa) Relebohile Mofokeng	6(4)	4	0(1)	0	0(1)	0	0(1)	0	4	1	17	5	1	0	0
43	DF	(Belgium) Daniel Tshilanda	0	0	0	0	0	0	0	0	0(1)	0	1	0	0	0	0
55	DF	(Japan) Nikki Havenaar	6(3)	0	0(1)	0	0	0	1(1)	0	4	0	16	0	0	0	0
80	MF	(Czech Republic) Ondřej Kričfaluši	5(1)	0	0	0	0	0	0	0	1	1	7	1	2	0	0
Players who have made appearances this season but have since departed the club
7	FW	(Ghana) Mohammed Fuseini	1(1)	0	0	0	1	0	1(1)	1	0	0	5	1	0	0	0
12	FW	(Canada) Promise David	1	1	0	0	0(1)	0	1(1)	1	0	0	4	2	0	0	0
22	MF	(Senegal) Ousseynou Niang	1(1)	0	0	0	0(1)	0	0(1)	0	0	0	4	0	0	0	0
25	FW	(Israel) Anan Khalaili	0	0	0	0	0(1)	0	1	0	0	0	2	0	1	0	0
48	DF	(Belgium) Fedde Leysen	2	0	0	0	0	0	0	0	0	0	2	0	1	0	0
