= Havenaar =

Havenaar is a surname. Notable people with the surname include:

- Dido Havenaar (born 1957), Dutch-Japanese footballer
- Mike Havenaar (born 1987), Japanese footballer
- Nikki Havenaar (born 1995), Japanese footballer, son of Dido and brother of Mike
