= 2024 IF Elfsborg season =

IF Elfsborg
2024 season
- Director: Stefan Andreasson
- Manager: Jimmy Thelin (until 3 June 2024) Oscar Hiljemark (since 3 June 2024)
- Stadium: Borås Arena
- 2024 Allsvenskan: 5th
- 2023–24 Svenska Cupen: Group stage
- 2024–25 Svenska Cupen: Pre-season
- 2024–25 UEFA Europa League: League phase
- Top goalscorer: League: Michael Baidoo (10); All: Michael Baidoo (13)

The 2024 season is the 120th season in the history of IF Elfsborg and the 25th consecutive year of its presence in the Swedish top flight.

== Transfers ==
=== In ===
| Pos. | Player | Transferred from | Fee | Date | Source |
|---|---|---|---|---|---|
| DF | (Tunisia) Rami Kaib | (Sweden) Djurgården | Free | 16 February 2024 | |
| GK | (Denmark) Marcus Bundgaard | (Denmark) Vendsyssel FF | €340,000 | 14 March 2024 | |
| MF | (Kosovo) Arbër Zeneli | Unattached | Free | 21 March 2024 | |

=== Out ===
| Pos. | Player | Transferred to | Fee | Date | Source |
|---|---|---|---|---|---|
| GK | (Iceland) Hákon Valdimarsson | (England) Brentford | €2,600,000 | 26 January 2024 | |
| FW | (Denmark) Jeppe Okkels | (Netherlands) FC Utrecht | Free | 30 January 2024 | |
| FW | (Sweden) Jack Cooper Love | (Sweden) GAIS | Loan | 1 February 2024 | |
| MF | (Sweden) Kevin Holmén | (Sweden) Degerfors IF | Loan | 1 February 2024 | |
| DF | (The Gambia) Maudo Jarjué | (Norway) Sandefjord | Free | 7 March 2024 | |

== Pre-season and friendlies ==
| 26 January 2024 Friendly | IF Elfsborg (Sweden) | 3–3 | (Denmark) Odense BK |
| 13:00 |

| 30 January 2024 Friendly | Fredrikstad FK (Norway) | 3–0 | (Sweden) IF Elfsborg |
| 15:30 |

| 4 February 2024 Friendly | IF Elfsborg (Sweden) | 4–5 | (Denmark) FC København |
| 20:00 |

| 9 February 2024 Friendly | IF Elfsborg (Sweden) | 1–2 | (Denmark) Silkeborg IF |
| 12:00 |

| 21 February 2024 Friendly | IF Elfsborg (Sweden) | 3–1 | (Norway) Odd |
| 13:00 |

| 16 March 2024 Friendly | BK Häcken (Sweden) | 1–3 | (Sweden) IF Elfsborg | Gothenburg |
| 13:00 | Rygaard 9' | Report | Ouma 7'; Frick 72'; Söderberg 89' | Stadium: Bravida Arena |

| 22 March 2024 Friendly | IF Elfsborg (Sweden) | 4–0 | (Sweden) Halmstads BK | Borås |
| 18:00 | Söderberg 7'; Zeneli 21' (pen.); Frick 59'; Qasem 64' | | (red card) 81' | Stadium: Borås Arena |

== Competitions ==
=== Overall record ===
| Competition | First match | Last match | Starting round | Final position | Record | | | | | | | |
| Competition | First match | Last match | Starting round | Final position | Pld | W | D | L | GF | GA | GD | Win % |
|---|---|---|---|---|---|---|---|---|---|---|---|---|
| Allsvenskan | 1 April 2024 | 10 November 2024 | Matchday 1 | | 30 | 13 | 6 | 11 | 52 | 44 | +8 | 43.33 |
| 2023–24 Svenska Cupen | 18 February 2024 | 3 March 2024 | Group stage | Group stage | 3 | 1 | 1 | 1 | 6 | 5 | +1 | 33.33 |
| 2024–25 Svenska Cupen | TBD | TBD | TBD | TBD | 0 | 0 | 0 | 0 | 0 | 0 | +0 | — |
| 2024–25 UEFA Europa League | 11 July 2024 | 30 January 2025 | First qualifying round | TBD | 14 | 8 | 2 | 4 | 24 | 16 | +8 | 57.14 |
| Total | | | | | 47 | 22 | 9 | 16 | 82 | 65 | +17 | 46.81 |

Last updated: 12 December 2024
Source: Soccerway

=== Allsvenskan ===
==== League table ====
| Pos | Team | Pld | W | D | L | GF | GA | GD | Pts | Qualification or relegation |
|---|---|---|---|---|---|---|---|---|---|---|
| 5 | Mjällby AIF | 30 | 14 | 8 | 8 | 44 | 35 | +9 | 50 | |
| 6 | GAIS | 30 | 14 | 6 | 10 | 36 | 34 | +2 | 48 | |
| 7 | IF Elfsborg | 30 | 13 | 6 | 11 | 52 | 44 | +8 | 45 | |
| 8 | BK Häcken | 30 | 12 | 6 | 12 | 54 | 51 | +3 | 42 | Qualification for the Europa League first qualifying round (Note: BK Häcken qualified for the Europa League first qualifying round as the 2024–25 Svenska Cupen winners.) |
| 9 | IK Sirius | 30 | 12 | 5 | 13 | 47 | 46 | +1 | 41 | |

Source: svenskfotboll.se (in Swedish)
Rules for classification: 1) Points; 2) Goal difference; 3) Goals scored; 4) Head-to-head points; 5) Head-to-head goal difference; 6) Head-to-head away goals scored; 7) Play-off
(Note: Play-off is only played if need to decide champion, teams for relegation or UEFA competition and will be played on a neutral ground).

==== Results summary ====
| Overall | | | | | | | | Home | | | | | | Away | | | | | |
| Pld | W | D | L | GF | GA | GD | Pts | W | D | L | GF | GA | GD | W | D | L | GF | GA | GD |
|---|---|---|---|---|---|---|---|---|---|---|---|---|---|---|---|---|---|---|---|
| 30 | 13 | 6 | 11 | 52 | 44 | +8 | 45 | 9 | 3 | 3 | 32 | 16 | +16 | 4 | 3 | 8 | 20 | 28 | −8 |

Last updated: 10 November 2024.
Source: soccerway

==== Results by round ====
| Round | 1 | 2 | 3 | 4 | 5 | 6 | 7 | 8 | 9 | 10 | 11 | 12 | 13 | 14 | 15 | 16 | 17 | 18 | 19 | 20 | 21 | 22 | 23 | 24 | 25 | 26 | 27 | 28 | 29 | 30 |
|---|---|---|---|---|---|---|---|---|---|---|---|---|---|---|---|---|---|---|---|---|---|---|---|---|---|---|---|---|---|---|
| Ground | H | A | A | H | A | H | H | A | H | A | H | A | H | A | H | H | A | H | A | H | A | A | H | H | A | A | H | A | H | A |
| Result | D | W | L | L | L | W | W | L | W | L | W | L | W | W | W | L | L | W | D | W | D | W | D | D | W | L | L | L | W | D |
| Position | 8 | 6 | 10 | 11 | 13 | 13 | 8 | 11 | 8 | 9 | 8 | 9 | 7 | 5 | 4 | 7 | 7 | 5 | 7 | 5 | 6 | 5 | 7 | 7 | 5 | 6 | 7 | 8 | 7 | 7 |

Updated to match(es) played on 10 November 2024. Source: worldfootball
A = Away; H = Home; W = Win; D = Draw; L = Loss

==== Matches ====
| 1 April 2024 1 | IF Elfsborg | 2–2 | Värnamo | Borås |
| 16:30 CEST (UTC+2) | | Report | | Stadium: Borås Arena; Referee: Fredrik Klitte |

| 7 April 2024 2 | Västerås SK | 0–1 | IF Elfsborg | Västerås |
| 16:30 CEST (UTC+2) | | Report | | Stadium: Hitachi Energy Arena; Referee: Richard Sundell |

| 15 April 2024 3 | Hammarby | 3–0 | IF Elfsborg | Johanneshov |
| 19:10 CEST (UTC+2) | | Report | | Stadium: Tele2 Arena; Referee: Glenn Nyberg |

| 22 April 2024 4 | IF Elfsborg | 1–2 | Kalmar FF | Borås |
| 19:00 CEST (UTC+2) | | Report | | Stadium: Borås Arena; Referee: Mohammed Al-Hakim |

| 25 April 2024 5 | IFK Norrköping | 4–2 | IF Elfsborg | Norrköping |
| 19:00 CEST (UTC+2) | | Report | | Stadium: PlatinumCars Arena; Referee: Granit Maqedonci |

| 29 April 2024 6 | IF Elfsborg | 2–0 | Sirius | Borås |
| 19:00 CEST (UTC+2) | Zeneli 45+5'; Frick 59' | Report | | Stadium: Borås Arena; Referee: Fredrik Klitte |

| 5 May 2024 7 | IF Elfsborg | 3–1 | Malmö FF | Borås |
| 14:00 CEST (UTC+2) | Zeneli 34'; Hedlund 63'; Olsson 74' (o.g.) | | Jørgensen 80' | Stadium: Borås Arena; Referee: Kristoffer Karlsson |

| 12 May 2024 8 | Djurgården | 2–0 | IF Elfsborg | Johanneshov |
| 16:30 CEST (UTC+2) | Sabovic 47'; Gulliksen 70' | | | Stadium: Tele2 Arena |

| 15 May 2024 9 | IF Elfsborg | 6–1 | AIK | Borås |
| 19:00 CEST (UTC+2) | Abdullai 6', 18'; Qasem 45+1', 60', 89' (pen.); Baidoo 51' | | Celina 73' | Stadium: Borås Arena |

| 19 May 2024 10 | GAIS | 2–1 | IF Elfsborg | Gothenburg |
| 16:30 CEST (UTC+2) | Axel Henriksson 4' 18' | Report | Baidoo 40'; Holmén (yellow card) 66' | Stadium: Gamla Ullevi; Attendance: 8,319; Referee: (Sweden) Richard Sundell |

| 24 May 2024 11 | IF Elfsborg | 2–0 | Halmstads BK | Borås |
| 19:00 CEST (UTC+2) | Larsson (yellow card) 35' (goal) 89'; Thomasen (yellow card) 45+2'; Qasem 49' | Report | | Stadium: Borås Arena; Attendance: 7,122; Referee: (Sweden) Tess Olofsson |

| 28 May 2024 17 | Malmö | 2–1 | IF Elfsborg | Malmö |
| 19:00 CEST (UTC+2) | Botheim (yellow card) 21'; Peña (yellow card) 26'; Bolin 40'; Kiese Thelin 57' (yellow card) 63'; Gabriel Busanello (yellow card) 90+5' | Report | Zeneli 9'; Kaib (yellow card) 50'; Larsson (yellow card) 75'; Camil Jebara (yellow card) 82' | Stadium: Eleda Stadion; Attendance: 20,488; Referee: (Sweden) Joakim Östling |

| 1 June 2024 12 | IFK Göteborg | 1–0 | IF Elfsborg | Gothenburg |
| 15:00 CEST (UTC+2) | Norlin 34'; Hausner (yellow card) 48' | Report | Abdullai (yellow card) 53' | Stadium: Gamla Ullevi; Attendance: 17,183; Referee: (Sweden) Adam Ladebäck |

| 6 July 2024 13 | IF Elfsborg | 3–0 | Brommapojkarna | Borås |
| 15:00 CEST (UTC+2) | Holmén (yellow card) 27'; Hedlund 30'; Zeneli (yellow card) 45'; Baidoo 82'; Guðmundsson 87'; Yegbe (yellow card) 88' | Report | | Stadium: Borås Arena; Attendance: 5,905; Referee: (Sweden) Oscar Johnson |

| 14 July 2024 14 | Häcken | 3–5 | IF Elfsborg | Gothenburg |
| 16:30 CEST (UTC+2) | Gustafson 22' (yellow card) 40'; Lunddal Friðriksson 45+2'; Rygaard (yellow card) 45+5'; Linde (yellow card) 48'; Amane (yellow card) 63'; Youssef 66' | Report | Holmén 26'; Henriksson (yellow card) 40'; Camil Jebara (yellow card) 44'; Hult (yellow card) 45+5'; Yegbe 48' 90'; Zeneli (yellow card) 58'; Frick 90+2'; Zeneli 90+5' | Stadium: Bravida Arena; Attendance: 6,177; Referee: (Sweden) Mohammed Al-Hakim |

| 21 July 2024 15 | IF Elfsborg | 3–1 | Mjällby | Borås |
| 16:30 CEST (UTC+2) | Abdullai 1' 42'; Holmén 51' | Report | Stroud 27'; Ståhl (yellow card) 90+5' | Stadium: Borås Arena; Attendance: 6,121; Referee: (Sweden) Granit Maqedonci |

=== 2023–24 Svenska Cupen ===
==== Group stage ====
| Pos | Team | Pld | W | D | L | GF | GA | GD | Pts | Qualification | DEG | IFE | GAIS | ÖIS |
|---|---|---|---|---|---|---|---|---|---|---|---|---|---|---|
| 1 | Degerfors IF | 3 | 1 | 2 | 0 | 9 | 4 | +5 | 5 | Advance to Knockout stage | | | 2–2 | 5–0 |
| 2 | IF Elfsborg | 3 | 1 | 1 | 1 | 6 | 5 | +1 | 4 | | 2–2 | | 2–0 | |
| 3 | GAIS | 3 | 1 | 1 | 1 | 5 | 4 | +1 | 4 | | | | | 3–0 |
| 4 | Örgryte IS | 3 | 1 | 0 | 2 | 3 | 10 | −7 | 3 | | | 3–2 | | |

Source: SvFF
Rules for classification: 1) Points; 2) Goal difference; 3) Goals scored; 4) Head-to-head record; 5) Lowest disciplinary points; 6) Highest ranked team

=== 2024–25 UEFA Europa League ===
==== First qualifying round ====
| 11 July 2024 First Leg | IF Elfsborg (Sweden) | 3-0 | (Cyprus) Pafos | Borås |
| 19:00 CEST | Zeneli 9'; Ouma (yellow card) 12'; Hult 59'; Frick 82'; Baldursson (yellow card) 90+5' | Report | Melluso (yellow card) 26' (yellow-red card) 57'; Jairo (yellow card) 38' | Stadium: Borås Arena; Attendance: 5,011; Referee: (Ukraine) Dmytro Panchyshyn |

| 18 July 2024 Second Leg | Pafos (Cyprus) | 2-5 (2-8 agg.) | (Sweden) IF Elfsborg | Limassol |
| 19:00 EEST | João Correia (red card) 15'; Holmén 25' (o.g.); Dragomir 43'; Name (yellow card) 56' | Report | Kaib (yellow card) 2'; Ouma (yellow card) 17' (goal) 22'; Baldursson (yellow card) 36' (goal) 48'; Henriksson (yellow card) 41'; Baidoo 47'; Abdullai 58'; Zeneli 85' | Stadium: Alphamega Stadium; Attendance: 3,952; Referee: (Israel) Gai Leibovitz |

==== Second qualifying round ====
| 25 July 2024 First Leg | Sheriff (Moldova) | 0-1 | (Sweden) IF Elfsborg | Tiraspol |
| 20:00 CEST | Peter Ademo (yellow card) 38'; Alesio Mija (yellow card) 73'; Badolo (yellow card) 85' | Report | Hult (yellow card) 69'; Hedlund 86' (pen.) (yellow card) 90+3' | Stadium: Sheriff Arena; Attendance: 3,751; Referee: (Czech Republic) Marek Radina |
