= Kricfalusi =

Kricfalusi or Kričfaluši is a surname of Hungarian origin. Notable people with the surname include:

- John Kricfalusi (born 1955), Canadian illustrator and blogger
- Ondřej Kričfaluši (born 2004), Czech footballer
