= Besfort =

Besfort is a masculine given name. Notable people with the name include:

- Besfort Lamallari, Albanian politician
- Besfort Zeneli (born 2002), Swedish football midfielder
