= Darius Olaru =

Romanian footballer (born 1998)

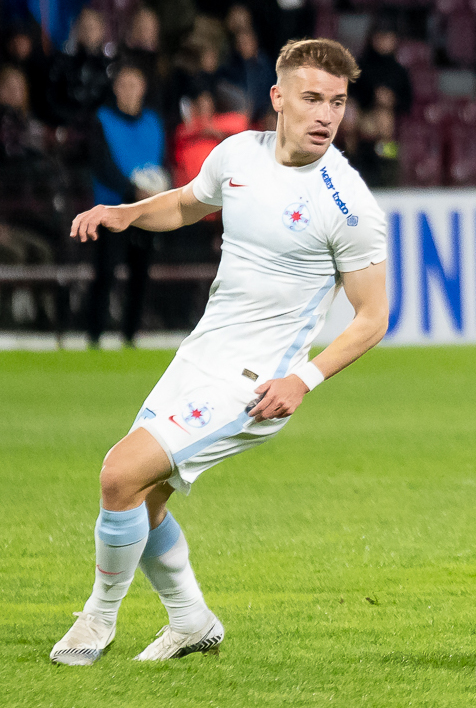
- Olaru with FCSB in 2022

Personal information
- Full name: Darius Dumitru Olaru
- Date of birth: 3 March 1998 (age 28)
- Place of birth: Mediaș, Romania
- Height: 1.77 m (5 ft 10 in)
- Position: Midfielder

Team information
- Current team: Union Saint-Gilloise
- Number: 28

Youth career
- 2008–2011: CSȘ Mediaș
- 2011–2015: Gaz Metan Mediaș

Senior career*
Years	Team	Apps	(Gls)
2015–2020	Gaz Metan Mediaș	113	(11)
2020–2026	FCSB	202	(49)
2026–	Union Saint-Gilloise	5	(1)

International career^{‡}
2018–2021	Romania U21	17	(2)
2021–	Romania	30	(0)
- * Club domestic league appearances and goals as of 8 November 2026 ‡ National team caps and goals as of 5 October 2026

Darius Dumitru Olaru (Romanian pronunciation: [ˈdari.us oˈlaru]; born 3 March 1998) is a Romanian professional footballer who plays as a midfielder for Belgian Pro League club Union Saint-Gilloise and the Romania national team.

After starting out at his hometown side Gaz Metan Mediaș, for which he amassed over 100 appearances in the Romanian top flight, Olaru transferred to FCSB in 2020. He won the Cupa României in his first season at the club, and claimed back-to-back national titles in the 2023–24 and 2024–25 campaigns. In 2026, Olaru moved abroad for the first time to Belgian side Union Saint-Gilloise.

Internationally, Olaru represented the Romania under-21 team in two editions of the UEFA European Championship, in 2019 and 2021. He then made his full debut for the country in June 2021, and was selected in the squad for Euro 2024, where they reached the round of 16.

== Club career ==
=== Gaz Metan Mediaș ===
Olaru made his senior debut for Gaz Metan Mediaș on 29 August 2015, appearing in a 2–1 away win over UTA Arad in the second division. He amassed twelve games and scored two goals during the campaign, as his hometown club returned to the Liga I after only one year of absence.

Olaru recorded his debut in the latter competition on 19 September 2016, in a 2–0 victory against defending champions Astra Giurgiu. On 23 May 2017, he scored his first league goal from the penalty spot in a 3–0 defeat of Concordia Chiajna.

=== FCSB ===
In early 2018, Olaru signed a precontract with fellow Liga I side FCSB, but the move initially fell through after a transfer fee could not be agreed upon. In May the following year, the capital-based reinstated its interest and signed him for an undisclosed sum, with the deal seeing him join up with the squad at the start of 2020. FCSB reportedly outbid CFR Cluj for the transfer of Olaru, where he was highly regarded by manager Dan Petrescu.

Olaru was officially unveiled as a FCSB player on 7 January 2020, and was assigned the number 27 jersey. He made his first appearance for the Roș-albaștrii in a 0–1 loss to CFR Cluj on 2 February, and four days later scored the opener in a 2–1 win over Voluntari.

On 27 August 2020, Olaru made his debut in European competitions by starting and scoring in the 3–0 win over Shirak counting for the UEFA Europa League first qualifying round. Following the conclusion of his first full season at the club, during which he played 30 matches and netted seven times in the league, he was named to the 2020–21 Liga I Team of the Season by the Liga Profesionistă de Fotbal.

In the 2023–24 campaign, Olaru aided with a career-best 15 goals in 36 league games, as FCSB won its first national title in nine years. On 9 July 2024, he scored a hat-trick in a 7–1 away thrashing of Virtus in the Champions League first qualifying round. On 13 August, he netted and assisted against Sparta Prague in the second leg of the Champions League third qualifying round (2–3 home loss, 3–4 on aggregate). Olaru continued his goalscoring form in the Europa League play-off round, scoring the only goal of the second leg against LASK to help his team qualify for the league phase (2–1 on aggregate).

In early 2025, Olaru sustained an injury during the winter training camp in Antalya. Following surgery, he was ruled out for the remainder of the season, which concluded with FCSB winning a second consecutive league title despite his absence. Olaru returned to form in the 2025–26 Europa League play-off round, scoring twice in a 3–0 home victory over Aberdeen that secured a 5–2 aggregate qualification. On 6 November, he scored his team's only goal in a 1–3 league phase loss to Basel; his 56th-minute dipping volley was later voted by fans as the competition's Goal of the League Phase.

=== Union Saint-Gilloise ===
In mid-June 2026, multiple sources reported that Olaru was close to a €3 million transfer to Belgian club Union Saint-Gilloise, with the deal pending a medical examination. On the 16th, he officially signed a four-year contract with Les Unionistes.

On 31 July 2026, Olaru made his official debut by appearing as a starter and playing 71 minutes in the Belgian Super Cup against Club Brugge. Following a 1–1 draw in regulation time, Union won the match 5–4 on penalties. He scored his first Belgian Pro League goal on 8 August, netting as a substitute in a 5–1 away win over Westerlo on the opening day of the season.

== International career ==
=== Youth ===
Olaru received his first call-up for the Romania national under-21 team in September 2018, and on 15 November that year scored in a 3–3 friendly draw with Belgium in Cluj-Napoca. He was subsequently selected in Mirel Rădoi's squad for the 2019 UEFA European Under-21 Championship, where he played two matches in the group stage and was an unused substitute in the 2–4 defeat to Germany in the semi-finals.

Olaru's age also made him eligible for the 2021 edition of the European Championship, where head coach Adrian Mutu started him in all three fixtures of the group stage. Romania finished with the same number of points as the Netherlands and Germany, but could not progress to the knockout stage because of head-to-head points and overall goal difference.

=== Senior ===
Following Olaru's good display throughout the 2020–21 season, Mirel Rădoi—who was in the meantime promoted to the senior national team—handed him his full debut on 2 June 2021, in a 1–2 friendly loss to Georgia.

Olaru amassed six games in the Euro 2024 qualifiers, entering mostly as a substitute as Romania finished its group in first place. On 7 June 2024, he was named in the squad for the final tournament. Olaru entered as a substitute in both the 0–2 loss to Belgium in the group stage and in the 0–3 loss to the Netherlands in the round of 16.

== Style of play ==
Initially deployed as an attacking midfielder or a winger, Olaru developed into more of a box-to-box midfielder after joining FCSB. Romanian manager Ioan Sabău described him as "a player who is physically and mentally involved [in his team], both defends and attacks, also has physical strength and appears earnest". Although naturally right-footed, Olaru can score with either foot due to his ambidexterity.

== Personal life ==
Olaru's parents left Romania in order to work abroad and got divorced at some point during his childhood, leaving him mainly in the care of his grandparents. He stated that he was an ardent supporter of Dinamo București growing up.

In May 2025, Olaru wed his long-time partner Cristina Pădurean, a civil law notary, with the couple sharing images from their wedding ceremony on social media.

== Career statistics ==
=== Club ===
As of match played 8 November 2026

Appearances and goals by club, season and competition
Club	Season	League			Național cup (Note: Includes Cupa României.)		Cupa Ligii		Europe		Other		Total	
Club	Season	Division	Apps	Goals	Apps	Goals	Apps	Goals	Apps	Goals	Apps	Goals	Apps	Goals
Gaz Metan Mediaș	2015–16	Liga II	12	2	0	0	—		—		—		12	2
Gaz Metan Mediaș	2016–17	Liga I	10	1	1	0	1	0	—		—		12	1
Gaz Metan Mediaș	2017–18	Liga I	36	1	4	0	—		—		—		40	1
Gaz Metan Mediaș	2018–19	Liga I	34	4	1	0	—		—		—		35	4
Gaz Metan Mediaș	2019–20	Liga I	21	3	0	0	—		—		—		21	3
Gaz Metan Mediaș	Total		113	11	6	0	1	0	0	0	0	0	120	11
FCSB	2019–20	Liga I	12	2	4	1	—		—		—		16	3
FCSB	2020–21	Liga I	30	7	0	0	—		1 (Note: Appearance in UEFA Europa League)	1	0	0	31	8
FCSB	2021–22	Liga I	36	6	1	0	—		0	0	—		37	6
FCSB	2022–23	Liga I	37	1	0	0	—		10 (Note: Appearances in UEFA Europa Conference League)	0	—		47	1
FCSB	2023–24	Liga I	36	15	3	0	—		4	0	—		43	15
FCSB	2024–25	Liga I	17	8	2	0	—		12 (Note: Six appearances and four goals in UEFA Champions League, six appearances and three goals in UEFA Europa League)	7	0	0	31	15
FCSB	2025–26	Liga I	34	10	1	0	—		13 (Note: Three appearances and one goal in UEFA Champions League, ten appearances and four goals in UEFA Europa League)	5	3 (Note: One appearance in Supercupa României, two appearances in Liga I European play-offs)	0	51	15
FCSB	Total		202	49	11	1	—		40	13	3	0	256	63
Union Saint-Gilloise	2026–27	Belgian Pro League	5	1	0	0	—		6 (Note: Two appearances in UEFA Champions League, four appearances in UEFA Europa League)	0	1 (Note: Appearance in Belgian Super Cup)	0	12	1
Career total			320	61	17	1	1	0	46	13	4	0	388	75

=== International ===
As of match played 5 October 2026

Appearances and goals by national team and year
National team	Year	Apps	Goals
Romania	2021	2	0
Romania	2022	7	0
Romania	2023	6	0
Romania	2024	11	0
Romania	2025	1	0
Romania	2026	3	0
Total		30	0

== Honours ==
Gaz Metan Mediaș

- Liga II: 2015–16

FCSB

- Liga I: 2023–24, 2024–25
- Cupa României: 2019–20
- Supercupa României: 2024, 2025

Union Saint-Gilloise

- Belgian Super Cup: 2026

Individual

- Liga I Team of the Season: 2020–21, 2021–22, 2023–24
- Gazeta Sporturilor Romania Player of the Month: April 2022, September 2023
