= Promise David =

Canadian soccer player (born 2001)

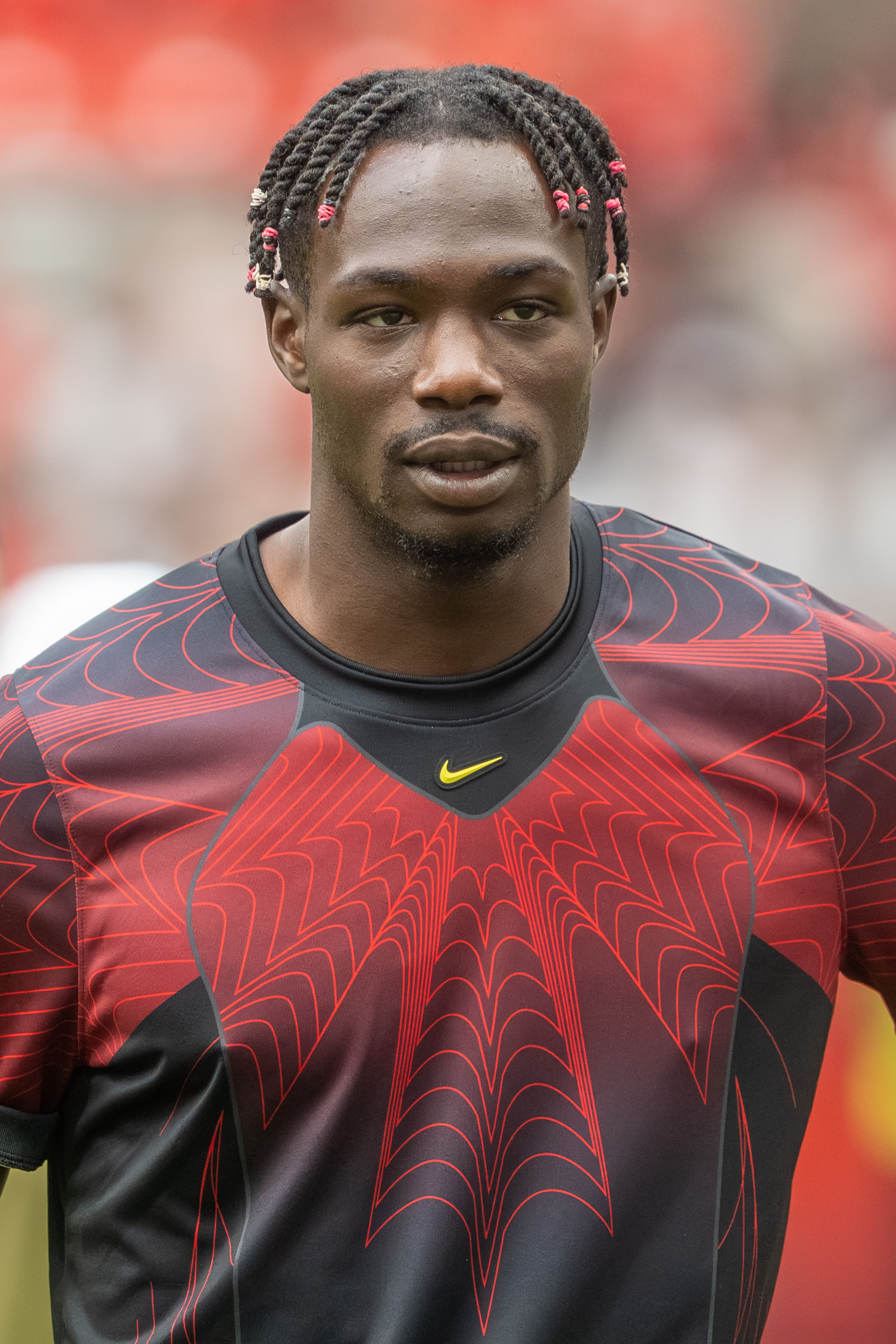
- David with Canada in 2026

Personal information
- Full name: Promise Oluwatobi Emmanuel David Akinpelu
- Date of birth: July 3, 2001 (age 25)
- Place of birth: Brampton, Ontario, Canada
- Height: 1.95 m (6 ft 5 in)
- Position: Striker

Team information
- Current team: Brighton & Hove Albion (on loan from Union SG)
- Number: 12

Youth career
- 2012–2016: Toronto FC
- 2016–2019: Vaughan Azzurri
- 2019–2020: Trnje
- 2021–2022: FC Tulsa

Senior career*
Years	Team	Apps	(Gls)
2019–2021	Trnje	5	(1)
2022	Valletta	9	(2)
2022–2023	Sirens	7	(0)
2023	Nõmme Kalju U21	19	(22)
2023–2024	Nõmme Kalju	39	(21)
2024–	Union SG	59	(29)
2026–	→ Brighton & Hove Albion (loan)	2	(0)

International career^{‡}
2022	Nigeria U23	2	(0)
2025–	Canada	18	(4)
- * Club domestic league appearances and goals as of September 5, 2026 ‡ National team caps and goals as of November 17, 2026

Promise Oluwatobi Emmanuel David Akinpelu (born July 3, 2001) is a Canadian professional soccer player who plays as a striker for Premier League club Brighton & Hove Albion, on loan from Belgian Pro League club Union Saint-Gilloise, and the Canada national team.

== Early life ==
David was born in Canada to Nigerian parents. David played youth soccer with the Toronto FC Academy, before moving to his local club Vaughan Azzurri in 2016.

== Club career ==
=== Early career ===
In 2019, David was scouted by the Croatian club Trnje and joined their youth academy. On September 18, 2021, he signed an academy contract with the American club FC Tulsa.

=== Malta ===
In January 2022, David joined the Maltese club Valletta on a short-term contract. He scored the goal that got Valletta to the 2021–22 Maltese FA Trophy final, where they finished runners-up. On June 20, 2022, he transferred to Sirens, also in Malta.

=== Nõmme Kalju ===
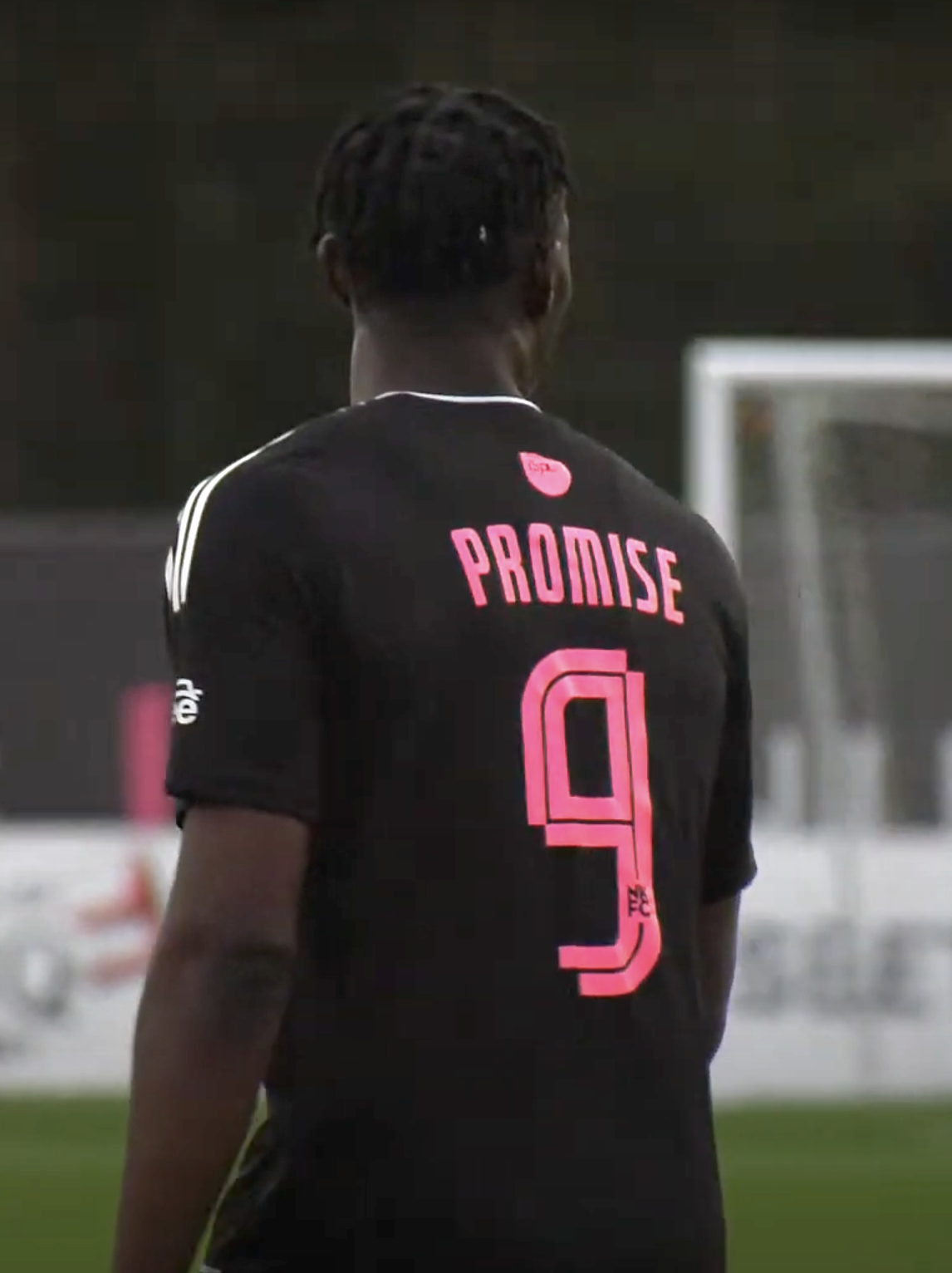
Promise David made his breakthrough in professional football with Estonian club Nõmme Kalju FC

On February 13, 2023, David moved to Estonia with Nõmme Kalju. He initially played for the club's reserve team in the Estonian third tier before establishing himself in the first team and scoring seven goals in his inaugural Premium Liiga season.

David credited Kalju's training demands and plyometric exercises as crucial elements in his turnaround. In the following 2024 league season with Kalju, he scored 14 goals and provided three assists in 16 matches.

=== Union SG ===
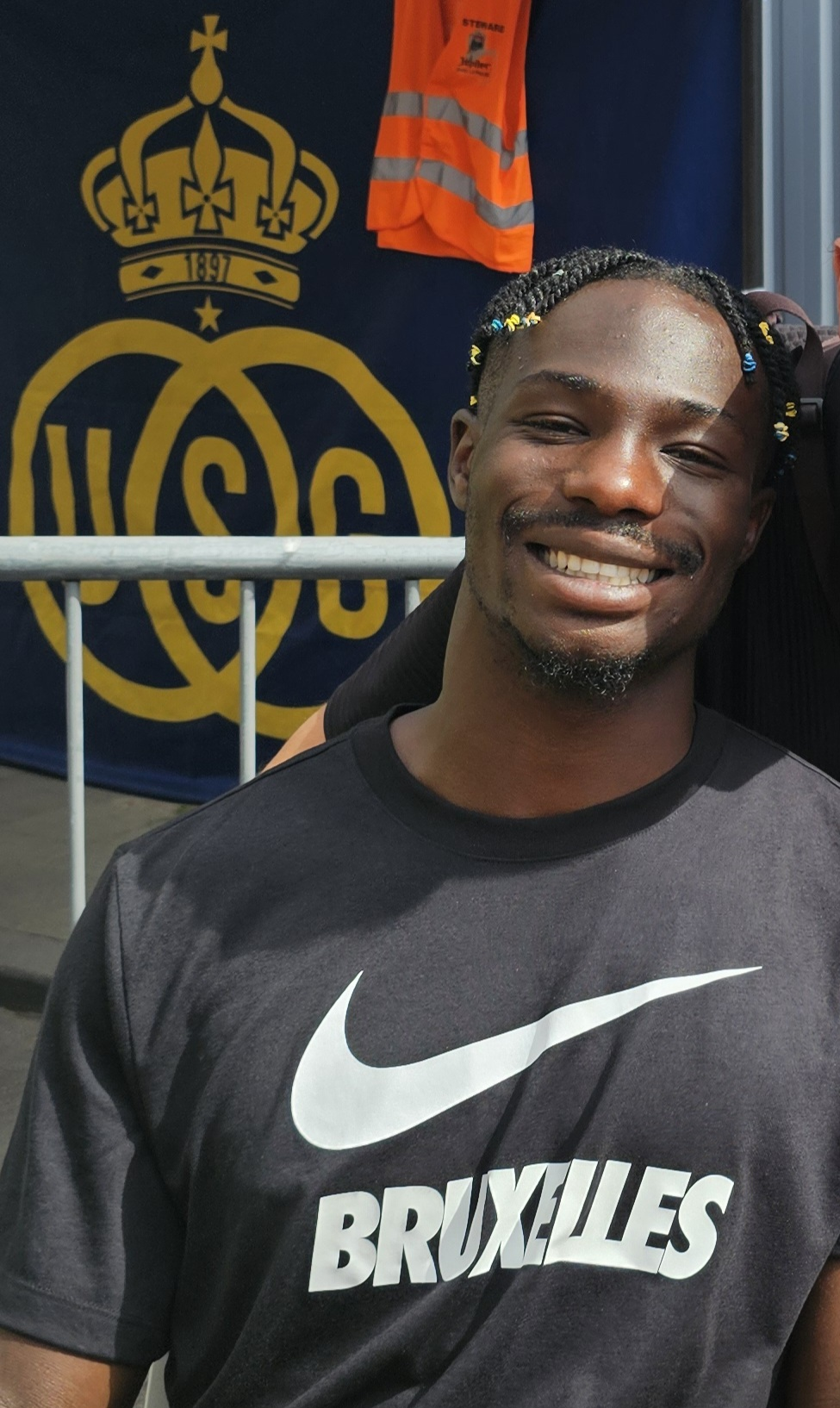
Promise David with Union SG in 2025

In July 2024, David signed with Union SG of the Belgian Pro League, on a three-year contract with an option of a further year. He debuted with them as a substitute during the 2024 Belgian Super Cup on July 20, where the club would be eventual 2–1 victors over Club Brugge.

David scored his first goal for his new club on August 10 in a 4–3 away defeat against Westerlo. He concluded the 2024–25 season with 19 goals, including a brace in a 3–1 victory over Gent on the final matchday of the champions' play-offs, securing his club's first league title in 90 years. On June 17, 2025, David signed a new contract with Union Saint-Gilloise, extending his stay with the club until 2029.

==== Loan to Brighton ====
On 18 August 2026, David joined Premier League club Brighton & Hove Albion on a season-long loan, with an obligation to buy for a proposed fee of £22 million if certain undisclosed criteria were met.

== International career ==
=== Youth ===
In October 2022, he was called up to the Nigeria U23s for a set of 2023 U-23 Africa Cup of Nations qualification matches against the Tanzania U23s. He debuted with the Nigeria U23s, a 1–1 tie in the first leg with Tanzania U23 on October 22, 2022.

=== Senior ===
In January 2025, after inquiries from the Nigerian Football Federation, David stated that he was focused on playing for his country of birth, Canada, at senior level.

On February 21, 2025, David's request to switch allegiance to Canada was approved by FIFA. On March 12, 2025, he received his first senior call-up to the Canada national team for the 2025 CONCACAF Nations League Finals. He made his international debut on June 7, 2025, also scoring his first goal for Canada in a 4–2 friendly victory against Ukraine during the 2025 Canadian Shield. The next month in July, David was named to the squad for the 2025 CONCACAF Gold Cup.

In February 2026 David suffered a hip injury with his club side which put his World Cup ambitions in jeopardy, but on May 29 he was named to the 26-man squad for the FIFA World Cup, which Canada co-hosted with Mexico and the United States, having recovered sufficiently. On June 12, 2026, David made his FIFA World Cup debut in Canada's opening group-stage match against Bosnia and Herzegovina in Toronto. He came on as a second-half substitute and provided the assist for Cyle Larin's equalizing goal in a 1–1 draw; the result earned Canada its first-ever point at the FIFA World Cup. In Canada's final group match on June 24, he scored in a 2–1 defeat against Switzerland, which saw them finish as runners-up in Group B; Canada advanced to the knock-out stages of the World Cup for the first time in its history.

== Career statistics ==
=== Club ===
As of match played October 22, 2026

Appearances and goals by club, season and competition
Club	Season	League			National cup (Note: Includes Maltese FA Trophy, Estonian Cup, Belgian Cup)		League cup		Continental		Other		Total	
Club	Season	Division	Apps	Goals	Apps	Goals	Apps	Goals	Apps	Goals	Apps	Goals	Apps	Goals
Valletta	2021–22	Maltese Premier League	9	2	5	4	—		—		—		14	6
Sirens	2022–23	Maltese Premier League	7	0	—		—		—		—		7	0
Nõmme Kalju U21	2023	Esiliiga B	19	22	—		—		—		—		19	22
Nõmme Kalju	2023	Meistriliiga	23	7	3	6	—		—		—		26	13
Nõmme Kalju	2024	Meistriliiga	16	14	2	3	—		—		—		18	17
Nõmme Kalju	Total		39	21	5	9	—		—		—		44	30
Union SG	2024–25	Belgian Pro League	34	19	3	4	—		3 (Note: One appearance in UEFA Champions League, two appearances and one goal in UEFA Europa League)	1	1 (Note: Appearance in Belgian Super Cup)	0	41	24
Union SG	2025–26	Belgian Pro League	24	9	5	4	—		7 (Note: Appearances in UEFA Champions League)	2	1	0	37	15
Union SG	2026–27	Belgian Pro League	1	1	—		—		2	1	1	0	4	2
Union SG	Total		59	29	8	8	—		12	4	3	0	82	41
Brighton & Hove Albion (loan)	2026–27	Premier League	2	0	0	0	0	0	2 (Note: Appearances in UEFA Conference League)	0	—		4	0
Career total			135	74	18	22	0	0	14	4	3	0	170	99

=== International ===
As of match played November 16, 2026

Appearances and goals by national team and year
National team	Year	Apps	Goals
Canada	2025	8	3
Canada	2026	10	1
Total		18	4

Scores and results list Canada's goal tally first, score column indicates score after each David goal.

List of international goals scored by Promise David
No.	Date	Venue	Opponent	Score	Result	Competition
1	June 7, 2025	BMO Field, Toronto, Canada	Ukraine	3–0	4–2	2025 Canadian Shield
2	June 17, 2025	BC Place, Vancouver, Canada	Honduras	5–0	6–0	2025 CONCACAF Gold Cup
3	November 18, 2025	Chase Stadium, Fort Lauderdale, United States	Venezuela	2–0	2–0	Friendly
4	June 24, 2026	BC Place, Vancouver, Canada	Switzerland	1–2	1–2	2026 FIFA World Cup

== Honours ==
Union Saint-Gilloise

- Belgian Pro League: 2024–25
- Belgian Cup: 2025–26
- Belgian Super Cup: 2024, 2026

Individual

- Meistriliiga Player of the Month: April 2024
