= Dido Havenaar =

Japanese footballer

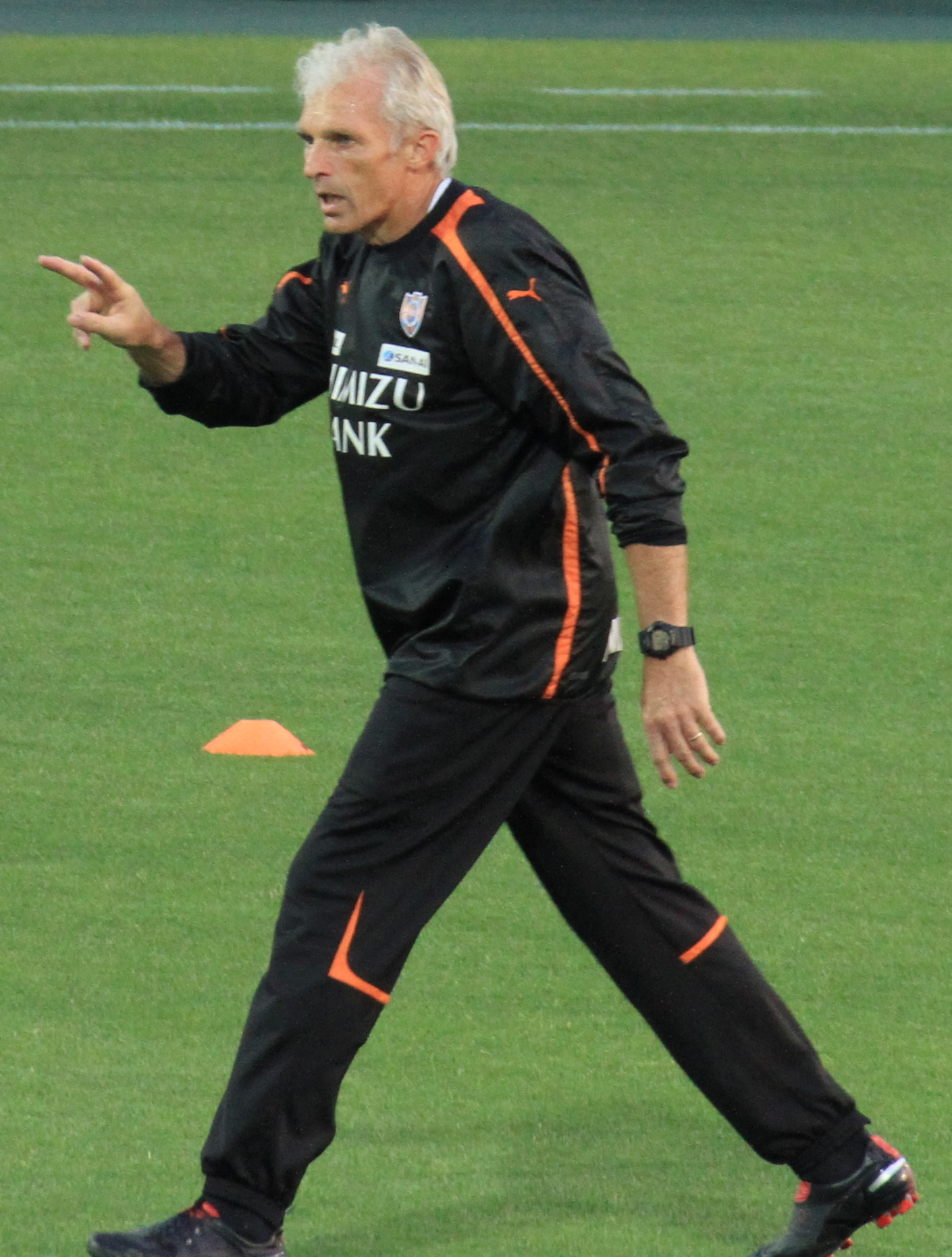
- Havenaar in 2012

Personal information
- Date of birth: 26 September 1957 (age 69)
- Place of birth: Hazerswoude-Dorp, Netherlands
- Position: Goalkeeper

Senior career*
Years	Team	Apps	(Gls)
1980–1984	FC Den Haag	79	(0)
1984–1986	Yamaha Motors		
1986–1989	Mazda	71	(0)
1989–1991	Yomiuri	4	(0)
1992–1994	Nagoya Grampus Eight	46	(0)
1995–1996	Júbilo Iwata	68	(0)
1997–1998	Consadole Sapporo	60	(0)
Total		328	(0)
Medal record
Mazda
Runner-up	Emperor's Cup	1987
Yomiuri
Winner	Japan Soccer League	1990/91
Runner-up	Japan Soccer League	1989/90
- * Club domestic league appearances and goals

Dido Havenaar (born 26 September 1957) is a Dutch football coach and former professional player who played as a goalkeeper, primarily in Japan. His sons Mike and Nikki are also footballers.

== Playing career ==
Havenaar was born in Hazerswoude-Dorp on 26 September 1957. In 1979, he joined Den Haag. He played in 80 matches for the club. In 1984, he moved to Japan and joined Japan Soccer League club Yamaha Motors and coach Hans Ooft. He was elected to the Best Eleven in the 1986–87 season and his club Mazda was runner-up in the 1987 Emperor's Cup. The club was relegated to Division 2 in 1988. In 1989, he moved to Yomiuri. He hardly played due to injury. He retired and became a goalkeeper coach at Toyota Motors (later Nagoya Grampus Eight) in 1991.

In 1992, the Japan Soccer League was folded and the J1 League was formed. Havenaar returned as a player for Nagoya Grampus Eight. He played many matches while battling with Yuji Ito for the #1 shirt. In January 1994, his family became naturalized Japanese citizens. In 1995, he moved to Júbilo Iwata and played regularly. In 1997, he moved to Japan Football League club Consadole Sapporo. He played as the #1 goalkeeper and the club won the J2 League title in 1997, resulting in promotion to the J1 League. He retired at the end of the 1998 season, at the age of 41.

== Coaching career ==
In 1991, Havenaar retired from playing and became a goalkeeper coach for Toyota Motors (later Nagoya Grampus). In 1992, he returned as a player. In 1993, he also served as goalkeeper coach for the Japan national team for 1994 World Cup qualification under manager Hans Ooft who was coach when Havenaar played for Mazda. In 1995, he moved to Júbilo Iwata and became a playing goalkeeper coach. He left the club at the end of the 1996 season.

Havenaar retired from playing at Consadole Sapporo after the end of the 1998 season and became goalkeeper coach at Consadole under manager Takeshi Okada in 1999. He coached the club until 2002. In 2003, he moved to Yokohama F. Marinos and became a goalkeeper coach under manager Okada again. The club won the 2003 and 2004 J1 titles. He coached the club until 2006. In 2008, he returned to Nagoya Grampus and became an assistant coach. In September 2011, he moved to Shimizu S-Pulse and became a coach as goalkeeper coach Masanori Sanada's successor. In 2013, he moved to South Korea and became a goalkeeper coach for Suwon Samsung Bluewings. He coached the club until 2014.
