= Guilherme Smith =

Brazilian footballer (born 2003)

Personal information
- Full name: Guilherme Henriques da Silva Carvalho
- Date of birth: 11 June 2003 (age 23)
- Place of birth: Brazil
- Height: 1.83 m (6 ft 0 in)
- Positions: Winger; striker

Team information
- Current team: Union Saint-Gilloise
- Number: 11

Youth career
- 2012–2017: Vasco da Gama
- 2017: Fluminense
- 2017–2021: Botafogo

Senior career*
Years	Team	Apps	(Gls)
2021–2024	Zorya Luhansk	1	(0)
2022	→ Braga U23 (loan)		
2022–2023	→ Braga U23 (loan)		
2024–2025	Nõmme Kalju	35	(12)
2025–	Union Saint-Gilloise	31	(5)

International career
2019	Brazil U17		
- * Club domestic league appearances and goals as of 25 October 2026

Guilherme Henriques da Silva Carvalho (born 11 June 2003), known as Guilherme Smith, is a Brazilian professional footballer who plays as a winger or striker for Belgian Pro League club Union Saint-Gilloise.

== Club career ==
=== Early years ===
Guilherme Smith is a product of the Vasco da Gama, Fluminense and Botafogo academies, all from Rio de Janeiro, Brazil.

=== Zorya Luhansk ===
In June 2021 he signed a three-year contract with the Ukrainian Premier League club Zorya Luhansk. He made his debut on 28 October 2021 as a start-squad player in a winning away match against Rukh Lviv in the Round of 16 of the Ukrainian Cup.

=== Nõmme Kalju ===
On 1 August 2024, Guilherme Smith joined Estonian side Nõmme Kalju, on a contract until end of 2026, which also included an option to extend it for another year.

=== Union Saint-Gilloise ===
On 12 August 2025, Smith signed for Belgian Pro League club Union Saint-Gilloise on a contract until 2029.

== Career statistics ==
As of match played 25 October 2026

Appearances and goals by club, season and competition
Club	Season	League			National cup (Note: Includes Ukrainian Cup, Estonian Cup, Belgian Cup)		Continental		Other		Total	
Club	Season	Division	Apps	Goals	Apps	Goals	Apps	Goals	Apps	Goals	Apps	Goals
Zorya Luhansk	2021–22	Ukrainian Premier League	0	0	1	0	0	0	—		1	0
Zorya Luhansk	2023–24	Ukrainian Premier League	1	0	0	0	0	0	—		1	0
Zorya Luhansk	Total		1	0	1	0	0	0	—		2	0
Nõmme Kalju	2024	Meistriliiga	15	7	1	1	—		—		16	8
Nõmme Kalju	2025	Meistriliiga	20	5	3	2	4 (Note: Appearances in UEFA Conference League)	0	—		27	7
Nõmme Kalju	Total		35	12	4	3	4	0	—		43	15
Union Saint-Gilloise	2025–26	Belgian Pro League	22	4	5	0	2 (Note: Appearances in UEFA Champions League)	0	—		29	4
Union Saint-Gilloise	2026–27	Belgian Pro League	9	1	0	0	5 (Note: Two appearances and one goal in UEFA Champions League, three appearances two goals in UEFA Europa League)	3	1 (Note: Appearance in Belgian Super Cup)	0	15	4
Union Saint-Gilloise	Total		31	5	5	0	7	3	1	0	44	8
Career total			67	17	10	3	11	3	1	0	89	23

== Honours ==
Union SG

- Belgian Cup: 2025–26
- Belgian Super Cup: 2026
