= 2022–23 FC Thun season =

FC Thun
2022–23 season
- Chairman: Markus Lüthi
- Stadium: Stockhorn Arena
- Swiss Challenge League: 7th
- Swiss Cup: Round 3

The 2022–23 season is the 125th season in the history of FC Thun and their 9th consecutive season in the second division. The club are participating in Swiss Challenge League and the Swiss Cup. The season covers the period from 1 July 2022 to 30 June 2023.

== Players ==
As of 27 July 2022

Note: Flags indicate national team as defined under FIFA eligibility rules; some limited exceptions apply. Players may hold more than one non-FIFA nationality.

| No. | Pos. | Nation | Player |
|---|---|---|---|
| 1 | GK | SUI | Andreas Hirzel |
| 4 | MF | GER | Fabian Rüdlin |
| 5 | DF | JPN | Nikki Havenaar |
| 6 | MF | SUI | Leonardo Bertone |
| 7 | MF | SUI | Miguel Castroman |
| 8 | MF | SUI | Gabriel Barès (on loan from Montpellier) |
| 9 | FW | GER | Gabriel Kyeremateng |
| 11 | MF | SUI | Omer Dzonlagic |
| 13 | DF | SUI | Nicolas Lüchinger |
| 14 | DF | SUI | Erik Wyssen |
| 16 | MF | SUI | Justin Roth |
| 20 | FW | SUI | Yannick Toure (on loan from Young Boys) |

| No. | Pos. | Nation | Player |
|---|---|---|---|
| 21 | MF | SUI | Uros Vasic |
| 22 | GK | SUI | Nino Ziswiler |
| 23 | DF | SUI | Marco Bürki |
| 24 | MF | SUI | Roland Ndongo |
| 27 | MF | SUI | Daniel Dos Santos |
| 29 | DF | SUI | Nias Hefti |
| 34 | DF | SUI | Nicola Sutter |
| 70 | MF | GER | Josué Schmidt |
| 77 | FW | SUI | Zemerart Lekaj |
| 94 | MF | IRQ | Hiran Ahmed |
| 99 | GK | SUI | Nico Stucki |

== Pre-season and friendlies ==
Win Draw Loss Fixtures

| 25 June 2022 Friendly | Thun (Switzerland) | 3–3 | (Switzerland) St. Gallen | Heimberg, Switzerland |
| 15:30 CEST (UTC+2) | | | | Stadium: Sportplatz Heimberg |

| 2 July 2022 Friendly | Thun (Switzerland) | 2–1 | (Switzerland) Lausanne-Ouchy | Gstaad, Switzerland |
| 16:30 CEST (UTC+2) | | | | Stadium: Sportplatz Schützebode |

| 9 July 2022 Friendly | Thun (Switzerland) | 0–1 | (Switzerland) Lausanne | Gstaad, Switzerland |
| 16:30 CEST (UTC+2) | | | | Stadium: Sportplatz Schützebode |

| 30 December 2022 Friendly | Thun (Switzerland) | 2–1 | (Switzerland) Sion | Thun, Switzerland |
| 13:30 CET (UTC+1) | | | | Stadium: Stockhorn Arena |

| 10 January 2023 Friendly | Thun (Switzerland) | 0–1 | (Switzerland) Bellinzona | Thun, Switzerland |
| 14:30 CET (UTC+1) | | | | Stadium: Stockhorn Arena |

| 14 January 2023 Friendly | Thun (Switzerland) | Cancelled | (Liechtenstein) Vaduz | Bern, Switzerland |
| 11:00 CET (UTC+1) | | | | Stadium: Stadion Wankdorf |

| 14 January 2023 Friendly | Young Boys (Switzerland) | 2–0 | (Switzerland) Thun | Bern, Switzerland |
| 11:00 CET (UTC+1) | Monteiro 37'; Rrudhani 49' | | | Stadium: Stadion Wankdorf |

== Competitions ==
=== Overall record ===
| Competition | First match | Last match | Starting round | Record | | | | | | | |
| Competition | First match | Last match | Starting round | Pld | W | D | L | GF | GA | GD | Win % |
|---|---|---|---|---|---|---|---|---|---|---|---|
| Swiss Challenge League | 15 July 2022 | May 2023 | Matchday 1 | 18 | 5 | 7 | 6 | 28 | 30 | −2 | 27.78 |
| Swiss Cup | 19 August 2022 | | Round 1 | 2 | 2 | 0 | 0 | 6 | 1 | +5 | 100.00 |
| Total | | | | 20 | 7 | 7 | 6 | 34 | 31 | +3 | 35.00 |

Last updated: 26 November 2022
Source: Soccerway

=== Swiss Challenge League ===
==== League table ====
| Pos | Team | Pld | W | D | L | GF | GA | GD | Pts | Promotion or qualification |
|---|---|---|---|---|---|---|---|---|---|---|
| 4 | Aarau | 36 | 15 | 12 | 9 | 63 | 57 | +6 | 57 | |
| 5 | Wil | 36 | 16 | 8 | 12 | 62 | 52 | +10 | 56 | |
| 6 | Thun | 36 | 12 | 13 | 11 | 62 | 55 | +7 | 49 | |
| 7 | Schaffhausen | 36 | 12 | 8 | 16 | 51 | 59 | −8 | 44 | |
| 8 | Vaduz | 36 | 7 | 16 | 13 | 54 | 56 | −2 | 37 | Qualification for the Europa Conference League first qualifying round (Note: Vaduz qualified for the Europa Conference League first qualifying round by winning the 2022–23 Liechtenstein Cup.) |

Source: Swiss Challenge League
Rules for classification: 1) Points; 2) Goal difference; 3) Goals scored; 4) Head-to-head goal difference; 5) Away goals scored; 6) Draw.

==== Results summary ====
| Overall | | | | | | | | Home | | | | | | Away | | | | | |
| Pld | W | D | L | GF | GA | GD | Pts | W | D | L | GF | GA | GD | W | D | L | GF | GA | GD |
|---|---|---|---|---|---|---|---|---|---|---|---|---|---|---|---|---|---|---|---|
| 4 | 0 | 2 | 2 | 4 | 7 | −3 | 2 | 0 | 2 | 0 | 3 | 3 | 0 | 0 | 0 | 2 | 1 | 4 | −3 |

Last updated: 5 August 2022.
Source: Swiss Challenge League

==== Results by round ====
| Round | 1 | 2 | 3 | 4 | 5 |
|---|---|---|---|---|---|
| Ground | A | H | A | H | A |
| Result | L | D | L | D | |
| Position | | | | | |

Updated to match(es) played on 5 August 2022. Source: Swiss Challenge League
A = Away; H = Home; W = Win; D = Draw; L = Loss

==== Matches ====
The league fixtures were announced on 17 June 2022.

=== Swiss Cup ===
| 19 August 2022 Round 1 | Bulle | v | Thun | Bulle |
| 19:00 CEST (UTC+2) | | | | Stadium: Stade de Bouleyres |
