= Besfort Zeneli =

Swedish footballer (born 2002)

- Zeneli with Sweden in 2026

Personal information
- Date of birth: 21 November 2002 (age 23)
- Place of birth: Säter, Sweden
- Height: 1.87 m (6 ft 2 in)
- Position: Midfielder

Team information
- Current team: Union Saint-Gilloise
- Number: 23

Youth career
- 2007–2021: IF Elfsborg

Senior career*
Years	Team	Apps	(Gls)
2022–2025	IF Elfsborg	68	(4)
2026–	Union Saint-Gilloise	24	(5)

International career^{‡}
2023	Kosovo U21	6	(0)
2025–	Sweden	13	(0)
- * Club domestic league appearances and goals as of 20:15, 25 October 2026 (UTC) ‡ National team caps and goals as of 18:30, 6 October 2026 (UTC)

Besfort Zeneli (born 21 November 2002) is a Swedish professional footballer who plays as a midfielder for Belgian Pro League club Union Saint-Gilloise and the Sweden national team.

== Club career ==
=== IF Elfsborg ===
On 6 January 2022, Zeneli signed his first professional contract with Allsvenskan side IF Elfsborg after agreeing to a two-year deal. On 21 July 2022, he was named as an IF Elfsborg substitute for the first time in a 2022–23 UEFA Europa Conference League second qualifying round against Molde. His debut with IF Elfsborg came seven days later in the 2022–23 UEFA Europa Conference League second qualifying round again against Molde after coming on as a substitute at 73rd minute in place of Michael Baidoo. On 11 September 2022, Zeneli made his league debut in a 2–0 away win against GIF Sundsvall after coming on as a substitute at last minutes again in place of Michael Baidoo.

=== Royale Union Saint-Gilloise ===
On 13 January 2026 Zeneli joined Belgian club Royale Union Saint-Gilloise.

== International career ==
=== Kosovo ===
Zeneli was eligible to represent two countries on international level, either Sweden or Kosovo. On 18 October 2021, Zeneli declared through an interview for Koha Ditore that he is waiting for a call-up from Football Federation of Kosovo to represent Kosovo at the under-21 level and that he had refused to represent Sweden at the youth level even though he had the opportunity to choose. On 15 September 2022, Zeneli received a call-up from Kosovo U21 for a training camp held in Antalya, Turkey and for the hybrid friendly match against Greenland.

On 18 March 2023, Zeneli received again a call-up from Kosovo U21 for the friendly matches against Moldova and Turkey. His official debut with Kosovo U21 came six days later in the friendly match against Moldova after coming on as a substitute in place of Veton Tusha.

=== Sweden ===
On 9 September 2024, Zeneli declined a call-up to Kosovo U21 and announced him deciding to represent Sweden on an international level instead, due to the alleged mistreatment of him and his brother by the Football Federation of Kosovo.

On 24 February 2025, Zeneli's request to switch allegiance to Sweden was accepted by FIFA. On 12 March 2025, he accepted a call-up to the senior team for the friendly matches against Luxembourg and Northern Ireland. He made his full international debut on 22 March 2025, playing for 45 minutes in a friendly 1–0 loss against Luxembourg before being replaced by Yasin Ayari.

On 12 May 2026, Zeneli was named in the Sweden squad for the 2026 FIFA World Cup.

== Personal life ==
Born and raised in Sweden, Zeneli is of Albanian origin from Selac, a village near Mitrovica, Kosovo. He is the younger brother of the Kosovo international player Arbër Zeneli.

== Career statistics ==
=== Club ===
As of match played 25 October 2026

Appearances and goals by club, season and competition
Club	Season	League			National cup (Note: Includes Svenska Cupen, Belgian Cup)		Europe		Other		Total	
Club	Season	Division	Apps	Goals	Apps	Goals	Apps	Goals	Apps	Goals	Apps	Goals
IF Elfsborg	2022	Allsvenskan	2	0	0	0	1 (Note: Appearance in UEFA Conference League)	0	—		3	0
IF Elfsborg	2023	Allsvenskan	14	1	1	0	—		—		15	1
IF Elfsborg	2024	Allsvenskan	25	1	3	0	13 (Note: Appearances in UEFA Europa League)	0	—		41	1
IF Elfsborg	2025	Allsvenskan	27	2	5	0	2	0	—		34	2
IF Elfsborg	Total		68	4	9	0	16	0	—		93	4
Union Saint-Gilloise	2025–26	Belgian Pro League	15	3	1	0	0	0	—		16	3
Union Saint-Gilloise	2026–27	Belgian Pro League	9	2	1	1	5 (Note: Two appearances in UEFA Champions League, three appearances in UEFA Europa League)	0	1 (Note: Appearance in Belgian Super Cup)	0	16	3
Union Saint-Gilloise	Total		24	5	2	1	5	0	1	0	32	6
Career total			92	8	11	1	21	0	1	0	125	10

=== International ===
As of match played 5 October 2026

Appearances and goals by national team and year
National team	Year	Apps	Goals
Sweden	2025	5	0
Sweden	2026	8	0
Total		13	0

== Honours ==
Union SG

- Belgian Cup: 2025–26
- Belgian Super Cup: 2026
