= Hazerswoude-Dorp =

- Village
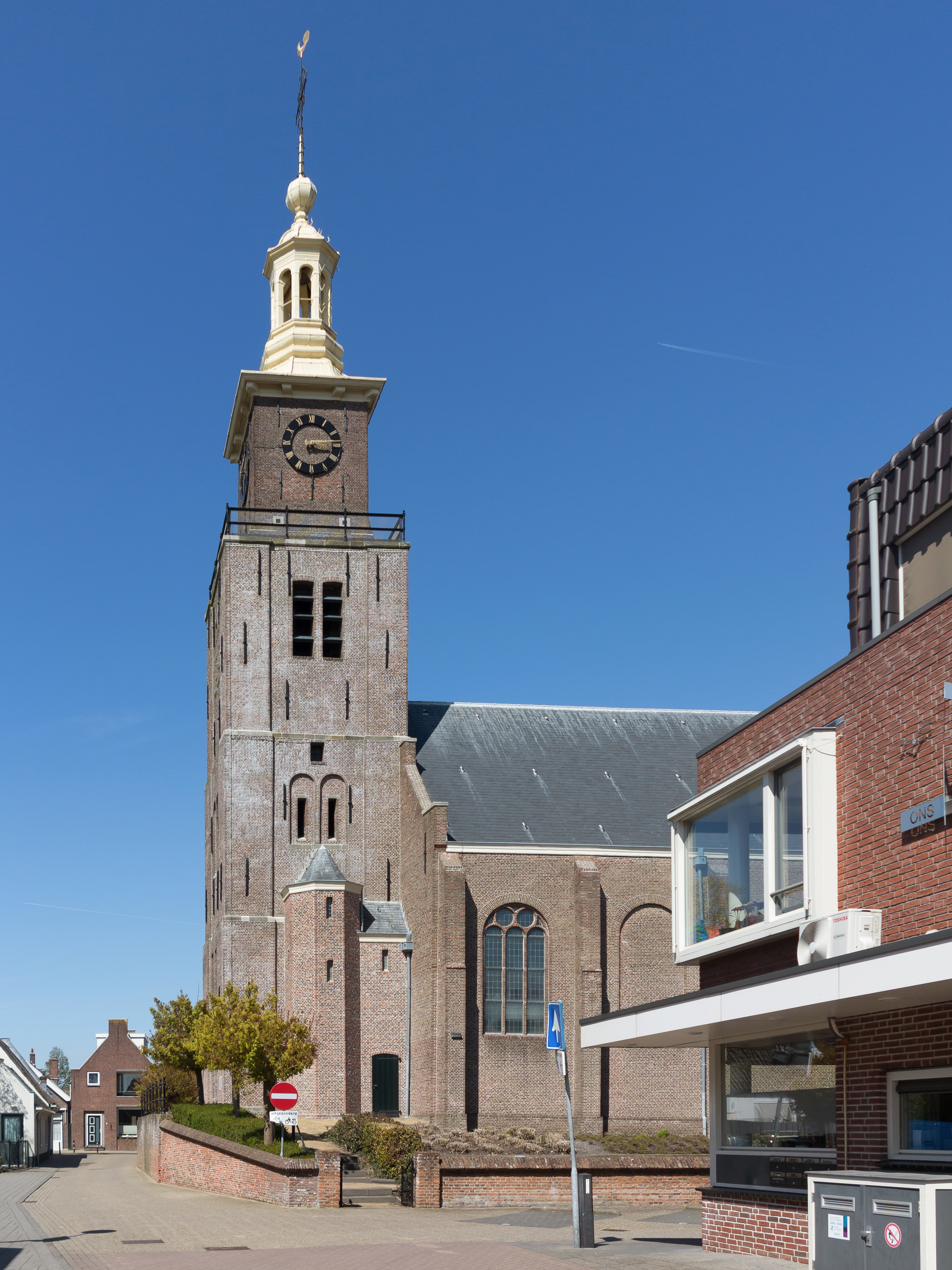
- church: de Nederlands Hervormde kerk

- Location in the province of South Holland in the Netherlands Location in the Netherlands
- Coordinates: 52°5′46″N 4°35′16″E
- Country: Netherlands
- Province: South Holland
- Municipality: Alphen aan den Rijn

Area
  - Total: 29.17 km^{2} (11.26 sq mi)
- Elevation: −1.2 m (−3.9 ft)

Population (2021)
  - Total: 6,155
  - Density: 211.0/km^{2} (546.5/sq mi)
- Time zone: UTC+1 (CET)
  - Summer (DST): UTC+2 (CEST)
- Postal code: 2391
- Dialing code: 0172

Hazerswoude-Dorp is a village in the west of the Netherlands. It is located in the municipality of Alphen aan den Rijn, South Holland, about 7 km southwest of the town of Alphen aan den Rijn.

Hazerswoude-Dorp is a peat excavation settlement which developed in the Middle Ages. It turned into a linear settlement along the dike on the Oude Rijn. A circular canal was dug around the view to prevent a prolapse of the village.

The Dutch Reformed church is a single aisled cruciform church. The tower dates from 1646 as a replacement of its medieval predecessor. The church itself was built in 1658.

== Gallery ==
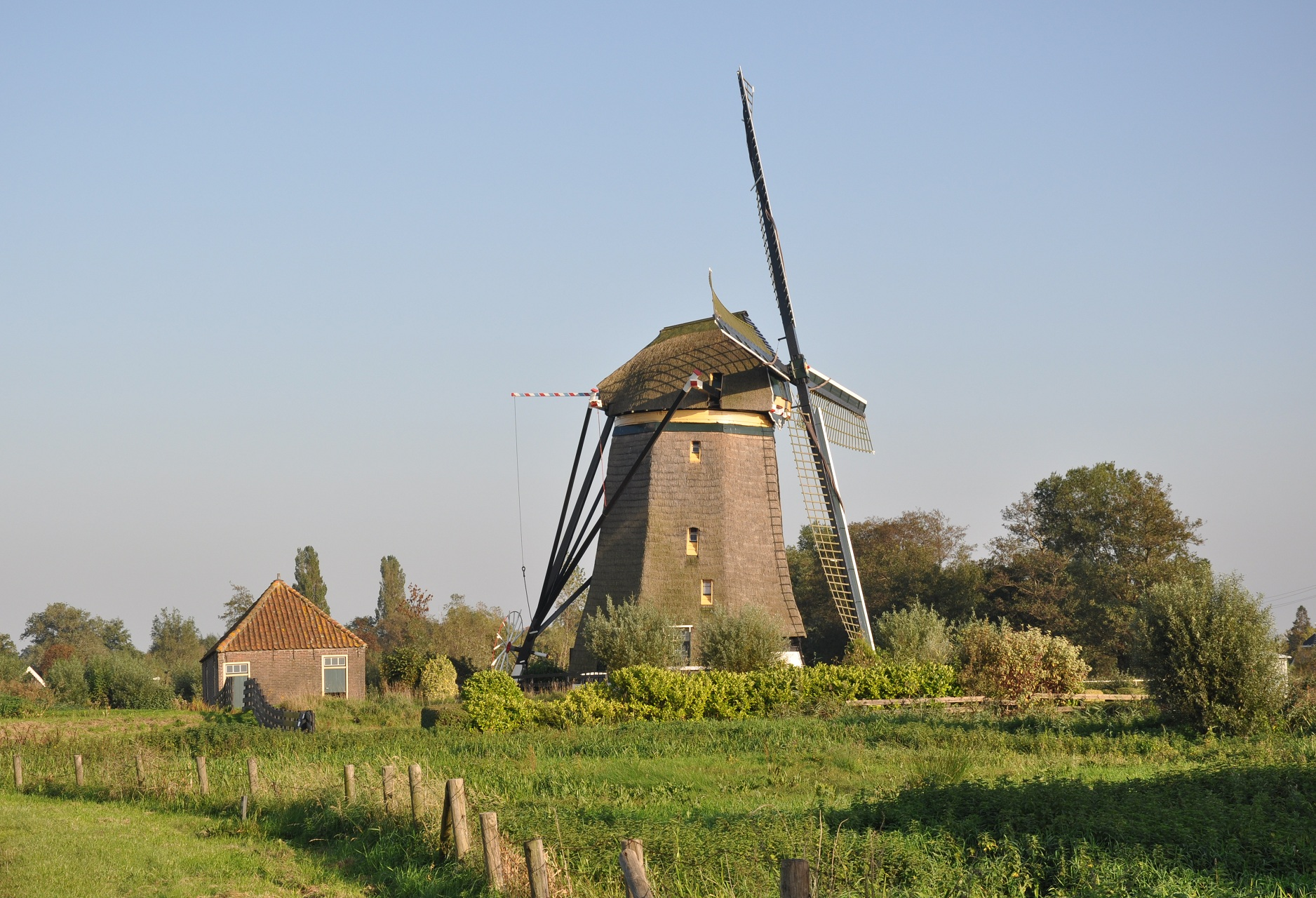
The Rietveldse Molen (Windmill of Rietveld) in the rural part of Hazerswoude

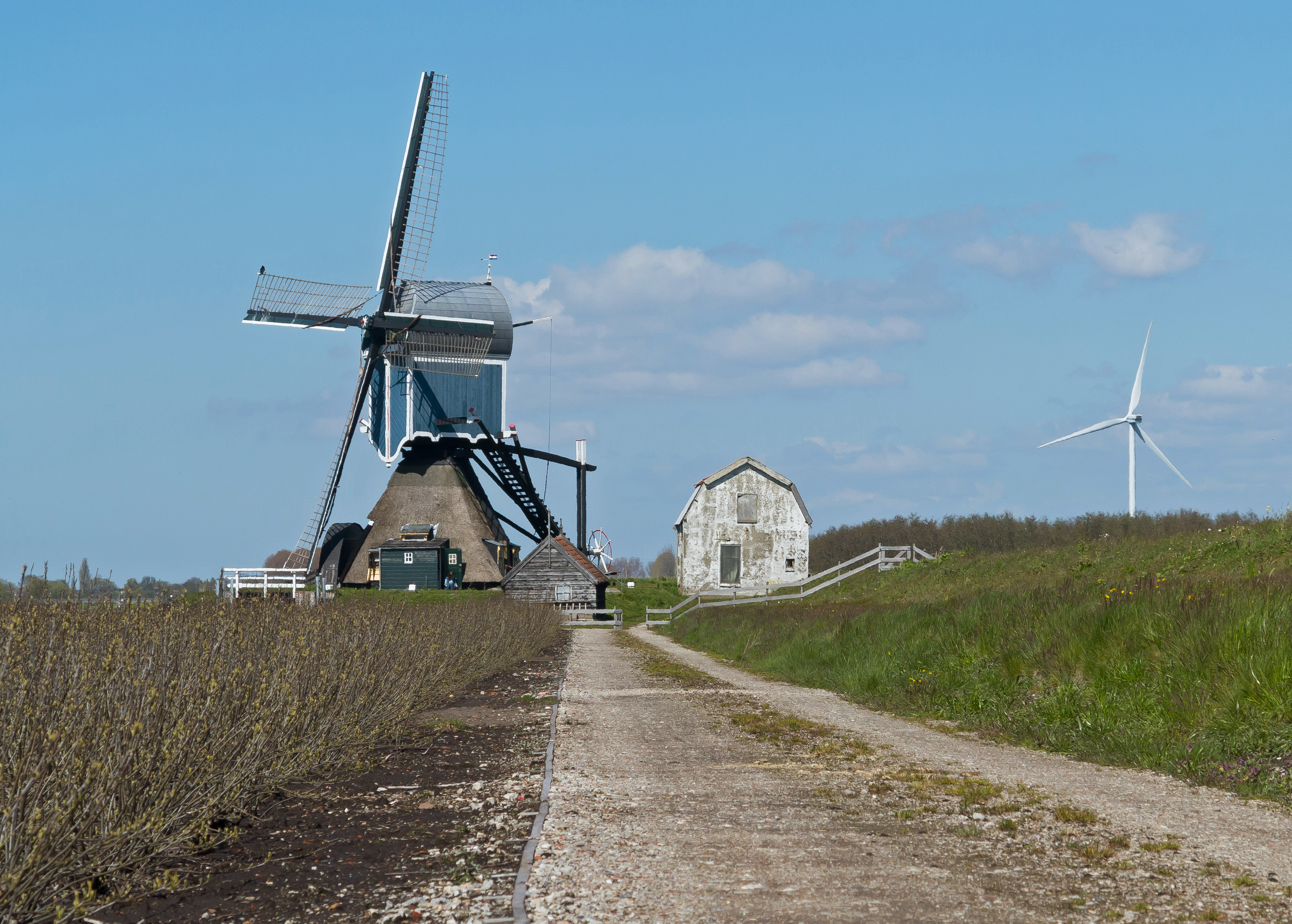
Windmill: de Gere Molen

== Famous residents ==
- Tom Okker (born 1944), Dutch tennis player; world # 3; now art dealer
