= Massiré Sylla =

Senegalese footballer (born 2005)

Personal information
- Date of birth: 7 January 2005 (age 21)
- Place of birth: Dakar, Senegal
- Position: Defender

Team information
- Current team: Union Saint-Gilloise
- Number: 29

Youth career
- 2016–2022: Diambars FC

Senior career*
Years	Team	Apps	(Gls)
2023–2024	Diambars FC		
2024	Pau II	7	(0)
2024–2026	Lyn 2	6	(0)
2024–2026	Lyn	28	(0)
2026–	Union Saint-Gilloise	14	(1)

International career^{‡}
2026–	Senegal	1	(0)
- * Club domestic league appearances and goals as of 21:14, 10 November 2026 (UTC) ‡ National team caps and goals as of 23:59, 16 November 2026 (UTC)

Massiré Sylla (born 7 January 2005) is a Senegalese professional footballer who plays as a defender for Belgian Pro League club Union Saint-Gilloise and the Senegal national team.

== Career ==
=== Early career ===
Massiré Sylla began his football journey at the Diambars FC academy in Senegal, an institution known for developing young talents, such as Idrissa Gueye. During his time at Diambars, Sylla played as a defensive midfielder and also demonstrated versatility by performing in central defense.

=== Pau ===
In March 2024, Sylla signed a two-and-a-half-year contract with Pau FC, joining the team from Diambars FC. His arrival adds to the growing Senegalese presence in the team, which included at the time Henri Saivet and Bingourou Kamara. Sylla's contract runs until June 2026.

Sylla started his tenure at Pau FC with the reserve team in National 3. His performances in the reserve squad earned him a spot in the first team, being part of the group for the 2024–25 Ligue 2.

=== Lyn ===
On the Norwegian Deadline Day in September 2024, Sylla was announced as Lyn's new signing. Sylla signed a contract that ran until the end of the 2027 season.

=== Union SG ===
On 14 January 2026, Sylla joined Belgian Pro League side Union SG for a reported fee exceeding €1.55 million, signing a contract until 2030.

== Career statistics ==
=== Club ===
As of match played 25 October 2026

Appearances and goals by club, season and competition
Club	Season	League			National cup (Note: Includes Norwegian Cup)		Europe		Other		Total	
Club	Season	Division	Apps	Goals	Apps	Goals	Apps	Goals	Apps	Goals	Apps	Goals
Pau II	2023–24	CFA 2	6	0	—		—		—		6	0
Pau II	2024–25	CFA 2	1	0	—		—		—		1	0
Pau II	Total		7	0	—		—		—		7	0
Lyn	2024	1. divisjon	3	0	0	0	—		1 (Note: Appearance in 1. divisjon promotional play-offs)	0	4	0
Lyn	2025	1. divisjon	24	0	5	1	—		—		29	1
Lyn	Total		27	0	5	1	—		1	0	33	1
Lyn 2	2024	4. divisjon	3	0	—		—		—		3	0
Lyn 2	2025	3. divisjon	3	1	—		—		—		3	1
Lyn 2	Total		6	1	—		—		—		6	1
Union Saint-Gilloise	2025–26	Belgian Pro League	3	0	0	0	—		—		3	0
Union Saint-Gilloise	2026–27	Belgian Pro League	8	1	1	0	5 (Note: Two appearances in UEFA Champions League, three appearances in UEFA Europa League)	0	1 (Note: Appearance in Belgian Super Cup)	0	15	1
Union Saint-Gilloise	Total		11	1	2	0	4	0	1	0	18	1
Career total			51	2	7	1	4	0	2	0	64	3

=== International ===
As of match played 16 November 2026

Appearances and goals by national team and year
National team	Year	Apps	Goals
Senegal	2026	1	0
Total		1	0

== Honours ==
Individual

- Norwegian First Division Young Player of the Month: September 2025
- Norwegian First Division Young Player of the Year: 2025
