= Michael Baidoo =

Ghanaian footballer (born 1999)

Personal information
- Full name: Michael Baidoo
- Date of birth: 14 May 1999 (age 27)
- Place of birth: Accra, Ghana
- Height: 1.74 m (5 ft 9 in)
- Position: Midfielder

Team information
- Current team: Plymouth Argyle
- Number: 20

Youth career
- 2015–2017: Vision
- 2017–2018: Midtjylland

Senior career*
Years	Team	Apps	(Gls)
2018–2020	Midtjylland	1	(0)
2018–2019	→ Fredericia (loan)	16	(0)
2019–2020	→ Jerv (loan)	40	(6)
2021	Jerv	0	(0)
2021	Sandnes Ulf	29	(4)
2022–2025	Elfsborg	76	(23)
2025–	Plymouth Argyle	11	(0)
2025–2026	→ Umm Salal (loan)	14	(1)

International career
2016	Ghana U20	2	(0)
2024–	Ghana	1	(0)
- * Club domestic league appearances and goals as of 9 January 2026

Michael Baidoo (born 14 May 1999) is a Ghanaian professional footballer who plays as a midfielder for EFL League One club Plymouth Argyle and the Ghana national team.

== Club career ==
Baidoo began his career with the Ghanaian club Vision, and moved to the Danish club Midtjylland in 2018. Baidoo made his professional debut with Midtjylland in a 1–1 Danish Superliga tie with FC Nordsjælland on 11 March 2018. He was loaned out for the rest of the season on 31 August 2018 to FC Fredericia.

On 31 July 2019 it was confirmed, that Baidoo had been loaned out to Norwegian club FK Jerv for the rest of 2019. On 20 January 2020, it was confirmed that Baidoo would continue at the club on loan until the end of 2020. He signed a permanent deal with Jerv at the end of 2020.

On 3 January 2025, Baidoo signed for English club Plymouth Argyle on a three-year contract for a reported club record fee, surpassing the previous record of £1 million

== International career ==
Baidoo was called up to a pair of 2015 African U-17 Championship qualification matches for the Ghana U17s, but did not make an appearance. He has won two caps for the Ghana U20s.

Baidoo made his debut for the Ghana national team on 10 October 2024 in a Africa Cup of Nations qualifier against Sudan at the Accra Sports Stadium. He substituted Ibrahim Sulemana in the 80th minute of a 0–0 draw.

== Career statistics ==
As of match played 3 May 2025

Appearances and goals by club, season and competition
Club	Season	League			National cup (Note: Includes Norwegian Cup, Danish Cup, FA Cup)		League cup (Note: Includes EFL Cup)		Other		Total	
Club	Season	Division	Apps	Goals	Apps	Goals	Apps	Goals	Apps	Goals	Apps	Goals
Midtjylland	2017–18	Danish Superliga	1	0	1	0	—		—		2	0
Midtjylland	2018–19	Danish Superliga	0	0	0	0	—		1 (Note: Appearance(s) in UEFA Europa League)	0	1	0
Midtjylland	Total		1	0	1	0	—		1	0	3	0
Fredericia (loan)	2018–19	Danish 1st Division	16	0	0	0	—		—		16	0
Jerv	2019	Norwegian First Division	13	2	0	0	—		—		13	2
Jerv	2020	Norwegian First Division	27	4	0	0	—		="2"|—		27	4
Jerv	Total		40	6	0	0	—		—		40	6
Sandnes Ulf	2021	Norwegian First Division	29	4	1	1	—		—		30	5
Elfsborg	2022	Allsvenskan	21	8	3	0	—		1 (Note: Appearance(s) in UEFA Champions League)	0	25	8
Elfsborg	2023	Allsvenskan	28	5	1	0	—		—		29	5
Elfsborg	2024	Allsvenskan	27	10	4	0	—		14	5	45	15
Elfsborg	Total		76	23	8	0	—		15	5	99	28
Plymouth Argyle	2024–25	EFL Championship	11	0	2	0	0	0	—		14	0
Career total			174	33	12	1	0	0	16	5	202	39

== Honours ==
Midtjylland

- Danish Superliga: 2017–18
