= Ondřej Kričfaluši =

Czech footballer (born 2004)

Personal information
- Date of birth: 9 March 2004 (age 22)
- Place of birth: Czech Republic
- Height: 1.96 m (6 ft 5 in)
- Position: Centre-back

Team information
- Current team: Union Saint-Gilloise
- Number: 80

Youth career
- 2010–2014: SK Kraslice
- 2014–2018: Baník Sokolov
- 2018–2022: Slavia Prague

Senior career*
Years	Team	Apps	(Gls)
2022–2023	Slavia Prague	6	(0)
2023	→ Vlašim (loan)	13	(0)
2024–2025	Teplice	40	(0)
2025	Slavia Prague	0	(0)
2025–2026	Baník Ostrava	27	(5)
2026–	Union Saint-Gilloise	6	(0)

International career^{‡}
2022	Czech Republic U18	2	(0)
2022–2023	Czech Republic U19	8	(1)
2023	Czech Republic U20	3	(0)
2024–	Czech Republic U21	17	(2)
2026–	Czech Republic	1	(0)
- * Club domestic league appearances and goals as of 16 November 2026 ‡ National team caps and goals as of 16 November 2026

Ondřej Kričfaluši (born 9 March 2004) is a Czech professional footballer who plays as a defender for Belgian Pro League club Union Saint-Gilloise and the Czech Republic national team.

== Club career ==
Kričfaluši was raised in the Karlovy Vary Region, in the clubs SK Kraslice and Baník Sokolov. In 2018, he transferred to Slavia Prague. He made his Czech First League debut for the senior team of Slavia Prague on 21 August 2022, at the age of 18, in their 7–0 home win against Pardubice. He spent the first half of the 2023–24 season on loan in Vlašim, playing in the Czech National Football League, but thanks to his performances, he then transferred to Teplice, playing in the Czech First League. He signed a contract until 2027 with the option of a buyback by Slavia Prague. After the 2024–25 season, he was awarded the club's best player of the season.

On 2 August 2025, Slavia Prague bought back Kričfaluši from Teplice.

On 8 September 2025, Kričfaluši signed a multi-year contract with Baník Ostrava.

On 11 June 2026, Kričfaluši signed a four-year contract with Union Saint-Gilloise.

== International career ==
Kričfaluši played for the U18, U19, U20 and U21 Czech Republic youth national teams. He helped the U21 team to qualify to 2025 UEFA European Under-21 Championship. He appeared in all three matches of his team in the final tournament. Although he plays mostly as a defender at club level, he was used as a defensive midfielder in the national team.

In October 2026, Kričfaluši debuted in the senior Czech Republic national team, in a 2026–27 UEFA Nations League match against England.

== Style of play ==
At the age of 21, Kričfaluši is valued for his height, which helps him win headers, and for the high number and accuracy of forward passes.

== Career statistics ==
As of match played 20 September 2026

Appearances and goals by club, season and competition
Club	Season	League			Cup		Europe		Other		Total	
Club	Season	Division	Apps	Goals	Apps	Goals	Apps	Goals	Apps	Goals	Apps	Goals
Slavia Prague	2022–23	Czech First League	6	0	1	0	1 (Note: Appearance in UEFA Conference League)	0	—		8	0
Vlašim (loan)	2023–24	Czech National Football League	13	0	1	0	—		—		14	0
Teplice	2023–24	Czech First League	15	0	—		—		—		15	0
Teplice	2024–25	Czech First League	25	0	3	0	—		—		28	0
Teplice	Total		40	0	3	0	—		—		43	0
Slavia Prague	2025–26	Czech First League	0	0	0	0	0	0	—		0	0
Baník Ostrava	2025–26	Czech First League	27	5	4	3	—		1 (Note: Appearance in relegation play-offs)	0	31	8
Union Saint-Gilloise	2026–27	Belgian Pro League	6	0	0	0	1 (Note: Appearances in UEFA Europa League)	1	—		7	1
Career total			92	5	9	3	2	1	1	0	104	9

=== International ===
As of match played 6 October 2026

Appearances and goals by national team and year
National team	Year	Apps	Goals
Czech Republic	2026	1	0
Total		1	0
