= Nikki Havenaar =

Japanese footballer

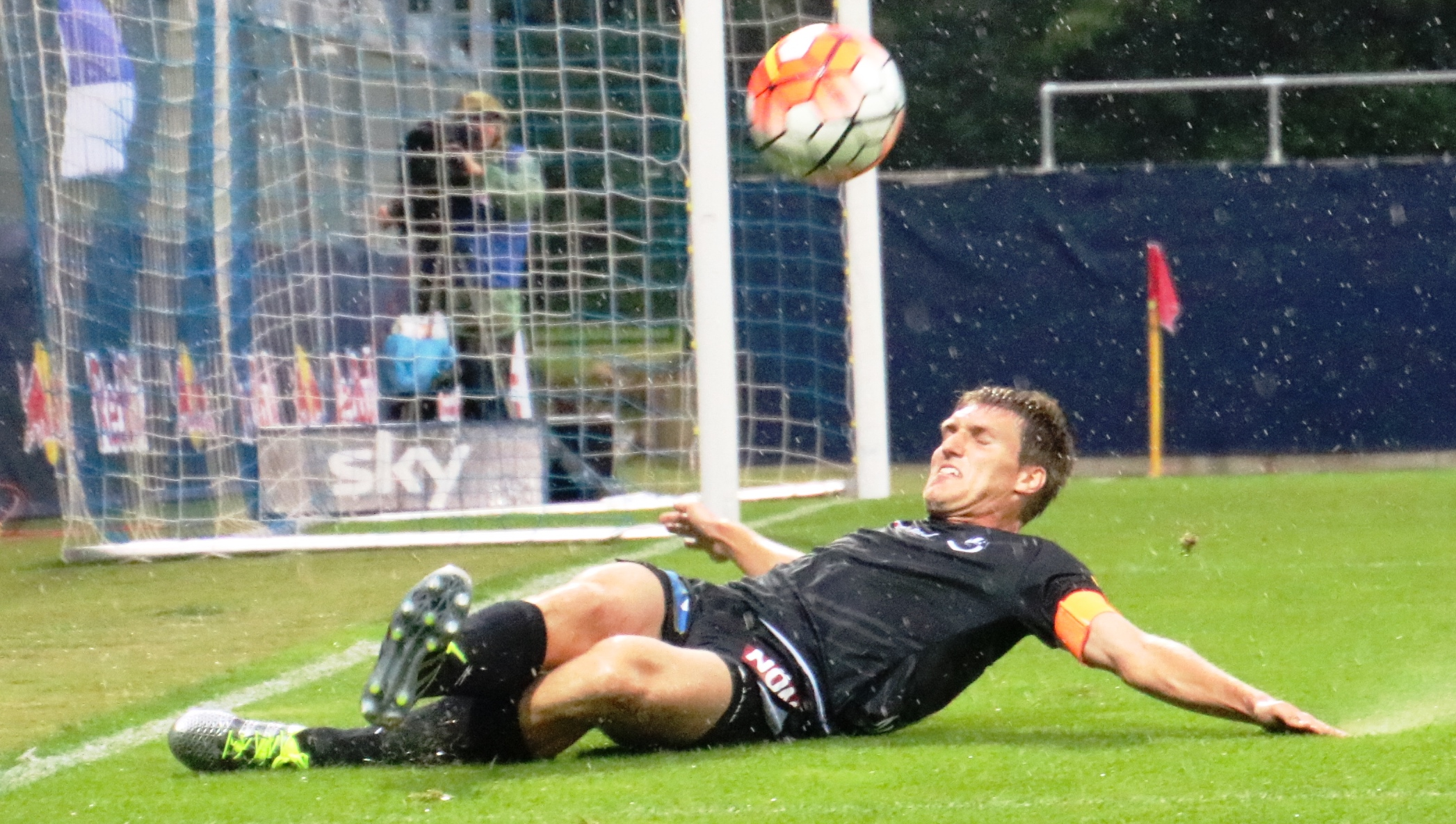
- Havenaar in 2016

Personal information
- Date of birth: 16 February 1995 (age 31)
- Place of birth: Nagoya, Aichi, Japan
- Height: 1.97 m (6 ft 6 in)
- Position: Centre-back

Team information
- Current team: Union SG
- Number: 55

Youth career
- 2010–2012: Nagoya Grampus

Senior career*
Years	Team	Apps	(Gls)
2013–2015	Nagoya Grampus	3	(0)
2014	→ J.League U22 (loan)	7	(1)
2016–2018	SV Horn	66	(4)
2018–2019	FC Wil	27	(2)
2019–2023	FC Thun	87	(14)
2022–2023	→ Neuchâtel Xamax (loan)	26	(2)
2023–2026	SV Ried	85	(15)
2026–	Union SG	7	(0)

International career
2011–2013	Japan U18	5	(1)
- * Club domestic league appearances and goals as of 25 October 2026

Nikki Havenaar (ハーフナー・ニッキ, Hāfunā Nikki; born 16 February 1995) is a Japanese professional footballer who plays for Belgian Pro League club Union SG.

== Career ==
Havenaar made his debut for Nagoya Grampus on 23 March 2013 against Sagan Tosu in the J.League Cup in which he came on in the 88th minute for Keiji Tamada as Nagoya won the match 2–1. He was released by the club in November 2015.

On 31 August 2022, Havenaar joined Neuchâtel Xamax on a season-long loan. In June 2023, he moved to Austrian side SV Ried on a deal until June 2025.

On 26 May 2026, Belgian side Union SG announced that Havenaar would join its ranks, signing a contract until the 2028–29 season.

== Personal life ==
Havenaar is a son of Dido Havenaar and younger brother of Japanese international Mike Havenaar.

== Career statistics ==
As of 25 October 2026

Appearances and goals by club, season and competition
Club	Season	League			National cup (Note: Includes J. League Cup, Swiss Cup, Austrian Cup, Belgian Cup)		League cup		Continental		Other		Total	
Club	Season	Division	Apps	Goals	Apps	Goals	Apps	Goals	Apps	Goals	Apps	Goals	Apps	Goals
Nagoya Grampus	2013	J1 League	1	0	0	0	1	0	—		—		2	0
Nagoya Grampus	2014	J1 League	2	0	0	0	1	0	—		—		3	0
Nagoya Grampus	2015	J1 League	0	0	0	0	0	0	—		—		0	0
Nagoya Grampus	Total		3	0	0	0	2	0	0	0	0	0	5	0
SV Horn	2016–17	2. Liga	33	3	—		—		—		—		33	3
SV Horn	2017–18	Austrian Regionalliga East	33	1	1	0	—		—		—		34	1
SV Horn	Total		66	4	1	0	0	0	0	0	0	0	67	4
FC Wil	2018–19	Swiss Challenge League	27	2	1	0	—		—		—		28	2
FC Thun	2019–20	Swiss Super League	25	4	2	1	—		2 (Note: Appearances in UEFA Europa League)	0	2 (Note: Appearances in promotion/relegation play-offs)	0	31	5
FC Thun	2020–21	Swiss Challenge League	32	3	—		—		—		—		32	3
FC Thun	2021–22	Swiss Challenge League	25	7	3	1	—		—		—		28	8
FC Thun	2022–23	Swiss Challenge League	5	0	1	1	—		—		—		6	1
FC Thun	Total		87	14	6	3	0	0	2	0	2	0	97	17
Xamax (loan)	2022–23	Swiss Challenge League	26	2	1	0	—		—		2	0	29	2
SV Ried	2023–24	2. Liga	27	7	1	0	—		—		—		28	7
SV Ried	2024–25	2. Liga	27	6	1	0	—		—		—		28	6
SV Ried	2025–26	Austrian Bundesliga	34	3	4	2	—		—		—		38	5
SV Ried	Total		88	16	6	2	0	0	0	0	0	0	94	18
Union Saint-Gilloise	2026–27	Belgian Pro League	7	0	1	0	—		5 (Note: Two appearances in UEFA Champions League, three appearances in UEFA Europa League)	0	0	0	13	0
Career total			304	38	15	5	2	0	7	0	4	0	333	43
