= Cheveyo Tsawa =

Swiss footballer (born 2006)

Personal information
- Date of birth: 9 December 2006 (age 19)
- Place of birth: Switzerland
- Height: 1.83 m (6 ft 0 in)
- Position: Midfielder

Team information
- Current team: Club Brugge
- Number: 16

Youth career
- –2022: FC St. Gallen
- 2022–2024: FC Zürich

Senior career*
Years	Team	Apps	(Gls)
2023–2025	Zürich II	15	(1)
2024–2026	FC Zürich	56	(5)
2026–	Club Brugge	4	(0)

International career^{‡}
2021–2022	Switzerland U16	9	(2)
2022–2023	Switzerland U17	13	(0)
2023–2024	Switzerland U18	6	(0)
2024	Switzerland U19	7	(0)
2025–	Switzerland U21	13	(1)
- * Club domestic league appearances and goals as of 10 October 2026 ‡ National team caps and goals as of 6 October 2026

Cheveyo Tsawa (born 9 December 2006) is a Swiss professional footballer who plays as a midfielder for Belgian Pro League club Club Brugge.

== Early life ==
Tsawa was born on 9 December 2006 in Switzerland. The son of Swiss footballer Dorjee Tsawa, he is of Tibetan descent through his father and has two sisters and a younger brother.

== Club career ==
As a youth player, Tsawa joined the youth academy of FC St. Gallen. In 2022, he joined the youth academy of FC Zürich and was promoted to the club's first team in 2024. On 18 February 2024, he debuted for them during a 1–0 away win over FC Luzern in the league. On 19 January 2025, he scored his first goal for them during a 1–0 win over Yverdon-Sport FC in the league.

== Style of play ==
Tsawa plays as a midfielder. Right-footed, he is known for his strength.

== Career statistics ==
As of match played 17 October 2026

Appearances and goals by club, season and competition
Club	Season	League			Cup		Europe		Other		Total	
Club	Season	Division	Apps	Goals	Apps	Goals	Apps	Goals	Apps	Goals	Apps	Goals
Zürich II	2023–24	Promotion League	7	0	—		—		—		7	0
Zürich II	2024–25	Promotion League	8	0	—		—		—		8	0
Zürich II	Total		15	0	—		—		—		15	0
FC Zürich	2023–24	Swiss Super League	6	0	0	0	—		—		6	0
FC Zürich	2024–25	Swiss Super League	16	3	2	0	—		—		18	3
FC Zürich	2025–26	Swiss Super League	34	2	2	0	—		—		36	2
FC Zürich	Total		56	5	4	0	—		—		60	5
Club Brugge	2026–27	Belgian Pro League	4	0	1	0	1 (Note: Appearances in UEFA Champions League)	0	1 (Note: Appearance in Belgian Super Cup)	0	7	0
Career total			75	5	5	0	1	0	1	0	82	5
