= 2022–23 Standard Liège season =

Standard Liège
2022–23 season
- Manager: Ronny Deila
- Stadium: Stade Maurice Dufrasne
- Belgian Pro League: 6th
- Belgian Cup: Seventh round
- Top goalscorer: League: Philip Zinckernagel (10); All: Philip Zinckernagel (10)
Home colours	Away colours

The 2022–23 season was the 119th in the history of Standard Liège and their 101st consecutive season in the top flight. The club participated in the Belgian Pro League and the Belgian Cup.

== Players ==
As of 3 February 2023

Note: Flags indicate national team as defined under FIFA eligibility rules; some limited exceptions apply. Players may hold more than one non-FIFA nationality.

No.	Pos.	Nation	Player
2	DF	BEL	Gilles Dewaele
5	DF	BEL	Alexandro Calut
6	DF	BEL	Noë Dussenne
8	MF	BIH	Gojko Cimirot
9	FW	BEL	Renaud Emond
10	FW	NED	Noah Ohio
11	FW	NOR	Aron Dønnum
13	DF	USA	Marlon Fossey
14	MF	COL	Steven Alzate (on loan from Brighton & Hove Albion)
16	GK	BEL	Arnaud Bodart
17	FW	ISR	Osher Davida
18	FW	BEL	Renaud Emond
20	MF	COD	Merveille Bokadi
21	MF	ITA	Filippo Melegoni (on loan from Genoa)

No.	Pos.	Nation	Player
22	MF	COD	William Balikwisha
25	DF	BEL	Ibe Hautekiet
28	FW	CRO	Stipe Perica
29	MF	BEL	Noah Mawete
30	GK	BEL	Laurent Henkinet
31	MF	BFA	Sacha Bansé
33	DF	BEL	Nathan Ngoy
34	DF	CYP	Konstantinos Laifis
38	DF	DEN	Jacob Barrett Laursen
40	GK	BEL	Matthieu Epolo
46	MF	LUX	Rayan Berberi
48	MF	BEL	Léandre Kuavita
51	DF	BEL	Lucas Noubi
61	FW	TUR	Cihan Çanak
77	MF	DEN	Philip Zinckernagel (on loan from Olympiacos)

=== Out on loan ===
Note: Flags indicate national team as defined under FIFA eligibility rules; some limited exceptions apply. Players may hold more than one non-FIFA nationality.

No.	Pos.	Nation	Player
7	FW	ROU	Denis Drăguș (on loan at Genoa until 30 June 2023)
13	MF	BEL	Joachim Van Damme (on loan at Beveren until 30 June 2023)

No.	Pos.	Nation	Player
23	FW	BFA	Abdoul Tapsoba (on loan at Sheriff Tiraspol until 30 June 2023)
24	MF	FRA	Mathieu Cafaro (on loan at Saint-Étienne until 30 June 2023)

== Transfers ==
=== In ===
Pos	Player	Transferred from	Fee	Date	Source
MF	(Norway) Aron Dønnum	(Norway) Vålerenga	End of loan	8 June 2022	
MF	(Israel) Eden Shamir	(Israel) Maccabi Tel Aviv	End of loan	12 June 2022	
FW	(Netherlands) Noah Ohio	(Germany) RB Leipzig	Undisclosed	14 July 2022	
MF	(Burkina Faso) Sacha Bansé	Gent	Free	15 July 2022	
DF	(Denmark) Jacob Barrett Laursen	(Germany) Arminia Bielefeld	Undisclosed	23 July 2022	
FW	(Israel) Osher Davida	(Israel) Hapoel Tel Aviv	Undisclosed	23 August 2022	
MF	(Italy) Filippo Melegoni	(Italy) Genoa	Loan	31 August 2022	
FW	(Croatia) Stipe Perica	(Israel) Maccabi Tel Aviv	€900,000	2 September 2022	
DF	(United States) Marlon Fossey	(England) Fulham	Undisclosed	3 September 2022	
MF	(Denmark) Philip Zinckernagel	(Greece) Olympiacos	Loan	7 September 2022	
MF	(Colombia) Steven Alzate	(England) Brighton & Hove Albion	Loan	9 September 2022	
DF	Ibe Hautekiet	Club Brugge	Undisclosed	31 January 2023	

=== Out ===
Pos	Player	Transferred to	Fee	Date	Source
MF	(Morocco) Mehdi Carcela	Unattached	Free	2 April 2022	
MF	Olivier Dumont	Sint-Truiden	Undisclosed	8 June 2022	
DF	(France) Niels Nkounkou	(England) Everton	End of loan	16 June 2022	
DF	(France) Mike Bettinger	(France) Le Mans	Free	16 June 2022	
MF	(Democratic Republic of the Congo) Samuel Bastien	(England) Burnley	Undisclosed	5 July 2022	
FW	(Democratic Republic of the Congo) Jackson Muleka	(Turkey) Beşiktaş	Undisclosed	7 July 2022	
MF	(France) Mathieu Cafaro	(France) Saint-Étienne	Loan	26 July 2022	
FW	(Morocco) Camil Mmaee	(Italy) Bologna	Undisclosed	29 July 2022	
FW	Mitchy Ntelo	Charleroi	Free	4 August 2022	
FW	(Uruguay) Felipe Avenatti	Kortrijk	Free	18 August 2022	
MF	Joachim Van Damme	Beveren	Loan	19 August 2022	
MF	(Serbia) Damjan Pavlović	(Croatia) Rijeka	Undisclosed	1 September 2022	
DF	(Mali) Moussa Sissako	(Russia) Sochi	Undisclosed	1 September 2022	
MF	(Israel) Eden Shamir	(Israel) Hapoel Be'er Sheva	Undisclosed	2 September 2022	
FW	(Romania) Denis Drăguș	(Italy) Genoa	Loan	26 January 2023	
MF	(Montenegro) Aleksandar Boljević	(Israel) Hapoel Tel Aviv	Undisclosed	26 January 2023	
MF	(Morocco) Selim Amallah	(Spain) Real Valladolid	Undisclosed	31 January 2023	
MF	Nicolas Raskin	(Scotland) Rangers	Undisclosed	31 January 2023	
DF	(Democratic Republic of the Congo) John Nekadio	Seraing	Undisclosed	1 February 2023	
FW	(Burkina Faso) Abdoul Tapsoba	(Moldova) Sheriff Tiraspol	Loan	3 February 2023	

== Pre-season and friendlies ==
Win Draw Loss Fixtures

29 June 2022 Friendly	Standard Liège (Belgium)	0–2	(Belgium) Sint-Truiden	Liège
13:30 CEST (UTC+2)		Report		Stadium: Stade Maurice Dufrasne

2 July 2022 Friendly	Standard Liège (Belgium)	1–2	(Belgium) RWDM	Angleur
13:30 CEST (UTC+2)	Emond 22'	Report	Ephestion 36'; Botella 39'	Stadium: SL16 Football Campus - Terrain 1

6 July 2022 Friendly	Go Ahead Eagles (Netherlands)	1–5	(Belgium) Standard Liège	Wageningen, Netherlands
17:00 CEST (UTC+2)	Stokkers 30'	Report	Dussenne 32'; Ghalidi 50', 90'; Noubi 57'; Shamir 77'

9 July 2022 Friendly	Standard Liège (Belgium)	0–1	(Greece) PAOK	Liège
16:00 CEST (UTC+2)		Report	Koutsias 37'	Stadium: Stade Maurice Dufrasne

16 July 2022 Friendly	Standard Liège (Belgium)	1–1	(Germany) Borussia Mönchengladbach	Liège
14:00 CEST (UTC+2)	Emond 49'	Report	Kramer 24'	Stadium: Stade Maurice Dufrasne

30 July 2022 Friendly	MVV (Netherlands)	Cancelled	(Belgium) Standard Liège	Netherlands
18:30 CEST (UTC+2)

4 December 2022 Friendly	Olympiacos (Greece)	3–3	(Belgium) Standard Liège	San Pedro de Alcántara, Spain
15:00 CET (UTC+1)	El-Arabi 58', 76'; Bakambu 74'	Report	Davida 19'; Ohio 64', 90'	Stadium: Marbella Football Center - Sur 1

8 December 2022 Friendly	Girona (Spain)	1–0	(Belgium) Standard Liège	Complejo Deportivo Arroyo Enmedio
11:00 CET (UTC+1)	Sáiz 48'	Report		Stadium: Estepona

8 December 2022 Friendly	Nice (France)	4–1	(Belgium) Standard Liège
16:00 CET (UTC+1)	Thuram 32'; Delort 61', 74'; Rosario 80'	Report	Drăguș 71'

14 December 2022 Friendly	Standard Liège (Belgium)	0–1	(France) Valenciennes	Liège
14:00 CET (UTC+1)		Report	Kaba 80'	Stadium: Stade Maurice Dufrasne

30 December 2022 Friendly	Juventus (Italy)	1–1	(Belgium) Standard Liège	Turin, Italy
	Soulé 56' (pen.)	Report	Danilo 32' (o.g.)	Stadium: Juventus Stadium; Attendance: 9,096; Referee: Maria Sole Ferrieri Caputi (Italy)

== Competitions ==
=== Overall record ===
Competition	First match	Last match	Starting round	Final position	Record							
Competition	First match	Last match	Starting round	Final position	Pld	W	D	L	GF	GA	GD	Win %
Belgian Pro League	22 July 2022	23 April 2023	Matchday 1	6th	34	16	7	11	58	45	+13	47.06
Belgian Pro League Play-off II	29 April 2023	3 June 2023	2nd	3rd	6	0	2	4	4	14	−10	0.00
Belgian Cup	8 November 2022	20 December 2022	Sixth round	Seventh Round	2	1	0	1	1	4	−3	50.00
Total					42	17	9	16	63	63	+0	40.48

Source: Soccerway

=== Belgian Pro League ===
==== League table ====
Pos	Team	Pld	W	D	L	GF	GA	GD	Pts	Qualification or relegation
4	Club Brugge	34	16	11	7	61	36	+25	59	Qualification for the Play-offs I
5	Gent (U)	34	16	8	10	64	38	+26	56	Qualification for the Play-offs II
6	Standard Liège	34	16	7	11	58	45	+13	55	Qualification for the Play-offs II
7	Westerlo	34	14	9	11	61	53	+8	51	Qualification for the Play-offs II
8	Cercle Brugge	34	13	11	10	50	46	+4	50	Qualification for the Play-offs II

Source: Jupiler Pro League (in Dutch), Soccerway
Rules for classification: 1) Points; 2) Matches won; 3) Goal difference; 4) Goals scored; 5) Away matches won; 6) Away goal difference; 7) Away goals scored; 8) Play-off.
(U) Play-off II winner

==== Results summary ====
Overall								Home						Away					
Pld	W	D	L	GF	GA	GD	Pts	W	D	L	GF	GA	GD	W	D	L	GF	GA	GD
34	16	7	11	58	45	+13	55	10	3	4	34	17	+17	6	4	7	24	28	−4

Source: Jupiler Pro League

==== Results by round ====
Round	1	2	3	4	5	6	7	8	9	10	11	12	13	14	15	16	17	18	19	20	21	22	23	24	25	26	27	28	29	30	31	32	33	34
Ground	H	A	H	A	H	A	H	A	H	H	A	H	A	H	A	A	H	A	H	A	H	A	H	A	H	A	A	H	A	H	A	H	H	A
Result	D	L	W	L	L	W	W	W	W	L	W	W	L	W	W	L	L	D	D	D	W	L	W	D	L	W	D	W	L	D	W	W	W	L
Position	9	16	9	12	14	11	9	6	5	6	6	5	5	6	5	6	7	6	6	6	6	6	6	6	6	6	7	6	7	7	6	6	6	6

Source: Jupiler Pro League
A = Away; H = Home; W = Win; D = Draw; L = Loss

==== Matches ====
The league fixtures were announced on 22 June 2022.

22 July 2022 1	Standard Liège	2–2	Gent	Liège
20:45 CEST (UTC+2)	Amallah 34' (pen.); Dussenne 89'	Report	Tissoudali 60'; Lemajić 79'	Stadium: Stade Maurice Dufrasne; Attendance: 18,918; Referee: Lawrence Visser

31 July 2022 2	Genk	3–1	Standard Liège	Genk
13:30 CEST (UTC+2)	Dessers 5', 29'; Trésor 16'	Report	Drăguș 24'	Stadium: Cegeka Arena; Attendance: 15,134; Referee: Bram Van Driessche

7 August 2022 3	Standard Liège	2–0	Cercle Brugge	Liège
13:30 CEST (UTC+2)	Amallah 31', 50'	Report		Stadium: Stade Maurice Dufrasne; Attendance: 18,286; Referee: Erik Lambrechts

13 August 2022 4	Westerlo	4–2	Standard Liège	Westerlo
16:00 CEST (UTC+2)	Vetokele 38'; Nene 50'; Barrett 73' (o.g.); Foster 90+1'	Report	Tapsoba 63'; Dussenne 90'	Stadium: Het Kuipje; Attendance: 6,000; Referee: Jasper Vergoote

21 August 2022 5	Standard Liège	1–3	OH Leuven	Liège
18:30 CEST (UTC+2)	Emond 90+1'	Report	Þorsteinsson 34'; Nsingi 45'; Al-Taamari 75'	Stadium: Stade Maurice Dufrasne; Attendance: 18,930; Referee: Nathan Verboomen

28 August 2022 6	Kortrijk	0–1	Standard Liège	Kortrijk
16:00 CEST (UTC+2)		Report	Amallah 83'	Stadium: Guldensporen Stadion; Attendance: 7,404; Referee: Lothar D'hondt

3 September 2022 7	Standard Liège	1–0	Oostende	Liège
20:45 CEST (UTC+2)	Drăguș 67'	Report		Stadium: Stade Maurice Dufrasne; Attendance: 18,274; Referee: Bram Van Driessche

9 September 2022 8	Sint-Truiden	1–2	Standard Liège	Sint-Truiden
20:45 CEST (UTC+2)	Brüls 63' (pen.)	Report	Drăguș 26'; Leistner 43' (o.g.)	Stadium: Stayen; Attendance: 6,048; Referee: Alexandre Boucaut

18 September 2022 9	Standard Liège	3–0	Club Brugge	Liège
18:30 CEST (UTC+2)	Zinckernagel 30', 64'; Balikwisha 90+2'	Report		Stadium: Stade Maurice Dufrasne; Attendance: 25,893; Referee: Jasper Vergoote

30 September 2022 10	Standard Liège	0–2	Seraing	Liège
20:45 CEST (UTC+2)		Report	Mbow 9'; Poaty 54'	Stadium: Stade Maurice Dufrasne; Attendance: 20,969; Referee: Jan Boterberg

9 October 2022 11	Sporting Charleroi	0–1	Standard Liège	Charleroi
18:30 CET (UTC+1)		Report	Tchatchoua 45+2' (o.g.)	Stadium: Stade du Pays de Charleroi; Attendance: 11,477; Referee: Nathan Verboomen

16 October 2022 12	Standard Liège	3–0	Antwerp	Liège
13:30 CET (UTC+1)	Balikwisha 2'; Drăguș 4'; Çanak 9'	Report		Stadium: Stade Maurice Dufrasne; Attendance: 21,607; Referee: Lother D'hondt

19 October 2022 13	Mechelen	2–0	Standard Liège	Mechelen
20:45 CET (UTC+1)	Vanlerberghe 71'; Ngoy 74'	Report		Stadium: AFAS Stadion; Attendance: 10,890; Referee: Jasper Vergoote

23 October 2022 14	Standard Liège	3–1	Anderlecht	Liège
CET (UTC+1)		Report		Stadium: Stade Maurice Dufrasne

29 October 2022 15	Zulte Waregem	0–3	Standard Liège	Waregem
16:00 CET (UTC+1)		Report	Dussenne 80' (pen.); Perica 87', 90+6'	Stadium: Elindus Arena; Attendance: 7,634; Referee: Jonathan Lardot

5 November 2022 16	Eupen	2–0	Standard Liège	Eupen
20:45 CET (UTC+1)	Peeters 78' (pen.); Gassama 90+1'	Report		Stadium: Stadion am Kehrweg; Attendance: 7,101; Referee: Wesli De Cremer

13 November 2022 17	Standard Liège	2–3	Union SG	Liège
16:00 CET (UTC+1)	Dussenne 53' (pen.); Zinckernagel 90+6' (pen.)	Report	Vanzeir 23'; Nieuwkoop 87'; Burgess 65'	Stadium: Stade Maurice Dufrasne; Attendance: 24,522; Referee: Lawrence Visser

23 December 2022 18	Gent	0–0	Standard Liège	Ghent
20:30 CEST (UTC+2)		Report		Stadium: Ghelamco Arena; Referee: Erik Lambrechts

6 January 2023 19	Standard Liège	1–1	Sint-Truiden	Liège
20:45	Perica 90+2'	Report	Hayashi 61'	Stadium: Stade Maurice Dufrasne; Referee: Kevin Van Damme

14 January 2023 20	Seraing	1–1	Standard Liège	Seraing
16:00	Balikwisha 17' (o.g.)	Report	Dønnum 41'	Stadium: Stade du Pairay; Referee: Bram Van Driessche

17 January 2023 21	Standard Liège	2–0	Mechelen	Liège
20:45	Laifis 45+1'; Ohio 85'	Report		Stadium: Stade Maurice Dufrasne; Referee: Jonathan Lardot

22 January 2023 22	Antwerp	4–1	Standard Liège	Antwerp
13:30 CEST	Janssen 8', 87'; Muja 29'; Bokadi 42' (o.g.)	Report	Alzate 40'	Stadium: Bosuilstadion; Referee: Jan Boterberg

27 January 2023 23	Standard Liège	3–1	Eupen	Liège
20:45 CEST	Balikwisha 31'; Zinckernagel 35'; Perica 59'	Report	Charles-Cook 11'	Stadium: Stade Maurice Dufrasne; Referee: Nathan Verboomen

4 February 2023 24	Cercle Brugge	1–1	Standard Liège	Bruges
16:00 CEST	Ueda 90+1'	Report	Zinckernagel 81' (pen.)	Stadium: Jan Breydel Stadium; Referee: Bert Put

12 February 2023 25	Standard Liège	0–2	Kortrijk	Liège
18:30		Report	Wasinski 67'; Selemani 84' (pen.)	Stadium: Stade Maurice Dufrasne; Referee: Lothar D'hondt

18 February 2023 26	Union SG	2–4	Standard Liège	Forest
20:45	Vertessen 22'; Boniface 66'	Report	Zinckernagel 20'; Alzate 25'; Balikwisha 85'; Dønnum 90+8'	Stadium: Joseph Marien Stadium; Referee: Jasper Vergoote

26 February 2023 27	Anderlecht	2–2	Standard Liège	Anderlecht
18:30	Slimani 34' (pen.), 38'	Report	Ohio 14'; Sardella 68' (o.g.)	Stadium: Lotto Park; Referee: Jonathan Lardot

4 March 2023 28	Standard Liège	2–0	Westerlo	Liège
20:45	Dønnum 37'; Balikwisha 72'	Report		Stadium: Stade Maurice Dufrasne; Referee: Jan Boterberg

12 March 2023 29	Club Brugge	2–0	Standard Liège	Bruges
14:30	Jutglà 61'; Meijer 86'	Report		Stadium: Jan Breydel Stadium; Referee: Lawrence Visser

18 March 2023 30	Standard Liège	2–2	Zulte Waregem	Liège
20:45	Fossey 14'; Dussenne 39'	Report	Fadera 76'; Ndour 85'	Stadium: Stade Maurice Dufrasne; Referee: Jan Boterberg

1 April 2023 31	Oostende	1–3	Standard Liège	Ostend
20:45	Arase 40'	Report	Ohio 8', 11'; Fossey 19'	Stadium: Diaz Arena; Referee: Kevin Van Damme

9 April 2023 32	Standard Liège	2–0	Genk	Liège
18:30 CEST	Zinckernagel 33', 39' (pen.)	Report		Stadium: Stade Maurice Dufrasne; Referee: Nicolas Laforge

14 April 2023 33	Standard Liège	3–1	Charleroi	Liège
20:45 CEST	Ohio 14'; Fossey 82'; Emond 90+1'	Report	Nkuba 86'	Stadium: Stade Maurice Dufrasne; Referee: Lawrence Visser

23 April 2023 34	OH Leuven	3–2	Standard Liège	Leuven
18:30 CEST	Opoku 43'; Þorsteinsson 63' (pen.), 67'	Report	Bokadi 55'; Melegoni 90+1'	Stadium: Den Dreef; Referee: Lothar D'hondt

==== Play-offs II ====
Points obtained during the regular season were halved (and rounded up) before the start of the play-offs. Gent and Standard started on 28 points, Westerlo on 26, and Cercle Brugge on 25. As the points of Standard and Westerlo were rounded up, in case of ties they would always be ranked below the team (or teams) they are tied with. The deciding factor after that would be finishing position in the regular season.

Pos	Team	Pld	W	D	L	GF	GA	GD	Pts	Qualification or relegation	GNT	CER	STA	WES
1	Gent (F)	6	5	1	0	17	6	+11	44	Qualification for the Europa Conference League second qualifying round	—	2–2	3–1	3–1
2	Cercle Brugge	6	3	2	1	13	9	+4	36		0–4	—	0–0	2–0
3	Standard Liège	6	0	2	4	4	14	−10	30 (Note: Tied on Points and Points without half points added due to rounding. Regular Season finishing position: Standard Liège 6, Westerlo 7)		1–2	0–4	—	2–2
4	Westerlo	6	1	1	4	10	15	−5	30		1–3	3–5	3–0	—

Source: Jupiler Pro League (in Dutch), Soccerway
Legend: Blue = home team win; Yellow = draw; Red = away team win.
Rules for classification: 1) Points; 2) Points without (possible) half points added due to rounding; 3) Regular season finishing position.
(F) Play-off II winner
Notes:

29 April 2023 1	Cercle Brugge	0–0	Standard Liège	Bruges
18:15 CEST		Report		Stadium: Jan Breydel Stadium; Referee: Nathan Verboomen

6 May 2023 2	Standard Liège	1–2	Gent	Liège
20:45 CEST	Alzate 56'	Report	Orban 31'; Cuypers 61'	Stadium: Stade Maurice Dufrasne; Referee: Jan Boterberg

13 May 2023 3	Standard Liège	2–2	Westerlo	Liège
20:45 CEST	Zinckernagel 9'; Emond 76'	Report	Jordanov 90+2'; Van den Keybus 90+5'	Stadium: Stade Maurice Dufrasne; Referee: Nicolas Laforge

20 May 2023 4	Westerlo	3–0	Standard Liège	Westerlo
18:15 CEST	De Cuyper 4'; Nene 30', 81'	Report		Stadium: Het Kuipje; Referee: Bert Put

27 May 2023 5	Standard Liège	0–4	Cercle Brugge	Liège
20:45 CEST		Report	Marcelin 7'; Denkey 51'; Francis 64'; Ueda 90+2'	Stadium: Stade Maurice Dufrasne; Referee: Kevin Van Damme

3 June 2023 6	Gent	3–1	Standard Liège	Ghent
20:30 CEST	Cuypers 23', 43', 79' (pen.)	Report	Balikwisha 11'	Stadium: Ghelamco Arena; Referee: Lothar D'hondt

=== Belgian Cup ===
8 November 2022 Sixth round	Dender	0–1	Standard Liège	Denderleeuw
20:30 CET		Report	Balikwisha 74'	Stadium: Van Roystadion; Referee: Michael Allaerts

20 December 2022 Seventh round	Antwerp	4–0	Standard Liège	Antwerp
20:45 CET	Bataille 17'; Frey 56'; Muja 60'; Stengs 80'	Report		Stadium: Bosuilstadion
