= 2023–24 Standard Liège season =

Standard Liège
2023–24 season
- Manager: Carl Hoefkens (until 31 December); Ivan Leko (from 4 January)
- Stadium: Stade Maurice Dufrasne
- Belgian Pro League: 10th
- Europe Play-offs: 5th
- Belgian Cup: Eighth round
- Top goalscorer: League: Wilfried Kanga (12); All: Wilfried Kanga (12)
- Average home league attendance: 16,291
Home colours	Away colours	Third colours

The 2023–24 season was Standard de Liège's 126th season in existence and 64th consecutive in the Belgian Pro League. They also competed in the Belgian Cup.

== Players ==
=== First-team squad ===
As of 1 February 2024

Note: Flags indicate national team as defined under FIFA eligibility rules; some limited exceptions apply. Players may hold more than one non-FIFA nationality.

No.	Pos.	Nation	Player
2	DF	BEL	Gilles Dewaele
3	DF	BEL	Nathan Ngoy
4	DF	BEL	Zinho Vanheusden (on loan from Inter Milan)
5	DF	ENG	Jonathan Panzo (on loan from Nottingham Forest)
6	MF	JPN	Hayao Kawabe
8	MF	NIR	Isaac Price
9	FW	ITA	Kelvin Yeboah (on loan from Genoa)
11	FW	ITA	Seydou Fini (on loan from Genoa)
13	DF	USA	Marlon Fossey
14	FW	CIV	Wilfried Kanga (on loan from Hertha Berlin)
15	DF	CIV	Souleyman Doumbia
16	GK	BEL	Arnaud Bodart
17	MF	COL	Steven Alzate (on loan from Brighton & Hove Albion)

No.	Pos.	Nation	Player
18	MF	GHA	Kamal Sowah (on loan from Club Brugge)
19	MF	MLI	Moussa Djenepo
20	MF	COD	Merveille Bokadi
22	MF	COD	William Balikwisha
24	MF	AUS	Aiden O'Neill
25	DF	BEL	Ibe Hautekiet
28	FW	CRO	Stipe Perica
30	GK	BEL	Laurent Henkinet
34	DF	CYP	Konstantinos Laifis
40	GK	BEL	Matthieu Epolo
46	MF	LUX	Rayan Berberi
51	DF	BEL	Lucas Noubi
61	MF	TUR	Cihan Çanak

== Transfers ==
=== In ===
Pos.	Player	Transferred from	Fee	Date	Source
MF	(Australia) Aiden O'Neill	(Australia) Melbourne City	Free	1 July 2023	
MF	(England) Romaine Mundle	(England) Tottenham Hotspur U21	Free	1 July 2023	
FW	(Ivory Coast) Wilfried Kanga	(Germany) Hertha BSC	Loan	7 August 2023	
DF	(England) Jonathan Panzo	(England) Nottingham Forest	Loan	30 January 2024	
FW	(Italy) Kelvin Yeboah	(Italy) Genoa	Loan	1 February 2024	
FW	(Italy) Seydou Fini	(Italy) Genoa	Loan	1 February 2024	

=== Out ===
Pos.	Player	Transferred to	Fee	Date	Source
DF	(Belgium) Noë Dussenne	(Switzerland) Lausanne-Sport	Free	1 July 2023	
MF	(France) Mathieu Cafaro	(France) Saint-Étienne	€500,000	1 July 2023	
MF	(Japan) Koji Miyoshi	(England) Birmingham City	Free	1 July 2023	
MF	(England) Romaine Mundle	(England) Sunderland	£2,500,000	1 February 2024	

== Pre-season and friendlies ==
12 October 2023 Friendly	Standard Liège (Belgium)	1–0	(Belgium) Seraing	Liège
12:00	Mateta			Stadium: Stade Maurice Dufrasne

25 July 2023 Friendly	Metz (France)	2–2	(Belgium) Standard Liège	Marly
15:00 UTC+2	Maziz 19'; Camara 83' (pen.)		Berberi 74'; Emond 90'	Stadium: Centre d’entraînement de Frescaty

9 January 2024 Friendly	Borussia Dortumnd (Germany)	3–3	(Belgium) Standard Liège	Marbella, Spain
11:00 CET (UTC+1)	Meunier 15'; Papadopoulos 70'; Bamba 89'		Kanga 36', 59'; Perica 77'	Stadium: Marbella Football Center

12 January 2024 Friendly	Luzern (Switzerland)	1–2	(Belgium) Standard Liège	San Pedro de Alcántara, Spain
10:30 CET (UTC+1)	Meyer (penalty missed) 5'; Chader 7'		Kanga 14'; Ohio 84'	Stadium: Marbella Football Center - Sur 1

== Competitions ==
=== Overall record ===
Competition	First match	Last match	Starting round	Final position	Record							
Competition	First match	Last match	Starting round	Final position	Pld	W	D	L	GF	GA	GD	Win %
Belgian Pro League Regular season	30 July 2023	16 March 2024	Matchday 1	10th	30	8	10	12	33	41	−8	26.67
Champions' Play-offs	29 March 2024	25 May 2024	Matchday 1		9	0	5	4	12	22	−10	0.00
Belgian Cup	1 November 2023	7 December 2023	Seventh round	Eighth round	2	1	0	1	5	2	+3	50.00
Total					41	9	15	17	50	65	−15	21.95

Source: Soccerway

=== Belgian Pro League ===
==== Regular season ====
Pos	Team	Pld	W	D	L	GF	GA	GD	Pts	Qualification or relegation
8	Mechelen	30	13	6	11	39	34	+5	45	Qualification for the Europe play-offs
9	Sint-Truiden	30	10	10	10	35	46	−11	40	Qualification for the Europe play-offs
10	Standard Liège	30	8	10	12	33	41	−8	34	Qualification for the Europe play-offs
11	Westerlo	30	7	9	14	42	54	−12	30	Qualification for the Europe play-offs
12	OH Leuven	30	7	8	15	34	47	−13	29	Qualification for the Europe play-offs

Source: Jupiler Pro League (in Dutch), Soccerway
Rules for classification: 1) Points; 2) Matches won; 3) Goal difference; 4) Goals scored; 5) Away matches won; 6) Away goal difference; 7) Away goals scored; 8) Play-off.

==== Results summary ====
Overall								Home						Away					
Pld	W	D	L	GF	GA	GD	Pts	W	D	L	GF	GA	GD	W	D	L	GF	GA	GD
30	8	10	12	33	41	−8	34	6	5	4	18	12	+6	2	5	8	15	29	−14

Source: Worldfootball

==== Results by round ====
Round	1	2	3	4	5	6	7	8	9	10	11	12	13	14	15	16	17	18	19	20	21
Ground	A	H	A	H	A	H	A	H	A	H	H	A	H	A	H	A	A	H	A	H	H
Result	L	L	D	L	D	D	W	D	W	W	W	L	D	L	W	L	D	D	L	D	L
Position	13	16	12	14	13	14	12	13	11	8	8	8	8	9	8	9	9	9	10	9	10

Source: Worldfootball
A = Away; H = Home; W = Win; D = Draw; L = Loss

==== Matches ====
The league fixtures were unveiled on 22 June 2023.

29 July 2023 1	Sint-Truiden	1–0	Standard Liège	Sint-Truiden
19:15	Godeau (yellow card) 57'; Koita 86'	Report	Barrett (yellow card) 26'	Stadium: Stayen; Referee: Jasper Vergoote

4 August 2023 2	Standard Liège	0–1	Union Saint-Gilloise	Liège
20:45	Balikwisha (yellow card) 5' (yellow-red card) 36'; Dønnum (yellow card) 62'	Report	Eckert 21'; Lynen (yellow card) 57'	Stadium: Stade Maurice Dufrasne; Referee: Jonathan Lardot

13 August 2023 3	Charleroi	1–1	Standard Liège	Charleroi
18:30	Ilaimaharitra (yellow card) 29' (red card) 90', (goal) 90' (pen.); Marcq (yellow card) 71'; Bager (yellow card) 90'		Dønnum (yellow card) 29'; Drăguș 31'; Carl Hoefkens (yellow card) 67'; Ngoy (red card) 88'; Vanheusden (yellow card) 90'	Stadium: Stade du Pays de Charleroi; Referee: Nicolas Laforge

19 August 2023 4	Standard Liège	0–1	Cercle Brugge	Liège
16:00	Drăguș (yellow card) 44'; Ngoy (yellow card) 57'	Report	Leonardo Lopes (yellow card) 45+2'; Minda 76'; Popović (yellow card) 78'	Stadium: Stade Maurice Dufrasne; Attendance: 16,860; Referee: Jasper Vergoote

26 August 2023 5	Kortrijk	1–1	Standard Liège	Kortrijk
20:45 CEST	Davies 24'	Report	Kanga (yellow card) 17'; Kawabe 73'; Vanheusden (yellow card) 90+1'	Stadium: Guldensporen Stadion; Attendance: 5,813; Referee: Nathan Verboomen

2 September 2023 6	Standard Liège	1–1	RWD Molenbeek	Liège
20:45 CEST	Ngoy (yellow card) 20'; Kanga 25'	Report	Gueye 20'; Zakaria El Ouahdi (yellow card) 35'; De Sart (yellow card) 65'; Abe (yellow card) 80'	Stadium: Stade Maurice Dufrasne; Attendance: 20,500; Referee: Kevin Van Damme

17 September 2023 7	Eupen	1–3	Standard Liège	Eupen
13:30 CEST	Finnbogason 80'; Christie-Davies (yellow card) 88'	Report	Hayden (yellow card) 22'; Alzate (yellow card) 43' (yellow-red card) 90+13'; Kanga 45+3'; Kawabe 45+5' (yellow card) 58'; Sowah 75'	Stadium: Kehrwegstadion; Attendance: 6,615; Referee: Jonathan Lardot

22 September 2023 8	Standard Liège	0–0	Westerlo	Liège
20:45 CEST		Report	Reynolds (yellow card) 66'; Bos (yellow card) 68'; Van Eenoo (yellow card) 74'	Stadium: Stade Maurice Dufrasne; Attendance: 18,504; Referee: Bert Put

30 September 2023 9	OH Leuven	1–2	Standard Liège	Heverlee
18:15 CEST	Mendyl 65'; Nsingi (yellow card) 76'; Pletinckx (yellow card) 78'	Report	Kanga 44'; Ngoy (yellow card) 78'; Sowah 81'	Stadium: King Power at Den Dreef; Attendance: 7,216; Referee: Lothar D'Hondt

8 October 2023 10	Standard Liège	2–1	Club Brugge	Liège
13:30 CEST	Bokadi 11'; Hayden (yellow card) 40'; Djenepo (yellow card) 45+3'; Kanga (yellow card) 74'; Price 90'; Ohio (yellow card) 90+7'	Report	Skov Olsen (yellow card) 45+3' (goal) 85'	Stadium: Stade Maurice Dufrasne; Attendance: 25,853; Referee: Erik Lambrechts

22 October 2023 11	Standard Liège	3–2	Anderlecht	Liège
18:30 CEST	Ngoy (yellow card) 50' (goal) 61'; Alzate 52'; Kawabe 55'; Price (yellow card) 90+6'	Report	Dolberg 18'; Dreyer 24'; Hazard (yellow card) 60'; Debast (yellow card) 90+1'; Schmeichel (yellow card) 90+2'	Stadium: Stade Maurice Dufrasne; Attendance: 26,864; Referee: Jonathan Lardot

29 October 2023 12	Gent	3–1	Standard Liège	Liège
18:30 CEST	Torunarigha (yellow card) 27'; Tissoudali 33' 40'; Cuypers 36'; Samoise (yellow card) 80'	Report	Vanheusden (yellow card) 47'; Hayden (yellow card) 52'; Kanga 67'	Stadium: Stade Maurice Dufrasne; Attendance: 16,679; Referee: Nicolas Laforge

5 November 2023 13	Standard Liège	1–1	Mechelen	Liège
16:00	Kawabe 22'; Vanheusden (yellow card) 90+2'	Report	Lauberbach (yellow card) 14'; Konaté (yellow card) 86'; Schoofs 89'; Cobbaut (yellow card) 90+1'; Coucke (yellow card) 90+3'	Stadium: Stade Maurice Dufrasne; Attendance: 19,617; Referee: Kevin Van Damme

11 November 2023 14	Antwerp	6–0	Standard Liège	Antwerp
16:00	Janssen 4' 14' (pen.); Ekkelenkamp 33'; Muja 41'; Bataille (yellow card) 49'; Ilenikhena 74'; De Laet (yellow card) 79'; Balikwisha 86'; Van Den Bosch (yellow card) 89'	Report	Vanheusden (yellow card) 38'; Djenepo (yellow card) 78'	Stadium: Bosuilstadion; Attendance: 14,000; Referee: Jonathan Lardot

25 November 2023 15	Standard Liège	1–0	Genk	Liège
20:45	Kawabe 66'; Ngoy (yellow card) 86'; Dewaele (yellow card) 90+6'	Report	Heynen (yellow card) 90+2'; Galarza (yellow card) 90+6'	Stadium: Stade Maurice Dufrasne; Attendance: 21,113; Referee: Wesli De Cremer

3 December 2023 16	Club Brugge	2–0	Standard Liège	Brugge
18:30	Igor Thiago 3'; Vetlesen (yellow card) 31'; Zinckernagel 55'; Buchanan (yellow card) 67'	Report	Noubi (yellow card) 29'; Vanheusden (yellow card) 83'	Stadium: Jan Breydel Stadium; Attendance: 19,471; Referee: Jasper Vergoote

10 December 2023 17	Anderlecht	2–2	Standard Liège	Anderlecht
18:30	Dreyer 21' (yellow card) 74' (goal) 77' (pen.); Debast (yellow card) 75'	Report	Kawabe (yellow card) 36' (goal) 45+2'; Kanga 55'; O'Neill (yellow card) 72'; Ngoy (yellow card) 73'	Stadium: Lotto Park; Attendance: 20,000; Referee: Jonathan Lardot

16 December 2023 18	Standard Liège	0–0	Sporting Charleroi	Liège
20:45	O'Neill (yellow card) 42'	Report	Rogelj (yellow card) 30'	Stadium: Stade Maurice Dufrasne; Attendance: 20,000; Referee: Lothar D'Hondt

20 December 2023 19	Mechelen	3–0	Standard Liège	Mechelen
20:45	Bassette 35'; Bates (yellow card) 51'; Mrabti 67'; Schoofs (yellow card) 82'; Hairemans 90+3' (pen.)	Report	Bokadi (red card) 12'	Stadium: AFAS Stadion; Attendance: 13,466; Referee: Jan Boterberg

27 December 2023 20	Standard Liège	1–1	Sint-Truiden	Liège
18:30	Çanak (yellow card) 80'; Kanga 90+8' (pen.)	Report	Van Helden (yellow card) 47'; Fujita 86'; Koita (yellow card) 88'; Janssens (yellow card) 90+6'	Stadium: Stade Maurice Dufrasne; Attendance: 19,517; Referee: Erik Lambrechts

20 January 2024 21	Standard Liège	0–1	Kortrijk	Liège
18:15		Report	Kana (yellow card) 34'; Avenatti 45'	Stadium: Stade Maurice Dufrasne; Attendance: 18,978; Referee: Bert Put

26 January 2024 22	Cercle Brugge	1–1	Standard Liège	Brugge
20:45	Utkus (yellow card) 65'; Somers 88'; Van der Bruggen (yellow card) 90+6'	Report	Djenepo (yellow card) 45+1'; Fossey 79'	Stadium: Jan Breydel Stadium; Attendance: 4,388; Referee: Jonathan Lardot

31 January 2024 23	Standard Liège	0–1	Antwerp	Liège
21:00		Report		Stadium: Stade Maurice Dufrasne; Referee: Bram Van Driessche

3 February 2024 24	RWDM	2–2	Standard Liège	Molenbeek-Saint-Jean
16:00		Report		Stadium: Edmond Machtens Stadium; Referee: Bert Put

10 February 2024 25	Standard Liège	1–0	OH Leuven	Liège
16:00		Report		Stadium: Stade Maurice Dufrasne; Referee: Wesli De Cremer

16 February 2024 26	Westerlo	2–1	Standard Liège	Westerlo
20:45		Report		Stadium: Het Kuipje; Referee: Jasper Vergoote

25 February 2024 27	Union Saint-Gilloise	2–1	Standard Liège	Brussels
18:30	Nilsson 35' (pen.); Eckert 38'	Report	Djenepo 50'	Stadium: Joseph Marien Stadium; Referee: Nicolas Laforge

2 March 2024 28	Standard Liège	4–2	Gent	Liège
20:45	Kanga 45+7' (pen.); Yeboah 55', 65'; Kawabe 62'	Report	Tissoudali 14'; Fortuna (red card) 18'; Samoise 80'	Stadium: Stade Maurice Dufrasne; Attendance: 18,495; Referee: Wesli De Cremer

10 March 2024 29	Genk	1–0	Standard Liège	Genk
13:30	Ait El Hadj 51'	Report		Stadium: Cegeka Arena; Referee: Jonathan Lardot

16 March 2024 30	Standard Liège	4–0	Eupen	Liège
18:15	Kanga 9'; Balikwisha 40'; Yeboah 82'; Charles-Cook 89' (o.g.)	Report		Stadium: Stade Maurice Dufrasne; Attendance: 14,855; Referee: Nathan Verboomen

==== Results summary ====
Overall								Home						Away					
Pld	W	D	L	GF	GA	GD	Pts	W	D	L	GF	GA	GD	W	D	L	GF	GA	GD
8	0	5	3	10	19	−9	5	0	3	1	2	5	−3	0	2	2	8	14	−6

Last updated: 18 May 2024.
Source: Worldfootball

==== Results by round ====
Round	1	2	3	4	5	6	7	8	9	10
Ground	A	H	A	A	H	H	A	H	H	A
Result	L	D	D	D	D	D	L	P	L	
Position	4	4	5	5	5	5	5			

Updated to match(es) played on 18 May 2024. Source: Worldfootball
A = Away; H = Home; W = Win; D = Draw; L = Loss

==== Matches ====
29 March 2024 1	Gent	5–1	Standard Liège	Ghent
20:45	Fernandez-Pardo 23'; Gandelman 53'; Gerkens 72'; Kandouss 79'; Tissoudali 83'	Report	De Sart 28' (o.g.)	Stadium: Ghelamco Arena; Attendance: 11,341; Referee: Nathan Verboomen

6 April 2024 2	Standard Liège	0–0	OH Leuven	Liège
18:15		Report		Stadium: Stade Maurice Dufrasne; Referee: Bert Put

12 April 2024 3	Sint-Truiden	3–3	Standard Liège	Sint-Truiden
20:45		Report		Stadium: Stayen; Referee: Wesli De Cremer

20 April 2024 4	Westerlo	3–3	Standard Liège	Westerlo
18:15	Frigan 29'; Stassin 49'; Yow 59' (pen.); Reynolds (yellow card) 62'	Report	Kanga 22'; Kawabe (yellow card) 73'; Alzate 78'; Laifis 90+4'	Stadium: Het Kuipje; Referee: Simon Bourdeaud'Hui

23 April 2024 5	Standard Liège	0–0	Mechelen	Liège
20:30		Report		Stadium: Stade Maurice Dufrasne; Referee: Michiel Allaerts

27 April 2024 6	Standard Liège	1–1	Sint-Truiden	Liège
18:15		Report		Stadium: Stade Maurice Dufrasne; Referee: Jan Boterberg

5 May 2024 7	OH Leuven	3–1	Standard Liège	Leuven
16:00	Maziz 47'; Nsingi 74'; Dagur Þorsteinsson 90+3'	Report	Yeboah 43'	Stadium: Den Dreef; Referee: Wim Smet

10 May 2024 8	Standard Liège	v	Westerlo	Liège
				Stadium: Stade Maurice Dufrasne

18 May 2024 9	Standard Liège	1–4	Gent	Liège
20:45	Yeboah 17'	Report	Fernandez-Pardo 10', 66'; Depoitre 80', 87'	Stadium: Stade Maurice Dufrasne; Referee: Kevin Van Damme

25 May 2024 10	Mechelen	3–2	Standard Liège	Mechelen
20:30	Lauberbach 15', 17', 90'; Bolingoli (yellow card) 68'; Foulon (yellow card) 90+6'	Report	Lawrence 51'; Benjdida 84'	Stadium: AFAS Stadion; Referee: Wim Smet

=== Belgian Cup ===
1 November 2023 Round of 32	Standard Liège	5–0	Harelbeke	Liège
20:30				Stadium: Stade Maurice Dufrasne

7 December 2023 Eighth round	Anderlecht	2–0	Standard Liège	Anderlecht
20:30 CET	Stroeykens 31' (yellow card) 69'; Dreyer 51'; Sardella (yellow card) 53'; Ashimeru (yellow card) 85'	Report	Alzate (yellow card) 27'; Price (red card) 59'; Vanheusden (yellow card) 90+4'	Stadium: Lotto Park; Attendance: 22,200; Referee: Bram Van Driessche
