= 2021–22 Standard Liège season =

Standard Liège
2021–22 season
- Chairman: Bruno Venanzi
- Manager: Mbaye Leye (until 5 October); Luka Elsner (from 7 October until 20 April)
- Stadium: Stade Maurice Dufrasne
- Belgian First Division A: 14th
- Belgian Cup: Quarter-finals
- Top goalscorer: League: Denis Drăguș (6); All: Denis Drăguș (6)
- Highest home attendance: 24,000 (vs. Anderlecht, 19 September 2021)
- Lowest home attendance: 0
- Biggest win: 2–0 (vs. Eupen, 26 January 2022)
- Biggest defeat: 0–4 (vs. Union Saint-Gilloise, 28 August 2021)
Home colours	Away colours	Third colours

The 2021–22 season was the 118th season in the existence of Standard Liège and the club's 100th consecutive season in the top flight of Belgian football. In addition to the domestic league, Standard Liège participated in this season's edition of the Belgian Cup.

== Players ==
=== First-team squad ===
Note: Flags indicate national team as defined under FIFA eligibility rules; some limited exceptions apply. Players may hold more than one non-FIFA nationality.

No.	Pos.	Nation	Player
2	DF	BEL	Gilles Dewaele
4	DF	SRB	Damjan Pavlović
5	DF	MLI	Moussa Sissako
6	DF	BEL	Noë Dussenne
7	FW	ROU	Denis Drăguș
8	MF	BIH	Gojko Cimirot
10	MF	MAR	Mehdi Carcela
13	MF	BEL	Joachim Van Damme
14	DF	FRA	Niels Nkounkou (on loan from Everton)
15	MF	BEL	Daouda Peeters (on loan from Juventus)
16	GK	BEL	Arnaud Bodart
18	FW	BEL	Renaud Emond
19	MF	MAR	Selim Amallah
20	MF	COD	Merveille Bokadi

No.	Pos.	Nation	Player
23	FW	BFA	Abdoul Tapsoba
24	MF	FRA	Mathieu Cafaro
26	MF	BEL	Nicolas Raskin
28	MF	COD	Samuel Bastien
30	GK	BEL	Laurent Henkinet
31	DF	BEL	Alexandro Calut
33	DF	BEL	Nathan Ngoy
34	DF	CYP	Konstantinos Laifis
37	MF	BEL	Olivier Dumont
38	FW	BEL	Cihan Çanak
40	GK	BEL	Matthieu Epolo
41	FW	MAR	Camil Mmaee
—	FW	MNE	Aleksandar Boljević

=== Out on loan ===
Note: Flags indicate national team as defined under FIFA eligibility rules; some limited exceptions apply. Players may hold more than one non-FIFA nationality.

No.	Pos.	Nation	Player
—	MF	BEL	Fostave Mabani (at MVV)
—	MF	ISR	Eden Shamir (at Maccabi Tel Aviv)
—	FW	URU	Felipe Avenatti (at K Beerschot VA)
—	FW	NOR	Aron Dønnum (at Vålerenga)

No.	Pos.	Nation	Player
—	FW	COD	Jackson Muleka (at Kasımpaşa)
—	FW	BEL	Mitchy Ntelo (at MVV)
—	FW	FRA	Eddy Sylvestre (at Pau FC)

== Pre-season and friendlies ==
Win Draw Loss Fixtures

26 June 2021 Friendly	Standard Liège (Belgium)	1–3	(Belgium) Union Rochefortoise	Liège, Belgium
18:00 CEST (UTC+2)				Stadium: Académie Robert Louis-Dreyfus
Note: Four halves of 30 minutes.

30 June 2021 Friendly	Standard Liège (Belgium)	0–0	(Belgium) Union SG	Liège, Belgium
18:00 CEST (UTC+2)				Stadium: Académie Robert Louis-Dreyfus

3 July 2021 Friendly	Standard Liège (Belgium)	3–2	(Belgium) Cercle Brugge	Liège, Belgium
18:00 CEST (UTC+2)				Stadium: Stade Maurice Dufrasne

7 July 2021 Friendly	Lens (France)	1–1	(Belgium) Standard Liège	Billy-Montigny, France
15:00 CEST (UTC+2)				Stadium: Stade Paul Guerre

10 July 2021 Friendly	Standard Liège (Belgium)	2–2	(Belgium) KV Mechelen	Liège, Belgium
17:00 CEST (UTC+2)	Drăguș 30'; Klauss 46'		Hairemans 7'; Walsh 29'	Stadium: Académie Robert Louis-Dreyfus

17 July 2021 Friendly	Standard Liège (Belgium)	3–3	(France) Rennes	Liège, Belgium
18:00 CEST (UTC+2)	Klauss 22' (pen.), 45+2'; Raskin 41'		Bourigeaud 69' (pen.); Abline 74'; Tait 90'	Stadium: Stade Maurice Dufrasne

24 July 2021 Friendly	Heist (Belgium)	1–3	(Belgium) Standard Liège	Heist-op-den-Berg, Belgium
19:30 CEST (UTC+2)		Report		Stadium: KSK Heist Terrein 3

7 January 2022 Friendly	Standard Liège (Belgium)	2–2	(Belgium) Liège	Liège, Belgium
15:30 CET (UTC+1)		Report		Stadium: Stade Maurice Dufrasne

== Competitions ==
=== Overall record ===
Competition	First match	Last match	Starting round	Final position	Record							
Competition	First match	Last match	Starting round	Final position	Pld	W	D	L	GF	GA	GD	Win %
Belgian First Division A	23 July 2021	10 April 2022	Matchday 1	14th	34	9	9	16	32	51	−19	26.47
Belgian Cup	26 October 2021	22 December 2021	Sixth round	Quarter-finals	3	2	0	1	4	3	+1	66.67
Total					37	11	9	17	36	54	−18	29.73

Source: Soccerway

=== Belgian First Division A ===
==== League table ====
Pos	Team	Pld	W	D	L	GF	GA	GD	Pts
12	Oostende	34	10	7	17	34	61	−27	37
13	Kortrijk	34	9	10	15	43	48	−5	37
14	Standard Liège	34	9	9	16	32	51	−19	36
15	Eupen	34	8	8	18	37	61	−24	32
16	Zulte Waregem	34	8	8	18	42	69	−27	32

Source: Jupiler Pro League (in Dutch), Soccerway
Rules for classification: 1) Points; 2) Matches won; 3) Goal difference; 4) Goals scored; 5) Away matches won; 6) Away goal difference; 7) Away goals scored; 8) Play-off.

==== Results summary ====
Overall								Home						Away					
Pld	W	D	L	GF	GA	GD	Pts	W	D	L	GF	GA	GD	W	D	L	GF	GA	GD
34	9	9	16	32	51	−19	36	3	5	9	15	26	−11	6	4	7	17	25	−8

Source: Jupiler Pro League

==== Results by round ====
Round	1	2	3	4	5	6	7	8	9	10	11	12	13	14	15	16	17	18	19	20	21	22	23	24	25	26	27	28	29	30	31	32	33	34
Ground	H	A	H	A	H	A	A	H	H	A	H	A	H	A	H	A	H	A	H	A	H	A	H	A	H	H	A	A	H	A	H	A	H	A
Result	D	W	L	W	W	L	W	L	L	L	D	D	D	D	W	L	L	W	W	L	L	D	D	W	L	D	L	L	L	D	L	W	L	L
Position	12	3	12	7	3	6	3	7	11	12	13	13	12	13	12	12	13	10	11	12	15	14	14	12	12	13	13	14	14	13	13	13	13	14

Source: Jupiler Pro League
A = Away; H = Home; W = Win; D = Draw; L = Loss

==== Matches ====
The league fixtures were announced on 8 June 2021.

23 July 2021 1	Standard Liège	1–1	Genk	Liège
20:45 CEST (UTC+2)	Sissako (yellow card) 32'; Laifis 69'	Report	Heynen (yellow card) 55'; Paintsil (yellow card) 88'; Bongonda 90+2'	Stadium: Stade Maurice Dufrasne; Attendance: 9,000; Referee: Lawrence Visser

1 August 2021 2	Zulte Waregem	1–2	Standard Liège	Waregem
16:00 CEST (UTC+2)	Sissako 74'	Report	Klauss 59' (pen.); Tapsoba 89'	Stadium: Regenboogstadion; Attendance: 4,124; Referee: Nicolas Laforge

8 August 2021 3	Standard Liège	2–5	Antwerp	Liège
13:30 CEST (UTC+2)	Sissako (yellow card) 39'; Bastien (yellow card) 49'; Muleka 55'; Drăguș 77'; Pavlovic (yellow card) 80'	Report	Frey 6', 37', 59', 61', 68'; Seck (yellow card) 8'; Benson (yellow card) 44'; De Laet (yellow card) 79'; B. Verstraete (yellow card) 80'; Gerkens (yellow card) 90+1'	Stadium: Stade Maurice Dufrasne; Attendance: 8,038; Referee: Bram Van Driessche

15 August 2021 4	Beerschot	0–1	Standard Liège	Antwerp
13:30 CEST (UTC+2)		Report	Klauss 64'	Stadium: Olympic Stadium; Attendance: 4,000; Referee: Alexandre Boucaut

20 August 2021 5	Standard Liège	1–0	Oostende	Liège
16:15 CEST (UTC+2)	Amallah 78'	Report		Stadium: Stade Maurice Dufrasne; Attendance: 16,261; Referee: Lawrence Visser

28 August 2021 6	Union Saint-Gilloise	4–0	Standard Liège	Brussels
20:45 CEST (UTC+2)	Nielsen 23', (yellow card) 75'; Vanzeir 39', 52', 71'	Report	Peeters (yellow card) 22'; Al Dakhil (yellow card) 53'; Rafia (yellow card) 70'; Amallah (yellow card) 87'; Klauss (yellow card) 91'	Stadium: Stade Joseph Marien; Attendance: 6,255; Referee: Jonathan Lardot

12 September 2021 7	Seraing	0–1	Standard Liège	Seraing
16:15 CEST (UTC+2)		Report	Amallah 21'	Stadium: Stade du Pairay; Attendance: 7,000; Referee: Bram Van Driessche

19 September 2021 8	Standard Liège	0–1	Anderlecht	Liège
18:30 CEST (UTC+2)	Al-Dakhil (red card) 7'; Klauss (yellow card) 37'; Nkounkou (yellow card) 67'; Amallah (yellow card) 84'; Fai (red card) 84'	Report	Gómez (yellow card) 9'; Refaelov 12'; Harwood-Bellis (yellow card) 24'; Ashimeru (yellow card) 90'; Zirkzee (yellow card) 90'	Stadium: Stade Maurice Dufrasne; Attendance: 24,000; Referee: Nicolas Laforge

25 September 2021 9	Standard Liège	1–2	Sint-Truiden	Liège
18:30 CEST (UTC+2)		Report		Stadium: Stade Maurice Dufrasne; Attendance: 20,456; Referee: Wim Smet

1 October 2021 10	Mechelen	3–1	Standard Liège	Mechelen
CEST (UTC+2)	Cuypers 4'; Mrabti 10' (pen.); Walsh 18'	Report	Drăguș 82'	Stadium: Achter de Kazerne; Attendance: 15,067; Referee: Nathan Verboomen

16 October 2021 11	Standard Liège	2–2	OH Leuven	Liège
18:30 CEST (UTC+2)	Tapsoba 39'; Drăguș 50'	Report	Mercier 90+6'; Kaba 90+9'	Stadium: Stade Maurice Dufrasne; Attendance: 18,645; Referee: Kevin Van Damme

23 October 2021 12	Cercle Brugge	1–1	Standard Liège	Bruges
16:15 CEST (UTC+2)	Daland 16'	Report	Bastien 4'	Stadium: Jan Breydel Stadium; Attendance: 3,552; Referee: Jan Boterberg

30 October 2021 13	Standard Liège	1–1	Kortrijk	Liège
18:30 CEST (UTC+2)	Bokadi 82'	Report	Moreno 52'	Stadium: Stade Maurice Dufrasne; Attendance: 16,852; Referee: Erik Lambrechts

7 November 2021 14	Club Brugge	2–2	Standard Liège	Bruges
13:30 CET (UTC+1)	Dost 15'; De Ketelaere 35'	Report	Dønnum 39'; Dussenne 52' (pen.)	Stadium: Jan Breydel Stadium; Attendance: 26,305; Referee: Lothar D'hondt

20 November 2021 15	Standard Liège	1–0	Eupen	Liège
20:45 CET (UTC+1)	Raskin (yellow card) 16'; Agbadou 45+2' (o.g.)	Report	N'Dri (yellow card) 53'; Keita (yellow card) 90'	Stadium: Stade Maurice Dufrasne; Attendance: 16,341; Referee: Jasper Vergoote

28 November 2021 16	Gent	3–1	Standard Liège	Ghent
18:30 CET (UTC+1)	Tissoudali 22', 67'; Siquet 57' (o.g.)	Report	Dønnum 68'	Stadium: Ghelamco Arena; Attendance: 18,120; Referee: Jonathan Lardot

5 December 2021 17	Standard Liège	0–3	Charleroi	Liège
18:30 CET (UTC+1)		Report	Nicholson 22', 57'; Knežević 38'	Stadium: Stade Maurice Dufrasne; Attendance: 22,512; Referee: Nicolas Laforge

12 December 2021 18	Antwerp	2–3	Standard Liège	Antwerp
13:30 CET (UTC+1)	Seck (red card) 45+3'; Yusuf (yellow card) 49'; Nainggolan (yellow card) 64'; Engels 66', (yellow card) 90+12'; Balikwisha 77'; Bataille (red card) 90+2'; Butez (yellow card) 90+6'	Report	Fai (yellow card) 27'; Amallah (yellow card) 45+3'; Dussenne (yellow card) 55'; Laifis 57'; Raskin (yellow card) 55'; Bokadi (yellow card) 64'; Carcela 87'; Muleka 90'; Pavlović (red card) 90+2'; Nkounkou (yellow card) 90+12'	Stadium: Bosuilstadion; Attendance: 10,980; Referee: Lawrence Visser

19 December 2021 20	OH Leuven	2–1	Standard Liège	Leuven
20:45 CET (UTC+1)	Maertens 15', 38'	Report	Fai 90+4'	Stadium: Den Dreef; Attendance: 4,820; Referee: Alexandre Boucaut

26 December 2021 21	Standard Liège	0–1	Zulte Waregem	Liège
20:45 CET (UTC+1)	Fai (yellow card) 49' (yellow-red card) 88'	Report	Gano 55'; Boya (yellow card) 81'	Stadium: Stade Maurice Dufrasne; Attendance: 0 Referee: Bert Put

16 January 2022 22	Anderlecht	1–1	Standard Liège	Anderlecht
18:30 CET (UTC+1)	Verschaeren 32'	Report	Drăguș 86'	Stadium: Constant Vanden Stock Stadium; Attendance: 0 Referee: Bram Van Driessche

23 January 2022 23	Standard Liège	2–2	Club Brugge	Liège
13:30 CET (UTC+1)	Cafaro 10'; Emond 48'	Report	Dost 40', 59'	Stadium: Stade Maurice Dufrasne; Attendance: 0 Referee: Jonathan Lardot

26 January 2022 24	Eupen	0–2	Standard Liège	Eupen
18:45 CET (UTC+1)		Report	Emond 45'; Drăguș 90'	Stadium: Kehrwegstadion; Attendance: 0 Referee: Wim Smet

30 January 2022 25	Standard Liège	1–2	Mechelen	Liège
18:30 CET (UTC+1)	Cafaro 44'	Report	Mrabti 49'; Storm 90'	Stadium: Stade Maurice Dufrasne; Attendance: 10,286; Referee: Bram Van Driessche

5 February 2022 26	Standard Liège	1–1	Cercle Brugge	Liège
18:30 CET (UTC+1)	Raskin 55'	Report	Hotić 44'	Stadium: Stade Maurice Dufrasne; Attendance: 0 Referee: Lawrence Visser

13 February 2022 27	Genk	2–0	Standard Liège	Genk
13:30 CET (UTC+1)	Bongonda 44'; Onuachu 53'	Report		Stadium: Luminus Arena; Attendance: 13,581; Referee: Nathan Verboomen

19 February 2022 28	Oostende	1–0	Standard Liège	Ostend
18:30 CET (UTC+1)	Santos 28'; Capon (yellow card) 62'	Report	Emond (yellow card) 26'; Cafaro (yellow card) 34'; Raskin (yellow card) 53'; Bokadi (yellow card) 81'; Nkounkou (yellow card) 86'	Stadium: Diaz Arena; Attendance: 3,267; Referee: Erik Lambrechts

27 February 2022 29	Standard Liège	0–1	Gent	Liège
18:30 CET (UTC+1)		Report	Tissoudali 88'	Stadium: Stade Maurice Dufrasne; Attendance: 0 Referee: Jonathan Lardot

2 March 2022 19	Standard Liège	1–0	Beerschot	Liège
20:45 CET (UTC+1)	Drăguș 34'	Report		Stadium: Stade Maurice Dufrasne; Attendance: 9,423; Referee: Christof Dierick

6 March 2022 30	Charleroi	0–0	Standard Liège	Charleroi
18:30 CET (UTC+1)		Report		Stadium: Stade du Pays de Charleroi; Attendance: 13,000; Referee: Jasper Vergoote

13 March 2022 31	Standard Liège	0–1	Seraing	Liège
16:15 CET (UTC+1)		Report	Bernier 55'	Stadium: Stade Maurice Dufrasne; Attendance: 16,167; Referee: Lothar D'hondt

20 March 2022 32	Kortrijk	0–1	Standard Liège	Kortrijk
16:00 CET (UTC+1)		Report	Amallah 77'	Stadium: Guldensporen Stadion; Attendance: 6,576; Referee: Kevin Van Damme

3 April 2022 33	Standard Liège	1–3	Union Saint-Gilloise	Liège
13:30 CEST (UTC+2)	Sissako 24'	Report	Teuma 9'; Nieuwkoop 70'; Nielsen 83'	Stadium: Stade Maurice Dufrasne; Attendance: 21,367; Referee: Nathan Verboomen

10 April 2022 34	Sint-Truiden	3–0	Standard Liège	Sint-Truiden
18:30 CEST (UTC+2)	Hara 22'; Hayashi 28'; Klauss 77'	Report		Stadium: Stayen; Attendance: 10,076; Referee: Lothar D'hondt

=== Belgian Cup ===
26 October 2021 Sixth round	Excel Mouscron	0–1	Standard Liège	Mouscron
20:45 CEST (UTC+2)		Report	Klauss 7' (pen.)	Stadium: Stade Le Canonnier; Attendance: 4,000; Referee: Alexandre Boucaut

2 December 2021 Seventh round	Standard Liège	2–0 (a.e.t.)	Beerschot	Liège
20:45 CET (UTC+1)	Muleka 97'; Bokadi 119'	Report		Stadium: Stade Maurice Dufrasne; Referee: Kevin Van Damme

22 December 2021 Quarter-finals	Gent	3–1	Standard Liège	Ghent
20:30 CET (UTC+1)	Kums 8'; Tissoudali 53', 90+2'	Report	Dønnum 46'	Stadium: Ghelamco Arena; Referee: Jonathan Lardot
