= Steven Alzate =

Colombia international footballer (born 1998)

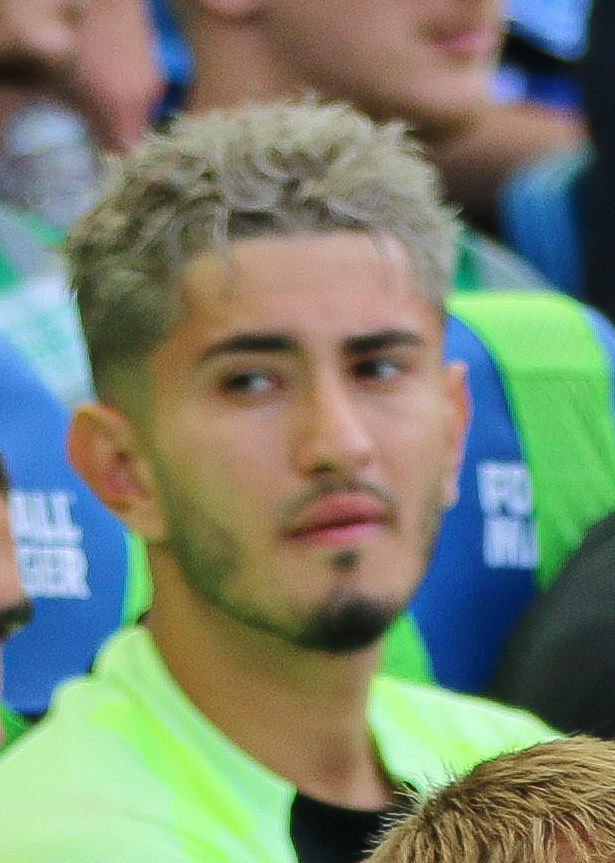
- Alzate with Brighton & Hove Albion in 2022

Personal information
- Full name: Steven Alzate
- Date of birth: 8 September 1998 (age 28)
- Place of birth: Camden, England
- Height: 1.80 m (5 ft 11 in)
- Position: Midfielder

Team information
- Current team: Atlanta United
- Number: 7

Youth career
- –2016: Leyton Orient

Senior career*
Years	Team	Apps	(Gls)
2016–2017	Leyton Orient	12	(1)
2017–2024	Brighton & Hove Albion	43	(1)
2018–2019	→ Swindon Town (loan)	22	(2)
2022–2024	→ Standard Liège (loan)	51	(5)
2024–2025	Hull City	28	(0)
2025–	Atlanta United	23	(0)

International career
2019–2022	Colombia	7	(0)
- * Club domestic league appearances and goals as of 13:18, 15 November 2026 (UTC)

Steven Alzate (born 8 September 1998) is a professional footballer who plays as a midfielder for Major League Soccer club Atlanta United. Born in England, he played for the Colombia national team.

== Club career ==
=== Leyton Orient ===
Alzate made his Football League debut as a second-half substitute for Sandro Semedo in Orient's 4–1 defeat at Stevenage on 28 February 2017. He scored his first senior goal in his next game, the 4–0 win at Newport County on 4 March 2017.

=== Brighton & Hove Albion ===
On 31 July 2017, Alzate signed for Brighton & Hove Albion for an undisclosed fee.

==== Loan to Swindon Town ====
On 2 July 2018, Alzate joined League Two side Swindon Town on a season-long loan. His first goal for the club came on 22 September, against Yeovil Town, when he scored with a 20-yard strike. On 1 January 2019, Alzate was ruled out for at least three months after he was diagnosed with a stress fracture to his back. The loan deal expired on 9 January, and Alzate returned to Brighton.

==== Breakthrough at Brighton ====
Alzate made his debut for the "Seagulls" in the EFL Cup on 27 August 2019 where he played the full match in the 2–1 away win against Bristol Rovers setting up Glenn Murray's late winner. Alzate was named on the bench in a Premier League fixture for the first time in a 1–1 home draw against Burnley on 14 September. He remained an unused substitute. Alzate made his Premier League and league debut for Brighton on 21 September playing the full match in the 0–0 draw at Newcastle United. He made his home debut on 5 October where he started the match against Tottenham Hotspur, which ended in a 3–0 victory.

Alzate scored his first Albion goal on 23 January 2021, deflecting a Alexis Mac Allister shot in the back of the net in a 2–1 home victory over Blackpool in the FA Cup fourth round, a match where he also recorded an assist for Yves Bissouma's 30-yard stunner. On 3 February 2021, Alzate scored his first Premier League goal to secure a 1–0 away win over Liverpool, sealing Brighton's first win at Anfield in Premier League history and their first league win at Liverpool since 1982. Alzate played in Brighton's 3–2 home victory over champions Manchester City on 18 May, with fans returning to football, in which they went from 2–0 down to beat City in a league game for the first time since 1989.

Alzate made four appearances at the start of the 2021–22 season suffering an injury on his fourth appearance in the 1–1 away draw against bitter rivals Crystal Palace on 27 September, replacing the injured Dan Burn at half time before coming off injured himself 20 minutes later. He was later ruled out for three months with an ankle injury. He made his return to action on Boxing Day, coming on as a substitute and helping Brighton maintain their lead in the 2–0 home victory over Brentford. Alzate made his first league start of the season where he played the whole of the 1–1 home draw against European champions Chelsea on 18 January 2022.

Alzate scored a long distance effort in his first game of the 2022–23 season on 24 August 2022, scoring Brighton's second in the eventual 3–0 away win over League One side Forest Green Rovers in the second round of the EFL Cup.

On 5 June 2024, Brighton announced that Alzate would be leaving the club at the expiration of his contract in the summer, ending his seven-year spell with the Seagulls.

==== Loans to Standard Liège ====
On 9 September 2022, Alzate signed for Belgian Pro League side Standard Liège on loan for the 2022–23 season.

On 6 September 2023, Alzate re-signed with the club on a loan deal for another season.

=== Hull City ===
On 9 September 2024, Alzate signed for Hull City on a two-year deal, with an option for a further 12 months. On 28 September, he made his debut off the bench as an 83rd-minute replacement for Marvin Mehlem in the 4–1 home win against Cardiff City.

=== Atlanta United ===
On 4 August 2025, Alzate moved to the United States, joining Major League Soccer side Atlanta United on a six-year contract until 2031.

== International career ==
On 6 November 2019, Alzate received his first call-up to the Colombia national team for friendlies against Peru and Ecuador in November 2019. He made his debut on 16 November coming on as a substitute in a 1–0 home victory over Peru. Five days later he made his first start for Colombia in the 1–0 away win against Ecuador where he was highly praised by manager Carlos Queiroz.

Alzate was recalled to the Colombia squad in January 2022 for 2022 FIFA World Cup qualifiers against Peru and Argentina, after not being included in selection since October 2020.

== Personal life ==
Alzate was born in Camden, a town in London, England, to Colombian parents, making him a citizen of both England and Colombia, and subsequently made him eligible to represent the Colombia national team later on.

== Career statistics ==
=== Club ===
As of 30 April 2025

Appearances and goals by club, season and competition
Club	Season	League			National cup (Note: Includes FA Cup, Belgian Cup)		League cup (Note: Includes EFL Cup)		Other		Total	
Club	Season	Division	Apps	Goals	Apps	Goals	Apps	Goals	Apps	Goals	Apps	Goals
Leyton Orient	2016–17	League Two	12	1	0	0	0	0	0	0	12	1
Brighton & Hove Albion	2017–18	Premier League	0	0	0	0	0	0	—		0	0
Brighton & Hove Albion	2018–19	Premier League	0	0	0	0	0	0	—		0	0
Brighton & Hove Albion	2019–20	Premier League	19	0	1	0	1	0	—		21	0
Brighton & Hove Albion	2020–21	Premier League	15	1	2	1	0	0	—		17	2
Brighton & Hove Albion	2021–22	Premier League	9	0	1	0	2	0	—		12	0
Brighton & Hove Albion	2022–23	Premier League	0	0	0	0	1	1	—		1	1
Brighton & Hove Albion	2023–24	Premier League	0	0	0	0	0	0	0	0	0	0
Brighton & Hove Albion	Total		43	1	4	1	4	1	0	0	51	3
Brighton & Hove Albion; Reserves & Academy	2017–18	—			—		—		2 (Note: Appearance(s) in EFL Trophy)	0	2	0
Brighton & Hove Albion; Reserves & Academy	2019–20	—			—		—		1	0	1	0
Brighton & Hove Albion; Reserves & Academy	Total		—		—		—		3	0	3	0
Swindon Town (loan)	2018–19	League Two	22	2	0	0	1	0	1	0	24	2
Standard Liège (loan)	2022–23	Belgian Pro League	27	3	2	0	—		—		29	3
Standard Liège (loan)	2023–24	Belgian Pro League	19	1	1	0	—		—		20	1
Standard Liège (loan)	Total		46	4	3	0	—		0	0	49	4
Hull City	2024–25	EFL Championship	28	0	1	0	0	0	0	0	29	0
Career total			134	7	7	1	5	1	4	0	150	9

=== International ===
As of match played 28 September 2022

Appearances and goals by national team and year
National team	Year	Apps	Goals
Colombia	2019	2	0
Colombia	2020	2	0
Colombia	2022	3	0
Total		7	0
