= Abdoul Tapsoba =

Burkinabé footballer (born 2001)

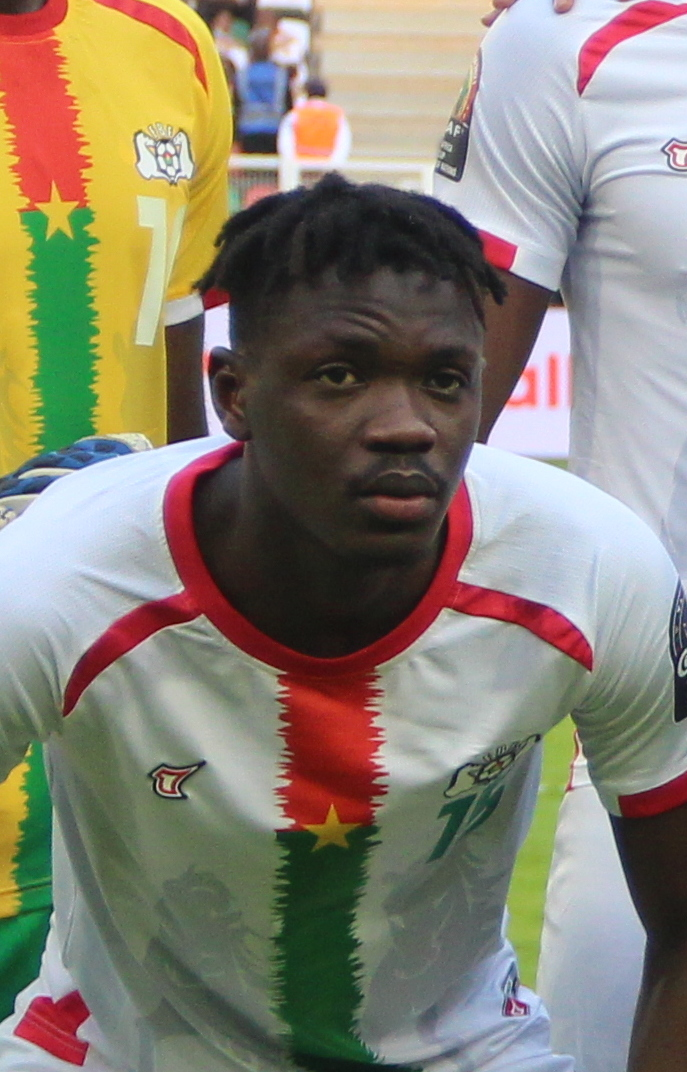
- Tapsoba with Burkina Faso in 2022

Personal information
- Full name: Abdoul Fessal Tapsoba
- Date of birth: 23 August 2001 (age 25)
- Place of birth: Bobo-Dioulasso, Burkina Faso
- Height: 1.77 m (5 ft 10 in)
- Position: Forward

Team information
- Current team: Radomiak Radom
- Number: 15

Senior career*
Years	Team	Apps	(Gls)
2018–2020	ASEC Mimosas		
2019–2020	→ Standard Liège (loan)	0	(0)
2020–2024	Standard Liège	37	(3)
2022–2024	SL16 FC	9	(2)
2023	→ Sheriff Tiraspol (loan)	9	(2)
2023–2024	→ Amiens (loan)	15	(0)
2024–2025	Adanaspor	9	(0)
2025–	Radomiak Radom	56	(7)

International career^{‡}
2021–	Burkina Faso	32	(6)
- * Club domestic league appearances and goals as of 15:09, 9 November 2026 (UTC) ‡ National team caps and goals as of 20:42, 13 November 2026 (UTC)

Abdoul Fessal Tapsoba (born 23 August 2001) is a Burkinabé professional footballer who plays as a forward for Ekstraklasa club Radomiak Radom and the Burkina Faso national team.

== Club career ==
Tapsoba began his career with Ivorian club ASEC Mimosas in the Ivorian Ligue 1. On 28 November 2018, Tapsoba scored his first goal for the club in the CAF Champions League against Mangasport. His 5th-minute goal was enough in a 1–0 victory. In September 2019, Tapsoba was loaned out to Belgian side Standard Liège and mainly played with the reserve side. After the season ended, Tapsoba was signed permanently by Standard Liège.

Tapsoba made his professional debut for Standard on 8 August 2020 against Cercle Brugge. He came on as a 78th-minute substitute for Maxime Lestienne as Standard Liège won 1–0.

On 3 February 2023, Tapsoba was loaned to Sheriff Tiraspol in Moldova, with an option to buy.

On 7 July 2023, Amiens SC announced the season-long loan signing of Tapsoba.

On 13 September 2024, Tapsoba signed a two-season contract with Adanaspor in Turkish TFF First League.

On 29 January 2025, he moved on a free transfer to Polish club Radomiak Radom on a two-and-a-half-year contract.

== International career ==
Tapsoba made his debut for Burkina Faso national team on 29 March 2021 in an AFCON 2021 qualifier against South Sudan.

Tapsoba featured in the third place of 2021 AFCON game against Cameroon.

== Career statistics ==
=== Club ===
As of match played 2 November 2026

Appearances and goals by club, season and competition
Club	Season	League			National cup (Note: Includes Belgian Cup, Moldovan Cup, Coupe de France, Turkish Cup, Polish Cup)		Continental		Other		Total	
Club	Season	Division	Apps	Goals	Apps	Goals	Apps	Goals	Apps	Goals	Apps	Goals
Standard Liège	2020–21	Belgian First Division A	19	0	3	0	3 (Note: Appearances in UEFA Europa League)	2	4 (Note: Appearances in Europa League play-offs)	0	29	2
Standard Liège	2021–22	Belgian First Division A	15	2	2	0	—		—		17	2
Standard Liège	2022–23	Belgian First Division A	3	1	0	0	—		—		3	1
Standard Liège	Total		37	3	5	0	3	2	4	0	49	5
SL16 FC	2022–23	Challenger Pro League	9	2	—		—		—		9	2
Sheriff Tiraspol (loan)	2022–23	Moldovan Super Liga	9	2	3	2	4 (Note: Appearances in UEFA Europa Conference League)	1	—		16	5
Amiens (loan)	2023–24	Ligue 2	15	0	1	0	—		—		16	0
Adanaspor	2024–25	TFF 1. Lig	9	0	1	1	—		—		10	1
Radomiak Radom	2024–25	Ekstraklasa	14	1	—		—		—		14	1
Radomiak Radom	2025–26	Ekstraklasa	31	6	1	0	—		—		32	6
Radomiak Radom	2026–27	Ekstraklasa	11	0	1	1	—		—		12	1
Radomiak Radom	Total		56	7	2	1	—		—		58	8
Career total			135	14	12	4	7	3	4	0	158	21

=== International ===
As of match played 13 November 2026

Appearances and goals by national team and year
National team	Year	Apps	Goals
Burkina Faso
Burkina Faso	2021	6	4
Burkina Faso	2022	10	0
Burkina Faso	2023	7	1
Burkina Faso	2024	5	0
Burkina Faso	2026	4	1
Total		32	6

Scores and results list Burkina Faso's goal tally first, score column indicates score after each Tapsoba goal.

List of international goals scored by Abdoul Tapsoba
No.	Date	Venue	Opponent	Score	Result	Competition
1	7 September 2021	Stade de Marrakech, Marrakesh, Morocco	Algeria	1–1	1–1	2022 FIFA World Cup qualification
2	8 October 2021	Stade de Marrakech, Marrakesh, Morocco	Djibouti	1–0	4–0	2022 FIFA World Cup qualification
3	8 October 2021	Stade de Marrakech, Marrakesh, Morocco	Djibouti	2–0	4–0	2022 FIFA World Cup qualification
4	11 October 2021	Stade de Marrakech, Marrakesh, Morocco	Djibouti	2–0	2–0	2022 FIFA World Cup qualification
5	24 March 2023	Stade de Marrakech, Marrakesh, Morocco	Togo	1–0	1–0	2023 Africa Cup of Nations qualification
6	9 June 2026	National Football Stadium, Minsk, Belarus	Belarus	2–2	2–2	Friendly

== Honours ==
Sheriff Tiraspol

- Moldovan Super Liga: 2022–23
- Moldovan Cup: 2022–23
