= Aron Dønnum =

Norwegian footballer (born 1998)

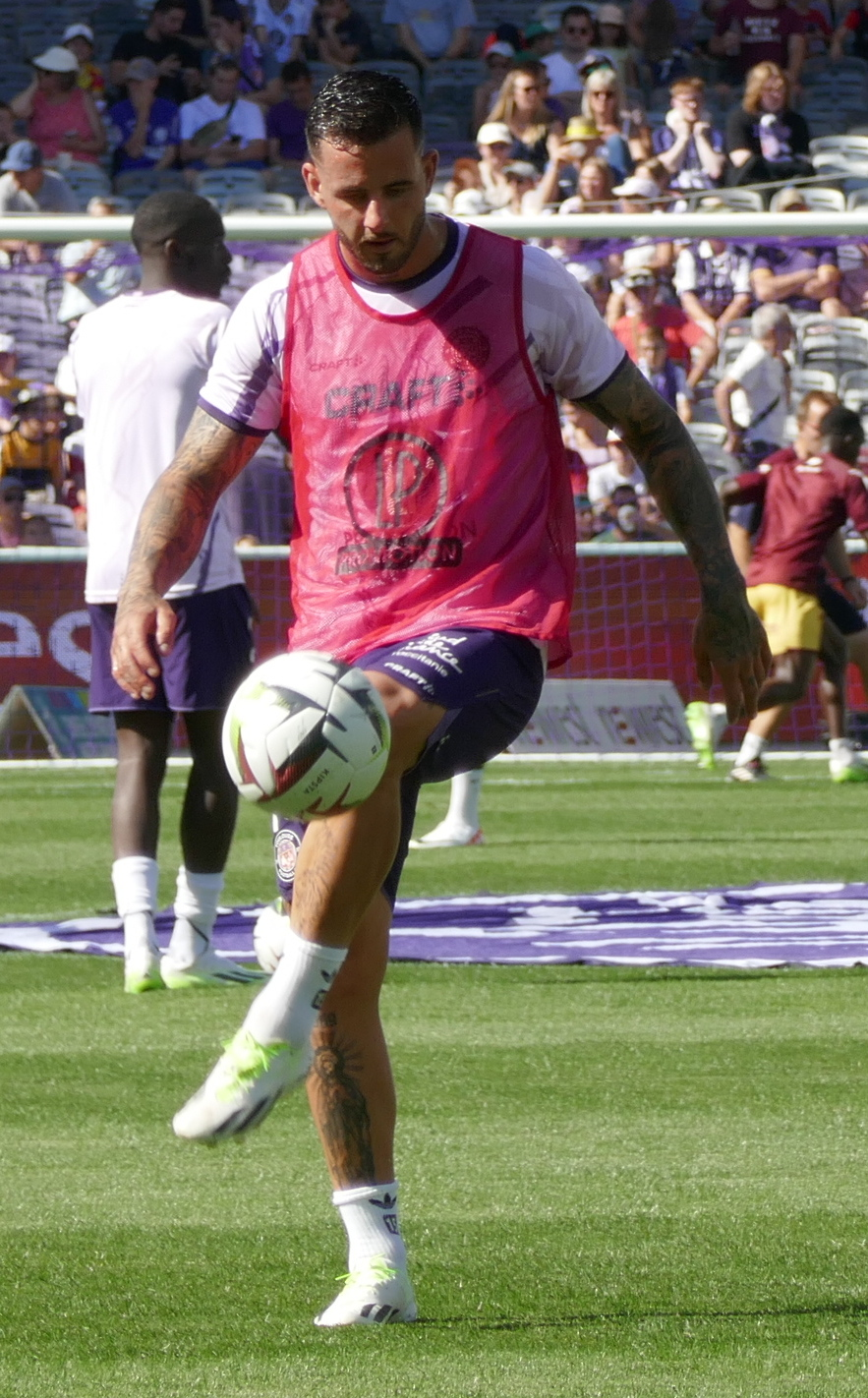
- Dønnum training with Toulouse in 2023

Personal information
- Full name: Aron Leonard Bizet Dønnum
- Date of birth: 20 April 1998 (age 28)
- Place of birth: Eidsvoll, Norway
- Height: 1.79 m (5 ft 10 in)
- Position: Winger

Team information
- Current team: Toulouse
- Number: 15

Youth career
- 2010–2012: Eidsvold Turn
- 2013–2017: Vålerenga

Senior career*
Years	Team	Apps	(Gls)
2017–2021	Vålerenga	75	(20)
2018	→ HamKam (loan)	15	(1)
2021–2023	Standard Liège	69	(5)
2022	→ Vålerenga (loan)	11	(2)
2023–	Toulouse	89	(7)

International career^{‡}
2019	Norway U21	6	(1)
2021–	Norway	17	(2)
- * Club domestic league appearances and goals as of 17 October 2026 ‡ National team caps and goals as of 13 November 2025

Aron Leonard Bizet Dønnum (born 20 April 1998) is a Norwegian professional footballer who plays as a winger for Ligue 1 club Toulouse and the Norway national team.

== Club career ==
Dønnum made his debut for Vålerenga on 17 July 2017 against Kristiansund, in a game that ended 1–1.

He joined Belgian First Division A club Standard Liège in July 2021, having agreed to a four-year contract with the club.

On 30 March 2022, Dønnum returned to Vålerenga on loan until 30 June 2022.

== International career ==
Dønnum made his debut for the Norway national team on 2 June 2021 in a friendly against Luxembourg, substituting for Jens Petter Hauge in the 64th minute.

== Personal life ==
As a boy, Dønnum was seen as "restless" and a troublemaker.

In June 2025, Dønnum married fellow footballer Celin Bizet in a ceremony in Italy. They both took the surname Bizet Dønnum. They had been a couple for three years. The couple welcomed their first child in June 2026, a boy named Gio.

== Career statistics ==
=== Club ===
As of match played 16 October 2026

Appearances and goals by club, season and competition
Club	Season	League			National cup (Note: Includes Norwegian Cup, Belgian Cup, Coupe de France)		Continental		Other		Total	
Club	Season	Division	Apps	Goals	Apps	Goals	Apps	Goals	Apps	Goals	Apps	Goals
Vålerenga	2017	Eliteserien	7	0	2	1	—		—		9	1
Vålerenga	2018	Eliteserien	8	0	1	0	—		—		9	0
Vålerenga	2019	Eliteserien	24	6	3	1	—		—		27	7
Vålerenga	2020	Eliteserien	26	8	—		—		—		26	8
Vålerenga	2021	Eliteserien	10	6	0	0	0	0	—		10	6
Vålerenga	Total		75	20	6	2	0	0	—		81	22
HamKam (loan)	2018	1. divisjon	15	1	4	0	—		—		19	1
Vålerenga (loan)	2022	Eliteserien	11	2	2	3	—		—		13	5
Standard Liège	2021–22	Belgian Pro League	25	2	3	1	—		—		28	3
Standard Liège	2022–23	Belgian Pro League	39	3	2	0	—		—		41	3
Standard Liège	2023–24	Belgian Pro League	5	0	—		—		—		5	0
Standard Liège	Total		69	5	5	1	—		—		74	6
Toulouse	2023–24	Ligue 1	27	0	1	0	8 (Note: Appearances in UEFA Europa League)	1	1 (Note: Appearance in Trophée des Champions)	0	37	1
Toulouse	2024–25	Ligue 1	32	2	3	0	—		—		35	2
Toulouse	2025–26	Ligue 1	28	4	4	1	—		—		32	5
Toulouse	2026–27	Ligue 1	2	1	0	0	—		—		2	1
Toulouse	Total		89	7	8	1	8	1	1	0	106	9
Career total			259	35	25	7	8	1	1	0	295	43

=== International ===
As of match played 13 November 2025

Appearances and goals by national team and year
National team	Year	Apps	Goals
Norway
Norway	2021	2	0
Norway	2022	0	0
Norway	2023	2	1
Norway	2024	7	0
Norway	2025	6	1
Total		17	1

Scores and results list Norway's goal tally first, score column indicates score after each Dønnum goal.

List of international goals scored by Aron Dønnum
No.	Date	Venue	Opponent	Score	Result	Competition
1	19 November 2023	Hampden Park, Glasgow, Scotland	Scotland	1–0	3–3	UEFA Euro 2024 qualifying
2	22 March 2025	Zimbru Stadium, Chișinău, Moldova	Moldova	5–0	5–0	2026 FIFA World Cup qualification
