= Renaud Emond =

Belgian footballer (born 1991)

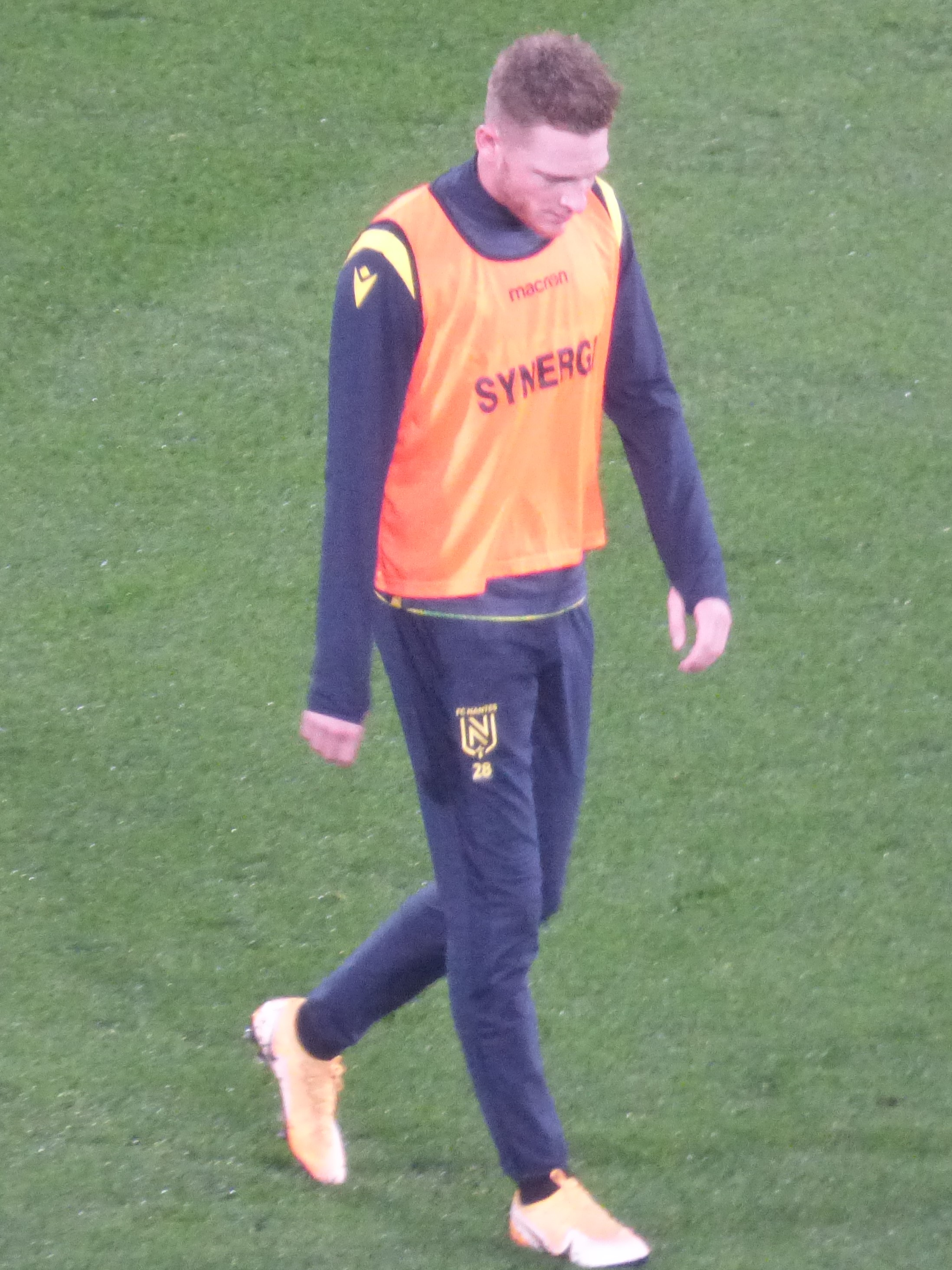
- Emond in 2020

Personal information
- Date of birth: 5 December 1991 (age 34)
- Place of birth: Arlon, Belgium
- Height: 1.86 m (6 ft 1 in)
- Position: Forward

Youth career
- 2000–2010: Virton

Senior career*
Years	Team	Apps	(Gls)
2010–2013	Virton	79	(43)
2013–2015	Waasland-Beveren	47	(16)
2015–2020	Standard Liège	89	(27)
2020–2022	Nantes	34	(2)
2022–2024	Standard Liège	25	(4)
2024–2025	Eupen	29	(6)
- * Club domestic league appearances and goals

Renaud Emond (born 5 December 1991) is a Belgian former professional footballer who played as a forward.

== Career ==
=== Virton ===
Born in Arlon, Belgium, Emond began his career at R.E. Virton, where his father was the president of the club. As a result, he said: "At one point Virton had no choice but to ask my father to become president. I told him not to do it but there was no other way. I knew the others were going to look at me wrong, because I was the president's son."

After making his professional debut during the 2009–10 season, Emond scored his first goal on 8 January 2011, which was against La Louvière Centre. Later in January, he scored five more goals, scoring twice against Olympic Charleroi and then a hat–trick against KSKL Ternat. At the end of the 2010–11 season, Emond went on to make 17 appearances and scoring 8 times in all competitions. The following 2011–12 season, Emond suffered an illness at the start of the season but soon recovered and scored his first goals of the season, in a 4–0 win over R.C.S. Verviétois on 2 October 2011. He went on to make 27 appearances and scoring 7 times in all competitions. For his performance, his contract was extended.

The 2012–13 season saw Emond score his first goal of the season, in a 1–1 draw against Royal Géants athois on 9 September 2012. On 2 December 2012, he added his tally to eight when he scored four times, in a 5–1 win over Diegem Sport. As a result, his performance attracted interests from clubs in Belgium but stayed throughout January. At the beginning of 2013, he scored two goals on two occasions, which were against RU Wallonne Ciney and Woluwe-Zaventem. On 27 March 2013, Emond scored another hat–trick, in a 5–0 win over Géants Athois. Later in the 2012–13 season, Emond scored twice on three occasions against Maasmechelen, Tournai and R. Union St-Gilloise. At the end of the season, making 36 appearances and scoring 27 times, Emond helped the side finish first place Belgian Division Three.

During his time there, he reflected about his time on how the club played in the different position. He also played alongside Thomas Meunier, who went on to represent the national team

=== Waasland-Beveren ===
On 15 May 2013, it was announced that Emond joined Waasland-Beveren on an undisclosed fee, signing a three–year contract with them. Emond had previously given a choice between Waasland-Beveren or Mons.

After appearing on the substitute bench at the start of the season, Emond made his Waasland-Beveren debut, coming on a late substitute for Hrvoje Čale, in a 1–0 loss against Lierse on 24 August 2013. On 31 October 2013, he scored his first goal for the club, in a 2–2 draw against Standard Liège. After suffering from an injury in late–November, he returned on 21 December 2013, coming on as a late substitute, in a 3–1 win over Lierse. Over the next four months, Emond remained in the first team despite being on the substitute bench and having little playing time. After returning from a hamstring injury in early April, he scored two goals in the match, in a 4–2 loss against Lierse on 26 April 2014. At the end of the 2013–14 season, Emond finished his first season at Waasland-Beveren, making 16 appearances and scoring 3 times in all competitions.

At the start of the 2014–15 season, Emond continued to keep his first team place at the club, where he was played in a 4-3-3 formation. His first goal of the season came on 30 August 2014, scoring in a 2–0 win over Lierse. After being sidelined with an injury, he scored on his return, in a 2–1 loss against KV Kortrijk on 18 October 2014. He then scored two goals in two matches between 29 October 2014 and 1 November 2014 against Gent and Oostende. He later added three more goals in three straight matches by the end of 2014 against Club Brugge, Royal Excel Mouscron and Westerlo. Later in the 2014–15 season, Emond later added seven goals, including twice on two separate occasions against KV Mechelen and Oostende. At the end of the 2014–15 season, he went on to make 34 appearances and scoring 14 appearances in all competitions. For his performance, Emond finished third place in the Footballer of the Year but lost out to Meunier.

In the 2015–16 season, Emond remained in the first team, where he established himself as a striker, as he scored two goals by the end of August against KV Kortrijk and Lokeren.

=== Standard Liège ===
On the last day of the transfer window, Emond moved to league rival Standard Liège for an undisclosed fee, signing a five–year contract, and was given a number 9 shirt. Upon joining the club, he revealed that Club Brugge and Anderlecht were interested in him before.

Emond made his Standard Liège debut, coming on as a substitute for Mohamed Yattara in the 59th minute, in a 1–0 loss against Lokeren on 13 September 2015. Two weeks later, on 26 September 2015, he scored his first Standard Liège goal, in a 2–2 draw against OH Leuven. He then scored again on 25 October 2015, in a 3–2 win over Charleroi. Over the next several months, he remained in the first team for the side but struggled to score goals. In addition, he appeared on the substitute bench in number of matches as the season progressed. On 20 March 2016, he came on as a substitute for Adrien Trebel and played the last 16 minutes of the game, as Standard Liège beat Club Brugge 2–1 in the Belgian Cup Final. At the end of the 2015–16 season Emond had made 26 appearances scoring twice in all competitions.

In the 2016–17 season, Emond started his season appearing as a substitute for Ivan Santini in the 59th minute of a 2–1 loss against Club Brugge in the Belgian Super Cup. He missed the start of the season having fallen out of favour with manager Yannick Ferrera and was linked a move away from the club. After returning to the first team against KV Kortrijk on 16 October 2016, he scored his first goal of the season seven days later, in a 5–0 win against his former club, Waasland-Beveren. On 28 November 2016, Emond scored his second goal of the season, in a 4–1 win over Zulte Waregem. Over the next several months, Emond appeared on the substitute bench in number of matches as the season progressed. He scored on 16 May 2017 as well as setting up a goal for Ryan Mmaee in a 3–1 win over Waasland-Beveren. Until the end of the 2016–17 season, Emond went on to make 16 appearances and scoring 3 times in all competitions.

In the 2017–18 season, Emond continued to feature on the substitute bench at the start of the season and then suffered a hip injury. After returning to the first team in early November, he then scored his first goal of the season, in a 3–2 win over KV Oostende in the quarter–final on 12 December 2017. The following month in January, Emond added four more goals to his tally against Zulte Waregem and Club Brugge (hat–trick). By March, Emond began to regain his first team place following the departure of the club's main striker Orlando Sá. As a result, his goalscoring form began to improve for the rest of the season and this was started when he added two goals against KV Mechelen and KV Oostende. Then on 18 March 2018, his goalscoring continued further when he scored the only goal of the game as Standard Liege beat Genk 1–0 in extra time to win the 2018 Belgian Cup Final and qualify for the UEFA Europa League. In the league's Championship play-offs, Emond added five more goals, including against Genk and Anderlecht in two separate matches. At the end of the 2017–18 season, Emond went on to make 34 appearances and scoring 15 times in all competitions.

Despite losing 2–1 to Club Brugge for the Belgium Super Cup, Emond started well when he scored third goal of the game, in a 3–2 win over Gent in the opening game of the season. He continued to establish himself in the first team despite facing competitions, including the return of Orlando Sá.

=== Nantes ===
In January 2020, Emond joined Ligue 1 side Nantes having agreed a contract until 2022. The transfer fee paid to Standard Liège was estimated at €3 to 4 million. However, the signing of Emond proved to be a "catastrophe" for Nantes according to observers. He left the club in January 2022, two years after his arrival.

=== Return to Standard Liège ===
On 13 January 2022, Emond returned to his former club Standard Liège. It was reported that Nantes had accepted a €200,000 offer from Les Rouches.

=== Eupen ===
On 4 January 2024, Emond signed a 1.5-year contract with Eupen.

== Personal life ==
Emond is married to his wife, Gabriella and together, they have a son, Ruben, who was born in January 2018.

Emond revealed that prior to his football he used to work as a car salesman. In April 2018, Emond and his father were helping Royal Excelsior Virton to save the club from financial problems.

== Career statistics ==
As of match played 13 April 2024

Appearances and goals by club, season and competition
Club	Season	League			National cup (Note: Includes Belgian Cup, Coupe de France)		Continental		Other		Total	
Club	Season	Division	Apps	Goals	Apps	Goals	Apps	Goals	Apps	Goals	Apps	Goals
Virton	2009–10	Belgian Third Division	2	0	0	0	—		—		2	0
Virton	2010–11	Belgian Third Division	15	8	4	0	—		—		19	8
Virton	2011–12	Belgian Third Division	27	8	3	0	—		—		30	8
Virton	2012–13	Belgian Third Division	35	27	2	1	—		—		37	28
Virton	Total		79	43	9	1	—		—		88	44
Waasland-Beveren	2013–14	Belgian Pro League	13	1	0	0	—		3 (Note: Appearances in Belgian Pro League play-offs)	2	16	3
Waasland-Beveren	2014–15	Belgian Pro League	28	13	0	0	—		6	1	34	14
Waasland-Beveren	2015–16	Belgian Pro League	6	2	0	0	—		—		6	2
Waasland-Beveren	Total		47	16	0	0	—		9	3	56	19
Standard Liège	2015–16	Belgian Pro League	19	2	4	0	—		2	0	25	2
Standard Liège	2016–17	Belgian Pro League	9	2	1	0	0	0	6 (Note: One appearance in Belgian Super Cup, five appearances and one goal in Belgian Pro League play-offs)	1	16	3
Standard Liège	2017–18	Belgian Pro League	19	4	5	6	—		10	5	34	15
Standard Liège	2018–19	Belgian Pro League	28	12	1	0	8 (Note: Two appearances and one goal in UEFA Champions League, six appearances and two goals in UEFA Europa League)	3	7 (Note: One appearance in Belgian Super Cup, six appearances and one goal in Belgian Pro League play-offs)	1	44	16
Standard Liège	2019–20	Belgian Pro League	14	7	1	0	5 (Note: Appearances in UEFA Europa League)	0	—		20	7
Standard Liège	Total		89	27	12	6	13	3	25	7	139	43
Nantes	2019–20	Ligue 1	6	0	1	1	—		—		7	1
Nantes	2020–21	Ligue 1	22	2	0	0	—		1 (Note: Appearance in Ligue 1 relegation/promotion play-offs)	0	23	2
Nantes	2021–22	Ligue 1	6	0	2	0	—		—		8	0
Nantes	Total		34	2	3	1	—		1	0	38	3
Standard Liège	2021–22	Belgian Pro League	11	2	0	0	—		—		11	2
Standard Liège	2022–23	Belgian Pro League	16	3	0	0	—		—		16	3
Standard Liège	2023–24	Belgian Pro League	3	0	1	1	—		—		4	1
Standard Liège	Total		30	5	1	1	—		—		31	6
Eupen	2023–24	Belgian Pro League	9	2	—		—		—		9	2
Career total			288	95	25	9	13	3	35	10	361	117

== Honours ==
Standard Liège

- Belgian Cup: 2015–16, 2017–18

Individual

- Omnisports' Personality of the Year: 2015
- Belgian Cup Final Man of the Match: 2017–18
