= Nathan Ngoy =

Belgian footballer (born 2003)

- Ngoy with Belgium in 2026

Personal information
- Date of birth: 10 June 2003 (age 23)
- Place of birth: Brussels, Belgium
- Height: 1.83 m (6 ft 0 in)
- Position: Defender

Team information
- Current team: Lille
- Number: 3

Youth career
- –2019: Anderlecht
- 2019–2020: Standard Liège

Senior career*
Years	Team	Apps	(Gls)
2020–2025	Standard Liège	50	(1)
2025–	Lille	37	(1)

International career^{‡}
2018–2019	Belgium U16	4	(0)
2019–2020	Belgium U17	3	(0)
2021–2022	Belgium U19	8	(0)
2026–	Belgium	14	(1)
- * Club domestic league appearances and goals as of 30 October 2026 ‡ National team caps and goals as of 15 November 2026

Nathan Ngoy (born 10 June 2003) is a Belgian professional footballer who plays as a defender for Ligue 1 club Lille and the Belgium national team.

== Club career ==
Originally from Molenbeek, Nathan Ngoy started playing football in the street with friends, and showing natural talent joined FC Brussels as a schoolboy in the early 2010s, only for the club to fold. Ngoy moved to the Anderlecht academy, before joining Standard Liège in 2019. Along with fellow defender Allan Delferrière, Mbaye Leye started selecting Ngoy in the professional squad at the end of the 2020–21 season.

He made his professional debut for Standard Liège on 22 May 2021, during the last match of the Division 1A season against Oostende. Despite the 1–3 home loss, Ngoy was among the few bright spot for Standard, playing the whole game as a central defender and stopping several goal occasions from Oostende.

The young defender subsequently signed his first professional contract with the club from Liège, tying him to the Standard until 2024. Appearing as one of the most promising prospect of Belgian football, he entered the 2021–22 season challenging for a place in the professional squad as a center-back, along with other youngster Ameen Al Dakhil.

Ngoy's first professional goal was the winner to complete a comeback from 2–0 down to beat eternal rivals Anderlecht in a Belgian Clasico contest at the Sclessin on 22 October 2023.

On 24 July 2025, Ngoy joined Lille in France for four years.

== International career ==
Ngoy playing for Belgium at the 2026 FIFA World Cup

Of Congolese descent, Nathan Ngoy is a youth international with Belgium at under-17 and under-19 level.

Ngoy earned his first call-up with the Under-21s for a 1–1 draw with Spain in November 2023, but did not come on.

On 15 May 2026, he was named in Belgium's squad for the 2026 FIFA World Cup.

== Career statistics ==
=== Club ===
As of match played 3 November 2026

Appearances and goals by club, season and competition
Club	Season	League			National cup (Note: Includes Belgian Cup, Coupe de France)		Europe		Other		Total	
Club	Season	Division	Apps	Goals	Apps	Goals	Apps	Goals	Apps	Goals	Apps	Goals
Standard Liège	2020–21	Belgian Pro League	1	0	0	0	—		—		1	0
Standard Liège	2021–22	Belgian Pro League	11	0	1	0	—		—		12	0
Standard Liège	2022–23	Belgian Pro League	7	0	0	0	—		—		7	0
Standard Liège	2023–24	Belgian Pro League	15	1	2	0	—		—		17	1
Standard Liège	2024–25	Belgian Pro League	16	0	0	0	—		—		16	0
Standard Liège	Total		50	1	3	0	—		—		53	1
Lille	2025–26	Ligue 1	29	1	1	1	8 (Note: Appearances in UEFA Europa League)	1	—		38	3
Lille	2026–27	Ligue 1	8	0	0	0	4 (Note: Appearances in UEFA Champions League)	0	—		12	0
Lille	Total		37	1	1	1	12	1	—		50	3
Career total			87	2	4	1	12	1	0	0	103	4

=== International ===
As of match played 15 November 2026

Appearances and goals by national team and year
National team	Year	Apps	Goals
Belgium	2026	14	1
Total		14	1

As of match played 15 November 2026
Scores and results list Belgium's goal tally first, score column indicates score after each Ngoy goal.

List of international goals scored by Nathan Ngoy
No.	Date	Venue	Cap	Opponent	Score	Result	Competition
1	15 November 2026	King Baudouin Stadium, Brussels, Belgium	14	Italy	2–1	4–1	2026–27 UEFA Nations League A
