= Noah Ohio =

Dutch footballer (born 2003)

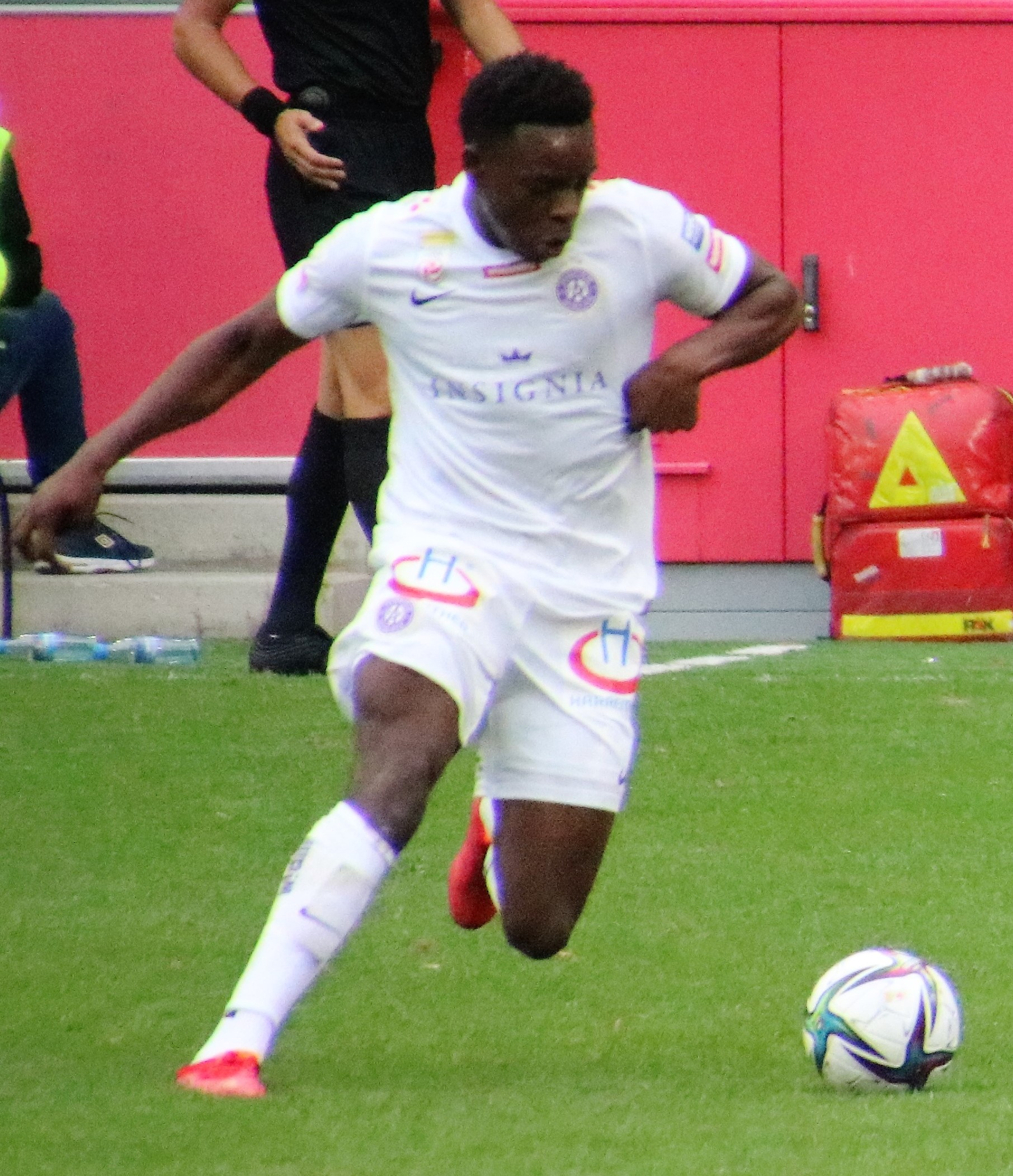
- Ohio playing for Austria Wien in 2021

Personal information
- Full name: Noah Chidiebere Junior Anyanwu Ohio
- Date of birth: 16 January 2003 (age 23)
- Place of birth: Almere, Netherlands
- Height: 1.83 m (6 ft 0 in)
- Position: Forward

Team information
- Current team: Utrecht

Youth career
- –2015: FC Almere
- 2015–2016: Manchester United
- 2016–2019: Manchester City
- 2019–2021: RB Leipzig

Senior career*
Years	Team	Apps	(Gls)
2021–2022	RB Leipzig	0	(0)
2021	→ Vitesse (loan)	4	(0)
2021	→ Austria Wien II (loan)	1	(0)
2021–2022	→ Austria Wien (loan)	30	(5)
2022	Standard Liège II	4	(2)
2022–2024	Standard Liège	41	(5)
2024	→ Hull City (loan)	8	(3)
2024–	Utrecht	26	(5)
2025–	Jong Utrecht	11	(11)
2026	→ Valladolid (loan)	4	(0)

International career^{‡}
2018	Netherlands U15	3	(2)
2018–2019	Netherlands U16	4	(4)
2018–2019	England U16	6	(1)
2022	Netherlands U19	3	(1)
2023–2025	Netherlands U21	22	(9)
- * Club domestic league appearances and goals as of 9 June 2026 ‡ National team caps and goals as of 23:05, 25 June 2025 (UTC)

Noah Chidiebere Junior Anyanwu Ohio (born 16 January 2003) is a Dutch professional footballer who plays as a forward for Eredivisie club Utrecht.

== Club career ==
Born in the Netherlands, Ohio joined Manchester United in 2015 before joining Manchester City the following year. In June 2019, he agreed to join the youth academy of Bundesliga side RB Leipzig. In January 2021, Ohio joined Eredivisie side Vitesse on an 18-month loan deal. On 27 January 2021, he made his professional debut, coming on as a late substitute in a defeat against VVV-Venlo.

On 14 July 2022, Ohio joined Standard Liège on a four-year contract.

On 30 January 2024. he moved on loan to English cub Hull City. He made his debut for the club as a 74th-minute substitute for Anass Zaroury on 3 February in the home 1–0 win against Millwall. On his second appearance on 13 February, as a 67th-minute substitute for Zaroury he scored the winning goal in a 2–1 away match against Rotherham United. In July 2024, Ohio joined Eredivisie side Utrecht on a three-year deal.

On 22 January 2026, Ohio was loan to Spanish club Real Valladolid until the end of the season.

== International career ==
Ohio was born in the Netherlands to Igbo Nigerian parents and moved to England at a young age. Ohio is eligible to play for Nigeria, England, and the Netherlands at international level. He played for Netherlands U15 in 2018 before representing both England and the Netherlands at under-16 level the following year. He represented the Netherlands at the U19 and U21 levels, including scoring seven goals in nine U21 European championship qualifying matches.

== Career statistics ==
As of match played 22 January 2026

Appearances and goals by club, season and competition
Club	Season	League			National cup (Note: Includes Austrian Cup, Belgian Cup, KNVB Cup)		Europe		Total	
Club	Season	Division	Apps	Goals	Apps	Goals	Apps	Goals	Apps	Goals
RB Leipzig	2021–22	Bundesliga	0	0	0	0	0	0	0	0
Vitesse (loan)	2020–21	Eredivisie	4	0	0	0	—		4	0
Austria Wien (loan)	2021–22	Austrian Bundesliga	30	5	1	1	—		31	6
Austria Wien II (loan)	2021–22	Austrian Football Second League	1	0	—		—		1	0
Standard Liège	2022–23	Belgian Pro League	27	5	2	0	—		29	5
Standard Liège	2023–24	Belgian Pro League	14	0	2	1	—		16	1
Standard Liège	Total		41	5	4	1	—		45	6
Standard Liège II	2022–23	Challenger Pro League	4	2	—		—		4	2
Hull City (loan)	2023–24	Championship	8	3	—		—		8	3
Utrecht	2024–25	Eredivisie	24	5	2	0	—		26	5
Utrecht	2025–26	Eredivisie	2	0	0	0	4 (Note: Appearances in UEFA Europa League)	0	6	0
Utrecht	Total		26	5	2	0	4	0	32	5
Jong Utrecht	2024–25	Eerste Divisie	3	2	—		—		3	2
Jong Utrecht	2025–26	Eerste Divisie	8	9	—		—		8	9
Jong Utrecht	Total		11	11	—		—		11	11
Valladolid (loan)	2025–26	Segunda Division	0	0	—		—		0	0
Career total			125	31	7	2	4	0	136	33
