= Marlon Fossey =

American soccer player

Personal information
- Full name: Marlon Joseph Fossey
- Date of birth: September 9, 1998 (age 28)
- Place of birth: Los Angeles, California, United States
- Height: 5 ft 10 in (1.79 m)
- Position: Right-back

Team information
- Current team: Standard Liège
- Number: 13

Youth career
- 2009–2020: Fulham

Senior career*
Years	Team	Apps	(Gls)
2020–2022	Fulham	0	(0)
2020	→ Shrewsbury Town (loan)	7	(0)
2022	→ Bolton Wanderers (loan)	15	(1)
2022–	Standard Liège	108	(6)

International career^{‡}
2016–2017	United States U20	8	(0)
2024–	United States	2	(0)
- * Club domestic league appearances and goals as of May 23, 2026 ‡ National team caps and goals as of March 23, 2025

Marlon Joseph Fossey (born November 9, 1998) is an American professional soccer player who plays as a right-back for Belgian Pro League club Standard Liège and the United States national team.

== Early and personal life ==
Born in Los Angeles, California, Fossey moved to his mother's birthplace, the island of Jersey, with his family at age 4. At age 11, he moved to England. As a result, he holds both American and British citizenships.

== Club career ==
Fossey began his youth career with Fulham at the age of 11 after being spotted by a club scout while playing in a youth tournament in Jersey, however his youth career was marred by injury. He moved on loan to Shrewsbury Town in August 2020. He made his debut for The Shrews on September 4, coming on as an 81st minute substitution for Donald Love in a 4–3 away defeat at Middlesbrough in the EFL Cup. On December 29, 2020, it was announced that his loan deal had ended.

He signed a new two-year contract with Fulham in June 2021. On January 3, 2022, Fossey joined Bolton Wanderers on loan for the remainder of the 2021–22 season. He turned down an offer from Inter Miami, preferring to sign for Bolton on loan instead. On March 18 it was confirmed that Fossey had returned to Fulham after a torn meniscus in his left knee, that he suffered the previous weekend against Plymouth Argyle, had ended his season.

In September 2022 he signed for Belgian club Standard Liège.

== International career ==
Fossey has represented the United States at under-20 youth level. He received his first call up to the senior United States national team to prepare for the 2019 CONCACAF Gold Cup.

Fossey made his debut for the senior team on September 10, 2024, in a friendly against New Zealand at the TQL Stadium. He played the whole game in a 1–1 draw.

== Playing style ==
Fossey began his career as a winger but was converted into a full back, playing primarily on the right.

== Career statistics ==
=== Club ===
As of May 23, 2026

Appearances and goals by club, season and competition
Club	Season	League			National cup		League cup		Other		Total	
Club	Season	Division	Apps	Goals	Apps	Goals	Apps	Goals	Apps	Goals	Apps	Goals
Fulham	2020–21	Premier League	0	0	0	0	0	0	—		0	0
Fulham	2021–22	Championship	0	0	0	0	0	0	—		0	0
Fulham	2022–23	Premier League	0	0	0	0	1	0	—		1	0
Fulham	Total		0	0	0	0	1	0	0	0	1	0
Shrewsbury Town (loan)	2020–21	League One	7	0	0	0	1	0	1 (Note: Appearance(s) in the EFL Trophy)	0	9	0
Bolton Wanderers (loan)	2021–22	League One	15	1	0	0	0	0	1	0	16	1
Standard Liège	2022–23	Belgian Pro League	26	4	2	0	—		—		28	4
Standard Liège	2023–24	Belgian Pro League	30	1	2	0	—		—		32	1
Standard Liège	2024–25	Belgian Pro League	32	0	2	0	—		—		34	0
Standard Liège	2025–26	Belgian Pro League	20	1	1	0	—		—		21	1
Standard Liège	Total		108	6	7	0	—		—		115	6
Career total			130	7	7	0	2	0	2	0	141	7

=== International ===
As of match played March 23, 2025

Appearances and goals by national team and year
National team	Year	Apps	Goals
United States	2024	1	0
United States	2025	1	0
Total		2	0

== Honors ==
United States U20

- CONCACAF Under-20 Championship: 2017
