= Daouda Peeters =

Belgian footballer (born 1999)

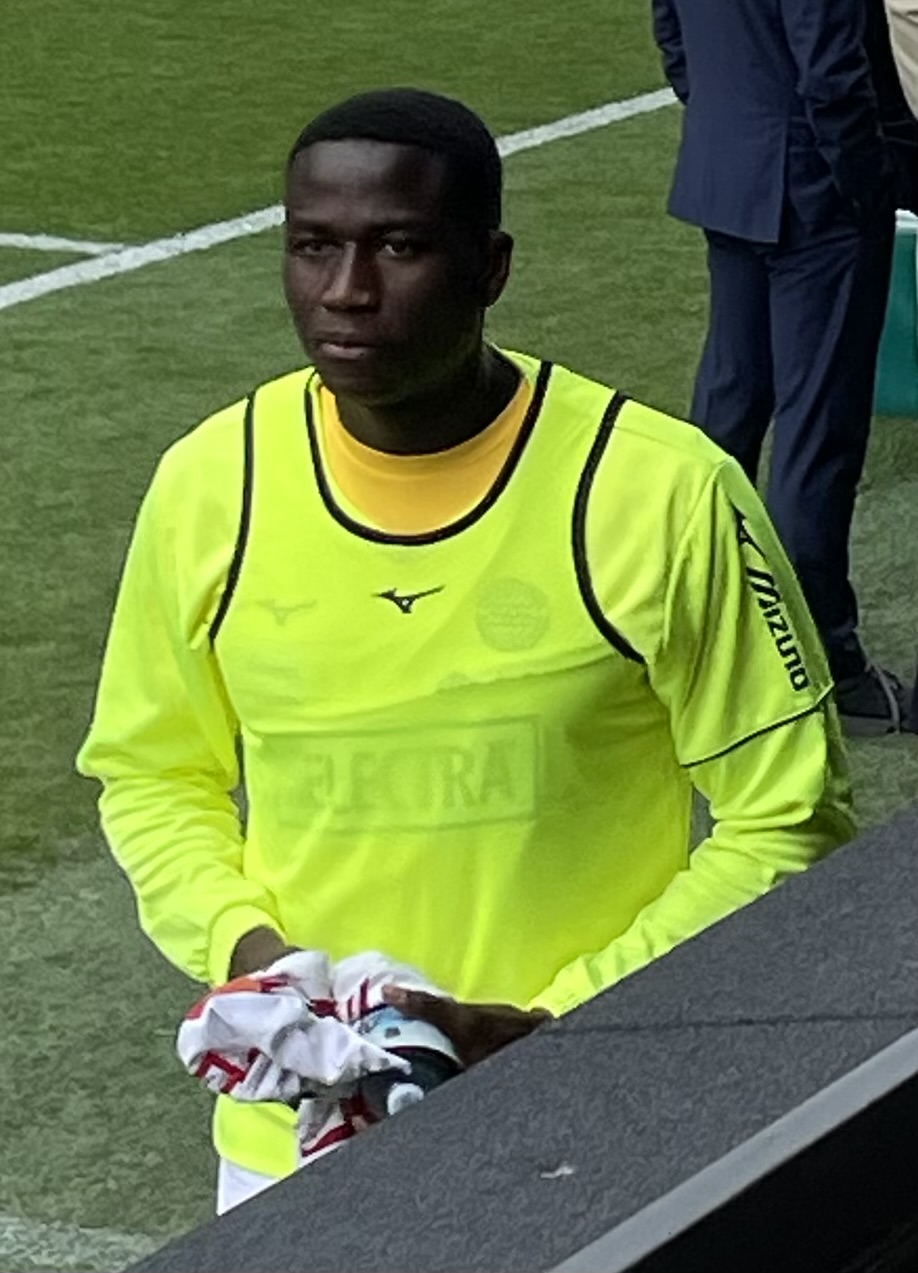

Personal information
- Date of birth: 26 January 1999 (age 27)
- Place of birth: Kamsar, Guinea
- Height: 1.85 m (6 ft 1 in)
- Position: Midfielder

Youth career
- –2015: Lierse
- 2015–2018: Club Brugge
- 2018–2019: Sampdoria

Senior career*
Years	Team	Apps	(Gls)
2019–2025	Juventus	1	(0)
2019–2025	→ Juventus Next Gen (Note: The team's name was changed from Juventus U23 to Juventus Next Gen in August 2022.) (res.)	55	(0)
2021–2022	→ Standard Liège (loan)	5	(0)
2023–2024	→ Südtirol (loan)	19	(0)
2025	Las Vegas Lights	8	(0)

International career^{‡}
2015	Belgium U16	7	(0)
2015–2016	Belgium U17	15	(0)
2017	Belgium U18	4	(0)
2016–2017	Belgium U19	3	(0)
2019–2020	Belgium U21	4	(0)
- * Club domestic league appearances and goals as of 11:58, 4 September 2025 (UTC) ‡ National team caps and goals as of 18:23, 12 October 2020 (UTC)

Daouda Peeters (born 26 January 1999) is a professional footballer who plays as a midfielder. Born in Guinea, he has represented Belgium at youth level.

Born in Guinea, Peeters holds Belgian citizenship and has represented Belgium internationally at youth level since 2015.

== Club career ==
=== Juventus ===
Peeters made his Serie A debut, as well as his senior Juventus debut, in a 2–0 away defeat to Cagliari on 29 July 2020. He also became the first Belgian player to play for Juventus.

=== Loan to Standard Liège ===
On 19 August 2021, Peeters was loaned to Belgian side Standard Liège. On 4 November, he was diagnosed a neuropathy. In March 2023, he returned training with Juventus Next Gen, after his loan spell in Belgium. On 2 April, he received his first call up after the injury. During the last weeks of the season, he started training with the team.

=== Loan to Südtirol ===
On 7 July 2023, he joined Südtirol on loan.

=== Las Vegas Lights ===
On 19 February 2025, Peeters signed a two-year contract with Las Vegas Lights in the USL Championship. Following the 2025 season, Las Vegas opted to buyout Peeters' contract with the club and made him a free agent.

== Career statistics ==
=== Club ===
As of match played 1 October 2021

Club	Season	League			National cup		Continental		Other		Total	
Club	Season	Division	Apps	Goals	Apps	Goals	Apps	Goals	Apps	Goals	Apps	Goals
Juventus U23	2019–20	Serie C	16	0	—		—		6 (Note: Two appearances in Serie C promotion play-offs, four appearances in the Coppa Italia Serie C)	0	22	0
Juventus U23	2020–21	Serie C	28	0	—		—		2 (Note: Appearances in Serie C promotion play-offs)	0	30	0
Juventus U23	Total		44	0	0	0	0	0	8	0	52	0
Juventus	2019–20	Serie A	1	0	0	0	0	0	—		1	0
Juventus	2020–21	Serie A	0	0	0	0	0	0	—		0	0
Juventus	Total		1	0	0	0	0	0	0	0	1	0
Standard Liège (loan)	2021–22	First Division A	5	0	0	0	0	0	0	0	5	0
FC Südtirol	2023–24	Serie B	19	0	0	0	0	0	0	0	0	0
Career total			50	0	0	0	0	0	8	0	58	0

== Honours ==
Juventus U23

- Coppa Italia Serie C: 2019–20

Juventus

- Serie A: 2019–20
