= Denis Drăguș =

Romanian footballer (born 1999)

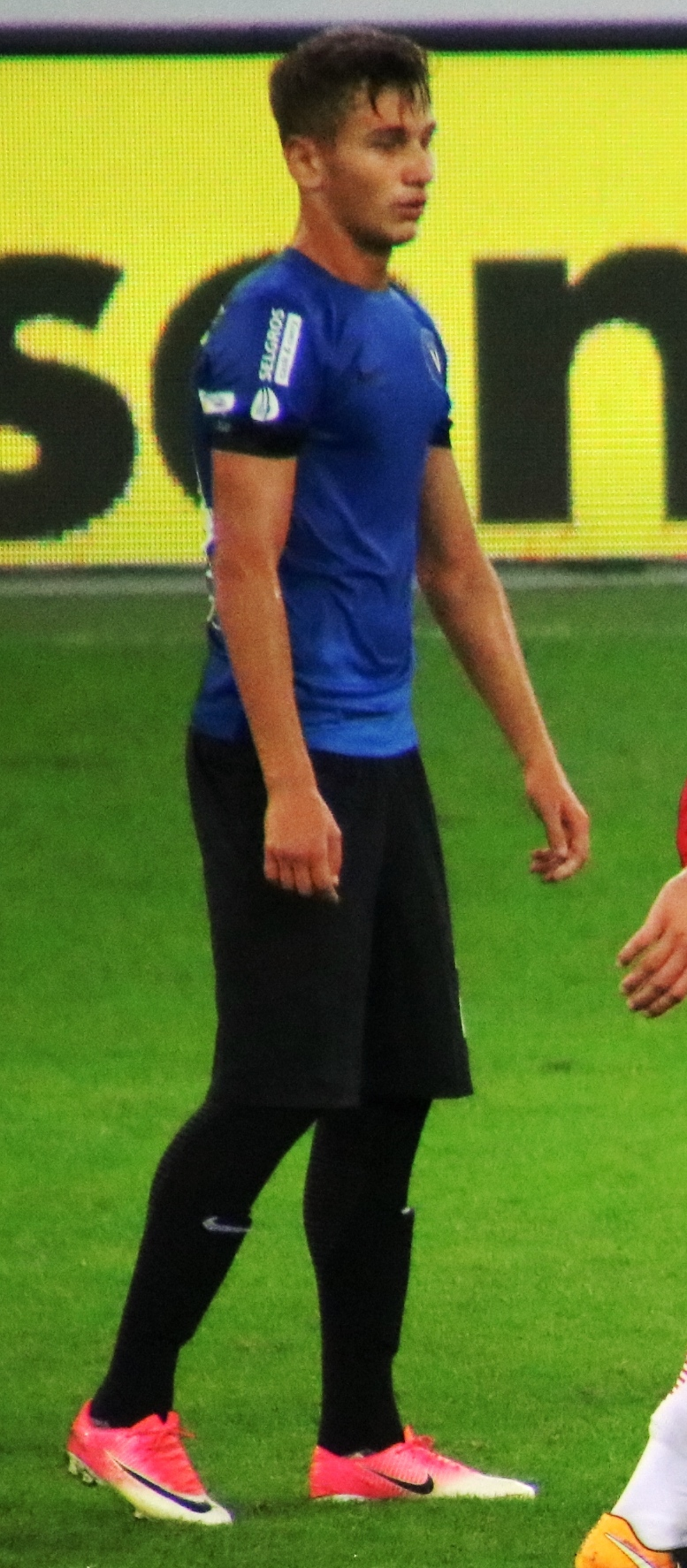
- Drăguș with Viitorul Constanța in 2017

Personal information
- Full name: Denis Mihai Drăguș
- Date of birth: 6 July 1999 (age 27)
- Place of birth: Bucharest, Romania
- Height: 1.84 m (6 ft 0 in)
- Position: Forward

Team information
- Current team: FCSB
- Number: 10

Youth career
- 2010–2012: Sfântul Pantelimon
- 2012–2014: Pro Luceafărul București
- 2014–2017: Gheorghe Hagi Academy

Senior career*
Years	Team	Apps	(Gls)
2015–2019	Viitorul Constanța	46	(8)
2019–2024	Standard Liège	55	(11)
2020–2021	→ Crotone (loan)	9	(0)
2023	→ Genoa (loan)	5	(0)
2023–2024	→ Gaziantep (loan)	32	(14)
2024–2026	Trabzonspor	18	(2)
2025–2026	→ Eyüpspor (loan)	12	(0)
2026	→ Gaziantep (loan)	11	(0)
2026–	FCSB	5	(0)

International career^{‡}
2016	Romania U18	3	(0)
2018	Romania U19	3	(0)
2018–2020	Romania U21	8	(2)
2018–	Romania	28	(7)
- * Club domestic league appearances and goals as of 22 November 2026 ‡ National team caps and goals as of 6 June 2026

Denis Mihai Drăguș (Romanian pronunciation: [ˈdenis miˈhaj drəˈguʃ]; born 6 July 1999) is a Romanian professional footballer who plays as a forward for Liga I club FCSB, which he captains, and the Romania national team.

Drăguș began his senior career at Viitorul Constanța, before moving abroad to Belgian club Standard Liège in 2019. After several loan spells in Italy and Turkey, he transferred to Trabzonspor in 2024. Two years later, Drăguș returned to Romania at FCSB.

Internationally, Drăguș recorded his full debut for Romania in September 2018, in a 2–2 draw with Serbia. He represented his country in the UEFA Euro 2024, achieving first place in their group and advancing to the round of 16.

== Club career ==
=== Viitorul Constanța ===
Born in Bucharest, Drăguș joined the academy of Viitorul Constanța in 2014. He made his senior debut for the club on 29 October 2015, aged 16, coming on as a 85th-minute substitute for Adnan Aganović in a 1–0 Cupa României win over Botoșani.

Drăguș recorded his debut in European competitions on 24 August 2017, replacing George Țucudean in the 24th minute of a 0–4 away loss to Red Bull Salzburg counting for the UEFA Europa League play-off round. Three days later, he played his first Liga I game, also coming off the bench in a 1–2 loss to Concordia Chiajna.

On 28 November 2017, Drăguș scored his first career goal in a 2–3 away defeat to Botoșani in the national cup. He netted his first Europa League goal on 12 July 2018, opening a 2–0 away victory over Racing FC in the first qualifying round. On the 26th that month, he scored both goals in a 2–2 second qualifying round draw with Vitesse, and one week later scored again in a 1–3 away loss at the GelreDome.

Drăguș became a regular starter at Viitorul Constanța in the 2018–19 season, during which he amassed 31 matches and seven goals in the league championship.

=== Standard Liège ===
On 7 August 2019, Drăguș joined Belgian team Standard Liège in a deal reportedly worth €2 million plus 30% interest on a future transfer. He recorded his debut for Les Rouches on 1 September 2019, in a 0–1 loss to rivals Anderlecht at the Constant Vanden Stock Stadium.

On 15 September 2020, Drăguș agreed to a one-season loan with an option to buy at Crotone. He made his Serie A debut five days later, in a 4–1 defeat to Genoa. Drăguș made a total of nine appearances during his time in Italy, starting only once. Upon his return to Liège, he netted his first goal for Standard in a 5–2 loss to Antwerp on 8 August 2021.

On 16 January 2022, Drăguș scored an 89th-minute equaliser in a 1–1 draw at Anderlecht. He achieved his highest goal tally at Standard in the 2021–22 campaign, amassing six goals from 28 league appearances. Drăguș moved on loan with an option to buy to Serie B club Genoa on 26 January 2023, but appeared sparringly during his five months at the club.

On 13 September 2023, amid rumours of a transfer to Rapid București in his home country, Standard sent Drăguș on a season-long loan to Süper Lig team Gaziantep. Deployed as a main striker by his coach and compatriot Marius Șumudică, he played 32 games and scored 14 goals in the national championship.

=== Trabzonspor ===
On 25 June 2024, Turkish side Trabzonspor transferred Drăguș for a rumoured fee of €1.7 million. He registered his debut on 25 July, in a 2–0 away win over Ružomberok in the Europa League second qualifying round, and one week later scored the only goal of the second leg.

Drăguș scored his first Süper Lig goal for Trabzonspor on 30 November 2024, opening the scoring in the eighth minute of a 1–2 away defeat to Alanyaspor. On 6 April 2025, on his first start of the year, he scored in a 1–4 league defeat to Fenerbahçe.

On 18 July 2025, following an unconvincing debut campaign at Trabzonspor, Drăguș joined fellow Süper Lig side Eyüpspor on a one-year loan deal. After making twelve appearances without scoring, his loan was terminated early. He then returned to Gaziantep on a short-term loan for the remainder of the season, scoring two goals in twelve appearances in all competitions.

In August 2026, Trabzonspor president Ertuğrul Doğan announced that Drăguș was no longer part of the club's plans, amid reports linking him with a move to Romanian team FCSB.

=== FCSB ===
On 4 September 2026, Drăguș returned to Romania by signing a three-year contract with FCSB. He was offered a salary of €1 million per season, which reportedly made him the highest-paid player in the history of Liga I at the time.

== International career ==
Drăguș made his senior debut for the Romania national team on 10 September 2018, appearing in a 2–2 UEFA Nations League draw with Serbia. The following year, he was set to represent the under-21 side at the 2019 European Championship, but was ruled out due to a calcaneus fracture.

Drăguș scored his first senior international goal on 17 November 2022, in a 1–2 friendly defeat to Slovenia at Cluj Arena, and three days later added another in a 5–0 win away to Moldova.

In June 2024, Drăguș was named in Romania's squad for Euro 2024. At the tournament, he scored in the 3–0 victory over Ukraine in their opening group match, helping secure the country's first European Championship win in 24 years. He featured in all four of Romania's matches, as the team topped its group before being eliminated by the Netherlands in the round of 16.

In 2025, Drăguș was involved in Romania's 2026 World Cup qualifying campaign, notably scoring twice in the opening 20 minutes of a 2–2 draw with Cyprus on 9 September, and being sent off one minute after coming on as a substitute in a 3–1 defeat to Bosnia and Herzegovina on 15 November. Romania ultimately finished third in their group but advanced to the second round via their Nations League ranking, where they were eliminated by Turkey.

== Style of play ==
Drăguș is a dynamic and versatile forward, beginning his career as a winger but also performing proficiently as a main striker. According to his Trabzonspor coach Şenol Güneş, he possesses a combination of talent, physical strength, and speed, which makes him a constant threat to opposing defences. Güneş also noted that while Drăguș excels in one-on-one situations and frequently finds himself in goalscoring opportunities, his finishing can be inconsistent.

== Personal life ==
Drăguș's father, Mihai, was also a professional footballer, playing in Romania, South Korea and Russia. Drăguș and his wife, Vanessa, have two children. They have been together since childhood and married in Ciolpani on 10 July 2024, with national teammate Marius Marin as their godfather. The couple has also been noted for acting as godparents to and providing financial support for several orphaned and abandoned children.

Drăguș was estranged from his parents for five years, reportedly following their initial disapproval of his decision to start a family at a young age. His parents were absent from his wedding in 2024, but the estrangement ended in November 2024 when they attended Romania's 4–1 victory over Cyprus at the Arena Națională and reconciled with their son.

== Career statistics ==
=== Club ===
As of match played 22 November 2026

Appearances and goals by club, season and competition
Club	Season	League			National cup (Note: Includes Cupa României, Belgian Cup, Turkish Cup)		Continental		Other		Total	
Club	Season	Division	Apps	Goals	Apps	Goals	Apps	Goals	Apps	Goals	Apps	Goals
Viitorul Constanța	2015–16	Liga I	0	0	1	0	—		—		1	0
Viitorul Constanța	2017–18	Liga I	14	1	1	1	1 (Note: Appearance(s) in UEFA Europa League)	0	—		16	2
Viitorul Constanța	2018–19	Liga I	31	7	3	0	4	4	—		38	11
Viitorul Constanța	2019–20	Liga I	1	0	—		1	0	—		2	0
Viitorul Constanța	Total		46	8	5	1	6	4	—		57	13
Standard Liège	2019–20	Belgian First Division A	2	0	2	0	0	0	—		4	0
Standard Liège	2021–22	Belgian First Division A	28	6	2	0	—		—		30	6
Standard Liège	2022–23	Belgian First Division A	19	4	2	0	—		—		21	4
Standard Liège	2023–24	Belgian First Division A	6	1	—		—		—		6	1
Standard Liège	Total		55	11	6	0	0	0	—		61	11
Crotone (loan)	2020–21	Serie A	9	0	0	0	—		—		9	0
Genoa (loan)	2022–23	Serie B	5	0	—		—		—		5	0
Gaziantep (loan)	2023–24	Süper Lig	32	14	3	1	—		—		35	15
Trabzonspor	2024–25	Süper Lig	18	2	2	0	6 (Note: Four appearances and one goal in UEFA Europa League, two appearances in UEFA Conference League)	1	—		26	3
Trabzonspor	2026–27	Süper Lig	0	0	—		0	0	—		0	0
Trabzonspor	Total		18	2	2	0	6	1	—		26	3
Eyüpspor (loan)	2025–26	Süper Lig	12	0	0	0	—		—		12	0
Gaziantep (loan)	2025–26	Süper Lig	11	0	1	2	—		—		12	2
FCSB	2026–27	Liga I	5	0	0	0	—		—		5	0
Career total			193	35	17	4	12	5	—		222	44

=== International ===
As of match played 6 June 2026

Appearances and goals by national team and year
National team	Year	Apps	Goals
Romania	2018	2	0
Romania	2022	3	2
Romania	2023	3	0
Romania	2024	12	3
Romania	2025	7	2
Romania	2026	1	0
Total		28	7

Scores and results list Romania's goal tally first, score column indicates score after each Drăguș goal.

List of international goals scored by Denis Drăguș
No.	Date	Venue	Opponent	Score	Result	Competition
1.	17 November 2022	Cluj Arena, Cluj-Napoca, Romania	Slovenia	1–2	1–2	Friendly
2.	20 November 2022	Zimbru Stadium, Chișinău, Moldova	Moldova	2–0	5–0	Friendly
3.	17 June 2024	Allianz Arena, Munich, Germany	Ukraine	3–0	3–0	UEFA Euro 2024
4.	6 September 2024	Fadil Vokrri Stadium, Pristina, Kosovo	Kosovo	3–0	3–0	2024–25 UEFA Nations League C
5.	15 October 2024	Darius and Girėnas Stadium, Kaunas, Lithuania	Lithuania	2–1	2–1	2024–25 UEFA Nations League C
6.	9 September 2025	GSP Stadium, Nicosia, Cyprus	Cyprus	1–0	2–2	2026 FIFA World Cup qualification
7.	9 September 2025	GSP Stadium, Nicosia, Cyprus	Cyprus	2–0	2–2	2026 FIFA World Cup qualification

== Honours ==
Viitorul Constanța

- Cupa României: 2018–19
- Supercupa României: 2019

Trabzonspor

- Turkish Cup runner-up: 2024–25
