= Lucas Noubi =

Belgian footballer

Personal information
- Full name: Lucas Dominique Noubi Ngnokam
- Date of birth: 15 January 2005 (age 21)
- Place of birth: Mouscron, Belgium
- Height: 1.80 m (5 ft 11 in)
- Position: Centre-back

Team information
- Current team: Deportivo A Coruña
- Number: 4

Youth career
- Mouscron
- 2015–2021: Standard Liège

Senior career*
Years	Team	Apps	(Gls)
2021–2025	Standard Liège	43	(0)
2022–2025	SL16 FC	42	(0)
2025–	Deportivo A Coruña	28	(1)

International career^{‡}
2020	Belgium U15	2	(0)
2021–2022	Belgium U17	8	(0)
2021–2023	Belgium U18	9	(0)
2023–2024	Belgium U19	9	(1)
2025–	Belgium U21	9	(0)
- * Club domestic league appearances and goals as of 31 May 2026 ‡ National team caps and goals as of 15:32, 18 November 2026 (UTC)

Lucas Dominique Noubi Ngnokam (born 15 January 2005) is a Belgian professional footballer who plays as a centre-back for La Liga club Deportivo de A Coruña.

== Club career ==
=== Standard Liège ===
Lucas Noubi joined the Standard Liège academy in 2015, from Mouscron.

He made his professional debut for Standard Liège on 13 March 2022, starting the Division 1A derby against Seraing as a centre-back.

=== Deportivo A Coruña ===
On 1 July 2025, Noubi signed a four-year contract with Spanish side Deportivo de A Coruña of the Segunda División.

== International career ==
Born in Belgium, Noubi is of Cameroonian descent. He is a youth international for Belgium, playing with the Under-17s and he was the captain during the 2021–22 season.
