= William Balikwisha =

Congolese footballer

Personal information
- Full name: William Muhoya Balikwisha
- Date of birth: 12 May 1999 (age 27)
- Place of birth: Brussels, Belgium
- Height: 1.74 m (5 ft 9 in)
- Position: Winger

Team information
- Current team: OH Leuven
- Number: 21

Youth career
- 2003–2014: Anderlecht
- 2014–2018: Standard Liège

Senior career*
Years	Team	Apps	(Gls)
2018–2024	Standard Liège	64	(7)
2019	→ Cercle Brugge (loan)	4	(0)
2020	→ MVV Maastricht (loan)	7	(0)
2022	SL16 FC	1	(0)
2024–	OH Leuven	52	(3)

International career^{‡}
2019	DR Congo U23	2	(0)
2023–	DR Congo	1	(0)
- * Club domestic league appearances and goals as of 19 September 2026 ‡ National team caps and goals as of 05:57, 31 March 2023 (UTC)

William Buhoya Balikwisha (born 12 May 1999) is a professional footballer who plays as a winger for OH Leuven. Born in Belgium, he represents DR Congo internationally.

== Club career ==
Balikwisha joined Anderlecht's youth academy at the age of 4, and moved to Standard Liège in 2014. Balikwisha made his professional debut for Standard in a 3–0 Belgian First Division A win over Lokeren on 18 August 2018.

On 9 August 2019, he joined Cercle Brugge on a one-season loan.

== International career ==
Born in Belgium, Balikwisha is of Congolese descent. Balikwisha represented the DR Congo U23s for a pair of 2019 Africa U-23 Cup of Nations qualification matches in March 2019. He debuted for the senior DR Congo national team in a 3–1 2023 Africa Cup of Nations qualification win over Mauritania on 24 March 2023.

== Personal life ==
Balikwisha is the brother of the footballer Michel-Ange Balikwisha.
