= Alexandro Calut =

Belgian footballer

Personal information
- Date of birth: 22 April 2003 (age 23)
- Place of birth: Charleroi, Belgium
- Height: 1.80 m (5 ft 11 in)
- Position: Left back

Youth career
- Standard Liège

Senior career*
| Years | Team | Apps | (Gls) |
| 2021–2026 | Standard Liège | 34 | (0) |
| 2022–2023 | SL16 FC | 22 | (2) |
| 2023–2024 | → OH Leuven (loan) | 0 | (0) |

International career^{‡}
| 2019–2020 | Belgium U17 | 4 | (1) |
- * Club domestic league appearances and goals as of 23 May 2026 ‡ National team caps and goals as of 9 May 2021

Alexandro Calut (born 22 April 2003) is a Belgian professional footballer who plays as a left back.

== Club career ==
Calut made his professional debut with Standard Liège in a 2–1 Belgian First Division A win against Gent on 8 May 2021.
