= Cihan Çanak =

Belgian footballer

Personal information
- Date of birth: 24 January 2005 (age 21)
- Place of birth: Verviers, Belgium
- Height: 1.75 m (5 ft 9 in)
- Position: Left winger

Team information
- Current team: Trabzonspor
- Number: 61

Youth career
- Standard Liège

Senior career*
Years	Team	Apps	(Gls)
2021–2024	Standard Liège	70	(1)
2021–2023	SL16 FC	5	(0)
2024–	Trabzonspor	27	(0)
2026	→ Gençlerbirliği (loan)	14	(0)

International career^{‡}
2020	Belgium U15	2	(1)
2022	Belgium U17	8	(0)
2023	Belgium U19	3	(0)
2022	Belgium U20	1	(0)
2023–	Turkey U21	10	(3)
- * Club domestic league appearances and goals as of 1 June 2026 ‡ National team caps and goals as of 11 October 2024

Cihan Çanak (born 24 January 2005) is a professional footballer who plays for Trabzonspor. Born in Belgium, he represented it on junior levels before switching allegiance to Turkey.

== Early life ==
Çanak is from Verviers, in the Wallonian province of Liège, with his family being of Turkish origins.

== Club career ==
Cihan Çanak first joined Standard de Liège's first team during the summer 2021 pre-season, before signing a new contract with the club the following October. He made his professional debut for the Standard on 26 December 2021, replacing Niels Nkounkou in the last minutes of a 0–1 home Division 1A defeat against Zulte-Waregem.

On 28 June 2024, Çanak signed a contract with Trabzonspor for three years with an option for a fourth year. On his Trabzonsport debut on 25 July 2024 in a Europa League qualifier against Ružomberok, he scored the second goal in a 2–0 victory.

== International career ==
Already an international with Belgium under-15s, Cihan Çanak was also selected with the under-17 in October 2021, whilst also being called for Turkey youth teams, from the under-14 to the under-17.

== Personal life ==
Çanak is of Turkish descent.
