= Jonathan Lardot =

Belgian football referee

- Full name: Jonathan Lardot
- Born: 31 January 1984 (age 42); Belgium

Domestic
Years	League	Role
2010-	Belgian Pro League	Referee

Jonathan Lardot (31 January 1984) is a Belgian football referee. He made his debut in the Belgian Pro League during the 2010–11 season. On 26 July 2013, he refereed the opening game of the 2013/14 season between Club Brugge and Charleroi.
