= Gilles Dewaele =

Belgian footballer (born 1996)

Personal information
- Date of birth: 13 February 1996 (age 30)
- Place of birth: Knokke, Belgium
- Height: 1.82 m (6 ft 0 in)
- Position: Right-back

Team information
- Current team: Kortrijk
- Number: 20

Youth career
- –2013: Cercle Brugge

Senior career*
Years	Team	Apps	(Gls)
2013–2017	Cercle Brugge	63	(1)
2017–2020	Westerlo	91	(5)
2020–2022	Kortrijk	48	(3)
2022–2024	Standard Liège	44	(0)
2024–	Kortrijk	23	(1)

International career
2012–2013	Belgium U17	8	(0)
2013–2014	Belgium U18	9	(1)
2014	Belgium U19	7	(0)
- * Club domestic league appearances and goals as of 19 April 2026

Gilles Dewaele (born 13 February 1996) is a Belgian professional footballer who plays as the right-back for Kortrijk. He comes from Cercle's youth team.

== Club career ==
Dewaele made his debut on 25 October 2013 at the 12th matchday of the season in the Jupiler Pro League. Dewaele substituted Tim Smolders after 76 minutes in a 1–1 draw against Gent.

On 28 June 2024, Dewaele returned to Kortrijk on a three-year contract.
