= Merveille Bokadi =

Congolese professional footballer

Personal information
- Full name: Merveille Bope Bokadi
- Date of birth: 21 May 1996 (age 30)
- Place of birth: Kinshasa, Zaire
- Height: 1.86 m (6 ft 1 in)
- Position: Defender

Senior career*
Years	Team	Apps	(Gls)
2014–2017	TP Mazembe	84	(4)
2017–2024	Standard Liège	134	(8)
2025–2026	Eupen	13	(1)

International career^{‡}
2013	DR Congo U21	1	(0)
2016–	DR Congo	29	(1)
- * Club domestic league appearances and goals as of 20 April 2026 ‡ National team caps and goals as of 30 March 2023

Merveille Bope Bokadi (born 21 May 1996) is a DR Congolese professional footballer who plays as a defender for the DR Congo national team.

== Club career ==
In September 2019 he ruptured his anterior cruciate ligament.

On 21 August 2025, Bokadi joined Eupen in the Belgian second tier for one year, after not playing in the previous season.

== International career ==
=== International goals ===
Scores and results list DR Congo's goal tally first.

No	Date	Venue	Opponent	Score	Result	Competition
1.	21 January 2016	Stade Huye, Butare, Rwanda	Angola	4–1	4–2	2016 African Nations Championship
