= 2021 Belgian Cup final =

- Event: 2020–21 Belgian Cup
Standard Liège	Genk
1	2
- 25 April 2021
- Venue: King Baudouin Stadium, Brussels
- Referee: Bram Van Driessche
- Attendance: 0 (Note: The final was played behind closed doors due to the COVID-19 pandemic in Belgium.)

The 2021 Belgian Cup final, named Croky Cup after the sponsor, was the 66th Belgian Cup final. On 13 March 2021, Standard Liège qualified for their 18th final, losing 9 and winning 8. Genk qualified one day later, reaching their sixth final, winning all but one, namely their latest appearance when they lost the 2018 Belgian Cup Final to Standard Liège. It took place on 25 April 2021 and was won by Genk.

== Route to the final ==
Standard Liège					Genk
Opponent	Result	Legs	Scorers	Round	Opponent	Result	Legs	Scorers
Seraing (II)	4–1	4–1 away	Bokadi, Jans, Klauss, Muleka	Sixth round	Tessenderlo (III)	5–0 FF	5–0 FF away
Kortrijk (I)	1–1	1–1 away (a.e.t.) (6–5 p)	Laifis	Seventh round	Sint-Truiden (I)	1–0	1–0 home	Onuachu
Club Brugge (I)	1–0	1–0 home	Muleka	Quarter-finals	Mechelen (I)	4–1	4–1 home	Thorstvedt (2), Muñoz, Bongonda
Eupen (I)	1–0	1–0 away	Amallah	Semi-finals	Anderlecht (I)	2–1	2–1 away	Onuachu, Miazga (o.g.)

== Match ==
=== Summary ===
In an empty King Baudouin Stadium, both teams started the match eagerly. Genk came close to an early goal, with a shot by Kristian Thorstvedt hitting the post and a first serious warning for Standard Liège. Standard Liège, who had been relying on their fighting spirit throughout the season, lacked sharpness and creativity in the final third of the pitch. At the back, however, they did manage to keep control of the ball and kept Genk at bay after the initial challenge by Thorstvedt. During the 1st half, Théo Bongonda and poacher Paul Onuachu were firmly in the defense's grip.

At the start of the second half, the game split open, when Hugo Siquet lost the ball, Genk immediately sent it to Junya Itō, who left Arnaud Bodart without a chance with a crossed shot. The goal gave Genk confidence and the Limburg team gradually took more and more control of the match. Although Genk was the better team, they still had to watch their backs. The Genk defense had a hard time dealing with the excellent substitute Jackson Muleka, who had the equalizer at his feet, but his shot was a miss. As the game progressed, Standard was forced to take more risks, allowing more space for Genk. Ten minutes before the end of the game, Bongonda took advantage of this to slide in the 0-2. Muleka immediately brought the excitement back with a strong header, but Genk survived the final offensive, winning their 5th Belgian Cup and being assured of European football for the coming season.

=== Details ===
25 April 2021
20:45 CEST

Standard Liège	1–2	Genk
Muleka 83'	Report	Itō 48'; Bongonda 80'

King Baudouin Stadium, Brussels
Attendance: 0
Referee: Bram Van Driessche

Standard Liège	Genk

GK	16	(Belgium) Arnaud Bodart
RB	41	(Belgium) Hugo Siquet
CB	5	(France) Moussa Sissako	(red card) 90+2'
CB	34	(Cyprus) Konstantinos Laifis
LB	24	(France) Nicolas Gavory	(yellow card) 63'
MF	19	(Morocco) Selim Amallah	(yellow card) 87'
MF	28	(Belgium) Samuel Bastien		(substituted off) 75'
MF	8	(Bosnia and Herzegovina) Gojko Cimirot		(substituted off) 66'
MF	26	(Belgium) Nicolas Raskin	(yellow card) 71'
CF	14	(Brazil) Klauss
MF	32	(Belgium) Michel-Ange Balikwisha		(substituted off) 57'
Substitutes:
MF	10	(Morocco) Mehdi Carcela	(yellow card) 81'	(substituted on) 66'
FW	17	(Democratic Republic of the Congo) Jackson Muleka	(yellow card) 65'	(substituted on) 57'
MF	22	(Belgium) Maxime Lestienne		(substituted on) 75'
GK	1	(Belgium) Jean-François Gillet
DF	6	(Belgium) Noë Dussenne
MF	15	(Israel) Eden Shamir
DF	21	(Cameroon) Collins Fai
DF	33	(Belgium) Damjan Pavlovic
Manager:
(Senegal) Mbaye Leye

GK	26	(Belgium) Maarten Vandevoordt
RB	23	(Colombia) Daniel Muñoz	(yellow card) 56'
CB	46	(Colombia) Carlos Cuesta
CB	33	(Colombia) Jhon Lucumí
LB	5	(Mexico) Gerardo Arteaga
MF	7	(Japan) Junya Itō
MF	17	(Slovakia) Patrik Hrošovský	(yellow card) 90'
MF	42	(Norway) Kristian Thorstvedt		(substituted off) 87'
MF	8	(Belgium) Bryan Heynen
CF	10	(Belgium) Théo Bongonda
CF	18	(Nigeria) Paul Onuachu
Substitutes:
DF	2	(United States) Mark McKenzie		(substituted on) 87'
FW	9	(Nigeria) Cyriel Dessers
MF	14	(Switzerland) Bastien Toma
DF	21	(Finland) Jere Uronen
MF	24	(Belgium) Luca Oyen
GK	40	(Belgium) Tobe Leysen
DF	77	(Ecuador) Ángelo Preciado
Manager:
(Netherlands) John van den Brom

Assistant referees:
Kevin Monteny
Yves De Neve
Fourth official:
Jan Boterberg

Match rules

- 90 minutes.
- 30 minutes of extra time if necessary.
- Penalty shoot-out if scores still level.
- Eight named substitutes.
- Maximum of three substitutions.
