= 2020–21 Standard Liège season =

Standard Liège
2020–21 season
- Chairman: Bruno Venanzi
- Manager: Philippe Montanier (until 26 December); Mbaye Leye (from 30 December)
- Stadium: Stade Maurice Dufrasne
- Belgian First Division A: 6th
- Belgian Cup: Runners-up
- UEFA Europa League: Group stage
- Top goalscorer: League: Selim Amallah (10); All: Selim Amallah (15)
Home colours	Away colours	Third colours
- All statistics correct as of 22 May 2021.

The 2020–21 Standard Liège season was the club's 117th season in existence and its ninth consecutive season in the top flight of Belgian football. In addition to the domestic league, Standard Liège participated in this season's edition of the Belgian Cup and participated in the UEFA Europa League. The season covered the period from 1 July 2020 to 30 June 2021.

== Players ==
=== First-team squad ===
As of 14 January 2021

Note: Flags indicate national team as defined under FIFA eligibility rules; some limited exceptions apply. Players may hold more than one non-FIFA nationality.

No.	Pos.	Nation	Player
1	GK	BEL	Jean-François Gillet
3	DF	BEL	Zinho Vanheusden
5	DF	MLI	Moussa Sissako
6	DF	BEL	Noë Dussenne
7	FW	CRO	Duje Čop
8	MF	BIH	Gojko Cimirot
9	FW	BEL	Obbi Oularé
10	MF	MAR	Mehdi Carcela
11	MF	COD	William Balikwisha
12	MF	FRA	Eddy Sylvestre
13	DF	COD	John Nekadio
14	FW	BRA	Klauss (on loan from Hoffenheim)
15	MF	ISR	Eden Shamir
16	GK	BEL	Arnaud Bodart
17	FW	COD	Jackson Muleka
18	MF	MNE	Aleksandar Boljević
19	MF	MAR	Selim Amallah

No.	Pos.	Nation	Player
20	MF	COD	Merveille Bokadi
21	DF	CMR	Collins Fai
22	MF	BEL	Maxime Lestienne
23	FW	BFA	Abdoul Tapsoba
24	DF	FRA	Nicolas Gavory
25	FW	URU	Felipe Avenatti
26	MF	BEL	Nicolas Raskin
27	DF	LUX	Laurent Jans
28	MF	BEL	Samuel Bastien
29	MF	BEL	Joachim Carcela
30	GK	BEL	Laurent Henkinet
31	FW	BEL	Mitchy Ntelo
32	MF	BEL	Michel-Ange Balikwisha
33	DF	BEL	Damjan Pavlovic
34	DF	CYP	Konstantinos Laifis
41	DF	BEL	Hugo Siquet

=== Out on loan ===
Note: Flags indicate national team as defined under FIFA eligibility rules; some limited exceptions apply. Players may hold more than one non-FIFA nationality.

No.	Pos.	Nation	Player
12	FW	ROU	Denis Drăguș (at Crotone)

== Transfers ==
=== In ===
No.	Pos	Player	Transferred from	Fee	Date	Source
15			TBD		1 July 2020	

=== Out ===
No.	Pos	Player	Transferred to	Fee	Date	Source
–	DF	(Belgium) Arthur Theate	(Belgium) Oostende	Undisclosed	13 July 2020	
–	MF	(Brazil) Carlinhos	(Brazil) Vasco da Gama	Undisclosed	7 August 2020	
7	FW	(Portugal) Orlando Sá	(Spain) Málaga	Free	13 August 2020	

== Pre-season and friendlies ==
Win Draw Loss Fixtures

4 July 2020 Friendly	Standard Liège (Belgium)	3–2	(Belgium) Kortrijk	Angleur, Belgium
16:00 CEST (UTC+2)				Stadium: Académie Robert Louis-Dreyfus

11 July 2020 Friendly	Standard Liège (Belgium)	1–1	(Belgium) OH Leuven	Angleur, Belgium
15:00 CEST (UTC+2)				Stadium: Académie Robert Louis-Dreyfus

11 July 2020 Friendly	Standard Liège (Belgium)	0–1	(Belgium) OH Leuven	Angleur, Belgium
16:30 CEST (UTC+2)				Stadium: Académie Robert Louis-Dreyfus

18 July 2020 Friendly	Standard Liège (Belgium)	4–0	(Belgium) KV Mechelen	Boncelles, Belgium
18:00 CEST (UTC+2)				Stadium: Académie Robert Louis-Dreyfus

22 July 2020 Friendly	Standard Liège (Belgium)	2–1	(France) Monaco	Seraing, Belgium
18:00 CEST (UTC+2)	Avenatti 88', 90'		Geubbels 19'	Stadium: Stade du Pairay; Attendance: 0

25 July 2020 Friendly	Standard Liège (Belgium)	1–2	(France) Nice	Liège, Belgium
18:00 CEST (UTC+2)	Avenatti 33'		Dolberg 37' (pen.); Kamara 47'	Stadium: Stade Maurice Dufrasne; Attendance: 0

1 August 2020 Friendly	Standard Liège (Belgium)	1–0	(France) Reims	Liège, Belgium
15:00 CEST (UTC+2)	Carcela 65'			Stadium: Stade Maurice Dufrasne; Attendance: 0

1 August 2020 Friendly	Standard Liège (Belgium)	3–0	(France) Reims	Seraing, Belgium
17:30 CEST (UTC+2)	Shamir 20'; Balikwisha 45'; Čop 59'			Stadium: Académie Robert Louis-Dreyfus; Attendance: 0

== Competitions ==
=== Overview ===
Competition	First match	Last match	Starting round	Final position	Record							
Competition	First match	Last match	Starting round	Final position	Pld	W	D	L	GF	GA	GD	Win %
Belgian First Division A	8 August 2020	22 May 2021	Matchday 1	6th	40	14	11	15	59	58	+1	35.00
Belgian Cup	3 February 2021	25 April 2021	Sixth round	Runners-up	5	3	1	1	8	4	+4	60.00
UEFA Europa League	17 September 2020	10 December 2020	Second qualifying round	Group stage	9	4	1	4	14	16	−2	44.44
Total					54	21	13	20	81	78	+3	38.89

Last updated: 22 May 2021
Source: Soccerway

=== Belgian First Division A ===
==== Regular season ====
Pos	Team	Pld	W	D	L	GF	GA	GD	Pts	Qualification or relegation
4	Genk (Note: Genk qualifies for at least the play-off round of the Europa League through winning the 2021 Belgian Cup.)	34	16	8	10	67	48	+19	56	Qualification for the Play-offs I
5	Oostende (Note: On 14 April 2021 news was released that both Excel Mouscron and Oostende had not received a Belgian professional football license for the coming season, a requirement to play at the top two levels of Belgian football. For Oostende, a lack of financial transparency, together with generally poor quality and incompleteness of the submitted report, was given as the main reason by the committee for not awarding a license, while Excel Mouscron was refused a license as besides insufficient transparency, the committee also questioned several cash flows and whether the club was creditworthy in general, also due to the fact that the wages for the months of February and March had not yet been paid at that point. For Excel Mouscron, it was already the sixth year running the license was (initially) refused, however, the club has appealed the decision with the Belgian Court for Sports Arbitrage (BAS) successfully on each occasion and intended to do so again. Oostende was planning to launch an appeal as well, with the BAS to rule on the matter for both clubs before the 10th of May. Both clubs were allowed to add new documents to their case, but in case they however still did not receive a license after appeal, knew they would have been forced to relegate to the 2021–22 Belgian Division 2 and start the season with a 3-point penalty. Both Excel Mouscron and Oostende were however eventually awarded a license after appeal, meaning Oostende remained at the top level, while Excel Mouscron only dropped one level.)	34	15	8	11	49	41	+8	53	Qualification for the Play-offs II
6	Standard Liège	34	13	11	10	52	41	+11	50	Qualification for the Play-offs II
7	Gent	34	14	7	13	55	42	+13	49	Qualification for the Play-offs II
8	Mechelen	34	13	9	12	54	54	0	48	Qualification for the Play-offs II

Source: Jupiler Pro League (in Dutch), Soccerway
Rules for classification: 1) Points; 2) Matches won; 3) Goal difference; 4) Goals scored; 5) Away matches won; 6) Away goal difference; 7) Away goals scored; 8) Play-off.

==== Results summary ====
Overall								Home						Away					
Pld	W	D	L	GF	GA	GD	Pts	W	D	L	GF	GA	GD	W	D	L	GF	GA	GD
34	13	11	10	52	41	+11	50	7	7	3	26	20	+6	6	4	7	26	21	+5

Last updated: 18 April 2021.
Source: Jupiler Pro League

==== Results by round ====
Round	1	2	3	4	5	6	7	8	9	10	11	12	13	14	15	16	17	18	19	20	21	22	23	24	25	26	27	28	29	30	31	32	33	34
Ground	H	A	H	A	A	H	H	A	H	A	H	A	H	A	H	A	A	H	H	H	A	A	H	A	A	H	H	A	H	A	A	H	A	H
Result	W	W	D	W	L	W	D	W	D	L	W	D	D	D	D	L	L	L	L	W	W	W	W	D	L	D	D	L	L	L	D	W	W	W
Position	6	2	3	2	3	2	4	3	4	5	3	4	5	5	6	7	8	9	11	10	8	5	4	4	4	6	6	10	10	11	11	9	6	6

Updated to match(es) played on 18 April 2021. Source: Jupiler Pro League
A = Away; H = Home; W = Win; D = Draw; L = Loss

==== Matches ====
The league fixtures were announced on 8 July 2020.

8 August 2020 1	Standard Liège	1–0	Cercle Brugge	Liège
19:00 CEST (UTC+2)	Bastien 55'; Avenatti (yellow card) 59'	Report	Hotić (yellow card) 77'	Stadium: Stade Maurice Dufrasne; Attendance: 0 Referee: Jonathan Lardot

17 August 2020 2	Waasland-Beveren	1–2	Standard Liège	Beveren
19:00 CEST (UTC+2)	Bizimana (yellow card) 27'; Schryvers 60'; Mertens (yellow card) 65'; Caufriez (yellow card) 90+4'	Report	Shamir (yellow card) 16'; Raskin (yellow card) 20'; Laifis (yellow card) 40'; Amallah 67'; Bastien 70'	Stadium: Freethiel Stadion; Attendance: 0 Referee: Frederik Geldhof

23 August 2020 3	Standard Liège	0–0	Genk	Liège
13:30 CEST (UTC+2)	Amallah (yellow card) 44' (yellow-red card) 90'; Vojvoda (yellow card) 51'; Laifis (yellow card) 74'; Fai (yellow card) 77'; Gavory (yellow card) 81'	Report	Lucumí (yellow card) 30'; Muñoz (yellow card) 76'	Stadium: Stade Maurice Dufrasne; Attendance: 0 Referee: Nicolas Laforge

30 August 2020 4	Beerschot	0–3	Standard Liège	Antwerp
16:00 CEST (UTC+2)	Sanusi (yellow card) 26'; Vorogovskiy (yellow card) 80'; Holzhauser (yellow card) 82'	Report	Avenatti 32'; Fai (yellow card) 73'; Lestienne 76'; Oularé 83'	Stadium: Olympisch Stadion; Attendance: 0 Referee: Nathan Verboomen

12 September 2020 5	OH Leuven	1–0	Standard Liège	Leuven
18:30 CEST (UTC+2)	Kotysch (yellow card) 32'; Sowah 77'; Raemaekers (yellow card) 84'	Report	Oularé (yellow card) 13'; Gavory (yellow card) 24' (yellow-red card) 60'; Raskin (yellow card) 51'	Stadium: Den Dreef; Attendance: 2,000; Referee: Jonathan Lardot

20 September 2020 6	Standard Liège	2–1	Kortrijk	Liège
16:00 CEST (UTC+2)	Amallah 31' (pen.); Oularé 35'	Report	Mboyo 36'; D'haene (yellow card) 38'; Jonckheere (yellow card) 84'; Rougeaux (yellow card) 90'	Stadium: Stade Maurice Dufrasne; Attendance: 0 Referee: Jan Boterberg

27 September 2020 7	Standard Liège	2–2	Zulte Waregem	Liège
13:30 CEST (UTC+2)	Oularé (yellow card) 41'; Balikwisha 47'; Fai (yellow card) 60'; Muleka 81'	Report	Dompé 10'; Vossen 49', (yellow card) 81'; Marcq (yellow card) 71'; De Bock (yellow card) 77'	Stadium: Stade Maurice Dufrasne; Attendance: 6,578; Referee: Erik Lambrechts

4 October 2020 8	Charleroi	1–2	Standard Liège	Charleroi
18:15 CEST (UTC+2)	Nicholson (yellow card) 46'; Fall 87'; Ilaimaharitra (yellow card) 89'	Report	Tapsoba (yellow card) 32'; Amallah (yellow card) 44'; Vanheusden (yellow card) 72'; Balikwisha 79'; Raskin 84'	Stadium: Stade du Pays de Charleroi; Attendance: 5,261; Referee: Lawrence Visser

17 October 2020 9	Standard Liège	1–1	Club Brugge	Liège
20:45 CEST (UTC+2)	Lestienne (yellow card) 20'; Gavory 90+3' (pen.); Raskin (yellow card) 90+7'	Report	Mata (yellow card) 33'; Diatta 40'; Rits (yellow card) 71'; Badji (yellow card) 90+7'	Stadium: Stade Maurice Dufrasne; Attendance: 10,000; Referee: Nicolas Laforge

25 October 2020 10	Sint-Truiden	2–0	Standard Liège	Sint-Truiden
18:15 CET (UTC+1)	Nazon 37'; De Ridder 73', (yellow card) 80'	Report	Amallah (yellow card) 67'	Stadium: Stayen; Attendance: 0 Referee: Kevin Van Damme

1 November 2020 11	Standard Liège	1–0	Oostende	Liège
18:15 CET (UTC+1)	Dussenne 86'	Report		Stadium: Stade Maurice Dufrasne; Attendance: 0 Referee: Lawrence Visser

8 November 2020 12	Antwerp	1–1	Standard Liège	Antwerp
13:30 CET (UTC+1)	Refaelov 10'	Report	Lestienne 68'; Tapsoba (yellow card) 74'; Raskin (yellow card) 74'; Pavlovic (yellow card) 90+3'	Stadium: Bosuilstadion; Attendance: 0 Referee: Bram Van Driessche

21 November 2020 13	Standard Liège	2–2	Eupen	Liège
16:15 CET (UTC+1)	Bokadi 35'; Shamir (yellow card) 41', (red card) 45'; Bodart 90+6'	Report	Prevljak 36'; Peeters 57'	Stadium: Stade Maurice Dufrasne; Attendance: 0 Referee: Bert Put

29 November 2020 14	Anderlecht	0–0	Standard Liège	Anderlecht
18:15 CET (UTC+1)	Nmecha (yellow card) 80'; Cullen (yellow card) 82'	Report	Cimirot (yellow card) 15'; Dussenne (yellow card) 78'	Stadium: Constant Vanden Stock Stadium; Attendance: 0 Referee: Jonathan Lardot

6 December 2020 15	Standard Liège	2–2	KV Mechelen	Liège
18:15 CET (UTC+1)	Laifis 45'; Fai (yellow card) 73'; Balikwisha 78'; Dussenne (yellow card) 90'	Report	Van Damme 63' (pen.); Walsh 88'; Mrabti (yellow card) 90+6'	Stadium: Stade Maurice Dufrasne; Attendance: 0 Referee: Erik Lambrechts

13 December 2020 16	Gent	2–1	Standard Liège	Ghent
18:15 CET (UTC+1)	Fortuna 27'; Yaremchuk 85'	Report	Ngadeu-Ngadjui 2' (o.g.); Cimirot (yellow card) 50'	Stadium: Ghelamco Arena; Attendance: 0 Referee: Lawrence Visser

16 December 2020 17	Kortrijk	2–1	Standard Liège	Kortrijk
21:00 CET (UTC+1)	Dewaele 2'; Makarenko 39'; Derijck (yellow card) 43'; Ocansey (yellow card) 55'; Lepoint (yellow card) 90+9'	Report	Lestienne 76'; Jans (yellow card) 79'	Stadium: Guldensporen Stadion; Attendance: 0 Referee: Jasper Vergoote

20 December 2020 18	Standard Liège	0–1	Excel Mouscron	Liège
18:15 CET (UTC+1)	Jans (yellow card) 9'; Bokadi (yellow card) 72'; Amallah (yellow card) 77'; Carcela (yellow card) 78'	Report	Xadas 30'; Hočko (yellow card) 34'	Stadium: Stade Maurice Dufrasne; Attendance: 0 Referee: Nicolas Laforge

26 December 2020 19	Standard Liège	1–2	Sint-Truiden	Liège
20:45 CET (UTC+1)	Amallah (yellow card) 39'; Muleka 71'; Balikwisha (yellow card) 75'	Report	Nazon 5'; Suzuki 16'; Asamoah (yellow card) 18'; Caufriez (red card) 53'; Konaté (yellow card) 71'	Stadium: Stade Maurice Dufrasne; Attendance: 0 Referee: Lothar D'hondt

11 January 2021 30	Standard Liège	3–1	Waasland-Beveren	Liège
20:45 CET (UTC+1)	Bastien (yellow card) 25'; Amallah 31', 66'; Muleka (yellow card) 33'; Siquet (yellow card) 68'; Bokadi 74'	Report	Vukotić (yellow card) 57'; Wuytens 84'	Stadium: Stade Maurice Dufrasne; Attendance: 0 Referee: Christof Dierick

17 January 2021 20	Cercle Brugge	0–1	Standard Liège	Bruges
16:00 CET (UTC+1)	Ugbo (yellow card) 85'	Report	Lestienne 11'; Tapsoba (yellow card) 88'	Stadium: Jan Breydel Stadium; Attendance: 0 Referee: Bert Put

20 January 2021 21	KV Mechelen	0–4	Standard Liège	Mechelen
18:45 CET (UTC+1)	De Camargo (yellow card) 77'	Report	Dussenne 22'; Amallah 49'; Pavlovic (yellow card) 51'; Bastien 54'; Balikwisha 57'	Stadium: Achter de Kazerne; Attendance: 0 Referee: Kevin Van Damme

24 January 2021 22	Standard Liège	3–2	Charleroi	Liège
18:15 CET (UTC+1)	Klauss 13'; Balikwisha 38'; Carcela (yellow card) 73'; Muleka 80'	Report	Fall 30', 65'; Benchaib (yellow card) 50'; Penneteau (yellow card) 90+2', (red card) 90+5'	Stadium: Stade Maurice Dufrasne; Attendance: 0 Referee: Jonathan Lardot

28 January 2021 23	Oostende	2–2	Standard Liège	Ostend
21:00 CET (UTC+1)	Sakala 8', 64'; Hubert (yellow card) 88'; Hjulsager (yellow card) 89'	Report	Balikwisha 47'; Bokadi 90+4'	Stadium: Diaz Arena; Attendance: 0 Referee: Wesli De Cremer

31 January 2021 24	Club Brugge	3–1	Standard Liège	Bruges
13:30 CET (UTC+1)	Vanaken 19'; Dost 41'; Lang 49'; Kossounou (yellow card) 73'	Report	Bokadi 3'; Bastien (yellow card) 62'; Carcela (yellow card) 88'; Dussenne (yellow card) 88'; Pavlovic (yellow card) 90+2'	Stadium: Jan Breydel Stadium; Attendance: 0 Referee: Nicolas Laforge

6 February 2021 25	Standard Liège	1–1	OH Leuven	Liège
20:45 CET (UTC+1)	Laifis (yellow card) 38'; Dussenne (yellow card) 82' (yellow-red card) 87'; Klauss 84'	Report	Henry 60'; Raemaekers (yellow card) 90+3'	Stadium: Stade Maurice Dufrasne; Attendance: 0 Referee: Lawrence Visser

14 February 2021 26	Standard Liège	1–1	Antwerp	Liège
13:30 CET (UTC+1)	Carcela 8' (pen.); Lestienne (yellow card) 80'	Report	De Pauw 28'; Hongla (yellow card) 45+5'; Boya (yellow card) 56'; Lamkel Zé (yellow card) 79'; Le Marchand (yellow card) 90'	Stadium: Stade Maurice Dufrasne; Attendance: 0 Referee: Bram Van Driessche

21 February 2021 27	Zulte Waregem	3–2	Standard Liège	Waregem
16:00 CET (UTC+1)	Dompé 15'; Bruno 56', 59'	Report	Klauss 11'; Bastien 53'; Tapsoba (yellow card) 90+1'	Stadium: Regenboogstadion; Attendance: 0 Referee: Wim Smet

28 February 2021 28	Standard Liège	1–3	Anderlecht	Liège
13:30 CET (UTC+1)	Amallah (yellow card) 42', (goal) 83'; Gavory (yellow card) 63'; Bokadi (yellow card) 70'	Report	Lawrence (yellow card) 2', (goal) 71'; Amuzu 23'; Mukairu (yellow card) 62'; Dauda 90+4'	Stadium: Stade Maurice Dufrasne; Attendance: 0 Referee: Erik Lambrechts

7 March 2021 29	Excel Mouscron	1–0	Standard Liège	Mouscron
13:30 CET (UTC+1)	Siquet 37' (o.g.); Olinga (yellow card) 73'; Bakić (yellow card) 90+1'	Report	Laifis (yellow card) 90+5'	Stadium: Stade Le Canonnier; Attendance: 0 Referee: Wesli De Cremer

19 March 2021 31	Genk	2–2	Standard Liège	Genk
20:45 CET (UTC+1)	Lucumí (yellow card) 36'; Ito (yellow card) 44', (goal) 59', 72'	Report	Klauss 54'; Pavlovic (yellow card) 62'; Siquet (yellow card) 69'; Muleka 81', (yellow card) 85'; Laifis (yellow card) 90+1'	Stadium: Luminus Arena; Attendance: 0 Referee: Erik Lambrechts

4 April 2021 32	Standard Liège	2–1	Gent	Liège
18:15 CEST (UTC+2)	Sissako (yellow card) 36'; Muleka 66'; Balikwisha 77'; Fai (yellow card) 81'	Report	Yaremchuk (penalty missed) 36'; Castro-Montes (penalty missed) 43', 43', (yellow card) 45+1'; Ngadeu-Ngadjui (yellow card) 60'; Kums (yellow card) 76'; Fortuna (yellow card) 77'	Stadium: Stade Maurice Dufrasne; Attendance: 0 Referee: Nicolas Laforge

9 April 2021 33	Eupen	0–4	Standard Liège	Eupen
20:45 CEST (UTC+2)	Peeters (yellow card) 90+2'	Report	Amallah 43', 68'; Muleka 71'; Lestienne 85'	Stadium: Kehrwegstadion; Attendance: 0 Referee: Christof Dierick

18 April 2021 34	Standard Liège	3–0	Beerschot	Liège
18:00 CEST (UTC+2)	Muleka (yellow card) 6', (goal) 86'; Klauss 44'; Amallah 60' (pen.)	Report	Pietermaat (yellow card) 26'; Dom (yellow card) 90+4'	Stadium: Stade Maurice Dufrasne; Attendance: 0 Referee: Erik Lambrechts

==== Play-Off II ====
Pos	Team	Pld	W	D	L	GF	GA	GD	Pts	Qualification or relegation	GNT	MEC	OOS	STA
1	Gent	6	4	1	1	13	6	+7	38	Qualification for the Europa Conference League second qualifying round	—	2–2	2–1	2–0
2	Mechelen	6	3	2	1	15	11	+4	35		1–2	—	5–3	3–1
3	Oostende	6	2	1	3	15	16	−1	34		0–4	2–2	—	6–2
4	Standard Liège	6	1	0	5	7	17	−10	28		2–1	1–2	1–3	—

Source: Jupiler Pro League (in Dutch), Soccerway
Legend: Blue = home team win; Yellow = draw; Red = away team win.
Rules for classification: 1) Points; 2) Points without (possible) half points added due to rounding; 3) Regular season finishing position.

==== Results summary ====
Overall								Home						Away					
Pld	W	D	L	GF	GA	GD	Pts	W	D	L	GF	GA	GD	W	D	L	GF	GA	GD
6	1	0	5	7	17	−10	3	1	0	2	4	6	−2	0	0	3	3	11	−8

Last updated: 22 May 2021.
Source: Jupiler Pro League

==== Results by round ====
Round	1	2	3	4	5	6
Ground	A	H	H	A	A	H
Result	L	W	L	L	L	L
Position	3	2	4	4	4	4

Updated to match(es) played on 22 May 2021. Source: Jupiler Pro League
A = Away; H = Home; W = Win; D = Draw; L = Loss

==== Matches ====
1 May 2021 1	Oostende	6–2	Standard Liège	Ostend
20:45 CEST (UTC+2)	Kvasina 30'; Bätzner 39'; Theate 44', (yellow card) 62'; Capon (yellow card) 62'; Hjulsager 64'; Ndicka 90+3'; Boonen 90+6'	Report	Carcela (yellow card) 27' (yellow-red card) 50', (goal) 45+2'; Muleka 45'; Balikwisha (yellow card) 78'; Delferrière (yellow card) 89'	Stadium: Diaz Arena; Attendance: 0 Referee: Lothar D'hondt

8 May 2021 2	Standard Liège	2–1	Gent	Liège
18:30 CEST (UTC+2)	Amallah 61', (yellow card) 70'; Gavory (yellow card) 72'; Balikwisha 77'; Klauss (yellow card) 86'; Tapsoba (yellow card) 90+4'	Report	Bezus 8'; Odjidja-Ofoe (yellow card) 45+1', (penalty missed) 79'; Dorsch (yellow card) 89'	Stadium: Stade Maurice Dufrasne; Attendance: 0 Referee: Jan Boterberg

13 May 2021 3	Standard Liège	1–2	KV Mechelen	Liège
16:00 CEST (UTC+2)	Amallah (yellow card) 36'; Raskin 68'	Report	Gavory 14' (o.g.); Storm 54'; Peyre (red card) 69'; Walsh (yellow card) 73'; Bijker (yellow card) 84'	Stadium: Stade Maurice Dufrasne; Attendance: 0 Referee: Kevin Van Damme

16 May 2021 4	KV Mechelen	3–1	Standard Liège	Mechelen
16:00 CEST (UTC+2)	Schoofs 13', 71'; Shved 57'; Vanlerberghe (yellow card) 70'	Report	Delferrière (yellow card) 5'; Sissako (yellow card) 35'; Bastien (yellow card) 82'; Muleka 89'	Stadium: Achter de Kazerne; Attendance: 0 Referee: Bert Put

19 May 2021 5	Gent	2–0	Standard Liège	Ghent
21:00 CEST (UTC+2)	Malede 7'; Ngadeu-Ngadjui (yellow card) 40'; Castro-Montes (yellow card) 66'; Yaremchuk 90+4'	Report	Lestienne (yellow card) 49'; Balikwisha (yellow card) 70'	Stadium: Ghelamco Arena; Attendance: 0 Referee: Alexandre Boucaut

22 May 2021 6	Standard Liège	1–3	Oostende	Liège
20:00 CEST (UTC+2)	Balikwisha 13'; Klauss (yellow card) 63'; Laifis (yellow card) 90+1'	Report	Vandendriessche 6', 61'; Boonen 50'; Thiam (yellow card) 90'; Ndicka (yellow card) 90+3'	Stadium: Stade Maurice Dufrasne; Attendance: 0 Referee: Wim Smet

=== Belgian Cup ===
3 February 2021 Sixth round	Seraing	1–4	Standard Liège	Seraing
19:00 CET (UTC+1)	Mouhli 85' (pen.)	Report	Bokadi 3'; Jans 36'; Klauss 67'; Muleka 90+1'	Stadium: Stade du Pairay; Attendance: 0

9 February 2021 Seventh round	Kortrijk	1–1 (a.e.t.) (5–6 p)	Standard Liège	Kortrijk
20:00 CET (UTC+1)	Selemani 90+2'	Report	Laifis 36'; Tapsoba (yellow card) 82'; Siquet (yellow card) 98'	Stadium: Guldensporen Stadion; Attendance: 0 Referee: Lothar D'hondt
	Penalties
	Chevalier (penalty scored); Makarenko (penalty scored); Stojanović (penalty scored); Derijck (penalty missed); Selemani (penalty scored); Guèye (penalty scored); Sainsbury (penalty missed)		(penalty scored) Bastien; (penalty scored) Klauss; (penalty scored) Dussenne; (penalty missed) Muleka; (penalty scored) Raskin; (penalty scored) Laifis; (penalty scored) Siquet

4 March 2021 Quarter-finals	Standard Liège	1–0	Club Brugge	Liège
20:45 CET (UTC+1)	Muleka (yellow card) 39', (goal) 49'; Bodart (yellow card) 74'; Siquet (yellow card) 78'; Amallah (yellow card) 79'; Laifis (yellow card) 90+4'	Report	Mechele (yellow card) 45'; Kossounou (red card) 81'; Balanta (yellow card) 88'	Stadium: Stade Maurice Dufrasne; Attendance: 0 Referee: Nathan Verboomen

13 March 2021 Semi-finals	Eupen	0–1	Standard Liège	Eupen
20:45 CET (UTC+1)	Peeters (yellow card) 8'; Heris (yellow card) 73'; Defourny (yellow card) 90'	Report	Muleka (yellow card) 16'; Raskin (yellow card) 26'; Amallah 66'; Laifis (yellow card) 90+2'	Stadium: Kehrwegstadion; Attendance: 0 Referee: Lawrence Visser

25 April 2021 Final	Standard Liège	1–2	Genk	Brussels
20:45 CEST (UTC+2)	Gavory (yellow card) 63'; Muleka (yellow card) 65', (goal) 83'; Raskin (yellow card) 71'; Carcela (yellow card) 81'; Amallah (yellow card) 87'; Sissako (red card) 90+2'	Report	Ito 48'; Muñoz (yellow card) 56'; Bongonda 80'; Hrošovský (yellow card) 90'	Stadium: King Baudouin Stadium; Attendance: 0 Referee: Bram Van Driessche

=== UEFA Europa League ===
==== Qualifying rounds ====
17 September 2020 Second qualifying round	Standard Liège (Belgium)	2–0	(Wales) Bala Town	Liège, Belgium
20:00 CEST (UTC+2)	Avenatti 19' (pen.); Laifis (yellow card) 27'; Amallah 34'	Report	Smith (yellow card) 52'; Kay (yellow card) 64'	Stadium: Stade Maurice Dufrasne; Attendance: 0 Referee: Trustin Farrugia Cann (Malta)

24 September 2020 Third qualifying round	Standard Liège (Belgium)	2–1 (a.e.t.)	(Serbia) Vojvodina	Liège, Belgium
20:00 CEST (UTC+2)	Avenatti (yellow card) 25', (goal) 47' (pen.); Gavory (yellow card) 53'; Amallah (yellow card) 59', (goal) 91'	Report	Saničanin (yellow card) 33'; Čović (yellow card) 59'; Đuričin (yellow card) 64'; Đorđević (yellow card) 68'; Bojić 75', (yellow card) 90'; Maksimović (yellow card) 114'	Stadium: Stade Maurice Dufrasne; Attendance: 0 Referee: Harald Lechner (Austria)

1 October 2020 Play-off round	Standard Liège (Belgium)	3–1	(Hungary) Fehérvár	Liège, Belgium
20:00 CEST (UTC+2)	Muleka (yellow card) 22'; Laifis (yellow card) 31'; Gavory 51'; Amallah 77' (pen.), 85' (pen.)	Report	Nikolic 10'; Hangya (yellow card) 70'; Fiola (yellow card) 77'; Stopira (yellow card) 85'; Négo (yellow card) 90+3'	Stadium: Stade Maurice Dufrasne; Attendance: 0 Referee: Willie Collum (Scotland)

==== Group stage ====
The group stage draw was held on 2 October 2020.

Pos	Team	Pld	W	D	L	GF	GA	GD	Pts	Qualification	RAN	BEN	STL	LCH
1	(Scotland) Rangers	6	4	2	0	13	7	+6	14	Advance to knockout phase	—	2–2	3–2	1–0
2	(Portugal) Benfica	6	3	3	0	18	9	+9	12	Advance to knockout phase	3–3	—	3–0	4–0
3	(Belgium) Standard Liège	6	1	1	4	7	14	−7	4		0–2	2–2	—	2–1
4	(Poland) Lech Poznań	6	1	0	5	6	14	−8	3		0–2	2–4	3–1	—

Source: UEFA
Rules for classification: Group stage tiebreakers

22 October 2020 1	Standard Liège (Belgium)	0–2	(Scotland) Rangers	Liège, Belgium
18:55 CEST (UTC+2)	Dussenne (yellow card) 18'; Bodart (yellow card) 45+5'; Bastien (yellow card) 67'; Bokadi (yellow card) 82'	Report	Tavernier 19' (pen.); Hagi (yellow card) 26'; Bassey (yellow card) 66'; Roofe 90+2'	Stadium: Stade Maurice Dufrasne; Attendance: 3,139; Referee: Jakob Kehlet (Denmark)

29 October 2020 2	Benfica (Portugal)	3–0	(Belgium) Standard Liège	Lisbon, Portugal
21:00 CET (UTC+1)	Gonçalves (yellow card) 43'; Pizzi 49' (pen.), 76'; Waldschmidt 66' (pen.)	Report	Bodart (yellow card) 48'; Fai (yellow card) 65'	Stadium: Estádio da Luz; Attendance: 4,750; Referee: François Letexier (France)

5 November 2020 3	Lech Poznań (Poland)	3–1	(Belgium) Standard Liège	Poznań, Poland
18:55 CET (UTC+1)	Ramírez (yellow card) 3'; Skóraś 14'; Ishak 22', 48'; Muhar (yellow card) 88'	Report	Gavory (yellow card) 28'; Lestienne 29'; Bastien (yellow card) 53'; Dussenne (yellow card) 64'	Stadium: Stadion Miejski; Attendance: 0 Referee: Manuel Schüttengruber (Austria)

26 November 2020 4	Standard Liège (Belgium)	2–1	(Poland) Lech Poznań	Liège, Belgium
21:00 CET (UTC+1)	Oularé (yellow card) 26' (yellow-red card) 45+3'; Balikwisha (yellow card) 37'; Raskin (yellow card) 45+3'; Tapsoba 63'; Boljević (yellow card) 72'; Laifis 90+4'	Report	Crnomarković (yellow card) 20' (yellow-red card) 75'; Butko (yellow card) 43'; Ishak 61'; Kravets (yellow card) 86'	Stadium: Stade Maurice Dufrasne; Attendance: 0 Referee: Petr Ardeleánu (Czech Republic)

3 December 2020 5	Rangers (Scotland)	3–2	(Belgium) Standard Liège	Glasgow, Scotland
21:00 CET (UTC+1)	Goldson 39'; Tavernier 45+1' (pen.), (yellow card) 72'; Arfield 63'; Roofe (yellow card) 85'	Report	Lestienne 6'; Čop 41'; Dussenne (yellow card) 71'; Fai (yellow card) 90+2'	Stadium: Ibrox Stadium; Attendance: 0 Referee: Bojan Pandžić (Sweden)

10 December 2020 6	Standard Liège (Belgium)	2–2	(Portugal) Benfica	Liège, Belgium
18:55 CET (UTC+1)	Raskin 12'; Tapsoba 60'; Cimirot (yellow card) 65'	Report	Everton 16'; Ferreira (yellow card) 53'; Pizzi 67' (pen.); Cervi (yellow card) 90+3'	Stadium: Stade Maurice Dufrasne; Attendance: 0 Referee: Aleksei Kulbakov (Belarus)

== Statistics ==
=== Squad appearances and goals ===
Last updated on 25 April 2021

No.	Pos	Nat	Player	Total		Belgian Division		Belgian Cup		UEFA Europa League	
No.	Pos	Nat	Player	Apps	Goals	Apps	Goals	Apps	Goals	Apps	Goals
Goalkeepers
1	GK	(Belgium) BEL	Jean-François Gillet	3	0	2+1	0	0	0	0	0
16	GK	(Belgium) BEL	Arnaud Bodart	50	1	37	1	4	0	9	0
30	GK	(Belgium) BEL	Laurent Henkinet	2	0	1	0	1	0	0	0
33	GK	(Belgium) BEL	Timothy Galje	0	0	0	0	0	0	0	0
Defenders
3	DF	(Belgium) BEL	Zinho Vanheusden	17	0	9+3	0	0	0	5	0
5	DF	(Mali) MLI	Moussa Sissako	12	0	7+1	0	4	0	0	0
6	DF	(Belgium) BEL	Noë Dussenne	32	2	19+4	2	1+1	0	5+2	0
13	DF	(Democratic Republic of the Congo) COD	John Nekadio	0	0	0	0	0	0	0	0
21	DF	(Cameroon) CMR	Collins Fai	28	0	16+3	0	0+1	0	7+1	0
24	DF	(France) FRA	Nicolas Gavory	48	2	36+1	1	1+1	0	8+1	1
27	DF	(Luxembourg) LUX	Laurent Jans	20	1	6+7	0	2	1	3+2	0
33	DF	(Belgium) BEL	Damjan Pavlovic	13	0	3+6	0	2+2	0	0	0
34	DF	(Cyprus) CYP	Konstantinos Laifis	43	3	27+4	1	5	1	6+1	1
37	DF	(Mali) MLI	Hady Sangar	0	0	0	0	0	0	0	0
38	DF	(Belgium) BEL	Alexandro Calut	3	0	2+1	0	0	0	0	0
41	DF	(Belgium) BEL	Hugo Siquet	26	0	18+2	0	4+1	0	0+1	0
42	DF	(Belgium) BEL	Allan Delferrière	5	0	4+1	0	0	0	0	0
43	DF	(Belgium) BEL	Nathan Ngoy	1	0	1	0	0	0	0	0
Midfielders
8	MF	(Bosnia and Herzegovina) BIH	Gojko Cimirot	38	0	21+4	0	4+1	0	8	0
10	MF	(Morocco) MAR	Mehdi Carcela	36	2	12+14	2	2+2	0	4+2	0
11	MF	(Belgium) BEL	William Balikwisha	3	0	0+3	0	0	0	0	0
12	MF	(France) FRA	Eddy Sylvestre	1	0	1	0	0	0	0	0
15	MF	(Israel) ISR	Eden Shamir	23	0	7+9	0	1+1	0	3+2	0
19	MF	(Morocco) MAR	Selim Amallah	36	15	24+3	10	3	1	6	4
20	MF	(Democratic Republic of the Congo) COD	Merveille Bokadi	44	5	27+4	4	4	1	8+1	0
22	MF	(Belgium) BEL	Maxime Lestienne	40	7	24+9	5	0+3	0	4	2
26	MF	(Belgium) BEL	Nicolas Raskin	43	3	29+3	2	4+1	0	5+1	1
28	MF	(Belgium) BEL	Samuel Bastien	40	4	27+2	4	2+3	0	5+1	0
29	MF	(Belgium) BEL	Joachim Carcela	4	0	0+1	0	0	0	0+3	0
Forwards
7	FW	(Croatia) CRO	Duje Čop	13	1	5+5	0	0	0	1+2	1
9	FW	(Belgium) BEL	Obbi Oularé	18	2	5+7	2	0	0	2+4	0
14	FW	(Brazil) BRA	Klauss	24	6	16+3	5	5	1	0	0
17	FW	(Democratic Republic of the Congo) COD	Jackson Muleka	33	12	14+9	9	2+3	3	2+3	0
23	FW	(Burkina Faso) BFA	Abdoul Tapsoba	29	2	5+18	0	2+1	0	2+1	2
32	FW	(Belgium) BEL	Michel-Ange Balikwisha	40	9	24+8	9	2	0	4+2	0
Players who have made an appearance this season but have left the club
27	DF	(Kosovo) KOS	Mërgim Vojvoda	3	0	3	0	0	0	0	0
18	MF	(Montenegro) MNE	Aleksandar Boljević	9	0	3+3	0	0	0	0+3	0
12	FW	(Romania) ROU	Denis Drăguș	0	0	0	0	0	0	0	0
25	FW	(Uruguay) URU	Felipe Avenatti	16	3	5+5	1	0	0	2+4	2

=== Goalscorers ===
As of 20 January 2021

Rank	No.	Pos	Nat	Name	Pro League	Belgian Cup	Europa League	Total
1	19	MF	(Morocco)	Selim Amallah	5	0	4	9
2	22	MF	(Belgium)	Maxime Lestienne	4	0	2	6
3	32	MF	(Belgium)	Michel-Ange Balikwisha	4	0	0	4
4	25	FW	(Uruguay)	Felipe Avenatti	1	0	2	3
4	28	MF	(Belgium)	Samuel Bastien	3	0	0	3
6	6	DF	(Belgium)	Noë Dussenne	2	0	0	2
6	9	FW	(Belgium)	Obbi Oularé	2	0	0	2
6	17	FW	(Democratic Republic of the Congo)	Jackson Muleka	2	0	0	2
6	20	MF	(Democratic Republic of the Congo)	Merveille Bokadi	2	0	0	2
6	23	FW	(Burkina Faso)	Abdoul Tapsoba	0	0	2	2
6	24	DF	(France)	Nicolas Gavory	1	0	1	2
6	26	MF	(Belgium)	Nicolas Raskin	1	0	1	2
6	34	DF	(Cyprus)	Konstantinos Laifis	1	0	1	2
14	7	FW	(Croatia)	Duje Čop	0	0	1	1
14	16	GK	(Belgium)	Arnaud Bodart	1	0	0	1
Own goal					1	0	0	1
Totals					30	0	14	44
