= 2018–19 Standard Liège season =

Standard Liège
2018–19 season
- Chairman: Bruno Venanzi
- Manager: Michel Preud'homme
- Stadium: Stade Maurice Dufrasne
- Belgian First Division A: 3rd
- Belgian Super Cup: Runners-up
- Belgian Cup: Sixth round
- UEFA Champions League: Third qualifying round
- UEFA Europa League: Group stage
- Top goalscorer: League: Renaud Emond (13); All: Renaud Emond (16)
Home colours	Away colours	Third colours

During the 2018–19 Belgian football season, Standard Liège competed in the Belgian Pro League.

== Players ==
=== Current squad ===
As of 27 May 2019

Note: Flags indicate national team as defined under FIFA eligibility rules; some limited exceptions apply. Players may hold more than one non-FIFA nationality.

No.	Pos.	Nation	Player
1	GK	BEL	Jean-François Gillet
2	DF	HAI	Réginal Goreux
3	DF	BEL	Zinho Vanheusden (on loan from Inter Milan)
6	DF	SRB	Miloš Kosanović
8	MF	BIH	Gojko Cimirot
9	FW	BEL	Renaud Emond
10	MF	MAR	Mehdi Carcela
11	MF	CRO	Alen Halilović (on loan from Milan)
13	GK	MEX	Guillermo Ochoa
15	DF	BEL	Sébastien Pocognoli (captain)
16	GK	BEL	Arnaud Bodart
17	FW	BEL	Obbi Oulare (on loan from Watford)
18	MF	ROU	Răzvan Marin
19	MF	MLI	Moussa Djenepo

No.	Pos.	Nation	Player
20	MF	COD	Merveille Bokadi
21	DF	CMR	Collins Fai
22	MF	BEL	Maxime Lestienne
23	DF	BEL	Senna Miangue (on loan from Cagliari)
27	DF	KOS	Mërgim Vojvoda
28	MF	BEL	Samuel Bastien
29	DF	BEL	Luis Pedro Cavanda
30	MF	ALB	Lindon Selahi
31	MF	COD	William Balikwisha
34	DF	CYP	Konstantinos Laifis
37	MF	BEL	Nicolas Raskin
40	MF	COD	Paul-José M'Poku (vice-captain)
70	FW	POR	Orlando Sá

=== Out on loan ===
Note: Flags indicate national team as defined under FIFA eligibility rules; some limited exceptions apply. Players may hold more than one non-FIFA nationality.

No.	Pos.	Nation	Player
4	DF	BEL	Dimitri Lavalée (at Maastricht until 30 June 2019)
5	MF	NGR	Uche Agbo (at Rayo Vallecano until 30 June 2019)
7	FW	CRO	Duje Čop (at Valladolid until 30 June 2019)
11	FW	BRA	Carlinhos (at Guarani until 30 June 2019)

No.	Pos.	Nation	Player
14	MF	BEL	Jérôme Deom (at Maastricht until 30 June 2019)
24	MF	UKR	Valeriy Luchkevych (at Oleksandriya until 30 June 2019)
26	DF	COD	Christian Luyindama (at Galatasaray until 30 June 2019)

== Competitions ==
=== Belgian First Division A ===
==== League table ====
Regular season

Pos	Team	Pld	W	D	L	GF	GA	GD	Pts	Qualification or relegation
1	Genk	30	18	9	3	63	31	+32	63	Qualification for the championship play-offs
2	Club Brugge	30	16	8	6	64	32	+32	56	Qualification for the championship play-offs
3	Standard Liège	30	15	8	7	49	35	+14	53	Qualification for the championship play-offs
4	Anderlecht	30	15	6	9	49	34	+15	51	Qualification for the championship play-offs
5	Gent	30	15	5	10	53	45	+8	50	Qualification for the championship play-offs

Source: Belgian First Division A (in Dutch), Soccerway
Rules for classification: 1) Points; 2) Matches won; 3) Goal difference; 4) Goals scored; 5) Away goals scored; 6) Away matches won; 7) Play-off.

Championship play-offs

Pos	Team	Pld	W	D	L	GF	GA	GD	Pts	Qualification	GNK	CLU	STA	ANT	GNT	AND
1	Genk (C)	10	6	2	2	19	8	+11	52	Qualification for the Champions League group stage	—	3–1	0–0	4–0	2–1	3–0
2	Club Brugge	10	7	1	2	19	11	+8	50	Qualification for the Champions League third qualifying round	3–2	—	4–0	3–2	3–0	1–0
3	Standard Liège	10	4	1	5	17	16	+1	40	Qualification for the Europa League group stage	1–3	2–0	—	3–1	2–3	5–0 FF (Note: Match was abandoned near the end of the first half as Anderlecht supporters had been throwing flares and smoke bombs on the pitch. At that time Standard was leading 2–0. A few weeks later Anderlecht was fined 5.000 Euro and forced to play one match behind closed doors, with the match result set to a 5–0 win for Standard.)
4	Antwerp (O)	10	4	2	4	12	16	−4	39	Qualification for the Europa League play-off Final	1–0	0–0	2–1	—	1–2	1–1
5	Gent	10	3	1	6	10	15	−5	35	Qualification for the Europa League second qualifying round	0–1	0–1	1–2	1–2	—	2–1
6	Anderlecht	10	1	3	6	8	19	−11	32		1–1	2–3	2–1	1–2	0–0	—

Source: Sport.be
Rules for classification: 1) Points; 2) Points without (possible) half points added due to rounding; 3) Position obtained during the Regular season
(C) Champions; (O) Play-off winners

=== Belgian Cup ===
26 September 2018 Sixth round	Standard Liège	1–2	Knokke	Liège
20:30 CEST	Sá 58'	Report	Luyindama 47' (o.g.); Dhondt 73'	Stadium: Stade Maurice Dufrasne

=== Belgian Super Cup ===
22 July 2018	Club Brugge	2–1	Standard Liège	Jan Breydelstadion, Bruges
20:00 CEST	Vanaken 39'; Wesley 43'		Edmilson 49'	Attendance: 16,000; Referee: Bart Vertenten

=== UEFA Europa League ===
==== Group stage ====
Pos	Team	Pld	W	D	L	GF	GA	GD	Pts	Qualification	SEV	KRA	STL	AKH
1	(Spain) Sevilla	6	4	0	2	18	6	+12	12 (Note: Head-to-head goal difference: Sevilla +2, Krasnodar –2.)	Advance to knockout phase	—	3–0	5–1	6–0
2	(Russia) Krasnodar	6	4	0	2	8	8	0	12	Advance to knockout phase	2–1	—	2–1	2–1
3	(Belgium) Standard Liège	6	3	1	2	7	9	−2	10		1–0	2–1	—	2–1
4	(Turkey) Akhisarspor	6	0	1	5	4	14	−10	1		2–3	0–1	0–0	—

Source: UEFA
Rules for classification: Group stage tiebreakers
Notes:

Win Draw Loss

20 September 2018 1	Sevilla (Spain)	5–1	(Belgium) Standard Liège	Ramón Sánchez Pizjuán, Seville
18:55	Banega 8', 74' (pen.); Vázquez 41'; Ben Yedder 49', 70'	Report	Djenepo 39'	Attendance: 30,003; Referee: Gediminas Mažeika (Lithuania)

4 October 2018 2	Standard Liège (Belgium)	2–1	(Turkey) Akhisarspor	Stade Maurice Dufrasne, Liège
21:00	Emond 17'; Djenepo 40'	Report	Ayık 32'	Attendance: 8,233; Referee: Manuel Schüttengruber (Austria)

25 October 2018 3	Standard Liège (Belgium)	2–1	(Russia) Krasnodar	Stade Maurice Dufrasne, Liège
21:00	Emond 47'; Laifis 90+3'	Report	Ari 39'	Attendance: 8,393; Referee: Marco Guida (Italy)

8 November 2018 4	Krasnodar (Russia)	2–1	(Belgium) Standard Liège	Krasnodar Stadium, Krasnodar
18:55 (20:55 MSK)	Suleymanov 79'; Wanderson 82'	Report	Carcela 19'	Attendance: 21,526; Referee: Aleksandar Stavrev (Macedonia)

29 November 2018 5	Standard Liège (Belgium)	1–0	(Spain) Sevilla	Stade Maurice Dufrasne, Liège
21:00	Djenepo 62'	Report		Attendance: 12,882; Referee: Daniel Siebert (Germany)

13 December 2018 6	Akhisarspor (Turkey)	0–0	(Belgium) Standard Liège	Spor Toto Akhisar Stadium, Akhisar
18:55 (20:55 TRT)		Report		Attendance: 2,674; Referee: Ádám Farkas (Hungary)

== Statistics ==
=== Appearances and goals ===
No.	Pos	Nat	Player	Total		Belgian First Division A		Super Cup		Belgian Cup		Champions League		Europa League	
No.	Pos	Nat	Player	Apps	Goals	Apps	Goals	Apps	Goals	Apps	Goals	Apps	Goals	Apps	Goals
Goalkeepers
1	GK	(Belgium) BEL	Jean-François Gillet	2	0	0	0	1	0	1	0	0	0	0	0
13	GK	(Mexico) MEX	Guillermo Ochoa	48	0	40	0	0	0	0	0	2	0	6	0
16	GK	(Belgium) BEL	Arnaud Bodart	0	0	0	0	0	0	0	0	0	0	0	0
Defenders
2	DF	(Haiti) HAI	Réginal Goreux	5	0	2+3	0	0	0	0	0	0	0	0	0
3	DF	(Belgium) BEL	Zinho Vanheusden	30	2	22+4	2	0	0	0	0	0	0	4	0
6	DF	(Serbia) SRB	Miloš Kosanović	22	1	15+5	1	0	0	1	0	0	0	1	0
15	DF	(Belgium) BEL	Sébastien Pocognoli	11	0	6+2	0	1	0	0	0	0	0	2	0
21	DF	(Cameroon) CMR	Collins Fai	38	1	30	1	0+1	0	0	0	2	0	5	0
23	DF	(Belgium) BEL	Senna Miangue	6	0	4+2	0	0	0	0	0	0	0	0	0
27	DF	(Kosovo) KOS	Mërgim Vojvoda	0	0	0	0	0	0	0	0	0	0	0	0
29	DF	(Belgium) BEL	Luis Pedro Cavanda	27	1	17+3	1	1	0	1	0	2	0	3	0
34	DF	(Cyprus) CYP	Konstantinos Laifis	48	2	38+1	1	1	0	1	0	2	0	5	1
Midfielders
8	MF	(Bosnia and Herzegovina) BIH	Gojko Cimirot	46	0	36+2	0	0	0	1	0	0+2	0	5	0
10	MF	(Morocco) MAR	Mehdi Carcela	46	7	30+7	5	0	0	1	0	2	1	6	1
11	MF	(Croatia) CRO	Alen Halilović	14	0	5+9	0	0	0	0	0	0	0	0	0
18	MF	(Romania) ROU	Răzvan Marin	47	10	35+3	10	1	0	0	0	2	0	5+1	0
19	MF	(Mali) MLI	Moussa Djenepo	40	11	24+8	8	0+1	0	0	0	0+2	0	4+1	3
20	MF	(Democratic Republic of the Congo) COD	Merveille Bokadi	13	1	12+1	1	0	0	0	0	0	0	0	0
22	MF	(Belgium) BEL	Maxime Lestienne	33	5	18+9	5	0	0	1	0	0	0	2+3	0
28	MF	(Belgium) BEL	Samuel Bastien	30	2	14+9	2	1	0	0	0	2	0	2+2	0
30	MF	(Albania) ALB	Lindon Selahi	0	0	0	0	0	0	0	0	0	0	0	0
31	MF	(Democratic Republic of the Congo) COD	William Balikwisha	6	0	0+5	0	0	0	1	0	0	0	0	0
37	MF	(Belgium) BEL	Nicolas Raskin	0	0	0	0	0	0	0	0	0	0	0	0
40	MF	(Democratic Republic of the Congo) COD	Paul-José M'Poku	37	8	27+3	8	1	0	0	0	2	0	1+3	0
Forwards
9	FW	(Belgium) BEL	Renaud Emond	44	16	31+3	13	0+1	0	0+1	0	1+1	1	4+2	2
17	FW	(Belgium) BEL	Obbi Oulare	7	1	4+2	1	0	0	0	0	0	0	0+1	0
70	FW	(Portugal) POR	Orlando Sá	26	2	3+15	1	0	0	1	1	1+1	0	2+3	0
Players transferred out during the season
5	MF	(Nigeria) NGR	Uche Agbo	18	0	7+3	0	1	0	1	0	2	0	3+1	0
7	FW	(Croatia) CRO	Duje Čop	3	0	0+2	0	1	0	0	0	0	0	0	0
11	FW	(Brazil) BRA	Carlinhos	3	0	0+2	0	0	0	0+1	0	0	0	0	0
22	MF	(Belgium) BEL	Edmilson	1	1	0	0	1	1	0	0	0	0	0	0
26	DF	(Democratic Republic of the Congo) COD	Christian Luyindama	30	3	20	3	1	0	1	0	2	0	6	0

Last updated: 19 May 2019
