= Zinho Vanheusden =

Belgian footballer

Personal information
- Date of birth: 29 July 1999 (age 27)
- Place of birth: Hasselt, Belgium
- Height: 1.87 m (6 ft 2 in)
- Position: Centre-back

Youth career
- 2008–2015: Standard Liège
- 2015–2018: Inter Milan

Senior career*
Years	Team	Apps	(Gls)
2018–2019	Inter Milan	0	(0)
2018–2019	→ Standard Liège (loan)	27	(2)
2019–2021	Standard Liège	28	(1)
2021–2025	Inter Milan	0	(0)
2021–2022	→ Genoa (loan)	14	(0)
2022–2023	→ AZ (loan)	7	(0)
2023–2024	→ Standard Liège (loan)	21	(0)
2024–2025	→ KV Mechelen (loan)	2	(0)
2025	Marbella	7	(0)
Total		106	(3)

International career
2014–2015	Belgium U16	11	(1)
2015–2016	Belgium U17	14	(6)
2016–2017	Belgium U18	2	(0)
2017	Belgium U19	2	(0)
2017–2020	Belgium U21	11	(2)
2020	Belgium	1	(0)
- * Club domestic league appearances and goals

Zinho Vanheusden (born 29 July 1999) is a Belgian former professional footballer who played as a centre-back.

== Club career ==
=== Inter Milan ===
In mid-2015, Vanheusden joined Inter Milan's youth academy after seven seasons in the Standard Liège youth system. He was promoted to the first team in the last few matches of 2016–17 Serie A; he also appeared as an unused bench for a few matches at the start of 2017–18 Serie A. He also played for the under-19 team as the starting defender, winning 2016–17 Campionato Nazionale Primavera. On 27 September 2017, Vanheusden injured his cruciate ligament in a UEFA Youth League match against Dynamo Kyiv, which kept him out of action for four months. On 26 January 2018, Vanheusden extended his contract with Inter until June 2022.

==== Loan to Standard Liège ====
On 30 January 2018, Vanheusden joined Standard Liège until 30 June 2018, with an option to extend for one more year. Vanheusden made his professional debut in a 1–0 Belgian First Division A playoff win over Gent on 14 April 2018.

=== Standard Liège ===
On 28 June 2019, Standard Liège signed Vanheusden in a permanent deal for a reported €12.5 million fee, which surpassed Nicolae Stanciu's record as the most expensive purchase by a Belgium club.

=== Return to Inter Milan ===
On 13 July 2021, he returned to Inter Milan.

==== Loan to Genoa ====
On 20 July, he was sent on loan to Genoa. He made his Serie A debut on 21 August against Inter away, at the Giuseppe Meazza in a 4–0 loss to his team.

==== Loan to AZ ====
On 25 July 2022, Vanheusden was loaned by AZ in the Netherlands, with an option to buy.

==== Loan to Standard Liège ====
On 8 July 2023, he returned to Standard Liège for the upcoming season.

==== Loan to KV Mechelen ====
On 25 July 2024, he joined KV Mechelen for a season-long loan, with an option to buy.

=== Marbella ===
On 7 August 2025, Vanheusden joined Spanish side Marbella, signing a one-year contract.

On 21 November 2025, Vanheusden announced his retirement from professional football at the age of 26, due to recurring injuries.

== International career ==
Vanheusden debuted with the Belgium national team in a 1–1 friendly draw with Ivory Coast on 8 October 2020.

== Personal life ==
Vanheusden is named after the Brazilian footballer, Zinho after his performance at the 1994 FIFA World Cup.

== Career statistics ==
=== Club ===
As of match played 24 November 2024

Appearances and goals by club, season and competition
Club	Season	League			National cup		Europe		Other		Total	
Club	Season	Division	Apps	Goals	Apps	Goals	Apps	Goals	Apps	Goals	Apps	Goals
Standard Liège (loan)	2017–18	Belgian Pro League	1	0	0	0	0	0	–		1	0
Standard Liège (loan)	2018–19	Belgian Pro League	26	2	0	0	4 (Note: Appearances in UEFA Europa League)	0	–		30	2
Standard Liège	2019–20	Belgian Pro League	20	1	3	0	5	1	–		28	2
Standard Liège	2020–21	Belgian Pro League	8	0	0	0	5	0	4 (Note: Appearances in Belgian Pro League European play-offs)	0	17	0
Standard Liège	Total		55	3	3	0	14	1	4	0	76	4
Genoa (loan)	2021–22	Serie A	14	0	2	0	–		–		16	0
AZ (loan)	2022–23	Eredivisie	7	0	0	0	1 (Note: Appearance in UEFA Europa Conference League)	0	–		8	0
Standard Liège (loan)	2023–24	Belgian Pro League	21	0	2	0	–		1	0	24	0
KV Mechelen (loan)	2024–25	Belgian Pro League	2	0	1	0	–		–		3	0
Career total			99	3	8	0	15	1	5	0	127	4
