= Obbi Oularé =

Belgian footballer (born 1996)

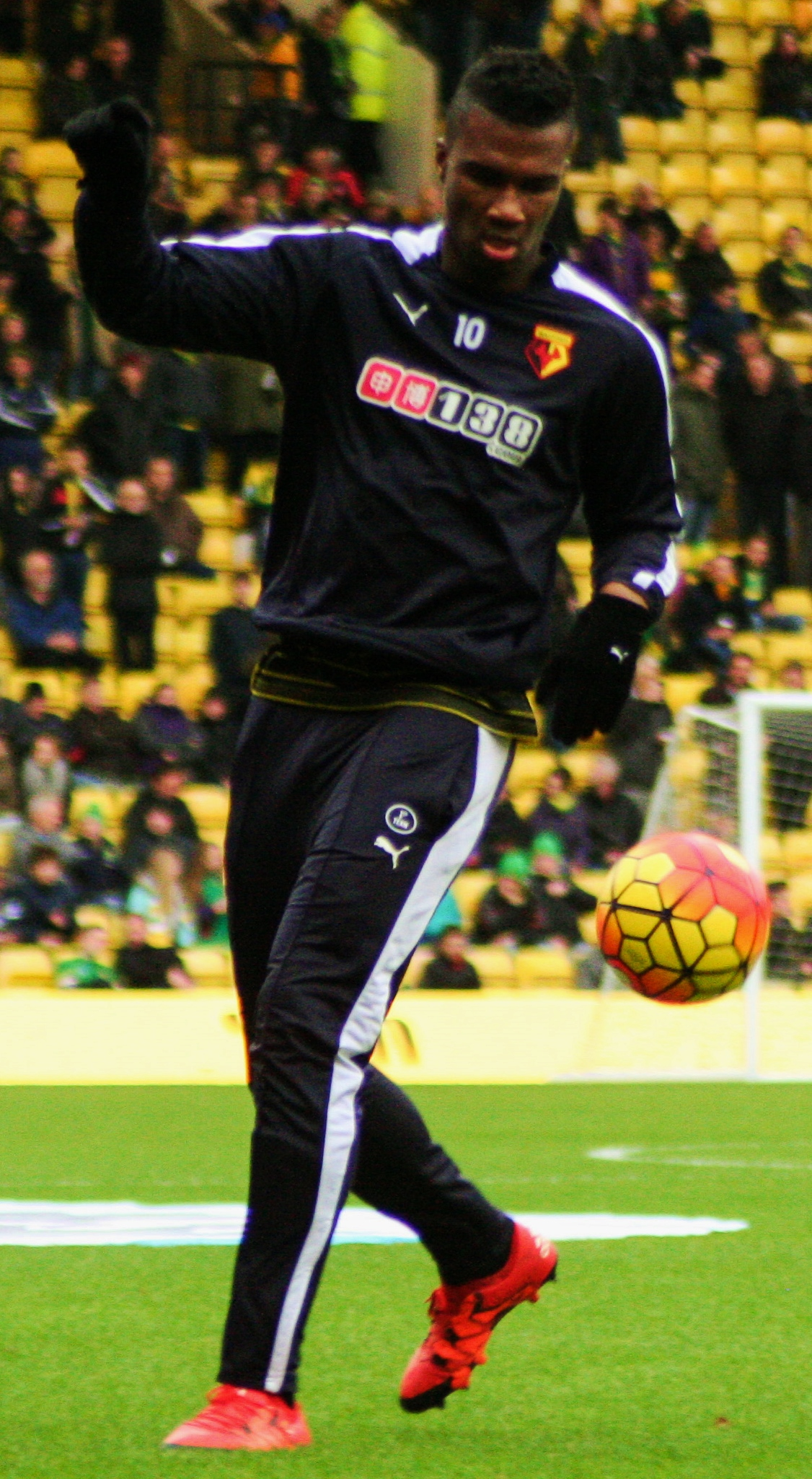
- Oularé with Watford

Personal information
- Full name: Mamadou Obbi Oularé
- Date of birth: 8 January 1996 (age 30)
- Place of birth: Waregem, Belgium
- Height: 1.94 m (6 ft 4 in)
- Position: Forward

Youth career
- 2003–2005: F.C. Brussels
- 2005–2006: Anderlecht
- 2006–2011: Lille
- 2011–2012: ES Wasquehal
- 2012–2013: Standard Liège
- 2013–2014: Club Brugge

Senior career*
Years	Team	Apps	(Gls)
2014–2015	Club Brugge	25	(4)
2015–2019	Watford	2	(0)
2016–2017	→ Zulte Waregem (loan)	10	(1)
2017	→ Willem II (loan)	11	(3)
2017–2018	→ Antwerp (loan)	16	(3)
2018–2019	→ Standard Liège (loan)	6	(1)
2019–2021	Standard Liège	26	(4)
2021–2023	Barnsley	2	(0)
2022–2023	→ RWDM (loan)	4	(0)
2023–2025	Lierse Kempenzonen	22	(5)

International career^{‡}
2013–2014	Belgium U18	6	(4)
2014	Belgium U19	5	(6)
2015–2019	Belgium U21	7	(1)
- * Club domestic league appearances and goals as of 1 February 2025 ‡ National team caps and goals as of 21:24, 5 June 2019 (UTC)

Mamadou Obbi Oularé (born 8 January 1996) is a Belgian professional footballer. He is the son of former professional Guinean footballer Souleymane Oularé.

== Club career ==
=== Club Brugge ===
Oularé came through the youth ranks at Lille OSC and signed for Belgian side Club Brugge in 2013. He made his Belgian Pro League debut on 14 September 2014 against K.R.C. Genk. He replaced Nikola Storm after 64 minutes. His first league start came on 21 September 2014 against K.V. Kortrijk, in which he also scored his first league goal in a man of the match performance. On 20 August 2015, while playing for Club Brugge, Oularé tweeted an apology for his lackluster performance coming off the bench against Manchester United in a Champions League playoff game at Old Trafford. Earlier that day, it was widely reported in the Belgian press that Club Brugge's manager Michel Preud'homme had given Oularé a dressing down in front of his teammates in the dressing room after that game.

=== Watford ===
On 1 September 2015, Oularé signed for Premier League side Watford for an undisclosed fee rumored to be around £6 million on a five-year contract. He made his debut for the club in an FA Cup tie against Newcastle United on 9 January 2016. He was substituted at half time. He made his Premier League debut, against Swansea City in a 1–0 Watford defeat, coming on as a substitute for Valon Behrami in the 87th minute.

=== Barnsley ===
On 26 July 2021, Oularé signed a three-year contract with EFL Championship side Barnsley. On 1 February 2022, Oularé returned to his native Belgium by joining Belgian First Division B side RWD Molenbeek on loan for the remainder of the 2021–22 season.

=== Lierse ===
On 25 May 2023, Oularé agreed to move to Lierse Kempenzonen on a two-year contract.

== Career statistics ==
As of end of 2023–24 season

Appearances and goals by club, season and competition
Club	Season	League			National cup		League cup		Other		Total	
Club	Season	Division	Apps	Goals	Apps	Goals	Apps	Goals	Apps	Goals	Apps	Goals
Club Brugge	2014–15	Belgian Pro League	19	3	3	2	—		8 (Note: Appearances in the Europa League)	2	30	7
Club Brugge	2015–16	Belgian Pro League	6	1	0	0	—		3 (Note: Two appearances, one goal in the Champions League; one appearance in the Belgian Super Cup)	1	9	2
Club Brugge	Total		25	4	3	2	—		11	3	39	9
Watford	2015–16	Premier League	2	0	1	0	0	0	—		3	0
Zulte Waregem (loan)	2016–17	Belgian First Division A	10	1	1	0	—		—		11	1
Willem II (loan)	2016–17	Eredivisie	11	3	0	0	—		0	0	11	3
Antwerp (loan)	2017–18	Belgian First Division A	16	3	0	0	—		0	0	16	3
Standard Liège (loan)	2018–19	Belgian First Division A	6	1	0	0	—		1	0	7	1
Standard Liège	2019–20	Belgian First Division A	14	2	0	0	—		3	0	17	2
Standard Liège	2020–21	Belgian First Division A	12	2	0	0	—		6	0	18	2
Standard Liège	Total		26	4	0	0	0	0	9	0	35	4
Barnsley	2021–22	Championship	2	0	0	0	0	0	0	0	2	0
Barnsley	2022–23	League One	0	0	0	0	0	0	0	0	0	0
Barnsley	Total		2	0	0	0	0	0	0	0	2	0
RWDM (loan)	2021–22	Challenger Pro League	3	0	0	0	—		2 (Note: Appearances in Challenger Pro League promotion play-offs)	0	5	0
RWDM (loan)	2022–23	Challenger Pro League	1	0	0	0	—		0	0	1	0
Lierse Kempenzonen	2023–24	Challenger Pro League	22	5	2	0	—		0	0	24	5
Career total			124	21	7	2	0	0	23	3	154	26

== Honours ==
Club Brugge

- Belgian Cup: 2014–15
