= Arnaud Bodart =

Belgian footballer

Personal information
- Date of birth: 11 March 1998 (age 28)
- Place of birth: Seraing, Belgium
- Height: 1.87 m (6 ft 2 in)
- Position: Goalkeeper

Team information
- Current team: Le Havre

Youth career
- 2006–2017: Standard Liège

Senior career*
| Years | Team | Apps | (Gls) |
| 2017–2025 | Standard Liège | 170 | (1) |
| 2025 | Metz | 17 | (0) |
| 2025–2026 | Lille | 3 | (0) |
| 2026– | Le Havre | 0 | (0) |

International career^{‡}
| 2015 | Belgium U17 | 1 | (0) |
| 2016 | Belgium U18 | 1 | (0) |
| 2020 | Belgium U21 | 3 | (0) |
- * Club domestic league appearances and goals as of 19:15, 22 March 2026 (UTC) ‡ National team caps and goals as of 23:16, 6 June 2023 (UTC)

Arnaud Bodart (born 11 March 1998) is a Belgian professional footballer who plays as a goalkeeper for Ligue 1 club Le Havre.

== Club career ==
Bodart is a youth product of Standard Liège, having joined at the age of 8 and working his way up all their youth categories. On 15 May 2017, he signed his first professional contract with the club. He made his professional debut with them in a 3–1 Belgian First Division A win over Waasland-Beveren on 16 May 2017. He scored his first and only professional goal in extra time in a 2–2 league tie with KAS Eupen on 21 November 2020. On 6 August 2021, he extended his contract with the club until 2025.

On 9 January 2025, Bodart signed a contract with Metz in France until 30 June 2025.

On 1 July 2025, he officially signed for Ligue 1 club Lille on a two-year contract after leaving Metz unattached, joining the Northern France side as a back-up goalkeeper behind Lucas Chevalier.

== International career ==
Bodart is a former youth international for Belgium, having represented them up to the Belgium U21s. He was called up to the senior Belgium national team for a set of UEFA Euro 2024 qualifying matches in June 2023.

== Personal life ==
Bodart is the nephew of the Belgian former goalkeeper and international footballer Gilbert Bodart.

== Career statistics ==
As of match played 22 March 2026

Appearances and goals by club, season and competition
| Club | Season | League | | | National cup (Note: Includes Belgian Cup, Coupe de France) | | Continental | | Other | | Total | |
| Club | Season | Division | Apps | Goals | Apps | Goals | Apps | Goals | Apps | Goals | Apps | Goals |
|---|---|---|---|---|---|---|---|---|---|---|---|---|
| Standard Liège | 2016–17 | Belgian First Division A | 0 | 0 | — | | — | | 2 | 0 | 2 | 0 |
| Standard Liège | 2018–19 | Belgian First Division A | 0 | 0 | 0 | 0 | 0 | 0 | 0 | 0 | 0 | 0 |
| Standard Liège | 2019–20 | Belgian First Division A | 29 | 0 | 3 | 0 | 3 (Note: Appearances in UEFA Europa League) | 0 | — | | 35 | 0 |
| Standard Liège | 2020–21 | Belgian First Division A | 33 | 1 | 4 | 0 | 9 | 0 | 4 | 0 | 50 | 1 |
| Standard Liège | 2021–22 | Belgian First Division A | 26 | 0 | 0 | 0 | — | | — | | 26 | 0 |
| Standard Liège | 2022–23 | Belgian Pro League | 34 | 0 | 1 | 0 | — | | 6 | 0 | 41 | 0 |
| Standard Liège | 2023–24 | Belgian Pro League | 34 | 0 | 0 | 0 | — | | — | | 34 | 0 |
| Standard Liège | 2024–25 | Belgian Pro League | 2 | 0 | 0 | 0 | — | | — | | 2 | 0 |
| Standard Liège | Total | | 158 | 1 | 8 | 0 | 12 | 0 | 12 | 0 | 190 | 1 |
| Metz | 2024–25 | Ligue 2 | 17 | 0 | — | | — | | — | | 17 | 0 |
| Lille | 2025–26 | Ligue 1 | 3 | 0 | 2 | 0 | 0 | 0 | — | | 5 | 0 |
| Career total | | | 178 | 1 | 10 | 0 | 12 | 0 | 12 | 0 | 212 | 1 |
