= Allan Delferrière =

Belgian footballer

Personal information
- Full name: Allan Michaël Delferrière
- Date of birth: 3 March 2002 (age 24)
- Place of birth: Liège, Belgium
- Height: 1.83 m (6 ft 0 in)
- Position: Midfielder

Team information
- Current team: Tubize-Braine
- Number: 18

Youth career
- Standard Liège

Senior career*
Years	Team	Apps	(Gls)
2021–2022	Standard Liège	5	(0)
2021–2022	→ MVV (loan)	19	(0)
2022–2025	Hibernian	5	(0)
2022	→ FC Edinburgh (loan)	15	(0)
2024	→ MFK Vyškov (loan)	12	(0)
2024–2025	→ Racing Union (loan)	22	(0)
2026–	Tubize-Braine	0	(0)

International career
2017	Belgium U15	1	(0)
- * Club domestic league appearances and goals as of 6 February 2026

Allan Michaël Delferrière (born 3 March 2002) is a Belgian professional footballer who plays as a midfielder for Belgian club Tubize-Braine.

== Club career ==
Delferriere made his professional debut with Standard Liège in a 6–2 Belgian First Division A loss to Oostende on 1 May 2021, coming on as a late sub in the 68th minute.

On 23 July 2021, he joined MVV in the Netherlands on a season-long loan.

On 1 February 2022, Delferrière's loan deal at MVV came to an end in order for him to join Hibernian on a two-and-a-half-year deal. He was loaned to FC Edinburgh in August 2022, Czech club MFK Vyškov in January 2024. and Luxembourg club Racing Union for the 2024–25 season. He was released from his contract with Hibs in July 2025.

== Career statistics ==
As of match played on 11 November 2023

Appearances and goals by club, season and competition
Club	Season	League			National cup		League cup		Other		Total	
Club	Season	Division	Apps	Goals	Apps	Goals	Apps	Goals	Apps	Goals	Apps	Goals
Standard Liège	2020–21	Belgian First Division A	5	0	0	0	—		0	0	5	0
Standard Liège	2020–21	Belgian First Division A	0	0	0	0	—		—		0	0
Standard Liège	Total		5	0	0	0	0	0	0	0	5	0
MVV Maastricht (loan)	2021–22	Eerste Divisie	19	0	2	0	—		—		21	0
Hibernian	2021–22	Scottish Premiership	1	0	0	0	0	0	0	0	1	0
Hibernian	2022–23	Scottish Premiership	1	0	0	0	0	0	0	0	1	0
Hibernian	2023–24	Scottish Premiership	3	0	0	0	1	0	3	0	7	0
Hibernian	Total		5	0	0	0	1	0	3	0	9	0
Edinburgh (loan)	2022–23	Scottish League One	15	0	0	0	0	0	0	0	15	0
Career total			44	0	2	0	1	0	3	0	50	0
