= Nicolas Raskin =

Belgian footballer (born 2001)

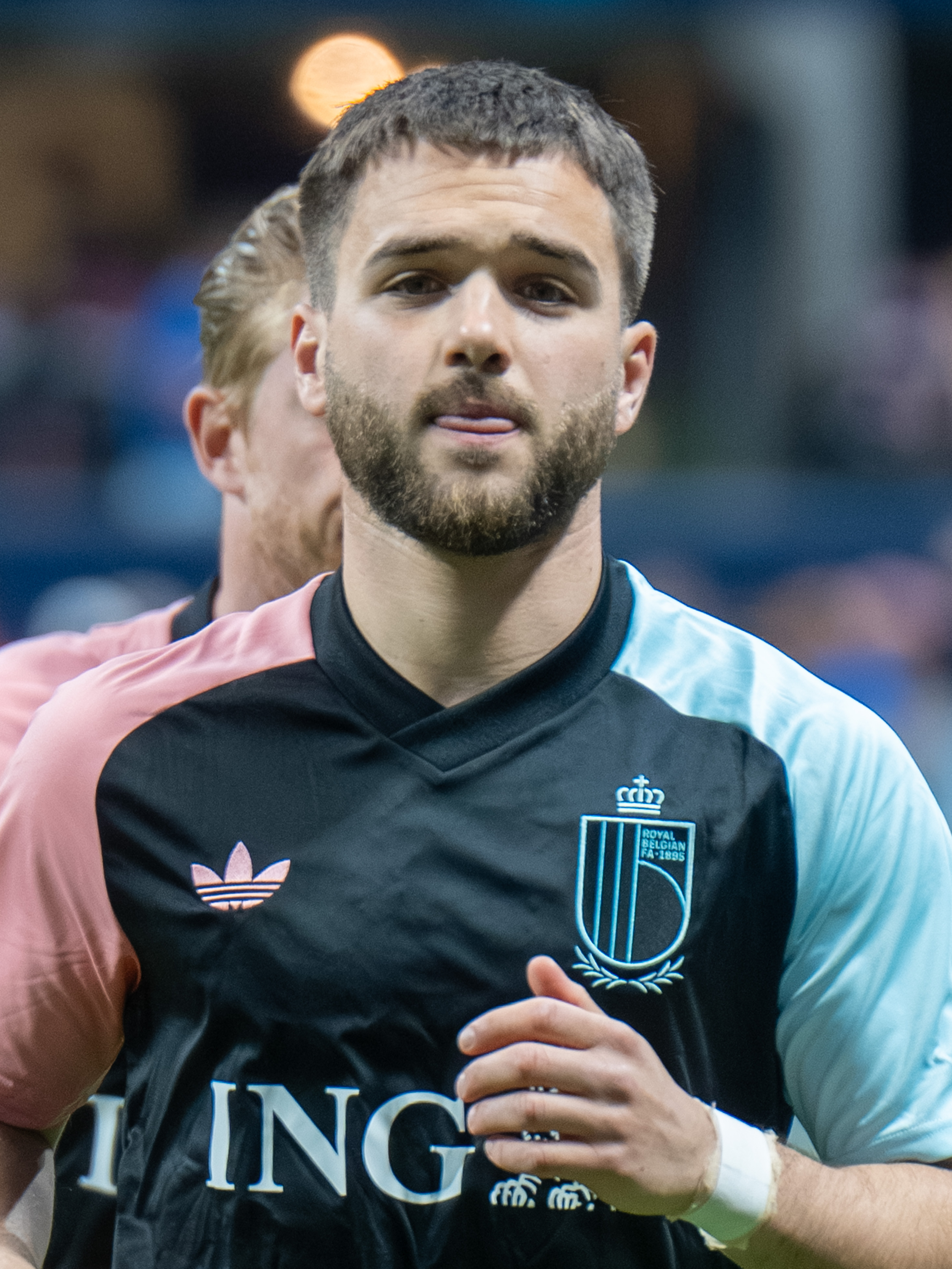
- Raskin with Belgium in 2026

Personal information
- Full name: Nicolas Thierry Yvan Raskin
- Date of birth: 23 February 2001 (age 25)
- Place of birth: Liège, Belgium
- Height: 1.79 m (5 ft 10 in)
- Position: Midfielder

Team information
- Current team: Rangers
- Number: 43

Youth career
- Royal Stade Waremmien FC
- 2008–2015: Standard Liège
- 2015–2017: Anderlecht
- 2017–2018: Gent

Senior career*
Years	Team	Apps	(Gls)
2018–2019	Gent	1	(0)
2019–2023	Standard Liège	80	(4)
2023–	Rangers	107	(12)

International career^{‡}
2016	Belgium U15	4	(0)
2016–2017	Belgium U16	12	(0)
2017–2018	Belgium U17	14	(0)
2018–2019	Belgium U18	6	(0)
2019–2020	Belgium U19	8	(1)
2021–2023	Belgium U21	10	(3)
2025–	Belgium	24	(2)
- * Club domestic league appearances and goals as of 03:11, 22 November 2026 (UTC) ‡ National team caps and goals as of 22:55, 15 November 2026 (UTC)

Nicolas Thierry Yvan Raskin (French pronunciation: [nikɔla ʁaskɛ̃]; born 23 February 2001) is a Belgian professional footballer who plays as a midfielder for Scottish Premiership club Rangers and the Belgium national team.

Raskin had spells in the youth academies of Standard Liège and Anderlecht before joining Gent in 2017. He made his competitive debut for Gent in February 2018, becoming the first player born in the 21st century to play in the Belgian Pro League. He re-joined Standard Liège in January 2019, and signed for Rangers four years later.

Raskin earned more than 50 caps for Belgium's youth national teams. He represented the country from under-15 to under-21 level. He made his senior international debut in March 2025, and was a member of Belgium's squad at the 2026 FIFA World Cup.

== Club career ==
=== Early career ===
Raskin's first club as a child was Royal Stade Waremmien FC, before playing youth football for Standard Liège from 2008 to 2015. He then spent two years in Anderlecht's youth academy. In May 2017, Raskin left Anderlecht to join Gent, signing a three-year contract. Raskin made his professional debut for Gent at the age of 16 in a 3–0 Belgian Pro League win over Sint-Truiden in February 2018, becoming the first player born in the 21st century to play in the league.

=== Standard Liège ===
On 23 January 2019, Raskin returned to his former youth club Standard Liège.

=== Rangers ===
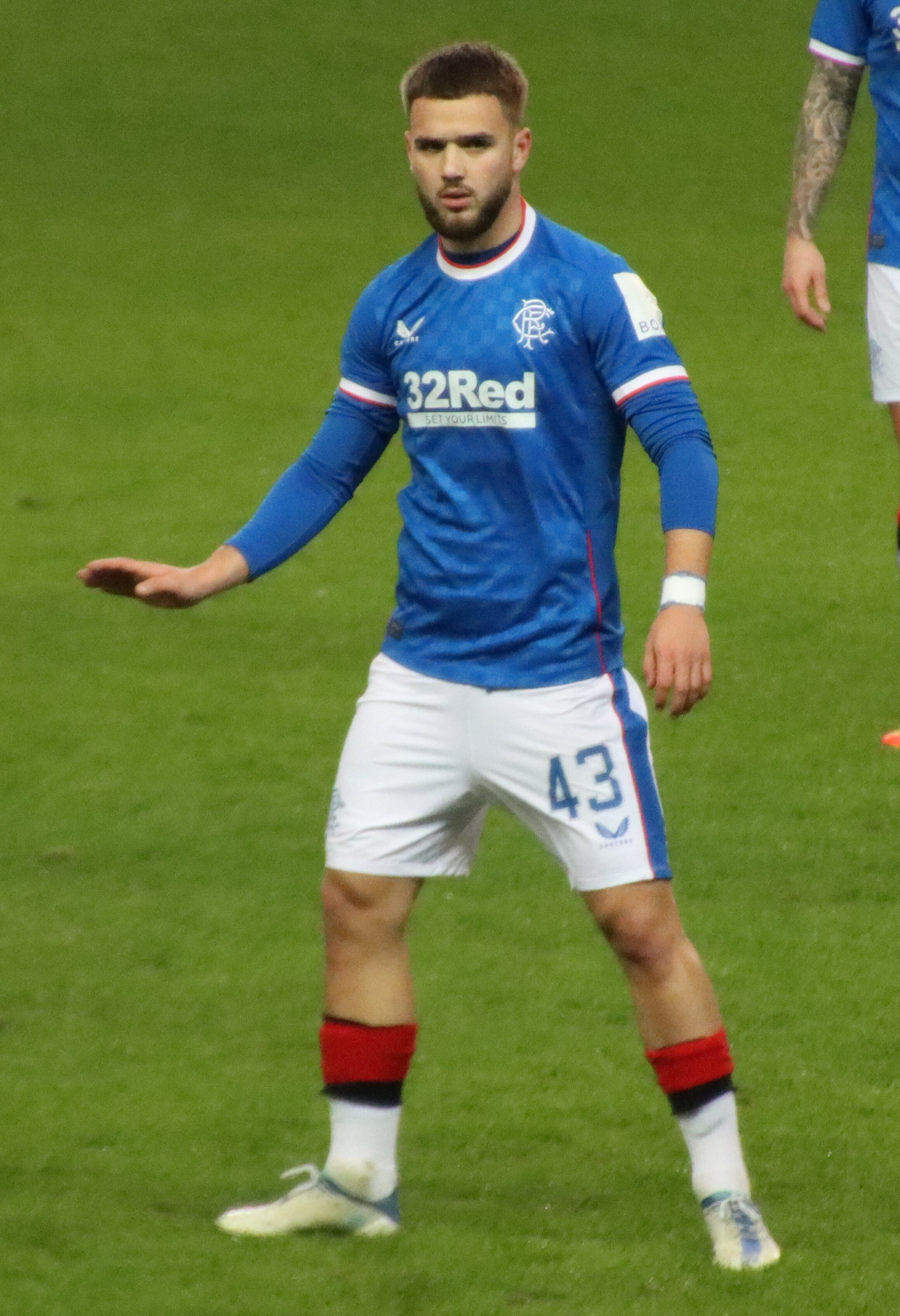
Raskin playing for Rangers in 2023.

On 31 January 2023, Raskin joined Scottish club Rangers on a long-term contract for an undisclosed transfer fee. It was reported that the fee paid was £1.5 million plus additional bonuses, and Raskin signed a four-and-a-half-year contract. He made his debut four days later, in a 2–1 victory over Ross County in the Scottish Premiership.

== International career ==
Raskin playing for Belgium at the 2026 FIFA World Cup

Raskin played youth international football for Belgium at the under-15, under-16, under-17, under-18, under-19 and under-21 levels.

He represented the Belgium under-17 team at the 2018 UEFA European Under-17 Championship. In June 2023, he scored both goals for the Belgium under-21 team in a 2–0 win over Israel. The same summer, he was named in the Belgian squad for the 2023 UEFA European Under-21 Championship.

On 14 March 2025, Raskin was called up to the senior Belgium squad for the first time. Raskin made his debut on 20 March 2025, replacing Koni De Winter in the 80th minute of a defeat to Ukraine in a UEFA Nations League relegation play-off tie.

On 15 May 2026, he was named in Belgium's squad for the 2026 FIFA World Cup.

== Personal life ==
Raskin was born in Liège. He is the son of Thierry Raskin, who was also a professional footballer in Belgium.

== Career statistics ==
=== Club ===
As of match played 21 November 2026

Appearances and goals by club, season and competition
Club	Season	League			National cup (Note: Includes Belgian Cup, Scottish Cup)		League cup (Note: Includes Scottish League Cup)		Europe		Total	
Club	Season	Division	Apps	Goals	Apps	Goals	Apps	Goals	Apps	Goals	Apps	Goals
Gent	2017–18	Belgian Pro League	1	0	0	0	—		0	0	1	0
Gent	2018–19	Belgian Pro League	0	0	0	0	—		0	0	0	0
Gent	Total		1	0	0	0	—		0	0	1	0
Standard Liège	2018–19	Belgian Pro League	0	0	—		—		—		0	0
Standard Liège	2019–20	Belgian Pro League	2	0	1	0	—		0	0	3	0
Standard Liège	2020–21	Belgian Pro League	32	2	5	0	—		6 (Note: Appearances in UEFA Europa League)	1	43	3
Standard Liège	2021–22	Belgian Pro League	29	1	2	0	—		—		31	1
Standard Liège	2022–23	Belgian Pro League	17	1	1	0	—		—		18	1
Standard Liège	Total		80	4	9	0	—		6	1	95	5
Rangers	2022–23	Scottish Premiership	12	0	3	0	1	0	—		16	0
Rangers	2023–24	Scottish Premiership	18	1	5	0	0	0	8 (Note: Four appearances in UEFA Champions League, four appearances in UEFA Europa League)	0	31	1
Rangers	2024–25	Scottish Premiership	33	4	1	0	2	0	12	1	48	5
Rangers	2025–26	Scottish Premiership	33	6	1	0	2	1	14 (Note: Six appearances in UEFA Champions League, eight appearances in UEFA Europa League)	0	50	7
Rangers	2026–27	Scottish Premiership	11	1	0	0	3	0	2	0	16	1
Rangers	Total		107	12	10	0	8	1	36	1	161	14
Career total			188	16	19	0	8	1	42	2	257	19

=== International ===
As of match played 15 November 2026

Appearances and goals by national team and year
National team	Year	Apps	Goals
Belgium	2025	9	1
Belgium	2026	15	1
Total		24	2

Scores and results list Belgium's goal tally first, score column indicates score after each Raskin goal.

List of international goals scored by Nicolas Raskin
No.	Date	Venue	Cap	Opponent	Score	Result	Competition
1	7 September 2025	Constant Vanden Stock Stadium, Anderlecht, Belgium	5	Kazakhstan	3–0	6–0	2026 FIFA World Cup qualification
2	6 June 2026	King Baudouin Stadium, Brussels, Belgium	13	Tunisia	5–0	5–0	Friendly

== Honours ==
Standard Liège

- Belgian Cup runner-up: 2020–21

Rangers

- Scottish League Cup runner-up: 2022–23
