= Mërgim Vojvoda =

Kosovan footballer (born 1995)

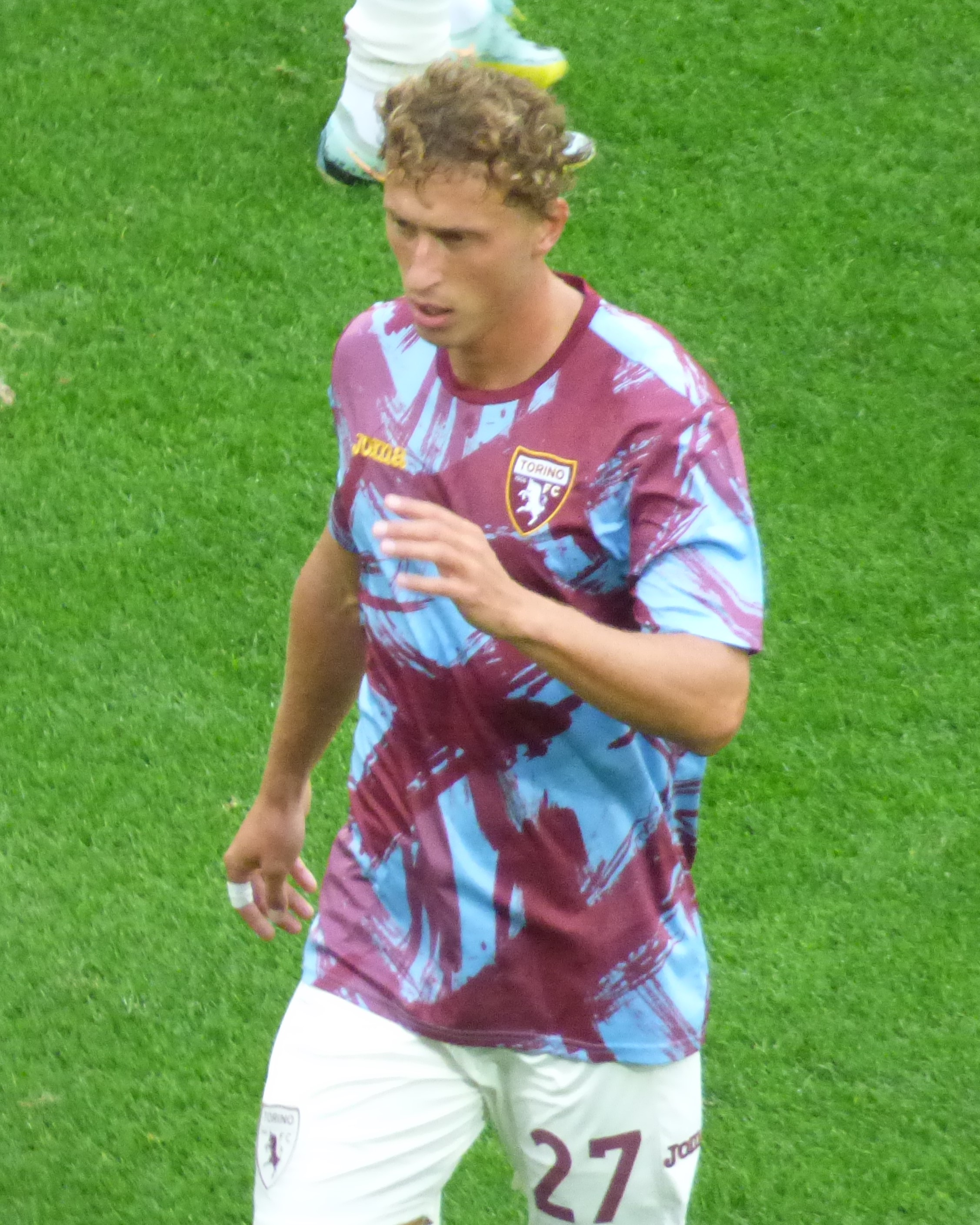
- Vojvoda with Torino in 2023

Personal information
- Date of birth: 1 February 1995 (age 31)
- Place of birth: Llaushë, FR Yugoslavia
- Height: 1.87 m (6 ft 2 in)
- Positions: Right wing-back; right-back

Team information
- Current team: Udinese
- Number: 23

Youth career
- 2003–2009: JS Pierreuse
- 2009–2010: CSJ Grivegnée
- 2010–2011: MVV Maastricht
- 2011–2013: Standard Liège

Senior career*
Years	Team	Apps	(Gls)
2013–2016	Standard Liège	0	(0)
2014–2015	→ Sint-Truidense (loan)	4	(0)
2015–2016	→ Carl Zeiss Jena (loan)	24	(0)
2016–2019	Mouscron	76	(1)
2019–2020	Standard Liège	28	(1)
2020–2025	Torino	127	(2)
2025–2026	Como	41	(3)
2026–	Udinese	12	(0)

International career^{‡}
2014–2016	Albania U21	7	(0)
2017–	Kosovo	81	(3)
- * Club domestic league appearances and goals as of 15:55, 22 November 2026 (UTC) ‡ National team caps and goals as of 21:35, 17 November 2026 (UTC)

Mërgim Vojvoda (born 1 February 1995) is a Kosovan professional footballer who plays as a right wing-back or right-back for Serie A club Udinese and the Kosovo national team.

Vojvoda is the Kosovo national team's most-capped player.

== Club career ==
=== Early career ===
Vojvoda is a product of youth team systems of the different Belgian and Dutch sides such as JS Pierreuse, CSJ Grivegnée and MVV Maastricht. In 2011 at the age of 16, he joined with youth team of Standard Liège.

==== Loan at Sint-Truiden ====
On 20 August 2014, Vojvoda joined Belgian Second Division side Sint-Truidense, on a season-long loan. On 8 November 2014, he made his debut in a 1–0 away win against Roeselare after coming on as a substitute at 63rd minute in place of Pierre-Baptiste Baherlé.

==== Loan at Carl Zeiss Jena ====
On 22 June 2015, Vojvoda joined Regionalliga Nordost side Carl Zeiss Jena, on a season-long loan. One month later, he made his debut in a 3–0 away win against VfB Auerbach after coming on as a substitute at 73rd minute in place of Sören Eismann.

=== Mouscron ===
On 25 June 2016, Vojvoda joined Belgian First Division A side Mouscron. As part of the deal, Standard Liège secured a sell-on clause guaranteeing them 25% of the profits of a future transfer. On 30 July 2016, he made his debut as a professional footballer in a 2–1 home defeat against Anderlecht after being named in the starting line-up.

=== Return to Standard Liège ===
On 27 May 2019, Vojvoda signed a three-year contract with Belgian First Division A club Standard Liège and received squad number 27. Two years later, he made his debut in a 2–0 away win against Cercle Brugge after being named in the starting line-up.

=== Torino ===
On 27 August 2020, Vojvoda signed a four-year contract with Serie A club Torino. Torino reportedly paid a €5.5 million transfer fee. He scored his first goal for the club on 3 May 2021 in a 1–0 home win against Parma.

=== Como ===
On 3 February 2025, Vojvoda signed a contract with Como for three and a half years.

=== Udinese ===
On 18 July 2026, Vojvoda completed a permanent move to Udinese.

== International career ==
=== Albania ===
==== Under-21 ====
He expressed his desire to play for Albania at international level. He was invited for the first time by the Albania national under-21 football team coach Skënder Gega for the Friendly match on 6 August 2014 against Qatar in Scotland, but did not appear due to a visa problem.

In October 2014, he was included in the list of players which called up by national coach Skënder Gega for the friendly match against Romania U21 on 8 October. In the match against Romania U21, Vojvoda played as a starter and the match finished in the 3–1 loss. Vojvoda was again called up to Albania U21, this time to participate in the international friendly tournament in Dubai, United Arab Emirates on 12–18 November 2014.

On 27 March 2015, Vojvoda received the Albanian citizenship to be eligible for playing with Albania U21 in competitive tournaments.

===== 2017 UEFA European Under-21 Championship =====
Vojvoda was called up for the 2017 UEFA European Under-21 Championship qualification opening match against Liechtenstein U21 on 28 March 2015. He made his competitive debut for Albania U21 against Liechtenstein U21 on 28 March 2015 playing the full 90-minutes match helping his side to win 2–0.

=== Kosovo ===
On 8 September 2016, Vojvoda decided to leave the Albania U21 in order to play for Kosovo in the future. He said that he was open for them and that he was ready to accept if there is an invitation sent to him from the Football Federation of Kosovo. On 7 November 2016, he received the call-up in a match against Turkey. On 10 November 2016, FIFA gave permission for Vojvoda to play for Kosovo. On 11 June 2017, Vojvoda made his debut for Kosovo in a 4–1 2018 FIFA World Cup qualification loss to Turkey.

== Career statistics ==
=== Club ===
As of match played 22 November 2026

Appearances and goals by club, season and competition
Club	Season	League			National cup (Note: Includes DFB-Pokal, Belgian Cup, Coppa Italia)		Continental		Other		Total	
Club	Season	Division	Apps	Goals	Apps	Goals	Apps	Goals	Apps	Goals	Apps	Goals
Sint-Truidense (loan)	2014–15	Belgian Second Division	4	0	0	0	—		—		4	0
Carl Zeiss Jena (loan)	2015–16	Regionalliga Nordost	24	0	2	0	—		1 (Note: Appearance in Thuringian Cup)	0	27	0
Mouscron	2016–17	Belgian Pro League	21	0	1	0	—		9	1	31	1
Mouscron	2017–18	Belgian Pro League	26	0	2	0	—		5	0	32	0
Mouscron	2018–19	Belgian Pro League	29	1	2	0	—		8	0	39	1
Mouscron	Total		76	1	5	0	—		22	1	103	2
Standard Liège	2019–20	Belgian Pro League	25	1	2	0	3 (Note: Appearances in UEFA Europa League)	0	—		30	1
Standard Liège	2020–21	Belgian Pro League	3	0	0	0	—		—		3	0
Standard Liège	Total		28	1	2	0	3	0	—		33	1
Torino	2020–21	Serie A	24	2	1	0	—		—		25	2
Torino	2021–22	Serie A	29	0	1	0	—		—		30	0
Torino	2022–23	Serie A	29	0	3	0	—		—		32	0
Torino	2023–24	Serie A	28	0	2	1	—		—		30	1
Torino	2024–25	Serie A	17	0	1	0	—		—		18	0
Torino	Total		127	2	8	1	—		—		135	3
Como	2024–25	Serie A	11	1	—		—		—		11	1
Como	2025–26	Serie A	30	4	4	0	—		—		34	2
Como	Total		41	3	4	0	—		—		45	3
Udinese	2026–27	Serie A	12	0	2	0	—		—		14	0
Career total			312	7	23	1	3	0	23	1	360	9

=== International ===
As of match played 17 November 2026

Appearances and goals by national team and year
National team	Year	Apps	Goals
Kosovo	2017	6	0
Kosovo	2018	9	0
Kosovo	2019	9	1
Kosovo	2020	7	0
Kosovo	2021	12	0
Kosovo	2022	2	1
Kosovo	2023	8	0
Kosovo	2024	8	0
Kosovo	2025	10	1
Kosovo	2026	10	0
Total		81	3

Scores and results list Kosovo's goal tally first, score column indicates score after each Vojvoda goal.

List of international goals scored by Mërgim Vojvoda
No.	Date	Venue	Opponent	Score	Result	Competition
1	7 September 2019	Fadil Vokrri Stadium, Pristina, Kosovo	Czech Republic	2–1	2–1	UEFA Euro 2020 qualification
2	24 March 2022	Fadil Vokrri Stadium, Pristina, Kosovo	Burkina Faso	3–0	5–0	Friendly
3	6 June 2025	Fadil Vokrri Stadium, Pristina, Kosovo	Armenia	2–2	5–2	Friendly

== Honours ==
Sint-Truidense

- Belgian Second Division: 2014–15

Carl Zeiss Jena

- Verbandspokal: 2015–16
