= Nicolas Gavory =

French footballer (born 1995)

Personal information
- Date of birth: 16 February 1995 (age 31)
- Place of birth: Beauvais, France
- Height: 1.82 m (6 ft 0 in)
- Position: Left-back

Team information
- Current team: Eupen
- Number: 5

Youth career
- 2002–2007: AS Beauvais
- 2007–2008: CO Beauvais
- 2008–2012: Auxerre

Senior career*
Years	Team	Apps	(Gls)
2012–2015	Auxerre	10	(0)
2015–2017	Béziers	59	(4)
2017–2018	Clermont	33	(0)
2018–2019	FC Utrecht	31	(1)
2019–2022	Standard Liège	71	(2)
2022–2025	Fortuna Düsseldorf	71	(2)
2023	Fortuna Düsseldorf II	3	(0)
2025–	Eupen	24	(1)

International career^{‡}
2011	France U16	1	(0)
2011	France U17	2	(0)
2013	France U19	1	(0)
- * Club domestic league appearances and goals as of 20 April 2026 ‡ National team caps and goals as of 19 June 2017

Nicolas Gavory (born 16 February 1995) is a French professional footballer who plays as a left-back for Belgian Challenger Pro League club Eupen. He is a France youth international having represented his nation at under-16, under-17 and under-19 level.

== Career ==
On 22 September 2012, Gavory made his professional debut with Auxerre appearing as a substitute in a 4–3 defeat in the Ligue 2 to Guingamp.

In May 2017 it was announced Gavory would join Ligue 2 club Clermont from Championnat National side Béziers for the 2017–18 season.

In August 2018, he joined Eredivisie side FC Utrecht from Clermont on a three-year contract with the option of a fourth year.

In June 2019, he joined Belgian club Standard Liège.

Gavory moved to 2. Bundesliga club Fortuna Düsseldorf in January 2022, having agreed a contract until summer 2025.

On 23 July 2025, Gavory returned to Belgium and signed a two-year contract with Eupen in the second tier.

== Career statistics ==
As of 28 July 2023

Appearances and goals by club, season and competition
Club	Season	League			National Cup		League Cup (deligue)		Europa League		Total	
Club	Season	Division	Apps	Goals	Apps	Goals	Apps	Goals	Apps	Goals	Apps	Goals
Auxerre	2012-13	Ligue 2	2	0	0	0	1	0	—		3	0
Auxerre	2013-14	Ligue 2	7	0			1	0	—		8	
Auxerre	2014-15	Ligue 2	1	0			1	0	—		2	0
Auxerre	Total		10	0	0	0	3	0	—		13	0
Auxerre II	2012-13	National 2	6	1	—		—		—		6	1
Auxerre II	2013-14	National 3	2	0	—		—		—		2	0
Auxerre II	2014-15	National 3	21	9	—		—		—		21	9
Béziers	2015-16	National 1	30	1	1	0	0	0	—		31	1
Béziers	2016-17	National 1	29	3	0	0	0	0	—		29	3
Béziers	Total		59	4	1	0	0	0	—		60	4
Clermont	2017-18	Ligue 2	33	0	1	0	2	1	—		36	1
FC Utrecht	2018-19	Eredivisie	35	1	3	0	—		—		38	1
Standard Liège	2019-20	First Division A	29	0	1	0	—		6	0	36	0
Standard Liège	2020-21	First Division A	37	1	2	0	—		9	1	48	2
Standard Liège	2021-22	First Division A	11	1	1	0	—		—		12	1
Standard Liège	Total		77	2	4	0	—		15	1	96	3
Fortuna Düsseldorf	2021-22	2. Bundesliga	12	0	—		—		—		12	0
Fortuna Düsseldorf	2022-23	2. Bundesliga	16	1	2	0	—		—		18	1
Fortuna Düsseldorf	2023-24	2. Bundesliga					—		—			
Fortuna Düsseldorf	Total		28	1	2	0	—		—		30	1
Fortuna Düsseldorf II	2022-23	Regionalliga West	2	0	—		—		—		2	0
Career total			273	18	11	0	5	1	15	1	304	20
