= Moussa Sissako =

Malian footballer (born 2000)

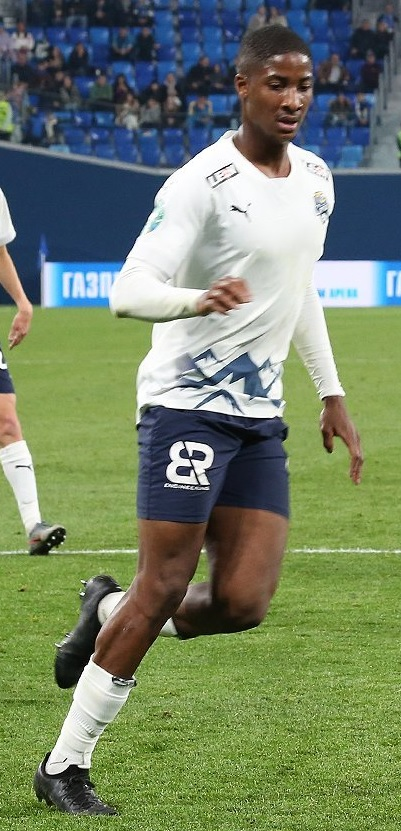
- Sissako with Sochi in 2022

Personal information
- Date of birth: 10 November 2000 (age 26)
- Place of birth: Clichy, France
- Height: 1.88 m (6 ft 2 in)
- Position: Centre-back

Team information
- Current team: IMT
- Number: 5

Youth career
- 2006–2012: RC France
- 2012–2019: Paris Saint-Germain

Senior career*
Years	Team	Apps	(Gls)
2017–2019	Paris Saint-Germain B	24	(1)
2019–2020	Paris Saint-Germain	0	(0)
2020	→ Standard Liège (loan)	0	(0)
2020–2022	Standard Liège	27	(1)
2022–2025	Sochi	10	(1)
2023–2024	→ RWD Molenbeek (loan)	16	(0)
2025–	IMT	25	(0)

International career^{‡}
2021–	Mali	4	(0)
- * Club domestic league appearances and goals as of 13 June 2026 ‡ National team caps and goals as of 3 October 2022

Moussa Sissako (born 10 November 2000) is a professional footballer who plays as a centre-back for Serbian club IMT. Born in France, he plays for the Mali national team.

== Club career ==
=== Paris Saint-Germain ===
Sissako joined Paris Saint-Germain from RC France in 2012. He signed his first professional contract on 1 June 2018, a deal that linked him with PSG until 30 June 2021. During the 2017–18 and 2018–19 seasons, Sissako played for PSG's B team, making a total of 24 appearances and scoring 1 goal.

=== Standard Liège ===
On 28 January 2020, Sissako joined Belgian club Standard Liège on a six-month loan with an option to buy. At the end of the season, the deal was made permanent for a fee of €400,000. He made his professional debut in a 4–1 Belgian Cup win over Seraing on 3 February 2021.

=== Sochi ===
On 1 September 2022, Sissako joined Russian Premier League club Sochi.

=== RWD Molenbeek ===
On 6 September 2023, Sissako joined Belgian Pro League club RWD Molenbeek on loan with an option to buy. He also signed a four-year contract with the club which will be in place in case the option to buy is exercised. On 11 February 2024, Sissako suffered a tendon tear injury that would make him unable to play from 9 to 12 months.

== International career ==
Born in France, Sissako holds French and Malian nationalities. He has regularly been called up to play with the France youth teams in the past. He was called up by the Mali U23 team for the 2019 Africa U-23 Cup of Nations, but was not capped. He debuted for the senior Mali national team in a 5–0 FIFA World Cup qualification win over Kenya on 7 October 2021.

== Style of play ==
Usually a left-sided centre-back, Sissako is versatile enough to play on both central defensive positions of a back four. He occasionally plays on the right side of a back three, and sometimes as the central defender in a back five. He is good with both of his feet. PSG youth coach François Rodrigues has described Sissako as a player that is "very aggressive on the field".

== Personal life ==
One of his brothers, Abdoulaye, is also a footballer. Souleymane, his other brother, is his adviser.

In October 2020, Sissako tested positive for COVID-19, along with several of his teammates at Standard Liège.

== Career statistics ==
As of 27 November 2023

Appearances and goals by club, season and competition
Club	Season	League			Cup		Continental		Other		Total	
Club	Season	Division	Apps	Goals	Apps	Goals	Apps	Goals	Apps	Goals	Apps	Goals
Paris Saint-Germain B	2017–18	National 2	1	0	—		—		—		1	0
Paris Saint-Germain B	2018–19	National 2	23	1	—		—		—		23	1
Paris Saint-Germain B	Total		24	1	—		—		—		24	1
Standard Liège (loan)	2019–20	First Division A	0	0	0	0	—		—		0	0
Standard Liège	2020–21	First Division A	8	0	4	0	0	0	—		12	0
Standard Liège	2021–22	First Division A	19	1	3	0	—		—		22	1
Standard Liège	Total		27	1	7	0	0	0	—		34	1
Sochi	2022–23	RPL	10	1	5	0	—		—		15	1
Career total			61	3	12	0	0	0	—		73	3

== Honours ==
Standard Liège

- Belgian Cup runner-up: 2020–21
