= Gojko Cimirot =

Bosnian footballer (born 1992)

Personal information
- Date of birth: 19 December 1992 (age 33)
- Place of birth: Trebinje, Bosnia and Herzegovina
- Height: 1.78 m (5 ft 10 in)
- Position: Defensive midfielder

Team information
- Current team: Sarajevo
- Number: 59

Youth career
- 2000–2010: Leotar

Senior career*
Years	Team	Apps	(Gls)
2010–2013	Leotar	47	(3)
2013–2015	Sarajevo	55	(0)
2015–2018	PAOK	65	(1)
2018–2023	Standard Liège	165	(2)
2023–2025	Al-Fayha	54	(0)
2025–	Sarajevo	32	(0)

International career
2012–2014	Bosnia and Herzegovina U21	7	(0)
2014–2024	Bosnia and Herzegovina	48	(0)
- * Club domestic league appearances and goals as of 22 November 2026

Gojko Cimirot (pronounced [ɡôːjko tsǐmirot]; born 19 December 1992) is a Bosnian professional footballer who plays as a defensive midfielder for Bosnian Premier League club Sarajevo.

Cimirot started his professional career at Leotar, before joining Sarajevo in 2013. Two years later, he moved to PAOK. In 2018, he was transferred to Standard Liège. Five years later, he signed with Al-Fayha. In 2025, he came back to Sarajevo.

A former youth international for Bosnia and Herzegovina, Cimirot made his senior international debut in 2014, earning over 40 caps until 2024.

== Club career ==
=== Early career ===
Cimirot came through the youth academy of his hometown club Leotar, which he joined in 2000. He made his professional debut against Široki Brijeg on 1 May 2010 at the age of 17. On 28 April 2012, he scored his first professional goal in a triumph over Čelik Zenica.

=== Sarajevo ===
In June 2013, Cimirot switched to Sarajevo on a three-year deal. On 28 July, he made his official debut for the team against Zrinjski Mostar. He won his first trophy with the club on 23 May 2014, by defeating Čelik Zenica in the Bosnian Cup final.

=== PAOK ===
In August 2015, Cimirot was transferred to Greek outfit PAOK for an undisclosed fee. He made his competitive debut for the side on 23 August against Xanthi. On 21 February 2016, he scored his first goal for PAOK against Panathinaikos.

In November, he extended his contract with the squad until June 2019.

He won his first title with the club on 6 May 2017, by triumphing over AEK Athens in the Greek Cup final.

=== Standard Liège ===
In January 2018, Cimirot moved to Belgian side Standard Liège on a deal until June 2023. On 28 January, he debuted officially for the team against Anderlecht. He won his first trophy with the club on 17 March, by beating Genk in the Belgian Cup final. On 29 April, he scored his first goal for Standard Liège in a defeat of Gent.

Cimirot played his 100th game for the squad against Beveren on 17 August 2020.

He made his 200th appearance for Standard Liège on 27 May 2023 against Cercle Brugge.

=== Later stage of career ===
In July, Cimirot signed with Saudi Arabian outfit Al-Fayha.

In August 2025, he returned to Sarajevo.

== International career ==
Cimirot was a member of the Bosnia and Herzegovina under-21 team under coach Vlado Jagodić.

In August 2014, he received his first senior call up, for a friendly game against Liechtenstein and a UEFA Euro 2016 qualifier against Cyprus. He debuted against the former on 4 September.

== Personal life ==
Cimirot married his long-time girlfriend Dajana in June 2024.

== Career statistics ==
=== Club ===
As of match played 22 November 2026

Appearances and goals by club, season and competition
Club	Season	League			National cup (Note: Includes Bosnian Cup, Greek Cup, Belgian Cup, King's Cup)		Continental		Other		Total	
Club	Season	Division	Apps	Goals	Apps	Goals	Apps	Goals	Apps	Goals	Apps	Goals
Leotar	2009–10	Bosnian Premier League	1	0	0	0	–		–		1	0
Leotar	2011–12	Bosnian Premier League	18	1	1	0	–		–		19	1
Leotar	2012–13	Bosnian Premier League	28	2	1	0	–		–		29	2
Leotar	Total		47	3	2	0	–		–		49	3
Sarajevo	2013–14	Bosnian Premier League	27	0	8	0	4 (Note: Appearance(s) in UEFA Europa League)	0	–		39	0
Sarajevo	2014–15	Bosnian Premier League	26	0	4	0	6	0	–		36	0
Sarajevo	2015–16	Bosnian Premier League	2	0	0	0	2 (Note: Appearances in UEFA Champions League)	0	–		4	0
Sarajevo	Total		55	0	12	0	12	0	–		79	0
PAOK	2015–16	Super League Greece	19	1	6	0	1	0	–		26	1
PAOK	2016–17	Super League Greece	31	0	6	0	12 (Note: Two appearances in UEFA Champions League; ten appearances in UEFA Europa League)	0	–		49	0
PAOK	2017–18	Super League Greece	15	0	4	0	4	1	–		23	1
PAOK	Total		65	1	16	0	17	1	–		98	2
Standard Liège	2017–18	Belgian Pro League	15	1	2	0	–		–		17	1
Standard Liège	2018–19	Belgian Pro League	38	0	1	0	7 (Note: Two appearances in UEFA Champions League; five appearances in UEFA Europa League)	0	–		46	0
Standard Liège	2019–20	Belgian Pro League	27	1	3	0	6	0	–		36	1
Standard Liège	2020–21	Belgian Pro League	25	0	5	0	8	0	–		38	0
Standard Liège	2021–22	Belgian Pro League	24	0	2	0	–		–		26	0
Standard Liège	2022–23	Belgian Pro League	36	0	2	0	–		–		38	0
Standard Liège	Total		165	2	15	0	21	0	–		201	2
Al-Fayha	2023–24	Saudi Pro League	29	0	1	0	3 (Note: Appearances in AFC Champions League)	0	–		33	0
Al-Fayha	2024–25	Saudi Pro League	25	0	2	0	–		–		27	0
Al-Fayha	Total		54	0	3	0	3	0	–		60	0
Sarajevo	2025–26	Bosnian Premier League	26	0	2	0	–		1 (Note: Appearance in Bosnian Supercup)	0	29	0
Sarajevo	2026–27	Bosnian Premier League	6	0	1	0	2 (Note: Appearances in UEFA Conference League)	0	–		9	0
Sarajevo	Total		32	0	3	0	2	0	1	0	38	0
Career total			417	6	51	0	55	1	1	0	524	7

=== International ===
Appearances and goals by national team and year
National team	Year	Apps	Goals
Bosnia and Herzegovina
Bosnia and Herzegovina	2014	2	0
Bosnia and Herzegovina	2015	0	0
Bosnia and Herzegovina	2016	1	0
Bosnia and Herzegovina	2017	4	0
Bosnia and Herzegovina	2018	8	0
Bosnia and Herzegovina	2019	7	0
Bosnia and Herzegovina	2020	7	0
Bosnia and Herzegovina	2021	7	0
Bosnia and Herzegovina	2022	3	0
Bosnia and Herzegovina	2023	8	0
Bosnia and Herzegovina	2024	1	0
Total		48	0

== Honours ==
Sarajevo

- Bosnian Premier League: 2014–15
- Bosnian Cup: 2013–14

PAOK

- Greek Cup: 2016–17

Standard Liège

- Belgian Cup: 2017–18
