= Samuel Bastien =

Congolese footballer (born 1996)

Personal information
- Full name: Samuel Christopher Bastien Binda
- Date of birth: 26 September 1996 (age 30)
- Place of birth: Meux, Belgium
- Height: 1.72 m (5 ft 8 in)
- Position: Midfielder

Youth career
- 2002–2006: Meux
- 2006–2009: UR Namur
- 2009–2012: Standard Liège
- 2012–2014: Anderlecht

Senior career*
| Years | Team | Apps | (Gls) |
| 2014–2016 | Anderlecht | 1 | (0) |
| 2015–2016 | → Avellino (loan) | 31 | (2) |
| 2016–2018 | Chievo Verona | 33 | (2) |
| 2018–2022 | Standard Liège | 106 | (11) |
| 2022–2024 | Burnley | 18 | (1) |
| 2023–2024 | → Kasımpaşa (loan) | 7 | (0) |
| 2024–2026 | Fortuna Sittard | 29 | (0) |

International career^{‡}
| 2014 | Belgium U19 | 2 | (0) |
| 2016–2019 | Belgium U21 | 13 | (1) |
| 2021–2022 | DR Congo | 8 | (0) |
- * Club domestic league appearances and goals as of 21 May 2026 ‡ National team caps and goals as of 20:06, 1 October 2022 (UTC)

Samuel Christopher Bastien Binda (born 26 September 1996) is a professional footballer who plays as a midfielder. Born in Belgium, he plays for the DR Congo national team.

== Club career ==
Bastien emerged from R.S.C. Anderlecht's youth system. He made his first team debut on 3 December 2014, in the Belgian Cup against K.R.C. Mechelen, replacing Youri Tielemans after 79 minutes, in a 4–1 home win.

On 31 August 2015, Bastien was loaned to Avellino. He made his debut for the Irpinian team on 12 September 2015 against Modena, replacing Mariano Arini after 53 minutes.

On 26 August 2016, Bastien signed with Serie A side A.C. ChievoVerona, who paid a €2.5 million transfer fee to Anderlecht.

On 14 June 2018, Bastien signed with Standard Liège.

On 5 July 2022, he joined Burnley, newly relegated to the EFL Championship, on a three-year contract.

On 15 September 2023, he signed for Süper Lig side Kasımpaşa on a season-long loan deal.

On 21 May 2024, Burnley said the player would be returning once the loan ended.

On 8 August 2024, Bastien moved to Fortuna Sittard in the Netherlands. His contract with Fortuna was mutually terminated on 8 July 2026.

== International career ==
Born in Belgium, Bastien is of Congolese descent. He was a youth international for Belgium. However, he decided to represent DR Congo national team. He debuted for his home country in a 2–0 2022 FIFA World Cup qualification win over Madagascar on 7 October 2021.

== Career statistics ==
=== Club ===
As of match played 21 April 2024

Appearances and goals by club, season and competition
| Club | Season | League | | | National Cup (Note: Includes Belgian Cup, Coppa Italia, FA Cup) | | League Cup (Note: Includes EFL Cup) | | Europe | | Other | | Total | |
| Club | Season | Division | Apps | Goals | Apps | Goals | Apps | Goals | Apps | Goals | Apps | Goals | Apps | Goals |
|---|---|---|---|---|---|---|---|---|---|---|---|---|---|---|
| Anderlecht | 2014–15 | Belgian Pro League | 1 | 0 | 1 | 0 | – | | 0 | 0 | 0 | 0 | 2 | 0 |
| Avellino (loan) | 2015–16 | Serie B | 31 | 2 | 0 | 0 | – | | – | | – | | 31 | 2 |
| Chievo Verona | 2016–17 | Serie A | 12 | 1 | 1 | 0 | – | | – | | – | | 13 | 1 |
| Chievo Verona | 2017–18 | Serie A | 21 | 1 | 1 | 0 | – | | – | | – | | 22 | 1 |
| Chievo Verona | Total | | 33 | 2 | 2 | 0 | – | | – | | – | | 35 | 2 |
| Standard Liège | 2018–19 | Belgian First Division A | 23 | 2 | 0 | 0 | – | | 6 (Note: Two appearances in UEFA Champions League, two appearances in UEFA Europa League) | 0 | 1 (Note: Appearance in Belgian Super Cup) | 0 | 30 | 2 |
| Standard Liège | 2019–20 | Belgian First Division A | 26 | 4 | 0 | 0 | – | | 6 (Note: Appearances in UEFA Europa League) | 1 | – | | 32 | 5 |
| Standard Liège | 2020–21 | Belgian First Division A | 29 | 4 | 5 | 0 | – | | 6 | 0 | – | | 40 | 4 |
| Standard Liège | 2021–22 | Belgian First Division A | 28 | 1 | 2 | 0 | – | | – | | – | | 30 | 1 |
| Standard Liège | Total | | 106 | 11 | 7 | 0 | – | | 18 | 1 | 1 | 0 | 132 | 12 |
| Burnley | 2022–23 | Championship | 18 | 1 | 3 | 0 | 3 | 1 | – | | – | | 24 | 2 |
| Kasımpaşa (loan) | 2023–24 | Süper Lig | 7 | 0 | 0 | 0 | – | | – | | – | | 7 | 0 |
| Career total | | | 196 | 16 | 13 | 0 | 3 | 1 | 18 | 1 | 1 | 0 | 231 | 18 |

=== International ===
As of match played on 24 September 2022.

Appearances and goals by national team and year
| National team | Year | Apps | Goals |
|---|---|---|---|
| DR Congo | 2021 | 4 | 0 |
| DR Congo | 2022 | 4 | 0 |
| Total | | 8 | 0 |

== Honours ==
Burnley

- EFL Championship: 2022–23
