= Laurent Jans =

Luxembourgish footballer (born 1992)

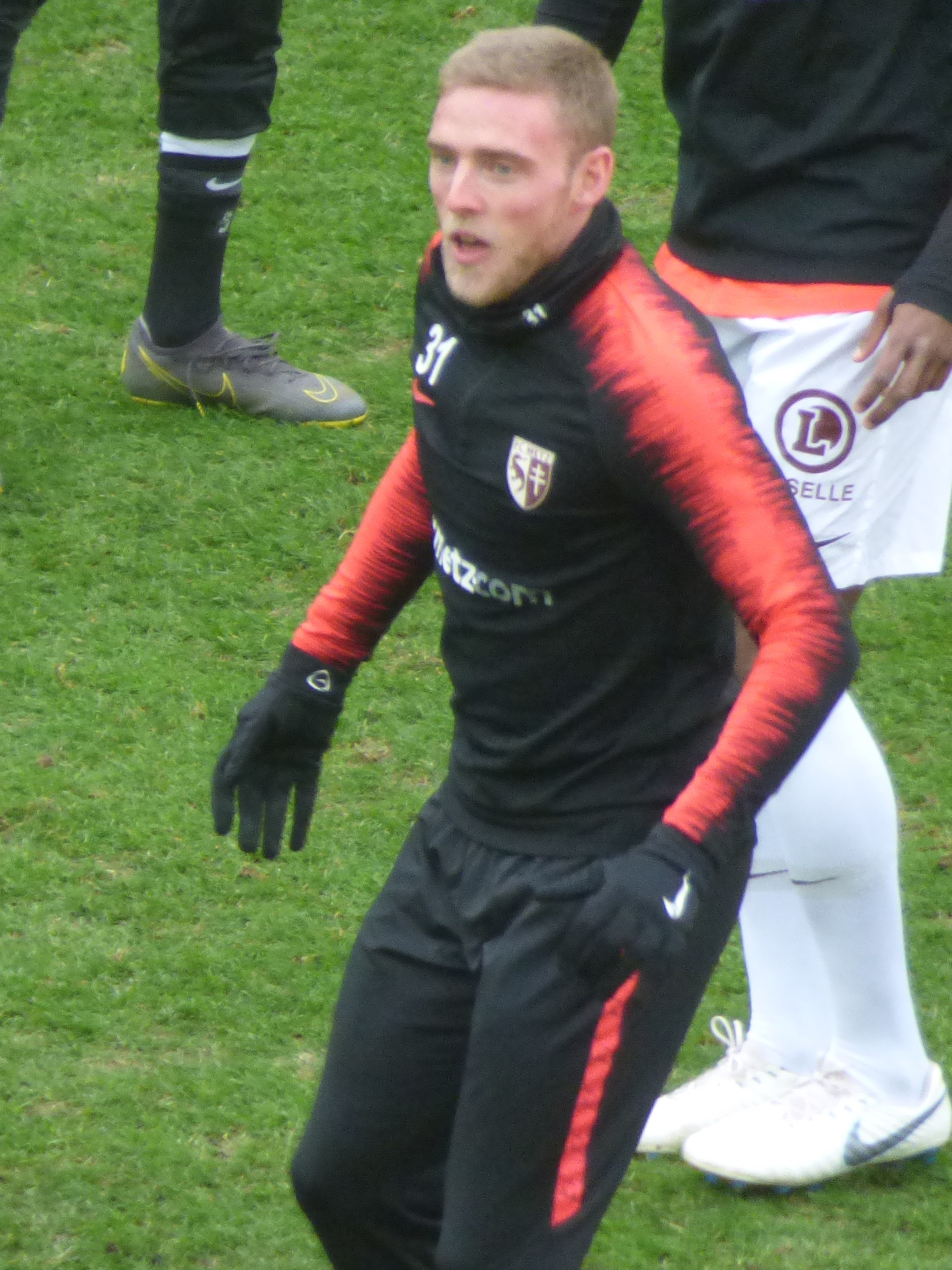
- Jans in Metz training in 2019

Personal information
- Date of birth: 5 August 1992 (age 34)
- Place of birth: Luxembourg City, Luxembourg
- Height: 1.78 m (5 ft 10 in)
- Position: Right-back

Team information
- Current team: Beveren
- Number: 21

Senior career*
Years	Team	Apps	(Gls)
2011–2015	Fola Esch	89	(1)
2015–2018	Waasland-Beveren	101	(2)
2018–2020	Metz	9	(0)
2019–2020	→ Paderborn 07 (loan)	22	(0)
2020–2021	Standard Liège	13	(0)
2021–2022	Sparta Rotterdam	19	(0)
2022–2024	Waldhof Mannheim	63	(3)
2024–	Beveren	61	(0)

International career^{‡}
2010–2011	Luxembourg U19	4	(0)
2010–2013	Luxembourg U21	6	(1)
2012–	Luxembourg	128	(1)
- * Club domestic league appearances and goals as of 19 April 2026 ‡ National team caps and goals as of 19:25, 16 November 2026 (UTC)

Laurent Jans (born 5 August 1992) is a Luxembourgish professional footballer who plays as a right-back for Beveren and the Luxembourg national team.

== Club career ==
Jans has played club football for Fola Esch and Waasland-Beveren. He went on trial with Scottish club Dundee in August 2014.

In July 2019, Jans joined SC Paderborn, newly promoted to the Bundesliga, from Metz on a season-long loan. Paderborn secured an option to sign him permanently. In May 2021 he left Belgian club Standard Liège for Dutch club Sparta Rotterdam.

On 19 August 2022, Jans moved to Waldhof Mannheim in the German 3. Liga.

In the summer of 2024, Jans signed for his former club, S.K. Beveren.

== International career ==
Jans represented Luxembourg at under-19 and under-21 youth level. He made his senior international debut for Luxembourg in 2012 in a match against Israel during the 2014 FIFA World Cup qualification. On 19 November 2023, he played his 100th international match in a 1–0 away win over Liechtenstein during the UEFA Euro 2024 qualifying.

== Career statistics ==
Scores and results list Luxembourg's goal tally first.

No.	Date	Venue	Opponent	Score	Result	Competition
1.	2 June 2019	Stade Josy Barthel, Luxembourg City, Luxembourg	Madagascar	3–3	3–3	Friendly

== See also ==
- List of men's footballers with 100 or more international caps
