= Damjan Pavlović =

Serbian footballer (born 2001)

Personal information
- Date of birth: 9 July 2001 (age 25)
- Place of birth: Eupen, Belgium
- Height: 1.79 m (5 ft 10 in)
- Position: Midfielder

Team information
- Current team: Rodez
- Number: 8

Youth career
- Eupen
- 2008–2020: Standard Liège

Senior career*
Years	Team	Apps	(Gls)
2020–2022	Standard Liège	29	(0)
2022–2024	Rijeka	6	(0)
2023	→ Degerfors (loan)	17	(1)
2024	HNK Gorica	10	(1)
2025–2026	Kauno Žalgiris	46	(1)
2026–	Rodez	0	(0)

International career^{‡}
2015–2016	Belgium U15	3	(1)
2016–2017	Belgium U16	4	(0)
2021	Serbia U20	1	(0)
2021	Serbia U21	1	(0)
- * Club domestic league appearances and goals as of 11 July 2026 ‡ National team caps and goals as of 12 November 2021

Damjan Pavlović (Serbian Cyrillic: Дамјан Павловић; born 9 July 2001) is a professional footballer who plays as a midfielder for French Ligue 2 club Rodez. Born in Belgium, he has represented Serbia at youth level.

== Career ==
Pavlović played for Swedish side Degerfors in 2023. On 28 January 2025 Lithuanian club Kauno Žalgiris announced about new player.

On 14 July 2026, Pavlović signed a three-year deal with Rodez in French Ligue 2.

== Personal life ==
Born in Belgium, Pavlovic is of Serbian descent.

== Career statistics ==
=== Club ===
As of 25 September 2020.

Appearances and goals by club, season and competition
Club	Season	League			Cup		Continental		Other		Total	
Club	Season	Division	Apps	Goals	Apps	Goals	Apps	Goals	Apps	Goals	Apps	Goals
Standard Liège	2020–21	Jupiler Pro League	1	0	0	0	0	0	0	0	1	0
Career total			1	0	0	0	0	0	0	0	1	0

== Honours ==
FK Kauno Žalgiris

- A Lyga: 2025
