= Jean-François Gillet =

Belgian footballer (born 1979)

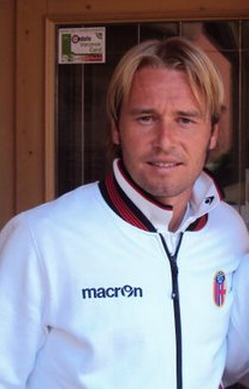
- Gillet with Bologna in 2011

Personal information
- Date of birth: 31 May 1979 (age 47)
- Place of birth: Liège, Belgium
- Height: 1.81 m (5 ft 11 in)
- Position: Goalkeeper

Team information
- Current team: Standard Liège (goalkeeping coach)

Youth career
- 1989–1996: Standard Liège

Senior career*
Years	Team	Apps	(Gls)
1996–1999	Standard Liège	6	(0)
1999–2000	Monza	37	(0)
2000–2011	Bari	353	(0)
2003–2004	→ Treviso (loan)	44	(0)
2011–2012	Bologna	29	(0)
2012–2015	Torino	49	(0)
2015–2016	Catania	16	(0)
2015–2016	→ Mechelen (loan)	28	(0)
2016–2021	Standard Liège	33	(0)
Total		595	(0)

International career
1992–1993	Belgium U15	2	(0)
1995	Belgium U16	4	(0)
1994–1995	Belgium U17	5	(0)
1995–1996	Belgium U18	19	(0)
1996	Belgium U19	1	(0)
1997	Belgium U20	4	(0)
1996–2002	Belgium U21	36	(0)
2009–2016	Belgium	9	(0)

Managerial career
- 2021–: Standard Liège (goalkeeping coach)
- * Club domestic league appearances and goals

Jean-François Gillet (born 31 May 1979) is a Belgian professional football coach and former player who played as a goalkeeper. He works as a goalkeeping coach at Standard Liège. At international level, he was a member of the Belgian squad that took part at UEFA Euro 2016.

== Club career ==
=== Standard Liège and Monza ===
He began his professional career in the youth system of Standard Liège and was called up to the first team at the age of just 17. In 1996, he made his debut in Belgian First Division and the following season he took to the field on another two occasions.

In the summer of 1999, at the age of twenty, he moved outright to Monza, then in Serie B. As a starter, he disputed 33 games.

=== Bari and Treviso ===
After playing four games in August with Monza, in the final days of the transfer market he accepted a move to Bari in Serie A, who paid 5 million lire.

His first season in the top flight, despite 20 appearances and some stand-out performances in goal, was marred by a prosecution for doping. After the match Bari-Reggina on 21 January, in fact, he became the first player in Italy to be indicted for testing positive for Nandrolone and was forced by the sports court to serve a four-month disqualification.

Over the next ten years he played 317 games for Bari in Serie A and Serie B, with the exception of a short loan with Treviso in 2003–04, due to some disagreements with the then coach Marco Tardelli.

On 13 March 2008 he renewed his contract with the Galletti until 2011.

In 2007 Antonio Conte arrived at Bari, and Gillet adapted his role in the team and was employed as a sweeper keeper. The team triumphed in Serie B, returning to the top flight after a seven-year absence.

In 2009–10, his performances were confirmed again at the highest level, only conceding seven goals in the first 12 rounds; with the defensive pairing of Andrea Ranocchia and Leonardo Bonucci, they were among the teams in Europe with the fewest goals conceded.

On 18 March 2010 he renewed with Bari until 2014, and on 12 September 2010 against Napoli, he officially became Bari's most-capped player after reaching 319 appearances for the jersey of the pugliesi, overcoming Bari legend Giovanni Loseto. For this reason, the mayor of Bari gave the Belgian goalkeeper the keys of the city as a sign of attachment to the club and the city. Gillet remained a formidable goalkeeper: saving two penalties from Francesco Totti, during the two matches between Bari and Roma, and one from Robert Acquafresca of Cagliari. At the end of the season, however, Bari were once again relegated to Serie B.

=== Bologna ===
In 2011, after Bari's relegation to Serie B, Gillet expressed his desire to finish his career in Serie A and was transferred to Bologna in a deal worth €1.4 million. At his farewell press conference, Gillet tearfully bid farewell to his adopted home in Bari and their fans. In his first season at Bologna, Gillet immediately showed his goalkeeping abilities and was quickly taken to by the Bologna faithful. His 29 league appearances in goal helped Bologna finish 9th in the 2011–12 Serie A season, the club's best finish in a decade.

=== Torino ===
On 5 July 2012 Gillet transferred to Torino for €1.7 million, with whom he signed a contract for three years. At Torino he was reunited with former coach Giampiero Ventura from Bari, making his debut on 26 August against Siena in a scoreless draw. He played 37 matches for the Granata in the 2012–13 season. However, on 6 June 2013, in the aftermath of the Bari match-fixing scandal, he was indicted for sporting fraud and on 16 July was suspended for three years and seven months due to his role in the matches Bari-Treviso on 11 May 2008; and Salernitana-Bari on 23 May 2009.

On 24 January 2014 the TNAS reduced the disqualification to 13 months (five of which he had already served). Gillet returned on 17 August 2014 in a triangular friendly in Mondovì against Bra and Virtus Mondovi. On 22 August he was recalled by Ventura for the Europa League playoff round against RNK Split. On 18 September Gillet played his first game as a starter for Torino since his suspension against the Belgian team Club Brugge, which ended 0–0 thanks to his heroic parries.

=== Catania ===
On 30 January 2015, he transferred to Catania, on a contract until 2017.

==== Loan to Mechelen ====
On 4 October 2015, Gillet saved three penalties for Mechelen in a league game against Anderlecht.

=== Standard Liège ===
On 17 March 2018, Gillet played as Standard Liège beat Genk 1–0 in extra time to win the 2018 Belgian Cup Final and qualify for the UEFA Europa League.

== International career ==
Gillet became known worldwide for conceding 10 goals against Brazil at the 1997 FIFA World Youth Championship in Malaysia, in turn helping kick-start the career of Alex de Souza.

In August 2009, at the age of 30, after a strong performance against Inter Milan for Bari, Gillet was called up to the Belgian senior team in view of qualification for the 2010 FIFA World Cup against eventual champions Spain and Armenia. He debuted on 5 September in Spain, parrying a David Villa penalty before conceding 5 goals, and then conceded twice in the next game, which saw Belgium suffer a shock 2–1 defeat.

On 14 November 2009, Gillet kept a clean sheet in a friendly against Hungary and again against Qatar.

== Style of play ==
Considered to be a talented goalkeeper in his youth, Gillet was nicknamed "the cat from Liège”, a reference to his birthplace and quick reflexes, which allowed him to compensate for his relatively modest stature for a goalkeeper of 1.81 m (5 ft 11 in); however, his size is also thought by some pundits to have limited his performances occasionally.

== Match fixing allegations ==
On 16 July 2013, Gillet received a forty-three-month ban from football following his role in suspected match fixing during his time at Bari. On appeal this ban was reduced to 13 months, with return scheduled for August 2014.

== Career statistics ==
Appearances and goals by club, season and competition
Club	Season	League			Cup		Europe		Other		Total	
Club	Season	Division	Apps	Goals	Apps	Goals	Apps	Goals	Apps	Goals	Apps	Goals
Standard Liège	1996–97	Belgian First Division	1	0	1	0	—		—		2	0
Standard Liège	1997–98	Belgian First Division	2	0	0	0	0	0	0	0	2	0
Standard Liège	1998–99	Belgian First Division	1	0	1	0	—		0	0	2	0
Standard Liège	Total		4	0	2	0	0	0	0	0	6	0
Monza	1999–2000	Serie B	33	0	2	0	—		—		35	0
Monza	2000–01	Serie B	4	0	1	0	—		—		5	0
Monza	Total		37	0	3	0	—		—		40	0
Bari	2000–01	Serie A	20	0	0	0	—		—		20	0
Bari	2001–02	Serie B	33	0	0	0	—		—		33	0
Bari	2002–03	Serie B	23	0	2	0	—		—		25	0
Bari	2004–05	Serie B	41	0	2	0	—		—		43	0
Bari	2005–06	Serie B	41	0	2	0	—		—		43	0
Bari	2006–07	Serie B	42	0	1	0	—		—		43	0
Bari	2007–08	Serie B	40	0	1	0	—		—		41	0
Bari	2008–09	Serie B	40	0	2	0	—		—		42	0
Bari	2009–10	Serie A	37	0	1	0	—		—		38	0
Bari	2010–11	Serie A	36	0	0	0	—		—		36	0
Bari	Total		353	0	11	0	—		—		364	0
Treviso (loan)	2003–04	Serie B	44	0	0	0	—		—		44	0
Bologna	2011–12	Serie A	29	0	1	0	—		—		30	0
Torino	2012–13	Serie A	37	0	1	0	—		—		38	0
Torino	2014–15	Serie A	12	0	0	0	2	0	—		14	0
Torino	Total		49	0	1	0	2	0	—		52	0
Catania	2014–15	Serie B	16	0	—		—		—		16	0
Mechelen (loan)	2015–16	Belgian Pro League	30	0	5	0	—		3	0	38	0
Standard Liège	2016–17	Belgian First Division A	20	0	1	0	3	0	9	0	33	0
Standard Liège	2017–18	Belgian First Division A	1	0	6	0	—		1	0	8	0
Standard Liège	2018–19	Belgian First Division A	0	0	1	0	0	0	1	0	2	0
Standard Liège	2019–20	Belgian First Division A	0	0	0	0	0	0	—		0	0
Standard Liège	2020–21	Belgian First Division A	0	0	0	0	0	0	3	0	3	0
Standard Liège	Total		21	0	8	0	3	0	14	0	46	0
Career total			583	0	31	0	5	0	17	0	636	0

=== International ===
Appearances and goals by national team and year
National team	Year	Apps	Goals
Belgium	2009	4	0
Belgium	2010	2	0
Belgium	2011	1	0
Belgium	2012	1	0
Belgium	2013	1	0
Belgium	2014	0	0
Belgium	2015	0	0
Belgium	2016	0	0
Total		9	0

== Honours ==
Standard Liège

- Belgian Cup: 2017–18

Individual

- AC Monza Hall of Fame: 2021
