= Belgium national under-18 football team =

Belgium Under-18
- Nickname: Little Red Devils
- Association: Royal Belgian Football Association
- Confederation: UEFA (Europe)
- Head coach: Wesley Sonck
- Captain: Frederik Spruyt
- Most caps: Jean-Francois Gillet (19)
- Top scorer: Émile Mpenza (6)
- FIFA code: BEL
First colours	Second colours

FIFA ranking
- Current: 10

The Belgium national under-18 football team is a feeder team for the main Belgium national football team.

The team plays an annual friendly tournament. In addition, it only plays practice matches. The team mainly intends to prepare players from Belgium Under 17 for Belgium Under 19.

From 1948 to 2001, an annual European Under-18 Championship was played. In 1977, Belgium won the tournament. In 2002, the tournament was transformed into a European Under-19 football championship.
