= 2020–21 Royal Excel Mouscron season =

Royal Excel Mouscron
2020–21 season
- Owner: Latimer International Limited
- Chairman: Patrick Declerck
- Manager: Bernd Hollerbach
- Stadium: Stade Le Canonnier
- Belgian First Division A: 18th (relegated)
- Belgian Cup: Sixth round
Home colours	Away colours	Third colours
- All statistics correct as of 18 April 2021.

The 2020–21 Royal Excel Mouscron season was the club's 99th season in existence and its seventh consecutive season in the top flight of Belgian football. In addition to the domestic league, Excel Mouscron participated in this season's edition of the Belgian Cup. The season covered the period from 1 July 2020 to 30 June 2021.

== Players ==
=== First-team squad ===
As of 24 August 2020

Note: Flags indicate national team as defined under FIFA eligibility rules; some limited exceptions apply. Players may hold more than one non-FIFA nationality.

No.	Pos.	Nation	Player
2	DF	CIV	Kouadio-Yves Dabila (on loan from Lille)
5	DF	MAR	Saad Agouzoul (on loan from Lille)
6	MF	MNE	Deni Hočko
7	MF	CMR	Fabrice Olinga
8	MF	CMR	Jean Onana (on loan from Lille)
9	FW	MDA	Virgiliu Postolachi (on loan from Lille)
10	MF	MNE	Marko Bakić
11	MF	FRA	Dimitri Mohamed (captain)
13	DF	BEL	Alessandro Ciranni
14	FW	FRA	Imad Faraj (on loan from Lille)
15	MF	ANG	Capita (on loan from Lille)
16	GK	BFA	Hervé Koffi (on loan from Lille)
18	DF	BEL	Robbe Quirynen (on loan from Antwerp)
20	FW	CPV	Nuno da Costa (on loan from Nottingham Forest)

No.	Pos.	Nation	Player
21	GK	BEL	Nick Gillekens
22	DF	FRA	Eric Bocat (on loan from Lille)
23	MF	POR	Xadas (on loan from Braga)
26	DF	ARG	Matías Silvestre
28	MF	BEL	Enes Sağlık
29	FW	BEL	Beni Badibanga
30	MF	BEL	Benjamin Van Durmen
31	FW	FRA	Harlem Gnohéré
33	FW	CAN	Charles-Andreas Brym (on loan from Lille)
39	MF	FRA	Darly N'Landu (on loan from Lille)
45	MF	ALB	Agim Zeka
47	DF	SEN	El Hadji Gueye (on loan from Lille)
70	FW	CMR	Serge Tabekou
90	GK	SRB	Vaso Vasić

== Pre-season and friendlies ==
Win Draw Loss

4 July 2020 Friendly	Excel Mouscron (Belgium)	4–1	(Belgium) Royal Dottignies Sport	Mouscron, Belgium
11:00 CEST (UTC+2)				Stadium: Stade Le Canonnier

15 July 2020 Friendly	Reims (France)	Cancelled	(Belgium) Excel Mouscron	Le Touquet, France
17:00 CEST (UTC+2)				Stadium: Stade Ferdi Petit

18 July 2020 Friendly	Excel Mouscron (Belgium)	1–2	(France) Lille	Mouscron, Belgium
17:00 CEST (UTC+2)	Cedric 79'		Xeka 3' (pen.); Simbakoli 76'	Stadium: Stade Le Canonnier

24 July 2020 Friendly	Valenciennes (France)	0–1	(Belgium) Excel Mouscron	Famars, France
16:00 CEST (UTC+2)				Stadium: Stade Centre Formation VAFC N° 2 Attendance: 0

1 August 2020 Friendly	Excel Mouscron (Belgium)	0–2	(Belgium) Union Saint-Gilloise	Mouscron, Belgium
16:00 CEST (UTC+2)				Stadium: Stade Le Canonnier

== Competitions ==
=== Overview ===
Competition	First match	Last match	Starting round	Final position	Record							
Competition	First match	Last match	Starting round	Final position	Pld	W	D	L	GF	GA	GD	Win %
Belgian First Division A	8 August 2020	18 April 2021	Matchday 1	18th	34	7	10	17	32	54	−22	20.59
Belgian Cup	2 February 2021		Sixth round	Sixth round	1	0	0	1	1	2	−1	0.00
Total					35	7	10	18	33	56	−23	20.00

Source: Soccerway

=== Belgian First Division A ===
==== League table ====
Pos	Team	Pld	W	D	L	GF	GA	GD	Pts	Qualification or relegation
14	Kortrijk	34	11	6	17	44	57	−13	39	
15	Sint-Truiden	34	10	8	16	41	52	−11	38	
16	Cercle Brugge	34	11	3	20	40	51	−11	36	
17	Waasland-Beveren (R)	34	8	7	19	44	70	−26	31	Qualification for the Relegation play-off
18	Excel Mouscron (Note: On 14 April 2021 news was released that both Excel Mouscron and Oostende had not received a Belgian professional football license for the coming season, a requirement to play at the top two levels of Belgian football. For Oostende, a lack of financial transparency, together with generally poor quality and incompleteness of the submitted report, was given as the main reason by the committee for not awarding a license, while Excel Mouscron was refused a license as besides insufficient transparency, the committee also questioned several cash flows and whether the club was creditworthy in general, also due to the fact that the wages for the months of February and March had not yet been paid at that point. For Excel Mouscron, it was already the sixth year running the license was (initially) refused, however, the club has appealed the decision with the Belgian Court for Sports Arbitrage (BAS) successfully on each occasion and intended to do so again. Oostende was planning to launch an appeal as well, with the BAS to rule on the matter for both clubs before the 10th of May. Both clubs were allowed to add new documents to their case, but in case they however still did not receive a license after appeal, knew they would have been forced to relegate to the 2021–22 Belgian Division 2 and start the season with a 3-point penalty. Both Excel Mouscron and Oostende were however eventually awarded a license after appeal, meaning Oostende remained at the top level, while Excel Mouscron only dropped one level.) (R)	34	7	10	17	32	54	−22	31	Relegation to First Division B

Source: Jupiler Pro League (in Dutch), Soccerway
Rules for classification: 1) Points; 2) Matches won; 3) Goal difference; 4) Goals scored; 5) Away matches won; 6) Away goal difference; 7) Away goals scored; 8) Play-off.
(R) Relegated

==== Results summary ====
Overall								Home						Away					
Pld	W	D	L	GF	GA	GD	Pts	W	D	L	GF	GA	GD	W	D	L	GF	GA	GD
34	7	10	17	32	54	−22	31	4	5	8	17	22	−5	3	5	9	15	32	−17

Source: Jupiler Pro League

==== Results by round ====
Round	1	2	3	4	5	6	7	8	9	10	11	12	13	14	15	16	17	18	19	20	21	22	23	24	25	26	27	28	29	30	31	32	33	34
Ground	A	H	A	H	A	H	H	A	H	A	H	A	A	H	A	H	H	A	A	A	H	H	A	H	A	H	A	H	A	H	H	A	H	A
Result	D	L	D	L	L	L	D	L	L	W	W	L	L	D	L	W	D	W	L	L	W	D	W	D	D	L	L	L	D	W	L	D	L	L
Position	10	14	14	18	18	18	17	18	18	18	18	18	18	17	18	17	17	16	17	17	16	16	16	16	16	16	16	17	17	16	17	17	17	18

Source: Jupiler Pro League
A = Away; H = Home; W = Win; D = Draw; L = Loss

==== Matches ====
The league fixtures were announced on 8 July 2020.

8 August 2020 1	Antwerp	1–1	Excel Mouscron	Antwerp
19:00 CEST (UTC+2)	Refaelov 49' (pen.); Buta (yellow card) 58'; De Laet (yellow card) 77'	Report	Onana (yellow card) 48'; Bakić 78'	Stadium: Bosuilstadion; Attendance: 0 Referee: Nathan Verboomen

14 August 2020 2	Excel Mouscron	0–1	KV Mechelen	Mouscron
19:00 CEST (UTC+2)	Antonov (yellow card) 8'; Koffi (yellow card) 8'; Bakić (yellow card) 48'	Report	Storm 9' (pen.); Van Damme (yellow card) 47'; Bushiri (yellow card) 48'; Coucke (yellow card) 86'	Stadium: Stade Le Canonnier; Attendance: 0 Referee: Christof Dierick

23 August 2020 3	Anderlecht	1–1	Excel Mouscron	Anderlecht
18:15 CEST (UTC+2)	Žulj (yellow card) 24'; Dimata 63' (pen.); Trebel (yellow card) 70'	Report	Bocat (yellow card) 11' (yellow-red card) 39'; Gnohéré 90+3'	Stadium: Constant Vanden Stock Stadium; Attendance: 0 Referee: Wim Smet

29 August 2020 4	Excel Mouscron	0–1	Zulte Waregem	Mouscron
20:45 CEST (UTC+2)	Hočko (yellow card) 33'; Ciranni (yellow card) 58'	Report	Deschacht (yellow card) 70'; Seck 73'	Stadium: Stade Le Canonnier; Attendance: 0 Referee: Jasper Vergoote

13 September 2020 5	Kortrijk	3–0	Excel Mouscron	Kortrijk
20:45 CEST (UTC+2)	Ocansey (yellow card) 50', (goal) 83'; Mboyo (yellow card) 52', (goal) 59'; Dewaele 63'	Report	Onana (red card) 32'; Hočko (yellow card) 67' (yellow-red card) 85'	Stadium: Guldensporen Stadion; Attendance: 3,725; Referee: Kevin Van Damme

19 September 2020 6	Excel Mouscron	0–1	Gent	Mouscron
18:30 CEST (UTC+2)	Agouzoul (yellow card) 24'; Ciranni (yellow card) 81'; Nlandu (yellow card) 85'	Report	Dorsch 14'	Stadium: Stade Le Canonnier; Attendance: 900; Referee: Bert Put

27 September 2020 7	Excel Mouscron	1–1	Charleroi	Mouscron
20:45 CEST (UTC+2)	Tabekou 45+2'; Ciranni (yellow card) 78'; Hočko (yellow card) 89'	Report	Fall 30'; Kayembe (yellow card) 68'	Stadium: Stade Le Canonnier; Attendance: 1,000; Referee: Bram Van Driessche

4 October 2020 8	Oostende	3–0	Excel Mouscron	Ostend
20:45 CEST (UTC+2)	Theate 60'; Sakala 81'; McGeehan 90+3', (yellow card) 90+4'	Report		Stadium: Versluys Arena; Attendance: 2,112; Referee: Kevin Van Damme

18 October 2020 9	Excel Mouscron	0–2	Eupen	Mouscron
16:00 CEST (UTC+2)		Report	Musona 47'; Heris 79'	Stadium: Stade Le Canonnier; Attendance: 500; Referee: Wesli De Cremer

22 November 2020 13	Genk	4–1	Excel Mouscron	Genk
20:45 CET (UTC+1)	Onuachu (yellow card) 39', (goal) 63'; Ito 45+2'; Bongonda 55', 81'	Report	Bakić (yellow card) 17'; Da Costa 34', (yellow card) 79'; Ciranni (yellow card) 38'; Badibanga (yellow card) 80'	Stadium: Luminus Arena; Attendance: 0 Referee: Nicolas Laforge

25 November 2020 10	Cercle Brugge	1–2	Excel Mouscron	Bruges
17:00 CET (UTC+1)	Vitinho (yellow card) 25'; Biancone (yellow card) 27'; Musaba 64'; Lopes (yellow card) 86'; Hoggas (yellow card) 90+9'	Report	Bocat (yellow card) 20'; Onana (yellow card) 30'; Silvestre 81'; Gnohéré 87' (pen.)	Stadium: Jan Breydel Stadium; Attendance: 0 Referee: Jan Boterberg

28 November 2020 14	Excel Mouscron	0–0	Club Brugge	Mouscron
20:45 CET (UTC+1)	Capita (yellow card) 76'; Mohamed (yellow card) 82'	Report	Dennis (yellow card) 87'; Balanta (yellow card) 87'; Mata (yellow card) 90+4'	Stadium: Stade Le Canonnier; Attendance: 0 Referee: Wesli De Cremer

1 December 2020 11	Excel Mouscron	3–2	Sint-Truiden	Mouscron
17:00 CET (UTC+1)	Bakić (yellow card) 17', (goal) 18'; Koffi (yellow card) 34'; Da Costa 53'; Faraj 81'; Xadas (yellow card) 90+5'	Report	Sankhon (yellow card) 17'; García (yellow card) 37'; Suzuki 63' (pen.); Nakamura 90+1'; Janssens (yellow card) 90+2'	Stadium: Stade Le Canonnier; Attendance: 0 Referee: Christof Dierick

5 December 2020 15	Waasland-Beveren	2–0	Excel Mouscron	Beveren
16:15 CET (UTC+1)	Koita 57'; Frey (yellow card) 89', (goal) 90+2'	Report	Onana (yellow card) 35'; Da Costa (yellow card) 67'	Stadium: Freethiel Stadion; Attendance: 0 Referee: Lawrence Visser

8 December 2020 12	OH Leuven	2–0	Excel Mouscron	Leuven
18:30 CET (UTC+1)	Ngawa 56'; Henry 84'	Report	Olinga (yellow card) 29'; Agouzoul (yellow card) 40'; Onana (yellow card) 42'; Bakić (yellow card) 77'; Brym (yellow card) 87'	Stadium: Den Dreef; Attendance: 0 Referee: Wesley Alen

12 December 2020 16	Excel Mouscron	3–1	Beerschot	Mouscron
16:15 CET (UTC+1)				Stadium: Stade Le Canonnier

15 December 2020 17	Excel Mouscron	2–2	OH Leuven	Mouscron
18:45 CET (UTC+1)	Sowah (yellow card) 30'; Vlietinck 42'; Hubert 55' (pen.); Vekemans (yellow card) 74'	Report	Ciranni (yellow card) 29'; Agouzoul (yellow card) 30'; Koffi (yellow card) 54'; Olinga (yellow card) 59'; Da Costa 71', 77'; Tabekou (yellow card) 90+2'	Stadium: Stade Le Canonnier; Attendance: 0 Referee: Erik Lambrechts

20 December 2020 18	Standard Liège	0–1	Excel Mouscron	Liège
18:15 CET (UTC+1)	Jans (yellow card) 9'; Bokadi (yellow card) 72'; Amallah (yellow card) 77'; Carcela (yellow card) 78'	Report	Xadas 30'; Hočko (yellow card) 34'	Stadium: Stade Maurice Dufrasne; Attendance: 0 Referee: Nicolas Laforge

27 December 2020 19	KV Mechelen	2–1	Excel Mouscron	Mechelen
20:45 CET (UTC+1)	Mrabti 38'; Shved 83'	Report	Mohamed 69' (pen.)	Stadium: Achter de Kazerne; Attendance: 0 Referee: Jasper Vergoote

9 January 2021 20	Zulte Waregem	1–0	Excel Mouscron	Waregem
16:15 CET (UTC+1)		Report		Stadium: Regenboogstadion; Attendance: 0 Referee: Jonathan Lardot

16 January 2021 21	Excel Mouscron	2–0	Genk	Mouscron
18:30 CET (UTC+1)	Olinga 29'; Tabekou 71'	Report		Stadium: Stade Le Canonnier; Attendance: 0 Referee: Jasper Vergoote

19 January 2021 22	Excel Mouscron	1–1	Waasland-Beveren	Mouscron
18:45 CET (UTC+1)		Report		Stadium: Stade Le Canonnier; Attendance: 0 Referee: Jan Boterberg

23 January 2021 23	Sint-Truiden	0–2	Excel Mouscron	Sint-Truiden
18:30 CET (UTC+1)		Report		Stadium: Stayen; Attendance: 0 Referee: Erik Lambrechts

26 January 2021 24	Excel Mouscron	1–1	Anderlecht	Mouscron
21:00 CET (UTC+1)				Stadium: Stade Le Canonnier; Attendance: 0

30 January 2021 25	Eupen	1–1	Excel Mouscron	Eupen
18:30 CET (UTC+1)				Stadium: Kehrwegstadion; Attendance: 0

5 February 2021 26	Excel Mouscron	0–3	Kortrijk	Mouscron
20:45 CET (UTC+1)				Stadium: Stade Le Canonnier; Attendance: 0

15 February 2021 27	Gent	4–0	Excel Mouscron	Ghent
20:45 CET (UTC+1)	Yaremchuk 28', 85', 90+1'; Tissoudali 70'; Owusu (yellow card) 89'	Report	Agouzoul (yellow card) 65'	Stadium: Ghelamco Arena; Attendance: 0 Referee: Kevin Van Damme

20 February 2021 28	Excel Mouscron	1–2	Cercle Brugge	Mouscron
18:30 CET (UTC+1)	Mohamed (yellow card) 20'; Bakić (yellow card) 28'; Tabekou (yellow card) 45+1'; Onana (yellow card) 67'; Lepoint 90+1'	Report	Ugbo 13'; Pavlović (yellow card) 78'; Denkey 88'; Didillon (yellow card) 90+5'	Stadium: Stade Le Canonnier; Attendance: 0 Referee: Jonathan Lardot

28 February 2021 29	Beerschot	2–2	Excel Mouscron	Antwerp
16:00 CET (UTC+1)	Pietermaat (yellow card) 80'; Eleke 86'; Radić 90+4'; Van den Bergh (yellow card) 90+6'	Report	Olinga (yellow card) 23'; Onana 26'; Da Costa (yellow card) 45+3'; Tabekou 71'; Koffi (yellow card) 85'; Hočko (yellow card) 90+6'; Bakić (yellow card) 90+7'	Stadium: Olympisch Stadion; Attendance: 0 Referee: Jasper Vergoote

7 March 2021 30	Excel Mouscron	1–0	Standard Liège	Mouscron
13:30 CET (UTC+1)	Siquet 37' (o.g.); Olinga (yellow card) 73'; Bakić (yellow card) 90+1'	Report	Laifis (yellow card) 90+5'	Stadium: Stade Le Canonnier; Attendance: 0 Referee: Wesli De Cremer

20 March 2021 31	Excel Mouscron	0–1	Oostende	Mouscron
18:30 CET (UTC+1)	Hočko (yellow card) 45+3'	Report	D'Arpino (yellow card) 57'; Gueye 90+2'	Stadium: Stade Le Canonnier; Attendance: 0 Referee: Bert Put

4 April 2021 32	Charleroi	1–1	Excel Mouscron	Charleroi
20:45 CEST (UTC+2)	Botaka (yellow card) 9'; Fall 88'	Report	Quirynen (yellow card) 21'; Lepoint (yellow card) 58'; Hočko (yellow card) 76'; Da Costa 85'	Stadium: Stade du Pays de Charleroi; Attendance: 0 Referee: Christof Dierick

12 April 2021 33	Excel Mouscron	2–3	Antwerp	Mouscron
20:45 CEST (UTC+2)	Olinga (yellow card) 38', (goal) 49'; Da Costa (yellow card) 81'; Agouzoul (yellow card) 83'; Harbaoui 88'	Report	Mbokani 22', 48'; Le Marchand (red card) 41'; Seck 62'; De Wolf (yellow card) 78'	Stadium: Stade Le Canonnier; Attendance: 0 Referee: Jan Boterberg

18 April 2021 34	Club Brugge	4–2	Excel Mouscron	Bruges
18:00 CEST (UTC+2)	Mata (yellow card) 9'; De Ketelaere 55'; Vanaken 64'; Lang 85'; Dost 89'	Report	Harbaoui (yellow card) 47', (goal) 51'; Silvestre 72'	Stadium: Jan Breydel Stadium; Attendance: 0 Referee: Jonathan Lardot

=== Belgian Cup ===
2 February 2021 Sixth round	Union SG	2–1	Excel Mouscron	Forest
18:00 CET (UTC+1)	Mehlem (red card) 64'; Vanzeir 79'; Teuma (yellow card) 84'; Nielsen 90+2'	Report	Bakić 30'; Gueye (yellow card) 59'; Onana (yellow card) 59'	Stadium: Stade Joseph Marien; Attendance: 0

== Statistics ==
=== Goalscorers ===
As of 14 August 2020

Rank	No.	Pos	Nat	Name	Pro League	Belgian Cup	Total
1	10	MF	(Montenegro)	Marko Bakić	1	0	1
Totals					1	0	1
