= 2019–20 Standard Liège season =

Standard Liège
2019–20 season
- Chairman: Bruno Venanzi
- Manager: Michel Preud'homme
- Stadium: Stade Maurice Dufrasne
- Belgian First Division A: 5th
- Belgian Cup: Quarter-finals
- UEFA Europa League: Group stage
- Top goalscorer: League: Selim Amallah; Renaud Emond; Maxime Lestienne (7 each); All: Maxime Lestienne (10)
Home colours	Away colours	Third colours

The 2019–20 season was Standard Liège's 116th season in existence and the club's 8th consecutive season in the top flight of Belgian football. In addition to the domestic league, Standard Liège participated in this season's editions of the Belgian Cup and the UEFA Europa League. The season covered the period from 1 July 2019 to 30 June 2020.

== Players ==
=== Current squad ===
As of 8 January 2020

Note: Flags indicate national team as defined under FIFA eligibility rules; some limited exceptions apply. Players may hold more than one non-FIFA nationality.

No.	Pos.	Nation	Player
1	GK	BEL	Jean-François Gillet
2	MF	HAI	Réginal Goreux
3	DF	BEL	Zinho Vanheusden
4	DF	BEL	Dimitri Lavalée
7	FW	CRO	Duje Čop
8	MF	BIH	Gojko Cimirot
10	MF	MAR	Mehdi Carcela
12	FW	ROU	Denis Drăguș
15	MF	ISR	Eden Shamir
16	GK	BEL	Arnaud Bodart
17	FW	BEL	Obbi Oularé
18	MF	MNE	Aleksandar Boljević
19	MF	MAR	Selim Amallah
20	MF	COD	Merveille Bokadi
21	DF	CMR	Collins Fai

No.	Pos.	Nation	Player
22	MF	BEL	Maxime Lestienne
23	DF	BEL	Senna Miangue (on loan from Cagliari)
24	DF	FRA	Nicolas Gavory
25	FW	URU	Felipe Avenatti
26	MF	BEL	Nicolas Raskin
27	DF	KOS	Mërgim Vojvoda
28	MF	BEL	Samuel Bastien
29	DF	BEL	Luis Pedro Cavanda
30	GK	SRB	Vanja Milinković-Savić (on loan from Torino)
32	MF	BEL	Joachim Carcela
33	GK	BEL	Timothy Galje
34	DF	CYP	Konstantinos Laifis
36	DF	BEL	Noë Dussenne
37	DF	MLI	Hady Sangaré
40	MF	COD	Paul-José M'Poku

=== Out of first team ===
Note: Flags indicate national team as defined under FIFA eligibility rules; some limited exceptions apply. Players may hold more than one non-FIFA nationality.

No.	Pos.	Nation	Player
—	FW	POR	Orlando Sá

=== Out on loan ===
Note: Flags indicate national team as defined under FIFA eligibility rules; some limited exceptions apply. Players may hold more than one non-FIFA nationality.

No.	Pos.	Nation	Player
11	FW	BRA	Carlinhos (at Vitória de Setúbal until 30 June 2020)
12	MF	COD	William Balikwisha (at Cercle Brugge until 30 June 2020)

== Competitions ==
Win Draw Loss Fixtures

=== Overview ===
Competition	First match	Last match	Starting round	Final position	Record							
Competition	First match	Last match	Starting round	Final position	Pld	W	D	L	GF	GA	GD	Win %
Belgian Division	27 July 2019	7 March 2020	Matchday 1	5th	29	14	7	8	47	32	+15	48.28
Belgian Cup	26 September 2019	18 December 2019	Sixth round	Quarter-finals	3	2	0	1	6	4	+2	66.67
Europa League	19 September 2019	12 December 2019	Group stage	Group stage	6	2	2	2	8	10	−2	33.33
Total					38	18	9	11	61	46	+15	47.37

Last updated: 7 March 2020
Source: Soccerway

=== Belgian Division ===
==== League table ====
Pos	Team	Pld	W	D	L	GF	GA	GD	Pts	Qualification or relegation
3	Charleroi	29	15	9	5	49	23	+26	54	Qualification for the Europa League third qualifying round
4	Antwerp (Y)	29	15	8	6	49	32	+17	53	Qualification for the Europa League group stage (Note: Antwerp qualified for the Europa League group stage as the 2019–20 Belgian Cup winners.)
5	Standard Liège	29	14	7	8	47	32	+15	49	Qualification for the Europa League second qualifying round
6	Mechelen	29	13	5	11	46	43	+3	44	
7	Genk	29	13	5	11	45	42	+3	44	

Source: Belgian First Division A (in Dutch), Soccerway
Rules for classification: 1) Points; 2) Matches won; 3) Goal difference; 4) Goals scored; 5) Away goals scored; 6) Away matches won; 7) Play-off.
(Y) Croky Cup winner

==== Results summary ====
Overall								Home						Away					
Pld	W	D	L	GF	GA	GD	Pts	W	D	L	GF	GA	GD	W	D	L	GF	GA	GD
29	14	7	8	47	32	+15	49	9	4	2	24	9	+15	5	3	6	23	23	0

Last updated: 7 March 2020.

==== Results by round ====
Matchday	1	2	3	4	5	6	7	8	9	10	11	12	13	14	15	16	17	18	19	20	21	22	23	24	25	26	27	28	29	30
Ground	A	H	A	H	H	A	A	H	H	A	H	A	H	A	H	A	H	A	H	A	H	A	H	A	H	A	H	A	H	A
Result	W	W	L	W	W	L	W	W	D	D	W	D	W	L	L	W	W	D	D	L	L	W	W	L	D	W	W	L	D	C
Position	4	3	5	3	1	1	1	1	2	2	2	2	2	2	3	2	2	3	4	5	5	5	4	5	5	4	4	5	5	5

Updated to match(es) played on 7 March 2020. Source: Jupiler Pro League
A = Away; H = Home; W = Win; D = Draw; L = Loss

==== Matches ====
On 2 April 2020, the Jupiler Pro League's board of directors proposed to cancel the season due to the COVID-19 pandemic. The General Assembly accepted the proposal on 15 May, and officially ended the 2019–20 season.

27 July 2019 1	Cercle Brugge	0–2	Standard Liège	Bruges
18:00 CEST (UTC+2)	Serrano (yellow card) 85' (yellow-red card) 90+2'	Report	Bastien (yellow card) 30'; Emond 88'; Limbombe 90+4'	Stadium: Jan Breydel Stadium; Attendance: 4,311; Referee: Alexandre Boucaut

3 August 2019 2	Standard Liège	4–0	Zulte Waregem	Liège
18:00 CEST (UTC+2)	Walsh 2' (o.g.); Lestienne 45+1'; Emond 69', 75'	Report	Bjørdal (yellow card) 44'; Deschacht (red card) 46'; Bruno (yellow card) 72'	Stadium: Stade Maurice Dufrasne; Attendance: 25,778; Referee: Nathan Verboomen

11 August 2019 3	Sint-Truiden	2–1	Standard Liège	Sint-Truiden
14:30 CEST (UTC+2)	De Bruyn 29'; Massoudi 37'; Janssens (yellow card) 54'; De Smet (yellow card) 59'; Teixeira (yellow card) 67'; Schmidt (yellow card) 84'	Report	Lestienne (yellow card) 9'; Vojvoda (yellow card) 23'; M'Poku 58'; Carcela (yellow card) 90+6'	Stadium: Stayen; Attendance: 10,000; Referee: Jonathan Lardot

18 August 2019 4	Standard Liège	4–1	Mouscron	Liège
14:30 CEST (UTC+2)	Lestienne 13', 22'; Amallah 46'; Emond 88'	Report	Laifis 50' (o.g.); de Medina (yellow card) 55'	Stadium: Stade Maurice Dufrasne; Attendance: 25,622; Referee: Nicolas Laforge

25 August 2019 5	Standard Liège	2–1	Kortrijk	Liège
18:00 CEST (UTC+2)	Lestienne (yellow card) 23' (yellow-red card) 90+2'; Laifis 82'; Amallah 89'	Report	Golubović (yellow card) 27'; Ocansey 34'; Mboyo (yellow card) 54'; D'Haene (yellow card) 65'	Stadium: Stade Maurice Dufrasne; Attendance: 26,282; Referee: Alexandre Boucaut

1 September 2019 6	Anderlecht	1–0	Standard Liège	Anderlecht
18:00 CEST (UTC+2)	Saelemaekers 31', (yellow card) 53'; Dewaele (yellow card) 71'	Report	Carcela (yellow card) 87'; M'Poku (yellow card) 90+4'	Stadium: Constant Vanden Stock Stadium; Attendance: 19,500; Referee: Nicolas Laforge

14 September 2019 7	Oostende	1–4	Standard Liège	Ostend
18:00 CEST (UTC+2)	Sakala 31'	Report	Lestienne 21', 67'; Limbombe (yellow card) 35'; Fai (yellow card) 40'; Bastien 54'; Cimirot 80'	Stadium: Versluys Arena; Attendance: 5,242; Referee: Lothar D'hondt

22 September 2019 8	Standard Liège	3–0	Eupen	Liège
14:30 CEST (UTC+2)	Laifis 6'; Boljević 27', 61'	Report	Amat (yellow card) 37' (yellow-red card) 83'; Beck (yellow card) 65'; Bolingi (yellow card) 83'	Stadium: Stade Maurice Dufrasne; Attendance: 25,204; Referee: Wesley Alen

29 September 2019 9	Standard Liège	1–1	Sporting Charleroi	Liège
20:00 CEST (UTC+2)	Carcela (yellow card) 59'; Amallah (yellow card) 85'; M'Poku 90'	Report	Diagne (yellow card) 2'; Ilaimaharitra (yellow card) 31' (yellow-red card) 90+3'; Morioka 45+1'; Fortuna (yellow card) 63'	Stadium: Stade Maurice Dufrasne; Attendance: 26,932; Referee: Bram Van Driessche

6 October 2019 10	Antwerp	2–2	Standard Liège	Antwerp
18:00 CEST (UTC+2)	Refaelov 23' (pen.); Lamkel Zé (yellow card) 27'; Mbokani 55'; Arslanagić (yellow card) 75'; Hoedt (yellow card) 88'	Report	Vanheusden (yellow card) 27'; Emond 58', 72'; M'Poku (yellow card) 90'	Stadium: Bosuilstadion; Attendance: 12,978; Referee: Erik Lambrechts

19 October 2019 11	Standard Liège	1–0	Genk	Liège
18:00 CEST (UTC+2)	Cimirot (yellow card) 61'; Oularé (yellow card) 83'; Bastien 84'	Report	Dewaest (yellow card) 63'	Stadium: Stade Maurice Dufrasne; Attendance: 26,876; Referee: Nicolas Laforge

27 October 2019 12	Club Brugge	1–1	Standard Liège	Bruges
14:30 CET (UTC+1)	Okereke 47'; Balanta (yellow card) 65'	Report	Bastien 4'; Gavory (yellow card) 39'; Bodart (yellow card) 90+3'	Stadium: Jan Breydel Stadium; Attendance: 28,000; Referee: Lawrence Visser

30 October 2019 13	Standard Liège	2–0	Waasland-Beveren	Liège
20:30 CET (UTC+1)	Carcela 3'; Oularé 90'; Amallah (yellow card) 90+2'	Report	Wiegel (yellow card) 39'; Milošević (yellow card) 90+2'	Stadium: Stade Maurice Dufrasne; Attendance: 25,536; Referee: Nathan Verbroomen

3 November 2019 14	Gent	3–1	Standard Liège	Ghent
18:00 CET (UTC+1)	Odjidja-Ofoe (yellow card) 41' (yellow-red card) 71'; Bezus 48'; Jonathan David 85' (pen.); Castro-Montes 90', (yellow card) 90+1'	Report	Oularé (yellow card) 36'; Amallah 43', (yellow card) 67'; M'Poku (yellow card) 50'; Vanheusden (yellow card) 71' (yellow-red card) 83'	Stadium: Ghelamco Arena; Attendance: 19,441; Referee: Lothar D'hondt

10 November 2019 15	Standard Liège	1–2	Mechelen	Liège
20:00 CET (UTC+1)	Amallah 86', (yellow card) 90+3'; Oularé (yellow card) 90+6'	Report	Schoofs 15'; de Camargo 65'; Vanlerberghe (yellow card) 90+1'; Bijker (yellow card) 90+4'	Stadium: Stade Maurice Dufrasne; Attendance: 26,987; Referee: Alexandre Boucaut

23 November 2019 16	Eupen	1–2	Standard Liège	Eupen
18:00 CET (UTC+1)	Cools (yellow card) 12'; Verdon (yellow card) 45'; Schouterden 57'; Bolingi 80'	Report	M'Poku 14'; Bastien 90+3'	Stadium: Kehrwegstadion; Attendance: 7,463; Referee: Christof Dierick

1 December 2019 17	Standard Liège	2–1	Cercle Brugge	Liège
18:00 CET (UTC+1)	Amallah 28'; Vanheusden (yellow card) 50'; Avenatti 90+2'	Report	Cassaert (yellow card) 24'; Omolo (yellow card) 47', (goal) 75'; Foster (yellow card) 63'; Panzo (yellow card) 71'	Stadium: Stade Maurice Dufrasne; Attendance: 26,592; Referee: Erik Lambrechts

8 December 2019 18	Mouscron	2–2	Standard Liège	Mouscron
14:30 CET (UTC+1)	Perica 44', 81'; Mohamed (yellow card) 41'; Ciranni (yellow card) 62'	Report	Emond 6'; M'Poku (red card) 47'; Carcela (red card) 90'; Gavory (yellow card) 90+2'; Lestienne 90+4'	Stadium: Stade Le Canonnier; Attendance: 5,346; Referee: Jan Boterberg

15 December 2019 19	Standard Liège	1–1	Anderlecht	Liège
14:30 CET (UTC+1)	Amallah (yellow card) 37', (goal) 40'; Lestienne (yellow card) 85'	Report	Dewaele (yellow card) 38' (yellow-red card) 72'; Kayembe (yellow card) 46'; Roofe 67'	Stadium: Stade Maurice Dufrasne; Attendance: 26,972; Referee: Jonathan Lardot

21 December 2019 20	Waasland-Beveren	2–1	Standard Liège	Beveren
20:30 CET (UTC+1)	Caufriez (yellow card) 39'; Vukotić (yellow card) 57'; Koita (yellow card) 64'; Milošević 66', (yellow card) 88'; Jubitana (yellow card) 88'; Sula 88', (yellow card) 90+3'	Report	Goreux (yellow card) 21' (yellow-red card) 32'; Lestienne 35'	Stadium: Freethiel Stadion; Attendance: 4,000; Referee: Christof Dierick

26 December 2019 21	Standard Liège	0–1	Gent	Liège
20:30 CET (UTC+1)		Report	Yaremchuk (yellow card) 56'; Odjidja-Ofoe (yellow card) 62'; Kums 83'; Castro-Montes (yellow card) 88'	Stadium: Stade Maurice Dufrasne; Attendance: 26,761; Referee: Bram Van Driessche

17 January 2020 22	Mechelen	2–3	Standard Liège	Mechelen
20:30 CET (UTC+1)	De Camargo 50', 73'	Report	Carcela (yellow card) 21', (goal) 69'; Oularé (yellow card) 38'; Vojvoda (yellow card) 42'; Amallah 45+2'; Cimirot (yellow card) 75'; Avenatti 88'	Stadium: Achter de Kazerne; Attendance: 16,200; Referee: Wesley Alen

24 January 2020 23	Standard Liège	2–1	Oostende	Liège
20:30 CET (UTC+1)	Vojvoda 79'; Laifis 89'	Report	Bataille 54'; Guri (yellow card) 60'; Palaversa (yellow card) 65'	Stadium: Stade Maurice Dufrasne; Attendance: 26,402; Referee: Jasper Vergoote

31 January 2020 24	Kortrijk	3–1	Standard Liège	Kortrijk
20:30 CET (UTC+1)	De Sart 52'; Shamir 55' (o.g.); Moffi 70'	Report	Carcela 67'	Stadium: Guldensporen Stadion; Attendance: 7,333; Referee: Lothar D'hondt

12 February 2020 25	Standard Liège	0–0	Club Brugge	Liège
20:30 CET (UTC+1)	Oularé (yellow card) 53'; Amallah (yellow card) 64'	Report	Deli (yellow card) 49'; Vormer (yellow card) 53'	Stadium: Stade Maurice Dufrasne; Attendance: 27,145; Referee: Lawrence Visser

16 February 2020 26	Genk	1–3	Standard Liège	Genk
18:00 CET (UTC+1)	Wouters (yellow card) 63'; Dewaest (yellow card) 69', (goal) 84'	Report	Vanheusden 31'; Laifis (yellow card) 34'; Cimirot (yellow card) 37'; Čop 42'; Boljević 90+2'	Stadium: Luminus Arena; Attendance: 20,108; Referee: Nicolas Laforge

22 February 2020 27	Standard Liège	1–0	Antwerp	Liège
18:00 CET (UTC+1)	Oularé 33'; Amallah (yellow card) 38'	Report	Seck (yellow card) 45+1'; Defour (yellow card) 77'; Hoedt (yellow card) 90+5'	Stadium: Stade Maurice Dufrasne; Attendance: 27,143; Referee: Nathan Verboomen

1 March 2020 28	Sporting Charleroi	2–0	Standard Liège	Charleroi
18:00 CET (UTC+1)	Dessoleil 32'; Nicholson 56'; Ilaimaharitra (yellow card) 61'	Report	Laifis (yellow card) 31'; Vojvoda (yellow card) 67'; Vanheusden (yellow card) 90+1'	Stadium: Stade du Pays de Charleroi; Attendance: 13,304; Referee: Alexandre Boucaut

7 March 2020 29	Standard Liège	0–0	Sint-Truiden	Liège
20:00 CET (UTC+1)	Vanheusden (red card) 39'	Report	Sankhon (yellow card) 52'; Lee (yellow card) 62'; Teixeira (yellow card) 78'; Bushiri (yellow card) 81'	Stadium: Stade Maurice Dufrasne; Attendance: 26,007; Referee: Christof Dierick

15 March 2020 30	Zulte Waregem	Cancelled	Standard Liège	Waregem
18:00 CET (UTC+1)				Stadium: Regenboogstadion
Note: The match was cancelled due to the COVID-19 pandemic.

=== Belgian Cup ===
26 September 2019 Sixth round	Standard Liège	2–1	Lommel	Liège
20:30 CEST (UTC+2)	Boljević 17', 90+2'	Report	Sanyang 54'	Stadium: Stade Maurice Dufrasne; Referee: Kevin van Damme

4 December 2019 Seventh round	Standard Liège	3–0	Rebecq	Liège
20:00 CET (UTC+1)	Boljević 23'; Čop 59'; Fai 66'	Report		Stadium: Stade Maurice Dufrasne; Referee: Bert Put

18 December 2019 Quarter-final	Standard Liège	1–3	Antwerp	Liège
20:45 CET (UTC+1)	Lestienne 24'	Report	De Laet 48'; Benson 67'; Mbokani 85'	Stadium: Stade Maurice Dufrasne; Attendance: Erik Lambrechts

=== UEFA Europa League ===
==== Group stage ====
Pos	Team	Pld	W	D	L	GF	GA	GD	Pts	Qualification	ARS	FRA	STL	VSC
1	(England) Arsenal	6	3	2	1	14	7	+7	11	Advance to knockout phase	—	1–2	4–0	3–2
2	(Germany) Eintracht Frankfurt	6	3	0	3	8	10	−2	9	Advance to knockout phase	0–3	—	2–1	2–3
3	(Belgium) Standard Liège	6	2	2	2	8	10	−2	8		2–2	2–1	—	2–0
4	(Portugal) Vitória de Guimarães	6	1	2	3	7	10	−3	5		1–1	0–1	1–1	—

Source: UEFA
Rules for classification: Group stage tiebreakers

19 September 2019 1	Standard Liège (Belgium)	2–0	(Portugal) Vitória de Guimarães	Liège, Belgium
18:55 (CEST)	Carcela (yellow card) 61'; Hanin 66' (o.g.); Vojvoda (yellow card) 75'; M'Poku 90+1'	Report	Bondarenko (yellow card) 38'; Agu (yellow card) 65'	Stadium: Stade Maurice Dufrasne; Attendance: 13,477; Referee: Sergey Ivanov (Russia)

3 October 2019 2	Arsenal (England)	4–0	(Belgium) Standard Liège	London, England
21:00 (20:00 BST)	Martinelli 13', 16'; Willock 22'; Ceballos 57'; Bellerín (yellow card) 86'	Report	M'Poku (yellow card) 41'; Vojvoda (yellow card) 86'	Stadium: Emirates Stadium; Attendance: 58,725; Referee: Sandro Schärer (Switzerland)

24 October 2019 3	Eintracht Frankfurt (Germany)	2–1	(Belgium) Standard Liège	Frankfurt am Main, Germany
21:00	Abraham 28'; Hinteregger (yellow card) 52', (goal) 73'	Report	Amallah 82'; Fai (yellow card) 82'	Stadium: Waldstadion; Attendance: 47,000; Referee: Daniel Stefański (Poland)

7 November 2019 4	Standard Liège (Belgium)	2–1	(Germany) Eintracht Frankfurt	Liège, Belgium
18:55	Amallah (yellow card) 54'; Vanheusden 56'; Laifis (yellow card) 64'; Cimirot (yellow card) 71'; Emond (yellow card) 88'; Lestienne 90+4'	Report	Sow (yellow card) 37'; Kostić 65'	Stadium: Stade Maurice Dufrasne; Attendance: 15,952; Referee: Matej Jug (Slovenia)

28 November 2019 5	Vitória de Guimarães (Portugal)	1–1	(Belgium) Standard Liège	Guimarães, Portugal
21:00 (20:00 WET)	Hanin (yellow card) 39'; Tapsoba (yellow card) 42'; Agu (yellow card) 44'; Pereira 45+2'; Evangelista (yellow card) 47'	Report	Lestienne 39' (pen.); Bastien (yellow card) 42'; M'Poku (yellow card) 51'; Laifis (yellow card) 64'; Vanheusden (yellow card) 84'	Stadium: Estádio D. Afonso Henriques; Attendance: 11,221; Referee: Serhiy Boyko (Ukraine)

12 December 2019 6	Standard Liège (Belgium)	2–2	(England) Arsenal	Liège, Belgium
18:55	Bastien 47'; Amallah 69'	Report	Lacazette 78'; Saka 81'	Stadium: Stade Maurice Dufrasne; Attendance: 21,797; Referee: Andreas Ekberg (Sweden)

== Statistics ==
=== Squad appearances and goals ===
Last updated on 7 March 2020.

No.	Pos	Nat	Player	Total		Belgian Division		Belgian Cup		UEFA Europa League	
No.	Pos	Nat	Player	Apps	Goals	Apps	Goals	Apps	Goals	Apps	Goals
Goalkeepers
1	GK	(Belgium) BEL	Jean-François Gillet	0	0	0	0	0	0	0	0
16	GK	(Belgium) BEL	Arnaud Bodart	35	0	29	0	3	0	3	0
30	GK	(Serbia) SRB	Vanja Milinković-Savić	3	0	0	0	0	0	3	0
33	GK	(Belgium) BEL	Timothy Galje	0	0	0	0	0	0	0	0
Defenders
3	DF	(Belgium) BEL	Zinho Vanheusden	28	2	20	1	2+1	0	4+1	1
4	DF	(Belgium) BEL	Dimitri Lavalée	8	0	3+2	0	2	0	1	0
21	DF	(Cameroon) CMR	Collins Fai	13	1	5+3	0	2	1	3	0
23	DF	(Belgium) BEL	Senna Miangue	5	0	0+4	0	1	0	0	0
24	DF	(France) FRA	Nicolas Gavory	36	0	29	0	1	0	6	0
27	DF	(Kosovo) KOS	Mërgim Vojvoda	30	1	24+1	1	2	0	3	0
29	DF	(Belgium) BEL	Luis Pedro Cavanda	0	0	0	0	0	0	0	0
34	DF	(Cyprus) CYP	Konstantinos Laifis	35	3	28	3	1	0	6	0
36	DF	(Belgium) BEL	Noë Dussenne	2	0	1+1	0	0	0	0	0
37	DF	(Mali) MLI	Hady Sangaré	0	0	0	0	0	0	0	0
Midfielders
2	MF	(Haiti) HAI	Réginal Goreux	1	0	0	0	1	0	0	0
8	MF	(Bosnia and Herzegovina) BIH	Gojko Cimirot	36	1	27	1	3	0	6	0
10	MF	(Morocco) MAR	Mehdi Carcela	34	3	17+9	3	1+1	0	5+1	0
15	MF	(Israel) ISR	Eden Shamir	3	0	2+1	0	0	0	0	0
18	MF	(Montenegro) MNE	Aleksandar Boljević	27	6	7+14	3	3	3	2+1	0
19	MF	(Morocco) MAR	Selim Amallah	32	9	21+4	7	1+1	0	3+2	2
20	MF	(Democratic Republic of the Congo) COD	Merveille Bokadi	8	0	5+1	0	1	0	1	0
22	MF	(Belgium) BEL	Maxime Lestienne	34	10	24+3	7	1+1	1	2+3	2
26	MF	(Belgium) BEL	Nicolas Raskin	3	1	1+1	0	0+1	0	0	1
28	MF	(Belgium) BEL	Samuel Bastien	32	4	26	4	0	0	6	0
32	MF	(Belgium) BEL	Joachim Carcela	1	0	0+1	0	0	0	0	0
Forwards
7	FW	(Croatia) CRO	Duje Čop	17	2	5+7	1	1+1	1	2+1	0
12	FW	(Romania) ROU	Denis Drăguș	4	0	0+2	0	0+2	0	0	0
17	FW	(Belgium) BEL	Obbi Oularé	17	2	9+5	2	0	0	0+3	0
25	FW	(Uruguay) URU	Felipe Avenatti	24	2	5+13	2	2+1	0	0+3	0
Players who have made an appearance this season but have left the club
40	MF	(Democratic Republic of the Congo) COD	Paul-José M'Poku	9	1	0	0	3	0	4+2	1
14	FW	(Belgium) BEL	Anthony Limbombe	7	1	2+4	1	0	0	1	0
9	FW	(Belgium) BEL	Renaud Emond	20	7	10+4	7	1	0	5	0
