= Le Canonnier =

Le Canonnier may refer to:

- Le Canonnier (Hotel) - a hotel in Mauritius
- Stade Le Canonnier - a Football stadium in Belgium
