= Carcela =

Carcela is a surname. Notable people with the surname include:

- Joachim Carcela (born 1999), Belgian-Spanish footballer, cousin of Mehdi
- Mehdi Carcela (born 1989), Belgian-Moroccan footballer
