= Nuno da Costa =

Cape Verdean footballer (born 1991)

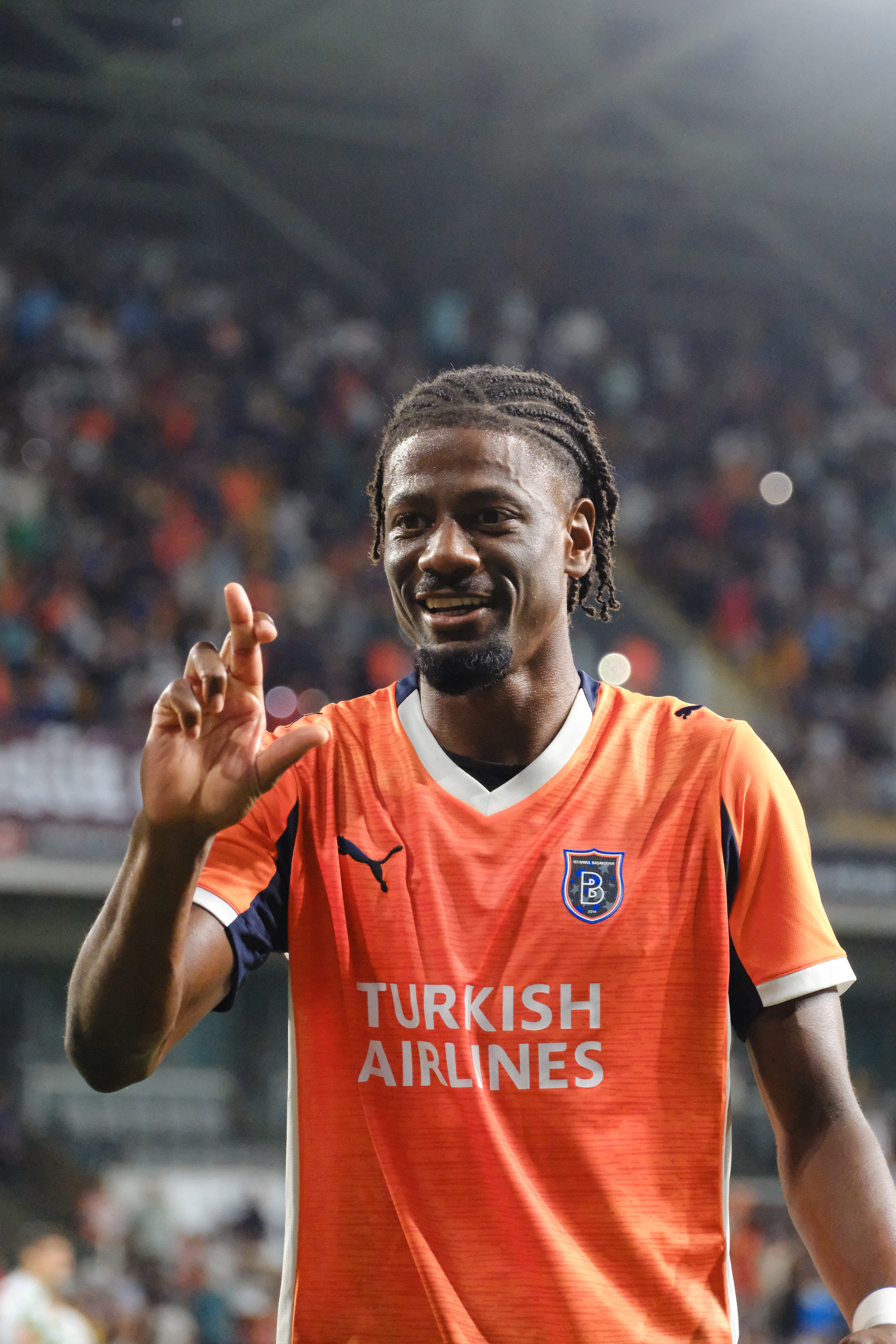
- Nuno da Costa, 2025

Personal information
- Full name: Nuno Miguel da Costa Jóia
- Date of birth: 10 February 1991 (age 35)
- Place of birth: Praia, Cape Verde
- Height: 1.84 m (6 ft 0 in)
- Positions: Forward; winger

Team information
- Current team: Antalyaspor
- Number: 9

Youth career
- 2003–2005: União Mercês

Senior career*
Years	Team	Apps	(Gls)
2011–2015	Aubagne	66	(22)
2015	Valenciennes II	4	(0)
2015–2017	Valenciennes	45	(19)
2017–2020	Strasbourg	74	(14)
2018	Strasbourg II	1	(1)
2020–2022	Nottingham Forest	12	(0)
2020–2021	→ Mouscron (loan)	25	(6)
2021–2022	→ Caen (loan)	24	(9)
2022–2023	Auxerre	38	(5)
2023–2025	Kasımpaşa	58	(27)
2025–2026	İstanbul Başakşehir	26	(3)
2026–	Antalyaspor	3	(1)

International career^{‡}
2016–	Cape Verde	14	(2)
- * Club domestic league appearances and goals as of 22:19, 21 September 2026 (UTC) ‡ National team caps and goals as of 15:25, 29 September 2026 (UTC)

Nuno Miguel da Costa Jóia (Portuguese: [ˈnu.nu mi.ˈɡɛl dɐ ˈkɔʃ.tɐ ˈʒɔ.jɐ]; born 10 February 1991), known as Nuno da Costa, is a Cape Verdean professional footballer who plays as a forward or winger for TFF 1. Lig club Antalyaspor and the Cape Verde national team.

Raised in France, he began his senior career with Aubagne in the fifth tier before moving to Valenciennes of Ligue 2 in 2015. Two years later he debuted in Ligue 1 with Strasbourg, where he won the Coupe de la Ligue in 2019. In January 2020, he signed for Nottingham Forest.

Da Costa scored on his senior international debut for Cape Verde in June 2016.

== Club career ==
=== Early career ===
Born in Praia, Cape Verde, Da Costa was raised in Portugal from 1993 and began playing with U.R. Mercês in Lisbon. He then moved to Aubagne in southern France, where he started his senior career with Aubagne FC in France's fifth tier.

On 4 January 2014, Da Costa scored the opening goal of a 3–3 draw at home to Ligue 2 club Dijon FCO in the last 64 of the Coupe de France, losing on penalties.

=== Valenciennes ===
Da Costa joined Valenciennes FC of Ligue 2 on 3 August 2015, following a season of 14 goals and eight assists. In his first professional season, he scored ten goals, including two on 6 May 2016 in a 4–1 win away to relegated Paris FC. He followed this with nine more in his second year, including a brace in a 3–3 home draw with FC Bourg-Peronnas on 18 November.

=== Strasbourg ===
On 3 July 2017, Da Costa signed a four-year deal with Ligue 1 club RC Strasbourg, replacing Khalid Boutaïb who had left for Malatyaspor. In his first top-flight season he found the net five times, including both goals of a 2–1 win at OGC Nice on 22 October that earned him a place in L'Équipe's team of the week. On 4 November, he was sent off after half an hour of a 2–0 loss at Troyes AC.

Da Costa was an 81st-minute substitute for Lebo Mothiba as they won the 2019 Coupe de la Ligue Final on penalties against EA Guingamp on 30 March. Four days later, he scored twice in a 4–0 win over Stade Reims at the Stade de la Meinau, part of his eight of the season. After that game, former France international Daniel Bravo described Da Costa's goal as "not bad for a black guy" during his beIN Sports punditry; he apologised in person for offence caused to the player, who accepted the apology.

=== Nottingham Forest ===
On 29 January 2020, Da Costa joined EFL Championship club Nottingham Forest. The length and cost of the deal was not disclosed. He debuted on 11 February in a 1–0 home loss to Charlton Athletic, playing the last twenty minutes in place of Ryan Yates; days later he was injured in an under-23 game against Crewe Alexandra.

Da Costa was loaned to Belgian First Division A side Royal Excel Mouscron for the season on 5 October 2020, with the option to make the deal permanent. He scored six goals during his stint, including both of a 2–2 home draw with OH Leuven on 15 December.

On 31 August 2021, Da Costa was loaned out again for a year, returning to the French Ligue 2 at Caen.

=== Auxerre ===
On 5 August 2022, Da Costa joined Ligue 1 side AJ Auxerre.

=== Kasımpaşa ===
On 12 September 2023, Da Costa signed for Turkish Süper Lig side Kasımpaşa. The duration of the contract and transfer fee were both undisclosed.

== International career ==
Da Costa made his international debut for Cape Verde on 4 June 2016 in a 2017 Africa Cup of Nations qualification match away to São Tomé and Príncipe. He came on in the 73rd minute for Garry Rodrigues, and six minutes later scored in a 2–1 win. He did not play again until the return of manager Rui Águas on 9 September 2018, in a 1–1 draw away to Lesotho in the unsuccessful 2019 Africa Cup of Nations qualification campaign.

On 18 May 2026, he was called up by Cape Verde's head coach Bubista for the 2026 FIFA World Cup.

== Career statistics ==
=== Club ===
As of match played 21 September 2026

Appearances and goals by club, season and competition
Club	Season	League			National cup		League cup		Continental		Total	
Club	Season	Division	Apps	Goals	Apps	Goals	Apps	Goals	Apps	Goals	Apps	Goals
Aubagne	2012–13	CFA 2	20	4	0	0	—		—		20	4
Aubagne	2013–14	CFA 2	21	4	2	1	—		—		23	5
Aubagne	2014–15	CFA 2	25	14	0	0	—		—		25	14
Aubagne	Total		66	22	2	1	0	0	0	0	68	23
Valenciennes II	2015–16	CFA 2	4	0	—		—		—		4	0
Valenciennes	2015–16	Ligue 2	23	10	1	0	0	0	—		24	10
Valenciennes	2016–17	Ligue 2	22	9	1	0	1	0	—		24	9
Valenciennes	Total		45	19	2	0	1	0	0	0	48	19
Strasbourg	2017–18	Ligue 1	26	5	2	2	0	0	—		28	7
Strasbourg	2018–19	Ligue 1	34	8	2	0	3	0	—		39	8
Strasbourg	2019–20	Ligue 1	14	1	0	0	1	1	5 (Note: Appearance(s) in UEFA Europa League)	0	20	2
Strasbourg	Total		74	14	4	2	4	1	5	0	87	17
Strasbourg II	2017–18	National 3	1	1	—		—		—		1	1
Nottingham Forest	2019–20	EFL Championship	10	0	0	0	0	0	—		10	0
Nottingham Forest	2020–21	EFL Championship	2	0	0	0	1	0	—		3	0
Nottingham Forest	2021–22	EFL Championship	0	0	0	0	1	0	—		1	0
Nottingham Forest	Total		12	0	0	0	2	0	—		14	0
Mouscron (loan)	2020–21	First Division A	25	6	0	0	0	0	—		25	6
Caen (loan)	2021–22	Ligue 2	24	9	1	1	0	0	—		25	10
Auxerre	2022–23	Ligue 1	33	5	3	1	0	0	—		36	6
Auxerre	2023–24	Ligue 2	5	0	0	0	0	0	—		5	0
Auxerre	Total		38	5	3	1	0	0	—		41	6
Kasımpaşa	2023–24	Süper Lig	29	14	2	0	—		—		31	14
Kasımpaşa	2024–25	Süper Lig	29	13	0	0	—		—		29	13
Kasımpaşa	Total		58	27	2	0	—		—		60	27
İstanbul Başakşehir	2025–26	Süper Lig	26	3	3	2	6 (Note: Appearance(s) in UEFA Conference League)	1	—		35	6
Antalyaspor	2026–27	TFF 1. Lig	3	1	0	0	—		—	3	1	
Career total			376	107	17	7	13	2	5	0	411	116

=== International ===
As of 29 September 2026

Appearances and goals by national team and year
National team	Year	Apps	Goals
Cape Verde	2016	1	1
Cape Verde	2018	2	0
Cape Verde	2025	2	0
Cape Verde	2026	9	1
Total		14	2

Scores and results list Cape Verde's goal tally first, score column indicates score after each da Costa goal.

List of international goals scored by Nuno da Costa
No.	Date	Venue	Opponent	Score	Result	Competition
1	4 June 2016	Estádio Nacional 12 de Julho, São Tomé, São Tomé and Principe	São Tomé and Príncipe	2–0	2–1	2017 Africa Cup of Nations qualification
2	6 June 2026	Pratt & Whitney Stadium at Rentschler Field, East Hartford, United States	Bermuda	3–0	3–0	Friendly

== Honours ==
Strasbourg

- Coupe de la Ligue: 2018–19
