= Agim Zeka =

Albanian footballer (born 1998)

Personal information
- Full name: Agim Sali Zeka
- Date of birth: 6 September 1998 (age 28)
- Place of birth: Pristina, FR Yugoslavia
- Height: 1.83 m (6 ft 0 in)
- Position: Right winger

Team information
- Current team: Drenica
- Number: 18

Youth career
- 2004–2016: Prishtina
- 2015: → KEK (loan)
- 2016: Skënderbeu Korçë

Senior career*
Years	Team	Apps	(Gls)
2016–2017	Skënderbeu Korçë	3	(0)
2017–2020	Lille B	24	(1)
2018	→ Varzim (loan)	2	(1)
2018–2019	→ Leixões (loan)	3	(0)
2019	→ Fortuna Sittard (loan)	5	(1)
2020–2021	Mouscron	0	(0)
2021	Austria Wien	11	(1)
2021–2022	Drita	6	(0)
2022	Prishtina	9	(1)
2022–2023	Drenica	25	(3)
2023–2024	Erzeni	34	(5)
2024–2025	Partizani	31	(2)
2025–2026	Murcia	1	(0)
2026–	Drenica	0	(0)

International career
2014	Albania U17	3	(1)
2016	Albania U19	3	(3)
2017	Albania U20	1	(0)
2017–2019	Albania U21	2	(0)
- * Club domestic league appearances and goals as of 26 September 2026

Agim Sali Zeka (born 6 September 1998) is a professional footballer who plays as a right winger for Drenica. Born in Yugoslavia, he represented Albania at youth level.

== Club career ==
=== Early career and Skënderbeu Korçë ===
Zeka at the age of six started playing football in Prishtina, where he has played in all age groups. In January 2015, due to ignorance by the Prishtina's staff, Zeka was loaned to the youth team of KEK, where after the end of the loan, he returned to Prishtina until January 2016, where he joined the U19 team of the Albanian club Skënderbeu Korçë. On 21 February 2016, Zeka made his debut with Skënderbeu Korçë U19 in a league match against Besa Kavajë U19 after coming on as a substitute at 42nd minute in place of Andis Foto and scored his side's second goal during a 9–0 home win.

==== Promotion to the first team ====
In 2016–17 season, Zeka is promoted to the first team of Skënderbeu Korçë, which competed in the Kategoria Superiore, which is the top tier of football in the country. On 28 September 2016, he made his debut with Skënderbeu Korçë in the 2016–17 Albanian Cup first round against Butrinti after being named in the starting line-up.

=== Lille B ===
On 31 January 2017, Zeka signed a four-and-a-half-year contract with Championnat de France Amateur club Lille B. Lille B reportedly paid a €300K transfer fee to Skënderbeu Korçë and also the later kept 20% of his card. Four days later, he made his debut in a 0–1 home defeat against L'Entente after being named in the starting line-up.

==== Loan to Varzim ====
On 9 January 2018, Zeka joined LigaPro side Varzim, on a season-long loan. Five days later, he made his debut in a 2–1 away defeat against Vitória Guimarães B after coming on as a substitute at 83rd minute in place of Mário Sérgio. One month after debut, Zeka scored his first goal for Varzim in his second appearance for the club in a 2–3 away win over Penafiel in LigaPro.

==== Loan to Leixões ====
On 8 August 2018, Zeka joined LigaPro side Leixões, on a season-long loan. Three days later, he made his debut in a 2–1 away defeat against Benfica B after coming on as a substitute at 73rd minute in place of Erivaldo.

==== Loan to Fortuna Sittard ====
On 28 January 2019, Zeka joined Eredivisie side Fortuna Sittard, on a season-long loan. Fourteen days later, he made his debut, but with U21 team in a 0–2 home defeat against PEC Zwolle U21 after being named in the starting line-up. On 12 May 2019, he made his first team debut in a 3–0 away defeat against Groningen after coming on as a substitute at 76th minute in place of Mark Diemers.

=== Mouscron ===
On 1 August 2020, Lille B announced the transfer of Zeka to Belgian side Mouscron. In same day later, the club confirmed that he had joined on a one-year contract. He was named as a Mouscron substitute, twice in August for league games against Antwerp (seven days after joining), and Mechelen (six days later), but was an unused substitute in these matches which were the last he was called up by the team.

=== Austria Wien ===
On 20 January 2021, Zeka joined Austrian Bundesliga side Austria Wien and received squad number 23. Seventeen days later, he made his debut with Austria Wien in the 2020–21 Austrian Cup quarter-finals against Red Bull Salzburg after coming on as a substitute at 86th minute in place of Stephan Zwierschitz. Zeka made his first Austrian Bundesliga appearance four days later after coming on as a substitute at 82nd minute in place of Andreas Poulsen in a 3–1 away defeat again against Red Bull Salzburg.

=== Spells in Kosovo ===
On 1 August 2021, Zeka signed a two-year contract with Football Superleague of Kosovo club Drita. In January 2022, he then moved to fellow league club FC Prishtina. On 6 September 2022, Zeka moved to KF Drenica.

=== Murcia ===
On 11 July 2025, Zeka moved to Murcia in Spanish third-tier Primera Federación.

== International career ==
=== Under-17 ===
On 6 October 2014, Zeka was named as part of the Albania U17 squad for 2015 UEFA European Under-17 Championship qualifications. Two days later, he made his debut with Albania U17 in a match against Norway U17 after being named in the starting line-up. Five days after debut, Zeka scored his first goal for Albania U17 in his third appearance for the country in a 5–1 home win over San Marino U17.

=== Under-19 ===
On 30 September 2016, Zeka was named as part of the Albania U19 squad for 2017 UEFA European Under-19 Championship qualifications. Six days later, he made his debut with Albania U19 in a match against Republic of Ireland U19 after being named in the starting line-up. Two days after debut, Zeka scored his first goals for Albania U19 in his second appearance for the country in a 2–3 home defeat over Germany U19, he had the same fate three days later when scored a goal in a 1–0 home minimal win over Gibraltar U19.

=== Under-21 and Under-20 ===
On 2 June 2017, Zeka received an urgent call-up from Albania U21 for the friendly match against France U21 and 2019 UEFA European Under-21 Championship qualification opening match against Estonia U21 to replace one of the three injured players. Three days later, he made his debut with Albania U21 in friendly match against France U21 after coming on as a substitute at 52nd minute in place of Elvir Maloku. Five month later, Zeka received a call-up from Albania U20 for the friendly match against Georgia U20, and made his debut after being named in the starting line-up.

== Career statistics ==
=== Club ===
As of 1 August 2021

Appearances and goals by club, season and competition
Club	Season	League			Cup		Other		Total	
Club	Season	Division	Apps	Goals	Apps	Goals	Apps	Goals	Apps	Goals
Skënderbeu Korçë	2016–17	Kategoria Superiore	3	0	3	0	—		6	0
Lille B	2016–17	Championnat National 2	11	0	0	0	—		11	0
Lille B	2017–18	Championnat National 2	9	1	0	0	—		9	0
Varzim (loan)	2017–18	LigaPro	2	1	0	0	—		2	1
Leixões (loan)	2018–19	LigaPro	3	0	0	0	—		3	0
Fortuna Sittard (loan)	2018–19	Eredivisie	1	0	0	0	6 (Note: All appearance(s) with Fortuna Sittard U21)	2	7	2
Fortuna Sittard (loan)	2019–20	Eredivisie	4	0	1	1	4	2	9	3
Lille B	2019–20	Championnat National 2	4	0	0	0	—		4	0
Lille B	Total		37	2	4	1	10	4	51	6
Mouscron	2020–21	Belgian First Division A	0	0	0	0	—		0	0
Austria Wien	2020–21	Austrian Bundesliga	10	1	1	0	1 (Note: Appearance in 2020–21 Austrian Bundesliga Europa Conference League play-offs)	0	12	1
Austria Wien	Total		10	1	1	0	1	0	12	1
Drita	2021–22	Kosovo Superleague	0	0	0	0	—		0	0
Career total			47	3	5	1	11	4	63	7
