= Matías Silvestre =

Argentine footballer (born 1984)

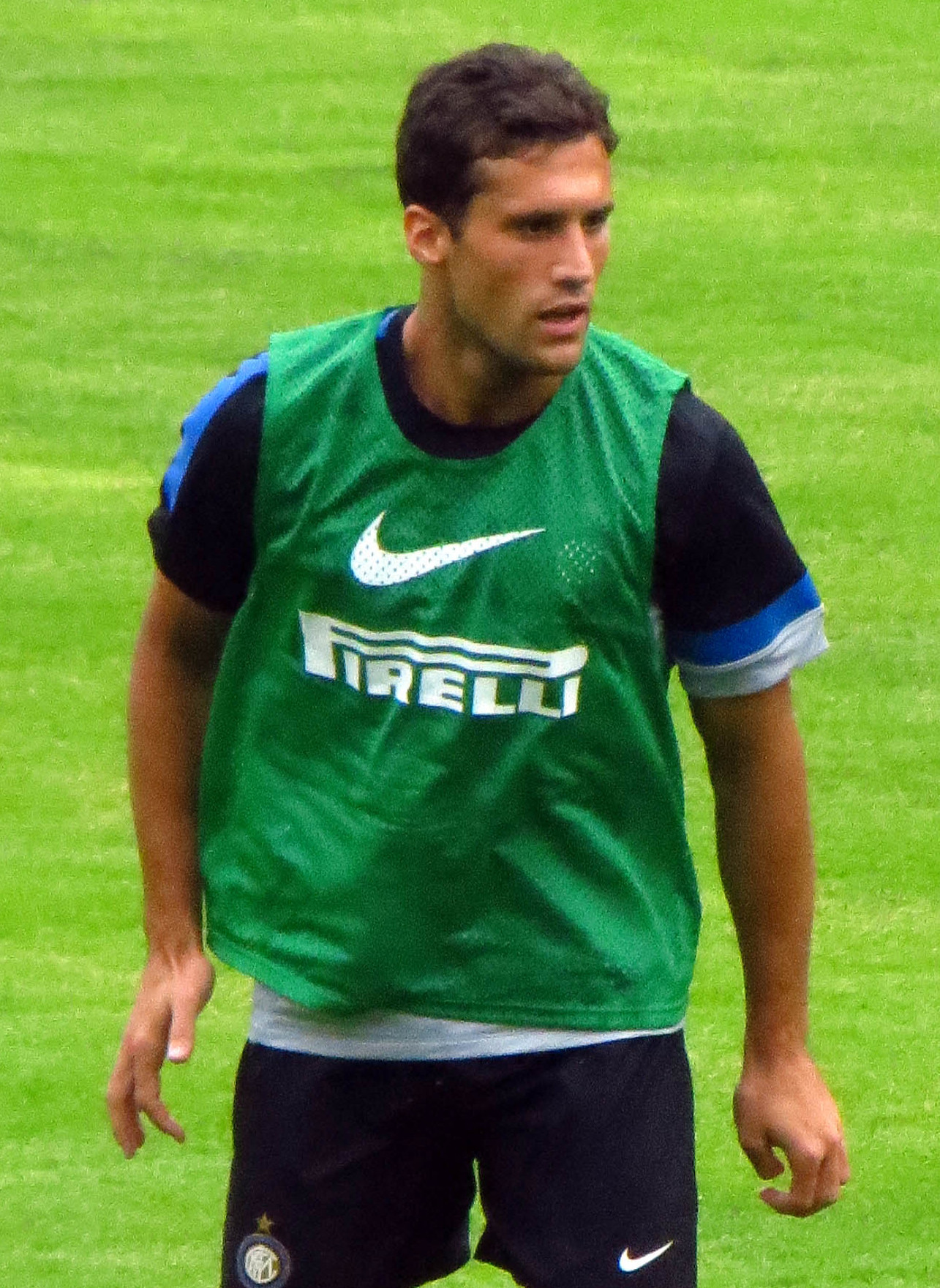
- Silvestre training with Inter in 2012

Personal information
- Full name: Matías Agustín Silvestre
- Date of birth: 25 September 1984 (age 42)
- Place of birth: Mercedes, Argentina
- Height: 1.87 m (6 ft 2 in)
- Position: Centre-back

Youth career
- 1992–1994: Club Mercedes
- 1994–2003: Boca Juniors

Senior career*
Years	Team	Apps	(Gls)
2003–2008	Boca Juniors	63	(6)
2008–2011	Catania	118	(7)
2011–2012	Palermo	29	(5)
2012–2014	Inter Milan	9	(0)
2013–2014	→ AC Milan (loan)	4	(1)
2014–2018	Sampdoria	124	(1)
2018–2020	Empoli	34	(2)
2020	Livorno	5	(0)
2020–2021	Mouscron	24	(3)
2021–2022	Entella	20	(0)
Total		430	(25)
- * Club domestic league appearances and goals as of 23 April 2022

Matías Agustín Silvestre (born 25 September 1984) is an Argentine former professional footballer who played as a centre-back.

== Club career ==
=== Boca Juniors ===
Silvestre began his career with Argentine team Boca Juniors, where he would go on to make his league debut on 23 March 2003 in a 3–1 win over Lanús. Silvestre soon was inserted into the Boca Juniors starting line-up and between 2003 and 2007, he went on to make 63 league appearances, scoring six goals. He was used as both a central defender and a right full-back during his spell with the club. Following an impressive 2007 season of the club, Silvestre was transferred to Catania in the Serie A.

=== Catania ===
During the 2008 January transfer window, Silvestre transferred to Sicilian club Catania on loan. His first six months at Catania was not so great as he was not part of then-coach Silvio Baldini's starting team, making just 11 appearances, just five as a starter. However, his loan was nonetheless made permanent in the summer of 2008 for €2.043 million after Walter Zenga was appointed head coach, following the sacking of Baldini. He soon became an instrumental part of Catania's first team and was a major influence on their fairly successful 2008–09 season as the club avoided relegation for the third consecutive season.

Silvestre continued to shine during his third season in Sicily as the defender went on to make more appearances than any of his teammates during the 2009–10 campaign. He formed a solid defensive line-up with the likes of Pablo Álvarez, Nicolás Spolli, Christian Terlizzi and Ciro Capuano as Catania recorded their record-breaking points total in Serie A, finishing in 13th place with just 45 goals conceded in 38 matches. During the 2010–11 Serie A campaign, Silvestre earned captaincy at the Sicilian club, following the sale of Giuseppe Mascara to Napoli on 31 January 2011. He has made 116 total appearances for his club, scoring seven goals, six of which have come during the 2010–11 Serie A season, a season which recorded a third consecutive record points total for the Sicilian club. On 9 July 2011, Marco Biagianti was assigned captaincy of the club for the 2011–12 Serie A season.

=== Palermo ===
On 8 August 2011, Silvestre moved to Palermo for €7 million in a four-year contract, with Davide Lanzafame moving in the opposite direction in co-ownership deal for €1 million. Silvestre debuted for the Rosanero on 11 September 2011 in the 4–3 victory against Internazionale, on the second day of the season (the first was postponed). He scored his first Palermo goal in a 3–1 win over Bologna on the 11th matchday of Serie A, making the score 2–0.

On 19 February 2012, in Palermo's 4–1 win over Siena, Silvestre suffered an injury to his right thigh, forcing him to leave the match. Nearly two months later, on 22 April, Silvestre returned to the pitch in Palermo's 2–2 draw with Cesena. In the second-last match of the Serie A season, on 6 May, Silvestre scored in Palermo's 4–4 draw with Chievo. He finished the season with 4 goals from 28 appearances.

=== Inter ===
On 6 July 2012, Palermo loaned Silvestre to Inter Milan for €3 million (paid via the 50% registration rights of goalkeeper Emiliano Viviano), with an obligation to purchase outright for €6 million. Silvestre was issued shirt number 6.

Silvestre made his Nerazzurri debut in the third qualifying round of the 2012–13 UEFA Europa League against Hajduk Split, a 3–0 away win. On 28 April 2013, in Inter's 1–0 defeat to Palermo, Silvestre incurred an injury to his right thigh, prematurely ending his season, making 20 total appearances.

==== Loans to Milan and Sampdoria ====
On 30 July 2013, Silvestre was loaned for one year to Inter's rivals Milan for €1 million, with an option to purchase him outright at end of the loan for €4 million. Silvestre chose to wear shirt number 26. He made his Rossoneri debut on 19 October in the 1–0 home victory against Udinese, and in the next round, a 3–2 defeat away to Parma, he scored his first goal with Milan. After four appearances and one goal with Milan, he returned to Inter as Milan declined to exercise its option to purchase Silvestre.

On 29 August 2014, Silvestre joined Sampdoria on loan from Inter. He chose the number 26 shirt he previously wore at Milan. Two days later, he made his Blucerchiato debut after appearing as a substitute for Gianluca Sansone in the 1–1 away draw with former club Palermo. Silvestre made 30 appearances for Sampdoria and became unattached at the end of the 2014–15 season following the expiration of his contract with Inter.

=== Sampdoria ===
On 9 July 2015, following his release from Inter, Silvestre returned to Sampdoria, signing a two-year contract.

=== Empoli ===
On 6 August 2018, Silvestre signed with Serie A club Empoli a 1-year contract.

=== Livorno ===
On 6 February 2020, he joined Serie B club Livorno.

=== Mouscron ===
On 20 July 2020, he moved to Belgium and signed with Mouscron.

=== Entella ===
On 2 September 2021, he returned to Italy and signed with Entella in Serie C.

== Career statistics ==
=== Club ===
As of match played 27 February 2022

Club	Season	League	League		Cup		Continental		Total	
Club	Season	League	Apps	Goals	Apps	Goals	Apps	Goals	Apps	Goals
Boca Juniors	2002–03	Primera División	5	1	–		3 (Note: Appearance(s) in Copa Sudamericana)	0	8	1
Boca Juniors	2003–04	Primera División	4	0	–		2 (Note: Appearance(s) in Copa Libertadores)	0	6	0
Boca Juniors	2004–05	Primera División	10	0	–		5	0	15	0
Boca Juniors	2005–06	Primera División	21	4	–		2	0	23	4
Boca Juniors	2006–07	Primera División	21	1	–		8	0	29	1
Boca Juniors	2007–08	Primera División	2	0	–		–		2	0
Boca Juniors	Total		63	6	0	0	20	0	83	6
Catania	2007–08	Serie A	11	0	2	0	–		13	0
Catania	2008–09	Serie A	36	0	3	0	–		39	0
Catania	2009–10	Serie A	35	1	1	0	–		36	1
Catania	2010–11	Serie A	36	6	2	0	–		38	6
Catania	Total		118	7	8	0	0	0	126	7
Palermo	2011–12	Serie A	29	5	0	0	–		29	5
Inter Milan	2012–13	Serie A	9	0	2	0	9 (Note: Appearance(s) in UEFA Europa League)	0	20	0
Milan	2013–14	Serie A	4	1	0	0	0	0	4	1
Sampdoria	2014–15	Serie A	29	0	1	0	–		30	0
Sampdoria	2015–16	Serie A	25	0	0	0	2	0	27	0
Sampdoria	2016–17	Serie A	36	0	2	0	–		38	0
Sampdoria	2017–18	Serie A	34	1	3	0	–		37	1
Sampdoria	Total	Serie A	124	1	6	0	2	0	132	1
Empoli	2018–19	Serie A	34	2	1	0	–		35	2
Livorno	2019–20	Serie B	5	0	–		–		5	0
Mouscron	2020–21	First Division A	24	3	1	0	–		25	3
Entella	2021–22	Serie C	19	2	–		–		19	2
Career Total			429	27	32	0	31	0	492	27

== Honours ==
=== Club ===
Boca Juniors

- Copa Libertadores: 2007
- Copa Sudamericana: 2004, 2005
- Recopa Sudamericana: 2005, 2006
- Primera División Argentina: 2003 Apertura, 2005 Apertura, 2006 Clausura
