= Hamza Massoudi =

Belgian footballer

Personal information
- Date of birth: 24 January 2000 (age 26)
- Place of birth: Brussels, Belgium
- Height: 1.75 m (5 ft 9 in)
- Position: Midfielder

Team information
- Current team: Dessel Sport
- Number: 70

Youth career
- 2016–2018: Standard Liège
- 2018–2019: Sint-Truidense

Senior career*
Years	Team	Apps	(Gls)
2019–2021	Sint-Truidense	6	(1)
2023–	Dessel Sport	0	(0)
- * Club domestic league appearances and goals as of 16 August 2023

Hamza Massoudi (born 24 January 2000) is a Belgian footballer who plays for Dessel Sport.

== Career ==
On 2 August 2023, Massoudi signed a contract with Dessel Sport, on a one-year contract.

== Personal life ==
Born in Belgium, Massoudi is of Moroccan descent.
