= Selim Amallah =

Morocco international footballer (born 1996)

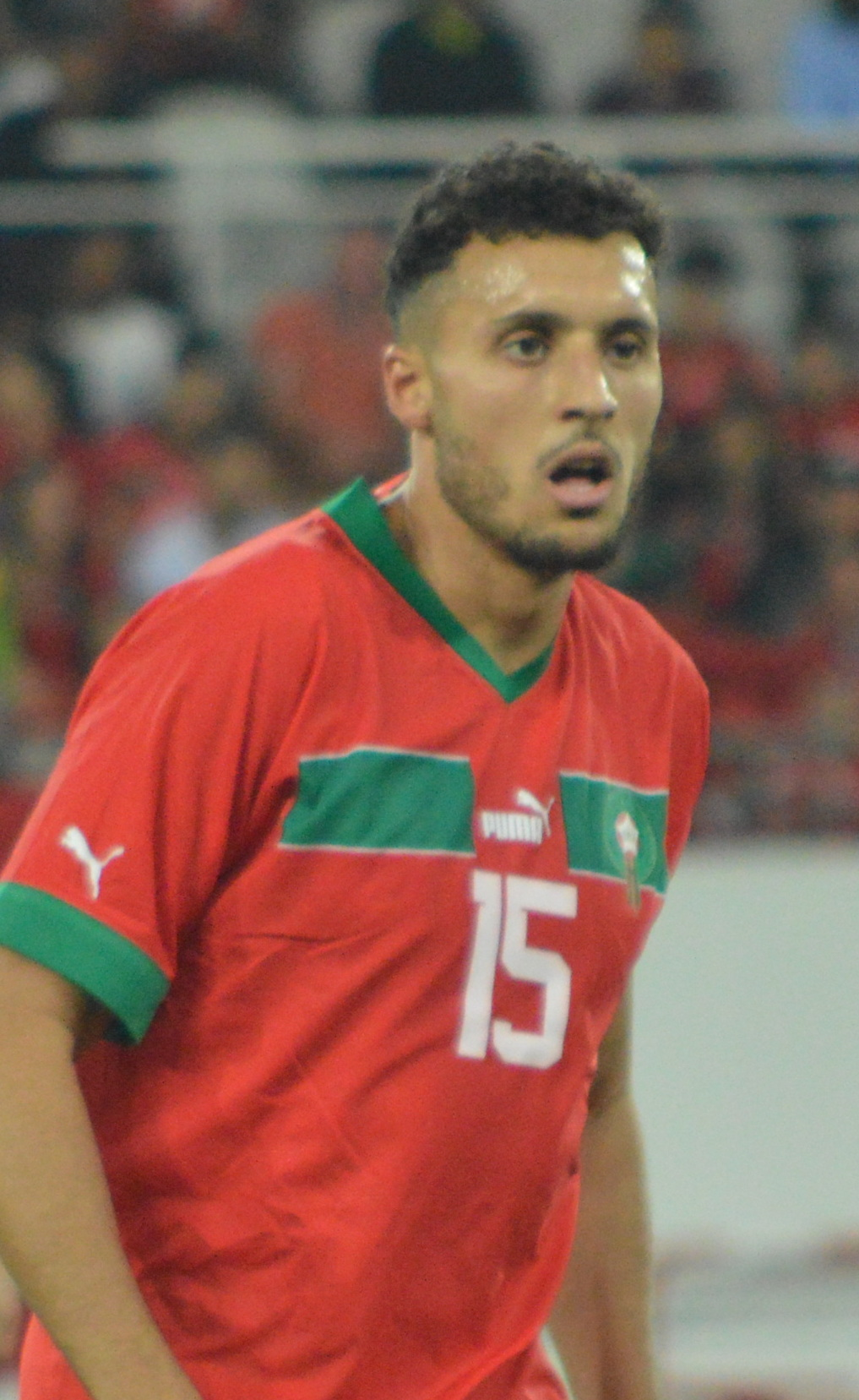
- Amallah with Morocco in 2023

Personal information
- Full name: Selim Amallah
- Date of birth: 15 November 1996 (age 29)
- Place of birth: Hautrage , Belgium
- Height: 1.89 m (6 ft 2 in)
- Position: Midfielder

Team information
- Current team: Khor Fakkan
- Number: 21

Youth career
- 2003–2008: RAEC Mons
- 2008–2012: Anderlecht
- 2012–2015: RAEC Mons

Senior career*
Years	Team	Apps	(Gls)
2015–2016	Mouscron	3	(0)
2016–2017	Tubize	24	(0)
2017–2019	Mouscron	52	(14)
2019–2023	Standard Liège	80	(24)
2023–2025	Valladolid	32	(5)
2023–2024	→ Valencia (loan)	20	(0)
2025–	Khor Fakkan	6	(1)

International career^{‡}
2019–	Morocco	31	(4)
- * Club domestic league appearances and goals as of 27 May 2025 ‡ National team caps and goals as of 12 September 2023 (UTC)

Selim Amallah (Berber: ⵙⴰⵍⵉⵎ ⴰⵎⴰⵍⵍⴰⵃ) (Arabic: سليم أملاح; born 15 November 1996) is a professional footballer who plays as a midfielder. Born in Belgium, he plays for Khor Fakkan and the Morocco national team.

== Club career ==
=== Early career ===
Amallah was born in Hautrage, Belgium, to a Moroccan father, Houcine Amallah, and a Belgian mother of Belgian and Italian descent, Antoinette Caufriez. He is a cousin of fellow footballer Maximiliano Caufriez. Amallah began his senior career with Royal Excel Mouscron in 2015. He moved to Tubize in the following year, before returning to Mouscron in 2017.

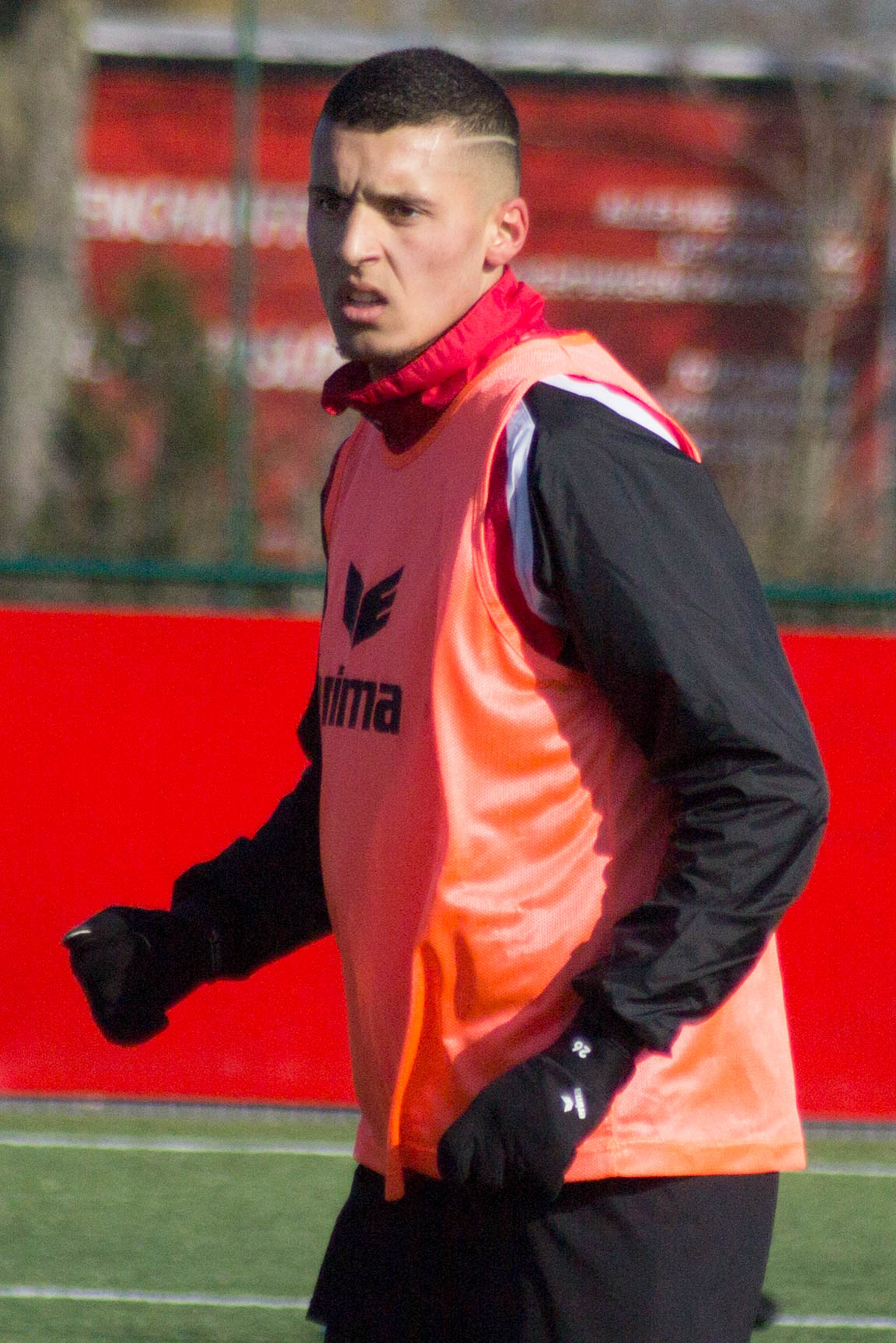
Amallah training with Mouscron in 2018

=== Standard Liège ===
Amallah joined Standard Liège in 2019. On 12 December 2019, he scored Standard's second goal to put the club up on Premier League club Arsenal during the group stage of the Europa League; but Arsenal scored twice in the final 12 minutes to snatch a 2–2 draw. Three days later, he scored in Standard's 1–1 draw against his former club and rivals Anderlecht.

On 1 October 2020, in a UEFA Europa League play-off match against Fehérvár, Amallah scored twice from the penalty-spot to help secure a 3–1 win and qualification to the group stage. In November 2020, he was awarded with the Belgian Lion Award, given to the best player of Arab origin playing in Belgium. He succeeded his compatriot, Mehdi Carcela, who won the previous two editions. On 13 March 2021, he scored the only goal as Standard defeated Eupen to reach the final of the Belgian Cup.

=== Valladolid ===
On 31 January 2023, Amallah signed a four-and-a-half-year contract with La Liga side Real Valladolid. He scored twice in seven appearances during the remainder of the season, as the club suffered relegation.

On 29 August 2023, Amallah moved to Valencia CF in the Spanish top tier on a one-year loan deal. Upon returning, he featured regularly before suffering relegation, and terminated his link with the Blanquivioletas on 1 September 2025.

== International career ==
Amallah was born in Belgium and is of Moroccan and Italian descent. He chose to represent the Morocco national team at the international level and made his competitive debut in a 0–0 draw with Mauritania on 15 November 2019 in qualification match for the 2022 Africa Cup of Nations.

On 9 October 2020, he scored his first goal for the Atlas Lions in a match against Senegal after being set up by Achraf Hakimi. He then provided an assist for Youssef En-Nesyri's goal in the 71st minute as Morocco won 3–1.

On 10 November 2022, he was named in Morocco's 23-man squad for the 2022 FIFA World Cup in Qatar.

== Personal life ==
His mother Antoinette died when he was 14 years old. Amallah has since played every game for her, and honored her at the 2022 FIFA World Cup, where he played an important role for Morocco, eventually reaching the semifinals and finishing the tournament in 4th place.

== Career statistics ==
=== Club ===
As of matches played 15 April 2024

Appearances and goals by club, season and competition
Club	Season	League			Cup		Europe		Other		Total	
Club	Season	Division	Apps	Goals	Apps	Goals	Apps	Goals	Apps	Goals	Apps	Goals
Mouscron	2017–18	Belgian First Division A	21	5	2	0	–		8 (Note: Appearances in Europa League play-offs)	4	31	9
Mouscron	2018–19	Belgian First Division A	19	3	1	0	–		4	2	24	5
Mouscron	Total		40	8	3	0	–		12	6	55	14
Standard Liège	2019–20	Belgian First Division A	25	7	2	0	5 (Note: Appearances in UEFA Europa League)	2	–		32	9
Standard Liège	2020–21	Belgian First Division A	27	10	2	1	6	4	—		35	15
Standard Liège	2021–22	Belgian First Division A	19	3	0	0	—		—		19	3
Standard Liège	2022–23	Belgian First Division A	9	4	—		—		—		9	4
Standard Liège	Total		80	24	4	1	11	6	0	0	95	31
Real Valladolid	2022–23	La Liga	7	2	—		—		–		7	2
Valencia (loan)	2023–24	La Liga	18	0	2	0	—		—		20	0
Career total			145	34	9	1	11	6	12	6	177	47

=== International ===
Scores and results list Morocco's goal tally first, score column indicates score after each Amallah goal.

List of international goals scored by Selim Amallah
No.	Date	Venue	Opponent	Score	Result	Competition
1	9 October 2020	Prince Moulay Abdellah Stadium, Rabat, Morocco	Senegal	1–0	3–1	Friendly
2	12 October 2021	Prince Moulay Abdellah Stadium, Rabat, Morocco	Guinea	2–1	4–1	2022 FIFA World Cup qualification
3	12 October 2021	Prince Moulay Abdellah Stadium, Rabat, Morocco	Guinea	3–1	4–1	2022 FIFA World Cup qualification
4	14 January 2022	Stade Ahmadou Ahidjo, Yaoundé, Cameroon	Comoros	1–0	2–0	2021 Africa Cup of Nations

== Honours ==
Individual

- Mouscron Player of the Year: 2019
- Belgian Lion Award: 2020

Orders

- Order of the Throne: 2022
