= Benjamin Van Durmen =

Belgian footballer

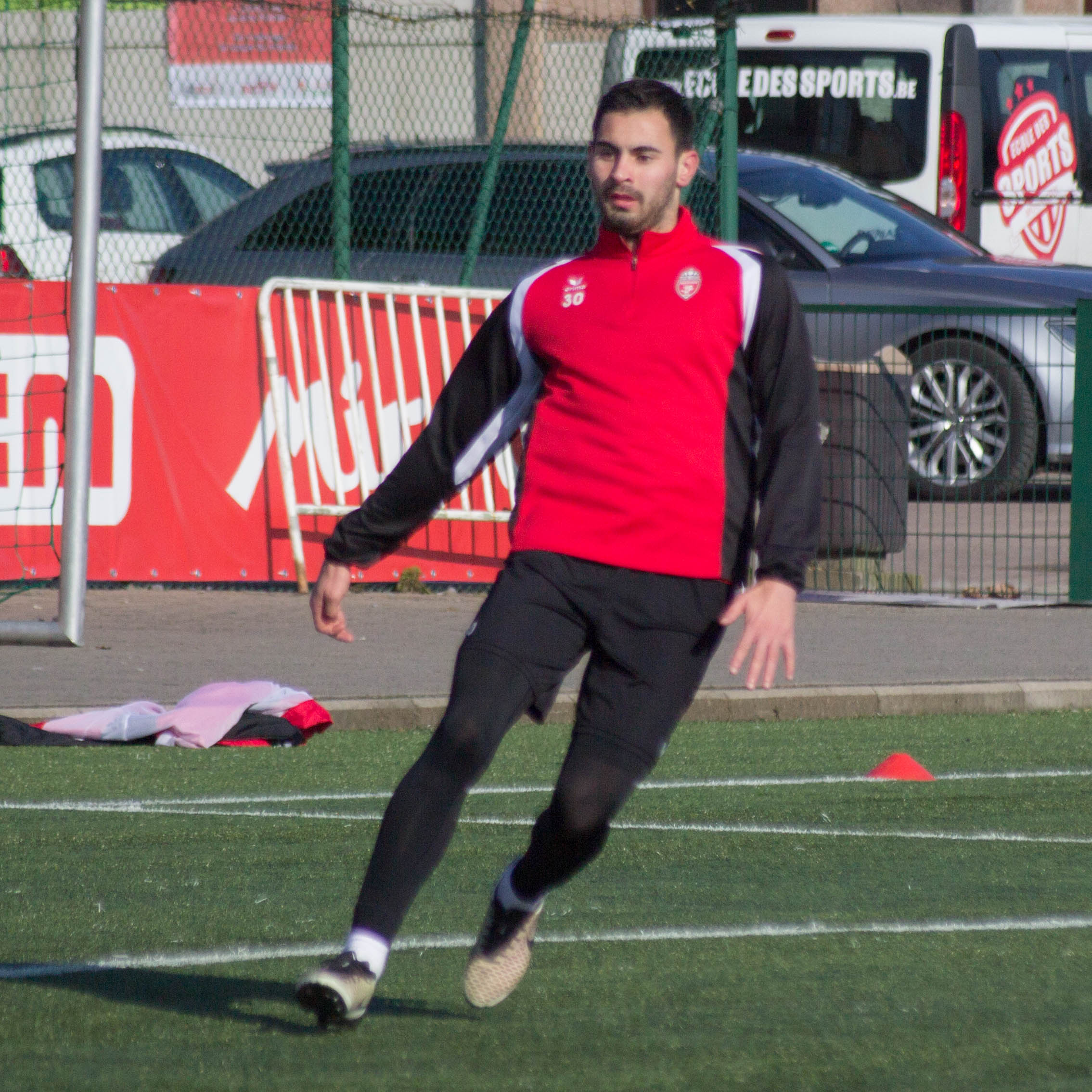

Personal information
- Full name: Benjamin André P Van Durmen
- Date of birth: 20 March 1997 (age 29)
- Place of birth: Tournai, Belgium
- Height: 1.85 m (6 ft 1 in)
- Positions: Midfielder; left-back

Youth career
- 2003–2005: FC Béclers
- 2005–2012: RFC Tournai
- 2012–2016: Mouscron-Péruwelz

Senior career*
Years	Team	Apps	(Gls)
2016–2021	Royal Excel Mouscron	91	(3)
2021–2024	FC U Craiova	76	(8)
2024–2026	UTA Arad	57	(2)
- * Club domestic league appearances and goals as of 18 May 2026

Benjamin André P Van Durmen (born 20 March 1997) is a Belgian professional footballer who plays as a midfielder or left-back.

== Club career ==
Benjamin Van Durmen started his career with Mouscron.

On 10 August 2021, he signed with FC U Craiova in Romania. On 13 May 2024, a day after the club's relegation to the second division was confirmed, Van Durmen and FC U Craiova mutually agreed to terminate his contract.
