= Fabrice Olinga =

Cameroonian footballer (born 1996)

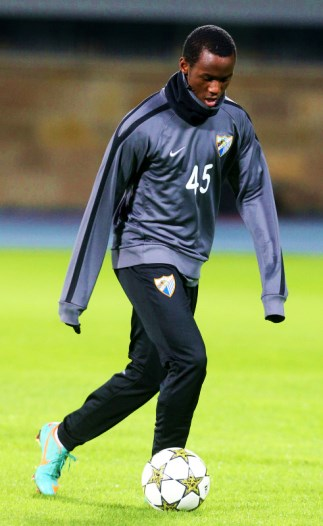
- Olinga with Málaga in 2014

Personal information
- Full name: Fabrice Olinga Essono
- Date of birth: 12 May 1996 (age 30)
- Place of birth: Douala, Cameroon
- Height: 1.76 m (5 ft 9 in)
- Position: Forward

Youth career
- 2007–2009: Samuel Eto'o Academy
- 2009–2011: Mallorca
- 2011–2013: Málaga

Senior career*
Years	Team	Apps	(Gls)
2012–2013	Málaga B	21	(1)
2012–2014	Málaga	10	(1)
2014–2015	Apollon Limassol	1	(0)
2014	→ Zulte Waregem (loan)	7	(0)
2015	Sampdoria	0	(0)
2015	→ Viitorul Constanța (loan)	0	(0)
2015–2021	Mouscron	121	(6)
2021–2022	Rio Ave	6	(0)
2023–2024	Botoșani	8	(0)

International career
2012–2020	Cameroon	20	(1)
- * Club domestic league appearances and goals as of 12 November 2023

Fabrice Olinga Essono (born 12 May 1996), known as Olinga, is a Cameroonian professional footballer who plays as a forward.

He became the youngest ever player to score in La Liga at the age of 16, at the service of Málaga. Released shortly after, he went on to compete professionally in Belgium, Cyprus, Romania and Portugal.

Olinga represented Cameroon at the 2014 World Cup.

== Early years ==
Born in Douala, Olinga started learning football in the "Samuel Eto'o Foundation" in Cameroon. He arrived in Spain in 2009, joining the youth ranks of RCD Mallorca.

Two years later, Olinga was spotted by Málaga CF's academy director, Manuel Casanova, who invited him to join the club. He played a crucial part in the Andalusians' side that reached the final of Copa del Rey Juvenil de Fútbol in 2012; however, he himself missed the decisive game against RCD Espanyol (1–0 loss) due to suspension.

== Club career ==
At the age of only 16, Olinga was called up by first-team manager Manuel Pellegrini for the 2012–13 opener, away against RC Celta de Vigo: he came on as a 60th-minute substitute for Sebastián Fernández, and went on to score the game's only goal, becoming La Liga's youngest ever goalscorer at 16 years and 98 days, beating the previous record holder Iker Muniain by 191 days; his record stood until 8 October 2023, when Lamine Yamal broke it by 11 days.

Olinga started again four days later, appearing in a 2–0 win over Panathinaikos F.C. in that season's UEFA Champions League and playing 70 minutes. On 20 January 2014, he cut ties with Málaga – after rejecting the offer for a revised and improved contract counseled by his agent Pini Zahavi– and joined Apollon Limassol FC from the Cypriot First Division, being immediately loaned to S.V. Zulte Waregem for five months with an option to make the move permanently afterwards.

In February 2015, Apollon loaned Olinga to Romania's FC Viitorul Constanța, with the transfer being superseded by UC Sampdoria who had too many non-European Union players in its ranks. On 11 April of the following year, his compatriot Eto'o called a press conference in which he announced he was taking the Italian club to court for what he perceived as an unfair treatment of Olinga, going as far as claiming both signings were related.

In the summer of 2015, Sampdoria renounced his rights on Olinga and he signed a two-year deal at Royal Mouscron-Péruwelz. He hardly got a game during his early stint in the Belgian Pro League, his second goal as a professional only arriving on 30 September 2017 in a 2–2 home draw against KV Mechelen.

After leaving, Olinga represented Rio Ave FC (Liga Portugal 2) and FC Botoșani (Romanian Liga I).

== International career ==
On 2 October 2012, Olinga was called by the Cameroon national team for a 2013 Africa Cup of Nations qualification match against Cape Verde, and he scored on his debut on the 14th (2–1 win). He was selected by coach Volker Finke for his 2014 FIFA World Cup squad at the age of 18, being the youngest player in the competition but remaining an unused member as the tournament ended in group stage exit.

=== International statistics ===
Cameroon
Year	Apps	Goals
2012	2	1
2013	3	0
2014	3	0
2015	0	0
2016	0	0
2017	4	0
2018	5	0
2019	2	0
2020	1	0
Total	20	1

Scores and results list Cameroon's goal tally first, score column indicates score after each Olinga goal.

#	Date	Venue	Opponent	Score	Result	Competition
1.	14 October 2012	Ahmadou Ahidjo, Yaoundé, Cameroon	Cape Verde	2–1	2–1	2013 Africa Cup of Nations qualification

== Honours ==
Zulte Waregem

- Belgian Cup runner-up: 2013–14

Rio Ave

- Liga Portugal 2: 2021–22
