= Alessandro Ciranni =

Belgian footballer (born 1996)

Personal information
- Date of birth: 28 June 1996 (age 30)
- Place of birth: Genk, Belgium
- Height: 1.72 m (5 ft 8 in)
- Position: Right-back

Team information
- Current team: Willem II
- Number: 2

Youth career
- 2003–2015: Genk

Senior career*
| Years | Team | Apps | (Gls) |
| 2016 | Genk | 0 | (0) |
| 2016 | → MVV (loan) | 10 | (0) |
| 2016–2018 | MVV | 76 | (8) |
| 2018–2019 | Fortuna Sittard | 17 | (0) |
| 2019–2021 | Mouscron | 49 | (3) |
| 2021–2024 | Zulte Waregem | 75 | (3) |
| 2024–2025 | Gloria Buzău | 27 | (0) |
| 2025– | Willem II | 19 | (0) |

International career
| 2014 | Belgium U19 | 4 | (0) |
- * Club domestic league appearances and goals as of 28 April 2026

Alessandro Ciranni (born 28 June 1996) is a Belgian professional footballer who plays as a right-back for Eredivisie club Willem II.

== Club career ==
Ciranni was born in Genk, Belgium. After spending half a season on loan at Eerste Divisie side MVV from his parent club Genk, he signed a two-year contract with the South Limburgers in summer 2016.

A free-kick specialist possessing a Belgian, Dutch and Italian passport, Ciranni then joined newly promoted Fortuna Sittard from their provincial rivals in summer 2018.

He joined Belgian side, Royal Excel Mouscron in July 2019.

In June 2021, he signed a three-year contract with Zulte Waregem.

On 1 September 2025, Ciranni returned to the Netherlands and signed a one-season contract with Willem II.

== Personal life ==
Born in Belgium, Ciranni is of Italian descent.
