= Dimitri Mohamed =

French footballer (born 1989)

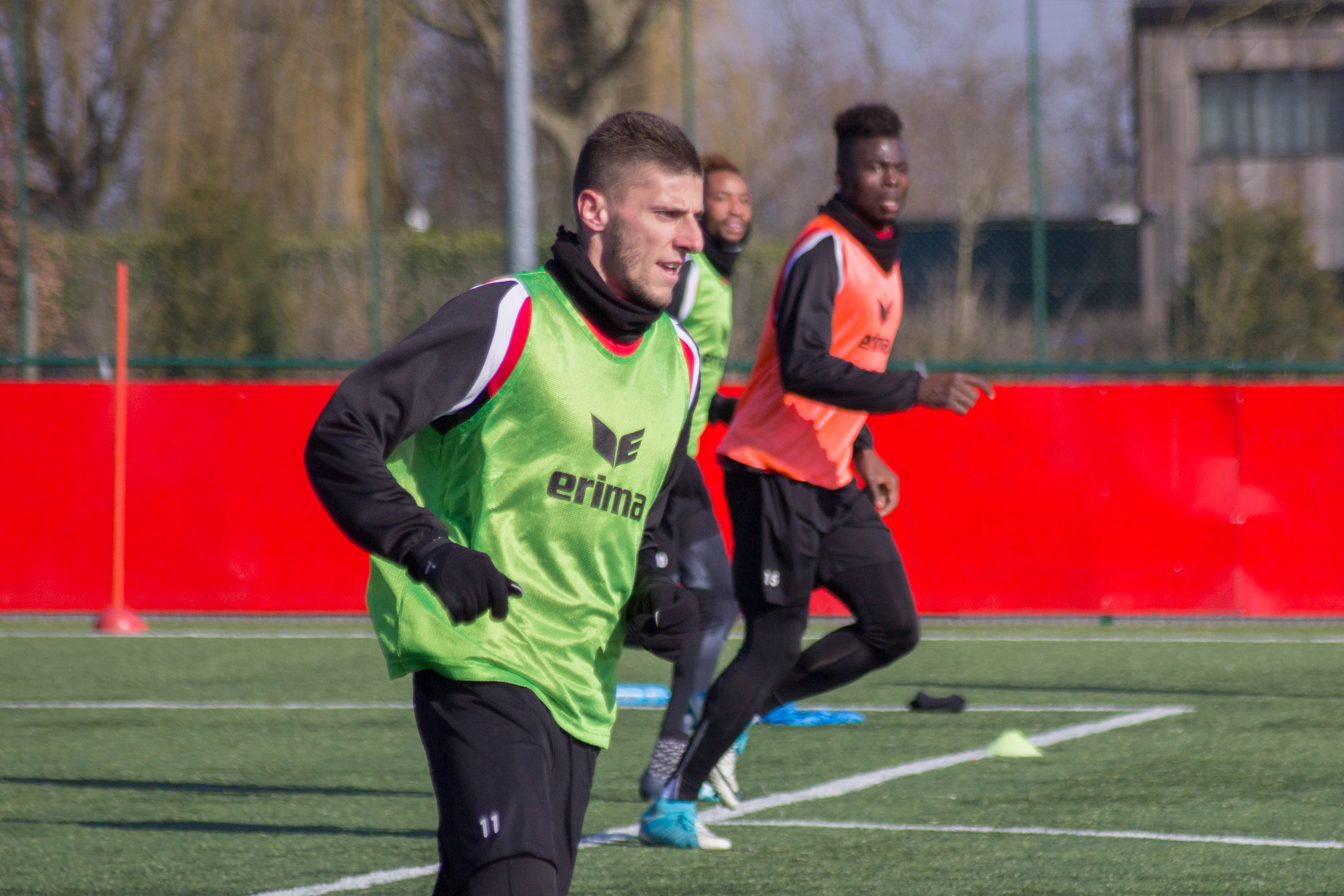
- Mohamed training with Mouscron in 2018

Personal information
- Date of birth: 11 June 1989 (age 37)
- Place of birth: Bully-les-Mines, France
- Height: 1.82 m (6 ft 0 in)
- Positions: Centre-back; midfielder

Team information
- Current team: IC Croix

Senior career*
| Years | Team | Apps | (Gls) |
| 2009–2010 | Calonne Lievin | | |
| 2010–2012 | Amiens | 17 | (0) |
| 2012–2022 | Mouscron | 212 | (12) |
| 2022–2024 | Francs Borains | 34 | (1) |
| 2024 | Winkel Sport | 14 | (2) |
| 2024– | IC Croix | 2 | (0) |
- * Club domestic league appearances and goals as of 7 December 2024

Dimitri Mohamed (born 11 June 1989) is a French professional footballer who plays as a centre-back or midfielder for Championnat National 3 club IC Croix.

== Career ==
Mohamed spent a long time at Belgian club Mouscron. By August 2020, he had experienced nine different coaches, hundreds of players and five majority shareholders at the club. By February 2021, he had made 214 appearances.

After Mouscron went bankrupt in 2022, Mohamed moved to Francs Borains.

== Personal life ==
Mohamed was born in France, and is of Somali descent through his grandfather.
