= Joachim Carcela =

Belgian footballer (born 1999)

Personal information
- Full name: Joachim Carcela-Gonzalez
- Date of birth: 16 December 1999 (age 26)
- Place of birth: Ostend, Belgium
- Height: 1.81 m (5 ft 11 in)
- Position: Midfielder

Team information
- Current team: Krumovgrad
- Number: 8

Youth career
- –2015: Standard Liège
- 2015–2016: Anderlecht
- 2017–2018: Club Brugge
- 2018–2019: Standard Liège

Senior career*
Years	Team	Apps	(Gls)
2019–2021	Standard Liège	2	(0)
2021–2022	Mouscron	20	(5)
2022–2023	Deinze	19	(2)
2024–2025	Etar	14	(3)
2025–	Krumovgrad	11	(0)
- * Club domestic league appearances and goals as of 26 June 2025

Joachim Carcela-Gonzalez (born 16 December 1999) is a Belgian professional footballer who plays as a midfielder for Bulgarian First League club Krumovgrad.

== Career ==
On 6 June 2019, Carcela signed his first professional contract with Standard Liège. Carcela made his professional debut for Standard Liège in a 2–0 Belgian First Division A win over Waasland-Beveren on 30 October 2019. He finished his two seasons with Standard Liège with only 2 league appearances, but he played in three games of the 2020–21 UEFA Europa League group stage, appearing in both games against Benfica and the away game against Lech Poznań.

On 29 July 2021, he signed a two-year contract with Mouscron. On 2 October 2021, he scored his first professional goal, opening the score in the game against Lierse Kempenzonen in the 1st minute of the game. He also received his first red card in the same game, in the 87th minute, for a serious foul.

On 7 September 2023, Carcela's contract with Deinze was terminated by mutual consent. In January 2025, he signed a contract with Bulgarian First League club Krumovgrad.

== Personal life ==
Carcela was born in Belgium and is Spanish descent. Carcela is the cousin of the Moroccan international footballer, Mehdi Carcela.
