= Stade Le Canonnier =

Football stadium in Mouscron, Belgium

Coordinates: 50°44′02″N 3°12′40″E

Le Canonnier
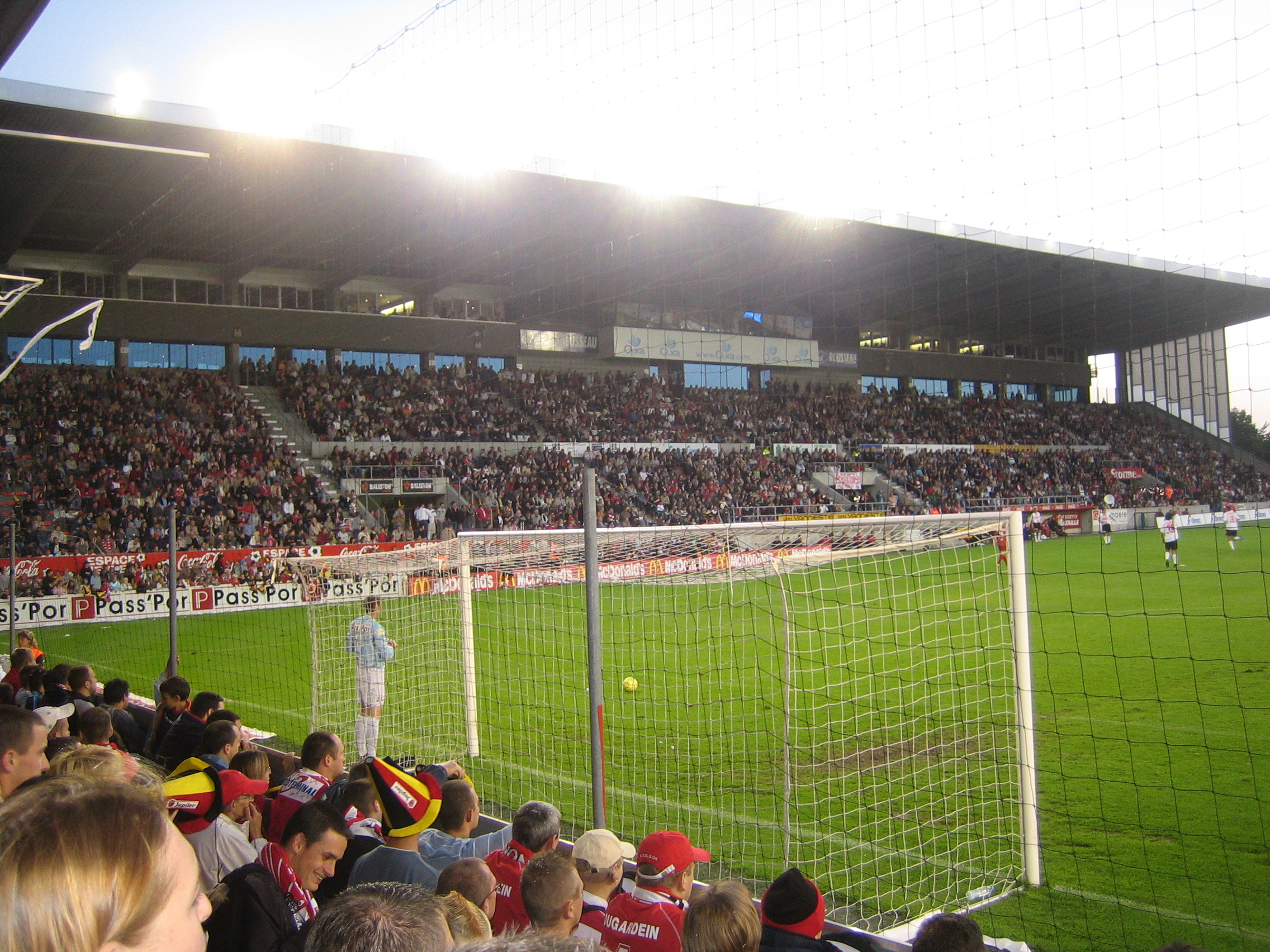
- Interactive map of Le Canonnier
- Location: Mouscron, Belgium
- Capacity: 10,800
- Surface: Grass

Construction
- Opened: 1930
- Renovated: 1999

Tenants
- Royal Excelsior Mouscron (1932–2009); Royal Excel Mouscron (2010–2022); Stade Mouscronnois (2022–present)

Le Canonnier is a multi-use stadium in Mouscron, Belgium. It is currently used mostly for football matches and was the home ground of Royal Excel Mouscron until the club was folded in 2022. The stadium holds 10,800 people.
