= 2024–25 Standard Liège season =

Standard Liège
2024–25 season
- Manager: Ivan Leko
- Stadium: Stade Maurice Dufrasne
- Belgian Pro League: 7th
- Europe play-offs: 5th
- Belgian Cup: Eighth round
- Top goalscorer: League: Andi Zeqiri (9); All: Andi Zeqiri (10)
- Average home league attendance: 14,859
Home colours

The 2024–25 season was the 127th season in the history of Standard Liège, and the club's 65th consecutive season in the Belgian Pro League. In addition to the domestic league, the club participated in the Belgian Cup.

== Transfers ==
=== In ===
| Pos. | Player | Transferred from | Fee | Date | Source |
|---|---|---|---|---|---|
| FW | (Netherlands) Noah Ohio | (England) Hull City | Loan return | 30 June 2024 | |
| MF | (Croatia) Marko Bulat | (Croatia) Dinamo Zagreb | Loan | 2 July 2024 | |
| DF | (France) Grejohn Kyei | (France) Clermont Foot | Free | 3 July 2024 | |
| DF | (Belgium) Boli Bolingoli | (Belgium) KV Mechelen | Free | 5 July 2024 | |
| DF | (Croatia) Boško Šutalo | (Croatia) Dinamo Zagreb | Free | 8 July 2024 | |
| MF | (France) Ibrahim Karamoko | (France) Versailles | €150,000 | 6 January 2025 | |

=== Out ===
| Pos. | Player | Transferred to | Fee | Date | Source |
|---|---|---|---|---|---|
| FW | (Romania) Denis Drăguș | (Turkey) Trabzonspor | €1,700,000 | 1 July 2024 | |
| FW | (Netherlands) Noah Ohio | (Netherlands) FC Utrecht | €1,500,000 | 8 July 2024 | |
| MF | (Mali) Moussa Djenepo | (Turkey) Antalyaspor | Loan | 12 July 2024 | |
| MF | (Democratic Republic of the Congo) William Balikwisha | (Belgium) OH Leuven | €600,000 | 20 July 2024 | |

== Friendlies ==
=== Pre-season ===
| 29 June 2024 Friendly | Aubel FC (Belgium) | 0–5 | (Belgium) Standard Liège | Aubel |
| | | | | Stadium: Stade Jean-Marie Doome |

| 13 July 2024 Friendly | NEC Nijmegen (Netherlands) | 1–2 | (Belgium) Standard Liège | Nijmegen, Netherlands |
| 16:00 | Olden Larsen 24' | | Bolingoli 12'; Gboua 72' | Stadium: Goffertstadion |

| 20 July 2024 Friendly | Standard Liège (Belgium) | 1–1 | (England) Norwich City | Liège |
| 15:00 | Hautekiet 14' | | Sainz 9' | Stadium: Stade Maurice Dufrasne |

== Competitions ==
=== Overall record ===
| Competition | First match | Last match | Starting round | Record | | | | | | | |
| Competition | First match | Last match | Starting round | Pld | W | D | L | GF | GA | GD | Win % |
|---|---|---|---|---|---|---|---|---|---|---|---|
| Belgian Pro League regular season | 28 July 2024 | 14–16 March 2025 | Matchday 1 | 7 | 3 | 2 | 2 | 4 | 3 | +1 | 42.86 |
| Belgian Cup | | | | 0 | 0 | 0 | 0 | 0 | 0 | +0 | — |
| Total | | | | 7 | 3 | 2 | 2 | 4 | 3 | +1 | 42.86 |

Last updated: 13 September 2024
Source: Soccerway

=== Belgian Pro League ===
==== Regular season ====
| Pos | Team | Pld | W | D | L | GF | GA | GD | Pts | Qualification or relegation |
|---|---|---|---|---|---|---|---|---|---|---|
| 5 | Antwerp | 30 | 12 | 10 | 8 | 47 | 32 | +15 | 46 | Qualification for the Champions' play-offs |
| 6 | Gent | 30 | 11 | 12 | 7 | 41 | 33 | +8 | 45 | Qualification for the Champions' play-offs |
| 7 | Standard Liège | 30 | 10 | 9 | 11 | 22 | 35 | −13 | 39 | Qualification for the Europe play-offs |
| 8 | Mechelen | 30 | 10 | 8 | 12 | 45 | 40 | +5 | 38 | Qualification for the Europe play-offs |
| 9 | Westerlo | 30 | 10 | 7 | 13 | 50 | 49 | +1 | 37 | Qualification for the Europe play-offs |

Source: Jupiler Pro League (in Dutch), Soccerway
Rules for classification: 1) Points; 2) Matches won; 3) Goal difference; 4) Goals scored; 5) Away matches won; 6) Away goal difference; 7) Away goals scored; 8) Play-off.

==== Results summary ====
| Overall | | | | | | | | Home | | | | | | Away | | | | | |
| Pld | W | D | L | GF | GA | GD | Pts | W | D | L | GF | GA | GD | W | D | L | GF | GA | GD |
|---|---|---|---|---|---|---|---|---|---|---|---|---|---|---|---|---|---|---|---|
| 30 | 10 | 9 | 11 | 22 | 35 | −13 | 39 | 7 | 4 | 4 | 12 | 10 | +2 | 3 | 5 | 7 | 10 | 25 | −15 |

Last updated: 19 January 2025.

==== Regular season ====
| Round | 1 | 2 | 3 | 4 | 5 | 6 | 7 | 8 | 9 | 10 | 11 | 12 | 13 | 14 | 15 | 16 | 17 | 18 | 19 | 20 | 21 | 22 | 23 | 24 | 25 | 26 | 27 | 28 | 29 | 30 |
|---|---|---|---|---|---|---|---|---|---|---|---|---|---|---|---|---|---|---|---|---|---|---|---|---|---|---|---|---|---|---|
| Ground | A | H | H | A | H | A | A | H | H | A | H | A | H | A | H | A | H | A | H | A | H | A | H | A | A | H | A | H | A | H |
| Result | D | W | D | L | W | L | W | D | L | L | W | L | W | L | W | D | D | D | L | D | W | W | W | D | L | L | W | L | L | D |
| Position | 7 | 6 | 7 | 11 | 7 | 10 | 7 | 7 | 9 | 11 | 10 | 11 | 8 | 9 | 8 | 8 | 8 | 8 | 10 | 11 | 8 | 7 | 6 | 7 | 7 | 7 | 7 | 7 | 7 | 7 |

Updated to match(es) played on 16 March 2025. Source: Worldfootball
A = Away; H = Home; W = Win; D = Draw; L = Loss

==== Matches ====
The match schedule was released on 11 June 2024.

| 28 July 2024 1 | Genk | 0–0 | Standard Liège | Genk |
| 13:30 | | | | Stadium: Cegeka Arena; Referee: Lothar D'hondt |

| 4 August 2024 2 | Standard Liège | 1–0 | Club Brugge | Liège |
| 18:30 | Bulat 64' | | Mechele (yellow card) 72'; Jutglà (yellow card) 89' | Stadium: Stade Maurice Dufrasne; Referee: Lawrence Visser |

| 9 August 2024 3 | Standard Liège | 0–0 | Mechelen | Liège |
| 20:45 | | | | Stadium: Stade Maurice Dufrasne |

| 18 August 2024 4 | Kortrijk | 1–0 | Standard Liège | Kortrijk |
| 18:30 CET | Ambrose 67'; Kaneko (yellow card) 78' | Report | Lawrence (red card) 35'; Hautekiet (yellow card) 70' | Stadium: Guldensporen Stadion; Attendance: 7,345; Referee: (Belgium) Bert Put |

| 25 August 2024 5 | Standard Liège | 1–0 | Beerschot | Liège |
| 18:30 CET | Benjdida 72' (pen.) | Report | Plat (red card) 60'; Michez (yellow card) 69'; Cagro (yellow card) 78' | Stadium: Stade Maurice Dufrasne; Attendance: 16,882; Referee: (Belgium) Jasper Vergoote |

| 31 August 2024 6 | OH Leuven | 2–0 | Standard Liège | Heverlee |
| 20:45 CET | Verstraete (yellow card) 14'; Ominami (yellow card) 23'; N'Dri 32' (yellow card) 49'; Ricca (yellow card) 60'; Fossey 63' (o.g.) | Report | Šutalo (yellow card) 66'; Ngoy (yellow card) 79'; Price (yellow card) 87'; Lawrence (yellow card) 90+2' | Stadium: King Power at Den Dreef; Attendance: 8,155; Referee: (Belgium) Kevin Van Damme |

| 13 September 2024 7 | Dender | 0–2 | Standard Liège | Denderleeuw |
| 20:45 CET | Rodes (yellow card) 17'; Nsimba (yellow card) 87' | Report | Benjdida 9' (pen.); Zeqiri 65'; Bulat (yellow card) 76'; Šutalo (yellow card) 87' | Stadium: Dender Football Complex; Attendance: 4,000; Referee: (Belgium) Wim Smet |

| 20 September 2024 8 | Standard Liège | 0–0 | Union Saint-Gilloise | Liège |
| 20:45 CET | Šutalo (yellow card) 84' | Report | Sadiki (yellow card) 83' | Stadium: Stade Maurice Dufrasne; Attendance: 18,983; Referee: (Belgium) Jan Boterberg |

| 28 September 2024 9 | Standard Liège | 1–2 | Westerlo | Liège |
| 18:15 CET | Zeqiri 63' (pen.); O'Neill (yellow card) 67' | Report | Frigan 6' 64' (yellow card) 75'; Haspolat (yellow card) 45'; Bos (yellow card) 53'; Bolat (yellow card) 61'; Alcócer (yellow card) 66'; Sayyadmanesh (yellow card) 81'; Devine (yellow card) 90+5' | Stadium: Stade Maurice Dufrasne; Attendance: 15,294; Referee: (Belgium) Bram Van Driessche |

| 6 October 2024 10 | Anderlecht | 3–0 | Standard Liège | Brussels |
| 13:30 CET | Simić 9' (yellow card) 83'; Dolberg 30'; Dreyer 90+2'; Sardella (yellow card) 90+5' | Report | Hautekiet (yellow card) 54' | Stadium: Lotto Park; Attendance: 21,900; Referee: (Belgium) Lothar D'Hondt |

| 20 October 2024 11 | Standard Liège | 2–1 | Charleroi | Liège |
| 18:30 CET | O'Neill (yellow card) 23'; Eckert 40'; Šutalo 45+5'; Benjdida (yellow card) 81' | Report | Heymans (yellow card) 62'; Oday Dabbagh (yellow card) 90+2'; Mbenza 90+5' | Stadium: Stade Maurice Dufrasne; Attendance: 22,238; Referee: (Belgium) Erik Lambrechts |

| 27 October 2024 12 | Antwerp | 3–0 | Standard Liège | Deurne |
| 16:00 CET | Costa (yellow card) 35'; Janssen 45'; Valencia (yellow card) 60'; Chery 63'; Ondrejka 90+8' | Report | Šutalo (yellow card) 75'; Lawrence (yellow card) 87' | Stadium: Bosuilstadion; Attendance: 15,000; Referee: (Belgium) Nathan Verboomen |

| 2 November 2024 13 | Standard Liège | 2–1 | Sint-Truiden | Liège |
| 16:00 CET | Zeqiri 33' 45' (pen.); Fossey (yellow card) 83' | Report | Van Helden (yellow card) 44'; Dumont 70'; Brahimi (yellow card) 80'; Bertaccini (yellow card) 90'; Delpupo (yellow card) 90+4' | Stadium: Stade Maurice Dufrasne; Attendance: 16,358; Referee: (Belgium) Kevin Van Damme |

| 10 November 2024 14 | Gent | 5–0 | Standard Liège | Ghent |
| 16:00 CET | Watanabe 5'; Dean 41' 59'; Brown 51'; Gilles De Meyer 89' | Report | Alexandropoulos (yellow card) 11' | Stadium: Planet Group Arena; Attendance: 16,283; Referee: (Belgium) Lawrence Visser |

| 23 November 2024 15 | Standard Liège | 1–0 | Cercle Brugge | Liège |
| 18:15 CET | Zeqiri 57' | Report | Flávio Nazinho (yellow card) 6'; Denkey (yellow card) 42' | Stadium: Stade Maurice Dufrasne; Attendance: 14,453; Referee: (Belgium) Simon Bourdeaud'hui |

| 30 November 2024 16 | Charleroi | 1–1 | Standard Liège | Charleroi |
| 20:45 CET | Guiagon (yellow card) 45+3'; Oday Dabbagh 90+4' | Report | Kuavita 36'; Šutalo (yellow card) 70'; Fossey (yellow card) 90+3' | Stadium: Stade du Pays de Charleroi; Attendance: 11,793; Referee: (Belgium) Jasper Vergoote |

| 7 December 2024 17 | Standard Liège | 1–1 | OH Leuven | Liège |
| 18:15 CET | Camara (yellow card) 15'; Zeqiri 45'; O'Neill (yellow card) 83'; Bolingoli (yellow card) 90+3' | Report | Kuruçay (yellow card) 45+3'; Maziz (yellow card) 58'; Akimoto (yellow card) 83'; Ricca 90+4' | Stadium: Stade Maurice Dufrasne; Attendance: 12,658; Referee: (Belgium) Lawrence Visser |

| 14 December 2024 18 | Beerschot | 0–0 | Standard Liège | Antwerp |
| 16:00 CET | | Report | Hautekiet (yellow card) 14'; Bolingoli (yellow card) 65' | Stadium: Olympisch Stadion; Attendance: 5,596; Referee: (Belgium) Nathan Verboomen |

| 22 December 2024 19 | Standard Liège | 0–1 | Gent | Liège |
| 16:00 CET | O'Neill (yellow card) 30'; Bulat (yellow card) 33'; Kuavita (yellow card) 60' | Report | Surdez (yellow card) 46' (goal) 82'; Roef (yellow card) 90+4'; Dean (yellow card) 90+7' | Stadium: Stade Maurice Dufrasne; Attendance: 20,135; Referee: (Belgium) Jasper Vergoote |

| 26 December 2024 20 | Mechelen | 0–0 | Standard Liège | Mechelen |
| 18:30 CET | Touba (yellow card) 28'; Mrabti (yellow card) 44'; Raemaekers (yellow card) 79' | Report | Eckert (yellow card) 44'; Alexandropoulos (yellow card) 59' | Stadium: AFAS Stadion; Attendance: 15,895; Referee: (Belgium) Jan Boterberg |

| 10 January 2025 21 | Standard Liège | 1–0 | Kortrijk | Liège |
| 20:45 CET | Eckert 50'; Camara (yellow card) 90+1'; Price (yellow card) 90+2' | Report | Nacho Ferri (yellow card) 59'; Sissako (yellow card) 90+1'; Messaoudi (yellow card) 90+5' | Stadium: Stade Maurice Dufrasne; Attendance: 12,642; Referee: (Belgium) Kevin Van Damme |

| 19 January 2025 22 | Sint-Truiden | 1–2 | Standard Liège | Sint-Truiden |
| 18:30 CET | Ogawa 2' (yellow card) 27' | Report | Dierckx (yellow card) 12'; Zeqiri 42' (pen.); Eckert 62'; Karamoko (yellow card) 75'; Alexandropoulos (yellow card) 90+1' | Stadium: Daio Wasabi Stayen Stadium; Attendance: 6,206; Referee: (Belgium) Nicolas Laforge |

| 26 January 2025 23 | Standard Liège | 1–0 | Dender | Liège |
| 13:30 CET | Zeqiri 3' (pen.); Karamoko (yellow card) 78' | Report | Berte (yellow card) 26'; Květ (yellow card) 30'; Cools (yellow card) 47' | Stadium: Stade Maurice Dufrasne; Attendance: 15,711; Referee: (Belgium) Nathan Verboomen |

| 1 February 2025 24 | Cercle Brugge | 1–1 | Standard Liège | Brugge |
| 18:15 CET | Van der Bruggen (yellow card) 27'; Nazinho 64' | Report | Lawrence (yellow card) 50'; Karamoko (yellow card) 73'; Lazare 90+8' | Stadium: Jan Breydel Stadium; Attendance: 6,836; Referee: (Belgium) Wim Smet |

| 9 February 2025 25 | Westerlo | 4–2 | Standard Liège | Westerlo |
| 18:30 CET | Reynolds (yellow card) 14'; Sakamoto 17'; Frigan 31'; Rommens (yellow card) 45+2'; Haspolat 46'; Slimani 89' | Report | Karamoko (yellow card) 8'; Eckert 10'; Hountondji 90+3' | Stadium: Het Kuipje; Referee: (Belgium) Bert Put |

| 14 February 2025 26 | Standard Liège | 1–2 | Genk | Liège |
| 20:45 CET | Šutalo (yellow card) 46'; Eckert 90+8' (pen.) | Report | Baah 35'; Bangoura (yellow card) 56'; Arokodare 78'; Penders (yellow card) 89' (yellow-red card) 90+4' | Stadium: Stade Maurice Dufrasne; Attendance: 19,619; Referee: (Belgium) Jan Boterberg |

| 23 February 2025 27 | Club Brugge | 1–2 | Standard Liège | Brugge |
| 13:30 CET | Vanaken (yellow card) 31'; Tzolis (yellow card) 39' (yellow-red card) 55'; Jutglà 51' | Report | Alexandropoulos (yellow card) 32'; Zeqiri 67' (pen.); Hautekiet (yellow card) 76'; Eckert 85' (yellow card) 88'; Lazare (yellow card) 87' | Stadium: Jan Breydel Stadium; Attendance: 24,163; Referee: (Belgium) Lawrence Visser |

| 2 March 2025 28 | Standard Liège | 0–2 | Anderlecht | Liège |
| 18:30 CET | | Report | Hazard (yellow card) 48' (goal) 63'; Augustinsson (yellow card) 83'; Simić (yellow card) 85'; Angulo (yellow card) 88' | Stadium: Stade Maurice Dufrasne; Attendance: 23,675; Referee: (Belgium) Jasper Vergoote |

| 9 March 2025 29 | Union Saint-Gilloise | 3–0 | Standard Liège | Brussels |
| 19:15 CET | David 20' 55'; Burgess (yellow card) 43'; Rasmussen (yellow card) 51'; Ivanović 82' | Report | O'Neill (yellow card) 56' (yellow-red card) 59'; Lawrence (yellow card) 77' | Stadium: Joseph Marien Stadium; Attendance: 7,464; Referee: (Belgium) Lothar D'hondt |

| 16 March 2025 30 | Standard Liège | 0–0 | Antwerp | Liège |
| 13:30 CET | Bolingoli (yellow card) 90+5' | Report | Benítez (yellow card) 19'; Janssen (yellow card) 22'; Deman (yellow card) 87'; Doumbia (yellow card) 90+1' | Stadium: Stade Maurice Dufrasne; Attendance: 13,865; Referee: (Belgium) Bram Van Driessche |

=== Europe play-offs ===
| Round | 1 | 2 | 3 | 4 | 5 | 6 | 7 | 8 | 9 | 10 |
|---|---|---|---|---|---|---|---|---|---|---|
| Ground | H | A | A | H | H | A | H | A | H | A |
| Result | D | L | D | D | L | | | | | |
| Position | 1 | 3 | 3 | 3 | 6 | | | | | |

Updated to match(es) played on 24 April 2025. Source: Worldfootball
A = Away; H = Home; W = Win; D = Draw; L = Loss

| 29 March 2025 1 | Standard Liège | 2–2 | Mechelen | Liège |
| 18:15 CET | Hountondji 21'; Lazare 21' | Report | Pflücke 33'; Vanrafelghem 68'; Touba (yellow card) 80' | Stadium: Stade Maurice Dufrasne; Attendance: 7,379; Referee: (Belgium) Wim Smet |

| 23 February 2025 2 | Charleroi | 1–0 | Standard Liège | Charleroi |
| 19:15 CET | Bernier 44'; Mbenza (yellow card) 60' | Report | Camara (yellow card) 52' | Stadium: Stade du Pays de Charleroi; Attendance: 8,524; Referee: (Belgium) Nathan Verboomen |

| 2 March 2025 3 | Dender | 1–1 | Standard Liège | Denderleeuw |
| 19:15 CET | Rodes (yellow card) 17'; Berte 42' | Report | Hountondji 25' | Stadium: Dender Football Complex; Attendance: 2,541; Referee: (Belgium) Bert Verbeke |

| 9 March 2025 4 | Standard Liège | 1–1 | Westerlo | Liège |
| 20:45 CET | Eckert 20'; Calut (yellow card) 90+2' | Report | Haspolat (yellow card) 38'; Piedfort (yellow card) 54'; Sydorchuk 87' | Stadium: Stade Maurice Dufrasne; Attendance: 7,718; Referee: (Belgium) Wesli De Cremer |

| 16 March 2025 5 | Standard Liège | 0–1 | OH Leuven | Liège |
| 20:30 CET | Karamoko (yellow card) 45+1' | Report | Maziz (yellow card) 47'; George (yellow card) 50'; Verlinden 78'; Ōhata (yellow card) 86' | Stadium: Stade Maurice Dufrasne; Attendance: 7,012; Referee: (Belgium) Kevin Van Damme |

=== Belgian Cup ===
| 30 October 2024 Seventh Round | Standard Liège | 3-2 (a.e.t.) | Lyra-Lierse Berlaar | Liège |
| 20:30 CET | Kuavita 16' (yellow card) 88'; Eckert 40'; O'Neill 102' | Report | Seppe Kil 23'; Jordy Peffer 32' (yellow card) 35'; Lennert Versmissen (yellow card) 49'; Maxim Volant (yellow card) 65'; Sebbe Augustijns (yellow card) 70'; Cel Teunen (yellow card) 111' | Stadium: Stade Maurice Dufrasne; Attendance: 8,877; Referee: (Belgium) Tim De Keyzer |

| 4 December 2024 Eighth Round | Genk | 2-1 (a.e.t.) | Standard Liège | Genk |
| 20:30 CET | Karetsas (yellow card) 34'; Bangoura (yellow card) 49'; Arokodare 72'; Hrošovský 115'; Sattlberger (yellow card) 118' | Report | O'Neill (yellow card) 39'; Zeqiri 65' | Stadium: Cegeka Arena; Attendance: 11,116; Referee: (Belgium) Nicolas Laforge |

== Statistics ==
=== Appearances and goals ===
| No. | Pos | Nat | Player | Total | | Belgian Pro League | | Belgian Cup | |
| No. | Pos | Nat | Player | Apps | Goals | Apps | Goals | Apps | Goals |
Goalkeepers
| 16 | GK | (Belgium) BEL | Arnaud Bodart | 0 | 0 | 0 | 0 | 0 | 0 |
| 30 | GK | (Belgium) BEL | Laurent Henkinet | 0 | 0 | 0 | 0 | 0 | 0 |
| 40 | GK | (Belgium) BEL | Matthieu Epolo | 9 | 0 | 9 | 0 | 0 | 0 |
| 45 | GK | (Belgium) BEL | Matteo Godfroid | 0 | 0 | 0 | 0 | 0 | 0 |
| 99 | GK | (Belgium) BEL | Tom Poitoux | 0 | 0 | 0 | 0 | 0 | 0 |
Defenders
| 3 | DF | (Belgium) BEL | Nathan Ngoy | 4 | 0 | 3+1 | 0 | 0 | 0 |
| 4 | DF | (Croatia) CRO | Bosko Sutalo | 9 | 0 | 9 | 0 | 0 | 0 |
| 5 | DF | (Belgium) BEL | Boli Bolingoli | 2 | 0 | 0+2 | 0 | 0 | 0 |
| 13 | DF | (United States) USA | Marlon Fossey | 8 | 0 | 8 | 0 | 0 | 0 |
| 15 | DF | (Ivory Coast) CIV | Souleyman Doumbia | 0 | 0 | 0 | 0 | 0 | 0 |
| 17 | DF | (Belgium) BEL | Ilay Camara | 6 | 0 | 5+1 | 0 | 0 | 0 |
| 25 | DF | (Belgium) BEL | Ibe Hautekiet | 7 | 0 | 7 | 0 | 0 | 0 |
| 29 | DF | (Belgium) BEL | Daan Dierckx | 0 | 0 | 0 | 0 | 0 | 0 |
| 31 | DF | (Croatia) CRO | Mate Simicic | 0 | 0 | 0 | 0 | 0 | 0 |
| 44 | DF | (Scotland) SCO | David Bates | 7 | 0 | 7 | 0 | 0 | 0 |
| 51 | DF | (Belgium) BEL | Lucas Noubi | 2 | 0 | 1+1 | 0 | 0 | 0 |
| 54 | DF | (Belgium) BEL | Alexandro Calut | 4 | 0 | 0+4 | 0 | 0 | 0 |
| 88 | DF | (Belgium) BEL | Henry Lawrence | 7 | 0 | 5+2 | 0 | 0 | 0 |
Midfielders
| 6 | MF | (Greece) GRE | Sotiris Alexandropoulos | 7 | 0 | 0+7 | 0 | 0 | 0 |
| 7 | MF | (Croatia) CRO | Marko Bulat | 9 | 1 | 9 | 1 | 0 | 0 |
| 8 | MF | (Northern Ireland) NIR | Isaac Price | 9 | 0 | 6+3 | 0 | 0 | 0 |
| 14 | MF | (Belgium) BEL | Léandre Kuavita | 9 | 0 | 9 | 0 | 0 | 0 |
| 24 | MF | (Australia) AUS | Aiden O'Neill | 9 | 0 | 9 | 0 | 0 | 0 |
| 33 | MF | (Rwanda) RWA | Hakim Sahabo | 0 | 0 | 0 | 0 | 0 | 0 |
Forwards
| 9 | FW | (Switzerland) SUI | Andi Zeqiri | 3 | 2 | 3 | 2 | 0 | 0 |
| 10 | FW | (Monaco) MON | Viktor Djukanovic | 3 | 0 | 0+3 | 0 | 0 | 0 |
| 11 | FW | (Germany) GER | Dennis Eckert | 2 | 0 | 1+1 | 0 | 0 | 0 |
| 19 | FW | (The Gambia) GAM | Muhammed Badamosi | 4 | 0 | 0+4 | 0 | 0 | 0 |
| 21 | FW | (Morocco) MAR | Soufiane Benjdida | 9 | 2 | 6+3 | 2 | 0 | 0 |
| 23 | FW | (Burkina Faso) BFA | Abdoul Tapsoba | 0 | 0 | 0 | 0 | 0 | 0 |
| 34 | FW | (Belgium) BEL | Yann Gboua | 0 | 0 | 0 | 0 | 0 | 0 |
| 55 | FW | (Morocco) MAR | Brahim Ghalidi | 0 | 0 | 0 | 0 | 0 | 0 |
Players transferred out during the season
| 11 | FW | (France) FRA | Grejohn Kyei | 6 | 0 | 2+4 | 0 | 0 | 0 |
| 27 | MF | (Burkina Faso) BFA | Sacha Bansé | 2 | 0 | 0+2 | 0 | 0 | 0 |
| 28 | FW | (Croatia) CRO | Stipe Perica | 0 | 0 | 0 | 0 | 0 | 0 |
| 56 | MF | (Morocco) MAR | Ilyes Ziani | 0 | 0 | 0 | 0 | 0 | 0 |

Last updated: 29 September 2024
Source: Competitions
