= 2023–24 GNK Dinamo Zagreb season =

GNK Dinamo Zagreb
2023–24 season
- President: Mirko Barišić (until 10 March); Velimir Zajec (from 10 March)
- Head coach: Igor Bišćan (until 21 August); Sergej Jakirović (from 21 August)
- Stadium: Stadion Maksimir
- HNL: 1st
- Croatian Cup: Winners
- Croatian Super Cup: Winners
- UEFA Champions League: Third qualifying round
- UEFA Europa League: Play-off round
- UEFA Europa Conference League: Round of 16
- Top goalscorer: League: Bruno Petković (11); All: Bruno Petković (18)
- Average home league attendance: 9,013
Home colours	Away colours	Third colours

The 2023–24 season was GNK Dinamo Zagreb's 113th season in existence and 32nd consecutive in the Croatian Football League. They also competed in the Croatian Cup, the Croatian Super Cup, the UEFA Champions League, the UEFA Europa League and the UEFA Europa Conference League.

Igor Bišćan started the season as head coach, but after the club's elimination in qualification for the Champions League group stage against AEK Athens, he was sacked and replaced by Sergej Jakirović on 21 August 2023.

== Players ==
=== First-team squad ===
As of 4 March 2024

Note: Flags indicate national team as defined under FIFA eligibility rules; some limited exceptions apply. Players may hold more than one non-FIFA nationality.

No.	Pos.	Nation	Player
1	GK	CRO	Danijel Zagorac
2	DF	IRI	Sadegh Moharrami
3	DF	JPN	Takuya Ogiwara
4	DF	CRO	Boško Šutalo
5	MF	MKD	Arijan Ademi (captain)
6	DF	FRA	Maxime Bernauer
7	MF	CRO	Luka Stojković
8	MF	CRO	Lukas Kačavenda (on loan from Lokomotiva)
9	FW	CRO	Bruno Petković
10	MF	CRO	Martin Baturina
11	FW	AZE	Mahir Emreli
14	MF	CRO	Marko Rog (on loan from Cagliari)
15	DF	CRO	Moreno Živković
17	FW	CRO	Sandro Kulenović
19	FW	CRO	Fran Brodić
20	FW	KOS	Arbër Hoxha
18	DF	FRA	Ronaël Pierre-Gabriel

No.	Pos.	Nation	Player
22	DF	MKD	Stefan Ristovski
23	MF	CRO	Tibor Halilović
25	MF	BIH	Petar Sučić
27	MF	CRO	Josip Mišić
28	DF	FRA	Kévin Théophile-Catherine
30	MF	JPN	Takuro Kaneko (on loan from Consadole Sapporo)
31	MF	CRO	Marko Bulat
32	GK	BIH	Faris Krkalić
33	GK	CRO	Ivan Nevistić
35	DF	CRO	Ivan Cvetko
36	DF	CRO	Noa Mikić
36	MF	CRO	Luka Vrbančić
39	DF	CRO	Mauro Perković
55	DF	CRO	Dino Perić
72	MF	CRO	Gabriel Vidović (on loan from Bayern Munich)
77	FW	CRO	Dario Špikić

As of 4 March 2024 after match against (Croatia) NK Osijek

Squad no.	Name	Nat.	Pos.	Date of birth	Signed from	Apps	Goals
Goalkeepers
1	Danijel Zagorac	(Croatia)	GK	7 February 1987 (aged 37)	(Croatia) Split	78	0
32	Faris Krkalić	(Bosnia and Herzegovina)	GK	15 June 2002 (aged 21)	(Croatia) Kustošija	0	0
33	Ivan Nevistić	(Croatia)	GK	31 July 1998 (aged 25)	(Croatia) Rijeka	21	0
Defenders
2	Sadegh Moharrami	(Iran)	RB	1 March 1996 (aged 28)	(Iran) Persepolis	134	1
3	Takuya Ogiwara	(Japan)	LB	23 November 1999 (aged 24)	(Japan) Urawa	3	0
4	Boško Šutalo	(Croatia)	CB	1 January 2000 (aged 24)	(Italy) Atalanta	24	2
6	Maxime Bernauer	(France)	CB	1 July 1998 (aged 25)	(France) Paris FC	15	2
15	Moreno Živković	(Croatia)	CB	22 May 2004 (aged 19)	(Croatia) Lokomotiva	6	0
18	Ronaël Pierre-Gabriel	(France)	RB	13 June 1998 (aged 25)	(France) Nantes	3	0
22	Stefan Ristovski	(North Macedonia)	RB	12 February 1992 (aged 32)	(Portugal) Sporting CP	134	6
28	Kévin Théophile-Catherine	(France)	CB	28 October 1989 (aged 34)	(France) Saint-Étienne	166	3
35	Ivan Cvetko	(Croatia)	CB	23 November 2005 (aged 18)	(Croatia) Youth Academy	1	0
36	Noa Mikić	(Croatia)	RB	27 January 2007 (aged 17)	(Croatia) Youth Academy	0	0
39	Mauro Perković	(Croatia)	CB	22 March 2003 (aged 20)	(Croatia) Istra 1961	29	2
55	Dino Perić	(Croatia)	CB	12 July 1994 (aged 29)	(Croatia) Lokomotiva	182	15
Midfielders
5	Arijan Ademi	(North Macedonia)	CM	29 May 1991 (aged 32)	(China) Beijing Guoan	395	44
7	Luka Stojković	(Croatia)	AM	28 October 2003 (aged 20)	(Croatia) Lokomotiva	1	0
8	Lukas Kačavenda	(Croatia)	AM	2 March 2003 (aged 20)	(Croatia) Lokomotiva	0	0
10	Martin Baturina	(Croatia)	AM	16 February 2003 (aged 21)	(Croatia) Youth Academy	103	12
14	Marko Rog	(Croatia)	AM	19 July 1995 (aged 28)	(Italy) Cagliari	62	11
23	Tibor Halilović	(Croatia)	CM	18 March 1995 (aged 28)	(Netherlands) Heerenveen	16	2
25	Petar Sučić	(Bosnia and Herzegovina)	CM	25 October 2003 (aged 20)	(Bosnia and Herzegovina) HŠK Zrinjski Mostar	29	0
27	Josip Mišić	(Croatia)	DM	28 June 1994 (aged 29)	(Portugal) Sporting CP	159	6
31	Marko Bulat	(Croatia)	CM	26 September 2001 (aged 22)	(Croatia) Šibenik	78	6
36	Luka Vrbančić	(Croatia)	AM	4 July 2005 (aged 18)	(Croatia) Youth Academy	2	1
72	Gabriel Vidović	(Croatia)	AM	1 December 2003 (aged 20)	(Germany) Bayern Munich	26	5
Forwards
9	Bruno Petković	(Croatia)	FW	16 September 1994 (aged 29)	(Italy) Bologna	238	76
11	Mahir Emreli	(Azerbaijan)	RW	1 July 1997 (aged 26)	(Poland) Legia Warsaw	45	10
17	Sandro Kulenović	(Croatia)	FW	4 December 1999 (aged 24)	(Poland) Legia Warsaw	35	5
19	Fran Brodić	(Croatia)	FW	8 January 1997 (aged 27)	(Croatia) Varaždin	5	2
20	Arbër Hoxha	(Kosovo)	LW	6 October 1998 (aged 25)	(Croatia) Slaven Belupo	9	0
30	Takuro Kaneko	(Japan)	RW	30 July 1997 (aged 26)	(Japan) Hokkaido	28	4
77	Dario Špikić	(Croatia)	RW	22 March 1999 (aged 24)	(Croatia) Gorica	110	14

== Transfers ==
=== In ===
No.	Pos	Player	Transferred from	Fee	Date	Source
6	CB	(France) Maxime Bernauer	(France) Paris	€1.2 million	7 June 2023	
15	LB	(Ukraine) Bohdan Mykhaylichenko	(Belgium) Anderlecht	Bonuses	24 June 2023	
30	RW	(Japan) Takuro Kaneko	(Japan) Hokkaido	€0.4 million	25 June 2023	
7	MF	(Croatia) Luka Stojković	(Croatia) Lokomotiva	€3.0 million	22 August 2023	
8	MF	(Croatia) Lukas Kačavenda	(Croatia) Lokomotiva	Loan	26 August 2023	
72	MF	(Croatia) Gabriel Vidović	(Germany) Bayern Munich	Loan	30 August 2023	
23	MF	(Croatia) Tibor Halilović	(Netherlands) Heerenveen	Unknown	4 September 2023	
3	CB	(Uruguay) Joaquín Sosa	(Italy) Bologna	Loan	4 September 2023	
5	MF	(North Macedonia) Arijan Ademi	(China) Beijing Guoan		8 September 2023	
19	FW	(Croatia) Fran Brodić	(Croatia) Varaždin		8 September 2023	
15	DF	(Croatia) Moreno Živković	(Croatia) Lokomotiva		4 January 2024	
20	FW	(Kosovo) Arbër Hoxha	(Croatia) Slaven Belupo	€1.0 million	9 January 2024	
3	DF	(Japan) Takuya Ogiwara	(Japan) Urawa Red Diamonds		12 January 2024	
18	DF	(France) Ronaël Pierre-Gabriel	(France) Nantes	Free	7 February 2024	
14	MF	(Croatia) Marko Rog	(Italy) Cagliari	Loan	12 February 2024	

=== Out ===
No.	Pos	Player	Transferred to	Fee	Date	Source
28	DF	(France) Kévin Théophile-Catherine	Free agent	Free	1 July 2023	
	MF	(Croatia) Niko Janković	(Croatia) HNK Rijeka	Unknown	26 June 2023	
25	FW	(Croatia) Mario Ćuže	(Bosnia and Herzegovina) Zrinjski Mostar	Unknown	5 July 2023	
4	DF	(Montenegro) Stefan Milić	(Montenegro) Dečić	Free	12 July 2023	
37	DF	(Croatia) Josip Šutalo	(Netherlands) Ajax	€20.5 million	21 August 2023	
40	GK	(Croatia) Dominik Livaković	(Turkey) Fenerbahçe	€9.0 million	24 August 2023	
7	MF	(Croatia) Luka Ivanušec	(Netherlands) Feyenoord	€8.5 million	25 August 2023	
66	FW	(Croatia) Bartol Barišić	(Slovakia) DAC Dunajská Streda	Unknown	6 September 2023	
14	MF	(Croatia) Robert Ljubičić	(Greece) AEK Athens	€3.0 million	31 January 2024	

=== Loan out ===
No.	Pos	Player	Transferred to	Fee	Date	Source
24	MF	(Croatia) Marko Tolić	(Slovakia) Slovan Bratislava	€1.30m	23 June 2023	
	DF	(Croatia) Moreno Živković	(Croatia) Lokomotiva	Free	30 June 2023	
35	DF	(Croatia) Jakov Gurlica	(Slovenia) Bravo	Free	11 July 2023	
15	MF	(Bosnia and Herzegovina) Marko Soldo	(Croatia) HNK Gorica	Free	14 July 2023	
23	MF	(Croatia) Marko Brkljača	(Slovenia) Aluminij	Free	17 July 2023	
12	MF	(Croatia) Petar Bočkaj	(Cyprus) Pafos	Free	27 July 2023	
3	DF	(Croatia) Daniel Štefulj	(Croatia) Slaven Belupo	Free	2 August 2023	

== Pre-season and friendlies ==
24 June 2023 Friendly	Dugo Selo (Croatia)	0–1	(Croatia) Dinamo Zagreb	Dugo Selo
18:00			Barišić 78'	Stadium: Gradski stadion

29 June 2023 Friendly	Koper (Slovenia)	2–2	(Croatia) Dinamo Zagreb	Kranj
	Krajinović 62' (pen.); Kočar 66'		Topić 21'; Marin 49' (pen.)

3 July 2023 Friendly	Dinamo Zagreb (Croatia)	3–2	(Bulgaria) CSKA 1948	Kranj
18:00	Emreli 21'; Drmić 49'; Špikić 57'		Tsenov 61'; Moharrami 64' (o.g.)	Stadium: Gradski stadion

7 July 2023 Friendly	Dinamo Zagreb (Croatia)	1–1	(Czech Republic) Sparta Prague	Kranj
	Petković 14' (pen.)		Pešek 2'

== Competitions ==
=== Overall record ===
Competition	First match	Last match	Starting round	Final position	Record							
Competition	First match	Last match	Starting round	Final position	Pld	W	D	L	GF	GA	GD	Win %
HNL	21 July 2023	10 May 2024	Matchday 1	Winners	27	17	6	4	48	22	+26	62.96
Croatian Cup	27 September 2023	30 May 2024	Round of 32	Winners	4	4	0	0	17	1	+16	100.00
Croatian Super Cup	15 July 2023		Final	Winners	1	1	0	0	1	0	+1	100.00
UEFA Champions League	25 July 2023	19 August 2023	Second qualifying round	Third qualifying round	4	2	1	1	9	4	+5	50.00
UEFA Europa League	24 August 2023	31 August 2023	Play-off round	Play-off round	2	1	0	1	4	5	−1	50.00
UEFA Europa Conference League	21 September 2023	14 March 2024	Group stage	Round of 16	10	5	1	4	15	11	+4	50.00
Total					48	30	8	10	94	43	+51	62.50

Last updated: 3 April 2024
Source: Soccerway

=== League table ===
Pos	Team	Pld	W	D	L	GF	GA	GD	Pts	Qualification or relegation
1	Dinamo Zagreb (C)	36	25	7	4	67	30	+37	82	Qualification to Champions League play-off round (Note: Since already qualified Real Madrid won the Champions League, Dinamo Zagreb was promoted to the Champions League play-off round as the champion with the highest coefficient in Champions League qualifying.)
2	Rijeka	36	23	5	8	69	30	+39	74	Qualification to Europa League second qualifying round (Note: The 2023–24 Croatian Football Cup winners qualified for the Europa League second qualifying round. Since the cup winners (Dinamo Zagreb) qualified for the Champions League, the Europa League spot was passed to the second-placed team, and the second Conference League second qualifying round spot was passed to the fourth-placed team.)
3	Hajduk Split	36	21	5	10	54	26	+28	68	Qualification to Conference League second qualifying round
4	Osijek	36	16	9	11	62	43	+19	57	Qualification to Conference League second qualifying round
5	Lokomotiva	36	12	15	9	52	45	+7	51	

Source: SuperSport HNL
Rules for classification: 1) Points; 2) Head-to-head points; 3) Head-to-head goal difference; 4) Head-to-head goals scored (at home if two teams tied); 5) Goal difference; 6) Goals scored; 7) Play-off
(Note: Criteria 2-4 and 7 is only used if deciding champion, teams to international competition or teams for relegation and in that case criteria 6 will not be used).
(C) Champions

=== Croatian Cup ===
27 September 2023 Round of 32	Ponikve	1–4	Dinamo Zagreb	Zagreb
				Stadium: SRC Ponikve

1 November 2023 Round of 16	Oriolik	0–8	Dinamo Zagreb	Oriovac
				Stadium: Igralište NK Oriolik

=== Croatian Super Cup ===
15 July 2023 Final	Dinamo Zagreb	1–0	Hajduk Split	Zagreb
20:00	Baturina 52'	Report		Stadium: Stadion Maksimir; Attendance: 17,707; Referee: Dario Bel

=== UEFA Champions League ===
==== Second qualifying round ====
The draw for the second qualifying round was held on 21 June 2023.

25 July 2023 First leg	Dinamo Zagreb (Croatia)	4–0	(Kazakhstan) Astana	Zagreb
20:00	Špikić 36'; Ivanušec 41', 43', 56'	Report		Stadium: Stadion Maksimir; Attendance: 7,123; Referee: Guillermo Cuadra Fernández (Spain)

2 August 2023 Second leg	Astana (Kazakhstan)	0–2 (0–6 agg.)	(Croatia) Dinamo Zagreb	Astana, Kazakhstan
16:00 (20:00 ALMT)		Report	Marochkin 24' (o.g.); Marin 89'	Stadium: Astana Arena; Attendance: 26,978; Referee: Dennis Higler (Netherlands)

==== Third qualifying round ====
15 August 2023 First leg	Dinamo Zagreb (Croatia)	1–2	(Greece) AEK Athens	Zagreb
20:00	Bulat 39'	Report	Zuber 59'; Galanopoulos 90'	Stadium: Stadion Maksimir; Attendance: 13,311; Referee: João Pinheiro (Portugal)

19 August 2023 Second leg	AEK Athens (Greece)	2–2 (4–3 agg.)	(Croatia) Dinamo Zagreb	Athens, Greece
20:45 (21:45 EEST)	Araujo 90+2'; Vida 90+10'	Report	J. Šutalo 45+2'; Ljubičić 65'	Stadium: Agia Sophia Stadium; Attendance: 30,100; Referee: Espen Eskås (Norway)

=== UEFA Europa League ===
==== Play-off round ====
24 August 2023 First leg	Dinamo Zagreb (Croatia)	3–1	(Czech Republic) Sparta Prague	Zagreb
20:00	Špikić 44'; Perić 59'; Ivanušec 61'	Report	Krejčí 39' (pen.)	Stadium: Stadion Maksimir; Attendance: 12,170; Referee: Marco Guida (Italy)

31 August 2023 Second leg	Sparta Prague (Czech Republic)	4–1 (5–4 agg.)	(Croatia) Dinamo Zagreb	Prague, Czech Republic
19:00	Haraslín 2'; Sørensen 24'; Panák 67'; Olatunji 87'	Report	Baturina 71'	Stadium: Stadion Letná; Attendance: 17,953; Referee: Tobias Stieler (Germany)

=== UEFA Europa Conference League ===
==== Group stage ====
Pos	Team	Pld	W	D	L	GF	GA	GD	Pts	Qualification	PLZ	DZG	AST	BAL
1	(Czech Republic) Viktoria Plzeň	6	6	0	0	9	1	+8	18	Advance to round of 16	—	1–0	3–0	1–0
2	(Croatia) Dinamo Zagreb	6	3	0	3	10	5	+5	9	Advance to knockout round play-offs	0–1	—	5–1	3–0
3	(Kazakhstan) Astana	6	1	1	4	4	13	−9	4 (Note: Ranked on head-to-head points: Astana 4, Ballkani 1.)		1–2	0–2	—	0–0
4	(Kosovo) Ballkani	6	1	1	4	3	7	−4	4		0–1	2–0	1–2	—

Source: UEFA
Rules for classification: Group stage tiebreakers
Notes:

21 September 2023 1	Dinamo Zagreb (Croatia)	5–1	(Kazakhstan) Astana	Zagreb
21:00	Petković 43' (pen.), 53' (pen.); Bulat 58'; Marin 85'; Halilović 90+3'	Report	Hovhannisyan 78'	Stadium: Stadion Maksimir; Attendance: 10,005; Referee: Paweł Raczkowski (Poland)

5 October 2023 2	Ballkani (Kosovo)	2–0	(Croatia) Dinamo Zagreb	Pristina, Kosovo (Note: Ballkani were unable to play at their regular stadium, the Theranda City Stadium, in Suva Reka, which did not meet UEFA requirements.)
18:45	Kryeziu 44'; Hamidi 83'	Report		Stadium: Fadil Vokrri Stadium; Attendance: 9,654; Referee: Atilla Karaoğlan (Turkey)

26 October 2023 3	Dinamo Zagreb (Croatia)	0–1	(Czech Republic) Viktoria Plzeň	Zagreb
21:00		Report	Chorý 69' (pen.)	Stadium: Stadion Maksimir; Attendance: 8,407; Referee: Robert Jones (England)

9 November 2023 4	Viktoria Plzeň (Czech Republic)	1–0	(Croatia) Dinamo Zagreb	Plzeň, Czech Republic
18:45	Chorý 35' (pen.)	Report		Stadium: Doosan Arena; Attendance: 11,084; Referee: Anastasios Sidiropoulos (Greece)

30 November 2023 5	Astana (Kazakhstan)	0–2	(Croatia) Dinamo Zagreb	Astana, Kazakhstan
16:30 (21:30 ALMT)		Report	Vidović 48'; Kaneko 79'	Stadium: Astana Arena; Attendance: 20,313; Referee: John Beaton (Scotland)

14 December 2023 6	Dinamo Zagreb (Croatia)	3–0	(Kosovo) Ballkani	Zagreb
21:00	Perić 70'; Petković 72' 77' (pen.)	Report		Stadium: Stadion Maksimir; Attendance: 6,048; Referee: Ricardo de Burgos Bengoetxea (Spain)

==== Knockout phase ====
===== Knockout round play-offs =====
15 February 2024 First leg	Real Betis (Spain)	0–1	(Croatia) Dinamo Zagreb	Seville, Spain
21:00		Report	Petković 76' (pen.)	Stadium: Benito Villamarín; Attendance: 25,091; Referee: Mykola Balakin (Ukraine)

22 February 2024 Second leg	Dinamo Zagreb (Croatia)	1–1 (2–1 agg.)	(Spain) Real Betis	Zagreb
18:45	Kaneko 59'	Report	Bakambu 38'	Stadium: Stadion Maksimir; Attendance: 18,002; Referee: Urs Schnyder (Switzerland)

===== Round of 16 =====
7 March 2024 First leg	Dinamo Zagreb (Croatia)	2–0	(Greece) PAOK	Zagreb
21:00	Petković 37', 71'	Report		Stadium: Stadion Maksimir; Attendance: 18,562; Referee: Aliyar Aghayev (Azerbaijan)

14 March 2024 Second leg	PAOK (Greece)	5–1 (5–3 agg.)	(Croatia) Dinamo Zagreb	Thessaloniki, Greece
18:45	Rahman 27'; Sučić 33' (o.g.); Brandon 42'; Koulierakis 72'; A. Živković 88' (pen.)	Report	Hoxha 49'	Stadium: Toumba Stadium; Attendance: 19,701; Referee: Harm Osmers (Germany)

== Statistics ==
=== Appearances and goals ===
As of 27 May 2024

No.	Pos	Nat	Player	Total		HNL		Croatian Cup		Croatian Super Cup		Europe	
No.	Pos	Nat	Player	Apps	Goals	Apps	Goals	Apps	Goals	Apps	Goals	Apps	Goals
Goalkeepers
1	GK	(Croatia) CRO	Danijel Zagorac	16	0	11	0	2	0	0	0	3	0
32	GK	(Croatia) CRO	Faris Krkalić	1	0	1	0	0	0	0	0	0	0
33	GK	(Croatia) CRO	Ivan Nevistić	34	0	21	0	4	0	0	0	9	0
Defenders
2	DF	(Iran) IRI	Sadegh Moharrami	27	0	10+3	0	1	0	0+1	0	10+2	0
3	DF	(Japan) JPN	Takuya Ogiwara	11	0	2+4	0	2+1	0	0	0	0+2	0
4	DF	(Croatia) CRO	Boško Šutalo	19	0	8+2	0	1+2	0	0	0	3+3	0
6	DF	(France) FRA	Maxime Bernauer	26	2	16+1	1	3	1	0	0	4+2	0
15	DF	(Croatia) CRO	Moreno Živković	7	1	6	1	1	0	0	0	0	0
18	DF	(France) FRA	Ronaël Pierre-Gabriel	11	0	6+1	0	4	0	0	0	0	0
22	DF	(North Macedonia) MKD	Stefan Ristovski	44	0	24+2	0	3	0	1	0	14	0
28	DF	(France) FRA	Kévin Théophile-Catherine	28	0	21	0	3	0	0	0	4	0
35	DF	(Croatia) CRO	Ivan Cvetko	1	0	0	0	0+1	0	0	0	0	0
39	DF	(Croatia) CRO	Mauro Perković	32	2	20+1	2	3+1	0	0	0	6+1	0
55	DF	(Croatia) CRO	Dino Perić	21	3	11+1	1	0	0	1	0	8	2
86	DF	(Croatia) CRO	Leon Jakirović	2	0	1+1	0	0	0	0	0	0	0
97	DF	(Croatia) CRO	Ante Sušak	1	0	0+1	0	0	0	0	0	0	0
Midfielders
5	MF	(North Macedonia) MKD	Arijan Ademi	31	2	10+17	2	1+3	0	0	0	0	0
7	MF	(Croatia) CRO	Luka Stojković	2	0	0+1	0	0	0	0	0	0+1	0
10	MF	(Croatia) CRO	Martin Baturina	51	8	30+2	5	3	1	1	1	13+2	1
14	MF	(Croatia) CRO	Marko Rog	9	0	1+5	0	0+3	0	0	0	0	0
23	MF	(Croatia) CRO	Tibor Halilović	19	3	3+7	1	3	1	0	0	0+6	1
25	MF	(Bosnia and Herzegovina) BIH	Petar Sučić	43	2	16+9	1	6	1	0+1	0	5+6	0
27	MF	(Croatia) CRO	Josip Mišić	52	0	31+1	0	3	0	1	0	16	0
31	MF	(Croatia) CRO	Marko Bulat	38	7	13+10	4	0+2	1	1	0	11+1	2
36	MF	(Croatia) CRO	Luka Vrbančić	7	3	1+3	1	1+2	2	0	0	0	0
42	MF	(Croatia) CRO	Luka Lukanić	1	0	0	0	0	0	0	0	0+1	0
66	MF	(Croatia) CRO	Branko Pavić	2	0	1+1	0	0	0	0	0	0	0
70	MF	(Croatia) CRO	Tin Miljak	1	0	0+1	0	0	0	0	0	0	0
72	MF	(Croatia) CRO	Gabriel Vidović	40	9	19+8	7	1+3	1	0	0	5+4	1
Forwards
9	FW	(Croatia) CRO	Bruno Petković	44	18	26+1	11	3	0	1	0	13	7
11	FW	(Azerbaijan) AZE	Mahir Emreli	24	5	4+10	4	0+1	1	0	0	4+5	0
17	FW	(Croatia) CRO	Sandro Kulenović	35	11	9+12	7	3+3	4	0	0	1+7	0
18	FW	(Switzerland) SUI	Josip Drmić	12	6	3+5	3	1	3	0	0	0+3	0
19	FW	(Croatia) CRO	Fran Brodić	13	7	6+6	6	1	1	0	0	0	0
20	FW	(Kosovo) KOS	Arbër Hoxha	22	2	8+7	1	2+1	0	0	0	4	1
30	FW	(Japan) JPN	Takuro Kaneko	41	5	21+7	2	2+2	1	0	0	5+4	2
41	FW	(Croatia) CRO	Toni Majić	2	0	1+1	0	0	0	0	0	0	0
43	FW	(Croatia) CRO	Zlatan Koščević	1	0	0+1	0	0	0	0	0	0	0
77	FW	(Croatia) CRO	Dario Špikić	45	6	13+15	4	3	0	1	0	10+3	2
Players transferred or loaned out during the season
3	DF	(Uruguay) URU	Joaquín Sosa	3	0	0+1	0	2	0	0	0	0	0
7	MF	(Croatia) CRO	Luka Ivanušec	8	5	2+1	1	0	0	1	0	4	4
14	MF	(Croatia) CRO	Robert Ljubičić	28	2	10+6	1	0	0	1	0	10+1	1
15	DF	(Ukraine) UKR	Bohdan Mykhaylichenko	15	0	3+3	0	0+1	0	0	0	4+4	0
17	FW	(Croatia) CRO	Fran Topić	1	0	0	0	0	0	0+1	0	0	0
20	FW	(Croatia) CRO	Antonio Marin	17	4	1+6	0	2	2	0+1	0	1+6	2
35	MF	(Croatia) CRO	Vito Čaić	2	0	0	0	0+2	0	0	0	0	0
37	DF	(Croatia) CRO	Josip Šutalo	8	1	2+1	0	0	0	1	0	4	1
40	GK	(Croatia) CRO	Dominik Livaković	8	0	3	0	0	0	1	0	4	0
41	FW	(Croatia) CRO	Gabriel Rukavina	5	0	0+2	0	1	0	0	0	0+2	0
42	DF	(Croatia) CRO	Fran Pavlek	1	0	0	0	0+1	0	0	0	0	0
70	MF	(Bosnia and Herzegovina) BIH	Luka Menalo	10	0	1+3	0	1+1	0	0+1	0	1+2	0
97	FW	(Australia) AUS	Deni Jurić	1	0	0+1	0	0	0	0	0	0	0
