= Kuavita =

Kuavita is a surname. Notable people with the surname include:

- Léandre Kuavita (born 2004), Belgian footballer
- Noah Kuavita (born 1999), Belgian gymnast
