= Ilay Camara =

Senegalese footballer (born 2003)

Personal information
- Full name: Ilay Alioune Gino Rian Camara
- Date of birth: 18 January 2003 (age 23)
- Place of birth: Bonheiden, Belgium
- Height: 1.74 m (5 ft 9 in)
- Positions: Full-back; winger

Team information
- Current team: Anderlecht
- Number: 7

Youth career
- Keerbergen
- OH Leuven
- Anderlecht

Senior career*
Years	Team	Apps	(Gls)
2022–2023	RSCA Futures	30	(0)
2023–2025	RWDM	28	(3)
2024–2025	→ Standard Liège (loan)	34	(0)
2025–	Anderlecht	25	(2)

International career^{‡}
2018	Belgium U15	1	(0)
2018–2019	Belgium U16	6	(0)
2025–	Senegal	3	(0)
- * Club domestic league appearances and goals as of 21 May 2026 ‡ National team caps and goals as of 23:06, 18 November 2025 (UTC)

Ilay Alioune Gino Rian Camara (born 18 January 2003) is a professional footballer who plays as a full-back or winger for Belgian Pro League club Anderlecht. Born in Belgium, he plays for the Senegal national team.

== Club career ==
Born in Bonheiden in Antwerp Province, Camara began playing as a youth for KSC Keerbergen before joining OH Leuven. In 2019, he joined R.S.C. Anderlecht. In February 2023, while playing for the reserve team of Les Mauves in the second-tier Challenger Pro League, the 20-year-old signed his first professional contract, lasting until June 2025.

On 6 September 2023, Camara joined Belgian Pro League side R.W.D. Molenbeek on a three-year deal in a free transfer. He arrived to cover the injury of Sambu Mansoni. He played 28 games, scoring three goals and assisting five, as his team were relegated; on 26 November he was sent off in a 2–1 loss on his return to Anderlecht.

In June 2024, Camara was linked with a transfer to three clubs of the EFL Championship – Coventry City, Preston North End and Burnley – for a fee of £1.5-2 million. Stade de Reims of the French Ligue 1 were also interested. Instead, on 13 August he was loaned to Standard Liège of the Belgian top flight, with the option to purchase. In his first month at the club, he played at left and right full-back positions, being praised for his performances by newspaper La Dernière Heure.

In April 2025, Standard signed Camara on a permanent four-year deal, before selling him back to Anderlecht on 5 July for a fee reported by RTBF as between €4 million and €4.5 million. He signed a contract to last until 2030. Having missed the start of the season through injury, he made his debut on 3 August with an assist in a 2–0 win away to Cercle Brugge, and four days later on his European debut he set up the opening goal for Nilson Angulo in a 3–0 home win over Moldova's Sheriff Tiraspol in UEFA Conference League qualifiers. He was substituted from that game after 30 minutes and was ruled out with a hamstring injury.

== International career ==
Camara was born in Belgium to a Senegalese father and Belgian mother and holds dual citizenship. He is a former youth international for Belgium.

On 13 March 2025, Camara was called up to the senior Senegal national team for a set of 2026 FIFA World Cup qualification matches. Eight days later, his request to switch international allegiance to Senegal was approved by FIFA. He made his debut in the starting line-up in a 2–0 win over Togo on 25 March.

== Career statistics ==
=== Club ===
As of match played 21 May 2026

Appearances and goals by club, season and competition
Club	Season	League			Belgian Cup		Europe		Other		Total	
Club	Season	Division	Apps	Goals	Apps	Goals	Apps	Goals	Apps	Goals	Apps	Goals
RSCA Futures	2022–23	Challenger Pro League	17	0	—		—		9 (Note: Appearances in Challenger Pro League play-offs)	0	22	0
RSCA Futures	2023–24	Challenger Pro League	4	0	—		—		—		4	0
RSCA Futures	Total		22	0	—		—		9	0	26	0
RWDM	2023–24	Belgian Pro League	28	0	3	0	—		—		31	0
Standard Liège (loan)	2024–25	Belgian Pro League	34	0	2	0	—		—		36	0
Anderlecht	2025–26	Belgian Pro League	25	2	3	0	1 (Note: Appearance in UEFA Conference League)	0	—		29	2
Career total			109	2	8	0	1	0	9	0	125	2

=== International ===
As of match played 18 November 2025

Appearances and goals by national team and year
National team	Year	Apps	Goals
Senegal	2025	3	0
Total		3	0
