= Boško Šutalo =

Croatian footballer (born 2000)

Personal information
- Date of birth: 1 January 2000 (age 26)
- Place of birth: Metković, Croatia
- Height: 1.88 m (6 ft 2 in)
- Position: Defender

Team information
- Current team: Aris (on loan from Standard Liège)
- Number: 44

Youth career
- 2010–2015: Neretva
- 2015–2017: RNK Split
- 2017–2019: Osijek

Senior career*
Years	Team	Apps	(Gls)
2018–2019	Osijek II	10	(1)
2018–2020	Osijek	28	(0)
2020–2022	Atalanta	14	(0)
2021–2022	→ Hellas Verona (loan)	24	(0)
2022–2024	Dinamo Zagreb	14	(1)
2024–	Standard Liège	25	(1)
2025–2026	→ Cracovia (loan)	27	(0)
2026–	→ Aris (loan)	3	(0)

International career
2016	Croatia U16	3	(0)
2018	Croatia U18	3	(1)
2018–2019	Croatia U19	9	(3)
2019–2022	Croatia U21	19	(1)
- * Club domestic league appearances and goals as of 21:00, 19 September 2026 (UTC)

Boško Šutalo (Croatian pronunciation: [bôʃko ʃǔːtalo]; born 1 January 2000) is a Croatian professional footballer who plays as a defender for Super League Greece club Aris, on loan from Standard Liège.

== Career ==
=== Osijek ===
In 2015, Šutalo joined RNK Split from his starting club NK Neretva and started playing for their under-15 team.

In 2017, Šutalo joined youth team of Osijek and after a year he debuted for the first team under Zoran Zekić. He made his Prva HNL debut on 20 October 2018 in a 4–1 victory over Rudeš.

On 25 July 2019, he made his European debut in the Europa League second qualifying round against CSKA Sofia.

=== Atalanta ===
On 30 January 2020, Šutalo joined Serie A side Atalanta for a €5 million fee. He made his debut for the club in a 2–0 win over Napoli on 2 July, coming on for Rafael Tolói in 89th minute. He earned his first start three days later in a 1–0 win over Cagliari, coming off for Tolói in 83rd minute.

On 14 January 2021, he scored his debut goal for the club, as Atalanta defeated Cagliari 3–1 in the Coppa Italia. In total, he played 14 matches in Serie A and three matches in the Coppa Italia.

=== Hellas Verona ===
On 25 August 2021, Šutalo joined Serie A side Hellas Verona on loan. He made his debut two days later against Inter Milan in a 3–1 defeat. In total, he played 24 matches in Serie A and one match in the Coppa Italia.

=== Dinamo Zagreb ===
Šutalo joined Prva HNL club Dinamo Zagreb on a permanent deal on 21 June 2022 for a term of five years. On 27 August 2022, he suffered a broken ankle which put him out of the pitch for one year.

=== Standard Liège ===
On 8 July 2024, Šutalo moved to Standard Liège in Belgium on a five-year deal. He made his debut on 27 July against Genk. In total, he played 27 games and scored once in his first season in Belgium.

==== Loan to Cracovia ====
On 21 August 2025, Šutalo joined Cracovia in Poland on a season-long loan with an option to buy. He also signed a contract for four more seasons that would come into effect if Cracovia exercised the option.

==== Loan to Aris Thessaloniki ====
On 24 August 2026, Šutalo joined Aris Thessaloniki in Greece on a season-long loan with an option to buy.

== Career statistics ==
As of match played 23 May 2026

Appearances and goals by club, season and competition
Club	Season	League			National cup (Note: Appearances in Croatian Cup, Coppa Italia, Belgian Cup, Polish Cup)		Continental		Total	
Club	Season	Division	Apps	Goals	Apps	Goals	Apps	Goals	Apps	Goals
Osijek II	2018–19	Druga HNL	10	1	—		—		10	1
Osijek	2018–19	Prva HNL	12	0	1	0	—		13	0
Osijek	2019–20	Prva HNL	16	0	3	0	2 (Note: Appearances in UEFA Europa League)	0	21	0
Osijek	Total		28	0	4	0	2	0	34	0
Atalanta	2019–20	Serie A	7	0	—		0	0	7	0
Atalanta	2020–21	Serie A	7	0	2	1	0	0	9	1
Atalanta	Total		14	0	2	1	0	0	16	1
Hellas Verona (loan)	2021–22	Serie A	24	0	1	0	—		25	0
Dinamo Zagreb	2022–23	Prva HNL	4	1	0	0	4 (Note: Appearances in UEFA Champions League)	0	8	1
Dinamo Zagreb	2023–24	Prva HNL	10	0	3	0	6 (Note: Two appearances in UEFA Europa League, four appearances in UEFA Conference League)	0	19	0
Dinamo Zagreb	Total		14	1	3	0	10	0	27	1
Standard Liège	2024–25	Belgian Pro League	25	1	2	0	—		27	1
Cracovia (loan)	2025–26	Ekstraklasa	27	0	1	0	—		28	0
Career total			142	3	13	1	12	0	167	4

== Honours ==
Dinamo Zagreb

- Croatian Football League: 2022–23, 2023–24
- Croatian Cup: 2023–24
- Croatian Super Cup: 2023
