= Marko Bulat (footballer) =

Croatian footballer

Personal information
- Date of birth: 26 September 2001 (age 25)
- Place of birth: Šibenik, Croatia
- Height: 1.78 m (5 ft 10 in)
- Position: Midfielder

Team information
- Current team: Raków Częstochowa
- Number: 5

Youth career
- 2010–2017: Šibenik

Senior career*
Years	Team	Apps	(Gls)
2017–2021	Šibenik	91	(9)
2021–2025	Dinamo Zagreb	59	(5)
2024–2025	→ Standard Liège (loan)	30	(1)
2025–	Raków Częstochowa	35	(5)

International career
2016–2017	Croatia U16	4	(0)
2017–2018	Croatia U17	9	(1)
2018	Croatia U18	2	(0)
2018–2020	Croatia U19	15	(0)
2021	Croatia U20	1	(1)
2021–2023	Croatia U21	6	(0)
- * Club domestic league appearances and goals as of 11:28, 16 September 2026 (UTC)

Marko Bulat (Croatian pronunciation: [mâːrko bǔlat]; born 26 September 2001) is a Croatian professional footballer who plays as a midfielder for Ekstraklasa club Raków Częstochowa.

== Club career ==
On 2 July 2024, Bulat joined Standard Liège in Belgium on loan with an option to buy.

== Personal life ==
He is the son of Josip and the nephew of Ivan Bulat, both retired footballers.

== Career statistics ==
As of match played 6 August 2026

Appearances and goals by club, season and competition
Club	Season	League			National cup (Note: Includes Croatian Cup, Belgian Cup, Polish Cup)		Europe		Other		Total	
Club	Season	Division	Apps	Goals	Apps	Goals	Apps	Goals	Apps	Goals	Apps	Goals
Šibenik	2017–18	Druga HNL	20	0	0	0	—		—		20	0
Šibenik	2018–19	Druga HNL	23	6	1	0	—		2 (Note: Appearances in Croatian First League promotion play-offs)	0	26	6
Šibenik	2019–20	Druga HNL	17	0	3	0	—		0	0	20	0
Šibenik	2020–21	Prva HNL	31	3	1	0	—		—		32	3
Šibenik	Total		91	9	5	0	—		2	0	98	9
Dinamo Zagreb	2021–22	Prva HNL	15	1	2	0	5 (Note: One appearance in UEFA Champions League, four appearances in UEFA Europa League)	0	—		22	1
Dinamo Zagreb	2022–23	HNL	21	0	3	0	3 (Note: Appearances in UEFA Champions League)	0	0	0	27	0
Dinamo Zagreb	2023–24	HNL	23	4	2	1	12 (Note: Three appearances and one goal in UEFA Champions League, two appearances in UEFA Europa League, seven appearances and one goal in UEFA Europa Conference League)	2	1 (Note: Appearance in Croatian Super Cup)	0	38	7
Dinamo Zagreb	Total		59	5	7	1	20	2	1	0	87	8
Standard Liège (loan)	2024–25	Belgian Pro League	23	1	2	0	—		7 (Note: Appearances in UEFA Europa League play-offs)	0	32	1
Raków Częstochowa	2025–26	Ekstraklasa	31	4	4	0	9 (Note: Appearance(s) in UEFA Conference League)	0	—		44	4
Raków Częstochowa	2026–27	Ekstraklasa	2	0	0	0	1	0	—		3	0
Raków Częstochowa	Total		33	4	4	0	10	0	—		47	4
Career total			206	19	18	1	30	2	10	0	264	22

== Honours ==
Šibenik

- Croatian Second Football League: 2019–20

Dinamo Zagreb

- Croatian Football League: 2021–22, 2022–23, 2023–24
- Croatian Cup: 2023–24
- Croatian Super Cup: 2023
