= Dennis Eckert =

Iranian footballer

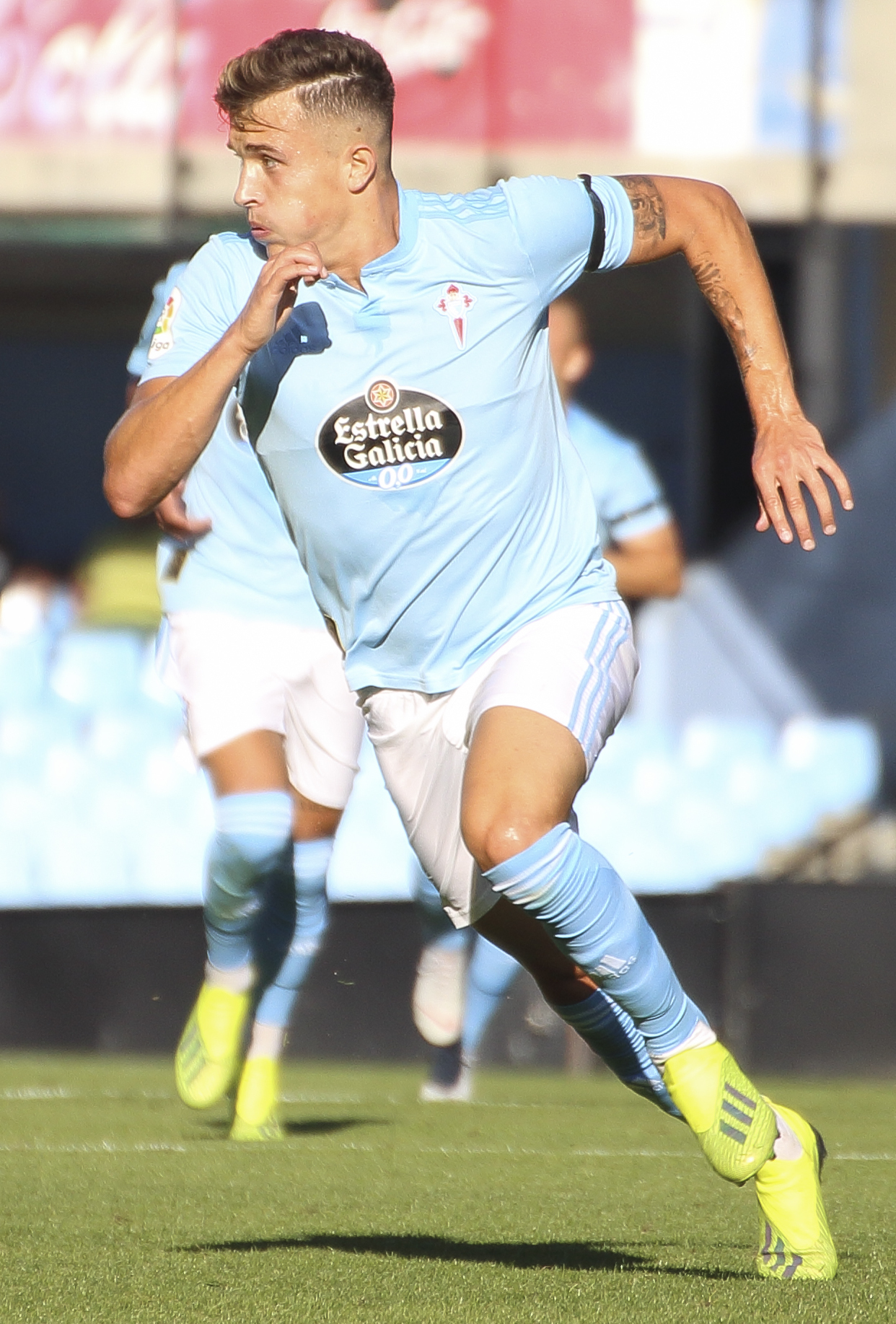
- Eckert with Celta in 2018

Personal information
- Full name: Dennis-Yerai Eckert Ayensa; Dennis Dargahi
- Date of birth: 9 January 1997 (age 29)
- Place of birth: Bonn, Germany
- Height: 1.82 m (6 ft 0 in)
- Positions: Forward; winger; midfielder

Team information
- Current team: Standard Liège
- Number: 10

Youth career
- 2001–2007: Pulheimer SC
- 2007–2011: 1. FC Köln
- 2011–2013: Alemannia Aachen
- 2013–2015: Borussia Mönchengladbach

Senior career*
Years	Team	Apps	(Gls)
2015–2017	Borussia Mönchengladbach II	4	(0)
2017–2018	Celta B	48	(9)
2018–2019	Celta	9	(0)
2019	→ Excelsior (loan)	12	(2)
2019–2022	FC Ingolstadt	78	(25)
2022–2025	Union SG	42	(11)
2024–2025	→ Standard Liège (loan)	33	(7)
2025–	Standard Liège	46	(12)

International career^{‡}
2015	Germany U19	1	(0)
2026–	Iran	4	(0)
- * Club domestic league appearances and goals as of 20:12, 11 November 2026 (UTC) ‡ National team caps and goals as of 17 November 2026

Dennis Yerai Eckert Ayensa (Note: Persian: دنیس یرای اکرت آینسا) (born 9 January 1997), also known as Dennis Dargahi, (Note: Persian: دنیس درگاهی. He is known by the surname Dargahi specifically in Iran.) is a professional footballer who plays as a forward and midfielder for Belgian Pro League club Standard Liège. Born in Germany and a former German youth international, he represents the Iran national team.

== Club career ==
=== Early career ===
After stints at Pulheimer SC, 1. FC Köln, and Alemannia Aachen, Eckert joined Borussia Mönchengladbach's youth setup in 2013 and made appearances in the UEFA Youth League. He made his senior debut with the latter's reserve team on 5 September 2015 in a 2–2 Regionalliga home draw against SSVg Velbert.

=== Celta Vigo ===
On 4 July 2017, Eckert joined Celta de Vigo and was initially assigned to the B-team in Segunda División B. He made his first-team debut on 18 August of the following year, coming on as a late substitute for Maxi Gómez in a 1–1 La Liga home draw against RCD Espanyol.

==== Loan to Excelsior ====
On 31 January 2019, Eckert joined Eredivisie side SBV Excelsior until June. He scored the game-winning goal on 17 February in a 2–1 comeback win against FC Emmen for his first top-flight goal.

=== FC Ingolstadt ===
On 2 September 2019, FC Ingolstadt announced the signing of Eckert. He scored a goal and provided an assist in his debut for the club on 15 September 2019. Eckert finished the season with 14 goals in 30 league matches, helping Ingolstadt reach the promotion play-offs. Eckert helped Ingolstadt reach the promotion play-offs again the following season, leading Ingolstadt to the 2. Bundesliga.

=== Royale Union Saint-Gilloise ===
On 20 June 2022, Eckert signed for Belgian side Union SG ahead of their 2022–23 season after scoring 25 goals and providing 15 assists in 78 league matches for Ingolstadt. He scored his first goal for Union in a pre-season match against Feyenoord on 16 July 2022. Eckert made his Belgian Pro League debut on 23 July 2022 in their opening match against Sint-Truiden. He made his senior UEFA competition debut on 9 August 2022 in a 2022–23 UEFA Champions League qualification match against Scottish side Rangers. He scored his first league goal in his following match on 31 August 2022 against Royal Antwerp at the Bosuilstadion.

The following season, Eckert scored the first goal of the league season in the opening match against Anderlecht on 28 July 2023. He scored his first senior European competition goal on 24 August 2023 during the 2023–24 UEFA Europa League play-off match against Lugano. Eckert scored the winning goal on 22 February 2024 against German Bundesliga side Eintracht Frankfurt to help lead Union to the UEFA Europa Conference League round of 16. He scored the winning goal again in the following match on 25 February 2024 during a league game against Standard Liège, keeping his team in first place in the regular season league table. On 9 May 2024, Eckert won his first senior title when Union won the Belgian Cup.

Eckert began the following 2024–25 season with a win against Club Brugge in the 2024 Belgian Super Cup on 20 July 2024, helping Union win their first Belgian Super Cup title. He scored his first league goal of the season during their home opener on 2 August 2024 against Beerschot.

==== Standard Liège (loan) ====
On 6 September 2024, Eckert joined fellow Belgian Pro League side Standard Liège on a season-long loan deal with an option to buy. He scored his first league goal for the club on 20 October 2024 against Charleroi.

=== Standard Liège ===
In March 2025 during the 2024–25 season, Standard Liège exercised the purchase option on Eckert, signing him to a contract with the club that begins in July 2025 and runs until 2028. The following 2025–26 season, Eckert scored a goal during their home opener on 2 August 2025 against Dender at the Stade Maurice Dufrasne in Liège.

== International career ==
=== Youth ===
Eckert has played for the Germany U19 national team.

=== Senior ===
In March 2026, Eckert received his first call up to the Iran national team for friendly matches against Nigeria and Costa Rica. However, he was unable to make a debut appearance in the March friendly matches due to administrative issues and the absence of FIFA approval. On 1 June 2026, Eckert was named in Iran's final squad for the 2026 FIFA World Cup, without having received his FIFA Change of Association approval.

== Personal life ==
Eckert was born and raised in Bonn to a Galician mother and a German father of Iranian descent. He has a brother, Joel, who played college soccer for Cape Breton University. His aunt is Iranian actress Anahita Dargahi. Eckert holds dual German and Spanish citizenship, and is fluent in German, English, and Spanish, while knowing minimal Persian. He received his Iranian citizenship by May 2026 and was given the name Dennis Dargahi.

=== Sponsorship ===
Eckert is outfitted by American sportswear supplier Nike.

== Career statistics ==
=== Club ===
As of match played 6 November 2026

Appearances and goals by club, season and competition
Club	Season	League			National cup (Note: Includes Copa del Rey, DFB-Pokal, Belgian Cup)		Europe		Other		Total	
Club	Season	Division	Apps	Goals	Apps	Goals	Apps	Goals	Apps	Goals	Apps	Goals
Borussia Mönchengladbach II	2015–16	Regionalliga	1	0	—		—		—		1	0
Borussia Mönchengladbach II	2016–17	Regionalliga	3	0	—		—		—		3	0
Borussia Mönchengladbach II	Total		4	0	0	0	0	0	0	0	4	0
Celta B	2017–18	Segunda División B	36	8	—		—		4 (Note: Appearances in Segunda División B play-offs)	0	40	8
Celta B	2018–19	Segunda División B	12	1	—		—		—		12	1
Celta B	Total		48	9	0	0	0	0	4	0	52	9
Celta	2018–19	La Liga	9	0	1	0	—		—		10	0
Excelsior (loan)	2018–19	Eredivisie	12	2	0	0	—		2 (Note: Appearances in Eredivisie relegation play-offs)	0	14	2
FC Ingolstadt	2019–20	3. Liga	30	14	0	0	—		2 (Note: Appearances in 2. Bundesliga relegation play-offs)	0	32	14
FC Ingolstadt	2020–21	3. Liga	24	9	0	0	—		2	1	26	10
FC Ingolstadt	2021–22	2. Bundesliga	24	2	1	0	—		—		25	2
FC Ingolstadt	Total		78	25	1	0	0	0	4	1	83	26
Union SG	2022–23	Belgian Pro League	8	2	3	0	4 (Note: One appearance in UEFA Champions League, three appearances in UEFA Europa League)	0	—		15	2
Union SG	2023–24	Belgian Pro League	31	8	3	0	10 (Note: Four appearances and one goal in UEFA Champions League, six appearances and two goals in UEFA Europa League)	3	—		44	7
Union SG	2024–25	Belgian Pro League	3	1	0	0	2 (Note: Appearance(s) in UEFA Champions League)	0	1 (Note: Appearance(s) in Belgian Super Cup)	0	6	1
Union SG	Total		42	11	6	0	16	3	1	0	65	14
Standard Liège (loan)	2024–25	Belgian Pro League	33	8	2	1	—		—		35	9
Standard Liège	2025–26	Belgian Pro League	35	5	2	2	—		—		37	7
Standard Liège	2026–27	Belgian Pro League	11	7	0	0	—		—		11	7
Standard Liège	Standard Liège total		79	20	4	3	—		—		83	23
Career total			271	65	12	3	16	3	11	1	311	74

=== International ===
As of match played 17 November 2026

Appearances and goals by national team and year
National team	Year	Apps	Goals
Iran
Iran	2026	4	0
Total		4	0

== Honours ==
Union SG

- Belgian Cup: 2023–24
- Belgian Super Cup: 2024

== Notes ==
1. Persian: دنیس یرای اکرت آینسا
2. Persian: دنیس درگاهی. He is known by the surname Dargahi specifically in Iran.
