= Matthieu Epolo =

Congolese professional footballer (born 2005)

Personal information
- Full name: Matthieu Epolo Luka
- Date of birth: 15 January 2005 (age 21)
- Place of birth: Brussels, Belgium
- Height: 1.83 m (6 ft 0 in)
- Position: Goalkeeper

Team information
- Current team: Standard Liège
- Number: 1

Youth career
- Wemmel
- Brussels
- –2019: Anderlecht
- 2019–2024: Standard Liège

Senior career*
Years	Team	Apps	(Gls)
2022–2024	Standard Liège B	40	(0)
2024–	Standard Liège	67	(0)

International career^{‡}
2021–2022	Belgium U17	8	(0)
2022–2023	Belgium U18	2	(0)
2023	Belgium U19	1	(0)
2025	Belgium U21	2	(0)
2025–	DR Congo	3	(0)
- * Club domestic league appearances and goals as of 19 September 2026 ‡ National team caps and goals as of 21:24, 28 September 2026 (UTC)

Matthieu Epolo Luka (born 15 January 2005) is a professional footballer who plays as a goalkeeper for Belgian Pro League club Standard Liège. Born in Belgium, he plays for the DR Congo national team.

Epolo first became known to international football audiences for keeping six clean sheets in his first eight games of the 2024–25 Belgian Pro League season, making him the most successful goalkeeper for shutouts in the top-20 ranked European leagues.

== Club career ==
Epolo began playing football at KVK Wemmel and later FC Brussels. Epolo came through the youth academy of RSC Anderlecht, moving to Standard Liège at the age of 14 in June 2019.

He made his professional debut on 26 August 2022 in the shirt of SL16 FC, the newly launched Standard reserve team playing in the second-flight Challenger Pro League for the 2022–23 season. He started SL16's third match of the season against FCV Dender EH, and ultimately shared game-time with SL16's other main goalkeeper Tom Poitoux, who played 19 games to Epolo's 18.

On 25 January 2023, shortly after his 18th birthday and with him being the third goalkeeper for the first team, Epolo extended his contract.

Epolo was promoted to the first-team for the 2023–24 Belgian Pro League season, and played the final five games of Standard's campaign, due to both transfer speculation and an injury for first-choice goalkeeper Arnaud Bodart. He made his league debut on 27 April 2024 against Sint-Truiden, promoted by manager Ivan Leko, amid reports that regular goalkeeper Bodart would leave at the end of the season.

He enjoyed a 1–1 draw at home to Sint-Truiden on his debut, with 20-year-old Mattéo Godfroid on the bench as Bodart was injured, according to Leko. Fewer than 10,000 fans saw his debut at the Stade Maurice Dufrasne due to a boycott of American owners 777 Partners, a situation Epolo said was understandable. Leko said that Epolo would start the remaining games of the season.

Further transfer speculation saw Bodart kept out of the first-team at the start of the following 2024–25 season, with Epolo starting as regular first-choice goalkeeper as a 19-year-old. Epolo kept clean sheets in Standard's first three games of the season against Racing Genk, Club Brugge and KV Mechelen to give them an unbeaten start.

Epolo went on to keep six clean sheets in his first eight league games of the season with Standard conceding only three goals in that time, scoring four to climb to the top half of the table. This run of clean sheets early in the season put Epolo top of the Belgian Pro League's official clean sheet table, with the best clean sheets record in Europe's top-20 ranked leagues, inspiring Standard to the best defensive record in the Pro League.

== International career ==
Born in Belgium, Epolo is of DR Congolese descent. He was called up to the Belgium under-17 team for the 2022 UEFA European Under-17 Championship in Israel. He played all three games in a group-stage elimination.

On 1 November 2025, Epolo received his maiden call-up to the DR Congo national team for the 2026 FIFA World Cup qualifying play-offs. On 12 November, his request to switch international allegiance to the DR Congo was approved by FIFA. He debuted with the DR Congo in a 2–0 friendly win over Zambia on 16 December 2025.

On May 19, 2026, he was included in the 26-man squad selected by head coach Sébastien Desabre to represent the DR Congo at the 2026 FIFA World Cup.

== Career statistics ==
=== Club ===
As of match played 19 September 2026

Appearances, goals, and clean sheets by club, season, and competition
Club	Season	League			National cup		Continental		Other		Total	
Club	Season	Division	Apps	Goals	Apps	Goals	Apps	Goals	Apps	Goals	Apps	Goals
Standard Liège B	2022–23	Challenger Pro League	15	0	—		—		—		15	0
Standard Liège B	2023–24	Challenger Pro League	25	0	—		—		—		25	0
Standard Liège B	Total		40	0	—		—		—		40	0
Standard Liège	2023–24	Belgian Pro League	4	0	—		—		—		4	0
Standard Liège	2024–25	Belgian Pro League	27	0	2	0	—		—		29	0
Standard Liège	2025–26	Belgian Pro League	29	0	2	0	—		—		31	0
Standard Liège	2026–27	Belgian Pro League	7	0	0	0	—		—		7	0
Standard Liège	Total		67	0	4	0	—		—		71	0
Career total			107	0	4	0	0	0	0	0	111	0

=== International ===
As of match played 28 September 2026

Appearances and goals by national team and year
National team	Year	Apps	Goals
DR Congo	2025	1	0
DR Congo	2026	2	0
Total		3	0
