= Ibe Hautekiet =

Belgian footballer

Personal information
- Date of birth: 13 April 2002 (age 24)
- Place of birth: Kortrijk, Belgium
- Height: 6 ft 2 in (1.87 m)
- Position: Defender

Team information
- Current team: Standard Liège
- Number: 25

Youth career
- Club Brugge

Senior career*
Years	Team	Apps	(Gls)
2020–2023	Club NXT	38	(2)
2023–	Standard Liège	80	(2)
2023–2024	SL16 FC	11	(0)

International career^{‡}
2018	Belgium U16	7	(3)
2018–2019	Belgium U17	10	(0)
2019	Belgium U18	2	(0)
2020	Belgium U19	1	(0)
- * Club domestic league appearances and goals as of 31 May 2026 ‡ National team caps and goals as of 18:41, 2 November 2020 (UTC)

Ibe Hautekiet (born 13 April 2002) is a Belgian professional footballer who plays as a defender for Standard Liège.

== Club career ==
Hautekiet began his career at the youth academy of Club Brugge. On 22 August 2020, Hautekiet made his debut for Brugge's reserve side, Club NXT in the Belgian First Division B against RWDM47. He started as NXT lost 0–2.

On 31 January 2023, Hautekiet signed a four-and-a-half-year contract with Standard Liège.

== Career statistics ==
=== Club ===
As of match played 16 October 2020

Appearances and goals by club, season and competition
Club	Season	League			Cup		Other		Total	
Club	Season	Division	Apps	Goals	Apps	Goals	Apps	Goals	Apps	Goals
Club NXT	2020–21	Belgian First Division B	6	0	—	—	—	—	6	0
Career total			6	0	0	0	0	0	6	0
