= Moreno Živković =

Croatian footballer (born 2004)

Personal information
- Date of birth: 22 May 2004 (age 22)
- Place of birth: Zagreb, Croatia
- Height: 1.84 m (6 ft 0 in)
- Position: Centre-back

Team information
- Current team: Rijeka
- Number: 3

Youth career
- 2011–2023: Dinamo Zagreb

Senior career*
Years	Team	Apps	(Gls)
2020	Dinamo Zagreb II	1	(0)
2023–2026	Dinamo Zagreb	8	(1)
2023–2024	→ Lokomotiva (loan)	10	(1)
2024–2025	→ Lokomotiva (loan)	14	(0)
2026	→ Vukovar 1991 (loan)	14	(0)
2026–	Rijeka	0	(0)

International career^{‡}
2018	Croatia U15	2	(0)
2020	Croatia U17	1	(0)
2021	Croatia U18	2	(0)
2021–2023	Croatia U19	11	(0)
2023–	Croatia U21	5	(0)
- * Club domestic league appearances and goals as of 15 June 2026 ‡ National team caps and goals as of 10 September 2024

Moreno Živković (born 22 May 2004) is a Croatian professional footballer who plays as a centre-back for Croatian club Rijeka.

== Club career ==
Živković started playing in Dinamo's open school at the age of five with fellow Dinamo's players Gabrijel Rukavina and Luka Lukanić and officially was registered in 2011. He debuted for Dinamo Zagreb on 15 April 2023 in their 4–0 over Slaven Belupo. Živković signed a contract through 2026 with Dinamo Zagreb and was sent on loan to fellow Croatian First Football League club Lokomotiva.

== Personal life ==
His father, Boris, was a long-time member of the Croatia national team, notably playing at the 2002 FIFA World Cup and the UEFA Euro 2004.
