= Takuya Ogiwara =

Japanese footballer (born 1999)

Takuya Ogiwara 荻原 拓也
Personal information
- Full name: Takuya Ogiwara
- Date of birth: 23 November 1999 (age 26)
- Place of birth: Kawagoe, Saitama, Japan
- Height: 1.75 m (5 ft 9 in)
- Position: Left-back

Team information
- Current team: Oud-Heverlee Leuven (on loan from Urawa Red Diamonds)
- Number: 26

Youth career
- Urawa Red Diamonds

Senior career*
Years	Team	Apps	(Gls)
2018–	Urawa Red Diamonds	59	(1)
2020	→ Albirex Niigata (loan)	24	(0)
2021−2022	→ Kyoto Sanga (loan)	61	(4)
2024	→ Dinamo Zagreb (loan)	12	(0)
2024	→ Slaven Belupo (loan)	7	(0)
2026−	→ Oud-Heverlee Leuven (loan)	6	(0)
Medal record
Urawa Reds
Winner	Emperor's Cup	2018
Representing Japan
AFC U-19 Championship
Bronze medal – third place	2018 Indonesia
- * Club domestic league appearances and goals as of 11 October 2026

Takuya Ogiwara (荻原 拓也, Ogiwara Takuya; born 23 November 1999) is a Japanese professional footballer who plays as a left-back for Belgian Pro League club Oud-Heverlee Leuven, on loan from J1 League club, Urawa Red Diamonds.

== Career ==
Ogiwara signed to Croatian club, GNK Dinamo Zagreb for mid 2023–24 season on loan.

In 2025, Ogiwara returned to J1 club, Urawa Red Diamonds for 2025 season.

== Career statistics ==
As of the match played 11 October 2026

Appearances and goals by club, season and competition
Club	Season	League			National cup (Note: Includes Emperor's Cup.)		League cup (Note: Includes J. League Cup.)		Continental		Other		Total	
Club	Season	Division	Apps	Goals	Apps	Goals	Apps	Goals	Apps	Goals	Apps	Goals	Apps	Goals
Urawa Red Diamonds	2018	J1 League	8	0	2	0	7	2	—		—		17	2
Urawa Red Diamonds	2019	J1 League	4	0	1	0	2	0	1 (Note: Appearances in the AFC Champions League)	0	—		8	0
Urawa Red Diamonds	2020	J1 League	1	0	0	0	2	0	—		—		3	0
Urawa Red Diamonds	2023	J1 League	28	1	3	0	10	0	—		3 (Note: Appearances in FIFA Intercontinental Cup)	0	44	1
Urawa Red Diamonds	2025	J1 League	26	0	2	0	2	0	—		3 (Note: Appearances in FIFA Club World Cup)	0	33	0
Urawa Red Diamonds	2026	J1 (100)	9	0	—		—		—		—		9	0
Urawa Red Diamonds	Total		76	1	8	0	23	2	1	0	6	0	114	3
Albirex Niigata (loan)	2020	J2 League	24	0	0	0	—		—		—		24	0
Kyoto Sanga (loan)	2021	J2 League	40	2	1	0	—		—		—		41	2
Kyoto Sanga (loan)	2022	J1 League	21	2	0	0	4	0	—		1 (Note: Appearances in the J1/J2 play-offs)	0	26	2
Kyoto Sanga (loan)	Total		61	4	1	0	4	0	—		1	0	67	4
Dinamo Zagreb (loan)	2023–24	Croatian Football League	6	0	3	0	—		2 (Note: Appearances in UEFA Conference League)	0	—		11	0
Dinamo Zagreb (loan)	2024–25	Croatian Football League	6	0	1	0	—		5 (Note: Appearances in UEFA Champions League)	1	—		12	1
Dinamo Zagreb (loan)	Total		12	0	4	0	—		7	1	—		23	1
OH Leuven (loan)	2026–27	Belgian Pro League	6	0	0	0	—		—		—		6	0
Career total			156	5	13	0	27	2	8	1	7	0	210	8

== Honours ==
Urawa Red Diamonds

- Emperor's Cup: 2018
- AFC Champions League: 2022

Dinamo Zagreb

- Croatian Football League: 2023–24
- Croatian Football Cup: 2023–24
