= Yann Gboua =

Belgian footballer (born 2008)

Personal information
- Date of birth: February 26, 2008 (age 18)
- Position: Forward

Team information
- Current team: Standard Liège

Youth career
- Standard Liège

Senior career*
Years	Team	Apps	(Gls)
2024–	SL16 FC	2	(0)
- * Club domestic league appearances and goals as of 25 November 2024

Yann Gboua (born 26 February 2008) is a Belgian professional footballer who plays as a forward for Standard Liège.

== Club career ==
Gboua made his professional debut for SL16 FC, Standard Liège's reserve team, on 19 April 2024 in a Belgian First Division B match against K.V. Oostende, starting the game under coach Réginal Goreux in a 2–1 defeat. At the time, SL16 FC had already been confirmed relegated to the Belgian National Division 1 for around two weeks.

In the summer of 2024, Gboua caught attention by scoring the winning goal for Standard Liège's first team in a friendly match against N.E.C.. On the opening matchday of the 2024–25 season, manager Ivan Leko included him in the squad for the league match against K.R.C. Genk.

== Career statistics ==
Season	Club	Country	League	League		Cup		Supercup		Europe		Total	
Season	Club	Country	League	Apps	Goals	Apps	Goals	Apps	Goals	Apps	Goals	Apps	Goals
2023–24	SL16 FC	Belgium	Belgian First Division B	1	0	—		—		—		1	0
2024–25	SL16 FC	Belgium	National Division 1 ACFF	1	0	—		—		—		1	0
Career total				2	0	0	0	0	0	0	0	2	0

Updated 25 November 2024.
