= Ibrahim Karamoko =

French footballer (born 2001)

Personal information
- Date of birth: 23 July 2001 (age 25)
- Place of birth: Paris, France
- Height: 1.87 m (6 ft 2 in)
- Position: Midfielder

Team information
- Current team: Standard Liège
- Number: 20

Youth career
- –2017: Lille
- 2017–2019: Chievo

Senior career*
Years	Team	Apps	(Gls)
2019–2020	Chievo	7	(0)
2020–2022	Torino	0	(0)
2021–2022	→ Virton (loan)	13	(0)
2022–2023	Guingamp II	20	(2)
2023–2025	Versailles	32	(3)
2025–	Standard Liège	49	(1)
- * Club domestic league appearances and goals as of 31 May 2026

Ibrahim Karamoko (born 23 July 2001) is a French professional footballer who plays as midfielder for Belgian Pro League club Standard Liège.

== Career ==
=== Chievo ===
On 7 March 2019, Karamoko signed his first professional contract with Chievo. He made his professional debut for Chievo in a 1–1 Serie A tie with on 28 April 2019.

=== Torino ===
On 5 October 2020, Karamoko signed with Serie A club Torino a deal.

=== Standard Liège ===
On 7 January 2025, Karamoko signed for Belgian Pro League side Standard Liège on a three-and-a-half year deal.

== Personal life ==
Born in France, Karamoko is of Ivorian descent.
