= Faris Krkalić =

Bosnia and Herzegovinan footballer (born 2002)

Personal information
- Date of birth: 15 June 2002 (age 24)
- Place of birth: Sarajevo, Bosnia and Herzegovina
- Height: 1.88 m (6 ft 2 in)
- Position: Goalkeeper

Team information
- Current team: Ilves
- Number: 12

Youth career
- –2018: FK Sarajevo
- 2018–2020: Dinamo Zagreb

Senior career*
Years	Team	Apps	(Gls)
2020–2023	Dinamo Zagreb II	0	(0)
2020–2022	→ Sesvete (loan)	41	(0)
2023	→ Kustošija (loan)	3	(0)
2023–2025	Dinamo Zagreb	1	(0)
2025–	Ilves	36	(0)
2025–	Ilves II	1	(0)

International career
2017	Bosnia and Herzegovina U15	4	(0)
2018	Bosnia and Herzegovina U17	4	(0)
2019	Bosnia and Herzegovina U18	1	(0)
- * Club domestic league appearances and goals as of 29 October 2026

Faris Krkalić (born 15 June 2002) is a Bosnia and Herzegovinan professional footballer who plays as a goalkeeper for Veikkausliiga club Ilves.

== Club career ==
Krkalić started football in a youth sector of FK Sarajevo, before moving to Dinamo Zagreb organisation in 2018. He signed a professional contract with Dinamo in June 2020.

During 2020–22, he was loaned out ot Sesvete in Croatian second-tier Prva NL, making 41 appearances in the division.

In early 2023, he played briefly for Kustošija in Prva NL, again on a loan deal.

In March 2025, Krkalić moved to Finland and signed with Ilves in Veikkausliiga. He debuted in the league on 27 April, after replacing a sent-off Otso Virtanen on the 7th minute of the match against IFK Mariehamn at the Wiklöf Holding Arena. On 23 December, Krkalić signed a new three-year deal with the club, valid until the end of 2028.

== International career ==
Krkalić has represented Bosnia and Herzegovina at under-15, under-17 and under-18 youth international levels.

== Career statistics ==
As of 19 October 2026

Appearances and goals by club, season and competition
Club	Season	League			National cup (Note: Includes Croatian Cup and Finnish Cup)		Europe		Other (Note: Includes Finnish League Cup)		Total	
Club	Season	Division	Apps	Goals	Apps	Goals	Apps	Goals	Apps	Goals	Apps	Goals
Sesvete (loan)	2020–21	Prva NL	20	0	1	0	–		–		21	0
Sesvete (loan)	2021–22	Prva NL	21	0	2	0	–		–		23	0
Sesvete (loan)	Total		41	0	3	0	0	0	0	0	44	0
Kustošija (loan)	2022–23	Prva NL	1	0	0	0	–		2	0	3	0
Dinamo Zagreb	2023–24	HNL	1	0	0	0	0	0	–		1	0
Dinamo Zagreb	2024–25	HNL	0	0	0	0	0	0	–		0	0
Dinamo Zagreb	Total		1	0	0	0	0	0	0	0	1	0
Ilves	2025	Veikkausliiga	13	0	1	0	0	0	0	0	14	0
Ilves	2026	Veikkausliiga	23	0	2	0	6 (Note: Appearances in UEFA Conference League qualifying phase)	0	3	0	34	0
Ilves	Total		36	0	3	0	6	0	3	0	48	0
Ilves II	2025	Kakkonen	1	0	–		–		–		1	0
Career total			80	0	6	0	6	0	5	0	97	0
