= Léandre Kuavita =

Belgian football player (born 2004)

Personal information
- Full name: Léandre Filipe Kuavita
- Date of birth: 31 May 2004 (age 22)
- Place of birth: Ensival, Belgium
- Height: 1.80 m (5 ft 11 in)
- Position: Midfielder

Team information
- Current team: Beveren

Youth career
- Verviétois
- 2015–2018: Verviers
- 2018–2019: Eupen
- 2019–2021: Standard Liège
- 2023–2024: Genoa (loan)

Senior career*
| Years | Team | Apps | (Gls) |
| 2022–2024 | Standard Liège B | 38 | (3) |
| 2022–2026 | Standard Liège | 55 | (1) |
| 2023–2024 | → Genoa (loan) | 0 | (0) |
| 2026– | Beveren | 0 | (0) |

International career
| 2019 | Belgium U16 | 3 | (1) |
| 2021–2022 | Belgium U18 | 9 | (1) |
| 2022–2023 | Belgium U19 | 4 | (0) |
- * Club domestic league appearances and goals as of 31 May 2026

Léandre Filipe Kuavita (born 31 May 2004) is a Belgian professional footballer who plays as a midfielder for Belgian Pro League club Beveren.

== Club career ==
Kuavita was born in Ensival near Verviers to an Angolan father and a Congolese mother, and began his youth career at local club R.C.S. Verviétois. In 2019, he moved from K.A.S. Eupen to Standard Liège.

At the start of 2022–23, 18-year-old Kuavita started all 14 games for the reserve team in the third-tier Belgian National Division 1, scoring three goals and assisting one. In November, he signed a new contract of undisclosed terms. He made his first-team debut in the Belgian Pro League on 23 December in a goalless draw at K.R.C. Gent, playing the last six minutes as a substitute for Gojko Cimirot.

Having made only one more professional appearance for Standard, Kuavita was loaned to Genoa C.F.C. of Serie A on 1 September 2023 without the option to purchase, with both clubs being owned by American firm 777 Partners. At the end of January 2024, his loan was ended by mutual consent, having played 12 games for the under-19 team. Before his departure, he was an unused substitute for the first team in a goalless draw at Empoli F.C. on 3 February.

Due to financial problems, Kuavita was one of several young players given starting roles at Standard in 2024–25 under manager Ivan Leko. He played without a name on his shirt as he was not expected to be playing regularly. On 30 October, he scored his first professional goal to open a 3–2 extra time win over third-tier Lyra-Lierse Berlaar in the seventh round of the Belgian Cup.

On 20 July 2026, Kuavita signed a two-season contract with Beveren.
