= 2015–16 KAA Gent season =

Gent
2015–16 season
- Manager: Hein Vanhaezebrouck
- Stadium: Ghelamco Arena
- Belgian Pro League: 3rd
- Belgian Cup: Semi-finals
- Belgian Super Cup: Winners
- UEFA Champions League: Round of 16
Home colours	Away colours	Third colours

The 2015–16 season was Koninklijke Atletiek Associatie Gent's 27th consecutive season in the Belgian Pro League and 113th year in existence as a football club. In addition to the domestic league, Gent participated in that season's editions of the Belgian Cup, the Belgian Super Cup and the UEFA Champions League.

== Squad ==
As of 10 March 2016

Note: Flags indicate national team as defined under FIFA eligibility rules; some limited exceptions apply. Players may hold more than one non-FIFA nationality.

No.	Pos.	Nation	Player
1	GK	BEL	Matz Sels
4	MF	BRA	Rafinha
6	FW	MAR	Mbark Boussoufa
7	FW	MLI	Kalifa Coulibaly
8	MF	BEL	Thomas Matton
9	FW	BEL	Laurent Depoitre
10	MF	BRA	Renato Neto
11	FW	SEN	Simon Diedhiou
13	DF	SRB	Stefan Mitrović
14	MF	BEL	Sven Kums
15	MF	ISR	Kenny Saief
16	MF	BEL	Rob Schoofs
17	MF	BEL	Hannes Van der Bruggen

No.	Pos.	Nation	Player
18	MF	FRA	Lucas Deaux
19	MF	BEL	Brecht Dejaegere
20	GK	BEL	Yannick Thoelen
21	DF	GHA	Nana Akwasi Asare
22	FW	NOR	Gustav Wikheim
23	DF	DEN	Lasse Nielsen
25	GK	BEL	Brian Vandenbussche
27	FW	NGR	Moses Simon
29	DF	ISR	Hatem Abd Elhamed
32	DF	BEL	Thomas Foket
55	DF	ISR	Rami Gershon
77	MF	BIH	Danijel Milićević
99	FW	NGR	Peter Olayinka

== Competitions ==
=== Overview ===
Competition	First match	Last match	Starting round	Final position	Record							
Competition	First match	Last match	Starting round	Final position	Pld	W	D	L	GF	GA	GD	Win %
Belgian Pro League	26 July 2015	22 May 2016	Matchday 1	3rd	40	20	12	8	66	44	+22	50.00
Belgian Cup	23 September 2015	3 February 2016	Sixth round	Semi-finals	5	4	0	1	7	2	+5	80.00
Belgian Super Cup	16 July 2015		Final	Winners	1	1	0	0	1	0	+1	100.00
UEFA Champions League	16 September 2015	8 March 2016	Group stage	Round of 16	8	3	1	4	10	11	−1	37.50
Total					54	28	13	13	84	57	+27	51.85

Source: Competitions

=== Belgian Super Cup ===
16 July 2015 Final	Gent	1–0	Club Brugge	Ghent
20:30 CEST (UTC+2)	Neto (yellow card) 45+1'; Rafinha (yellow card) 75'; Depoitre 87', (yellow card) 90'	Report	Denswil (yellow card) 75'; Oularé (yellow card) 90+1'	Stadium: Ghelamco Arena; Referee: Erik Lambrechts

=== Belgian Pro League ===
==== Results summary ====
Overall								Home						Away					
Pld	W	D	L	GF	GA	GD	Pts	W	D	L	GF	GA	GD	W	D	L	GF	GA	GD
40	20	12	8	66	44	+22	72	11	7	2	40	20	+20	9	5	6	26	24	+2

Source: Competitions

==== Regular season ====
===== League table =====
Pos	Team	Pld	W	D	L	GF	GA	GD	Pts	Qualification or relegation
1	Club Brugge	30	21	1	8	64	30	+34	64	Qualification for the Championship play-offs
2	Gent	30	17	9	4	56	29	+27	60	Qualification for the Championship play-offs
3	Anderlecht	30	15	10	5	51	29	+22	55	Qualification for the Championship play-offs
4	Oostende	30	14	7	9	55	44	+11	49	Qualification for the Championship play-offs
5	Genk	30	14	6	10	42	30	+12	48	Qualification for the Championship play-offs

Source: Belgian Pro League, Soccerway
Rules for classification: 1) Points; 2) Matches won; 3) Goal difference; 4) Goals scored; 5) Away goals scored; 6) Away matches won; 7) Play-off.

===== Matches =====
26 July 2015 1	Westerlo	1–1	Gent	Westerlo
14:30 CEST (UTC+2)	Aoulad 20'	Report	Saief 45+1' (pen.)	Stadium: Het Kuipje; Referee: Luc Wouters

31 July 2015 2	Gent	1–0	Genk	Ghent
20:30 CEST (UTC+2)	Kums 43' (pen.)	Report		Stadium: Ghelamco Arena; Referee: Alexandre Boucaut

9 August 2015 3	Anderlecht	1–1	Gent	Anderlecht
14:30 CEST (UTC+2)	Sylla 12'	Report	Depoitre 60'	Stadium: Constant Vanden Stock Stadium; Referee: Bart Vertenten

16 August 2015 4	Gent	1–0	Sint-Truiden	Ghent
18:00 CEST (UTC+2)	Depoitre 28'	Report		Stadium: Ghelamco Arena; Referee: Johan Verbist

23 August 2015 5	Kortrijk	0–0	Gent	Kortrijk
20:00 CEST (UTC+2)		Report		Stadium: Guldensporen Stadion; Referee: Sébastien Delferière

29 August 2015 6	Gent	2–2	Mechelen	Ghent
20:30 CEST (UTC+2)	Depoitre 49', 90+3'	Report	Veselinović 7'; Rits 55'	Stadium: Ghelamco Arena; Referee: Luc Wouters

12 September 2015 7	Zulte Waregem	1–1	Gent	Waregem
18:00 CEST (UTC+2)	Leye 74'	Report	Raman 45' (pen.)	Stadium: Regenboogstadion; Referee: Joeri Van de Velde

20 September 2015 8	Gent	4–1	Standard Liège	Ghent
14:30 CEST (UTC+2)	Kums 42'; Milićević 45+2'; Matton 62', 90'	Report	Knockaert 2'	Stadium: Ghelamco Arena; Referee: Erik Lambrechts

26 September 2015 9	Waasland-Beveren	1–3	Gent	Beveren
18:00 CEST (UTC+2)	Milošević 89'	Report	Mitrović 15'; Matton 71'; Depoitre 75'	Stadium: Freethiel Stadion; Referee: Jonathan Lardot

4 October 2015 10	Gent	4–1	Club Brugge	Ghent
14:30 CEST (UTC+2)	Kums 15' (pen.), 51' (pen.), 62'; Depoitre 72'	Report	Vormer 76'	Stadium: Ghelamco Arena; Referee: Johan Verbist

16 October 2015 11	Mouscron-Péruwelz	1–2	Gent	Mouscron
20:30 CEST (UTC+2)	Dussenne 7'	Report	Oussalah 69' (o.g.); Kums 78' (pen.)	Stadium: Stade Le Canonnier; Referee: Luc Wouters

24 October 2015 12	Gent	2–2	Oostende	Ghent
20:30 CEST (UTC+2)	Milićević 54'; Matton 75'	Report	Vandendriessche 60'; Siani 90'	Stadium: Ghelamco Arena; Referee: Jonathan Lardot

27 October 2015 13	Lokeren	1–2	Gent	Lokeren
20:30 CET (UTC+1)	Mirić 65'	Report	Raman 18'; Neto 58'	Stadium: Daknamstadion; Referee: Bart Vertenten

31 October 2015 14	OH Leuven	0–2	Gent	Heverlee
18:00 CET (UTC+1)		Report	Coulibaly 3'; Dejaegere 47'	Stadium: Den Dreef; Referee: Frederik Geldhof

8 November 2015 15	Gent	1–3	Charleroi	Ghent
20:00 CET (UTC+1)	Saief 28'	Report	Perbet 23', 61'; Nielsen 25' (o.g.)	Stadium: Ghelamco Arena; Referee: Serge Gumienny

20 November 2015 16	Gent	5–0	Westerlo	Ghent
20:30 CET (UTC+1)	Coulibaly 4'; Dejaegere 23'; Raman 58'; Kums 68' (pen.), 77'	Report		Stadium: Ghelamco Arena; Referee: Wim Smet

28 November 2015 17	Genk	0–1	Gent	Genk
18:00 CET (UTC+1)		Report	Milićević 21'	Stadium: Cristal Arena; Referee: Sébastien Delferière

4 December 2015 18	Gent	2–2	Zulte Waregem	Ghent
20:30 CET (UTC+1)	Kums 39' (pen.); Simon 90+4'	Report	Lepoint 22'; De Ridder 50'	Stadium: Ghelamco Arena; Referee: Luc Wouters

13 December 2015 19	Sint-Truiden	0–2	Gent	Sint-Truiden
18:00 CET (UTC+1)		Report	Dejaegere 45'; Van der Bruggen 90+1'	Stadium: Stayen; Referee: Joeri Van de Velde

20 December 2015 20	Gent	3–0	Kortrijk	Ghent
20:00 CET (UTC+1)	Simon 35'; Kums 57' (pen.); Chanot 71' (o.g.)	Report		Stadium: Ghelamco Arena; Referee: Wim Smet

26 December 2015 21	Mechelen	2–0	Gent	Mechelen
20:00 CET (UTC+1)	Hanni 56'; Matthys 62'	Report		Stadium: AFAS-stadion Achter de Kazerne; Referee: Jonathan Lardot

17 January 2016 22	Gent	2–0	Anderlecht	Ghent
14:30 CET (UTC+1)	Depoitre 10', 89'	Report		Stadium: Ghelamco Arena; Referee: Sébastien Delferière

24 January 2016 23	Standard Liège	0–3	Gent	Liège
18:00 CET (UTC+1)		Report	Depoitre 49'; Kums 55'; Dejaegere 70'	Stadium: Stade Maurice Dufrasne; Referee: Joeri Van de Velde

31 January 2016 24	Gent	2–1	Waasland-Beveren	Ghent
20:00 CET (UTC+1)	Depoitre 18'; Dejaegere 70'	Report		Stadium: Ghelamco Arena; Referee: Nicolas Laforge

7 February 2016 25	Club Brugge	1–0	Gent	Bruges
14:30 CET (UTC+1)	Refaelov 59' (pen.)	Report		Stadium: Jan Breydel Stadium; Referee: Sébastien Delferière

12 February 2016 26	Gent	2–0	Mouscron-Péruwelz	Ghent
20:30 CET (UTC+1)	Boussoufa 85'; Milićević 90+1'	Report		Stadium: Ghelamco Arena; Referee: Erik Lambrechts

21 February 2016 27	Oostende	5–2	Gent	Ostend
14:30 CET (UTC+1)	Jonckheere 12', 54'; Milić 15'; Musona 36'; El Ghanassy 90+1'	Report	Kums 7' (pen.); Depoitre 41'	Stadium: Albertpark; Referee: Wim Smet

26 February 2016 28	Gent	3–1	Lokeren	Ghent
20:30 CET (UTC+1)	Neto 10'; Dejaegere 38'; Depoitre 90'	Report	Harbaoui 42' (pen.)	Stadium: Ghelamco Arena; Referee: Serge Gumienny

4 March 2016 29	Gent	1–1	OH Leuven	Ghent
20:30 CET (UTC+1)	Boussoufa 68'	Report	Trossard 52'	Stadium: Ghelamco Arena; Referee: Bart Vertenten

13 March 2016 30	Charleroi	1–1	Gent	Charleroi
18:00 CET (UTC+1)	Perbet 49'	Report	Dejaegere 55'	Stadium: Stade du Pays de Charleroi; Referee: Frederik Geldhof

==== Championship play-offs ====
===== Play-off table =====
Pos	Team	Pld	W	D	L	GF	GA	GD	Pts	Qualification	CLU	AND	GNT	GNK	OOS	ZWA
1	Club Brugge (C)	10	7	1	2	25	9	+16	54	Qualification for the Champions League group stage	—	4–0	2–0	3–1	2–2	5–0
2	Anderlecht	10	6	1	3	15	16	−1	47	Qualification for the Champions League third qualifying round	1–0	—	2–0	1–0	2–1	2–0
3	Gent	10	3	3	4	10	15	−5	42	Qualification for the Europa League third qualifying round	1–4	1–1	—	0–0	2–0	1–1
4	Genk (O)	10	5	1	4	20	13	+7	40	Qualification for the play-off final	4–2	5–2	1–2	—	4–0	2–0
5	Oostende	10	3	2	5	14	19	−5	36		0–1	4–2	0–1	2–1	—	3–3
6	Zulte Waregem	10	1	2	7	11	23	−12	27		0–2	1–2	4–2	1–2	1–2	—

Source: Belgian Pro League, Soccerway
Rules for classification: 1) Points; 2) Points without (possible) half points added due to rounding; 3) Matches won; 4) Goal difference; 5) Goals scored; 6) Away goals scored; 7) Away matches won; 8) Play-off.
(C) Champions; (O) Play-off winners

===== Matches =====
1 April 2016 1	Gent	1–1	Zulte Waregem	Ghent
20:30 CEST (UTC+2)	Kums 57'	Report	Leye 35'	Stadium: Ghelamco Arena; Referee: Erik Lambrechts

9 April 2016 2	Club Brugge	2–0	Gent	Bruges
18:00 CEST (UTC+2)	Mitrović 80' (o.g.); Izquierdo 90+3'	Report		Stadium: Jan Breydel Stadium; Referee: Sébastien Delferière

15 April 2016 3	Gent	2–0	Oostende	Ghent
20:30 CEST (UTC+2)	Matton 19'; Simon 87'	Report		Stadium: Ghelamco Arena; Referee: Luc Wouters

21 April 2016 4	Gent	1–1	Anderlecht	Ghent
20:30 CEST (UTC+2)	Saief 68' (pen.)	Report	Nuytinck 64'	Stadium: Ghelamco Arena; Referee: Bart Vertenten

24 April 2016 5	Genk	1–2	Gent	Genk
20:30 CEST (UTC+2)	Bailey 16'	Report	Depoitre 23'; Neto 90+2' (pen.)	Stadium: Cristal Arena; Referee: Alexandre Boucaut

1 May 2016 6	Anderlecht	2–0	Gent	Anderlecht
14:30 CEST (UTC+2)	Mbodji 38'; Acheampong 87'	Report		Stadium: Constant Vanden Stock Stadium; Referee: Serge Gumienny

8 May 2016 7	Gent	1–4	Club Brugge	Ghent
18:00 CEST (UTC+2)	Depoitre 27'	Report	Vanaken 31', 58'; Izquierdo 53'; Gershon 67' (o.g.)	Stadium: Ghelamco Arena; Referee: Sébastien Delferière

15 May 2016 8	Zulte Waregem	4–2	Gent	Waregem
18:00 CEST (UTC+2)	Diallo 22'; Lepoint 68'; Leye 80', 90'	Report	Saief 24' (pen.); Coulibaly 40'	Stadium: Regenboogstadion; Referee: Bart Vertenten

19 May 2016 9	Oostende	0–1	Gent	Roeselare
20:30 CEST (UTC+2)		Report	Coulibaly 84'	Stadium: Schiervelde Stadion; Referee: Wim Smet

22 May 2016 10	Gent	0–0	Genk	Ghent
14:30 CEST (UTC+2)		Report		Stadium: Ghelamco Arena; Referee: Bart Vertenten

=== Belgian Cup ===
23 September 2015 Sixth round	Gent	3–0	Eupen	Ghent
20:30 CEST (UTC+2)	Pedersen 43'; Raman 63'; Van der Bruggen 90+1'	Report		Stadium: Ghelamco Arena; Referee: Denis Vanbecelaere

1 December 2015 Seventh round	Gent	1–0	Zulte Waregem	Ghent
20:30 CET (UTC+1)	Raman 20'	Report		Stadium: Ghelamco Arena; Referee: Bart Vertenten

16 December 2015 Quarter-finals	Gent	1–0	Mechelen	Ghent
20:45 CET (UTC+1)	Dejaegere 10'	Report		Stadium: Ghelamco Arena; Referee: Sébastien Delferière

==== Semi-finals ====
21 January 2016 First leg	Gent	2–1	Club Brugge	Ghent
20:45 CET (UTC+1)	Dejaegere 59'; Kums 90+2'	Report	Diaby 38'	Stadium: Ghelamco Arena; Referee: Luc Wouters

3 February 2016 Second leg	Club Brugge	1–0 ((a) 2–2 agg.)	Gent	Bruges
20:45 CET (UTC+1)	Diaby 21'	Report		Stadium: Jan Breydel Stadium; Referee: Johan Verbist
Note: 2–2 on aggregate. Club Brugge won on away goals.

=== UEFA Champions League ===
==== Group stage ====
Pos	Team	Pld	W	D	L	GF	GA	GD	Pts	Qualification	ZEN	GNT	VAL	LYO
1	(Russia) Zenit Saint Petersburg	6	5	0	1	13	6	+7	15	Advance to knockout phase	—	2–1	2–0	3–1
2	(Belgium) Gent	6	3	1	2	8	7	+1	10	Advance to knockout phase	2–1	—	1–0	1–1
3	(Spain) Valencia	6	2	0	4	5	9	−4	6	Transfer to Europa League	2–3	2–1	—	0–2
4	(France) Lyon	6	1	1	4	5	9	−4	4		0–2	1–2	0–1	—

Source: UEFA
Rules for classification: Group stage tiebreakers

16 September 2015 1	Gent (Belgium)	1–1	(France) Lyon	Ghent, Belgium
20:45 CEST (UTC+2)	Dejaegere (red card) 41'; Milićević 68'; Depoitre (yellow card) 71'; Foket (red card) 87'	Report	Ferri (yellow card) 11'; Jallet 58'; Umtiti (yellow card) 71'; Lacazette (penalty missed) 88'; Malbranque (yellow card) 90+1'	Stadium: Ghelamco Arena; Attendance: 19,601; Referee: Willie Collum (Scotland)

29 September 2015 2	Zenit Saint Petersburg (Russia)	2–1	(Belgium) Gent	Saint Petersburg, Russia
21:45 MSK (UTC+3)	Dzyuba 35'; García (yellow card) 60'; Shatov 67'	Report	Depoitre (yellow card) 42'; Matton 56'; Saief (yellow card) 88'; Pedersen (yellow card) 90'	Stadium: Petrovsky Stadium; Attendance: 18,095; Referee: Matej Jug (Slovenia)

20 October 2015 3	Valencia (Spain)	2–1	(Belgium) Gent	Valencia, Spain
20:45 CEST (UTC+2)	Feghouli 15'; Parejo (yellow card) 18'; Mina (yellow card) 46'; Cancelo (yellow card) 55'; Mitrović 72' (o.g.); Gayà (yellow card) 90'	Report	Asare (yellow card) 22'; Foket 40', (yellow card) 70'; Saief (yellow card) 66'; Simon (yellow card) 86'	Stadium: Mestalla; Attendance: 38,207; Referee: Felix Zwayer (Germany)

4 November 2015 4	Gent (Belgium)	1–0	(Spain) Valencia	Ghent, Belgium
20:45 CET (UTC+1)	Kums 49' (pen.); Raman (yellow card) 73'	Report	Feghouli (yellow card) 30'; Mustafi (yellow card) 62'; Gomes (yellow card) 72'; Pérez (yellow card) 85'	Stadium: Ghelamco Arena; Attendance: 19,452; Referee: Daniele Orsato (Italy)

24 November 2015 5	Lyon (France)	1–2	(Belgium) Gent	Lyon, France
20:45 CET (UTC+1)	Ferri 7', (yellow card) 48'; Bedimo (yellow card) 38'	Report	Nielsen (yellow card) 16'; Neto (yellow card) 25'; Milićević 32'; Foket (yellow card) 58'; Kums (yellow card) 75'; Asare (yellow card) 87'; Raman (yellow card) 90+3'; Coulibaly 90+5'	Stadium: Stade de Gerland; Attendance: 30,206; Referee: Sergei Karasev (Russia)

9 December 2015 6	Gent (Belgium)	2–1	(Russia) Zenit Saint Petersburg	Ghent, Belgium
20:45 CET (UTC+1)	Depoitre 18'; Milićević 78', (yellow card) 79'; Mitrović (yellow card) 90+2'	Report	Garay (yellow card) 44'; Dzyuba 65'; García (yellow card) 75'; Yusupov (yellow card) 77'; Lodygin (yellow card) 79'; Lombaerts (yellow card) 89'; Danny (yellow card) 90+2'	Stadium: Ghelamco Arena; Attendance: 19,978; Referee: Jorge Sousa (Portugal)

==== Kockoout phase ====
===== Round of 16 =====
17 February 2016 First leg	Gent (Belgium)	2–3	(Germany) VfL Wolfsburg	Ghent, Belgium
20:45 CET (UTC+1)	Kums (yellow card) 59', (goal) 80'; Coulibaly 89'	Report	Draxler 44', 54'; Luiz Gustavo (yellow card) 47'; Vieirinha (yellow card) 48'; Kruse 60'	Stadium: Ghelamco Arena; Attendance: 19,978; Referee: Svein Oddvar Moen (Norway)

8 March 2016 Second leg	VfL Wolfsburg (Germany)	1–0 (4–2 agg.)	(Belgium) Gent	Wolfsburg, Germany
20:45 CET (UTC+1)	Schürrle 74'	Report		Stadium: Volkswagen Arena; Attendance: 23,457; Referee: Damir Skomina (Slovenia)
Note: VfL Wolfsburg won 4–2 on aggregate.
