= 2017–18 KAA Gent season =

Gent
2017–18 season
- Chairman: Ivan De Witte
- Managing director: Michel Louwagie
- Manager: Hein Vanhaezebrouck (until 27 September); Yves Vanderhaeghe (from 4 October)
- Stadium: Ghelamco Arena
- First Division A: 4th
- Belgian Cup: Quarter-finals
- UEFA Europa League: Third qualifying round
- Top goalscorer: League: Jérémy Perbet (10); All: Jérémy Perbet (10)
Home colours	Away colours	Third colours

The 2017–18 season was the 115th season in the history of K.A.A. Gent and the club's 29th consecutive season in the top flight of Belgian football. In addition to the domestic league, Gent participated in this season's editions of the Belgian Cup and the UEFA Europa League.

== Players ==
=== First-team squad ===
Note: Flags indicate national team as defined under FIFA eligibility rules; some limited exceptions apply. Players may hold more than one non-FIFA nationality.

No.	Pos.	Nation	Player
2	DF	FRA	Samuel Gigot
4	DF	NOR	Sigurd Rosted
5	DF	BEL	Noë Dussenne
6	MF	BEL	Birger Verstraete
7	MF	GEO	Giorgi Chakvetadze
8	MF	DEN	Anders Christiansen
9	FW	SEN	Mamadou Sylla Diallo
10	MF	BRA	Renato Neto (Vice-captain)
11	DF	COL	Deiver Machado
12	GK	BEL	Anthony Swolfs
13	DF	SRB	Stefan Mitrović
14	FW	CUW	Rangelo Janga
17	FW	UKR	Roman Yaremchuk
18	FW	NGR	Samuel Kalu

No.	Pos.	Nation	Player
19	MF	BEL	Brecht Dejaegere
20	GK	BEL	Yannick Thoelen
21	DF	GHA	Nana Akwasi Asare (Captain)
22	DF	TUN	Dylan Bronn
23	MF	CRO	Franko Andrijašević
27	FW	NGR	Moses Simon
28	FW	BEL	Aboubakary Koita
29	DF	BEL	Thibault De Smet
31	FW	JPN	Yuya Kubo
32	MF	BEL	Thomas Foket
38	DF	BEL	Siebe Horemans
44	MF	NGR	Anderson Esiti
91	GK	CRO	Lovre Kalinić

==== Out on loan ====
Note: Flags indicate national team as defined under FIFA eligibility rules; some limited exceptions apply. Players may hold more than one non-FIFA nationality.

No.	Pos.	Nation	Player
3	MF	BEL	Lucas Schoofs
—	DF	ISR	Ofir Davidzada (at Maccabi Tel Aviv)
—	FW	NGR	Peter Olayinka (at Zulte Waregem)
—	FW	GEO	Giorgi Beridze (at Trenčín)
—	MF	USA	Kenny Saief (at Anderlecht)
-	FW	ISR	Lior Inebrum (at F.C. Ashdod)

== Pre-season and friendlies ==
Win Draw Loss

30 June 2017 Friendly	Dikkelvenne (Belgium)	2–7	(Belgium) Gent	Belgium
19:30 CEST (UTC+2)

7 July 2017 Friendly	Gent (Belgium)	2–0	(Greece) PAOK	Horst, Netherlands
16:00 CEST (UTC+2)	Matton 31'; Mamadou Sylla 86'			Stadium: Molenstraat

13 July 2017 Friendly	Gent (Belgium)	2–3	(France) Nice	Ghent, Belgium
20:30 CEST (UTC+2)				Stadium: Ghelamco Arena

19 July 2017 Friendly	AEK Athens (Greece)	1–1	(Belgium) Gent	Marousi, Greece
20:30 EEST (UTC+3)	Mantalos 73'		Andrijašević 37'; Marcq (yellow card) 53'	Stadium: Olympic Stadium; Referee: Aristidis Vatsios

21 July 2017 Friendly	Lens (France)	1–3	(Belgium) Gent	France
20:00 CEST (UTC+2)

22 July 2017 Friendly	Beerschot (Belgium)	2–3	(Belgium) Gent	Belgium
16:30 CEST (UTC+2)

9 January 2018 Friendly	Gent (Belgium)	1–0	(Germany) 1. FC Nürnberg	Oliva, Spain
15:30 CET (UTC+1)				Stadium: Oliva Nova Beach & Golf Resort; Attendance: 200

10 January 2018 Friendly	Union Berlin (Germany)	3–1	(Belgium) Gent	Oliva, Spain
15:00 CET (UTC+1)	Polter 50'; Hedlund 54'; Hosiner 81'		Esiti 12'	Stadium: Oliva Nova Beach & Golf Resort; Attendance: 350

== Competitions ==
=== Overall record ===
Competition	First match	Last match	Starting round	Final position	Record							
Competition	First match	Last match	Starting round	Final position	Pld	W	D	L	GF	GA	GD	Win %
First Division A	30 July 2017	20 May 2018	Matchday 1	4th	40	18	10	12	53	35	+18	45.00
Belgian Cup	20 September 2017	12 December 2017	Sixth round	Quarter-finals	3	2	0	1	6	7	−1	66.67
Europa League	27 July 2017	3 August 2022	Third qualifying round	Third qualifying round	2	0	1	1	2	4	−2	0.00
Total					45	20	11	14	61	46	+15	44.44

Source: Soccerway

=== First Division A ===
==== Regular season ====
Pos	Team	Pld	W	D	L	GF	GA	GD	Pts	Qualification or relegation
2	Anderlecht	30	16	7	7	49	42	+7	55	Qualification for the championship play-offs
3	Charleroi	30	13	12	5	46	30	+16	51	Qualification for the championship play-offs
4	Gent	30	14	8	8	45	27	+18	50	Qualification for the championship play-offs
5	Genk	30	11	11	8	44	36	+8	44	Qualification for the championship play-offs
6	Standard Liège	30	11	11	8	43	41	+2	44	Qualification for the championship play-offs

Source: Belgian First Division A (in Dutch), Soccerway
Rules for classification: 1) Points; 2) Matches won; 3) Goal difference; 4) Goals scored; 5) Away goals scored; 6) Away matches won; 7) Play-off.

==== Matches ====
30 July 2017 1	Sint-Truiden	3–2	Gent	Sint-Truiden
CEST (UTC+2)				Stadium: Stayen

6 August 2017 2	Gent	0–1	Antwerp	Ghent
CEST (UTC+2)				Stadium: Ghelamco Arena

12 August 2017 3	Mechelen	1–1	Gent	Mechelen
CEST (UTC+2)				Stadium: AFAS-stadion Achter de Kazerne

20 August 2017 4	Excel Mouscron	3–2	Gent	Mouscron
CEST (UTC+2)				Stadium: Stade Le Canonnier

27 August 2017 5	Gent	0–0	Anderlecht	Ghent
CEST (UTC+2)				Stadium: Ghelamco Arena

10 September 2017 6	Gent	1–1	Genk	Ghent
CEST (UTC+2)				Stadium: Ghelamco Arena

17 September 2017 7	Oostende	0–2	Gent	Ostend
CEST (UTC+2)				Stadium: Versluys Arena

24 September 2017 8	Gent	0–1	Zulte Waregem	Ghent
CEST (UTC+2)				Stadium: Ghelamco Arena

1 October 2017 9	Club Brugge	2–1	Gent	Bruges
CEST (UTC+2)				Stadium: Jan Breydel Stadium

14 October 2017 10	Gent	2–0	Waasland-Beveren	Ghent
CEST (UTC+2)				Stadium: Ghelamco Arena

21 October 2017 11	Kortrijk	1–1	Gent	Kortrijk
CEST (UTC+2)				Stadium: Guldensporen Stadion

24 October 2017 12	Gent	3–0	Eupen	Ghent
CEST (UTC+2)				Stadium: Ghelamco Arena

27 October 2017 13	Charleroi	2–1	Gent	Charleroi
CEST (UTC+2)				Stadium: Stade du Pays de Charleroi

3 November 2017 14	Gent	1–0	Standard Liège	Ghent
CEST (UTC+2)				Stadium: Ghelamco Arena

19 November 2017 15	Lokeren	0–3	Gent	Lokeren
CEST (UTC+2)				Stadium: Daknamstadion

24 November 2017 16	Gent	3–1	Excel Mouscron	Ghent
CEST (UTC+2)				Stadium: Ghelamco Arena

3 December 2017 17	Zulte Waregem	0–1	Gent	Waregem
CEST (UTC+2)				Stadium: Regenboogstadion

9 December 2017 18	Gent	2–1	Kortrijk	Ghent
CEST (UTC+2)				Stadium: Ghelamco Arena

16 December 2017 19	Standard Liège	0–0	Gent	Liège
CEST (UTC+2)				Stadium: Stade Maurice Dufrasne

21 December 2017 20	Gent	1–0	Charleroi	Ghent
CEST (UTC+2)				Stadium: Ghelamco Arena

26 December 2017 21	Anderlecht	1–0	Gent	Anderlecht
CEST (UTC+2)				Stadium: Constant Vanden Stock Stadium

21 January 2018 22	Gent	3–0	Lokeren	Ghent
CEST (UTC+2)				Stadium: Ghelamco Arena

24 January 2018 23	Antwerp	1–1	Gent	Antwerp
CEST (UTC+2)				Stadium: Bosuilstadion

28 January 2018 24	Gent	2–0	Club Brugge	Ghent
CEST (UTC+2)				Stadium: Ghelamco Arena

3 February 2018 25	Eupen	1–1	Gent	Eupen
CEST (UTC+2)				Stadium: Kehrweg Stadion

10 February 2018 25	Gent	3–0	Sint-Truiden	Ghent
CEST (UTC+2)				Stadium: Ghelamco Arena

18 February 2018 27	Gent	2–2	Mechelen	Ghent
CEST (UTC+2)				Stadium: Ghelamco Arena

24 February 2018 28	Waasland-Beveren	1–2	Gent	Beveren
CEST (UTC+2)				Stadium: Freethiel Stadion

3 March 2018 29	Gent	2–3	Oostende	Ghent
CEST (UTC+2)				Stadium: Ghelamco Arena

11 March 2018 30	Genk	1–2	Gent	Genk
CEST (UTC+2)				Stadium: Luminus Arena

==== Championship play-offs ====
Pos	Team	Pld	W	D	L	GF	GA	GD	Pts	Qualification	CLU	STA	AND	GNT	GNK	CHA
1	Club Brugge (C)	10	3	3	4	17	12	+5	46	Qualification for the Champions League group stage	—	4–4	1–2	0–1	1–0	6–0
2	Standard Liège	10	6	3	1	20	9	+11	43	Qualification for the Champions League third qualifying round	1–1	—	2–1	1–0	5–0	1–0
3	Anderlecht	10	4	0	6	12	15	−3	40	Qualification for the Europa League group stage	1–0	1–3	—	0–2	1–2	3–1
4	Gent	10	4	2	4	8	8	0	39	Qualification for the Europa League third qualifying round	1–0	1–3	1–0	—	0–0	0–1
5	Genk (O)	10	4	4	2	13	13	0	38	Qualification for the Europa League play-off final	1–1	1–0	2–1	1–1	—	4–1
6	Charleroi	10	2	2	6	9	22	−13	34		1–3	0–0	1–2	2–1	2–2	—

Source: Soccerway
Rules for classification: 1) Points; 2) Points without (possible) half points added due to rounding; 3) Position obtained during the Regular season
(C) Champions; (O) Play-off winners

==== Matches ====
1 April 2018 1	Anderlecht	0–2	Gent	Anderlecht
18:00 CEST (UTC+2)				Stadium: Constant Vanden Stock Stadium

8 April 2018 2	Gent	1–0	Club Brugge	Ghent
CEST (UTC+2)				Stadium: Ghelamco Arena

14 April 2018 3	Standard Liège	1–0	Gent	Liège
CEST (UTC+2)				Stadium: Stade Maurice Dufrasne

17 April 2018 4	Gent	0–0	Genk	Ghent
CEST (UTC+2)				Stadium: Ghelamco Arena

22 April 2018 5	Charleroi	2–1	Gent	Charleroi
CEST (UTC+2)				Stadium: Stade du Pays de Charleroi

29 April 2018 6	Gent	1–3	Standard Liège	Ghent
CEST (UTC+2)				Stadium: Ghelamco Arena

4 May 2018 7	Gent	0–1	Charleroi	Ghent
CEST (UTC+2)				Stadium: Ghelamco Arena

10 May 2018 8	Genk	1–1	Gent	Genk
CEST (UTC+2)				Stadium: Luminus Arena

13 May 2018 9	Gent	1–0	Anderlecht	Ghent
CEST (UTC+2)				Stadium: Ghelamco Arena

20 May 2018 10	Club Brugge	0–1	Gent	Bruges
CEST (UTC+2)				Stadium: Jan Breydel Stadium

=== Belgian Cup ===
20 September 2017 Sixth round	Geel	2–3	Gent	Geel
20:30 CEST (UTC+2)	Kerckhofs 48' (pen.); Nelissen 69'; Karadayi (yellow card) 68' (yellow-red card) 90+3'		Milićević 9', 59' (pen.), 81'	Stadium: De Leunen; Referee: Lawrence Visser

29 November 2017 Seventh round	Gent	2–1	Lokeren	Ghent
20:30 CET (UTC+1)	Mitrović 18'; Milićević 64'		Söder 85'	Stadium: Ghelamco Arena; Referee: Jonathan Lardot

12 December 2017 Quarter-finals	Kortrijk	4–1	Gent	Kortrijk
20:00 CET (UTC+1)	Rougeaux 7'; Ouali 25'; Ajagun 41'; Stojanović 75'		Sylla 8'	Stadium: Guldensporen Stadion; Referee: Bart Vertenten

=== UEFA Europa League ===
Third qualifying round

27 July 2017 First leg	Gent (Belgium)	1–1	(Austria) Rheindorf Altach	Ghent, Belgium
20:30 CEST (UTC+2)	K. Coulibaly 76'	Report	Ngwat-Mahop 5'; Salomon (yellow card) 18'; Kobras (yellow card) 40'; Piesinger (yellow card) 50'; Nutz (yellow card) 60'; Aigner (yellow card) 90'	Stadium: Ghelamco Arena; Attendance: 13,745; Referee: Adrien Jaccottet (Switzerland)

3 August 2017 Second leg	Rheindorf Altach (Austria)	3–1 (4–2 agg.)	(Belgium) Gent	Innsbruck, Austria
20:30 CEST (UTC+2)	Ngamaleu 11'; Aigner (yellow card) 62'; Nutz 76'; Dobras 88'	Report	K. Coulibaly (yellow card) 19'; Esiti (yellow card) 23'; S. Mitrović (yellow card) 30' (yellow-red card) 49'; Gigot (yellow card) 31'; Milićević 44' (pen.), (yellow card) 54'	Stadium: Tivoli-Neu (Note: The match was played at Tivoli-Neu in Innsbruck, instead of their regular stadium, the Stadion Schnabelholz in Altach.); Attendance: 3,852; Referee: Nicolas Rainville (France)
Note: Rheindorf Altach won 4–2 on aggregate.
