= 2017–18 Belgian Cup =

Tournament details
- Country: Belgium
- Dates: 30 July 2017 – 17 March 2018
- Teams: 312

Final positions
- Champions: Standard Liège (8th title)
- Runners-up: Genk

The 2017–18 Belgian Cup, called the Croky Cup for sponsorship reasons, was the 63rd season of Belgium's annual football cup competition. The competition began on 28 July 2017 and ended with the final on 17 March 2018. Zulte Waregem were the defending champions, but they were eliminated by Club Brugge in the Seventh Round. Standard Liège won the cup, beating Genk after extra time in the final. As the winner, Standard Liège provisionally qualified for the 2018–19 UEFA Europa League Group Stage but, as they finished 2nd in the Belgian Pro League, they participated in the 3rd qualification round of the Champions League.

== Competition format ==
The Belgian Cup consists of ten rounds, with teams entering at different points, depending on their 2017-18 League standings.

Round	Teams from last round	Teams entering this round	Leagues entering this round	Teams competing
First round	-	224	Belgian Provincial Leagues, Third Amateur Division	224
Second round	112	48	Second Amateur Division	160
Third round	80	16	First Amateur Division	96
Fourth round	48	0	None	48
Fifth round	24	8	First Division B	32
Sixth round	16	16	First Division A	32
Seventh Round	16	0	None	16
Quarter finals	8	0	None	8
Semi finals	4	0	None	4
Final	2	0	None	2

- Rounds 1–3 will be decided by a penalty shoot-out if level after ninety minutes.
- Rounds 4–7 and the quarter-finals will go to extra time if level after ninety minutes with a penalty shoot-out after that if necessary.
- The semi-finals will be decided over two legs with the winner decided on aggregate.
- The final will be a single match with extra-time and penalties if necessary.

== Round and draw dates ==
The draw for the first five rounds was made on 19 June 2017.

Round	Draw date	Match dates	Match numbers
1	19 June 2017	28–30 July 2017	1–112
2	19 June 2017	5-6 August 2017	113–192
3	19 June 2017	13 August 2017	114–240
4	19 June 2017	20 August 2017	241–264
5	19 June 2017	27 August 2017	265–280
6	28 August 2017	19-21 September 2017	281–296
7	21 September 2017	28-30 November 2017	297–304
Quarter finals	30 November 2017	12-13 December 2017; 18 January 2018	305–308
Semi finals	14 December 2017	Leg 1: 30 January 2018-1 February 2018; Leg 2: 6-8 February 2018	309–312
Final	–	17 March 2018	313

== First round ==
Results from soccerway.com

The first round began with the teams from the provincial leagues and the Third Amateur Division (tiers 5 and below).

28 July 2017
Tie	Home team	Score	Away team
1	Messancy	1–7	Bertrix
2	Gedinnois	3–0	Longlier
29 July 2017
Tie	Home team	Score	Away team
3	Elene-Grotenberge	2–1	Lochristi
4	VC Herentals	3–1	Meerle
5	Standard Elen	0–4	Leopoldsburg
6	Vorselaar	1–2	Racing Mechelen
7	Ekeren	0–2	Brasschaat
8	Balen	2–0	Sporting Wijchmaal
9	Banneux	0-0 (3–4p)	Verlaine
10	Francs Borains	1–0	Standard Flawinne
11	Tournai	2–0	Rumbeke
12	Ninove	8–0	Jette
13	Herent	0–4	Diegem
14	Esperanza Pelt	0–0 (4–2p)	Achel
15	Racing Peer	0–2	Tervant
16	Stade Bierbeke	3–3 (4–3p)	Ganshoren
17	Huvo Jeuk	2–1	Retie
18	US Givry	0–2	Longlier II
19	Lorraine Arlon	1–2	Bertrix II
20	Flavion Sport	1–1 (4–5p)	Libramont
21	Spy	2–1	Pesche
22	Couvin-Mariembourg	0–1	Nismes
30 July 2017
Tie	Home team	Score	Away team
23	Reet	1–6	Robur
24	Zepperen-Brustem	2–4	Heur Tongeren
25	Eendracht Wervik	4–0	Eernegem
26	Vlamertinge	0–3	RC Lauwe
27	Brielen	0–4	Toekomst Menen
28	Belœil	0–0 (5–4p)	Wielsbeke
29	Estaimbourg	0–3	Voorwarts Zwevezele
30	Lauwe	0–1	Havinnes
31	Poperinge	2–4	Sassport Boezinge
32	Taintignies	0–6	Racing Waregem
33	Oostnieuwkerke	2–0	Kortemark
34	Harchies-Bernissart	0–0	Oostduinkerke
35	Péruwelz	6–0	Westrozebeke
36	Drongen	1–5	Avanti
37	Jong Lede	2–1	Maldegem
38	Westkapelle	5–0	Dikkelvenne
39	Ardennen	0–2	Merelbeke
40	Wingene	5–0	Berlare
41	Oostkamp	0–0 (6–5p)	Eendracht Aalter
42	De Jeugd Lovendegem	0–4	Zelzate
43	Sint-Gillis Waas	4–1	Sint-Kruis-Winkel
44	Varsenare	0–2	Blankenberge
45	Ternesse	3–1	Eendracht Buggenhout
46	Bonheiden	1–2	FC Lebbeke
47	Gierle	0–5	Houtvenne
48	Putte	1–4	Svelta Melsele
49	Mariekerke	1–1 (4–5p)	Eendracht Zele
50	Kruibeke	0–0 (3–2p)	Lille
51	Berlaar-Heikant	3–4	Walem
52	Sint-Job	4–2	Oppuurs
53	Mariaburg	0–2	Hamme-Zogge
54	SC Aarschot	2–0	Wolvertem Merchtem

30 July 2017
Tie	Home team	Score	Away team
55	Betekom	2–2 (5–4p)	Racing Jet Wavre
56	Union Lasne-Ohain	2–2 (1–4p)	Hoeilaart
57	Waterloo	1–1 (6–5p)	KDN United
58	Sterrebeek	2–1	Strombeek
59	Tollembeek	0–0 (5–4p)	Kampenhout
60	Appelterre-Eichem	0–1	Eppegem
61	Huizingen	5–2	Léopold
62	K.V. Woluwe-Zaventem	5–1	Eendracht Mazanzele
63	Voorde	1–2	Sporting Bruxelles
64	Braine	4–0	Wemmel
65	Liedekerke	1–0	Ternat
66	Sint-Dymphna	1–4	Eendracht Termien
67	Diest	3–1	Alken
68	Helson Helchteren	2–0	Wellen
69	Zutendaal	1–3	HIH Hoepertingen
70	Flandria Paal	1–2	KMR Biesen
71	Wezel	2–1	Herk
72	Sporting Budingen	1–2	Grimbie
73	Vlijtingen	5–0	Beringen
74	Ster-Francorchamps	1–0	Stockay-Warfusée
75	Huy	4–0	Etoile Vervietoise
76	Bütgenbach	0–5	Tilleur
77	Namur	2–1	Pontisse Cité
78	Richelle United	4–0	Dalhem
79	Herstal	6–0	Fernelmont-Hemptinne
80	Loyers II	0–4	Aywaille
81	Weywertz	1–1 (5–4p)	Cointe-Liège
82	Ougrée	0–4	URSL Visé
83	Jamboise	3–2	Andennais
84	Union La Calamine	0–3	UCE Liège
85	Stade Disonais	2–0	Verviers
86	Queue-du-Bois	1–3	Assesse
87	Malmundaria	1–1 (4–2p)	Amay
88	Tilffois	0–2	Loyers
89	Onhaye	5–2	Habay-la-Vieille
90	Mormont	4–0	Melreux
91	Poupehan	0–2	Habay-la-Neuve
92	La Roche	3–1	Lierneux
93	Champlon	1–1 (3–5p)	Marloie Sport
94	Nassagne	1–1 (4–2p)	Rochefort
95	Wellin	1–0	Gouvy
96	Florenville	0–3	ES de la Molignée
97	Pâturages	1–5	Albert Quévy-Mons
98	Villers-La-Ville	1–1 (4–3p)	Stade Brainois
99	Mont-Saint-Guibert	2–3	Entité Manageoise
100	Binch	0–1	PAC Buzet
101	Malonne	1–8	Aische
102	RAS Monceau	0–2	La Louvière Centre
103	Rhisnes	2–4	Solre-sur-Sambre
104	Montignies II	0–5	Jeunesse Tamines
105	Anderlues	1–0	SG-Tertre-Hautrage
106	Chastre	2–1	RLC Givry
107	Rapid Symphorinois	7–1	Le Roeulx
108	Flénu	1–4	Grand-Leez
109	Bambrugge	1–1 (4–2p)	RFC Wetteren
110	Groen Rood Katelijne	2–1	Nijlen
111	Grimbergen	3–2	Nederhasselt
112	Melo Zonhoven	0–2	Bilzerse Waltwilder

== Second round ==
Fixtures from soccerway.com

In the second round the teams that won their ties in round one are joined by the teams from the Second Amateur Division.

5 August 2017
Tie	Home team	Score	Away team
113	Hamoir	1–0	Merelbeke
114	Helson Helchteren	0–2	La Louvière Centre
115	Solre-sur-Sambre	0–0 (4–2p)	Walem
116	Turnhout	3–0	Belœil
117	Marloie Sport	0–3	Hoogstraten
118	RWDM	3–1	Leopoldsburg
119	Esperanza Pelt	0–0 (5–4p)	Thes Sport
120	Spy	0–3	Cappellen
121	Tempo Overijse	2–1	Namur
122	Racing Mechelen	1–2	Olsa Brakel
6 August 2017
Tie	Home team	Score	Away team
123	Waterloo	1–4	Tienen-Hageland
124	Hoeilaart	0–1	Sprimont-Comblain
125	RC Lauwe	1–4	Liège
126	Acren-Lessines	2–1	Woluwe-Zaventem
127	Duffel	4–1	Stade Brainois
128	RES Durbuy	1–0	Balen
129	Avanti	0–2	Sporting Hasselt
130	Ternesse	1–3	Spouwen-Mopertingen
131	Zwarte Leeuw	4–0	Racing Waregem
132	Malmundaria	0–3	Olympic Charleroi
133	URSL Visé	2–4	Sint-Eloois-Winkel
134	Olympia Wijgmaal	3–1	Kruibeke
135	Habay-la-Neuve	0–6	Westhoek
136	Walhain	4–0	Westkapelle
137	White Star Bruxelles	1–1 (7-6p)	La Roche
138	Aywaille	2–1	Izegem
139	Eendracht Zele	1–4	Bocholt
140	Gullegem	2–0	Wellin
141	Stade Bierbeek	2–1	Solières Sport
142	Vlijtingen	3–1	Sint-Niklaas
143	Liedekerke	1–7	Gent-Zeehaven
144	La Louvière	0–0 (5–6p)	Londerzeel
145	La Calamine	1–1 (4–5p)	Grimbergen
146	Ciney	2–2 (2–4p)	Ninove
147	Chastre	1–3	Harelbeke
148	Waremme	3–0	Oostnieuwkerke
149	Nassogne	0–2	Sparta Petegem
150	Libramont	0–5	Rupel Boom
151	Pepingen	2–0	Sterrebeek

6 August 2017
Tie	Home team	Score	Away team
152	Meux	0–1	Bilzerse Waltwilder
153	Péruwelz	2–2 (5–4p)	Rebecq
154	Robur	2–2 (4–3p)	Bornem
155	Hades	0–1	Bambrugge
156	Torhout	9–0	Assesse
157	Brasschaat	1–4	City Pirates Antwerpen
158	Toekomst Menen	1–1 (10–9p)	Vosselaar
159	Blankenberge	1–1 (4–5p)	Temse
160	Sint-Lenaarts	1–0	Sassport Boezinge
161	Sint-Gillis Waas	0–3	Ronse
162	Jong Lede	4–1	Wezel
163	Tilleur	5–1	SC Aarschot
164	Albert Quévy-Mons	5–1	Hamme-Zogge
165	Francs Borains	5–1	Herstal
166	Havinnes	1–5	Rapid Symphorinois
167	Sporting Bruxelles	3–2	Villers-La-Ville
168	Grand-Leez	1–2	Eppegem
169	Houtvenne	4–0	Ster-Francorchamps
170	Huy	2–0	UCE Liège
171	Oostduinkerke	1–2	PAC Buzet
172	Tollembeek	0–4	ES de la Molignée
173	Grimbie	0–2	Mormont
174	Entité Manageoise	2–2 (3–5p)	Huvo Jeuk
175	Elene-Grotenberge	0–3	Diest
176	Sint-Job	2–3	KMR Biesen
177	Tervant	2–5	US Givry
178	Voorwaarts Zwevezele	2–0	HIH Hoepertingen
179	VC Herentals	7–0	Gedinnois
180	Loyers	3-3 (8–9p)	Onhaye
181	Betekom	1–0	Verlaine
182	Bertrix	0–1	Eendracht Wervik
183	Aische	0–1	Anderlues
184	Richelle United	2–0	Nismes
185	Tournai	1–3	Eendracht Termien
186	Huizingen	0–5	FC Lebbeke
187	Jeunesse Tamines	2–2 (4–2p)	Diegem Sport
188	Weywertz	7–0	Jamboise
189	Svelta Melsele	1–1 (4–5p)	Zelzate
190	Wingene	2–1	Heur Tongeren
191	Oostkamp	1–0	Stade Disonais
192	Bertrix II	0–6	Groen Rood Katelijne

== Third round ==
Fixtures from soccerway.com

In round three, teams from the First Amateur Division join the winners from round two.

13 August 2017
Tie	Home team	Score	Away team
193	Eendracht Aalst	2–0	Torhout
194	Tilleur	2–0	Deinze
195	Sint-Eloois-Winkel	1–1 (2–4p)	Seraing
196	Heist	4–2	Zelzate
197	Solre-sur-Sambre	0–1	Geel
198	Dessel Sport	2–2 (6–5p)	Gent-Zeehaven
199	Dender	4–0	Biesen
200	Givry	1–6	K. Berchem Sport
201	Hamme	2–1	Zwevezele
202	Spouwen-Mopertingen	2–4	Knokke
203	Oosterzonen Oosterwijk	1–0	HO Bierbeek
204	Bocholt	1–1 (4–3p)	Châtelet-Farciennes
205	Patro Maasmechelen	0–3	La Louvière Centre
206	Lommel United	4–0	Gullegem
207	Jong Lede	1–3	Oudenaarde
208	Rupel Boom	1–1 (4–3p)	Virton
209	Durbuy	2–1	Hamoir
210	Wingene	2–0	Ronse
211	Liège	2–1	Zwarte Leeuw
212	RWDM	1–0	Londerzeel
213	Eppegem	0–1	Temse
214	Sint-Lenaarts	1–0	VC Herentals
215	Wijgmaal	4–2	Cappellen
216	Onhaye	3–1	Betekom

13 August 2017
Tie	Home team	Score	Away team
217	Acren-Lessines	2–1	Westhoek
218	Olsa Brakel	1–2	City Pirates Antwerpen
219	Houtvenne	1–2	Menen
220	Harelbeke	0–0 (5–3p)	Olympic Charleroi
221	Duffel	3–2	Tamines
222	Mormont	2–1	Tienen-Hageland
223	Esperanza Pelt	6–2	Pont-a-Celles Buzet
224	Robur	2–1	GR Katelijne
225	Aywaille	1–1 (5–3p)	Huy
226	Sprimont-Comblain	2–3	Sparta Petegem
227	Waremme	2–2 (6–5p)	Walhain
228	Turnhout	2–0	Anderlues
229	Oostkamp	1–2	Lebbeke
230	Bilzen Waltwilder	2–0	Symphorinois
231	Tempo Overijse	1–0	Vlijtingen
232	Peruwelz	0–0 (4–3p)	Termien
233	White Star Bruxelles	0–8	Sporting Bruxelles
234	Hoogstraten	1–0	Huvo Jeuk
235	Diest	0–0 (4–5p)	Pepingen-Halle
236	Wervik	1–0	Ninove
237	Quevy-Mons	2–1	Molignée
238	Richelle	2–2 (5–4p)	Bambrugge
239	Hasselt	3–1	Francs Borains
240	Weywertz	1–3	Grimbergen

== Fourth round ==
20 August 2017
Tie	Home team	Score	Away team
241	Lommel United	7–0	Mormont
242	Heist	2–1 (a.e.t.)	City Pirates Antwerpen
243	Turnhout	2–2 (4–3p)	Harelbeke
244	Rupel Boom	3–1	Onhaye
245	Temse	2–0	Lebbeke
246	Acren-Lessines	3–5	Geel
247	Sint-Lenaarts	1–0	Grimbergen
248	Eendracht Aalst	3–0	Pepingen-Halle
249	RWDM	3–0	Hamme
250	Dessel Sport	5–0	Hasselt
251	Liège	2–0	Wingene
252	Tilleur	2–1 (a.e.t.)	Hoogstraten

20 August 2017
Tie	Home team	Score	Away team
253	La Louvière Centre	3–0	Quevy-Mons
254	Wijgmaal	3–0	Esperanza Pelt
255	Bocholt	2–1	Seraing
256	Oudenaarde	2–0	Dender
257	Bilzen Waltwilder	3–1	Robur
258	Tempo Overijse	3–3 (3–2p)	Sparta Petegem
259	Duffel	4–2	Waremme
260	Durbuy	4–0	K. Berchem Sport
261	Peruwelz	0–1	Menen
262	Aywaille	0–4	Knokke
263	Sporting Bruxelles	0–4	Oosterzonen Oosterwijk
264	Richelle	1–2	Wervik

== Fifth round ==
27 August 2017
Tie	Home team	Score	Away team
265	Oud-Heverlee Leuven	8–0	Turnhout
266	Oosterzonen Oosterwijk	2–3	Beerschot Wilrijk
267	Tilleur	1–4	Union Saint-Gilloise
268	Menen	0–4	Westerlo
269	Oudenaarde	3–3 (3–4p)	Tubize
270	Bilzen Waltwilder	1–3	Roeselare
271	Sint-Lenaarts	0–2	Lierse
272	Cercle Brugge	3–1 (a.e.t.)	Temse

27 August 2017
Tie	Home team	Score	Away team
273	Lommel United	2–0	Dessel Sport
274	Eendracht Aalst	1–2	Liège
275	RWDM	1–1 (4–5p)	La Louvière Centre
276	Knokke	2–5	Heist
277	Wervik	2–3	Rupel Boom
278	Wijgmaal	0–1	Bocholt
279	Tempo Overijse	2–3	Durbuy
280	Geel	3–0	Duffel

== Sixth Round ==
The sixth round saw the entry of the Belgian First Division A teams. The matches were played on 19, 20 and 21 September 2017.

19 September 2017	Kortrijk	5–3	Durbuy (4)	Kortrijk
20:00	Rougeaux 6'; Van Eenoo 22'; Perbet 39'; Ouali 60'; Ajagun 78'	Report	Manfredi 29'; Biatour 45'; Jo. Jadot 81'	Stadium: Guldensporen Stadion

19 September 2017	Antwerp	2–0	Lierse (2)	Antwerp
20:30	Matheus 73'; Arslanagić 85'	Report		Stadium: Bosuilstadion; Referee: Luc Wouters

19 September 2017	Sint-Truiden	4–2 (a.e.t.)	Oud-Heverlee Leuven (2)	Sint-Truiden
20:30	Botaka 4'; Goutas 104'; Vetokele 107', 112'	Report	Persoons 56'; Schuermans (yellow card) 59' (yellow-red card) 65'; Boulenger (yellow card) 34' (yellow-red card) 87'; Storm 105+2'	Stadium: Stayen; Referee: Erik Lambrechts

20 September 2017	KV Mechelen	3–0	Bocholt (4)	Mechelen
20:00	Vitas 20'; Bandé 37'; Matthys 70'	Report		Stadium: AFAS-stadion Achter de Kazerne; Referee: Bart Vertenten

20 September 2017	RFC Liège (4)	2–3	Zulte Waregem	Seraing
20:00	Lamort 28'; Dethier 66'; Corstjens (red card) 70'	Report	Šaponjić 23'; De Pauw 50' (pen.); Hämäläinen 72' (pen.)	Stadium: Stade du Pairay; Referee: Alexandre Boucaut

20 September 2017	Oostende	3–1	Union SG (2)	Ostend
20:00	Gano 30'; Musona 86', 90+4'	Report	Bertjens 89'	Stadium: Versluys Arena; Referee: Kevin van Damme

20 September 2017	Lommel (3)	1–2	Waasland-Beveren	Lommel
20:00	Vermijl 3'	Report	Dierckx 5'; Camacho 8'; Kiese Thelin (red card) 41'	Stadium: Soevereinstadion; Referee: Wim Smet

20 September 2017	Cercle Brugge (2)	0–1	Genk	Bruges
20:00		Report	Pozuelo 15'	Stadium: Jan Breydel Stadium; Referee: Christof Dierick

20 September 2017	Excel Mouscron	3–1	Tubize (2)	Mouscron
20:00	Awoniyi 28'; Rotariu 34', 70'	Report	Vidémont 56'	Stadium: Stade Le Canonnier; Referee: Jan Boterberg

20 September 2017	Lokeren	2–0	Beerschot Wilrijk (2)	Lokeren
20:30	De Ridder 14', 62'	Report		Stadium: Daknamstadion; Referee: Bram Van Driessche

20 September 2017	Roeselare (2)	1–5	Club Brugge	Roeselare
20:30	Brouwers 44'	Report	Dennis 7', 32'; Vormer 17'; Wesley 39'; Vossen 83'	Stadium: Schiervelde Stadion; Referee: Jonathan Lardot

20 September 2017	Geel (3)	2–3	Gent	Geel
20:30	Kerckhofs 48' (pen.); Nelissen 69'; Karadayi (yellow card) 68' (yellow-red card) 90+3'	Report	Milićević 9', 59' (pen.), 81'	Stadium: De Leunen; Referee: Lawrence Visser

20 September 2017	Eupen	3–2	Rupel Boom (4)	Eupen
20:30	Verdier 37'; Schouterden 43'; Leye 51'	Report	Van Hoof 4'; Put 28'	Stadium: Kehrwegstadion; Referee: Ken Vermeiren

20 September 2017	Westerlo (2)	0–1	Anderlecht	Westerlo
20:45		Report	Onyekuru 66'	Stadium: Het Kuipje; Referee: Erik Lambrechts

20 September 2017	Standard Liège	4–0	Heist (3)	Liège
20:45	Carlinhos 28'; Marin 31'; Sá 64'; Čop 71'; M'Poku (yellow card) 50' (yellow-red card) 75'	Report		Stadium: Stade Maurice Dufrasne; Referee: Nathan Verboomen

21 September 2017	Charleroi	4–0	La Louvière Centre (4)	Charleroi
20:45	Benavente 4', 76'; Fall 40'; Bedia 65'	Report		Stadium: Stade du Pays de Charleroi; Referee: Wesley Alen

== Seventh Round ==
The draw for the seventh round was made immediately after the last game of the sixth round, between Charleroi and La Louvière Centre, was finished. As all 16 teams from the Belgian First Division A won their match in the Sixth Round, no teams from a lower division made it into this round.

The matches were played on 28, 29, and 30 November 2017.

28 November 2017	Oostende	2–0	Sint-Truiden	Ostend
20:00	Gano 2'; Zivkovic 11'	Report		Stadium: Versluys Arena; Referee: Alexandre Boucaut

28 November 2017	Excel Mouscron	0–1	Charleroi	Mouscron
20:00		Report	Fall 53'	Stadium: Stade Le Canonnier; Referee: Wim Smet

29 November 2017	Kortrijk	4–2	Antwerp	Kortrijk
20:00	Stojanović 37'; Perbet 58' (pen.), 62'; Ouali 67'	Report	Ghandri 71'; Owusu 84'	Stadium: Guldensporen Stadion; Referee: Jan Boterberg

29 November 2017	Mechelen	1–1 (a.e.t.) (4–5 p)	Genk	Mechelen
20:00	Pedersen 3'; El Messaoudi (red card) 6'	Report	Ingvartsen 7' (pen.); Malinovskyi (red card) 36'	Stadium: AFAS-stadion Achter de Kazerne; Referee: Christof Dierick
	Penalties
	De Witte (penalty scored); Rits (penalty scored); Kawaya (penalty missed); Cocalić (penalty scored); Bandé (penalty scored)		(penalty scored) Ingvartsen; (penalty scored) Pozuelo; (penalty scored) Schrijvers; (penalty scored) Aidoo; (penalty scored) Zhegrova

29 November 2017	Gent	2–1	Lokeren	Ghent
20:30	Mitrović 18'; Milićević 64'	Report	Söder 85'	Stadium: Ghelamco Arena; Referee: Jonathan Lardot

29 November 2017	Waasland-Beveren	2–0	Eupen	Beveren
20:30	Morioka 21'; Ampomah 64'; Buatu Mananga (red card) 85'	Report		Stadium: Freethiel Stadion; Referee: Wesley Alen

29 November 2017	Anderlecht	0–1	Standard Liège	Brussels
20:45		Report	Carlinhos 18'	Stadium: Constant Vanden Stock Stadium; Referee: Luc Wouters

30 November 2017	Zulte Waregem	2–3 (a.e.t.)	Club Brugge	Waregem
20:45	De fauw 67'; Leya Iseka 72'	Report	Vossen 4'; Dennis 83', 106'	Stadium: Regenboogstadion; Referee: Sébastien Delferière

== Quarter-finals ==
The draw for the quarter-finals was made on 30 November 2017, immediately after completion of the final match of the Seventh Round. The matches will be played on 12 and 13 December 2017.

12 December 2017	Kortrijk	4–1	Gent	Kortrijk
20:00	Rougeaux 7'; Ouali 25'; Ajagun 41'; Stojanović 75'	Report	Sylla 8'	Stadium: Guldensporen Stadion; Referee: Bart Vertenten

12 December 2017	Oostende	2–3	Standard Liège	Ostend
20:45	Zivkovic 18'; Gano 90+4'	Report	Sá 35'; Marin 48'; Emond 84'	Stadium: Versluys Arena; Referee: Wim Smet

13 December 2017	Genk	3–3 (a.e.t.) (4–2 p)	Waasland-Beveren	Genk
20:00	Malinovskyi 10', 90+2'; Trossard 13'	Report	Nastić 22' (o.g.); Morioka 45'; Camacho (yellow card) 59' (yellow-red card) 90+1'; Myny 90+6'	Stadium: Luminus Arena; Referee: Nathan Verboomen
	Penalties
	Ingvartsen (penalty scored); Pozuelo (penalty scored); Schrijvers (penalty scored); Malinovskyi (penalty scored)		(penalty missed) Myny; (penalty scored) Ampomah; (penalty scored) Demir; (penalty missed) Angban

16 January 2018	Club Brugge	5–1	Charleroi	Bruges
20:45	Vanaken 12', 64'; Mechele 23', 34'; Wesley 36'	Report	N'Ganga 25'	Stadium: Jan Breydel Stadium; Attendance: 15,000; Referee: Bart Vertenten

== Semi-finals ==
The draw for the semi-finals was supposed to occur right after conclusion of the quarter-final match between Club Brugge and Charleroi, but was postponed to the next day after the match was cancelled. The semi-final dates were also shifted, as the postponed match will take place on 16 January 2018, shifting the semi-final matches back by two weeks, with the first legs now played on 30, 31 January 2018 or 1 February 2018 and the second legs in the period from 6 to 8 February 2017.

=== First Legs ===
30 January 2018	Kortrijk	3–2	Genk	Kortrijk
20:45	Ajagun 24'; Azouni 36'; Rougeaux 88'	Report	Ingvartsen 18'; Buffel 45+2'	Stadium: Guldensporen Stadion; Referee: Wim Smet

31 January 2018	Standard Liège	4–1	Club Brugge	Liège
20:45	Emond 20', 26', 56'; Edmilson 58'	Report	Mitrović 84'	Stadium: Stade Maurice Dufrasne; Referee: Nicolas Laforge

=== Second Legs ===
6 February 2018	Genk	1–0 (3a−3 agg.)	Kortrijk	Genk
20:45	Seck 16'	Report		Stadium: Luminus Arena; Referee: Bram Van Driessche

8 February 2018	Club Brugge	3–2 (4−6 agg.)	Standard Liège	Bruges
20:45	Vanaken 42'; Diaby 63'; Clasie 75'	Report	Sá 5'; Emond 71'	Stadium: Jan Breydel Stadium

== Final ==
The final took place on 17 March 2018 at the King Baudouin Stadium in Brussels and was won by Standard Liège.

17 March 2018
20:45

Genk	0–1 (a.e.t.)	Standard Liège
	report	Emond 92'

King Baudouin Stadium, Brussels
Attendance: 44,807
Referee: Jonathan Lardot
