= 2015 Belgian Super Cup =

Gent	Club Brugge
League winners	Cup winners
1	0
- Date: 16 July 2015
- Venue: Ghelamco Arena, Ghent
- Referee: Erik Lambrechts
- Attendance: 15,174

The 2015 Belgian Super Cup was a football match played on 16 July 2015, between Gent, the winners of the 2014–15 Belgian Pro League and 2014–15 Belgian Cup winners Club Brugge. Gent won 1–0, winning the Super Cup for the first time.

== Match ==
=== Details ===
16 July 2015
20:30 CEST

Gent	1–0	Club Brugge
Depoitre 87'	Report

Ghelamco Arena, Ghent
Attendance: 15,174
Referee: Erik Lambrechts

Gent	Club Brugge

GK	1	(Belgium) Matz Sels
DF	4	(Brazil) Rafinha	(yellow card) 75'
DF	23	(Denmark) Lasse Nielsen
DF	21	(Ghana) Nana Akwasi Asare		(substituted off) 78'
MF	32	(Belgium) Thomas Foket
MF	10	(Brazil) Renato Neto	(yellow card) 45'
MF	14	(Belgium) Sven Kums (c)
MF	77	(Switzerland) Danijel Milićević
MF	15	(Israel) Kenny Saief
FW	26	(Belgium) Benito Raman		(substituted off) 71'
FW	9	(Belgium) Laurent Depoitre	(yellow card) 90'
Substitutes:
GK	25	(Belgium) Brian Vandenbussche
DF	3	(Serbia) Uros Vitas
MF	19	(Belgium) Brecht Dejaegere		(substituted on) 71'
MF	17	(Belgium) Hannes Van der Bruggen
FW	27	(Nigeria) Moses Simon		(substituted on) 78'
FW	22	(Cameroon) Serge Tabekou
FW	70	(Ivory Coast) Yaya Soumahoro
Manager:
(Belgium) Hein Vanhaezebrouck

GK	16	(Belgium) Sébastien Bruzzese
DF	2	(Belgium) Davy De fauw
DF	44	(Belgium) Brandon Mechele
DF	24	(Netherlands) Stefano Denswil	(yellow card) 75'
DF	28	(Belgium) Laurens De Bock
MF	3	(Belgium) Timmy Simons (c)
MF	20	(Belgium) Hans Vanaken
MF	25	(Netherlands) Ruud Vormer
FW	7	(Belgium) Víctor Vázquez		(substituted off) 81'
FW	9	(Belgium) Tom De Sutter		(substituted off) 64'
FW	10	(Mali) Abdoulay Diaby
Substitutes:
GK	41	(Belgium) Jens Teunckens
DF	21	(Belgium) Dion Cools
MF	57	(Belgium) Yannick Reuten
FW	22	(Colombia) José Izquierdo		(substituted on) 64'
FW	58	(Belgium) Obbi Oulare	(yellow card) 90'	(substituted on) 81'
FW	14	(Croatia) Fran Brodić
FW	55	(Belgium) Tuur Dierckx
Manager:
(Belgium) Michel Preud'homme

== See also ==
- 2015–16 Belgian Pro League
- 2015–16 Belgian Cup
