= Thomas Foket =

Belgian footballer

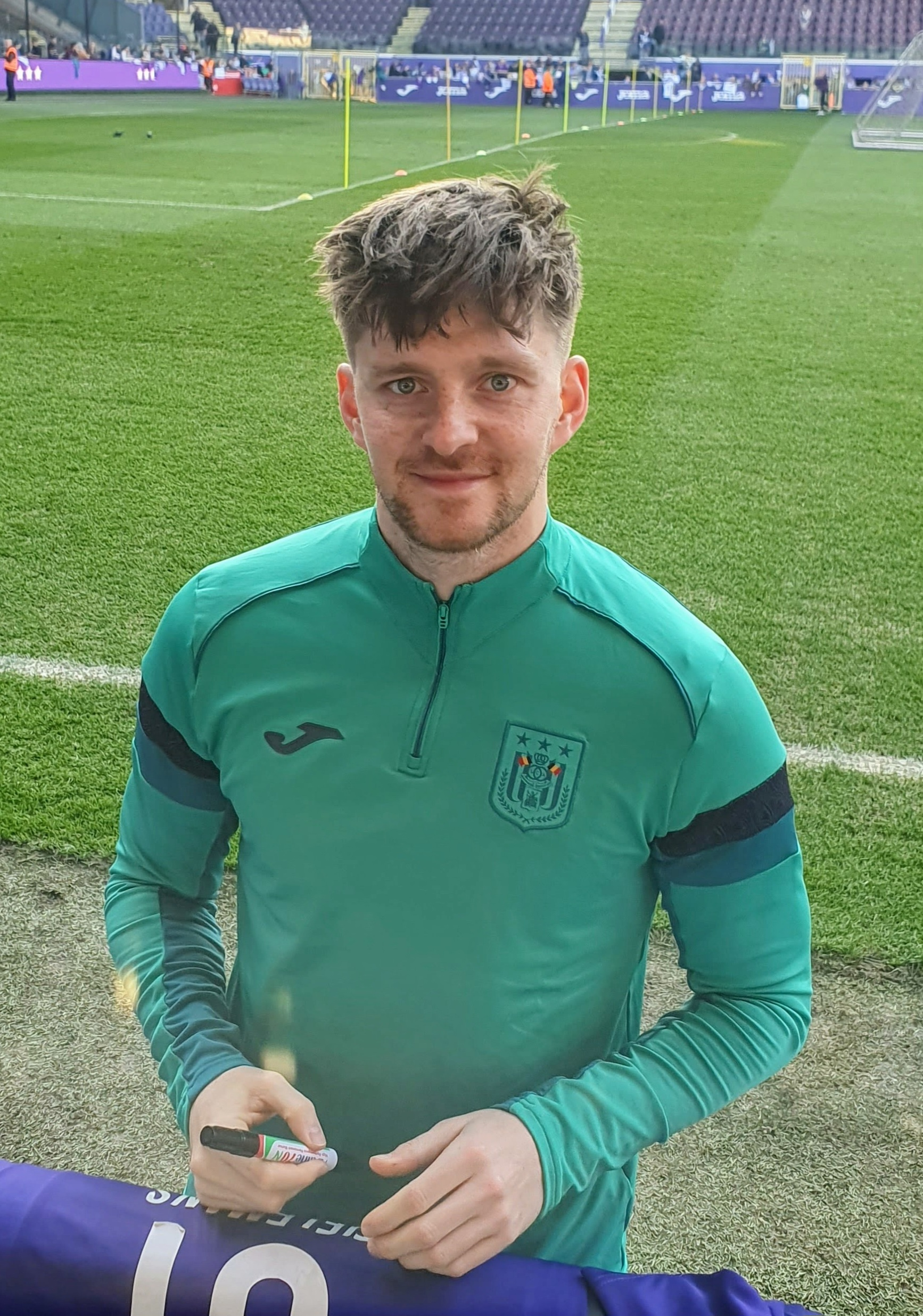
- Foket with Anderlecht in 2025

Personal information
- Date of birth: 25 September 1994 (age 32)
- Place of birth: Brussels, Belgium
- Height: 1.77 m (5 ft 10 in)
- Positions: Right-back; right midfielder

Team information
- Current team: RSCA Futures
- Number: 25

Senior career*
Years	Team	Apps	(Gls)
2012–2018	Gent	147	(2)
2013–2014	→ Oostende (loan)	26	(0)
2018–2024	Reims	176	(1)
2024–2026	Anderlecht	12	(0)
2025–	RSCA Futures	6	(0)

International career^{‡}
2012	Belgium U18	2	(1)
2012–2013	Belgium U19	12	(2)
2014–2016	Belgium U21	11	(0)
2016–2022	Belgium	10	(1)
- * Club domestic league appearances and goals as of 21 August 2026 ‡ National team caps and goals as of 14 June 2022

Thomas Foket (born 25 September 1994) is a Belgian professional footballer who plays as a right-back for Challenger Pro League side RSCA Futures and the Belgium national team.

== Club career ==
=== Dilbeek Sport ===
At age 16, Foket was in the first team of Fourth Division side Dilbeek Sport. At the end of the 2011–12 season, he was solicited by different Belgian Pro League teams, of which were AA Gent, Club Brugge and R.S.C. Anderlecht. He chose to play in Gent, as it was the best way to combine finishing his studies and football training.

=== Gent ===
In March 2012, Foket signed a two-year contract with Gent. He made his debut for Gent in the second qualifying round of the Europa League, against FC Differdange 03, replacing Mohamed Messoudi in the 79th minute.

In July 2012, Gent extended the contract of Foket until 2016. In October 2014, Foket extended his contract until 2018.

Upon his return from loan at Oostende, Foket was transformed to a right midfielder.

=== Oostende ===
In the season 2013–14, Foket was on loan at K.V. Oostende, which had just been promoted to the Pro League

=== Reims ===
In August 2018, Foket joined Ligue 1 side Stade de Reims on a five-year contract. The transfer fee was reported as €3.5 million.

=== Anderlecht ===
On 3 August 2024, Foket signed a three-season contract with Anderlecht.

== International career ==
In November 2016 Foket received his first call-up to the senior Belgium squad for matches against Netherlands and Estonia. Foket made his formal debut for Belgium on 10 November 2016 as a half-time substitute in a friendly with the Netherlands that finished 1–1.

== Career statistics ==
As of match played 1 May 2025

Appearances and goals by club, season and competition
Club	Season	League			National cup (Note: Includes Belgian Cup, Coupe de France)		League Cup		Europe		Other		Total	
Club	Season	Division	Apps	Goals	Apps	Goals	Apps	Goals	Apps	Goals	Apps	Goals	Apps	Goals
Gent	2012–13	Belgian Pro League	6	0	0	0	—		1 (Note: Appearances in UEFA Europa League)	0	—		7	0
Gent	2014–15	Belgian Pro League	38	2	5	0	—		0	0	—		43	2
Gent	2015–16	Belgian Pro League	39	0	5	0	—		7 (Note: Appearances in UEFA Champions League)	1	1 (Note: Appearance in Belgian Super Cup)	0	52	1
Gent	2016–17	Belgian Pro League	35	0	3	0	—		13	0	—		51	0
Gent	2017–18	Belgian Pro League	24	0	1	0	—		—		—		25	0
Gent	2018–19	Belgian Pro League	5	0	0	0	—		4	0	—		9	0
Gent	Total		147	2	14	0	—		25	1	1	0	187	3
Oostende (loan)	2013–14	Belgian Pro League	26	0	3	1	—		—		—		29	1
Reims	2018–19	Ligue 1	32	0	2	0	0	0	—		—		34	0
Reims	2019–20	Ligue 1	27	0	1	0	4	0	—		—		32	0
Reims	2020–21	Ligue 1	37	0	1	0	—		2	0	—		40	0
Reims	2021–22	Ligue 1	29	1	0	0	—		—		—		29	1
Reims	2022–23	Ligue 1	24	0	2	0	—		—		—		26	0
Reims	2023–24	Ligue 1	27	0	1	0	—		—		—		28	0
Reims	Total		176	0	7	0	4	0	2	0	—		189	0
Anderlecht	2024–25	Belgian Pro League	12	0	3	0	—		8	0	—		23	0
Career total			362	3	27	1	4	0	35	0	1	0	424	5

== Honours ==
Gent

- Belgian Pro League: 2014–15
- Belgian Super Cup: 2015
