= Brecht Dejaegere =

Belgian footballer (born 1991)

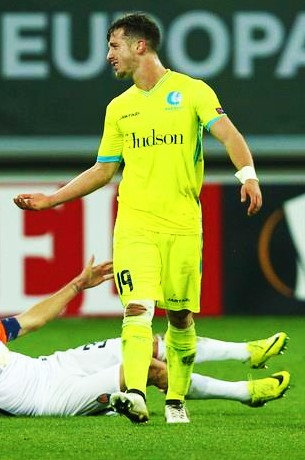
- Dejaegere with Gent in 2016

Personal information
- Full name: Brecht Emiel Dejaegere
- Date of birth: 29 May 1991 (age 35)
- Place of birth: Handzame, Belgium
- Height: 1.73 m (5 ft 8 in)
- Position: Midfielder

Team information
- Current team: Kortrijk
- Number: 19

Youth career
- 2007–2010: Kortrijk

Senior career*
Years	Team	Apps	(Gls)
2010–2013	Kortrijk	46	(4)
2013–2021	Gent	182	(18)
2020–2021	→ Toulouse (loan)	32	(3)
2021–2023	Toulouse	57	(6)
2023–2024	Charlotte FC	29	(2)
2024–	Kortrijk	53	(3)
- * Club domestic league appearances and goals as of 19 April 2026

Brecht Emiel Dejaegere (born 29 May 1991) is a Belgian professional footballer who plays as a midfielder for Kortrijk.

== Club career ==
Starting his career with Kortrijk, Dejaegere moved to Gent in 2013, helping them to the 2014-15 Belgian Pro League title, and a subsequent last-16 run in the UEFA Champions League.

A move to Toulouse FC saw Dejaegere quickly appointed captain, helping them to the Ligue 2 title in 2022, claiming a landmark French Cup success the following year.

After playing in the MLS in 2024 for Charlotte FC, Dejaegere returned to Kortrijk on a two-year contract in August 2024.

== Honours ==
Gent

- Belgian Pro League: 2014–15
- Belgian Super Cup: 2015

Toulouse

- Ligue 2: 2021–22
- Coupe de France: 2022–23

== Career statistics ==
As of match played 16 December 2025

Appearances and goals by club, season and competition
Club	Season	League			National cup (Note: Includes Belgian Cup, Coupe de France and U.S. Open Cup)		Continental		Other		Total	
Club	Season	Division	Apps	Goals	Apps	Goals	Apps	Goals	Apps	Goals	Apps	Goals
Kortrijk	2010–11	Belgian Pro League	2	0	0	0	—		—		2	0
Kortrijk	2011–12	Belgian Pro League	19	1	1	0	—		—		20	1
Kortrijk	2012–13	Belgian Pro League	24	3	2	1	—		—		26	4
Kortrijk	2013–14	Belgian Pro League	2	0	0	0	—		—		2	0
Kortrijk	Total		47	4	3	1	—		—		50	5
Gent	2013–14	Belgian Pro League	26	1	4	0	—		—		30	1
Gent	2014–15	Belgian Pro League	36	5	4	1	—		—		40	6
Gent	2015–16	Belgian Pro League	25	7	3	2	6 (Note: Appearance(s) in UEFA Champions League)	0	1 (Note: Appearance(s) in Belgian Super Cup)	0	35	9
Gent	2016–17	Belgian Pro League	25	1	1	0	7 (Note: Appearance(s) in UEFA Europa League)	0	—		33	1
Gent	2017–18	Belgian Pro League	35	3	2	0	2	0	—		39	3
Gent	2018–19	Belgian Pro League	34	2	4	0	3	0	—		41	2
Gent	2019–20	Belgian Pro League	15	0	1	0	8	1	—		24	1
Gent	2020–21	Belgian Pro League	1	0	0	0	0	0	—		1	0
Gent	Total		197	19	19	3	26	1	1	0	243	23
Toulouse (loan)	2020–21	Ligue 2	32	3	0	0	—		3 (Note: Appearance(s) in Ligue 1 Promotion/Relegation play-offs)	0	35	3
Toulouse	2021–22	Ligue 2	27	2	3	0	—		—		30	2
Toulouse	2022–23	Ligue 1	30	4	5	0	—		—		35	4
Toulouse	Total		57	6	8	0	—		—		65	6
Charlotte FC	2023	MLS	9	1	0	0	2 (Note: Appearance(s) in Leagues Cup)	0	1 (Note: Appearance(s) in MLS Cup playoffs)	0	12	1
Charlotte FC	2024	MLS	20	1	0	0	1	0	0	0	21	1
Charlotte FC	Total		29	2	0	0	3	0	1	0	33	2
Kortrijk	2024–25	Belgian Pro League	25	1	2	0	—		—		27	1
Kortrijk	2025–26	Challenger Pro League	15	0	1	0	—		—		16	0
Kortrijk	Total		40	1	3	0	—		—		43	1
Career total			402	32	33	4	29	1	5	0	469	37
