= Brian Vandenbussche =

Belgian footballer (born 1981)

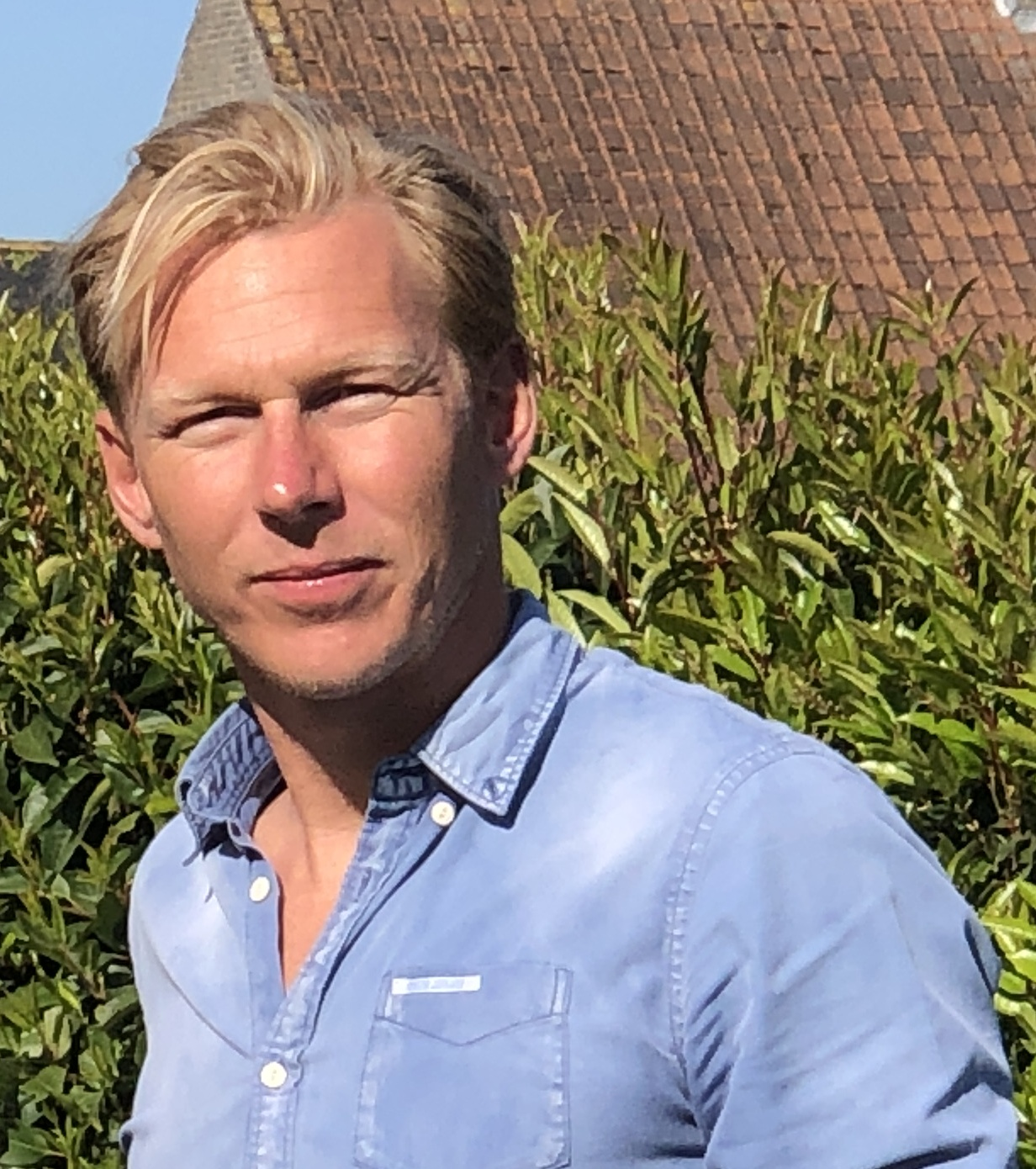
- Vandenbussche in 2021

Personal information
- Full name: Brian Vandenbussche
- Date of birth: 24 September 1981 (age 45)
- Place of birth: Blankenberge, Belgium
- Height: 1.96 m (6 ft 5 in)
- Position: Goalkeeper

Senior career*
Years	Team	Apps	(Gls)
2001–2002	Club Brugge	0	(0)
2002–2004	Sparta Rotterdam	14	(0)
2004–2014	Heerenveen	177	(0)
2014–2017	Gent	1	(0)
2017–2019	Cercle Brugge	0	(0)
2019–2021	KSV Blankenberge		

International career
2006–2007	Belgium	3	(0)
- * Club domestic league appearances and goals

Brian Vandenbussche (Dutch pronunciation: [ˈbrɑi.ɑɱ vɑndə(m)ˈbʏsə]; (Note: In isolation, Brian is pronounced [ˈbrɑi.ɑn].) born 24 September 1981) is a Belgian former professional footballer who played as a goalkeeper.

He formerly played for Sparta Rotterdam and ten seasons for Heerenveen.

== Career ==
At the end of February 2019 it was confirmed, that Vandenbussche would join KSV Blankenberge ahead of the 2019–20 season. Vandenbussche also became a youth coach and individual coach at the club.

== Honours ==
SC Heerenveen

- KNVB Cup: 2009

Gent

- Belgian Super Cup: 2015
