= Hannes Van der Bruggen =

Belgian footballer (born 1993)

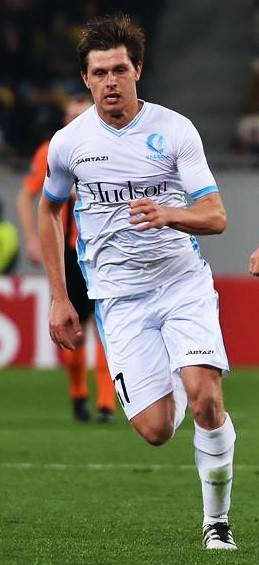

Personal information
- Date of birth: 1 April 1993 (age 33)
- Place of birth: Aalst, Belgium
- Height: 1.80 m (5 ft 11 in)
- Position: Midfielder

Team information
- Current team: Cercle Brugge
- Number: 28

Youth career
- 1999–2003: KFC Olympic Burst
- 2003–2004: FC Denderleeuw
- 2004–2010: Gent

Senior career*
Years	Team	Apps	(Gls)
2010–2017	Gent	121	(7)
2017–2021	KV Kortrijk	132	(6)
2021–	Cercle Brugge	164	(1)

International career
2008	Belgium U15	7	(1)
2008–2009	Belgium U16	9	(1)
2008–2010	Belgium U17	17	(2)
2010	Belgium U18	1	(0)
2010–2012	Belgium U19	21	(4)
2012–2013	Belgium U21	6	(1)
- * Club domestic league appearances and goals as of 11 May 2026

Hannes Van der Bruggen (born 1 April 1993) is a Belgian professional footballer who plays as a midfielder for Cercle Brugge in the Belgian Pro League.

== Club career ==
=== Gent ===
Van der Bruggen began his professional footballing career at Gent in 2010, after spending six years in the club's academy. In November 2011, he scored his first goal for the club in a 2–0 victory over Genk. During the second qualifying round of the 2012–13 UEFA Europa League season, he made his European debut against Differdange 03 in Luxembourg. At the age of 19, Van der Bruggen was named as Gent's new captain in 2013. On 21 May 2015, he made history with Gent, as he helped lead them to their first league title in their 115-year history.

=== Kortrijk ===
In January 2017, Van der Bruggen signed a four-and-a-half-year contract with KV Kortrijk.

=== Cercle Brugge ===
On 19 January 2021, having made 285 appearances at the highest level in Belgium, of which 143 for AA Gent and 142 for KV Kortrijk, Van Der Bruggen signed with Belgian Pro League club, Cercle Brugge. He made his debut for the club on 20 January 2021 against Royal Antwerp as his club lost 1–0.

== International career ==
Van Der Bruggen has represented the Belgian national youth teams up to the Belgium U21.

== Career statistics ==
As of 28 January 2019

Appearances and goals by club, season and competition
Club	Season	League		League cup		National cup		International		Total	
Club	Season	Apps	Goals	Apps	Goals	Apps	Goals	Apps	Goals	Apps	Goals
Gent	2010–11	0	0	1	0	0	0	0	0	1	0
Gent	2011–12	14	2	3	0	1	0	0	0	18	2
Gent	2012–13	24	1	8	1	3	0	3	0	38	2
Gent	2013–14	23	0	5	0	5	0	0	0	33	0
Gent	2014–15	16	1	8	0	4	0	0	0	28	1
Gent	2015–16	9	1	3	0	2	1	0	0	14	2
Gent	2016–17	7	0	0	0	1	0	3	0	11	0
Gent	Total	93	5	28	1	16	1	6	0	143	7
KV Kortrijk	2016–17	9	0	8	0	0	0	0	0	17	0
KV Kortrijk	2017–18	29	0	8	0	4	0	0	0	41	0
KV Kortrijk	2018–19	21	0	0	0	1	0	0	0	22	0
KV Kortrijk	Total	59	0	16	0	5	0	0	0	80	0
Career total		152	5	44	1	21	1	6	0	223	7

== Honours ==
Gent

- Belgian First Division: 2014–15
- Belgian Super Cup: 2015
