= Stefan Mitrović (footballer, born 1990) =

Serbian footballer (born 1990)

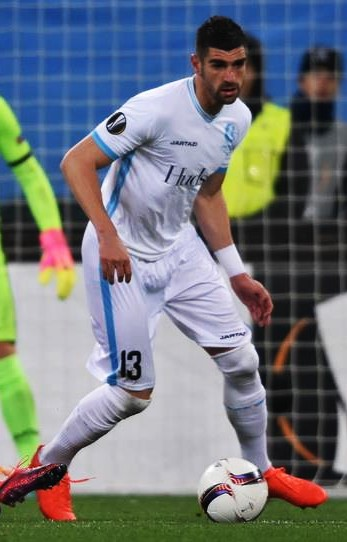
- Mitrović with Gent in 2015

Personal information
- Full name: Stefan Mitrović
- Date of birth: 22 May 1990 (age 36)
- Place of birth: Belgrade, SR Serbia, SFR Yugoslavia
- Height: 1.89 m (6 ft 2 in)
- Position: Centre-back

Team information
- Current team: Partizan
- Number: 23

Youth career
- 2003–2008: Red Star Belgrade
- 2008–2009: Rad

Senior career*
Years	Team	Apps	(Gls)
2010	Petržalka	9	(0)
2011	Zbrojovka Brno	8	(0)
2011–2012	Metalac Gornji Milanovac	21	(0)
2012–2013	Kortrijk	22	(3)
2013–2014	Benfica B	8	(0)
2014	→ Valladolid (loan)	16	(0)
2014–2015	SC Freiburg	14	(0)
2015–2018	Gent	68	(3)
2018–2021	Strasbourg	89	(3)
2021–2024	Getafe	65	(2)
2024–2026	Gent	35	(2)
2026–	Partizan	18	(0)

International career^{‡}
2014–2022	Serbia	36	(0)
- * Club domestic league appearances and goals as of 28 October 2026 ‡ National team caps and goals as of 28 November 2022

Stefan Mitrović (Serbian Cyrillic: Стефан Митровић, pronounced [stêfaːn mǐtroʋitɕ]; born 22 May 1990) is a Serbian professional footballer who plays as a centre-back for Serbian SuperLiga club Partizan.

== Club career ==
=== 2010s ===
On 9 June 2012, Mitrović signed a three-year contract with Kortrijk in the Belgian Pro League.

On 7 May 2013, he moved to Benfica on a five-year contract, joining a host of fellow countrymen. During his first six months, he only appeared for the reserve team. On 22 January 2014, he moved to Real Valladolid on a season-long loan.

On 16 July 2014, Mitrović signed with SC Freiburg for a €1.175 million transfer fee. On 4 October 2014, he debuted against Werder Bremen. Mitrović signed for French club RC Strasbourg from Belgian club Gent in June 2018.

=== 2020s ===
On 6 July 2021, Getafe announced the signing of Mitrović from Strasbourg. On 1 February 2024, Mitrović signed a new two-and-a-half-year contract with his former club, Gent.

== International career ==
On 31 May 2014, Mitrović debuted for the Serbia national team against Panama. The same year on 14 October, he took down the flag of "Greater Albania" during a UEFA Euro 2016 qualifying match in Belgrade that was flown over the pitch by a remote control drone.

In November 2022, he was selected in Serbia's squad for the 2022 FIFA World Cup in Qatar. He played in a group stage match against Cameroon, coming on as a sub in 55th minute, replacing Strahinja Pavlović.

== Career statistics ==
=== Club ===
As of 4 November 2026

Appearances and goals by club, season and competition
Club	Season	League			Cup		Continental		Other		Total	
Club	Season	Division	Apps	Goals	Apps	Goals	Apps	Goals	Apps	Goals	Apps	Goals
Petržalka	2009–10	Slovak Super Liga	9	0	0	0	—		0	0	9	0
Zbrojovka Brno	2010–11	Czech First League	8	0	0	0	—		0	0	8	0
Metalac Gornji Milanovac	2011–12	Serbian SuperLiga	21	0	1	0	—		0	0	22	0
Kortrijk	2012–13	Belgian Pro League	22	3	6	0	—		0	0	28	3
Benfica B	2013–14	Segunda Liga	8	0	0	0	—		0	0	8	0
Valladolid (loan)	2013–14	La Liga	16	0	0	0	—		0	0	16	0
Freiburg	2014–15	Bundesliga	14	0	2	0	—		0	0	16	0
Gent (loan)	2015–16	Belgian Pro League	21	1	5	0	7	0	5	0	38	1
Gent	2016–17	Belgian Pro League	28	2	2	0	13	1	10	1	53	4
Gent	2017–18	Belgian Pro League	19	0	2	0	2	1	0	0	23	1
Gent	Total		47	2	4	0	15	2	10	1	76	5
Strasbourg	2018–19	Ligue 1	34	0	5	0	0	0	0	0	39	0
Strasbourg	2019–20	Ligue 1	23	1	2	0	5	1	2	0	32	2
Strasbourg	2020–21	Ligue 1	32	2	1	0	0	0	0	0	33	2
Strasbourg	Total		89	3	8	0	5	1	2	0	104	4
Getafe	2021–22	La Liga	32	1	0	0	—		0	0	32	1
Getafe	2022–23	La Liga	22	0	0	0	—		0	0	22	0
Getafe	2023–24	La Liga	11	1	3	0	—		0	0	14	1
Getafe	Total		65	2	3	0	0	0	0	0	68	2
Gent	2023–24	Belgian Pro League	14	2	0	0	2	0	0	0	16	2
Gent	2024–25	Belgian Pro League	20	0	2	0	9	0	0	0	31	0
Gent	Total		34	2	2	0	11	0	0	0	47	2
Partizan	2025–26	Serbian SuperLiga	15	0	—		—		—		15	0
Partizan	2026–27	Serbian SuperLiga	3	0	1	1	5	1	—		9	2
Career total			375	13	32	1	43	4	17	1	459	19

=== International ===
Appearances and goals by national team and year
National team	Year	Apps	Goals
Serbia	2014	6	0
Serbia	2015	2	0
Serbia	2016	3	0
Serbia	2017	2	0
Serbia	2018	0	0
Serbia	2019	2	0
Serbia	2020	6	0
Serbia	2021	7	0
Serbia	2022	8	0
Total		36	0

== Honours ==
Strasbourg

- Coupe de la Ligue: 2018–19
