= Ahmet Karadayi =

Belgian footballer

Personal information
- Date of birth: 19 January 1996 (age 30)
- Place of birth: Heusden-Zolder, Belgium
- Height: 1.72 m (5 ft 8 in)
- Position: Midfielder

Team information
- Current team: Nazilli Belediyespor
- Number: 11

Youth career
- 2003–2010: Weerstand Koersel
- 2010–2011: Leopoldsburg
- 2011–2013: Sporting Hasselt

Senior career*
Years	Team	Apps	(Gls)
2013–2016	Sporting Hasselt	63	(9)
2016–2018	Geel	40	(10)
2018–2019	Kardemir Karabükspor	33	(0)
2019–2021	Kırşehir Belediyespor	57	(8)
2021–2022	Etimesgut Belediyespor	23	(0)
2022–	Nazilli Belediyespor	1	(0)
- * Club domestic league appearances and goals ‡ National team caps and goals as of 30 October 2022

Ahmet Karadayi (born 19 January 1996) is a Belgian professional footballer who plays as a midfielder for Turkish club Nazilli Belediyespor.

== Professional career ==
Born in Belgium and of Turkish descent, while his mother got Kurdish roots too. Karadayi begun playing football at his local club Weerstand Koersel at the age of 7, and worked his way to Sporting Hasselt in the 4th division in Belgium. He moved up a division, joining Geel in 2016.

Karadayi moved from AS Geel in the Belgian First Amateur Division to Kardemir Karabükspor in the Süper Lig on 16 January 2018, after a couple successful seasons. Karadayi made his professional debut for Kardemir Karabükspor in a 4–0 Süper Lig loss to Osmanlıspor on 16 March 2018.
