= Nana Akwasi Asare =

Ghanaian footballer (born 1986)

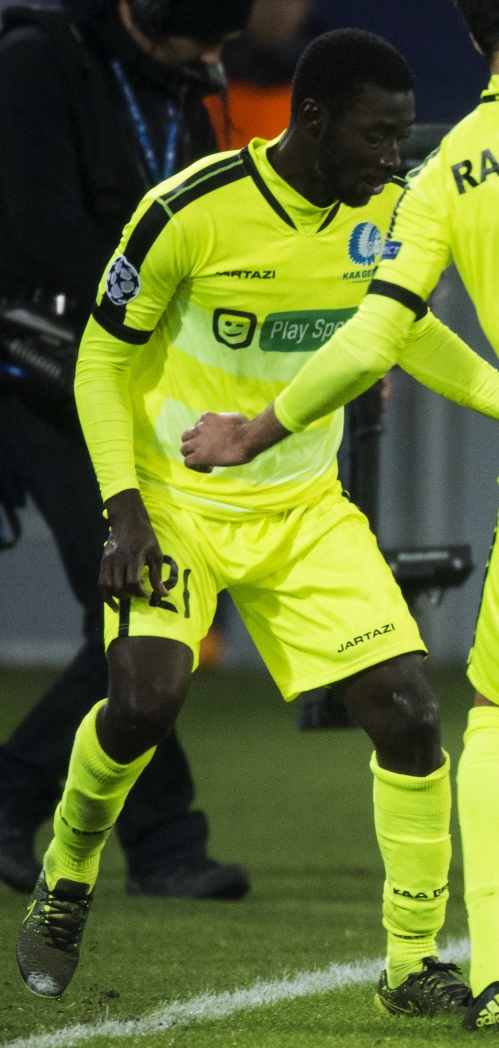
- Asare with Gent in 2015

Personal information
- Date of birth: 11 July 1986 (age 40)
- Place of birth: Kumasi, Ghana
- Height: 1.75 m (5 ft 9 in)
- Position: Left back

Youth career
- Cornerstones
- Feyenoord Fetteh

Senior career*
Years	Team	Apps	(Gls)
2003–2007	Feyenoord	0	(0)
2004–2005	→ Antwerp (loan)	24	(3)
2005–2007	→ Mechelen (loan)	36	(1)
2007–2009	Mechelen	52	(1)
2009–2013	Utrecht	102	(10)
2013–2020	Gent	215	(3)

International career^{‡}
2007–2012	Ghana	5	(0)
- * Club domestic league appearances and goals as of 19:35, 26 January 2021 (UTC) ‡ National team caps and goals as of 13:24, 8 August 2015 (UTC)

Nana Akwasi Asare (born 11 July 1986) is a Ghanaian former professional footballer who played as a left-back. He made over 100 appearances for Dutch club Utrecht, and more than 200 appearances for Belgian club Gent. Between 2007 and 2012 he made five appearances for the Ghana national team.

== Club career ==
Born in Kumasi, Asare has played for Feyenoord Fetteh, Feyenoord, Royal Antwerp, Mechelen, Utrecht and Gent.

Asare moved from Mechelen to Utrecht in May 2009. He signed a four-year contract with Gent in June 2013.

In September 2020, Asare's contract with Gent was terminated by mutual consent. Through seven seasons, including three seasons as team captain, he made 272 appearances for the club, including 215 in the Belgian First Division A, 24 in the Belgian Cup, 1 in the Belgian Super Cup and 32 in European competitions. When he left the club, he was also the player with the most European minutes ever for Gent, namely 2824 minutes.

== International career ==
Asare earned 5 caps for Ghana between 2007 and 2012. He was a squad member at the 2008 Africa Cup of Nations.

== Honours ==
Gent

- Belgian Pro League: 2014–15
- Belgian Super Cup: 2015
