= Thomas Matton =

Belgian footballer

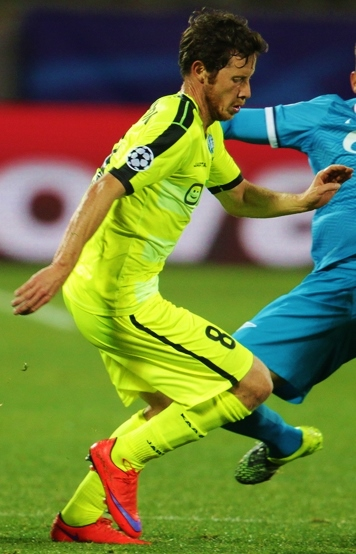
- Matton in 2015

Personal information
- Date of birth: 24 October 1985 (age 41)
- Place of birth: Horebeke, Belgium
- Height: 1.80 m (5 ft 11 in)
- Position: Attacking midfielder

Senior career*
Years	Team	Apps	(Gls)
2007–2008	OH Leuven	25	(12)
2008–2012	Zulte Waregem	68	(11)
2012–2015	KV Kortrijk	54	(8)
2015–2017	Gent	34	(5)
Total		181	(36)
- * Club domestic league appearances and goals

Thomas Matton (born 24 October 1985) is a Belgian former professional footballer who played as an attacking midfielder.

== Career ==
Matton got his youth training mainly at Club Brugge. He was a member of the generation of players such as Jason Vandelannoite, Glenn Verbauwhede and Nicolas Lombaerts. In 2006, he entered the first team of Club Brugge, but did not play any games.

On 21 May 2007, Matton signed a two-year contract at OH Leuven. At the end of April 2008, he signed a contract of four seasons at Zulte Waregem. In May 2012, he signed a two-year contract at KV Kortrijk.

On 10 February 2015, it was announced that Matton was transferred to Gent after Kortrijk had not been willing to prolong the contract of Matton. He signed in Gent for two years.

Matton finally announced his retirement on 8 December 2017 after successive injuries.
