= Danijel Milićević =

Bosnian footballer (born 1986)

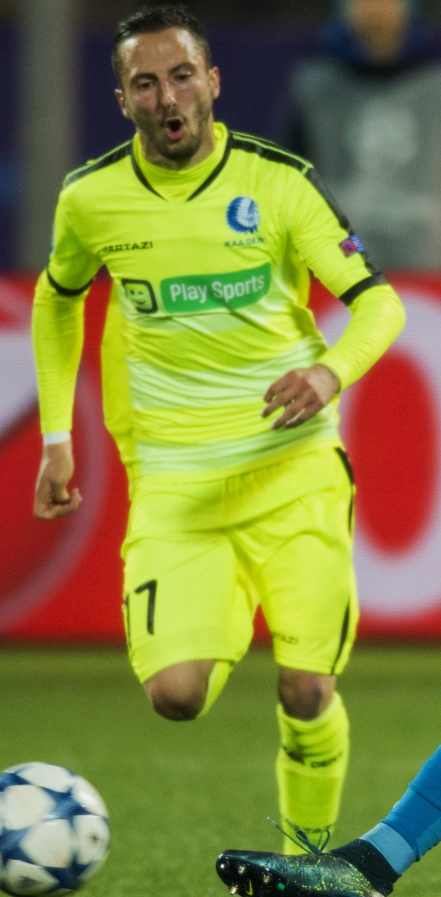
- Milićević with Gent

Personal information
- Full name: Danijel Milićević
- Date of birth: 5 January 1986 (age 40)
- Place of birth: Bellinzona, Switzerland
- Height: 1.71 m (5 ft 7 in)
- Position: Attacking midfielder

Youth career
- Biaschesi
- Bellinzona

Senior career*
Years	Team	Apps	(Gls)
2004–2006	Lugano	27	(4)
2006–2008	Yverdon	72	(6)
2009–2011	Eupen	81	(16)
2011–2014	Charleroi	75	(10)
2014–2018	Gent	126	(21)
2018	→ Metz (loan)	12	(0)
2018–2020	Eupen	43	(5)
2020–2021	Seraing	10	(0)
Total		446	(62)

International career
2004–2005	Switzerland U19	2	(1)
2005–2006	Switzerland U20	8	(1)
2006–2007	Switzerland U21	2	(0)
2016–2017	Bosnia and Herzegovina	3	(0)

Managerial career
- 2021–: Gent (assistant)
- 2025-2025: Gent (interim)
- * Club domestic league appearances and goals

Danijel Milićević (Bosnian pronunciation: [dǎnijel milîːtɕeʋitɕ]; born 5 January 1986) is a Bosnian-Swiss professional football coach and former player, who played as an attacking midfielder. His last coaching job was at Belgian Pro League side Gent, for whom he formerly played.

Milićević started his professional career at Lugano, before joining Yverdon in 2006. In 2009, he moved to Eupen. Two years later, he switched to Charleroi. In 2014, Milićević was transferred to Gent, who loaned him to Metz in 2018. Later that year, he went back to Eupen. In 2020, he signed with Seraing.

A former Swiss youth international, Milićević made his senior international debut for Bosnia and Herzegovina in 2016, earning 3 caps until 2017.

== Club career ==
=== Early career ===
Milićević started playing football at a local club Biaschesi, before joining youth setup of his hometown team Bellinzona. He made his professional debut playing for Lugano in 2004 at the age of 18.

In January 2006, he signed with Yverdon.

In January 2009, Milićević moved to Belgian side Eupen.

In the summer of 2011, he switched to Charleroi.

=== Gent ===
In January 2014, Milićević was transferred to Gent for an undisclosed fee. He made his official debut for the team on 18 January against Kortrijk. On 17 August, he scored his a brace in a triumph over Zulte Waregem, which were his first goals for Gent. He won his first trophy with the club on 21 May 2015, when they were crowned league champions for the first time in their history.

On 16 September, Milićević made his UEFA Champions League debut against Lyon and managed to score a goal.

In January 2016, he extended his contract until June 2019.

Milićević played his 100th game for the team on 13 August.

He scored his first career hat-trick on 20 September 2017 against Geel.

In January 2018, he was loaned to French outfit Metz until the end of season.

=== Later stage of career ===
In June 2018, Milićević returned to Eupen.

In October 2020, he signed with Seraing.

He announced his retirement from football on 17 June 2021.

== International career ==
Despite representing Switzerland at various youth levels, Milićević decided to play for Bosnia and Herzegovina at senior level.

In June 2016, his request to change sports citizenship from Swiss to Bosnian was approved by FIFA. Subsequently, he received his first senior call-up in August 2016, for a 2018 FIFA World Cup qualifier against Estonia, and debuted in that game on 6 September.

== Career statistics ==
=== Club ===
As of match played 3 April 2021

Appearances and goals by club, season and competition
Club	Season	League			National Cup		Continental		Other		Total	
Club	Season	Division	Apps	Goals	Apps	Goals	Apps	Goals	Apps	Goals	Apps	Goals
Lugano	2004–05	Swiss Challenge League	15	2	2	0	–		–		17	2
Lugano	2005–06	Swiss Challenge League	12	2	1	0	–		–		13	2
Lugano	Total		27	4	3	0	–		–		30	4
Yverdon	2005–06	Swiss Super League	17	3	–		–		–		17	3
Yverdon	2006–07	Swiss Challenge League	24	2	3	3	–		–		27	5
Yverdon	2007–08	Swiss Challenge League	31	1	3	0	–		–		34	1
Yverdon	Total		72	6	6	3	–		–		78	9
Eupen	2008–09	Belgian First Division B	11	5	–		–		–		11	5
Eupen	2009–10	Belgian First Division B	38	8	1	0	–		–		39	8
Eupen	2010–11	Belgian First Division A	32	3	0	0	–		–		32	3
Eupen	Total		81	16	1	0	–		–		82	16
Charleroi	2011–12	Belgian First Division B	29	4	1	0	–		–		30	4
Charleroi	2012–13	Belgian First Division A	26	3	2	0	–		–		28	3
Charleroi	2013–14	Belgian First Division A	20	3	1	0	–		–		21	3
Charleroi	Total		75	10	4	0	–		–		79	10
Gent	2013–14	Belgian First Division A	10	0	2	0	–		–		12	0
Gent	2014–15	Belgian First Division A	33	9	4	1	–		–		37	10
Gent	2015–16	Belgian First Division A	33	5	4	0	8 (Note: appearances in UEFA Champions League)	3 (Note: goals in UEFA Champions League)	1 (Note: appearance in Belgian Super Cup)	0	46	8
Gent	2016–17	Belgian First Division A	33	6	3	0	12 (Note: 4 appearances in UEFA Europa League qualifying, 8 appearances in UEFA Europa League)	3 (Note: goals in UEFA Europa League)	–		48	9
Gent	2017–18	Belgian First Division A	17	1	3	4	2 (Note: appearances in UEFA Europa League qualifying)	1 (Note: goal in UEFA Europa League qualifying)	–		22	6
Gent	Total		126	21	16	5	22	7	1	0	165	33
Metz (loan)	2017–18	Ligue 1	12	0	1	0	–		–		13	0
Eupen	2018–19	Belgian First Division A	20	0	1	0	–		–		21	0
Eupen	2019–20	Belgian First Division A	23	5	1	0	–		–		24	5
Eupen	Total		43	5	2	0	–		–		45	5
Seraing	2020–21	Belgian First Division B	10	0	1	0	–		–		11	0
Career total			446	62	34	8	22	7	1	0	503	77

=== International ===
As of match played 3 September 2017

Appearances and goals by national team and year
National team	Year	Apps	Goals
Bosnia and Herzegovina
Bosnia and Herzegovina	2016	1	0
Bosnia and Herzegovina	2017	2	0
Total		3	0

== Honours ==
Charleroi

- Belgian First Division B: 2011–12

Gent

- Belgian First Division A: 2014–15
- Belgian Super Cup: 2015
