= Burst =

Burst may refer to:

- Burst mode (disambiguation), a mode of operation where events occur in rapid succession
  - Burst transmission, a term in telecommunications
  - Burst switching, a feature of some packet-switched networks
  - Bursting, a signaling mode of neurons
- Burst phase, a feature of the PAL television format
- Burst fracture, a type of spinal injury
- Burst charge, a component of some fireworks
- Burst noise, type of electronic noise that occurs in semiconductors
- Burst finish, a two- or three-color faded effect applied to musical instruments e.g. sunburst (finish)
- Burst (village), a village in Erpe-Mere
- Burst.com, a software company
- Burst Radio, the University of Bristol student radio station
- Burst (band), a Swedish progressive metal band
  - Burst (Burst EP)
- Burst (Up10tion EP)
- "Burst", a song by Anthrax from Sound of White Noise
