= Etherloop =

Telecommunications hybrid technology

Etherloop is a hybrid technology combining aspects of Ethernet with other technologies to achieve a result not possible with either technology alone. EtherLoop was originally developed in the 1990s to allow high-speed data communication access to residential customers over standard twisted-pair telephone lines, also known as plain old telephone service (POTS). The technology development effort was begun at Northern Telecom in order to allow telephone companies to compete with the high-speed local data access then beginning to be offered by cable TV providers.

Etherloop is also a communications architecture with much broader applications. Technically, the initial EtherLoop adopted the protocol concepts of an Ethernet short-distance physical network with digital subscriber line (DSL) technology to facilitate the combination of voice and data transmission on legacy physical infrastructure of standard phone lines over distances of several kilometers. The project goal was to overcome the limitations of ADSL and HDSL while maintaining high-quality and high-speed data transmission. By combining features of Ethernet and DSL, and using digital signal processors (DSP) to enable the "maximum possible bandwidth out of any twisted pair copper pipe," EtherLoop became an architecture able to address a much wider variety of data networking requirements than the original 1990s-2000s application of data over POTS lines.

Other technologies termed "etherloop" have been developed, including use for automotive intra-vehicle communication in the 2020s, where a gigabit Ethernet physical network has been used with a proprietary time-sliced, network protocol for near real-time, redundant control and feedback of motor vehicle subsystems.

== History ==
EtherLoop was initially developed by Elastic Networks in the 1990s, to allow high-speed data communication access to residential customers over standard twisted-pair telephone lines. The technology development effort had been started by Jack Terry of Northern Telecom in order to allow telephone companies to compete with the high-speed local data access then beginning to be offered by cable TV providers.

In 1999, EtherLoop technology could, under the right conditions, facilitate speeds of up to 6 megabits per second over a distance of up to 6.4 km (21,000 feet).

== Description ==
The telco EtherLoop design adopted the basic concepts of digital subscriber line (DSL) communications technology plus Ethernet local area network technology to facilitate the combination of voice and data transmission on legacy physical infrastructure of standard twisted-pair telephone lines, or plain old telephone service (POTS).

Prior DSL implementations—Asymmetric DSL (ADSL) and High-bit-rate DSL (HDSL)—had technical issues that limited adoption in telephone networks. Sending high-speed data requires substantial power to drive the signal levels across copper lines. More signal delivered results in crosstalk with other copper lines in the typical 25 or 50 tightly bundled pairs used in telephone wiring.

For DSL services to reach their theoretical performance maximums, a near-ideal subscriber loop is required. In the real world, however, most subscriber loops are far from ideal. The wire may change gauge [ranging from 22 gauge to 26 gauge in POTS services]. This causes distortions and interference in a passing signal. It is also possible to have bridge taps on the loop, where a wire is attached to the main loop, but not connected to anything at the far end. Unconnected bridge taps cause reflections in the signal – some of the incoming signal will bounce backwards, and this reflection will interfere with the original signal.

The continuous power level required to operate DSL in the telco environment also increased the heat that needed to be dissipated over traditional phone service and increased the cost of the components.

Telco EtherLoop overcame some of the limitations while maintaining high-quality and high-speed data transmission by combining features of Ethernet and DSL, and using digital signal processors (DSP) to enable the "maximum possible bandwidth out of any twisted pair copper pipe," EtherLoop became an architecture able to address a much wider variety of data networking requirements than the original 1990s-2000s application of data over POTS lines. The initial EtherLoop implementation in 1999 used a half-duplex/bi-directional communication approach—but in only a single direction at a time, not simultaneously—plus burst packet delivery to mitigate several of the serious side effects of the legacy high-speed DSL offerings of the late 1990s. As such, EtherLoop transmission is less susceptible to interference caused by poor line quality, bridge taps, etc. in telephone company applications.

Later applications of EtherLoop in automotive systems overcame a different set of problems with EtherLoop-design solutions, as described in the Applications section below.

== Applications ==
=== Telecommunications ===
- EtherLoop was initially employed in the late-1990s to facilitate voice and data transmission by telephone companies on legacy physical POTS infrastructure. EtherLoop performs well in network runs that exceed Ethernet limits of ~150 m (490 ft), with up to 6.4 megabits per second achievable across a distance of up to 6.4 km (21,000 ft) 6.4 km (21,000 feet), and could theoretically achieve 10 megabits per second over standard telco wiring at shorter distances of approximately 910 m (3,000 ft).
- EtherLoop has been deployed by various internet service providers in areas where the loop length is very long or line quality is poor. Some EtherLoop modems (those made by Elastic Networks) offer a "Central Office mode", in which two modems are connected back to back over a phone line and used as a LAN extension. An example of a situation where this would be done is to extend Ethernet to a building that is too far to reach with straight Ethernet.

=== Automotive intra-vehicle communication ===
- Automotive intra-vehicle communication. In 2023, Tesla began using etherloop (styled, EtherLoop by Tesla) in their proprietary implementation in the Cybertruck light-duty truck. A gigabit Ethernet 2-wire physical network with a proprietary time-sliced, network protocol for near real-time control and feedback is used for all motor vehicle subsystems, including steer-by-wire, motor controls, all vehicle controllers, plus vehicle audio with active road-noise cancellation. Tesla achieved millisecond-scale latency with microsecond-scale synchronization, plus redundant control, since if one path is broken or defective, the data is moving bi-directionally over the physical loop. The transition to the EtherLoop architecture has dramatically reduced the total amount of wiring going across the vehicle (68 percent) even though the number of endpoints increased 35 percent over Tesla's previous newest vehicle, the Model Y. Average wire length is also much shorter, while total bandwidth is 200x the traditional 500 kbit/s data rate of traditional vehicle controllers. Moving to the EtherLoop architecture resulted in significant cost savings per vehicle built while increasing reliability and enhancing debug & service capabilities. Tesla uses a proprietary EtherLoop protocol in the 2023–24 Cybertruck, along with software-defined controllers. On their next iteration of the technology to be used on the Tesla next-generation vehicle, they intend to eliminate cross-car wires that are common with legacy automotive CAN bus architectures. With 1 Gbit/s bandwidth and low latency, the EtherLoop network is able to deliver high-fidelity audio with road-noise suppression through multiple speakers throughout the automobile; whereas legacy CAN bus automotive systems support up to only 10 Mbit/s bandwidth and audio signal must be provided via a separately-wired system.

== See also ==
- Ethernet in the first mile (especially 2BASE-TL)
