= N464 road (Belgium) =

Road in Belgium

The N464 is a regional road in Belgium between Sint-Lievens-Esse (N42b) and Herzele (N46). The road has a length of about 8 kilometers.
