= Verizon High Speed Internet =

Verizon logo

Verizon High Speed Internet is a digital subscriber line (DSL) Internet service offered by Verizon. It allows consumers to use their telephone and Internet service simultaneously over the same telephone line while benefiting from Internet connection speeds significantly faster than dial-up. This service was launched in 1998 in the North Jersey, Philadelphia, Pittsburgh and Washington D.C. areas, when Verizon was Bell Atlantic. Today, this service is available in all of Verizon's service area. It was originally known as Infospeed DSL and then Verizon Online DSL until it was changed to its current name in 2007 to avoid lawsuits.

Verizon High Speed Internet (DSL) has since been replaced with Verizon FiOS fiber-to-the-premises in some markets. As of Verizon's Q4 2015 financial report, FiOS accounts for 80% of residential wireline revenue, with DSL and other copper products earning the remainder.

== Availability ==
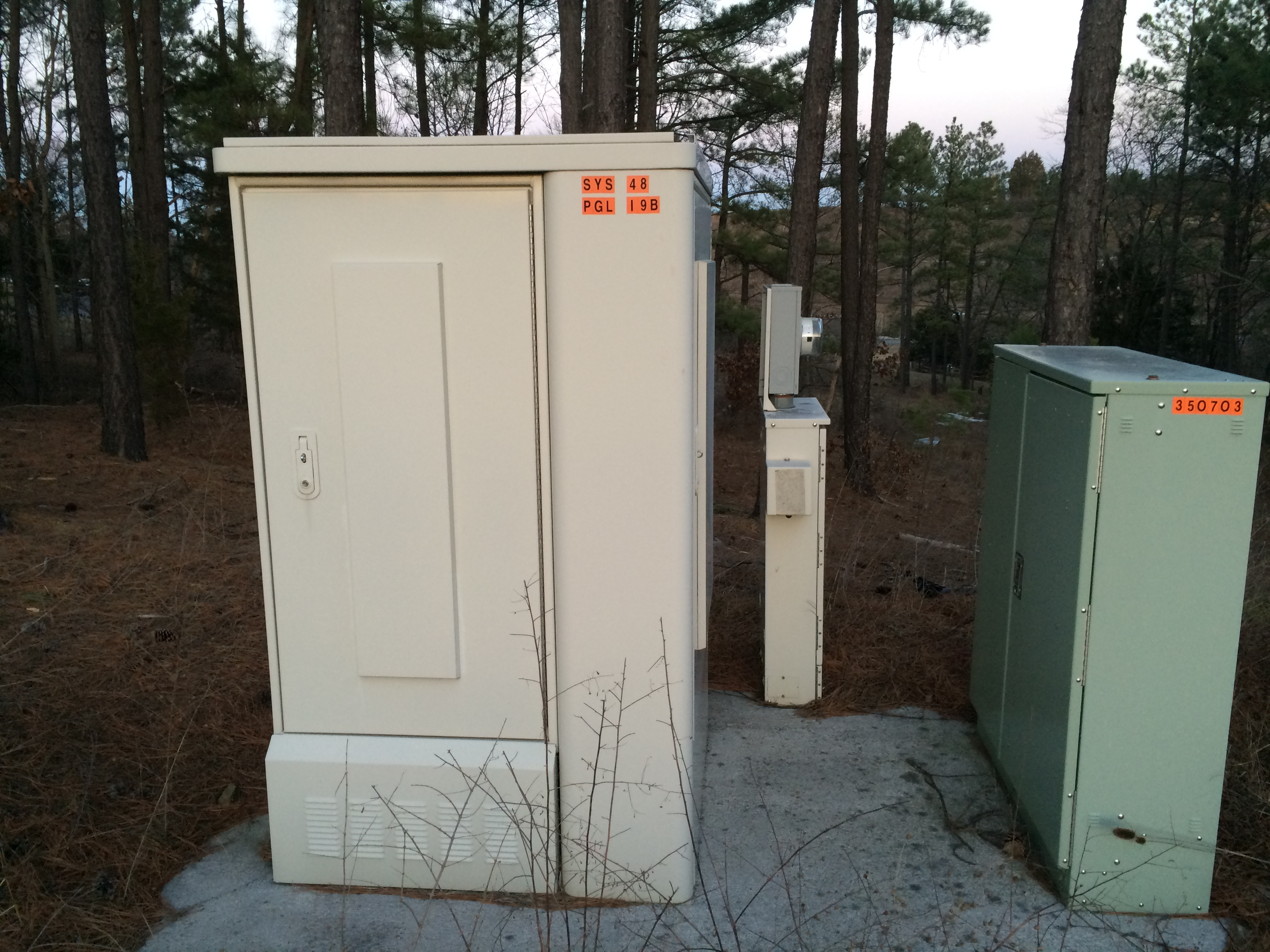
A remote terminal (RT) owned by Verizon

Verizon High Speed Internet is available in Delaware, Massachusetts, Maryland, New York, New Jersey, Pennsylvania, Rhode Island, Virginia, and Washington, D.C. where Verizon has coverage. Availability and speed are determined by the presence of a DSLAM in the local central office or remote terminal and the overall local loop length/distance from the C.O./RT to the customer premises. Maximum DSL connection speed decreases as the loop length increases.

The official maximum loop length for Verizon High Speed Internet is 18,000 feet (5,500 m) from the central office or remote terminal. Details of the outside plant including wire gauge, the presence of bridge taps, repeaters, load coils, or other devices that augment the voiceband telephone signal can affect DSL service availability and quality.

In areas where FiOS is offered, DSL service is no longer available to new customers.

== Service offer wings ==
Customers, depending on local equipment, condition of the local loop, and distance from the DSLAM, receive one option in the High Speed Internet Category, and one in the High Speed Internet Enhanced category. Enhanced Service is $10 more, and phone service is required for both. However, for business/commercial customers, Verizon doesn't require phone service, and offers different tiers.

Verizon also leases out their DSL lines for other 3rd party competitive local exchange carriers. Customers can receive DSL services from those CLECs, using Verizon's infrastructure.

Due to Verizon's asymmetic digital subscriber line (ADSL), download speeds are faster than upload speeds.

== Technical implementation ==
Verizon High Speed Internet utilizes ADSL or ADSL2+, depending on the age of the local DSLAM. ATM is used as the transport protocol from the DSL modem through the DSLAM. Authentication is implemented using PPPoE.

Verizon utilizes DSLAM's from Alcatel-Lucent and Adtran, as well as other vendors. The Alcatel-Lucent ASAM7300 and Adtran Total-Access 5000 are commonly deployed within central offices.

Verizon has not deployed VDSL/VDSL2+ as an upgrade to its existing DSL. VDSL/VDSL2+ has been used in condominiums and apartment complexes where direct fiber to the home is impossible to deploy; instead a VDSL connection is made to the building's central hub, which is in-turn connected fiber-optically. It is branded as part of FiOS service.

== Criticism ==
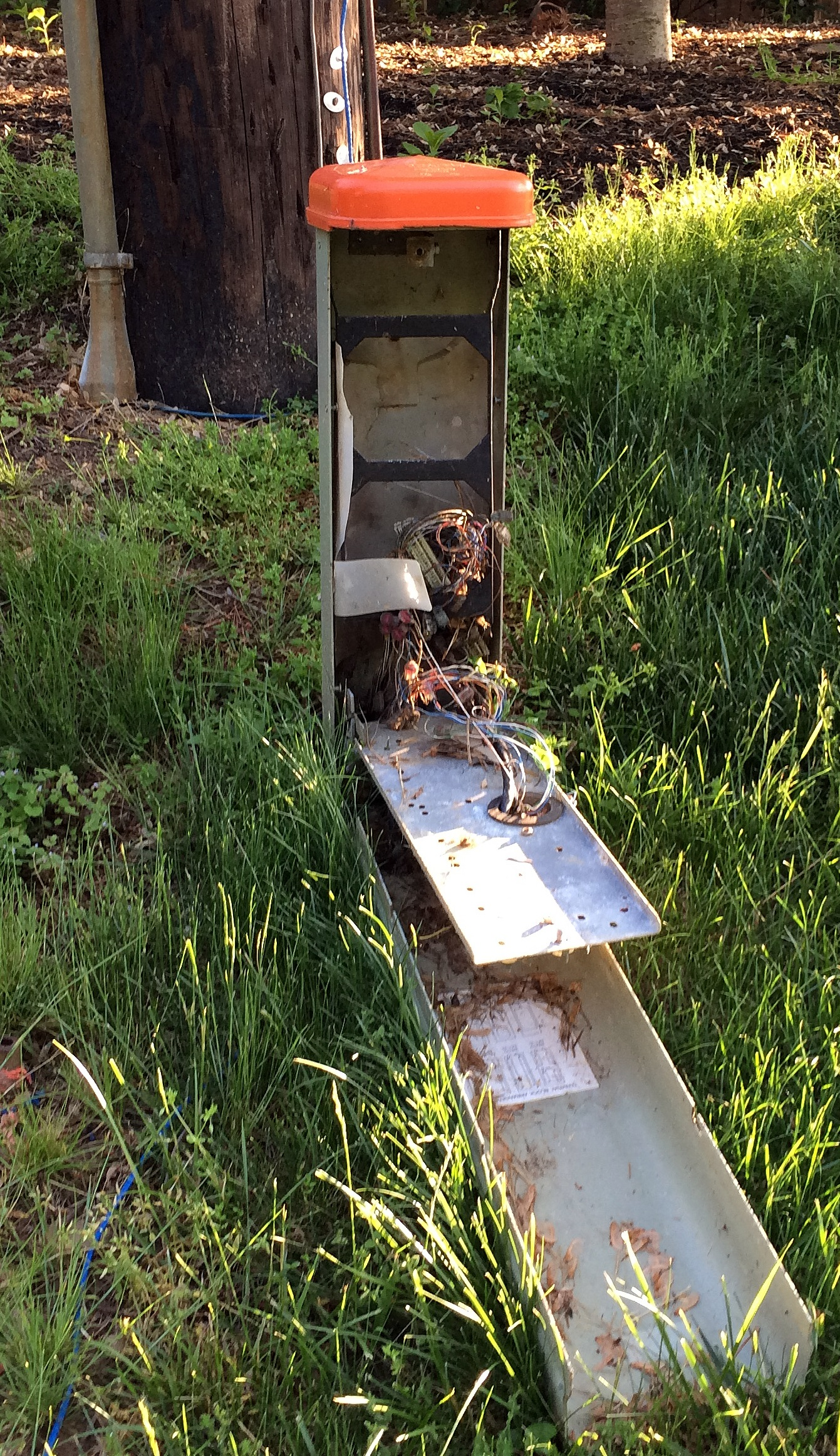
A damaged copper telephone local loop pedestal owned by Verizon

=== Neglect of copper local loop infrastructure ===
Since launching its fiber to the home service FiOS, industry insiders and experts have noted that Verizon has neglected its copper local loop infrastructure footprint-wide, including in areas yet to receive FiOS. Verizon's copper network maintenance and upgrade budget (which includes DSL and POTS services) was estimated to be roughly $3.50 per access line by the Communications Workers of America. The CWA filed a letter of concern with 11 public utility regulators regarding Verizon's lack of concern for the copper local loop and associated infrastructure. Rural communities in New Jersey filed a joint petition of complaint with the NJ Board of Public Utilities in order to investigate Verizon's apparent discontinuation of copper local loop maintenance; issues reported by the towns residents include loss of service during poor weather, static on the line, lack of audible voice transmission, and interruption or loss of DSL service.

Verizon has also refused to repair the copper local loop or replace the local loop infrastructure with fiber in the event of storm damage. In the aftermath of Hurricane Sandy, Verizon refused to rebuild the copper local loop infrastructure in New York's Fire Island. Instead, Verizon planned on requiring their telephone customers in the affected area to use VoiceLink, a feature-limited service which delivers landline phone service over the Verizon Wireless network. The service has limitations, including an inability to use data-based services (such as DSL and caller ID). Public backlash resulted in Verizon reversing this decision, and announcing that it planned to offer FiOS on Fire Island. Other areas affected by the storm did not see such a resolution; Comcast subsequently took advantage of the situation by announcing that it had expanded and refurbished its operations across the Jersey Shore.

=== 2-year contracts and billing practices ===
Some analysts see Verizon's lowest DSL prices merely as introductory "bait and switch" loss leader campaigns. Verizon offers High Speed Internet (DSL) under 24-month contract that, when expired, jumps to a higher monthly rate (although Verizon does offer a no-contract option at a slightly higher monthly rate).
