= Timeslicing =

Timeslicing or time slicing may refer to:

- Time slice or preemption, a technique to implement multitasking in operating systems
- Time slicing (digital broadcasting), the apparent simultaneous performance of two or more data streams in digital video broadcasting
- Time slice photography or bullet time, a technique creating the illusion of frozen, or slowly progressing, time in motion video
- TIMESLICE, a CONFIG.SYS configuration directive in OS/2

== See also ==
- A Slice at a Time, science fiction story
