= Godveerdegem =

- Village
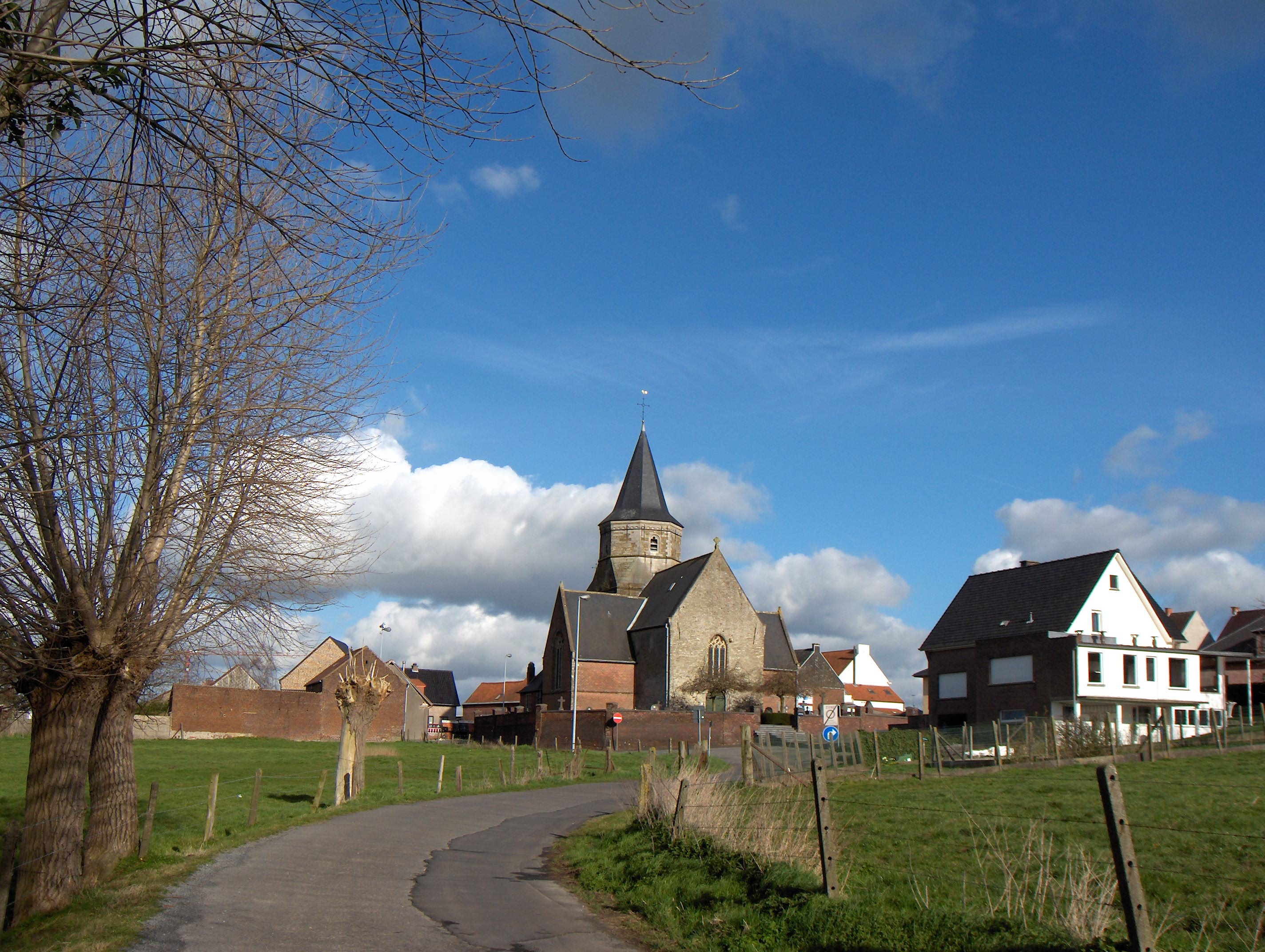
- Saint Paul's Conversion Church of Godveerdegem (2008)

- Location in Belgium
- Coordinates: 50°52′N 3°49′E
- Country: Belgium
- Region: Flemish Region
- Province: East Flanders
- Municipality: Zottegem

Area
  - Total: 3.34 km^{2} (1.29 sq mi)

Population (2021)
  - Total: 1,317
  - Density: 394/km^{2} (1,020/sq mi)
- Time zone: CET

Godveerdegem is a village belonging to the municipality of Zottegem. It is located on the Molenbeek-Ter Erpenbeek in the Denderstreek and in the Flemish Ardennes, the hilly southern part of the province of East Flanders, Belgium.

The Molenbeek-Ter Erpenbeek has its source in Godveerdegem.

== History ==
The village was first mentioned in 1776 as Gotferthengem. It was first a heerlijkheid, and was later elevated to a barony.

The Saint Paul's Conversion Church of Godveerdegem dates back to at least 1176. In 1962, the Belgian Government classified it as an important cultural asset.

In 1970, the municipality merged into Zottegem. The former municipality covered an area of 3.27 square kilometres (1.26 sq mi).
