= Burst (village) =

- Village
- Erpe-Mere in East-Flanders
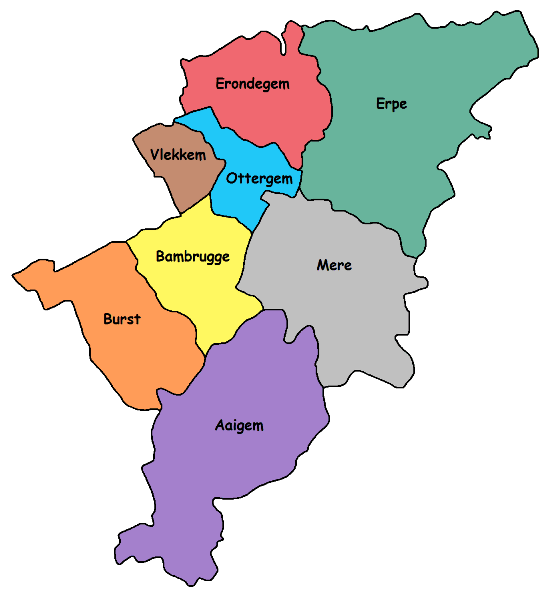
- Localisation of Burst in Erpe-Mere

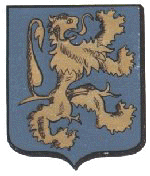
- Coat of arms

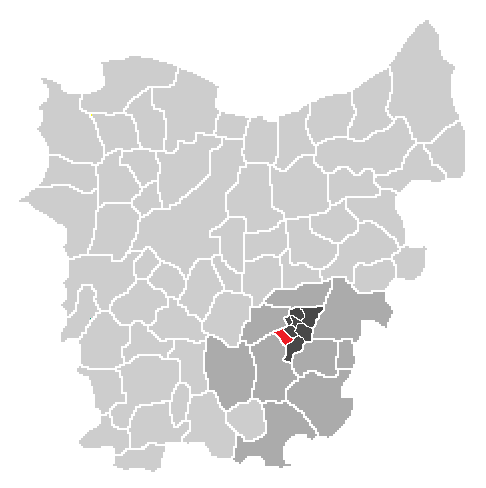
- Localisation of Burst in the community of Erpe-Mere in the arrondissement of Aalst in the province of East-Flanders.
- Country: Belgium
- Region: Flanders
- Province: East Flanders
- Arrondissement: Aalst
- Municipality: Erpe-Mere

Area
  - Total: 3.83 km^{2} (1.48 sq mi)
- Elevation: 0 m (0 ft)

Population (2003)
  - Total: 2,968
  - Density: 776/km^{2} (2,010/sq mi)
- Source: NIS
- Postal code: 9420

Burst is a sub-municipality of Erpe-Mere in Belgium. It is located on the Molenbeek in the Denderstreek, southeast of East Flanders and belongs to the Arrondissement of Aalst. It is bordered by the sub-municipalities of Bambrugge and Aaigem, as well as the municipalities of Herzele (sub-municipalities Ressegem and Borsbeke) and Sint-Lievens-Houtem (sub-municipalities Zonnegem and Vlierzele). Burst had 2968 inhabitants on 1 January 2003 and an area of 3.83 km. The population density was 776 / km ².

== History ==
The name Burst was first found in a charter of the Sint-Pietersabdij (Abbey) in Ghent. In this document of 1042 it is said that the village Burste is in the neighbourhood of a river with the same name, the "Bursitia juxta fluviolum Burste". It was not until a century later however, in 1151, that Burst was described under its present name, and the village was in the following decades, also named in several documents as Borst, Bost and Bust. The village had 125 farms in 1846, including some large ones. At that time there was a wheat windmill, three breweries and three distilleries in the village. At the beginning of the 19th century, the village had 304 inhabitants, and by the beginning of the 20th century it had 963 inhabitants.

== Landmarks ==
In Burst the Sint-Martinus Church can be found. Burst belongs to deanery of Lede. In 2011, there were still nine chapels, and most were still in good condition, but there were also some that are not maintained. There is also a cave in Burst.

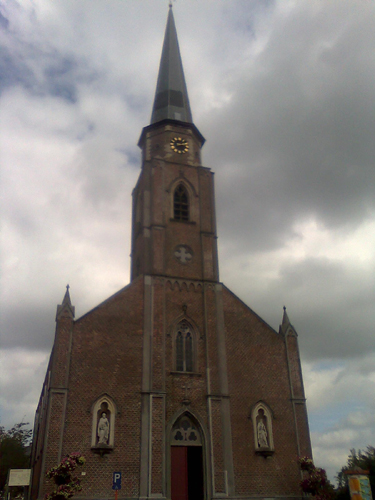
The church of Burst front view

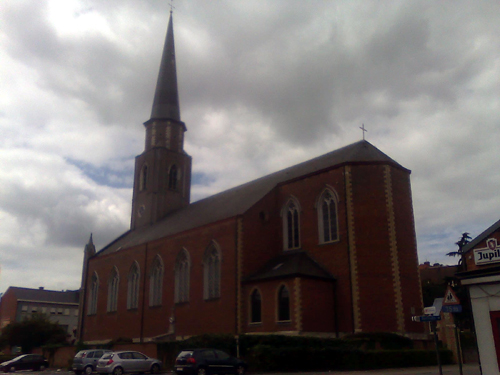
The church of Burst side-view

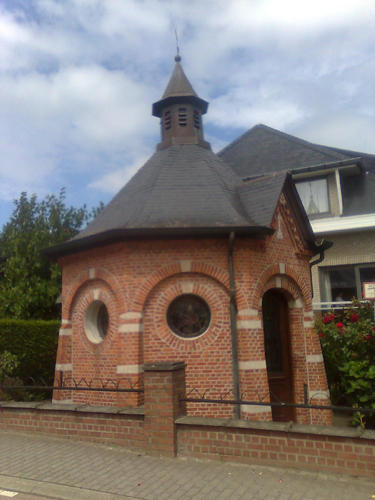
The little chapel halfway Gentsestraat

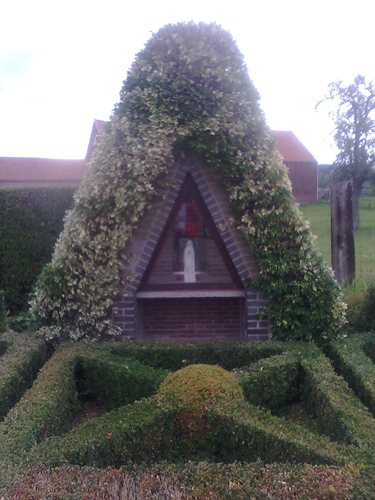
The little chapel at the end of Gentsestraat

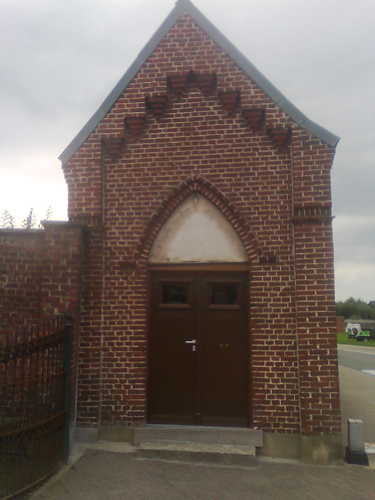
The little chapel at the begin of Dorent

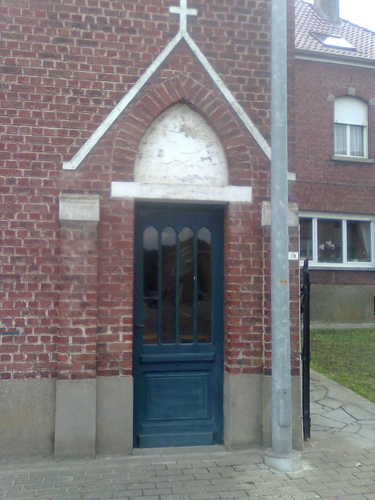
The little chapel halfway Dorent

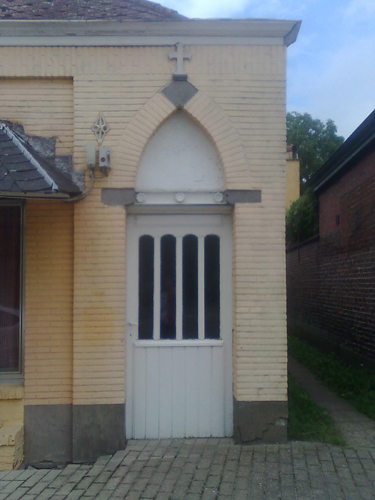
The little chapel at the end of Dorent

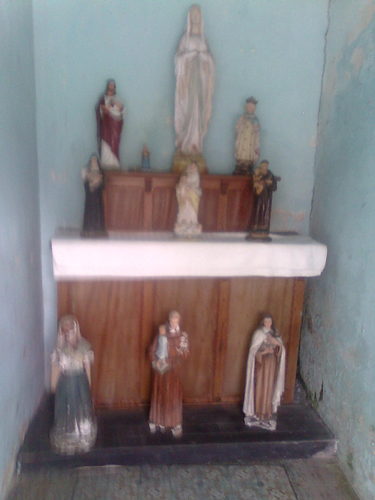
The bad condition in the little chapel at the end of Dorent

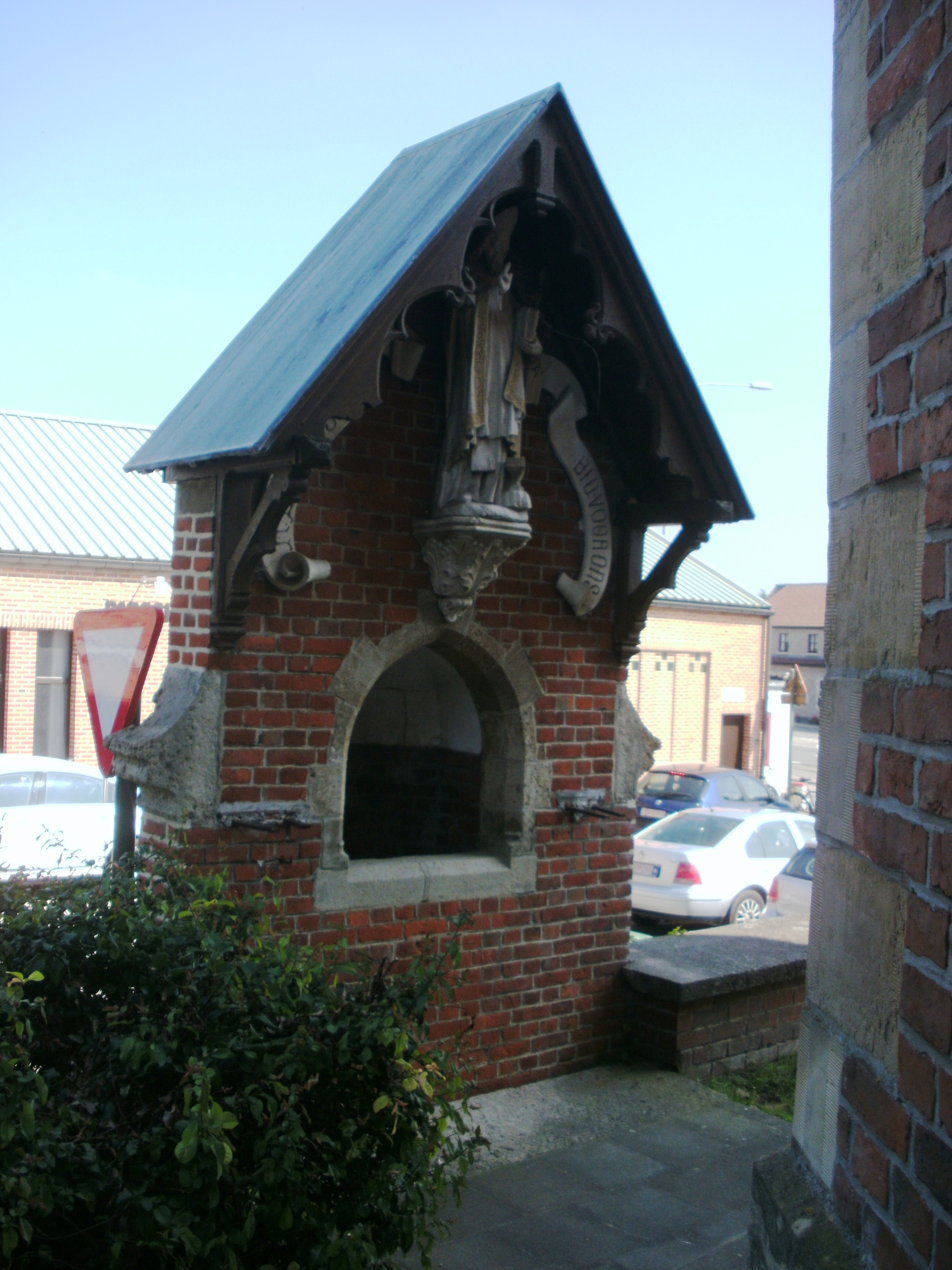
The little chapel at Kerkstraat

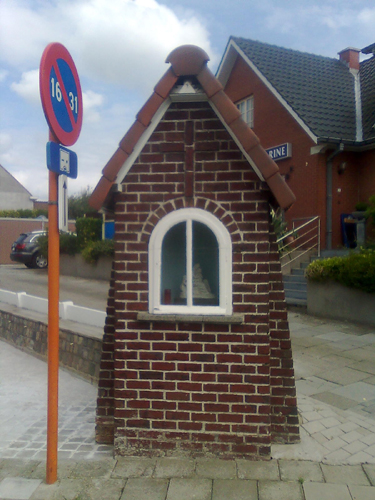
The little chapel at Stationsstraat

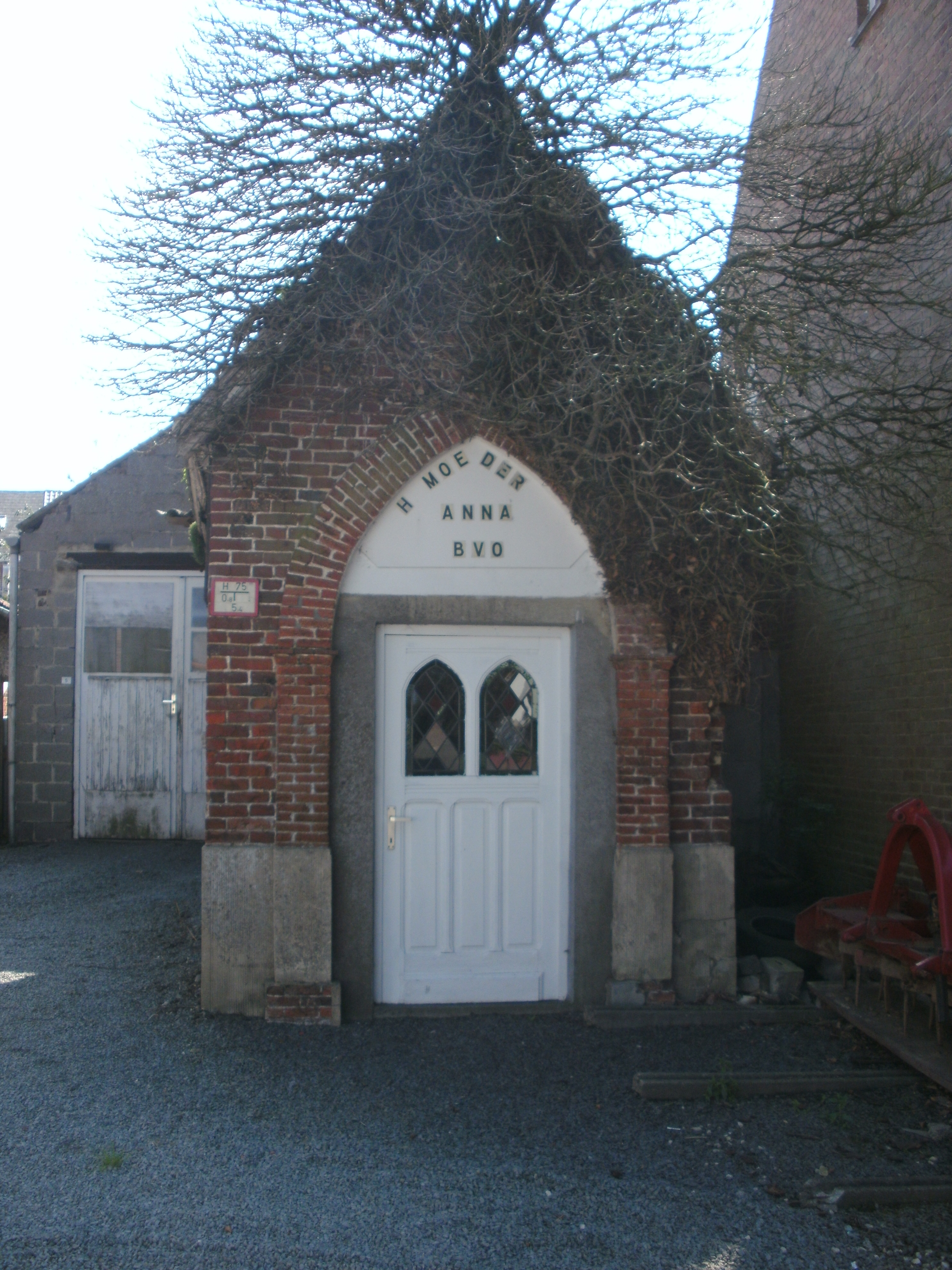
The little chapel at Stokt

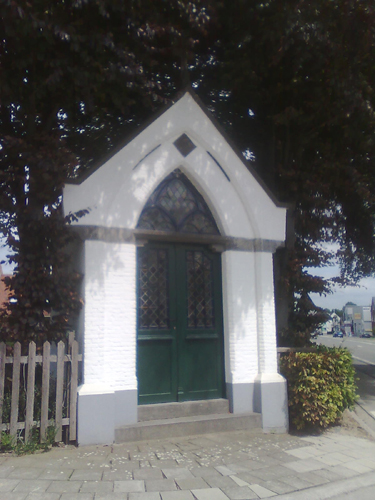
The little chapel at Akkerstraat

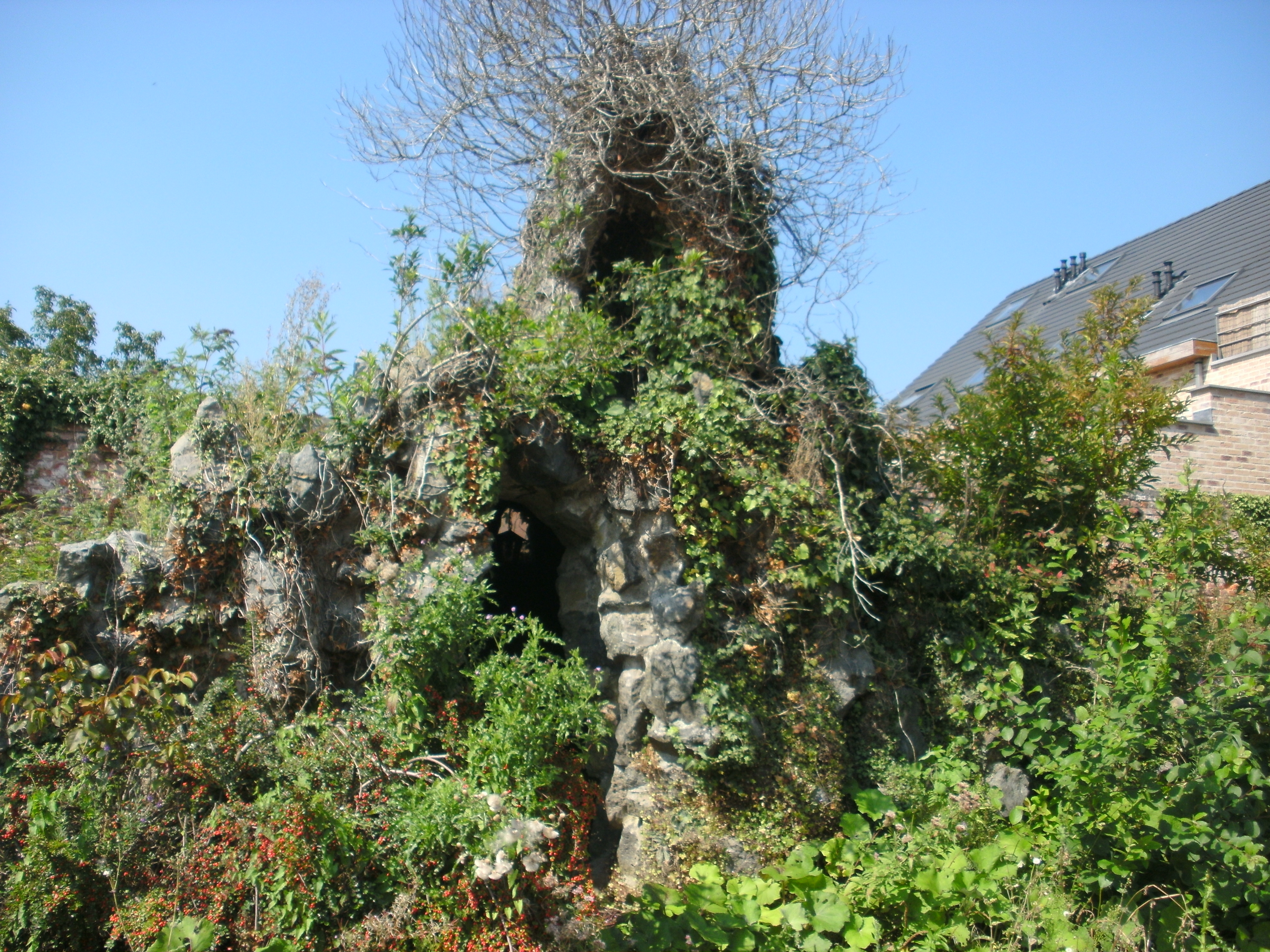
The cave of Burst

== Tourism ==
The Molenbeekroute cycle track network runs through Burst. Molenbeekroute is known primarily for the mills of the municipality Erpe-Mere and two brooks located there, both of them named Molenbeek (mill brook).

== Sport ==
The football club KFC Olympic Burst is currently (2012) active in East Flanders Division Three in the Belgian Provincial leagues.
