= Molenbeek-Ter Erpenbeek =

Brook from Godveerdegem to Hofstade, Belgium

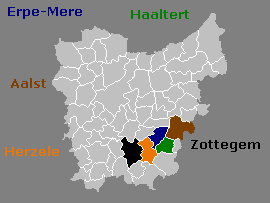
- East Flanders, in color the municipalities of the basin of the Molenbeek-Ter Erpenbeek.

Location
- Country: Belgium

Physical characteristics
- Source
  - location: Godveerdegem
- Mouth
  - location: Dender in Hofstade
  - coordinates: 50.9549°N 4.0320°E
- Length: 25 km (16 mi)
- Basin size: 54.74 km^{2} (21.14 sq mi)

Basin features
- Progression: Dender→ Scheldt→ North Sea

The Molenbeek-Ter Erpenbeek or in popular language Molenbeek (English: Millbrook-Ter Erpenbrook) is a brook in the Denderstreek region of Belgium. The stream has a length of approximately 25 kilometers. The source of the Molenbeek is in Godveerdegem and the delta is located at Hofstade. This brook is not to be confused with a 22-km water body called Molenbeek, which also flows through Erpe-Mere (and Herzele). The 22-km Molenbeek is part of the Drie Molenbeken drainage basin.

== Basin ==
The basin of the Molenbeek is located in the province of East Flanders and flows through the municipalities of Zottegem (Godveerdegem, Erwetegem, and Grotenberge), Herzele (Herzele, Sint-Lievens-Esse, Woubrechtegem, and Ressegem), Haaltert (Heldergem, Kerksken, and Haaltert), Erpe-Mere (Aaigem, Mere, and Erpe) and Aalst (Aalst and Hofstade).

The Molenbeek is part of the Molenbeek Erpe-Mere drainage basin, which is itself part of the Dender basin. The basin of the Molenbeek has an area of approximately 5474 hectares. The Molenbeek flows into the Dender at Hofstade.

From its source in Godveerdegem to the delta in Hofstade, the Molenbeek has the following tributaries: Plankebeek, Meilegembeek, De Burg's Heerendijkbeek, Grep, Holbeek, Steenbeek, and Zijpbeek.

== Landmarks ==
- Due to the geography of the area, there are eight water mills in Erpe-Mere on the Molenbeek, of which six are protected by law. One of mills which was not protected has been converted into a house.
- On the Koudenberg, one of the highest hills of the community, there is a windmill that is protected by law. It was re-mounted on its base in 2006 after being restored in 2004 by a studio in Roeselare. The Kruiskoutermolen was restored in 2006 and is operational. It can be visited by appointment with the tourist service.
- There is also a water tower in Erpe in the basin of de Molenbeek.

Place	Name(s)	Address	Type	Protected	Info
Aaigem	Engelsmolen; Molen te Dalhem; Molen te Dalme	Engelsmolen 1	Overshot watermill	Yes	It was originally a wheat mill, oil mill, and a flax attrition mill Later on it was only a wheat mill
Aaigem	Ratmolen; Waterrat	Ratmolenstraat 42	Overshot watermill	Yes	It was originally a wheat mill and an oil mill Later on it was only a wheat mill
Aaigem	Zwingelmolen	Aaigembergstraat 10	Overshot watermill	No	It was originally a flax attrition mill Later on it became a chicory mill The mill wheel has been removed It has been renovated as a house
Erpe	Cottemmolen	Molenstraat 36	Overshot watermill	Yes	It was originally a wheat mill and an oil mill Later on it was only a wheat mill
Erpe	Van Der Biestmolen	Dorpsstraat 3	Overshot watermill	No	Wheat mill
Mere	De Graevesmolen	Bosstraat 25	Overshot watermill	Yes	Wheat mill and an oil mill
Mere	Gotegemmolen	Gotegemstraat 1	Overshot watermill	Yes	Wheat mill
Mere	Kruiskoutermolen; Jezuïtenmolen; Molen Van Der Haegen	Schoolstraat	Post windmill with open foot	Yes	Wheat mill
Mere	Molen te Broeck 't Hof Schuurke	Wilgendries 6	Overshot watermill	Yes	Wheat mill

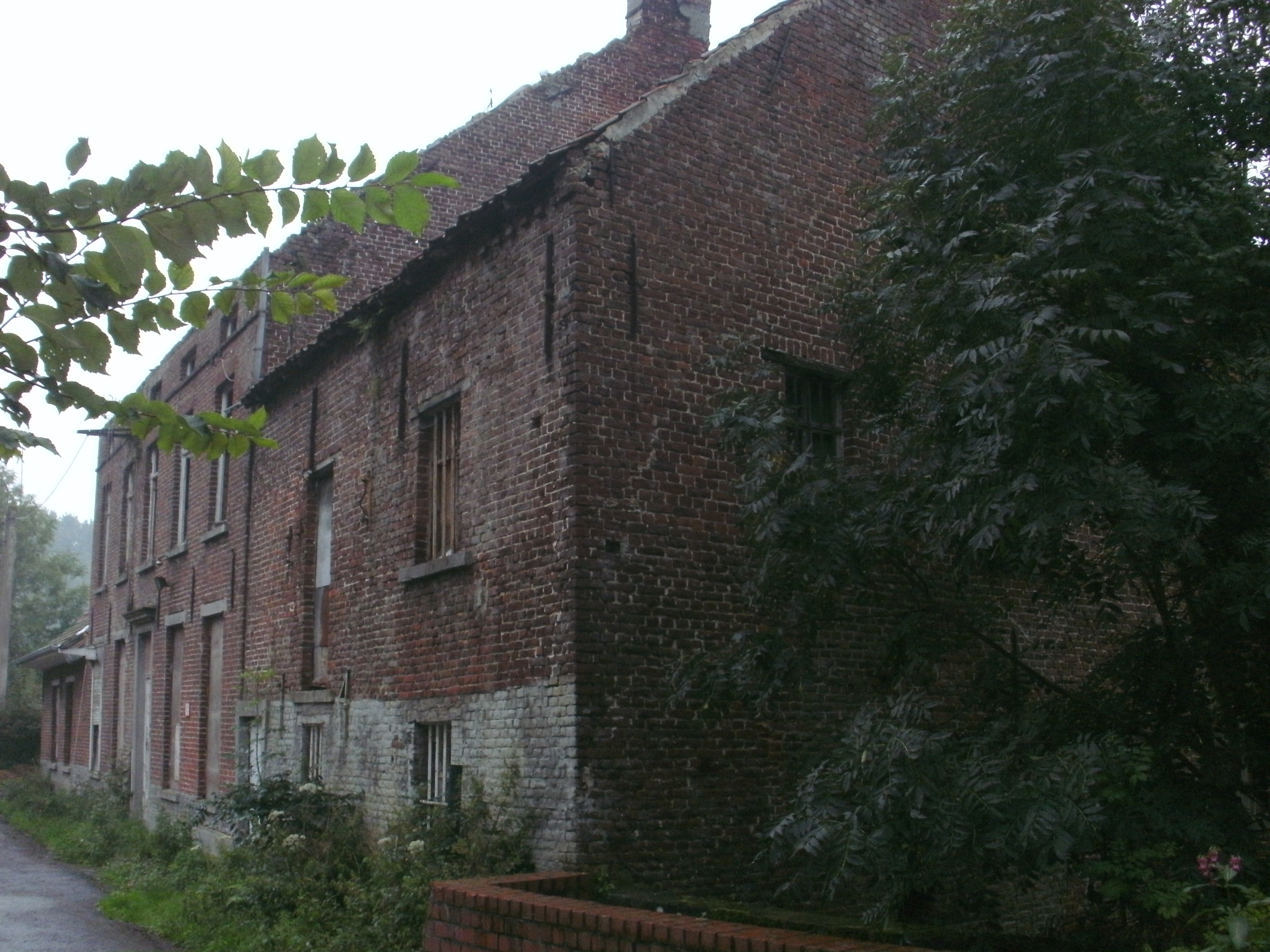
Engelsmolen at Aaigem

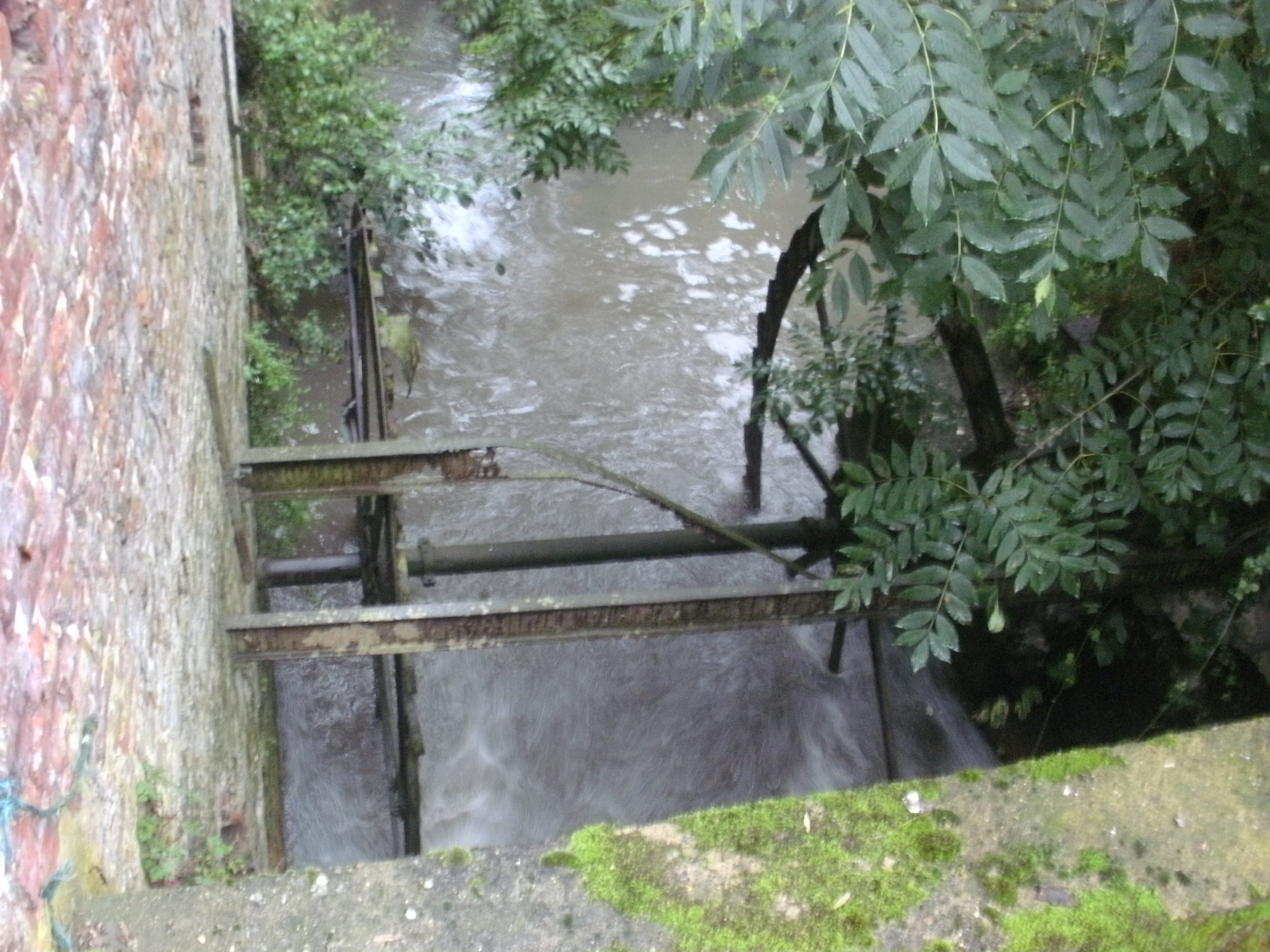
Mill wheel of the Engelsmolen at Aaigem

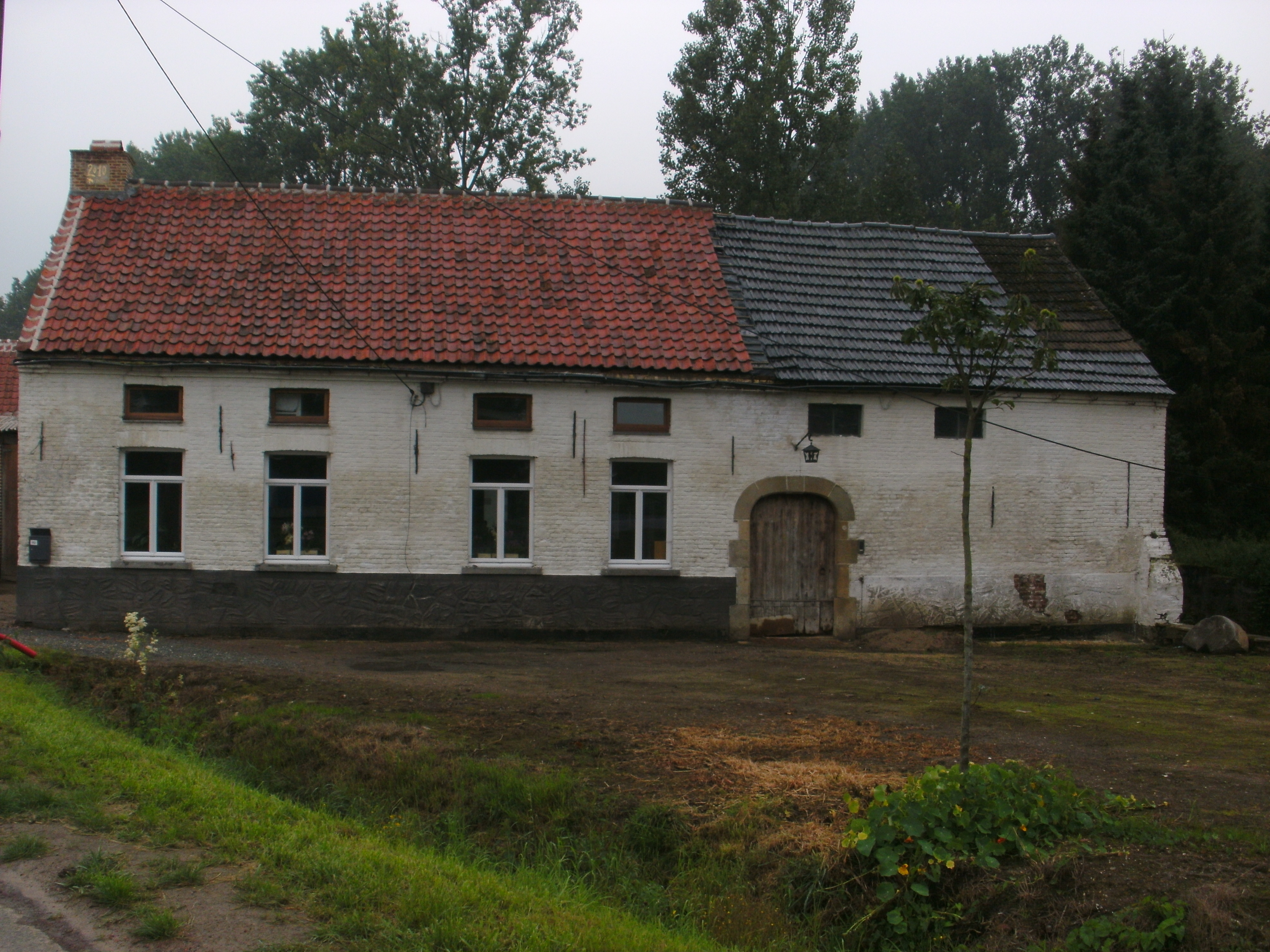
Ratmolen at Aaigem

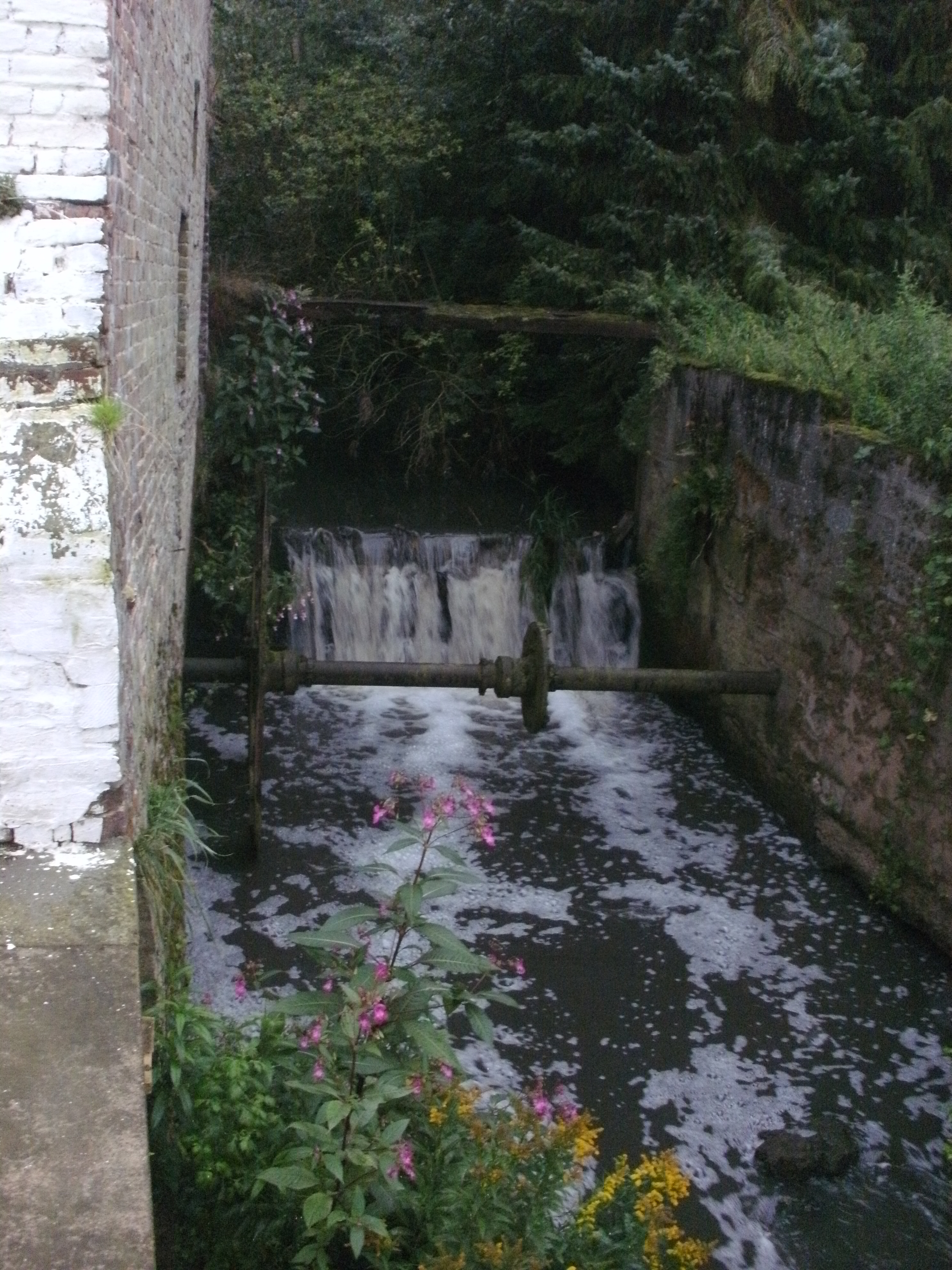
Mill wheel of the Ratmolen at Aaigem

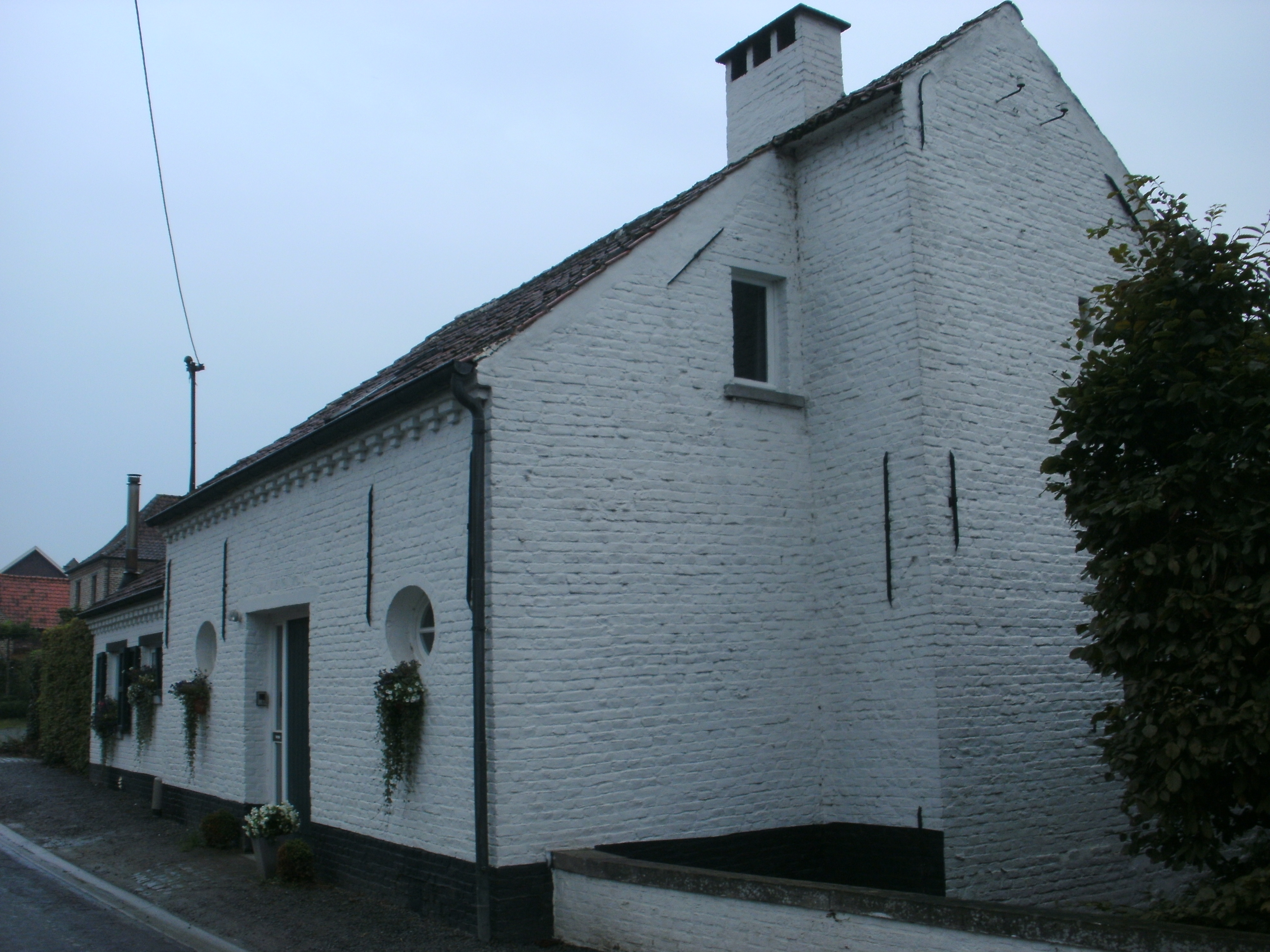
Zwingelmolen at Aaigem

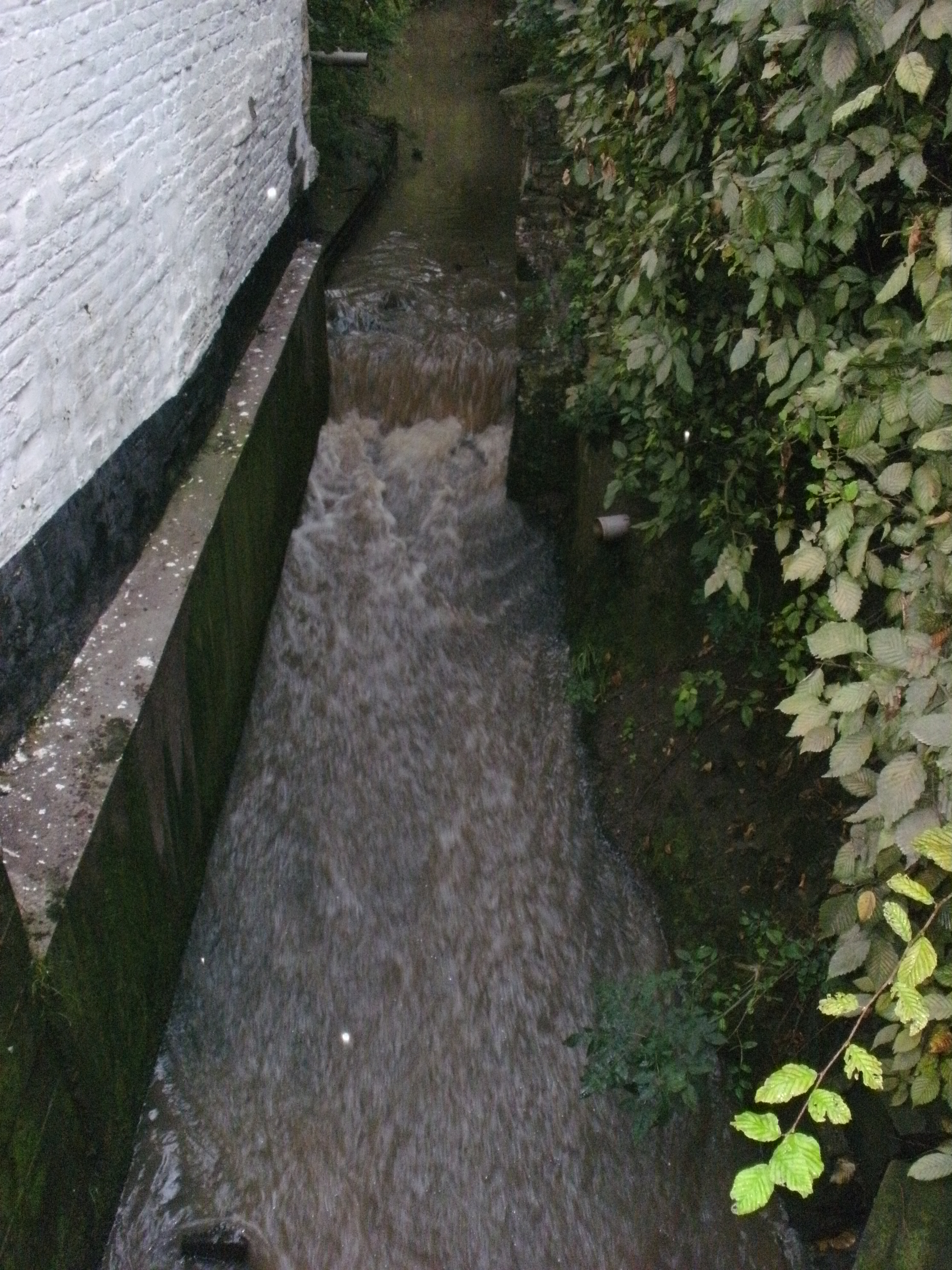
Place where the mill wheel of the Zwingelmolen once was at Aaigem

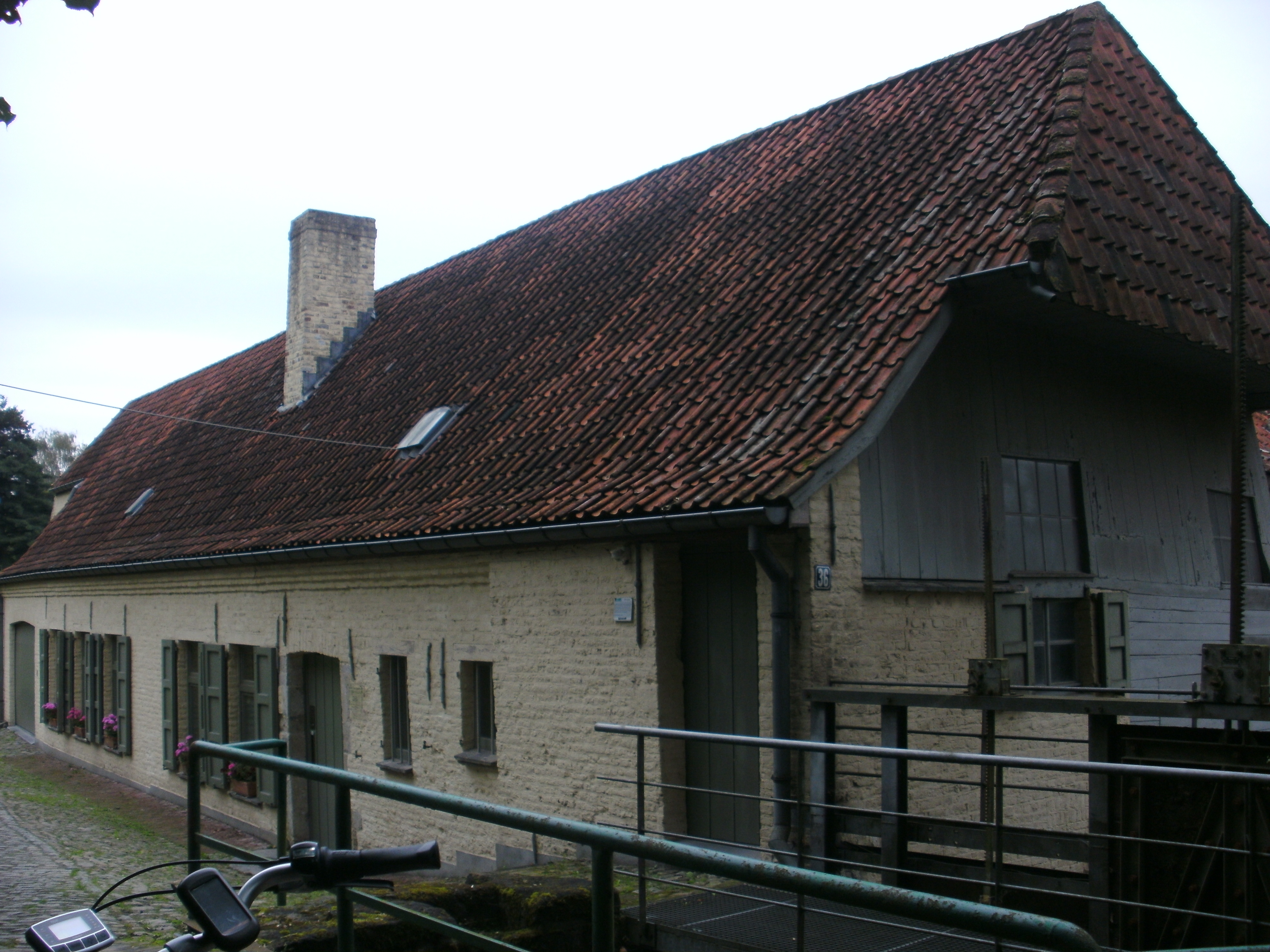
Front view of the Cottemmolen at Erpe

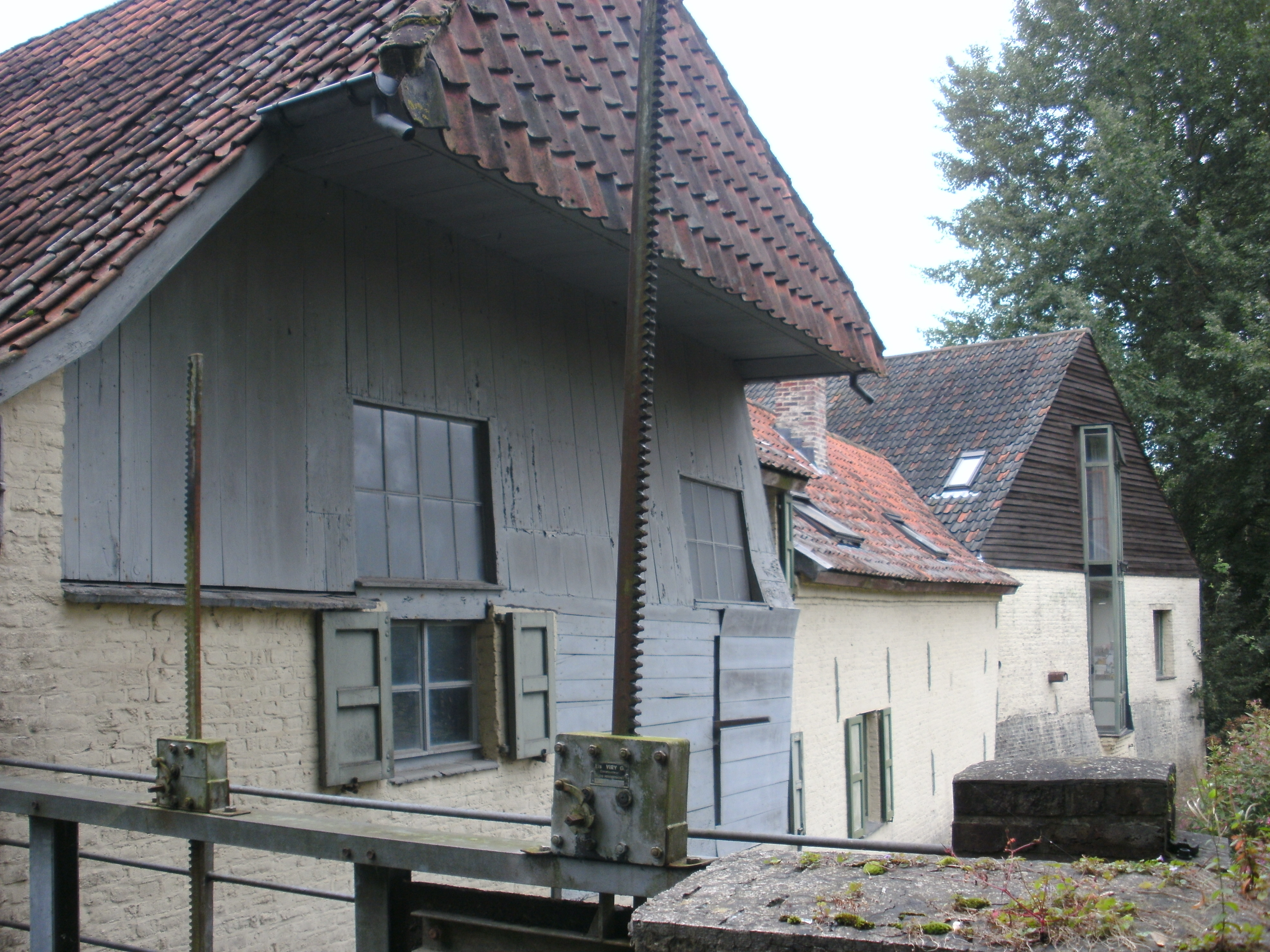
Side-view of the Cottemmolen at Erpe

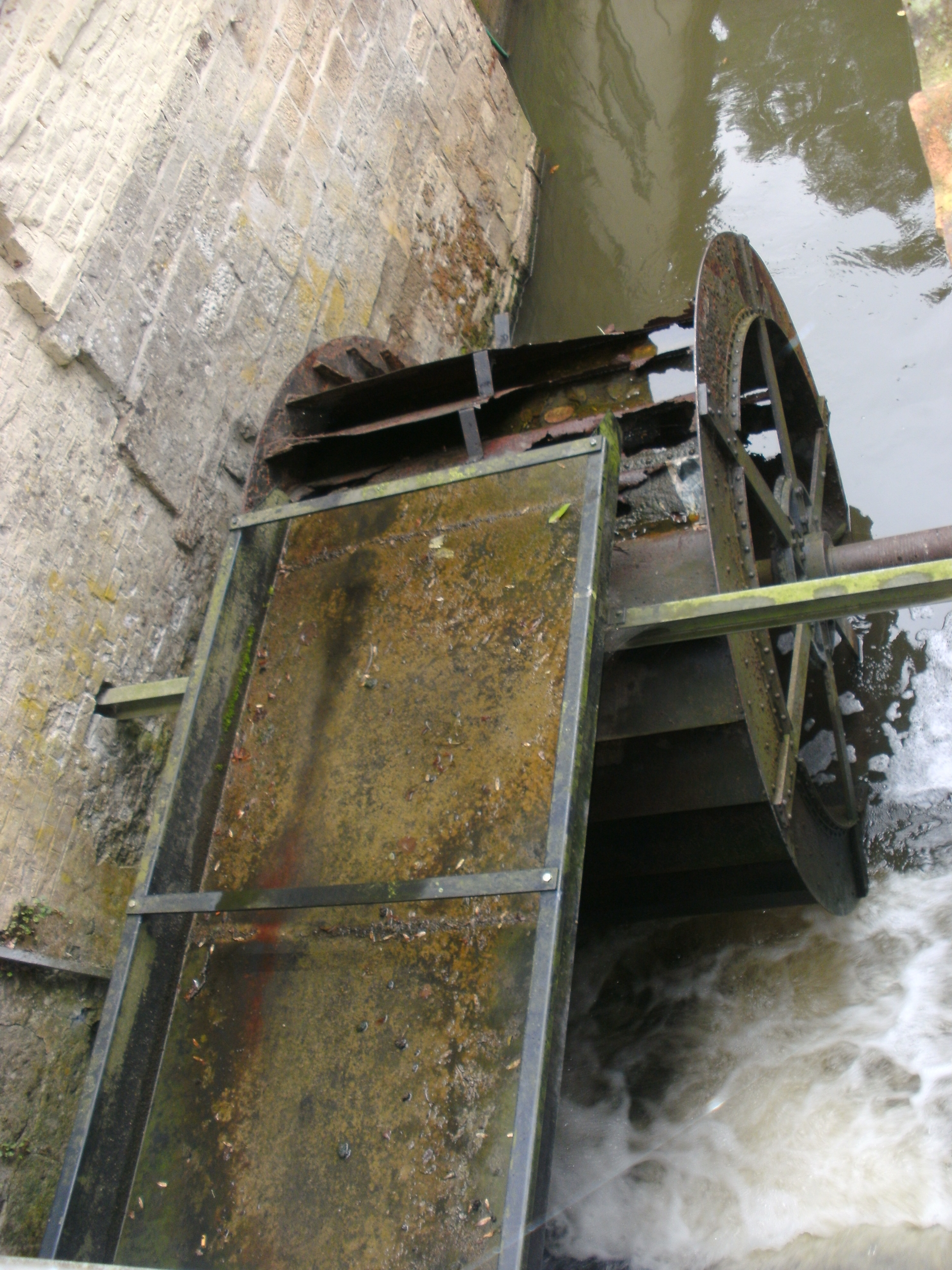
Mill wheel of the Cottemmolen at Erpe

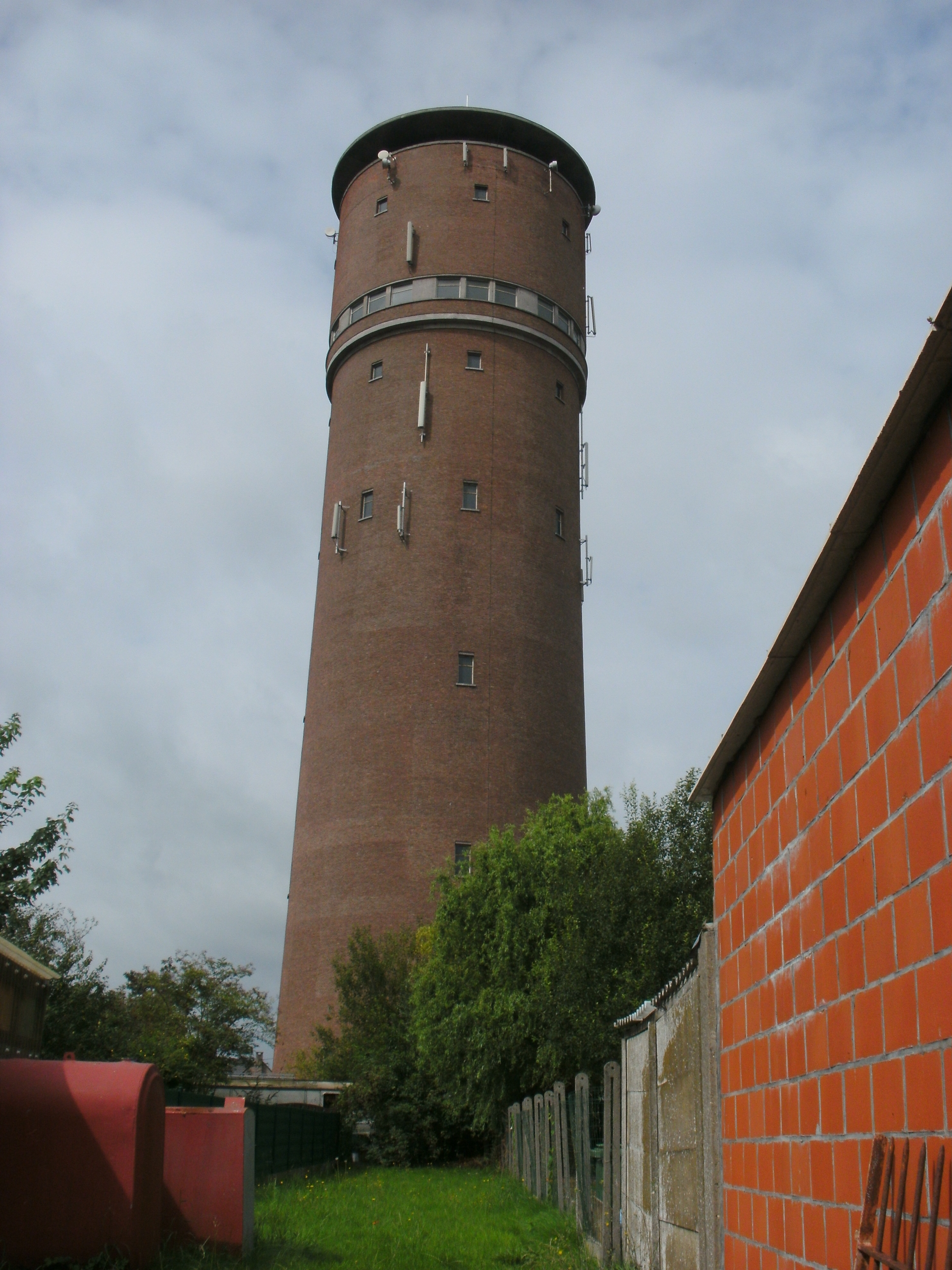
Water tower at Erpe

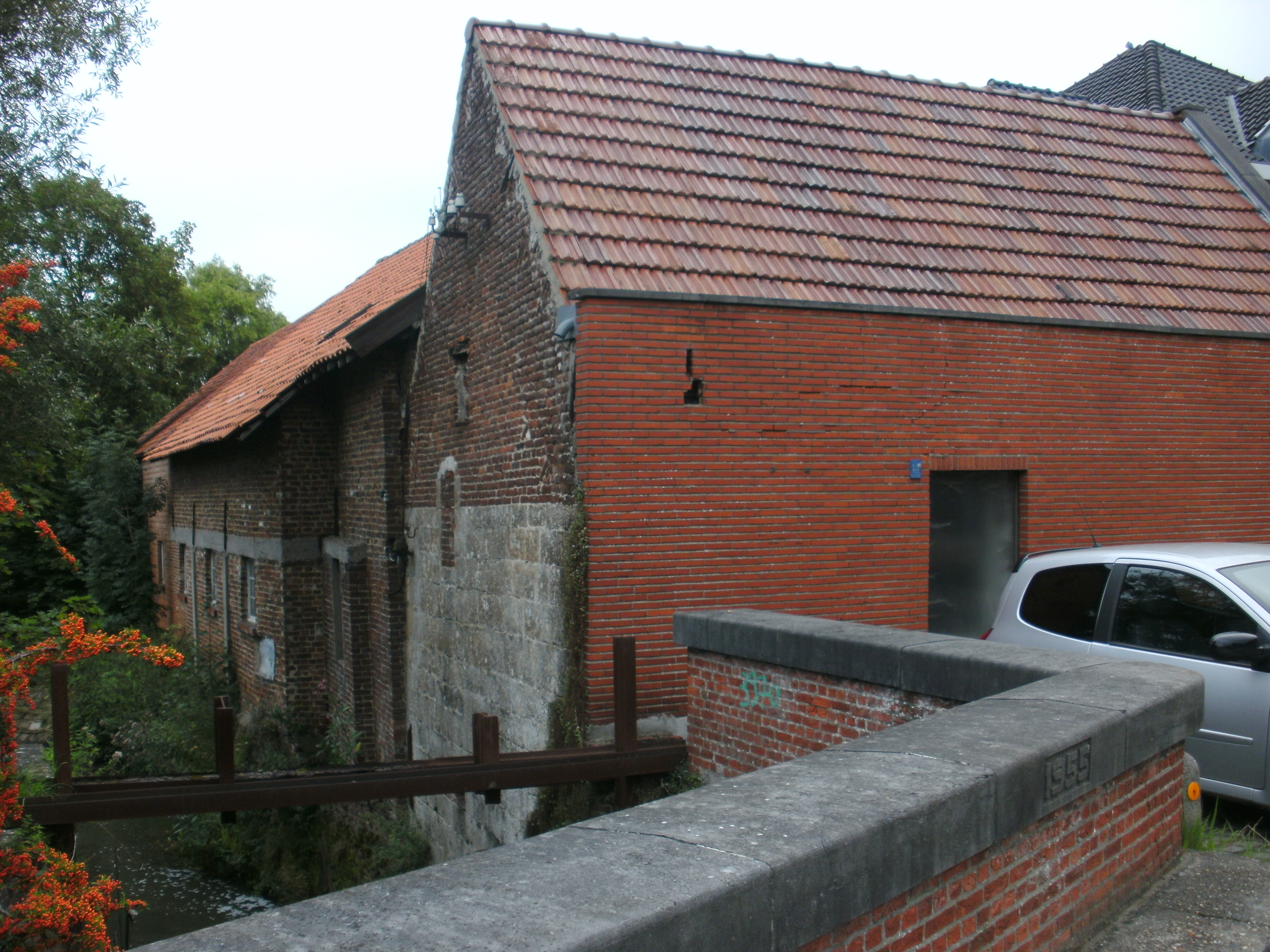
Van Der Biestmolen at Erpe

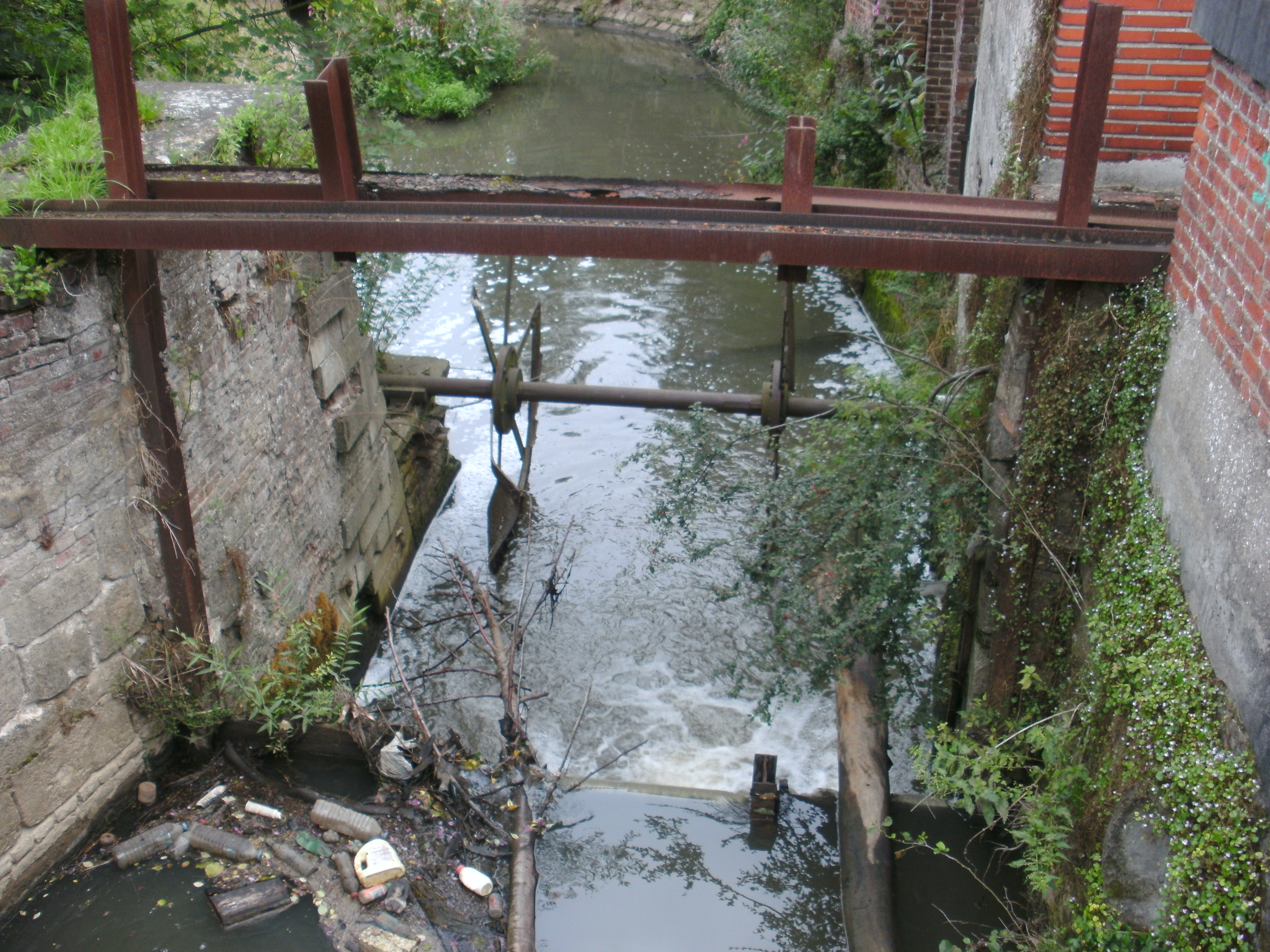
Mill wheel of the Van Der Biestmolen at Erpe

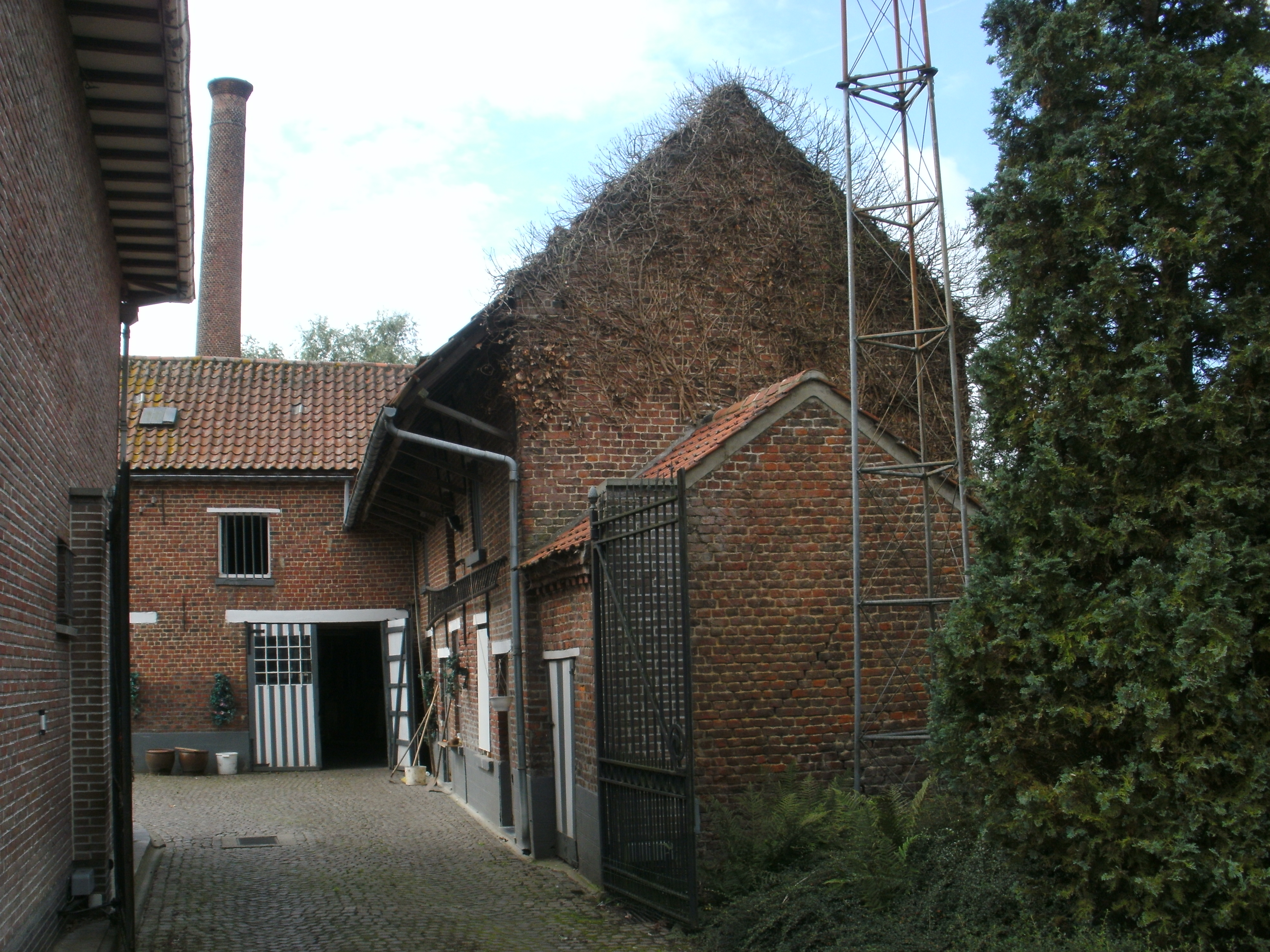
Front view of the De Graevesmolen at Mere

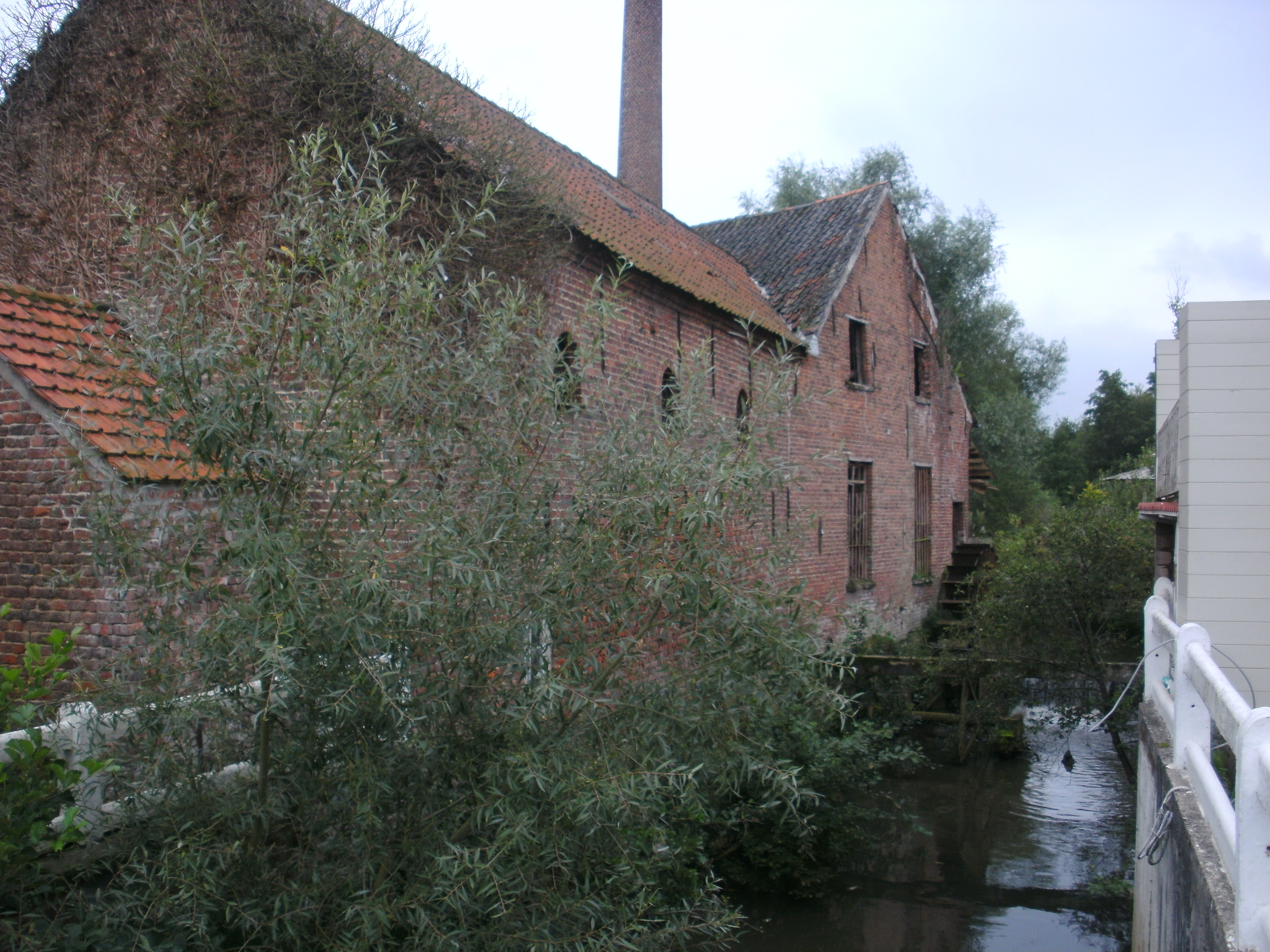
Side-view of the De Graevesmolen at Mere

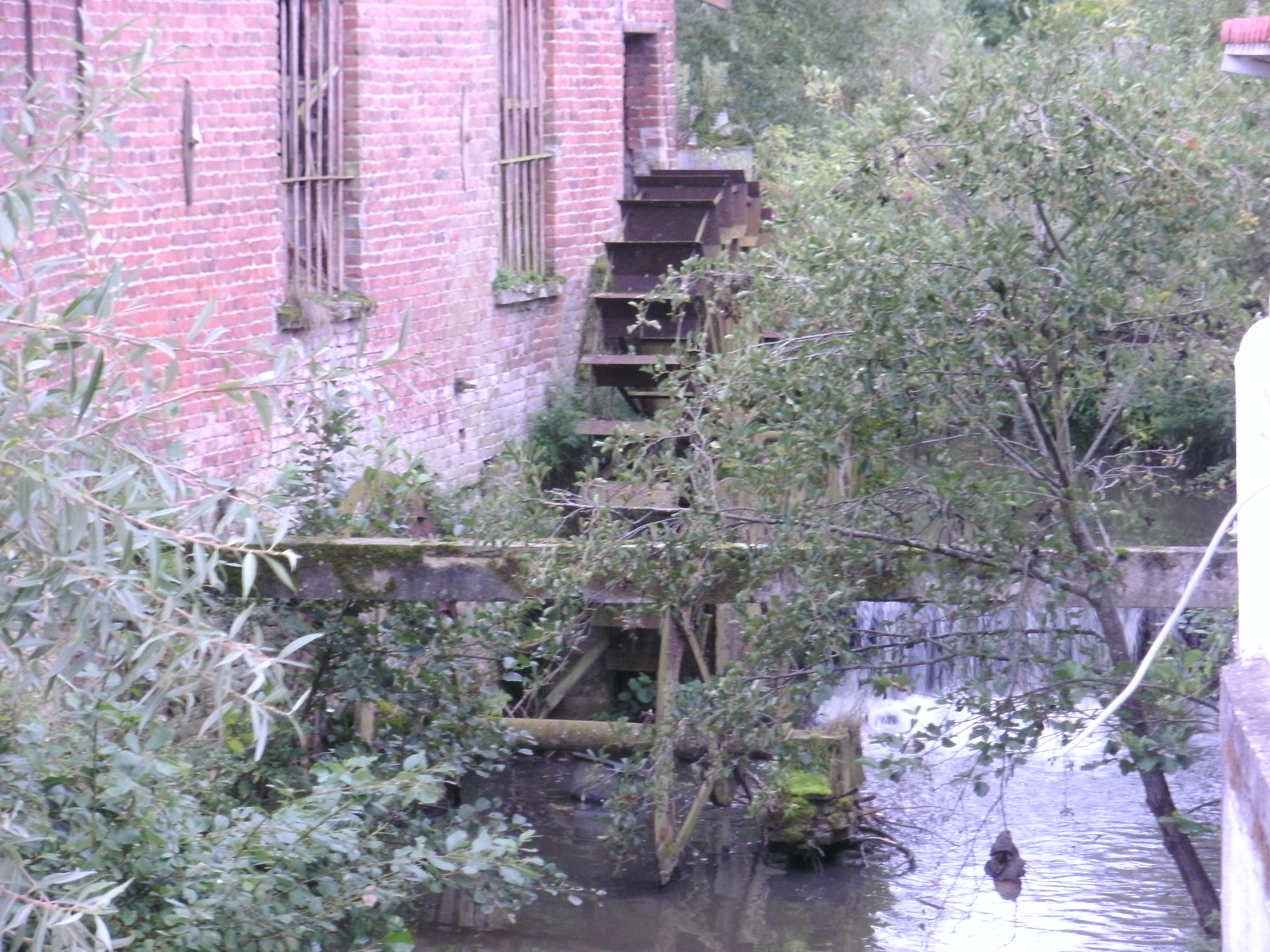
Mill wheel of the De Graevesmolen at Mere

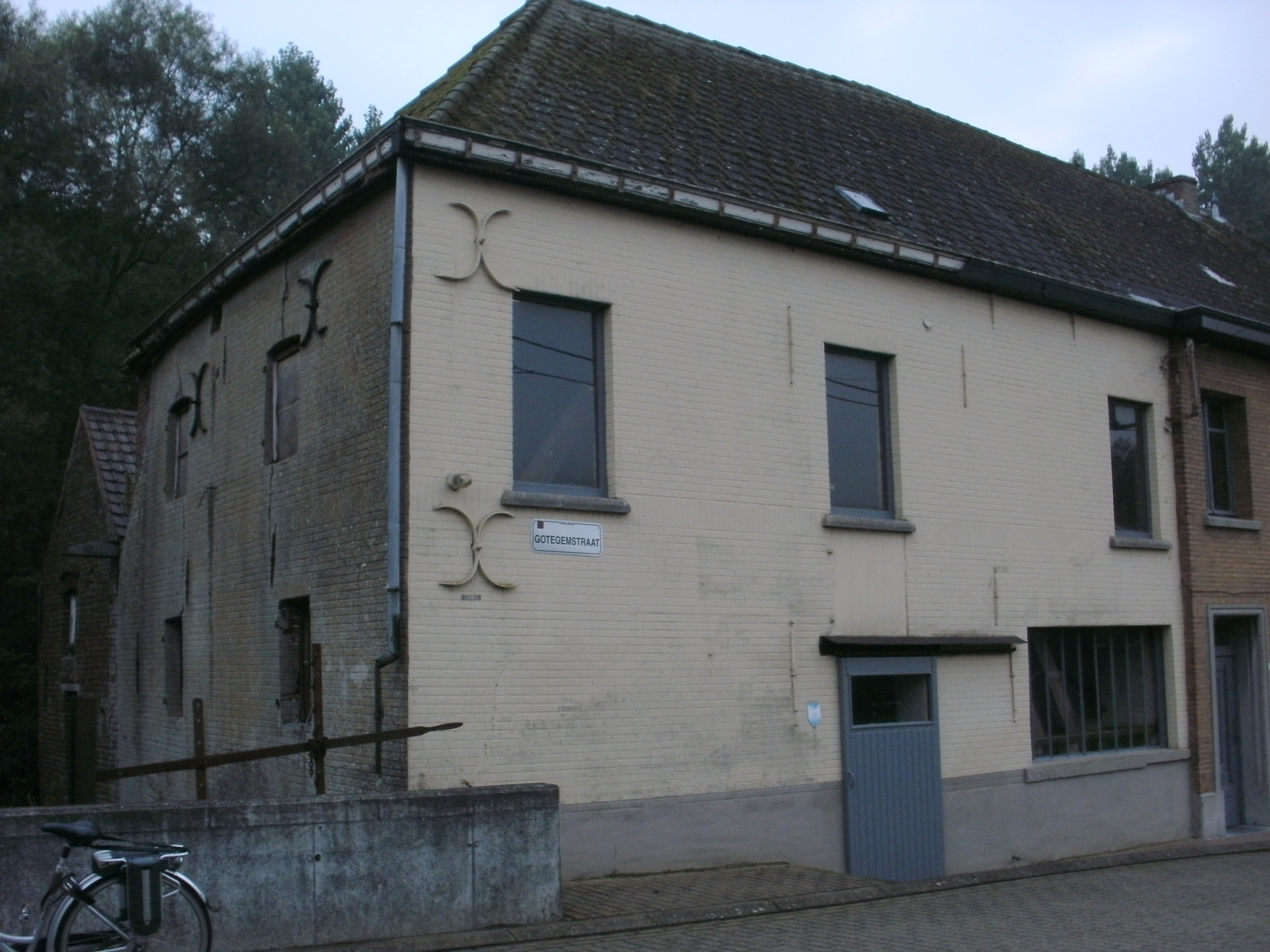
Gotegemmolen at Mere

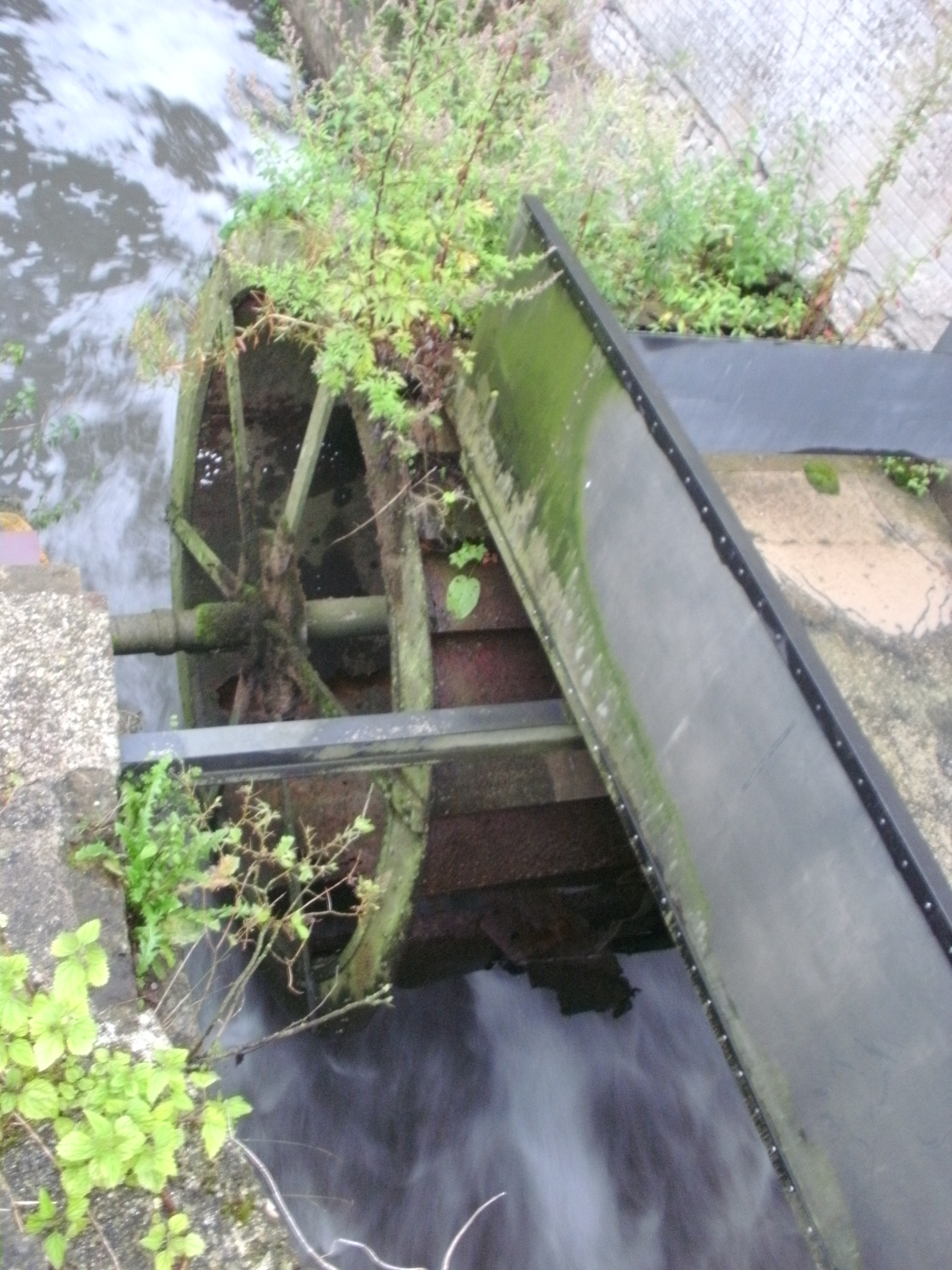
Mill wheel of the Gotegemmolen at Mere

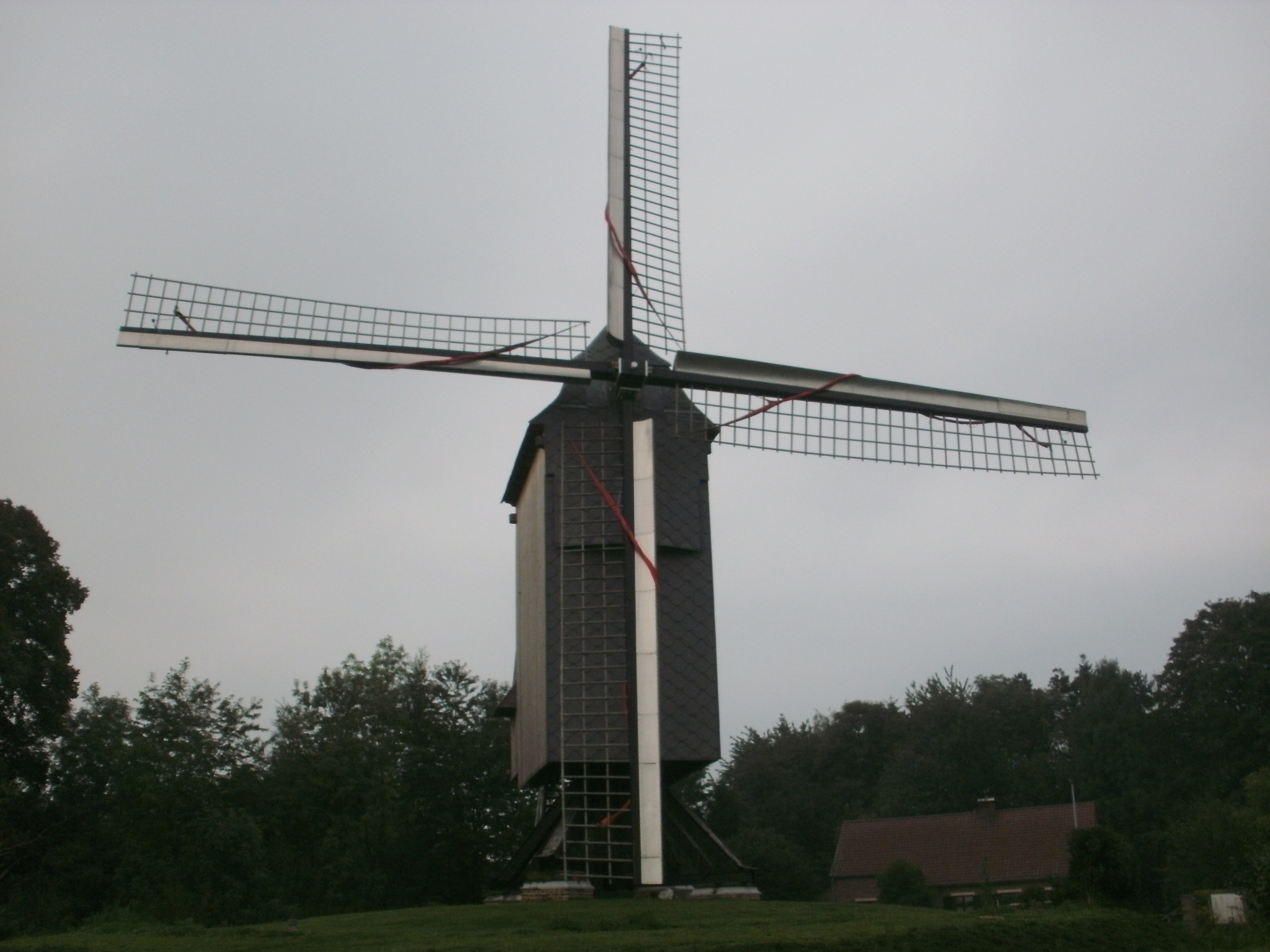
Kruiskoutermolen at Mere

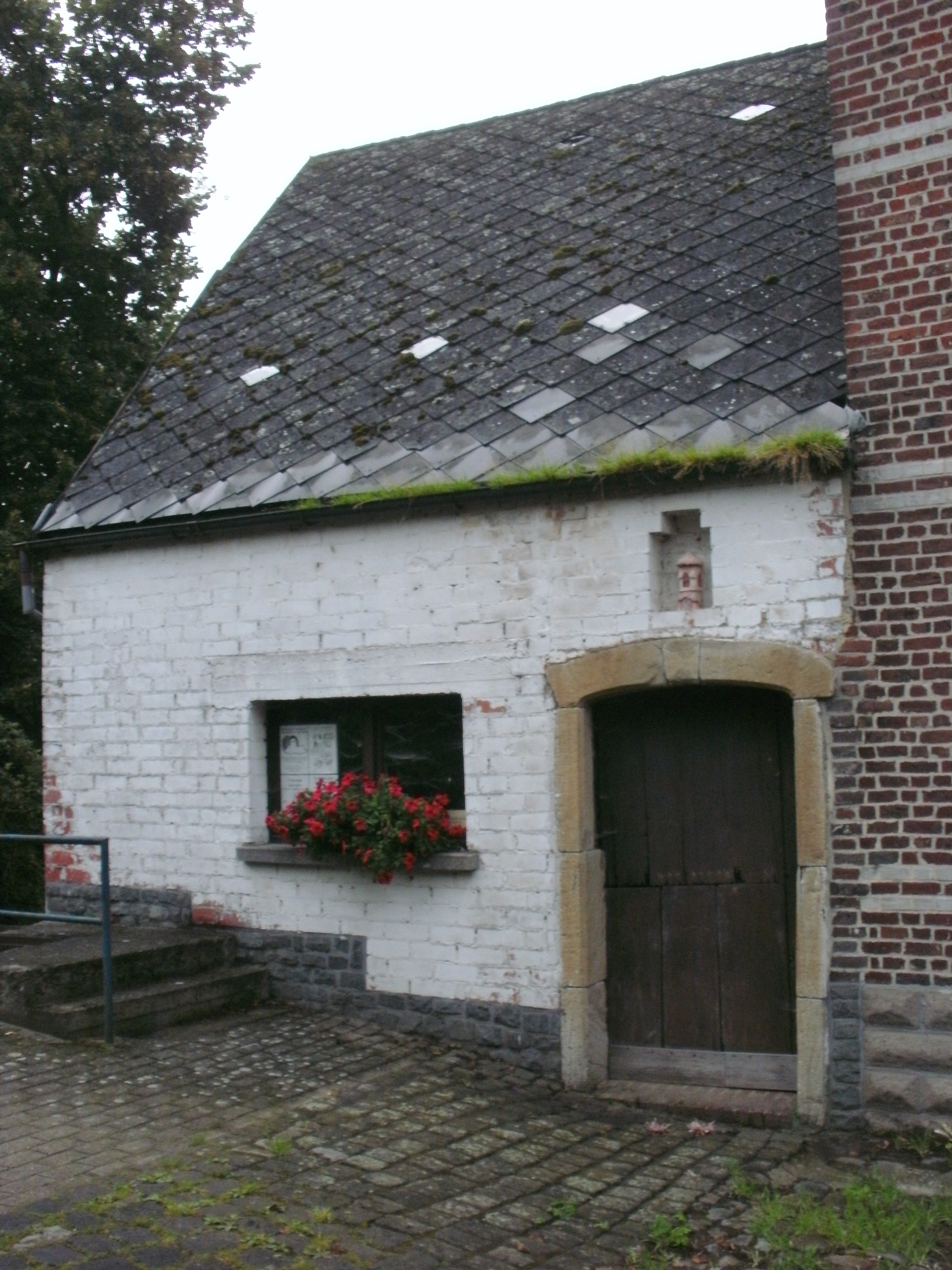
Molen te Broeck at Mere

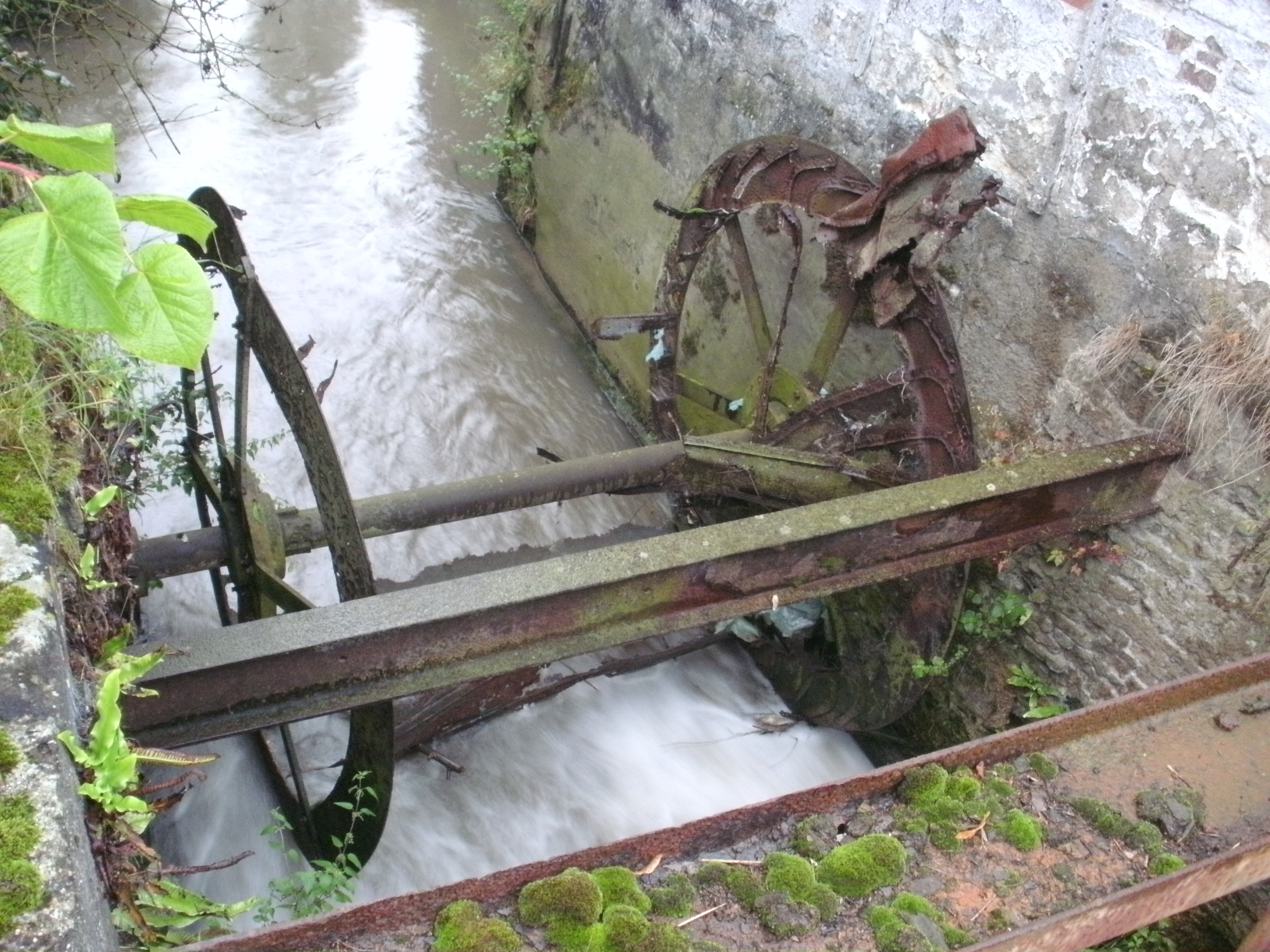
Mill wheel of the Molen te Broeck at Mere
