= KFC Olympic Burst =

Defunct Belgian football club

Olympic Burst
- Full name: Koninklijke Football Club Olympic Burst
- Founded: 20 August 1943
- Dissolved: 2021
- Ground: Oudendijk, Burst
- Final season; 2020–21: Second Provincial East Flanders (dissolved)
Home colours

Koninklijke Football Club Olympic Burst, often KFCO Burst, was a Belgian football club based in Burst, a village in the municipality of Erpe-Mere in East Flanders. The club played in the provincial leagues of East Flanders under matricule 3901 of the Royal Belgian Football Association (KBVB). Its colours were black and blue, and it played its home matches at the Oudendijk ground. Founded in 1943, the club ceased activities at the end of 2021, and its matricule was transferred to Olsa Brakel.

== History ==
The club was founded on 20 August 1943 and joined the Royal Belgian Football Association under matricule 3901. Olympic Burst spent its entire existence in the provincial leagues of East Flanders, never rising above the Second Provincial. The most significant developments in the club's history took place off the pitch: in 1984 it moved to its long-term ground at the Oudendijk in Burst, and in 1993, on its 50th anniversary, it was granted the royal title (becoming Koninklijke FC Olympic Burst, abbreviated KFCO).

After a brief promotion to Second Provincial earlier in the 2000s, the club returned to Third Provincial. It won Third Provincial D in 2009–10, regaining a place in Second Provincial; after two seasons it was relegated again in 2011–12.

=== Merger talks and dissolution ===
From the early 2010s, plans were discussed to merge the four remaining football clubs in Erpe-Mere—KRC Bambrugge, FC Mere, SK Aaigem, and KFC Olympic Burst—into a single town team. The merger eventually took place in stages: Erpe-Mere United was formed in 2021 from Bambrugge and FC Mere, with Olympic Burst and SK Aaigem expected to follow in a second phase. Olympic Burst ultimately withdrew from the project, and the club's board resolved at the end of 2021 to cease all activities. The matricule was transferred to Olsa Brakel; the final competitive football at the Oudendijk took place in May 2022.

== Notable players ==
- Hannes Van der Bruggen — the Belgium U21 international and 2014–15 Belgian First Division A champion with KAA Gent, born in Burst in 1993, played his earliest youth football at Olympic Burst from 1999 to 2003.
