= Burst switching =

Technique in packet-switched networks

In a packet switched network, burst switching is a capability in which each network switch extracts routing instructions from an incoming packet header to establish and maintain the appropriate switch connection for the duration of the packet, following which the connection is automatically released.

In concept, burst switching is similar to connectionless mode transmission, but differs in that burst switching implies an intent to establish the switch connection in near real time, so that only minimum buffering is required at the node switch.

A variant of burst switching used in optical networks is optical burst switching.

== Applications ==
Examples of technology using burst switching include:

- EtherLoop, used after the late-1990s to facilitate telephone company offerings to compete with the high-speed local data access that was then beginning to be offered by cable TV providers as an internet service offering.
- Intra-vehicle communication: Tesla Cybertruck in 2023 began using a gigabit Ethernet loop with burst switching for near real-time, redundant control of all motor vehicle subsystems, including steer-by-wire, motor controls, all vehicle controllers, plus vehicle audio with active road-noise cancellation.
