= Burst mode =

Burst mode may refer to:

== Science and technology ==
- Burst mode (computing), a data transmission mode
- Burst mode (weapon), a firing mode
- Burst mode (photography), a camera mode
- Bursting or burst mode, a mode in neurons

== Other uses ==
- Burst mode, a type of creature in Digimon Data Squad in the Digimon fictional universe
