= Bridge tap =

Method of telephone line cabling

Bridged tap or bridge tap is a long-used method of cabling for telephone lines. One cable pair (of wires) will "appear" in several different terminal locations (poles or pedestals). This allows the telephone company to use or "assign" that pair to any subscriber near those terminal locations. Once that customer disconnects, that pair becomes usable at any of the terminals. In the days of party lines, 2, 4, 6, or 8 users were commonly connected on the same pair which appeared at several different locations.

A bridge tap has no hybrid coil or other impedance matching components, just a “T” (or branch) in the cable. Thus the bridge presents an impedance mismatch. The unused branch of the T is usually left with no device connected to its end, thus has no electrical termination. Both the tap and its unterminated branch cause unwanted signal reflections, also called echoes.

Digital subscriber lines (DSL) can be affected by a bridged tap, depending on where the tap is bridged. DSL signals reflect from the discontinuities, sending the signal back through the cable pair, much like a tennis ball against a brick wall. The echoed signal is now out of phase and mixed with the original, creating, among other impairments, attenuation distortion. The modem receives both signals, gets confused and "takes errors" or cannot sync. If the bridged tap is long, the signal bounces back only in very attenuated form. Therefore, the modem will ignore the weaker signal and show no problem.

Line in bridge tap technology can be much less performing caused to the high attenuation added and to the length of the cable itself.

Bridged tap technology does not add latency. But it affects the performance of the line in general, it affects the bandwidth a lot.

A bridge tap can also be referred to as a "multiple" or a telephone pair "in multiple".
