= Herzele =

- Municipality
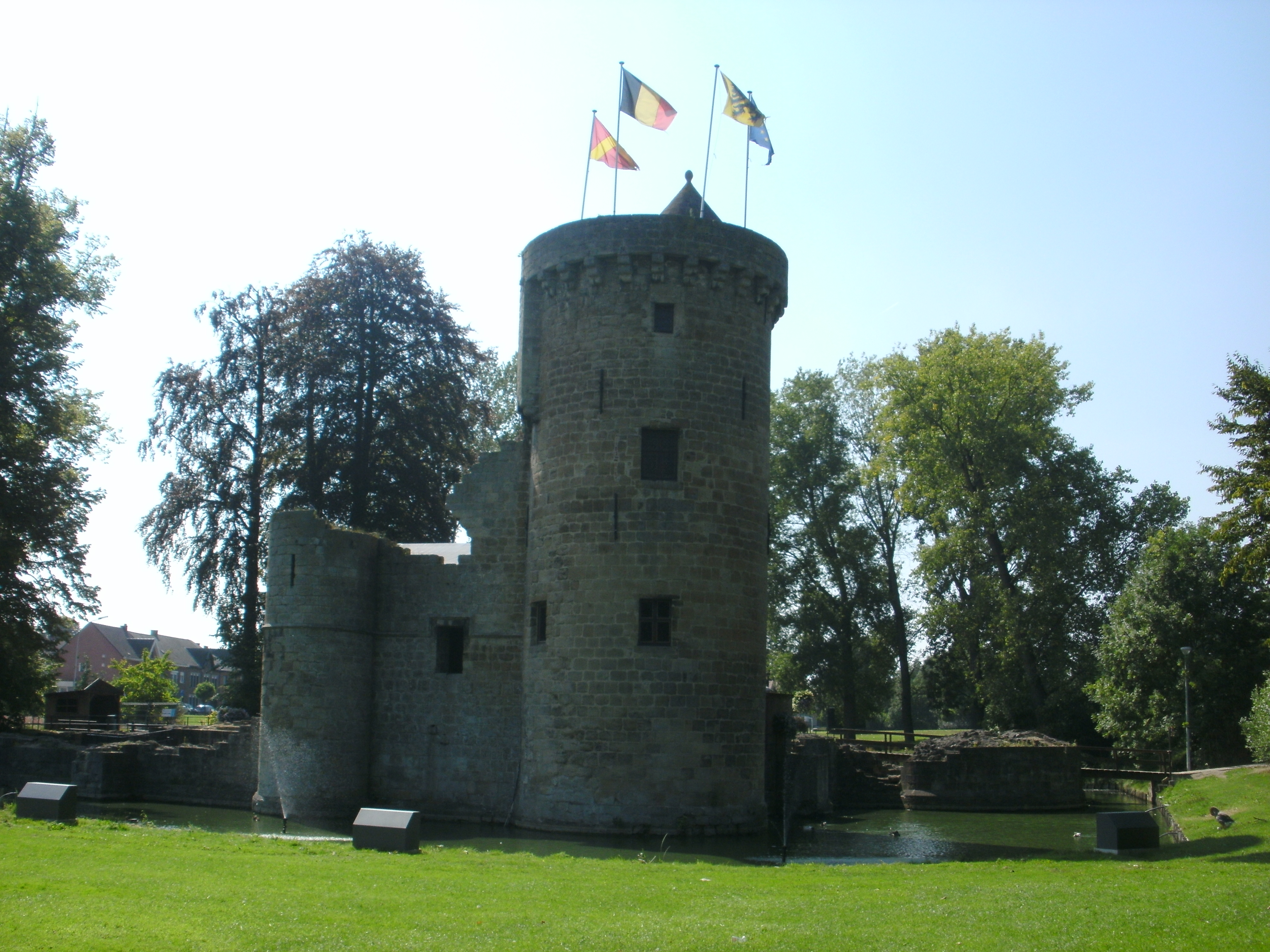
- Herzele Castle

- Flag Coat of arms

- Location of Herzele in East Flanders
- Interactive map of Herzele
- Location in Belgium
- Coordinates: 50°53′N 03°53′E
- Country: Belgium
- Community: Flemish Community
- Region: Flemish Region
- Province: East Flanders
- Arrondissement: Aalst

Government
  - Mayor: Johan Van Tittelboom (Open Vld)
  - Governing parties: Open Vld, CD&V en Partners

Area
  - Total: 47.9 km^{2} (18.5 sq mi)

Population (2018-01-01)
  - Total: 17,723
  - Density: 370/km^{2} (958/sq mi)
- Postal codes: 9550-9552
- NIS code: 41027
- Area codes: 053, 054, 09
- Website: www.herzele.be

Herzele (Dutch pronunciation: [ˈɦɛrzeːlə]) is a municipality located in the Belgian province of East Flanders in the Denderstreek. The municipality comprises the villages of Borsbeke, Herzele proper, Hillegem, Ressegem, Sint-Antelinks, Sint-Lievens-Esse, Steenhuize-Wijnhuize and Woubrechtegem. In 2021, Herzele had a total population of 18,414. The total area is 47.40 km^{2}. The current mayor of Herzele is Johan Van Tittelboom, from the Open Flemish Liberals and Democrats party.

Herzele is crossed by two brooks, the Molenbeek in Borsbeke, Herzele, Ressegem, and Hillegem, as well as the Molenbeek-Ter Erpenbeek in Herzele, Sint-Lievens-Esse, Woubrechtegem, and Ressegem.

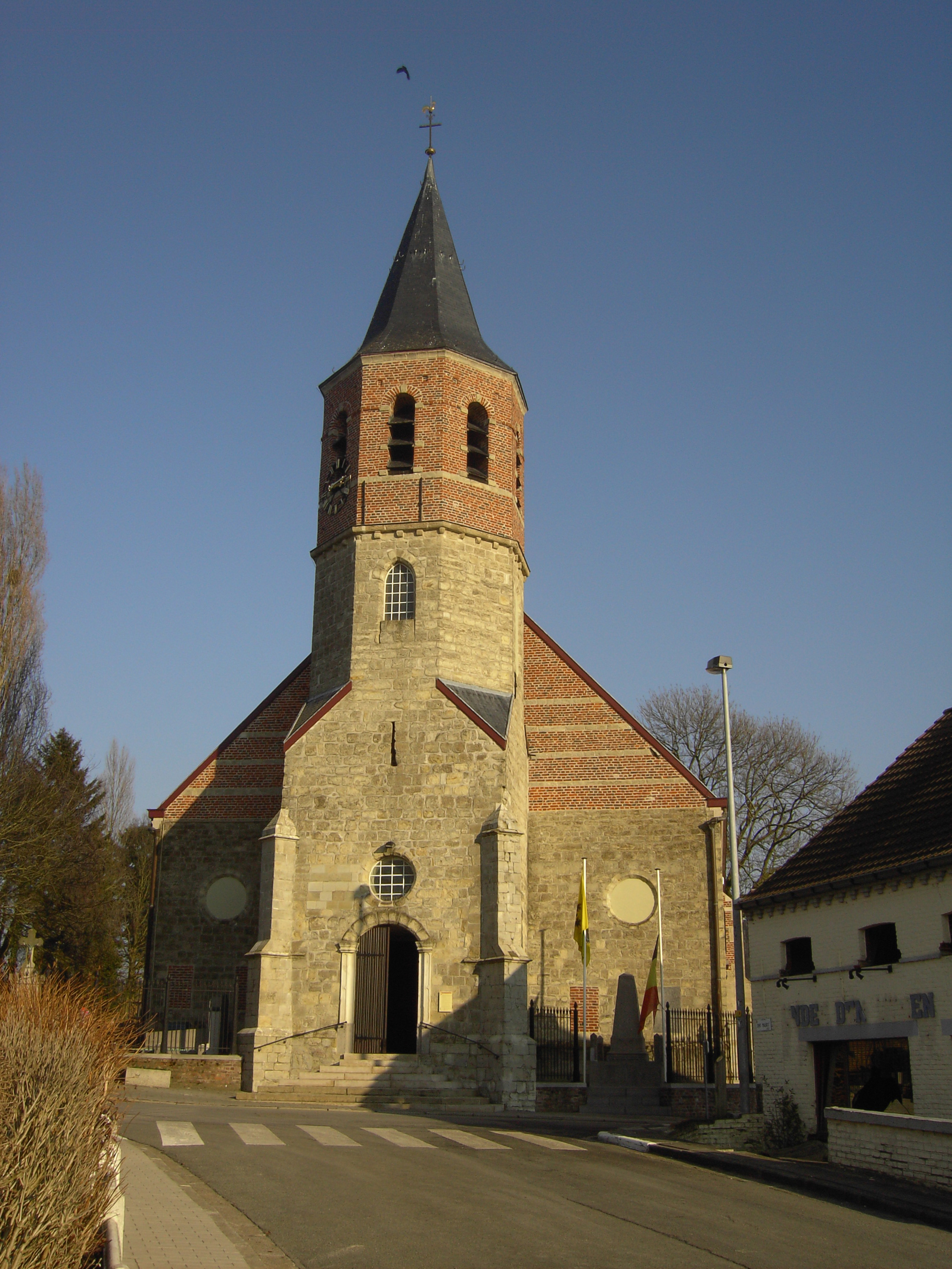
Church of Ressegem
