= Time slicing (digital broadcasting) =

Transmission technique

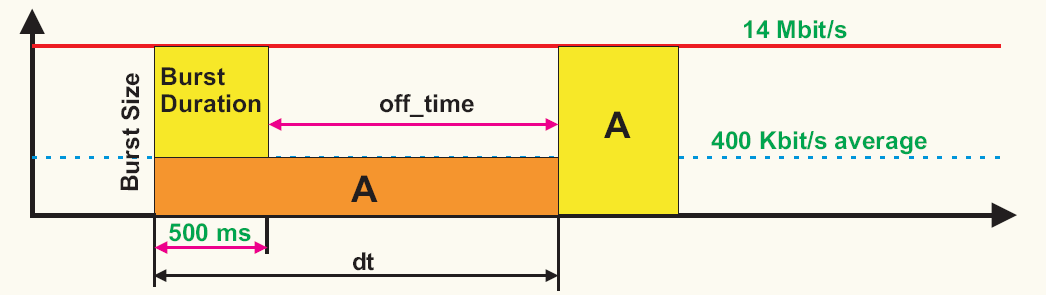
Example of a time-sliced transmission

Time slicing is a technique used by the DVB-H and ATSC-M/H technologies for achieving power-savings on mobile terminal devices. It is based on the time-multiplexed transmission of different services.

DVB-H and ATSC-M/H transmit large pieces of data in bursts, allowing the receiver to be switched off in inactive periods. The result is power savings of up to 90% - and the same inactive receiver could be used to monitor neighboring cells for seamless handovers.

== Detailed description ==
=== Motivation ===
A special problem for mobile terminals is the limited battery capacity. In a way, being compatible with a broadband terrestrial service would place a burden on the mobile terminal, because demodulating and decoding a high data-rate stream involves certain power dissipation in the tuner and the demodulator. An investigation at the beginning of the development of DVB-H showed that the total power consumption of a DVB-T front end was more than 1 Watt at the time of the examination and was expected not to decrease below 600 mW until 2006; meanwhile a somewhat lower value seems possible but the envisaged target of 100 mW as a maximum threshold for the entire front end incorporated in a DVB-H terminal is still unobtainable for a DVB-T receiver.

A considerable drawback for battery-operated terminals is the fact that with DVB-T or ATSC, the whole data stream has to be decoded before any one of the services (TV programmes) of the multiplex can be accessed. The power saving made possible by time slicing is derived from the fact that essentially only those parts of the stream which carry the data of the service currently selected have to be processed. However, the data stream needs to be reorganized in a suitable way for that purpose. In DVB-H and ATSC-M/H, service multiplexing is performed in a pure time-division multiplex. The data of one particular service are therefore not transmitted continuously but in compact periodical bursts with interruptions in between. Multiplexing of several services leads again to a continuous, uninterrupted transmitted stream of constant data-rate.

=== Burst transmission ===
This kind of signal can be received time-selectively: the terminal synchronizes to the bursts of the wanted service but switches to a power-save mode during the intermediate time when other services are being transmitted. The power-save time between bursts, relative to the on-time required for the reception of an individual service, is a direct measure of the power saving provided by time slicing. Bursts entering the receiver have to be buffered and read out of the buffer at the service data-rate. The amount of data contained in one burst needs to be sufficient for bridging the power-save period of the front end. For tuning into a stream, a burst needs to carry a video frame that allows the decoder to display the video instantaneously, otherwise, the next burst has to be awaited.

The position of the bursts is signaled in terms of the relative time difference between two consecutive bursts of the same service. This information is called "delta t". It is transmitted multiple times within a single burst as to provide error redundancy.

Practically, the duration of one burst is in the range of several hundred milliseconds whereas the power-save time may amount to several seconds. A lead time for powering up the front end, for resynchronization, etc. has to be taken into account; this time period is assumed to be less than 250 ms according to the DVB-H technical standard. Depending on the ratio of on-time / power-save time, the resulting power saving may be more than 90%.

As an example, the figure on the right shows a portion of a data stream containing time-sliced services. One quarter of the assumed total capacity of a DVB-T channel of 13.27 Mbit/s is assigned to DVB-H services whereas the remaining capacity is shared between ordinary DVB-T services. This example shows that it is feasible to transmit both DVB-T and DVB-H within the same network.

=== Calculating burst parameters ===
The length of a burst $T_{B}$ can be calculated through the size of the burst $B_B$ and the bitrate of the burst $R_B$. An additional factor of 0.96 is introduced to compensate for the headers of the underlying MPEG transport stream, because they are created after applying Time Slicing.

$T_B = \frac{B_B}{R_B \cdot 0.96}$

The actual on time of a burst, referred to as $T_{ON}$, incorporates the synchronization time stated above (250ms).

$T_{ON} = T_B + T_{Sync}$

The constant bitrate of a stream $R_C$ can be calculated from the burst bitrate and the ON and OFF lengths:

$R_C = \frac{R_B}{T_{ON}+T_{OFF}}$

Vice versa, the OFF time that is to be used can be calculated from the actual constant bitrate of the video stream. This is more intuitive, since the constant (or average) video bitrate is known before applying time slicing.

$T_{OFF} = \frac{R_B}{R_C}-T_{ON}$

The energy saving percentage $P$ can be finally expressed by

$P = (1 - R_C \cdot (\frac{1}{R_B \cdot 0.96}+\frac{T_{Sync}}{B_B})) \cdot 100 \%$

=== Benefits and Disadvantages ===
Time slicing requires a sufficiently high number of multiplexed services and a certain minimum burst data-rate to guarantee effective power saving. Basically, the power consumption of the front end correlates with the service data-rate of the service currently selected.

Time slicing offers another benefit for the terminal architecture. The rather long power-save periods may be used to search for channels in neighboring radio cells offering the selected service. This way a channel handover can be performed at the border between two cells which remains imperceptible for the user. Both the monitoring of the services in adjacent cells and the reception of the selected service data can be done with the same front end.
