= 2020–21 KAA Gent season =

KAA Gent
2020–21 season
- Chairman: Ivan De Witte
- Managing director: Michel Louwagie
- Manager: Jess Thorup (until 20 August); László Bölöni (from 20 August until 14 September); Wim De Decker (from 14 September until 3 December); Hein Vanhaezebrouck (from 4 December)
- Stadium: Ghelamco Arena
- Belgian First Division A: 7th
- Belgian Cup: Quarter-finals
- UEFA Champions League: Play-off round
- UEFA Europa League: Group stage
- Top goalscorer: League: Roman Yaremchuk (20); All: Roman Yaremchuk (23)
Home colours	Away colours	Third colours
- All statistics correct as of 22 May 2021.

The 2020–21 KAA Gent season was the club's 118th season in existence and the 32nd consecutive season in the top flight of Belgian football. In addition to the domestic league, Gent participated in this season's editions of the Belgian Cup, the UEFA Champions League, and the UEFA Europa League. The season covered the period from 1 July 2020 to 30 June 2021.

== Players ==
=== First-team squad ===
As of 27 February 2021

Note: Flags indicate national team as defined under FIFA eligibility rules; some limited exceptions apply. Players may hold more than one non-FIFA nationality.

No.	Pos.	Nation	Player
1	GK	TUR	Sinan Bolat
5	DF	CMR	Michael Ngadeu-Ngadjui
6	MF	FRA	Elisha Owusu
7	FW	UKR	Roman Yaremchuk
8	MF	BEL	Vadis Odjidja-Ofoe (captain)
9	MF	UKR	Roman Bezus
10	MF	GEO	Giorgi Chakvetadze
11	FW	CIV	Anderson Niangbo
12	MF	BEL	Alexandre De Bruyn
14	DF	BEL	Alessio Castro-Montes
15	DF	IRI	Milad Mohammadi
18	FW	BEL	Dylan Mbayo
20	FW	GHA	Osman Bukari
21	DF	NOR	Andreas Hanche-Olsen

No.	Pos.	Nation	Player
22	MF	GAM	Sulayman Marreh
23	FW	ISR	Yonas Malede
24	MF	BEL	Sven Kums (vice-captain)
25	DF	ANG	Núrio Fortuna
26	GK	BEL	Colin Coosemans
27	MF	BEL	Mathéo Parmentier
28	MF	BEL	Wouter George
29	FW	BEL	Laurent Depoitre
30	MF	GER	Niklas Dorsch
31	DF	BEL	Bruno Godeau
32	DF	UKR	Ihor Plastun
33	GK	BEL	Davy Roef
36	DF	BEL	Dino Arslanagić
—	FW	MAR	Tarik Tissoudali

==== Out on loan ====
Note: Flags indicate national team as defined under FIFA eligibility rules; some limited exceptions apply. Players may hold more than one non-FIFA nationality.

No.	Pos.	Nation	Player
17	DF	COD	Jordan Botaka (at R. Charleroi S.C.)
13	FW	GEO	Giorgi Kvilitaia (at Anorthosis Famagusta FC)
19	MF	BEL	Brecht Dejaegere (at Toulouse FC)

No.	Pos.	Nation	Player
–	MF	CRO	Franko Andrijašević (at HNK Rijeka)
–	MF	SWE	Eric Smith (at FC St. Pauli)
34	FW	GER	Tim Kleindienst (at 1. FC Heidenheim)

== Transfers ==
=== In ===
No.	Pos	Player	Transferred from	Fee	Date	Source

=== Out ===
No.	Pos	Player	Transferred to	Fee	Date	Source
16	FW	(Canada) Jonathan David	(France) Lille	€30,000,000	11 August 2020	
1	GK	(Belgium) Thomas Kaminski	(England) Blackburn Rovers	€500,000	26 August 2020	

== Pre-season and friendlies ==
Win Draw Loss Fixtures

18 July 2020 Friendly	Club Brugge (Belgium)	2–3	(Belgium) Gent	Knokke-Heist, Belgium
18:00 CEST (UTC+2)		Report		Stadium: Complex Molenhoek

21 July 2020 Friendly	Lens (France)	1–1	(Belgium) Gent	Billy-Montigny, France
16:00 CEST (UTC+2)	Sotoca 18' (pen.)		Botaka 30' (pen.)	Stadium: Stade Paul Guerre

22 July 2020 Friendly	Gent (Belgium)	2–3	(France) Lyon	Ghent, Belgium
19:45 CEST (UTC+2)	Niangbo 34'; Plastun (yellow card) 37'; De Bruyn 74' (pen.)	Report	Toko Ekambi 21'; Traoré 42'; Bard 49'	Stadium: Ghelamco Arena

28 July 2020 Friendly	Gent (Belgium)	3–0	(France) Metz	Ghent, Belgium
17:00 CEST (UTC+2)	Yaremchuk 13', 21'; Plastun 64'	Report		Stadium: Ghelamco Arena

1 August 2020 Friendly	Zulte Waregem (Belgium)	2–1	(Belgium) Gent	Waregem, Belgium
18:00 CEST (UTC+2)	Berahino 1'; Vossen 6'; Srarfi (red card) 31'	Report	Yaremchuk 53'; Odjidja-Ofoe (red card) 66'	Stadium: Regenboogstadion

5 August 2020 Friendly	Gent (Belgium)	2–1	(Belgium) RFC Seraing	Ghent, Belgium
11:00 CEST (UTC+2)	Mahour 78'; Parmentier 88'	Report	Mikautadze 44'	Stadium: PGB-Stadion

3 September 2020 Friendly	AZ (Netherlands)	1–1	(Belgium) Gent	Alkmaar, Netherlands
16:30 CEST (UTC+2)	Sugawara 76'	Report	Ngadeu-Ngadjui 51'	Stadium: AFAS Stadion; Attendance: 0 Referee: Thomas Hardeman

22 March 2021 Friendly	Gent (Belgium)	0–0	(Belgium) Anderlecht	Ghent, Belgium
12:00 CET (UTC+1)		Report		Stadium: PGB-Stadion

26 March 2021 Friendly	Oostende (Belgium)	1–4	(Belgium) Gent	Ostend, Belgium
11:30 CET (UTC+1)	10' (o.g.)	Report	Bezus 29' (pen.); Tanghe 31' (o.g.); Malede 72'; Tissoudali 76'	Stadium: Versluys Arena

== Competitions ==
=== Overview ===
Competition	First match	Last match	Starting round	Final position	Record							
Competition	First match	Last match	Starting round	Final position	Pld	W	D	L	GF	GA	GD	Win %
Belgian First Division A	9 August 2020	22 May 2021	Matchday 1	7th	40	18	8	14	68	48	+20	45.00
Belgian Cup	3 February 2021	3 March 2021	Sixth round	Quarter-finals	3	2	0	1	8	2	+6	66.67
UEFA Champions League	15 September 2020	29 September 2020	Third qualifying round	Play-off round	3	1	0	2	3	6	−3	33.33
UEFA Europa League	22 October 2020	10 December 2020	Group stage	Group stage	6	0	0	6	4	15	−11	0.00
Total					52	21	8	23	83	71	+12	40.38

Last updated: 22 May 2021
Source: Soccerway

=== Belgian First Division A ===
==== Regular season ====
Pos	Team	Pld	W	D	L	GF	GA	GD	Pts	Qualification or relegation
5	Oostende (Note: On 14 April 2021 news was released that both Excel Mouscron and Oostende had not received a Belgian professional football license for the coming season, a requirement to play at the top two levels of Belgian football. For Oostende, a lack of financial transparency, together with generally poor quality and incompleteness of the submitted report, was given as the main reason by the committee for not awarding a license, while Excel Mouscron was refused a license as besides insufficient transparency, the committee also questioned several cash flows and whether the club was creditworthy in general, also due to the fact that the wages for the months of February and March had not yet been paid at that point. For Excel Mouscron, it was already the sixth year running the license was (initially) refused, however, the club has appealed the decision with the Belgian Court for Sports Arbitrage (BAS) successfully on each occasion and intended to do so again. Oostende was planning to launch an appeal as well, with the BAS to rule on the matter for both clubs before the 10th of May. Both clubs were allowed to add new documents to their case, but in case they however still did not receive a license after appeal, knew they would have been forced to relegate to the 2021–22 Belgian Division 2 and start the season with a 3-point penalty. Both Excel Mouscron and Oostende were however eventually awarded a license after appeal, meaning Oostende remained at the top level, while Excel Mouscron only dropped one level.)	34	15	8	11	49	41	+8	53	Qualification for the Play-offs II
6	Standard Liège	34	13	11	10	52	41	+11	50	Qualification for the Play-offs II
7	Gent	34	14	7	13	55	42	+13	49	Qualification for the Play-offs II
8	Mechelen	34	13	9	12	54	54	0	48	Qualification for the Play-offs II
9	Beerschot	34	14	5	15	58	64	−6	47	

Source: Jupiler Pro League (in Dutch), Soccerway
Rules for classification: 1) Points; 2) Matches won; 3) Goal difference; 4) Goals scored; 5) Away matches won; 6) Away goal difference; 7) Away goals scored; 8) Play-off.

==== Results summary ====
Overall								Home						Away					
Pld	W	D	L	GF	GA	GD	Pts	W	D	L	GF	GA	GD	W	D	L	GF	GA	GD
34	14	7	13	55	42	+13	49	8	3	6	29	21	+8	6	4	7	26	21	+5

Last updated: 18 April 2021.
Source: Jupiler Pro League

==== Results by round ====
Round	1	2	3	4	5	6	7	8	9	10	11	12	13	14	15	16	17	18	19	20	21	22	23	24	25	26	27	28	29	30	31	32	33	34
Ground	A	H	A	H	A	A	H	H	A	H	A	H	A	H	A	H	H	A	A	A	H	A	A	H	A	H	H	A	H	H	H	A	H	A
Result	L	L	L	W	L	W	L	W	L	L	W	D	W	L	L	W	W	W	L	D	L	D	W	D	D	D	W	D	L	W	W	L	W	W
Position1	13	16	18	14	16	13	15	12	13	13	12	12	11	12	13	12	10	8	9	11	13	13	10	11	12	12	12	12	12	11	9	10	9	7

Updated to match(es) played on 18 April 2021. Source: Jupiler Pro League
A = Away; H = Home; W = Win; D = Draw; L = Loss

==== Matches ====
The league fixtures were announced on 8 July 2020.

9 August 2020 1	Sint-Truiden	2–1	Gent	Sint-Truiden
13:30 CEST (UTC+2)	Suzuki 2'; Colombatto (yellow card) 31'; Colidio 60', (yellow card) 90'	Report	Bezus (yellow card) 30'; Plastun 43'; Owusu (yellow card) 67'	Stadium: Stayen; Attendance: 0 Referee: Jan Boterberg

15 August 2020 2	Gent	1–2	Kortrijk	Ghent
19:00 CEST (UTC+2)	Plastun 59'	Report	Moffi 22'; Makarenko (yellow card) 45+1'; Van der Bruggen 83'	Stadium: Ghelamco Arena; Attendance: 0 Referee: Nicolas Laforge

22 August 2020 3	Antwerp	1–0	Gent	Antwerp
20:45 CEST (UTC+2)	Mbokani 17'; Batubinsika (yellow card) 45'; De Pauw (yellow card) 60'	Report	Kums (yellow card) 53'	Stadium: Bosuilstadion; Attendance: 0 Referee: Jonathan Lardot

30 August 2020 4	Gent	1–0	KV Mechelen	Ghent
20:45 CEST (UTC+2)	Niangbo 36'; Chakvetadze (yellow card) 56'; Castro-Montes (yellow card) 90+4'	Report	Schoofs (yellow card) 59'	Stadium: Ghelamco Arena; Attendance: 0 Referee: Lawrence Visser

11 September 2020 5	Eupen	2–1	Gent	Eupen
20:45 CEST (UTC+2)	Prevljak 35'; Cools 53', (yellow card) 84'; Adriano (yellow card) 71'; Amat (yellow card) 78'	Report	Kums 63', (yellow card) 75'; Ngadeu-Ngadjui (red card) 73'; Botaka (yellow card) 76'; Arslanagić (yellow card) 88'	Stadium: Kehrwegstadion; Attendance: 1,038; Referee: Nathan Verboomen

19 September 2020 6	Excel Mouscron	0–1	Gent	Mouscron
18:30 CEST (UTC+2)	Agouzoul (yellow card) 24'; Ciranni (yellow card) 81'; Nlandu (yellow card) 85'	Report	Dorsch 14'	Stadium: Stade Le Canonnier; Attendance: 900; Referee: Bert Put

26 September 2020 7	Gent	2–3	OH Leuven	Ghent
20:45 CEST (UTC+2)	Dorsch (yellow card) 30', (goal) 71' (pen.); Depoitre (yellow card) 65'; Kleindienst 74' (pen.)	Report	Sowah 41', 48'; Maertens 44', (yellow card) 84'; Hubert (yellow card) 85'; Romo (yellow card) 90+6'	Stadium: Ghelamco Arena; Attendance: 8,000; Referee: Jonathan Lardot

4 October 2020 8	Gent	5–1	Beerschot	Ghent
16:00 CEST (UTC+2)	Yaremchuk 12', 15'; Depoitre 29', 61'; Marreh (yellow card) 51'; Samoise 79'	Report	Dom (yellow card) 78'; Coulibaly 90+1'	Stadium: Ghelamco Arena; Attendance: 7,995; Referee: Lothar D'hondt

17 October 2020 9	Cercle Brugge	5–2	Gent	Bruges
16:15 CEST (UTC+2)	Kanouté 4'; Hotić 31' (pen.); Ugbo 57', 78'; Marcelin 82'	Report	Hanche-Olsen 14'; Yaremchuk 64' (pen.)	Stadium: Jan Breydel Stadium; Attendance: 2,500; Referee: Nathan Verboomen

26 October 2020 10	Gent	1–2	Genk	Ghent
20:45 CET (UTC+1)	Castro-Montes 24'; Kleindienst (yellow card) 73'	Report	Bongonda 40'; Muñoz (yellow card) 58'; Uronen (yellow card) 65'; Hrošovský 84'	Stadium: Ghelamco Arena; Attendance: 0 Referee: Jan Boterberg

1 November 2020 11	Waasland-Beveren	1–4	Gent	Beveren
20:45 CET (UTC+1)	Vukčević (yellow card) 21'; Wiegel (yellow card) 27'; Vukotić (yellow card) 28'; Sinani 51'; Gamboa (yellow card) 53'	Report	Dorsch 28'; Yaremchuk 29', 37', 44'	Stadium: Freethiel Stadion; Attendance: 0 Referee: Erik Lambrechts

8 November 2020 12	Gent	1–1	Anderlecht	Ghent
18:15 CET (UTC+1)	Dorsch (yellow card) 32'; Yaremchuk (yellow card) 61', (goal) 89'; Mohammadi (yellow card) 75'	Report	Tau (yellow card) 26'; Murillo 44', (yellow card) 45+1'; Miazga (yellow card) 64'; Lawrence (yellow card) 80'	Stadium: Ghelamco Arena; Attendance: 0 Referee: Nicolas Laforge

22 November 2020 13	Charleroi	0–1	Gent	Charleroi
18:15 CET (UTC+1)	Rezaei (yellow card) 37'	Report	Ngadeu-Ngadjui (yellow card) 34'; Bukari 45'; Fortuna (yellow card) 61'	Stadium: Stade du Pays de Charleroi; Attendance: 0 Referee: Nathan Verboomen

29 November 2020 14	Gent	0–3	Zulte Waregem	Ghent
16:00 CET (UTC+1)	Ngadeu-Ngadjui (yellow card) 25'	Report	Govea 27'; Chorý 37'; De Bock (yellow card) 54'; Vossen 82'	Stadium: Ghelamco Arena; Attendance: 0 Referee: Alexandre Boucaut

6 December 2020 15	Oostende	2–1	Gent	Ostend
20:45 CET (UTC+1)	Skúlason (yellow card) 45+2'; Gueye (yellow card) 59', (goal) 61'; Sakala 73' (pen.)	Report	Bukari 5', (yellow card) 67'; Fortuna (yellow card) 89'; Ngadeu-Ngadjui (yellow card) 90+5'; Bezus (yellow card) 90+5'	Stadium: Versluys Arena; Attendance: 0 Referee: Lothar D'hondt

13 December 2020 16	Gent	2–1	Standard Liège	Ghent
18:15 CET (UTC+1)	Fortuna 27'; Yaremchuk 85'	Report	Ngadeu-Ngadjui 2' (o.g.); Cimirot (yellow card) 50'	Stadium: Ghelamco Arena; Attendance: 0 Referee: Lawrence Visser

16 December 2020 17	Gent	3–0	Waasland-Beveren	Ghent
21:00 CET (UTC+1)	Castro-Montes 25'; Yaremchuk 53'; Hanche-Olsen (yellow card) 61'; Bukari 90+1'	Report	Wiegel (yellow card) 37'; Frey (yellow card) 66'	Stadium: Ghelamco Arena; Attendance: 0 Referee: Bert Put

20 December 2020 18	Club Brugge	0–1	Gent	Bruges
13:30 CET (UTC+1)	Vanaken (yellow card) 47'; Deli (yellow card) 62'; Lang (yellow card) 83'	Report	Mohammadi (yellow card) 26'; Dorsch (yellow card) 64'; Ricca 68' (o.g.); Kleindienst (yellow card) 90+2'	Stadium: Jan Breydel Stadium; Attendance: 0 Referee: Erik Lambrechts

26 December 2020 19	Kortrijk	1–0	Gent	Kortrijk
18:30 CET (UTC+1)	De Sart (yellow card) 31'; Ocansey (yellow card) 34'; Selemani 49'; Lepoint (yellow card) 82'	Report	Yaremchuk (red card) 21'	Stadium: Guldensporen Stadion; Attendance: 0 Referee: Wim Smet

10 January 2021 20	Beerschot	1–1	Gent	Antwerp
16:00 CET (UTC+1)	Holzhauser (penalty missed) 8'; Coulibaly 23'; Frans (yellow card) 42'; Suzuki (yellow card) 49'; Vorogovskiy (yellow card) 90'; Van den Bergh (yellow card) 90+1'	Report	Bolat (yellow card) 8'; Kums 43' (pen.); Marreh (yellow card) 87'	Stadium: Olympisch Stadion; Attendance: 0 Referee: Lawrence Visser

17 January 2021 21	Gent	0–1	Antwerp	Ghent
13:30 CET (UTC+1)	Kums (penalty missed) 52'; Bukari (yellow card) 71'	Report	De Pauw (yellow card) 36'; Beiranvand (yellow card) 51'; Hongla (yellow card) 54', (goal) 75'	Stadium: Ghelamco Arena; Attendance: 0 Referee: Nathan Verboomen

21 January 2021 22	Genk	1–1	Gent	Genk
21:00 CET (UTC+1)	Onuachu 7'; Cuesta (red card) 12'; Toma (yellow card) 25'; Vukovic (yellow card) 45+6'; Ito (penalty missed) 68'	Report	Yaremchuk 45+3'; Ngadeu-Ngadjui (yellow card) 45+5'; Dorsch (yellow card) 60'; Marreh (yellow card) 83'; Depoitre (yellow card) 83'	Stadium: Luminus Arena; Attendance: 0 Referee: Nicolas Laforge

24 January 2021 23	OH Leuven	0–3	Gent	Leuven
20:45 CET (UTC+1)	Henry (yellow card) 28' (yellow-red card) 79'	Report	Mohammadi 6'; Kums (yellow card) 45', (goal) 50'; Bukari (yellow card) 46', (goal) 54'	Stadium: Den Dreef; Attendance: 0 Referee: Wesley Alen

27 January 2021 24	Gent	1–1	Sint-Truiden	Ghent
21:00 CET (UTC+1)	Castro-Montes (yellow card) 78'; Schmidt 90+5' (o.g.)	Report	Colidio 23'; Teixeira (yellow card) 72'; Sankhon (yellow card) 90+4'	Stadium: Ghelamco Arena; Attendance: 0 Referee: Christof Dierick

31 January 2021 25	Anderlecht	0–0	Gent	Anderlecht
18:15 CET (UTC+1)		Report	Arslanagić (yellow card) 60'	Stadium: Constant Vanden Stock Stadium; Attendance: 0 Referee: Erik Lambrechts

7 February 2021 26	Gent	2–2	Eupen	Ghent
20:45 CET (UTC+1)	Tissoudali 27', 30'; Arslanagić (yellow card) 40'; Hanche-Olsen (yellow card) 63'; Dorsch (yellow card) 90+1'; Yaremchuk (yellow card) 90+5'	Report	Prevljak 7', 64' (pen.); Peeters (yellow card) 90'; Heris (yellow card) 90+2'	Stadium: Ghelamco Arena; Attendance: 0 Referee: Nicolas Laforge

15 February 2021 27	Gent	4–0	Excel Mouscron	Ghent
20:45 CET (UTC+1)	Yaremchuk 28', 85', 90+1'; Tissoudali 70'; Owusu (yellow card) 89'	Report	Agouzoul (yellow card) 65'	Stadium: Ghelamco Arena; Attendance: 0 Referee: Kevin Van Damme

19 February 2021 28	KV Mechelen	1–1	Gent	Mechelen
20:45 CET (UTC+1)	Storm 16'; Vanlerberghe (yellow card) 56'	Report	Yaremchuk 10'; Castro-Montes (yellow card) 81'	Stadium: Achter de Kazerne; Attendance: 0 Referee: Alexandre Boucaut

8 March 2021 30	Gent	1–0	Oostende	Ghent
20:45 CET (UTC+1)	Yaremchuk 41'; Bezus (yellow card) 52'	Report		Stadium: Ghelamco Arena; Attendance: 0 Referee: Wim Smet

15 March 2021 29	Gent	0–4	Club Brugge	Ghent
20:45 CET (UTC+1)		Report	Vanaken (yellow card) 19'; Dost 52', 67'; De Ketelaere 63'; Pérez 81'	Stadium: Ghelamco Arena; Attendance: 0 Referee: Bram van Driessche
Note: The match was originally scheduled for 28 February 2021, but was postponed after more than seven Club Brugge players tested positive for COVID-19.

21 March 2021 31	Gent	1–0	Cercle Brugge	Ghent
20:45 CET (UTC+1)	Yaremchuk (yellow card) 67'; Castro-Montes (penalty missed) 81', 81'; Kums (yellow card) 85'	Report	Lopes (yellow card) 14'; Ugbo (yellow card) 51'	Stadium: Ghelamco Arena; Attendance: 0 Referee: Jonathan Lardot

4 April 2021 32	Standard Liège	2–1	Gent	Liège
18:15 CEST (UTC+2)	Sissako (yellow card) 36'; Muleka 66'; Balikwisha 77'; Fai (yellow card) 81'	Report	Yaremchuk (penalty missed) 36'; Castro-Montes (penalty missed) 43', 43', (yellow card) 45+1'; Ngadeu-Ngadjui (yellow card) 60'; Kums (yellow card) 76'; Fortuna (yellow card) 77'	Stadium: Stade Maurice Dufrasne; Attendance: 0 Referee: Nicolas Laforge

10 April 2021 33	Gent	4–0	Charleroi	Ghent
20:45 CEST (UTC+2)	Bezus 4', 8' (pen.); Godeau (yellow card) 61'; Tissoudali 64'; Yaremchuk (yellow card) 79'; De Bruyn 86'; Dorsch (yellow card) 88'	Report	Kipré (yellow card) 37'; Van Cleemput (yellow card) 45+2'	Stadium: Ghelamco Arena; Attendance: 0 Referee: Nathan Verboomen

18 April 2021 34	Zulte Waregem	2–7	Gent	Waregem
18:00 CEST (UTC+2)	Marcq (yellow card) 30'; Deschacht (yellow card) 51'; Bruno 80'; Pletinckx 86'	Report	Castro-Montes 14', 40'; Yaremchuk 29', 84'; Ngadeu-Ngadjui 48'; Bezus (yellow card) 57'; Odjidja-Ofoe 63'; De Bruyn 75'	Stadium: Regenboogstadion; Attendance: 0 Referee: Lawrence Visser

==== Play-Off II ====
Pos	Team	Pld	W	D	L	GF	GA	GD	Pts	Qualification or relegation	GNT	MEC	OOS	STA
1	Gent	6	4	1	1	13	6	+7	38	Qualification for the Europa Conference League second qualifying round	—	2–2	2–1	2–0
2	Mechelen	6	3	2	1	15	11	+4	35		1–2	—	5–3	3–1
3	Oostende	6	2	1	3	15	16	−1	34		0–4	2–2	—	6–2
4	Standard Liège	6	1	0	5	7	17	−10	28		2–1	1–2	1–3	—

Source: Jupiler Pro League (in Dutch), Soccerway
Legend: Blue = home team win; Yellow = draw; Red = away team win.
Rules for classification: 1) Points; 2) Points without (possible) half points added due to rounding; 3) Regular season finishing position.

==== Results summary ====
Overall								Home						Away					
Pld	W	D	L	GF	GA	GD	Pts	W	D	L	GF	GA	GD	W	D	L	GF	GA	GD
6	4	1	1	13	6	+7	13	2	1	0	6	3	+3	2	0	1	7	3	+4

Last updated: 22 May 2021.
Source: Jupiler Pro League

==== Results by round ====
Round	1	2	3	4	5	6
Ground	H	A	H	A	H	A
Result	D	L	W	W	W	W
Position	2	4	3	2	2	1

Updated to match(es) played on 22 May 2021. Source: Jupiler Pro League
A = Away; H = Home; W = Win; D = Draw; L = Loss

==== Matches ====
2 May 2021 1	Gent	2–2	KV Mechelen	Ghent
16:00 CEST (UTC+2)	Owusu (yellow card) 7'; Yaremchuk 46'; Odjidja-Ofoe 49'	Report	Storm 29'; Druijf 32'; Schoofs (yellow card) 39'	Stadium: Ghelamco Arena; Attendance: 0 Referee: Nathan Verboomen

8 May 2021 2	Standard Liège	2–1	Gent	Liège
18:30 CEST (UTC+2)	Amallah 61', (yellow card) 70'; Gavory (yellow card) 72'; Balikwisha 77'; Klauss (yellow card) 86'; Tapsoba (yellow card) 90+4'	Report	Bezus 8'; Odjidja-Ofoe (yellow card) 45+1', (penalty missed) 79'; Dorsch (yellow card) 89'	Stadium: Stade Maurice Dufrasne; Attendance: 0 Referee: Jan Boterberg

13 May 2021 3	Gent	2–1	Oostende	Ghent
13:30 CEST (UTC+2)	Yaremchuk 14', (yellow card) 90+2'; Ngadeu-Ngadjui (yellow card) 25'; Godeau 59'	Report	D'Haese (yellow card) 43'; Hjulsager 62'; D'Arpino (yellow card) 73'; Gueye (yellow card) 81'	Stadium: Ghelamco Arena; Attendance: 0 Referee: Nicolas Laforge

16 May 2021 4	Oostende	0–4	Gent	Ostend
13:30 CEST (UTC+2)	Hubert (red card) 34'	Report	Bezus 20', 66'; Castro-Montes 43'; Vandendriessche 58' (o.g.); Hanche-Olsen (yellow card) 89'	Stadium: Diaz Arena; Attendance: 0 Referee: Erik Lambrechts

19 May 2021 5	Gent	2–0	Standard Liège	Ghent
21:00 CEST (UTC+2)	Malede 7'; Ngadeu-Ngadjui (yellow card) 40'; Castro-Montes (yellow card) 66'; Yaremchuk 90+4'	Report	Lestienne (yellow card) 49'; Balikwisha (yellow card) 70'	Stadium: Ghelamco Arena; Attendance: 0 Referee: Alexandre Boucaut

22 May 2021 6	KV Mechelen	1–2	Gent	Mechelen
20:00 CEST (UTC+2)	Mrabti (yellow card) 53'; Druijf 72' (pen.); Engvall (yellow card) 85'; Schoofs (yellow card) 88'; Bateau (yellow card) 90+2'	Report	Bezus (yellow card) 51', (goal) 57'; Tissoudali 67', (yellow card) 90+2'; Godeau (yellow card) 85'; Bolat (yellow card) 90+1'; Kums (yellow card) 90+5'; Emeka (yellow card) 90+5'	Stadium: Achter de Kazerne; Attendance: 0 Referee: Bram van Driessche

=== Belgian Cup ===
3 February 2021 Sixth round	Gent	5–0	Heur-Tongeren	Ghent
18:00 CET (UTC+1)	Tissoudali 26'; Bezus 35'; Samoise 54'; Niangbo 79'; Mbayo 90+2' (pen.)	Report		Stadium: Ghelamco Arena; Attendance: 0

11 February 2021 Seventh round	Gent	3–1	Charleroi	Ghent
20:45 CET (UTC+1)	Yaremchuk 74'; Odjidja-Ofoe 81'; Tissoudali (yellow card) 83'; Berahino 83' (o.g.)	Report	Nicholson 1'; Fall (yellow card) 72'	Stadium: Ghelamco Arena; Attendance: 0 Referee: Lawrence Visser

3 March 2021 Quarter-finals	Eupen	1–0	Gent	Eupen
18:00 CET (UTC+1)	Musona (yellow card) 35'; Prevljak (yellow card) 35'; Heris 49'; Amat (yellow card) 74'	Report		Stadium: Kehrwegstadion; Attendance: 0 Referee: Jan Boterberg

=== UEFA Champions League ===
==== Qualifying rounds ====
15 September 2020 Third qualifying round	Gent (Belgium)	2–1	(Austria) Rapid Wien	Ghent, Belgium
20:30 CEST (UTC+2)	Dorsch 36'; Yaremchuk 59' (pen.)	Report	Hofmann (yellow card) 5'; Arase (yellow card) 22'; Fountas (yellow card) 86'; Demir (yellow card) 90+1', (goal) 90+3'	Stadium: Ghelamco Arena; Attendance: 0 Referee: Andreas Ekberg (Sweden)

23 September 2020 Play-off round 1st leg	Gent (Belgium)	1–2	(Ukraine) Dynamo Kyiv	Ghent, Belgium
21:00 CEST (UTC+2)	Fortuna (yellow card) 13'; Kleindienst 41'; Bezus (yellow card) 50' (yellow-red card) 53'; Odjidja-Ofoe (yellow card) 56'	Report	Supriaha 9'; Rodrigues (yellow card) 31'; De Pena 79'; Shepelyev (yellow card) 87'	Stadium: Ghelamco Arena; Attendance: 0 Referee: Ovidiu Haţegan (Romania)

29 September 2020 Play-off round 2nd leg	Dynamo Kyiv (Ukraine)	3–0 (5–1 agg.)	(Belgium) Gent	Kyiv, Ukraine
22:00 EEST (UTC+3)	Buyalskyi 9'; De Pena 36' (pen.); Rodrigues 49' (pen.)	Report	Castro-Montes (yellow card) 29'; Plastun (yellow card) 42'; Fortuna (yellow card) 49'	Stadium: NSC Olimpiyskiy; Attendance: 0 Referee: Szymon Marciniak (Poland)

=== UEFA Europa League ===
==== Group stage ====
The group stage draw was held on 2 October 2020.

Pos	Team	Pld	W	D	L	GF	GA	GD	Pts	Qualification	HOF	ZVE	LIB	GNT
1	(Germany) TSG Hoffenheim	6	5	1	0	17	2	+15	16	Advance to knockout phase	—	2–0	5–0	4–1
2	(Serbia) Red Star Belgrade	6	3	2	1	9	4	+5	11	Advance to knockout phase	0–0	—	5–1	2–1
3	(Czech Republic) Slovan Liberec	6	2	1	3	4	13	−9	7		0–2	0–0	—	1–0
4	(Belgium) Gent	6	0	0	6	4	15	−11	0		1–4	0–2	1–2	—

Source: UEFA
Rules for classification: Group stage tiebreakers

22 October 2020 1	Slovan Liberec (Czech Republic)	1–0	(Belgium) Gent	Liberec, Czech Republic
21:00 CEST (UTC+2)	Helal 29'; Beran (yellow card) 45+1'	Report	Marreh (yellow card) 34'; Yaremchuk (yellow card) 68'; Hanche-Olsen (yellow card) 89'	Stadium: Stadion u Nisy; Attendance: 0 Referee: Manuel Schüttengruber (Austria)

29 October 2020 2	Gent (Belgium)	1–4	(Germany) 1899 Hoffenheim	Ghent, Belgium
18:55 CET (UTC+1)	Ngadeu-Ngadjui (yellow card) 35'; Kleindienst 90+3'	Report	Belfodil 36' (pen.); Rudy (yellow card) 51'; Grillitsch 52'; Vogt (yellow card) 72'; Gaćinović 73'; Baumgartner 90+4'	Stadium: Ghelamco Arena; Attendance: 0 Referee: Sandro Schärer (Switzerland)

5 November 2020 3	Red Star Belgrade (Serbia)	2–1	(Belgium) Gent	Belgrade, Serbia
21:00 CET (UTC+1)	Kanga 12'; Sanogo (yellow card) 45+1'; Milunović (yellow card) 45+2'; Katai 59', (yellow card) 84'; Gobeljić (yellow card) 90+6'	Report	Mohammadi (yellow card) 24'; Odjidja-Ofoe 31'; Bukari (yellow card) 84'	Stadium: Red Star Stadium; Attendance: 0 Referee: Michael Fabbri (Italy)

26 November 2020 4	Gent (Belgium)	0–2	(Serbia) Red Star Belgrade	Ghent, Belgium
18:55 CET (UTC+1)		Report	Petrović 2'; Milunović 58'; Ben (yellow card) 71'	Stadium: Ghelamco Arena; Attendance: 0 Referee: Filip Glova (Slovakia)

3 December 2020 5	Gent (Belgium)	1–2	(Czech Republic) Slovan Liberec	Ghent, Belgium
18:55 CET (UTC+1)	Mohammadi (yellow card) 52'; Yaremchuk 60', (yellow card) 90+6'; Kums (yellow card) 75'; Fortuna (yellow card) 85'; Bukari (yellow card) 90+2'	Report	Mara 32', (yellow card) 79'; Kacharaba 55'; Matoušek (yellow card) 85'; Sadílek (yellow card) 90+6'; Rabušic (yellow card) 90+6'	Stadium: Ghelamco Arena; Attendance: 0 Referee: Kateryna Monzul (Ukraine)

10 December 2020 6	1899 Hoffenheim (Germany)	4–1	(Belgium) Gent	Sinsheim, Germany
21:00 CET (UTC+1)	Beier 21', 49'; Skov 26'; John (yellow card) 44'; Kramarić 64'; Amade (yellow card) 90+3'	Report	Bezus (yellow card) 73'; Fortuna 81'	Stadium: Rhein-Neckar-Arena; Attendance: 0 Referee: Anastasios Papapetrou (Greece)

== Statistics ==
=== Squad appearances and goals ===
Last updated on 22 May 2021.

No.	Pos	Nat	Player	Total		Belgian Division		Belgian Cup		UEFA Champions League		UEFA Europa League	
No.	Pos	Nat	Player	Apps	Goals	Apps	Goals	Apps	Goals	Apps	Goals	Apps	Goals
Goalkeepers
1	GK	(Turkey) TUR	Sinan Bolat	37	0	33	0	2	0	0	0	2	0
26	GK	(Belgium) BEL	Colin Coosemans	1	0	0	0	0	0	0	0	1	0
33	GK	(Belgium) BEL	Davy Roef	13	0	6	0	1	0	3	0	3	0
Defenders
5	DF	(Cameroon) CMR	Michael Ngadeu-Ngadjui	34	1	26+1	1	0	0	3	0	4	0
14	DF	(Belgium) BEL	Alessio Castro-Montes	48	7	37	7	2	0	3	0	5+1	0
15	DF	(Iran) IRI	Milad Mohammadi	41	1	27+5	1	3	0	0+1	0	5	0
21	DF	(Norway) NOR	Andreas Hanche-Olsen	39	1	31	1	3	0	0	0	5	0
25	DF	(Angola) ANG	Núrio Fortuna	36	2	24+2	1	1+1	0	3	0	4+1	1
31	DF	(Belgium) BEL	Bruno Godeau	20	1	13+4	1	2+1	0	0	0	0	0
32	DF	(Ukraine) UKR	Ihor Plastun	18	2	9+5	2	0	0	2	0	1+1	0
36	DF	(Belgium) BEL	Dino Arslanagić	22	0	12+4	0	3	0	1	0	2	0
Midfielders
6	MF	(France) FRA	Elisha Owusu	35	0	19+6	0	3	0	3	0	4	0
8	MF	(Belgium) BEL	Vadis Odjidja-Ofoe	33	4	19+6	2	1+1	1	1+1	0	1+3	1
9	MF	(Ukraine) UKR	Roman Bezus	37	7	20+8	6	2+1	1	1+1	0	3+1	0
10	MF	(Georgia (country)) GEO	Giorgi Chakvetadze	4	0	2+1	0	0	0	1	0	0	0
12	MF	(Belgium) BEL	Alexandre De Bruyn	5	2	0+5	2	0	0	0	0	0	0
17	MF	(Nigeria) NGR	Adewale Oladoye	1	0	0+1	0	0	0	0	0	0	0
19	MF	(Belgium) BEL	Matisse Samoise	7	2	0+5	1	1	1	0+1	0	0	0
22	MF	(The Gambia) GAM	Sulayman Marreh	18	0	9+5	0	0	0	0+1	0	2+1	0
24	MF	(Belgium) BEL	Sven Kums	45	3	32+4	3	2	0	1	0	4+2	0
27	MF	(Belgium) BEL	Mathéo Parmentier	1	0	0+1	0	0	0	0	0	0	0
28	MF	(Belgium) BEL	Wouter George	3	0	0+1	0	0+1	0	0	0	0+1	0
30	MF	(Germany) GER	Niklas Dorsch	43	4	23+10	3	1+1	0	3	1	5	0
Forwards
7	FW	(Ukraine) UKR	Roman Yaremchuk	43	23	34	20	2	1	2	1	4+1	1
11	FW	(Ivory Coast) CIV	Anderson Niangbo	25	2	11+7	1	0+2	1	1	0	0+4	0
16	FW	(Nigeria) NGR	Chinonso Emeka	1	0	0+1	0	0	0	0	0	0	0
18	FW	(Belgium) BEL	Dylan Mbayo	5	1	0+4	0	0+1	1	0	0	0	0
20	FW	(Ghana) GHA	Osman Bukari	35	4	18+8	4	1+1	0	1	0	6	0
23	FW	(Israel) ISR	Yonas Malede	11	1	4+7	1	0	0	0	0	0	0
29	FW	(Belgium) BEL	Laurent Depoitre	28	2	11+12	2	1	0	3	0	0+1	0
34	FW	(Morocco) MAR	Tarik Tissoudali	22	7	7+7	5	2+1	1	0	0	2+3	1
Players who have made an appearance this season but have left the club
17	DF	(Democratic Republic of the Congo) COD	Jordan Botaka	15	0	4+4	0	0	0	0+2	0	3+2	0
19	MF	(Belgium) BEL	Brecht Dejaegere	1	0	0+1	0	0	0	0	0	0	0
34	FW	(Germany) GER	Tim Kleindienst	23	3	4+11	1	0	0	1+2	1	2+3	1

=== Goalscorers ===
As of 8 March 2021

Rank	No.	Pos	Nat	Name	Pro League	Belgian Cup	Champions League	Europa League	Total
1	7	FW	(Ukraine)	Roman Yaremchuk	15	1	1	1	18
2	35	FW	(Morocco)	Tarik Tissoudali	4	1	0	0	5
3	20	FW	(Ghana)	Osman Bukari	4	0	0	0	4
3	30	MF	(Germany)	Niklas Dorsch	3	0	1	0	4
5	24	MF	(Belgium)	Sven Kums	3	0	0	0	3
5	34	FW	(Germany)	Tim Kleindienst	1	0	1	1	3
7	8	MF	(Belgium)	Vadis Odjidja-Ofoe	0	1	0	1	2
7	11	FW	(Ivory Coast)	Anderson Niangbo	1	1	0	0	2
7	14	DF	(Belgium)	Alessio Castro-Montes	2	0	0	0	2
7	19	MF	(Belgium)	Matisse Samoise	1	1	0	0	2
7	25	DF	(Angola)	Núrio Fortuna	1	0	0	1	2
7	29	FW	(Belgium)	Laurent Depoitre	2	0	0	0	2
7	32	DF	(Ukraine)	Ihor Plastun	2	0	0	0	2
14	9	MF	(Ukraine)	Roman Bezus	0	1	0	0	1
14	18	FW	(Belgium)	Dylan Mbayo	0	1	0	0	1
14	21	DF	(Norway)	Andreas Hanche-Olsen	1	0	0	0	1
Own goals					1	1	0	0	2
Totals					42	8	3	4	57
