= 2019–20 KAA Gent season =

Gent
2019–20 season
- Chairman: Ivan De Witte
- Manager: Jess Thorup
- Stadium: Ghelamco Arena
- Belgian First Division A: 2nd
- Belgian Cup: Seventh round
- UEFA Europa League: Round of 32
- Top goalscorer: League: Jonathan David (18); All: Jonathan David (23)
Home colours	Away colours	Third colours

The 2019–20 season was K.A.A. Gent's 117th season in existence and the club's 31st consecutive season in the top flight of Belgium football. It covered a period from 1 July 2019 to 30 June 2020. Gent competed in the Belgian First Division A, the Belgian Cup and the UEFA Europa League.

== Players ==
As of 2 September 2019

=== Current squad ===
Note: Flags indicate national team as defined under FIFA eligibility rules; some limited exceptions apply. Players may hold more than one non-FIFA nationality.

No.	Pos.	Nation	Player
1	GK	BEL	Thomas Kaminski
2	DF	BEL	Jan Van den Bergh
3	MF	SUI	Nicky Beloko (on loan from Fiorentina)
5	DF	CMR	Michael Ngadeu-Ngadjui
6	MF	FRA	Elisha Owusu
7	FW	UKR	Roman Yaremchuk
8	MF	BEL	Vadis Odjidja-Ofoe (Captain)
9	MF	UKR	Roman Bezus
10	MF	GEO	Giorgi Chakvetadze
11	FW	FRA	Jean-Luc Dompé
12	DF	BEL	Franck Bahi
13	FW	GEO	Giorgi Kvilitaia
14	DF	BEL	Alessio Castro-Montes
15	DF	IRI	Milad Mohammadi
16	FW	CAN	Jonathan David
17	DF	FRA	Ibrahima Cissé
18	MF	BEL	Dylan Mbayo

No.	Pos.	Nation	Player
19	MF	BEL	Brecht Dejaegere
20	GK	BEL	Jari De Busser
21	DF	GHA	Nana Akwasi Asare
22	FW	NGR	Philip Azango
23	DF	SWE	Mikael Lustig
24	MF	BEL	Sven Kums (on loan from Anderlecht)
25	DF	NGR	Reuben Yem
26	GK	BEL	Colin Coosemans
28	DF	TUN	Dylan Bronn
29	FW	BEL	Laurent Depoitre
31	FW	JPN	Yuya Kubo
32	DF	UKR	Ihor Plastun
33	MF	BEL	Louis Verstraete
76	DF	BEL	Timothy Derijck
—	DF	COL	Deiver Machado
—	FW	SEN	Mamadou Sylla

==== Out on loan ====
For recent transfers, see List of Belgian football transfers summer 2018.
Note: Flags indicate national team as defined under FIFA eligibility rules; some limited exceptions apply. Players may hold more than one non-FIFA nationality.

No.	Pos.	Nation	Player
3	MF	SWE	Eric Smith (at Tromsø)
77	MF	GEO	Giorgi Beridze (at Lokeren)
–	MF	CRO	Franko Andrijašević (at HNK Rijeka)
–	FW	BEL	Stallone Limbombe (at Giresunspor)
–	FW	ISR	Lior Inbrum (at Hapoel Tel Aviv F.C.)

== Pre-season and friendlies ==
Win Draw Loss

21 June 2019 Friendly	KRC Gent (Belgium)	0–2	(Belgium) Gent

22 June 2019 Friendly	KVV Zelzate (Belgium)	0–4	(Belgium) Gent

28 June 2019 Friendly	KFC Merelbeke (Belgium)	1–6	(Belgium) Gent

29 June 2019 Friendly	SC Dikkelvenne (Belgium)	0–6	(Belgium) Gent

6 July 2019 Friendly	Gent (Belgium)	3–0	(Greece) Aris

13 July 2019 Friendly	Gent (Belgium)	2–4	(Belgium) Sint-Truiden

17 July 2019 Friendly	Gent (Belgium)	2–0	(Netherlands) AZ	Ghent, Belgium
20:30 CEST (UTC+2)				Stadium: Ghelamco Arena

20 July 2019 Friendly	Reims (France)	1–1	(Belgium) Gent	Le Touquet, France
18:00 CEST (UTC+2)	Oudin 75'		Sylla 52'	Stadium: Stade Gérard Houllier

10 January 2020 Friendly	FC Ingolstadt 04 (Germany)	2–3	(Belgium) Gent	Oliva, Spain
11:00 CET (UTC+1)	Eckert 15'; Elva 67'		Depoitre 35'; Kvilitaia 47', 87'	Stadium: Oliva Nova Golf & Beach Resort Campo 1

== Competitions ==
=== Overview ===
Competition	First match	Last match	Starting round	Final position	Record							
Competition	First match	Last match	Starting round	Final position	Pld	W	D	L	GF	GA	GD	Win %
Belgian First Division A	28 July 2019	7 March 2020	Matchday 1	2nd	29	16	7	6	59	34	+25	55.17
Belgian Cup	25 September 2019	4 December 2019	Sixth round	Seventh round	2	1	0	1	4	1	+3	50.00
Europa League	25 July 2019	27 February 2020	Second qualifying round	Round of 32	14	6	6	2	26	17	+9	42.86
Total					45	23	13	9	89	52	+37	51.11

Last updated: 7 March 2020
Source: Soccerway

=== Belgian First Division A ===
==== League table ====
Pos	Team	Pld	W	D	L	GF	GA	GD	Pts	Qualification or relegation
1	Club Brugge (C)	29	21	7	1	58	14	+44	70	Qualification for the Champions League group stage
2	Gent	29	16	7	6	59	34	+25	55	Qualification for the Champions League third qualifying round
3	Charleroi	29	15	9	5	49	23	+26	54	Qualification for the Europa League third qualifying round
4	Antwerp (Y)	29	15	8	6	49	32	+17	53	Qualification for the Europa League group stage (Note: Antwerp qualified for the Europa League group stage as the 2019–20 Belgian Cup winners.)
5	Standard Liège	29	14	7	8	47	32	+15	49	Qualification for the Europa League second qualifying round

Source: Belgian First Division A (in Dutch), Soccerway
Rules for classification: 1) Points; 2) Matches won; 3) Goal difference; 4) Goals scored; 5) Away goals scored; 6) Away matches won; 7) Play-off.
(C) Champions; (Y) Croky Cup winner

==== Results summary ====
Overall								Home						Away					
Pld	W	D	L	GF	GA	GD	Pts	W	D	L	GF	GA	GD	W	D	L	GF	GA	GD
29	16	7	6	59	34	+25	55	11	3	1	38	14	+24	5	4	5	21	20	+1

Last updated: 7 March 2020.
Source: Jupiler Pro League

==== Results by round ====
Round	1	2	3	4	5	6	7	8	9	10	11	12	13	14	15	16	17	18	19	20	21	22	23	24	25	26	27	28	29	30
Ground	H	A	H	A	H	A	A	H	A	H	A	H	H	A	H	A	H	H	A	H	A	H	A	A	H	A	H	A	H	A
Result	D	W	L	W	W	W	D	W	L	W	D	D	W	W	L	D	W	W	L	D	W	W	W	W	D	W	W	L	L	C
Position	8	6	8	5	8	5	4	5	3	3	3	4	4	3	2	2	3	2	3	3	2	2	2	2	2	2	2	2	2	2

Updated to match(es) played on 7 March 2020. Source: Jupiler Pro League
A = Away; H = Home; W = Win; D = Draw; L = Loss

==== Matches ====
On 2 April 2020, the Jupiler Pro League's board of directors proposed to cancel the season due to the COVID-19 pandemic. The General Assembly accepted the proposal on 15 May, and officially ended the 2019–20 season.

28 July 2019 1	Charleroi	1–1	Gent	Charleroi
18:00 CEST (UTC+2)	Bruno 89'	Report	Asare (yellow card) 53'; Ngadeu-Ngadjui 56'; Plastun (yellow card) 78'	Stadium: Stade du Pays de Charleroi; Attendance: 8,760; Referee: Nicolas Laforge

4 August 2019 2	Gent	6–1	Eupen	Ghent
14:30 CEST (UTC+2)	Plastun 2'; Ngadeu-Ngadjui 9'; Bezus 33', 90'; Yaremchuk 41'; David 90+2'	Report	Blondelle (yellow card) 39', (goal) 63'; Amat (yellow card) 60'	Stadium: Ghelamco Arena; Attendance: 17,780; Referee: Lawrence Visser

11 August 2019 3	Excel Mouscron	2–1	Gent	Mouscron
20:00 CEST (UTC+2)	Boya 34'; Campins 44'	Report	Depoitre 25'; Asare (yellow card) 60'	Stadium: Stade Le Canonnier; Attendance: 3,753; Referee: Jan Boterberg

18 August 2019 4	Gent	2–0	Oostende	Ghent
20:00 CEST (UTC+2)	Yaremchuk 48'; David 53'	Report	Milović (yellow card) 81'	Stadium: Ghelamco Arena; Attendance: 17,860; Referee: Wesley Alen

1 September 2019 5	Gent	3–2	Cercle Brugge	Ghent
20:00 CEST (UTC+2)	Depoitre 11'; David 24', 27'; Mohammadi (yellow card) 36'	Report	Peeters 15', 90+2', (yellow card) 29'; Kouamé (yellow card) 45'; Saadi (yellow card) 53'; Fiore (yellow card) 77'	Stadium: Ghelamco Arena; Attendance: 17,525; Referee: Bram Van Driessche

15 September 2019 6	Gent	3–0	Mechelen	Ghent
18:00 CEST (UTC+2)	David (yellow card) 28', (goal) 31'; Yaremchuk 29'; Depoitre 46'	Report	Hairemans (yellow card) 8'; Schoofs (yellow card) 19'; Bateau (yellow card) 73'	Stadium: Ghelamco Arena; Attendance: 19,560; Referee: Jonathan Lardot

22 September 2019 7	Zulte Waregem	2–2	Gent	Waregem
20:00 CEST (UTC+2)	Seck 12'; Larin 68'; Bürki (yellow card) 90+2'	Report	Yaremchuk 34', 76'; Asare (yellow card) 45+1'; Odjidja-Ofoe (red card) 83'	Stadium: Regenboogstadion; Attendance: 8,237; Referee: Wim Smet

28 September 2019 8	Gent	2–0	Kortrijk	Ghent
20:00 CEST (UTC+2)	Yaremchuk (yellow card) 43'; Ngadeu-Ngadjui 58', (yellow card) 85'; David 87'	Report		Stadium: Ghelamco Arena; Attendance: 18,311; Referee: Alexandre Boucaut

6 October 2019 9	Club Brugge	4–0	Gent	Bruges
14:30 CEST (UTC+2)	Vanaken 11'; Diatta 28'; Dennis 51'; Mata (yellow card) 62'; Okereke (yellow card) 80'; Schrijvers (yellow card) 88'; Diagne 90+2', (yellow card) 90+2'	Report	Yaremchuk (yellow card) 33'; David (yellow card) 35'; Asare (yellow card) 89'	Stadium: Jan Breydel Stadium; Attendance: 24,382; Referee: Jonathan Lardot

19 October 2019 10	Gent	2–0	Waasland-Beveren	Ghent
20:30 CEST (UTC+2)	Yaremchuk 18'; Depoitre 66'; Ngadeu-Ngadjui (yellow card) 81'	Report	Tshibola (yellow card) 10'; Wiegel (yellow card) 29'	Stadium: Ghelamco Arena; Attendance: 19,016; Referee: Wim Smet

27 October 2019 11	Sint-Truiden	0–0	Gent	Sint-Truiden
18:00 CET (UTC+1)		Report	Bezus (yellow card) 29'; Odjidja-Ofoe (yellow card) 83'	Stadium: Stayen; Attendance: 6,000; Referee: Jan Boterberg

31 October 2019 12	Anderlecht	3–3	Gent	Anderlecht
20:30 CET (UTC+1)	Verschaeren 17'; Roofe 68', 70'; Lokonga (yellow card) 78'	Report	Depoitre 24', (yellow card) 57'; Yaremchuk 84'; Plastun (yellow card) 86', (goal) 90+4'	Stadium: Constant Vanden Stock Stadium; Attendance: 21,500; Referee: Bram Van Driessche

3 November 2019 13	Gent	3–1	Standard Liège	Ghent
18:00 CET (UTC+1)	Odjidja-Ofoe (yellow card) 41' (yellow-red card) 71'; Bezus 48'; David 85'; Castro-Montes 90', (yellow card) 90+1'	Report	Oularé (yellow card) 36'; Amallah 43', (yellow card) 67'; M'Poku (yellow card) 50'; Vanheusden (yellow card) 70' (yellow-red card) 83'	Stadium: Ghelamco Arena; Attendance: 19,441; Referee: Lothar D'hondt

10 November 2019 14	Genk	0–2	Gent	Genk
18:00 CET (UTC+1)	Cuesta (yellow card) 53'; Heynen (yellow card) 66'; Dewaest (yellow card) 71'	Report	Depoitre 2'; David 47'	Stadium: Luminus Arena; Attendance: 19,962; Referee: Erik Lambrechts

21 November 2019 15	Antwerp	3–2	Gent	Antwerp
20:30 CET (UTC+1)	Mbokani 25', 48'; Refaelov 33'; Rodrigues (yellow card) 39'; Haroun (yellow card) 64'; De Laet (yellow card) 86'; Arslanagić (yellow card) 90+5'	Report	Yaremchuk 21', (yellow card) 86'; Owusu (yellow card) 31'; Kums (yellow card) 47'; Bezus (yellow card) 83'; David (yellow card) 85', (goal) 90+4'	Stadium: Bosuilstadion; Attendance: 12,500; Referee: Nicolas Laforge
Note: The match was originally scheduled to be played on 25 August 2019, but was postponed so that the clubs can have time to prepare for their respective continental legs.

24 November 2019 16	Gent	1–1	Antwerp	Ghent
14:30 CET (UTC+1)	Yaremchuk 13'; Kums (yellow card) 90+1'	Report	Arslanagić (yellow card) 25'; Mbokani (yellow card) 42'; De Sart (yellow card) 60'; De Laet (yellow card) 62'; Lamkel Zé (yellow card) 78'; Haroun (yellow card) 81'; Gano 90+4'	Stadium: Ghelamco Arena; Attendance: 19,491; Referee: Lawrence Visser

1 December 2019 17	Kortrijk	0–2	Gent	Kortrijk
20:00 CET (UTC+1)	Azouni (yellow card) 22'; Kovačević (yellow card) 61'; Tuta (yellow card) 80'	Report	Bezus 14', (yellow card) 28'; Kums (yellow card) 45'; Odjidja-Ofoe 62' (pen.); Castro-Montes (yellow card) 79'	Stadium: Guldensporen Stadion; Referee: Nathan Verboomen

7 December 2019 18	Gent	2–0	Zulte Waregem	Ghent
20:00 CET (UTC+1)	Bezus 2', (yellow card) 40'; Yaremchuk 28'; Owusu (yellow card) 38'	Report	Marcq (yellow card) 54'	Stadium: Ghelamco Arena; Referee: Jonathan Lardot

15 December 2019 19	Oostende	2–1	Gent	Ostend
20:00 CET (UTC+1)	Hjulsager 27', (yellow card) 79'; Vargas 54'; Ndenbe (yellow card) 58'; Bataille (yellow card) 72'; Vandendriessche (yellow card) 89'	Report	Depoitre 10'	Stadium: Versluys Arena; Referee: Bert Put

22 December 2019 20	Gent	1–1	Club Brugge	Ghent
14:30 CET (UTC+1)	Depoitre (yellow card) 59'; David (yellow card) 71'; Odjidja-Ofoe 73', (yellow card) 86'; Bezus (yellow card) 90+3'	Report	Dennis 57'; Álvarez (yellow card) 89'	Stadium: Ghelamco Arena; Referee: Lawrence Visser

26 December 2019 21	Standard Liège	0–1	Gent	Liège
20:30 CET (UTC+1)		Report	Yaremchuk (yellow card) 56'; Odjidja-Ofoe (yellow card) 62'; Kums 83'; Castro-Montes (yellow card) 88'	Stadium: Stade Maurice Dufrasne; Referee: Bram Van Driessche

18 January 2020 22	Gent	3–1	Excel Mouscron	Ghent
20:30 CET (UTC+1)	Depoitre 9'; Owusu (yellow card) 40'; David 75', 77'	Report	Osabutey 51', (yellow card) 55'; Perica (yellow card) 89'	Stadium: Ghelamco Arena; Referee: Nicolas Laforge

25 January 2020 23	Gent	4–1	Genk	Ghent
20:30 CET (UTC+1)	Mohammadi 45'; Bezus 52'; Odjidja-Ofoe 88'; Niangbo 90+4'	Report	Bongonda 16', (yellow card) 23'	Stadium: Ghelamco Arena; Referee: Erik Lambrechts

1 February 2020 24	Mechelen	0–3	Gent	Mechelen
20:30 CET (UTC+1)	Van Cleemput (yellow card) 22'; Kaya (yellow card) 45+1'; Schoofs (yellow card) 45+5'	Report	Bezus 1'; Kvilitaia (yellow card) 18'; David 50'; Kums (yellow card) 53'; Niangbo 90+5'	Stadium: Achter de Kazerne; Referee: Jan Boterberg

7 February 2020 25	Gent	1–1	Anderlecht	Ghent
20:30 CET (UTC+1)	David 28' (pen.); Marreh (yellow card) 58'; Dejaegere (yellow card) 90+4'	Report	Colassin 16'; Kana (yellow card) 27'; Murillo (yellow card) 39'; Amuzu (yellow card) 62'; Žulj (yellow card) 82'	Stadium: Ghelamco Arena; Referee: Wesley Alen

14 February 2020 26	Eupen	2–3	Gent	Eupen
20:30 CET (UTC+1)	Prevljak 7'; Milićević 19'; Musona (yellow card) 75'; Ebrahimi (yellow card) 76'; Amat (yellow card) 90+1'	Report	David 5', 12'; Castro-Montes 84'; Odjidja-Ofoe (yellow card) 85'	Stadium: Kehrwegstadion; Referee: Jonathan Lardot

23 February 2020 27	Gent	4–1	Sint-Truiden	Ghent
20:00 CET (UTC+1)	David 10' (pen.), 26', 63'; Kvilitaia 14', (yellow card) 25'; Ngadeu-Ngadjui (yellow card) 21'; Odjidja-Ofoe (yellow card) 52'	Report	Colombatto (yellow card) 18'; Suzuki 68'	Stadium: Ghelamco Arena; Referee: Jasper Vergoote

1 March 2020 28	Cercle Brugge	1–0	Gent	Bruges
20:00 CET (UTC+1)	Hoggas 1'; Biancone (yellow card) 73'; Moser (yellow card) 90+7'	Report	Plastun (yellow card) 90+4'	Stadium: Jan Breydel Stadium; Attendance: 29,472; Referee: Lawrence Visser

7 March 2020 29	Gent	1–4	Charleroi	Ghent
20:00 CET (UTC+1)	Owusu (yellow card) 17'; Mohammadi (yellow card) 41' (yellow-red card) 84'; Niangbo 59'	Report	Nicholson 39'; Ilaimaharitra 44' (pen.); Fall 57'; Morioka (yellow card) 67'; Rezaei 89' (pen.)	Stadium: Ghelamco Arena; Attendance: 15,661; Referee: Jan Boterberg

15 March 2020 30	Waasland-Beveren	Cancelled	Gent	Beveren
18:00 CET (UTC+1)				Stadium: Freethiel Stadion
Note: The match was cancelled due to the COVID-19 pandemic.

=== Belgian Cup ===
25 September 2019 Sixth round	Eendracht Aalst	0–4	Gent	Aalst
20:30 CEST (UTC+2)	Razzi (yellow card) 29'; Wantens (yellow card) 73'	Report	Kvilitaia 9', 63'; Kubo 70'; Mbayo 83'	Stadium: Pierre Cornelisstadion; Referee: Christof Dierick

4 December 2019 Seventh round	Charleroi	1–0	Gent	Charleroi
20:45 CET (UTC+1)	Morioka (yellow card) 41'; Bruno 84'	Report	Kums (yellow card) 38'	Stadium: Stade du Pays de Charleroi; Attendance: 5,407; Referee: Erik Lambrechts

=== UEFA Europa League ===
==== Second qualifying round ====
25 July 2019 First leg	Gent (Belgium)	6–3	(Romania) Viitorul Constanța	Ghent, Belgium
20:30 CEST (UTC+2)	Asare 4'; Dejaegere 13'; Kubo 35', 45'; Yaremchuk 42' (pen.), 50'	Report	Mladen 21'; Țîru 56', 61'	Stadium: Ghelamco Arena; Attendance: 13,398; Referee: Aleksandar Stavrev (North Macedonia)

1 August 2019 Second leg	Viitorul Constanța (Romania)	2–1 (5–7 agg.)	(Belgium) Gent	Ovidiu, Romania
17:00 CEST (UTC+2)	Iancu 47' (pen.), 61' (pen.)	Report	Yaremchuk 38'	Stadium: Stadionul Viitorul; Attendance: 4,088; Referee: José Luis Munuera Montero (Spain)

==== Third qualifying round ====
8 August 2019 First leg	AEK Larnaca (Cyprus)	1–1	(Belgium) Gent	Larnaca, Cyprus
17:30 CEST (UTC+2)	Trichkovski 88'	Report	Yaremchuk 26'	Stadium: AEK Arena – Georgios Karapatakis; Attendance: 3,360; Referee: Svein Oddvar Moen (Norway)

15 August 2019 Second leg	Gent (Belgium)	3–0 (4–1 agg.)	(Cyprus) AEK Larnaca	Ghent, Belgium
20:30 CEST (UTC+2)	Depoitre 64'; David 90+3', 90+6'	Report		Stadium: Ghelamco Arena; Attendance: 15,533; Referee: Martin Strömbergsson (Sweden)

==== Play-off round ====
22 August 2019 First leg	Gent (Belgium)	2–1	(Croatia) Rijeka	Ghent, Belgium
20:30 CEST (UTC+2)	Depoitre 57', 71'	Report	Halilović 39'	Stadium: Ghelamco Arena; Attendance: 12,198; Referee: Daniel Stefański (Poland)

29 August 2019 Second leg	Rijeka (Croatia)	1–1 (2–3 agg.)	(Belgium) Gent	Rijeka, Croatia
20:00 CEST (UTC+2)	Puljić 32'	Report	Plastun 33'	Stadium: Stadion Rujevica; Attendance: 7,562; Referee: François Letexier (France)

==== Group stage ====
Pos	Team	Pld	W	D	L	GF	GA	GD	Pts	Qualification	GNT	WLF	STE	OLE
1	(Belgium) Gent	6	3	3	0	11	7	+4	12	Advance to knockout phase	—	2–2	3–2	2–1
2	(Germany) VfL Wolfsburg	6	3	2	1	9	7	+2	11	Advance to knockout phase	1–3	—	1–0	3–1
3	(France) Saint-Étienne	6	0	4	2	6	8	−2	4		0–0	1–1	—	1–1
4	(Ukraine) Oleksandriya	6	0	3	3	6	10	−4	3		1–1	0–1	2–2	—

Source: UEFA
Rules for classification: Group stage tiebreakers

19 September 2019 1	Gent (Belgium)	3–2	(France) Saint-Étienne	Ghent, Belgium
21:00 CEST (UTC+2)	David 2', 43'; Ngadeu-Ngadjui (yellow card) 49'; Kums (yellow card) 56'; Perrin 64' (o.g.)	Report	Khazri 38', (yellow card) 85'; Hamouma (yellow card) 44'; Trauco (yellow card) 71'; Kolodziejczak (yellow card) 73'; Kaminski 75' (o.g.)	Stadium: Ghelamco Arena; Attendance: 14,928; Referee: Roi Reinshreiber (Israel)

3 October 2019 2	Oleksandriya (Ukraine)	1–1	(Belgium) Gent	Lviv, Ukraine
18:55 CEST (UTC+2)	Sitalo 60'	Report	Depoitre 6'	Stadium: Arena Lviv; Attendance: 7,588; Referee: Jens Maae (Denmark)

24 October 2019 3	Gent (Belgium)	2–2	(Germany) VfL Wolfsburg	Ghent, Belgium
18:55 CEST (UTC+2)	Owusu (yellow card) 17'; Odjidja-Ofoe (yellow card) 28'; Asare (yellow card) 37'; Yaremchuk 41', 90+4'; Ngadeu-Ngadjui (yellow card) 54'	Report	Weghorst 3', (yellow card) 19'; João Victor 24'; William (yellow card) 33'; Mbabu (yellow card) 57'	Stadium: Ghelamco Arena; Attendance: 15,437; Referee: Sergey Ivanov (Russia)

7 November 2019 4	VfL Wolfsburg (Germany)	1–3	(Belgium) Gent	Wolfsburg, Germany
21:00 CET (UTC+1)	João Victor 20'; Arnold (yellow card) 45'; Knoche (yellow card) 75'; Steffen (yellow card) 85'	Report	Asare (yellow card) 45+2'; Plastun (yellow card) 46'; Yaremchuk 50'; Depoitre 65'; Ngadeu-Ngadjui 76'	Stadium: Volkswagen Arena; Attendance: 11,620; Referee: Massimiliano Irrati (Italy)

28 November 2019 5	Saint-Étienne (France)	0–0	(Belgium) Gent	Saint-Étienne, France
18:55 CET (UTC+1)	Camara (yellow card) 79'	Report	Owusu (yellow card) 45'; Ngadeu-Ngadjui (yellow card) 64' (yellow-red card) 76'	Stadium: Stade Geoffroy-Guichard; Attendance: 25,315; Referee: Irfan Peljto (Bosnia and Herzegovina)

12 December 2019 6	Gent (Belgium)	2–1	(Ukraine) Oleksandriya	Ghent, Belgium
21:00 CET (UTC+1)	Depoitre 7', 16'; Castro-Montes (yellow card) 70'; Kums (yellow card) 90+1'	Report	Miroshnichenko 54'; Kovalets (yellow card) 79'	Stadium: Ghelamco Arena; Attendance: 13,156; Referee: Radu Petrescu (Romania)

==== Knockout phase ====
===== Round of 32 =====
20 February 2020 First leg	Roma (Italy)	1–0	(Belgium) Gent	Rome, Italy
21:00 CET (UTC+1)	Pérez 13'; Smalling (yellow card) 65'	Report	Bezus (yellow card) 35'	Stadium: Stadio Olimpico; Attendance: 28,248; Referee: Georgi Kabakov (Bulgaria)

27 February 2020 Second leg	Gent (Belgium)	1–1 (1–2 agg.)	(Italy) Roma	Ghent, Belgium
18:55 CET (UTC+1)	David 25'; Bezus (yellow card) 28'; Depoitre (yellow card) 50'; Kums (yellow card) 83'; Mohammadi (yellow card) 90+3'; Odjidja-Ofoe (yellow card) 90+5'	Report	Kluivert 29'; Veretout (yellow card) 42'; Spinazzola (yellow card) 62'	Stadium: Ghelamco Arena; Attendance: 17,557; Referee: José María Sánchez Martínez (Spain)

== Statistics ==
=== Squad appearances and goals ===
Last updated on 7 March 2020.

No.	Pos	Nat	Player	Total		Belgian Division		Belgian Cup		UEFA Europa League	
No.	Pos	Nat	Player	Apps	Goals	Apps	Goals	Apps	Goals	Apps	Goals
Goalkeepers
1	GK	(Belgium) BEL	Thomas Kaminski	44	0	29	0	1	0	14	0
20	GK	(Belgium) BEL	Jari De Busser	0	0	0	0	0	0	0	0
26	GK	(Belgium) BEL	Colin Coosemans	2	0	0+1	0	1	0	0	0
Defenders
5	DF	(Cameroon) CMR	Michael Ngadeu-Ngadjui	42	4	29	3	1	0	12	1
12	DF	(Belgium) BEL	Franck Bahi	0	0	0	0	0	0	0	0
14	DF	(Belgium) BEL	Alessio Castro-Montes	31	2	14+7	2	1+1	0	2+6	0
15	DF	(Iran) IRI	Milad Mohammadi	24	1	17+1	1	2	0	3+1	0
17	DF	(France) FRA	Ibrahima Cissé	0	0	0	0	0	0	0	0
21	DF	(Ghana) GHA	Nana Akwasi Asare	23	1	12	0	0	0	11	1
23	DF	(Sweden) SWE	Mikael Lustig	30	0	14+2	0	1	0	13	0
25	DF	(Nigeria) NGR	Reuben Yem	0	0	0	0	0	0	0	0
31	DF	(Belgium) BEL	Bruno Godeau	1	0	0+1	0	0	0	0	0
32	DF	(Ukraine) UKR	Ihor Plastun	43	3	28	2	1	0	14	1
Midfielders
3	MF	(Sweden) SWE	Eric Smith	0	0	0	0	0	0	0	0
6	MF	(France) FRA	Elisha Owusu	41	0	27	0	0	0	14	0
8	MF	(Belgium) BEL	Vadis Odjidja-Ofoe	42	3	26	3	2	0	14	0
9	MF	(Ukraine) UKR	Roman Bezus	29	7	14+7	7	2	0	3+3	0
10	MF	(Georgia (country)) GEO	Giorgi Chakvetadze	12	0	2+7	0	0	0	0+3	0
18	MF	(Belgium) BEL	Dylan Mbayo	6	1	0+4	0	0+2	1	0	0
19	MF	(Belgium) BEL	Brecht Dejaegere	23	1	6+8	0	1	0	6+2	1
22	MF	(The Gambia) GAM	Sulayman Marreh	5	0	1+3	0	0	0	0+1	0
24	MF	(Belgium) BEL	Sven Kums	32	1	22	1	1	0	9	0
Forwards
7	FW	(Ukraine) UKR	Roman Yaremchuk	30	17	18	10	1	0	11	7
11	FW	(Ivory Coast) CIV	Anderson Niangbo	8	3	1+6	3	0	0	0+1	0
13	FW	(Georgia (country)) GEO	Giorgi Kvilitaia	33	3	8+15	1	1+1	2	0+8	0
16	FW	(Canada) CAN	Jonathan David	40	23	24+3	18	0	0	13	5
29	FW	(Belgium) BEL	Laurent Depoitre	35	15	19+3	8	1	0	11+1	7
Players who have made an appearance this season but have left the club
2	DF	(Belgium) BEL	Jan Van den Bergh	0	0	0	0	0	0	0	0
3	MF	(Switzerland) SUI	Nicky Beloko	0	0	0	0	0	0	0	0
4	DF	(Norway) NOR	Sigurd Rosted	1	0	0	0	0	0	1	0
11	FW	(France) FRA	Jean-Luc Dompé	9	0	0+6	0	1	0	0+2	0
22	MF	(Georgia (country)) GEO	Giorgi Beridze	2	0	0+1	0	0	0	0+1	0
22	FW	(Senegal) SEN	Mamadou Sylla	3	0	1	0	0+1	0	0+1	0
28	DF	(Tunisia) TUN	Dylan Bronn	7	0	2+3	0	1	0	0+1	0
31	FW	(Japan) JPN	Yuya Kubo	12	3	2+4	0	1	1	3+2	2
33	MF	(Belgium) BEL	Louis Verstraete	11	0	3+2	0	1+1	0	0+4	0
76	DF	(Belgium) BEL	Timothy Derijck	1	0	0	0	1	0	0	0
