= Louwagie =

Louwagie is a Belgian French surname.

== People with the surname ==
- Michel Louwagie (born 1956), Belgian sports manager
- Véronique Louwagie (born 1961), French politician
