= Alexandre De Bruyn =

Belgian footballer

Personal information
- Date of birth: 4 June 1994 (age 32)
- Place of birth: Belgium
- Height: 1.77 m (5 ft 10 in)
- Position: Attacking midfielder

Team information
- Current team: Schaerbeek
- Number: 14

Youth career
- –2016: Anderlecht

Senior career*
Years	Team	Apps	(Gls)
2016–2018	Lommel	49	(20)
2018–2020	Sint-Truiden	31	(2)
2020–2022	Gent	5	(2)
2022–2023	Kortrijk	4	(0)
2023	→ Dender EH (loan)	8	(1)
2023–2024	Lierse	23	(2)
2024–	Schaerbeek	15	(2)

International career
2010	Belgium U16	3	(1)
2011	Belgium U17	1	(0)
- * Club domestic league appearances and goals as of 5 October 2025

Alexandre De Bruyn (born 4 June 1994) is a Belgian professional footballer who plays for Belgian Division 1 side Schaerbeek as an attacking midfielder.

== Club career ==
He made his debut in the Belgian top flight on 28 July 2018 for Sint-Truiden starting against Cercle Brugge.

On 18 January 2022, De Bruyn signed a 2.5-year contract with Kortrijk, with the club option to extend for two more seasons. On 17 January 2023, he was loaned by Dender EH until the end of the season.

On 9 August 2023, De Bruyn joined Lierse on a one-year contract.

== Career statistics ==
=== Club ===
As of match played 23 August 2023

Appearances and goals by club, season and competition
Club	Season	League			National Cup (Note: Includes Belgian Cup)		Europe		Other		Total	
Club	Season	Division	Apps	Goals	Apps	Goals	Apps	Goals	Apps	Goals	Apps	Goals
Lommel	2016–17	Challenger Pro League	20	4	2	0	—		4 (Note: Appearance(s) in play-off)	0	26	4
Lommel	2017–18	Belgian National Division 1	29	16	1	0	—		6	1	36	17
Lommel	Total		49	20	3	0	—		10	1	62	21
Sint-Truiden	2018–19	Belgian Pro League	6	0	1	1	—		4	0	11	1
Sint-Truiden	2019–20	Belgian Pro League	25	3	0	0	—		—		25	3
Sint-Truiden	Total		31	3	1	1	—		4	0	36	4
Gent	2020–21	Belgian Pro League	2	2	0	0	0	0	3	0	5	2
Kortrijk	2022–23	Belgian Pro League	4	0	0	0	—		—		4	0
Dender (loan)	2022–23	Challenger Pro League	4	1	0	0	—		4	0	8	1
Career total			90	26	4	1	0	0	21	1	115	28
