= Roman Yaremchuk =

Ukrainian footballer (born 1995)

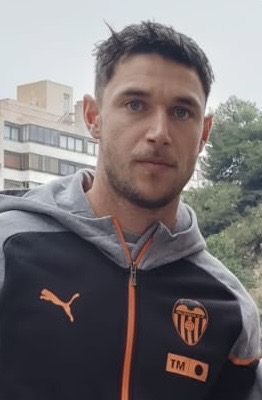
- Yaremchuk with Valencia in 2023

Personal information
- Full name: Roman Olehovych Yaremchuk
- Date of birth: 27 November 1995 (age 30)
- Place of birth: Lviv, Ukraine
- Height: 1.91 m (6 ft 3 in)
- Position: Striker

Team information
- Current team: Olympiacos
- Number: 11

Youth career
- 2002–2007: Karpaty Lviv
- 2007–2012: Dynamo Kyiv

Senior career*
| Years | Team | Apps | (Gls) |
| 2012–2017 | Dynamo Kyiv | 9 | (0) |
| 2013–2015 | → Dynamo-2 Kyiv | 42 | (7) |
| 2016 | → Oleksandriya (loan) | 14 | (5) |
| 2017–2021 | Gent | 121 | (47) |
| 2021–2022 | Benfica | 25 | (6) |
| 2022–2024 | Club Brugge | 25 | (2) |
| 2023–2024 | → Valencia (loan) | 25 | (3) |
| 2024– | Olympiacos | 36 | (4) |
| 2026 | → Lyon (loan) | 11 | (4) |

International career^{‡}
| 2012 | Ukraine U16 | 1 | (0) |
| 2012 | Ukraine U17 | 1 | (0) |
| 2012–2013 | Ukraine U18 | 8 | (1) |
| 2013–2014 | Ukraine U19 | 12 | (1) |
| 2014–2015 | Ukraine U21 | 10 | (1) |
| 2018– | Ukraine | 74 | (19) |
- * Club domestic league appearances and goals as of 20:25, 31 October 2026 (UTC) ‡ National team caps and goals as of 18 November 2026

Roman Olehovych Yaremchuk (Ukrainian: Рома́н Оле́гович Яремчу́к; born 27 November 1995) is a Ukrainian professional footballer who plays as a striker for Super League Greece club Olympiacos and the Ukraine national team.

After coming through Dynamo Kyiv's youth academy, Yaremchuk began playing for the club's reserve side in 2013 and was promoted to the first team two years later. He was loaned to fellow Ukrainian side Oleksandriya during the 2016–17 season, before moving to Belgian side Gent in 2018. A year later, he moved to Benfica in a transfer worth €18.5 million, before returning to Belgium the following season, to sign for Club Brugge for a transfer worth €16 million.

After representing Ukraine at various youth levels, Yaremchuk was called up to the full international side for the first time in September 2018, and played at UEFA Euro 2020 and Euro 2024.

== Club career ==
=== Dynamo Kyiv ===
==== Early career ====
Yaremchuk is a product of Karpaty Lviv and Dynamo Kyiv academies. His first coaches were Mykola Dudarenko in Karpaty and Oleksiy Drotsenko in FC Dynamo. On 6 September 2008, he made his debut for Dynamo in Ukrainian National Youth Competition against FC Yunist Chernihiv and scored twice, finishing the season with 21 appearances and 10 goals. He made his debut for FC Dynamo-2 as a second-half substitute against Desna Chernihiv on 14 July 2013 in the Ukrainian First League.

==== Loan to Oleksandriya ====
While playing for Oleksandriya in October 2016, Yaremchuk was the first player selected as player of the month in the Ukrainian Premier League. He scored the fastest goal in the history of the league, after seven seconds on 31 October, in a 2–2 draw against Vorskla Poltava.

=== Gent ===
In August 2017, Yaremchuk signed a four-year contract with Gent in the Belgian First Division A. He made his debut on 27 August, coming on as an 86th-minute substitute for Mamadou Sylla in a 0–0 home draw with Anderlecht, and scored his first goal on 3 November 2017 in a 1–0 home victory over Standard Liège.

In the 2019–20 UEFA Europa League, Yaremchuk scored three goals for Gent in the group stages, including a brace against VfL Wolfsburg on 24 October, before being eliminated in the round of 32 to Roma 2–1 on aggregate. On 20 January 2020, he had a surgery on an injured Achilles tendon. The recovery was estimated to take two to three months, ruling him out for the rest of the season.

During the 2020–21 campaign, Yaremchuk featured in 34 games and ended the season with a career-best 20 league goals and seven assists, including two hat-tricks against Waasland-Beveren on 1 November and Mouscron on 15 February in the regular season. On 15 November 2020, he tested positive for COVID-19.

=== Benfica ===
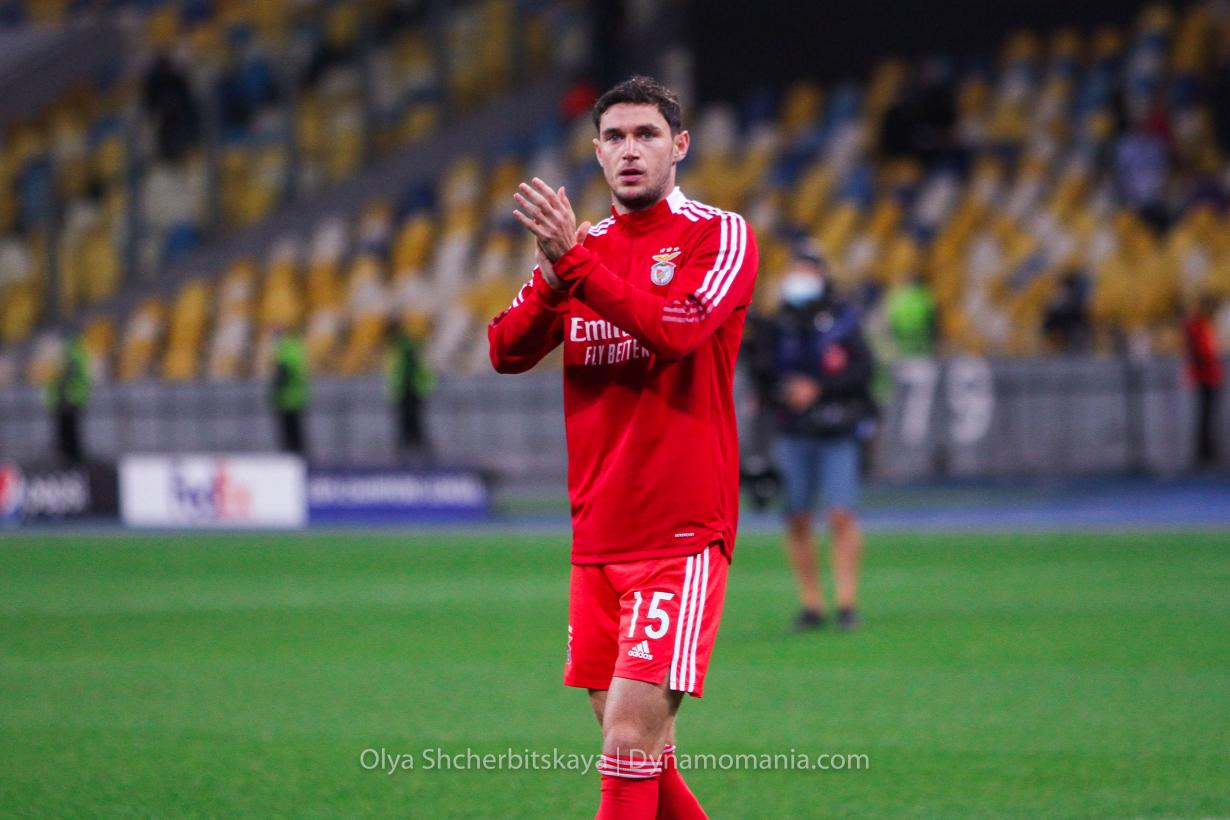
Yaremchuk playing for Benfica in 2021

On 31 July 2021, Benfica announced the signing of Yaremchuk on a five-year deal worth €18.5 million for 75% of his economic rights. He made his debut on 10 August, creating Benfica's second goal in the 2–0 home victory over Spartak Moscow in the third qualifying round of the UEFA Champions League. Four days later, he made his debut in the Primeira Liga, scoring in a 2–0 home victory over Arouca, and netted a brace in a 3–1 away victory over Vitória de Guimarães.

The following matches, Yaremchuk struggled to score goals, being 10 matches scoreless, before scoring his first goal in over three months, the opening goal for Benfica in a 2–0 home victory over his former club Dynamo Kyiv in the club's last UEFA Champions League group match, ensuring his teams' qualification to the round of sixteen.

On 23 February 2022, Yaremchuk scored the equaliser in a 2–2 home draw against Ajax, in the first leg of the round of 16 tie of the Champions League. Yaremchuk celebrated his goal by unveiling a shirt with Ukraine's coat of arms on it, as way of supporting his nation amid the previous day's invasion by Russia. Four days later, after coming on as a 62nd-minute substitute for Darwin Núñez, he received the club's captain armband by Jan Vertonghen, before receiving a standing ovation from Benfica's supporters, due to his country's invasion, during a 3–0 home victory against Vitória de Guimarães. On 13 April, he scored Benfica's second goal in a 3–3 draw against Liverpool in the second leg of the quarter-finals tie, while his team lost 6–4 on aggregate.

=== Club Brugge ===
On 29 August 2022, Club Brugge announced the signing of Yaremchuk on a 4-year deal for a transfer fee of €16 million, plus €3 million in add-ons, with Benfica also receiving 10% of a future transfer, in case Club Brugge received an offer equal or superior to €10 million.

=== Olympiacos ===
On 30 July 2024, Yaremchuk joined Super League Greece club Olympiacos on a permanent transfer. In the first leg their Greek Cup semi-final clash against rivals AEK Athens, Yaremchuk scored twice as Olympiacos won 6–0. On 30 March 2025, Yaremchuk scored twice in a 4–2 league victory over rivals Panathinaikos. On 17 May 2025, Yaremchuk scored in the final of the Greek Cup to seal a 2–0 victory over OFI and thereby securing a domestic double for the club.

=== Lyon ===
On 2 February 2026, Yaremchuk joined Ligue 1 side Olympique Lyonnais on loan from Olympiacos.

== International career ==
=== Youth ===
Yaremchuk represented Ukraine at under-16, under-17, under-18, under-19, under-20 and under-21 levels, for a total of 33 youth caps and scoring 4 goals overall. With the under-20s, he participated in the 2015 FIFA U-20 World Cup, helping Ukraine to a round of 16 finish, after losing to Senegal in a penalty shootout.

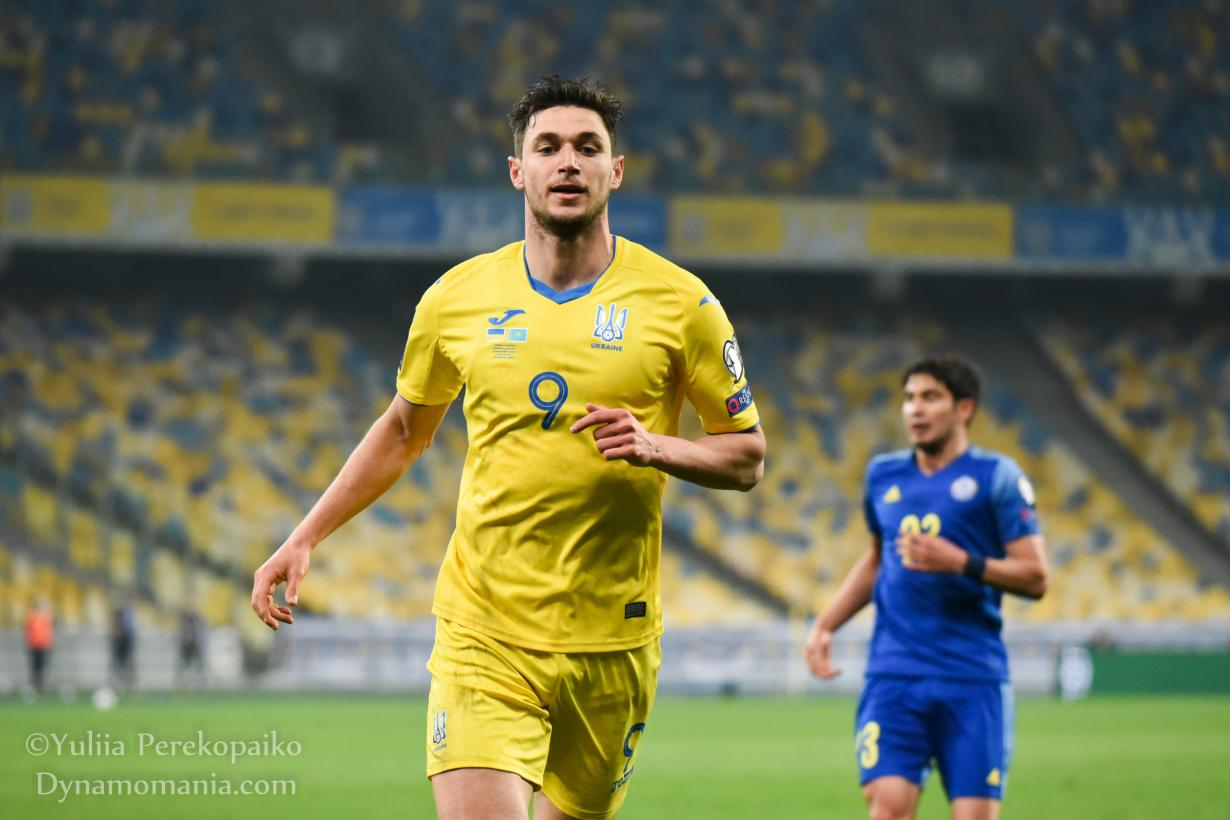
Yaremchuk playing for Ukraine in 2021

=== Senior ===
In September 2018, Yaremchuk debuted for the Ukraine national football team in a UEFA Nations League group stage match against the Czech Republic, which Ukraine won 2–1. On 7 June 2019, he scored his first goal for the national team and provided an assist in a 5–0 victory against Serbia in the UEFA Euro 2020 qualifiers.

On 14 October 2019, Yaremchuk scored from close range after an initial save from Rui Patrício, to help Ukraine to a 2–1 home victory over reigning European champions Portugal, leading their qualification to the 2020 UEFA European Championship, on top of their group. In their last qualifier, he scored on 17 November in a 2–2 away draw against Serbia in Belgrade.

Yaremchuk was included in the Ukrainian senior squad for Euro 2020. In its first group stage match, he assisted the first and scored the second goal in a 3–2 loss against the Netherlands at Johan Cruyff Arena in Amsterdam, and scored in a 2–1 victory against North Macedonia at Arena Națională in Bucharest.

In May 2024, Yaremchuk was called up to represent Ukraine at UEFA Euro 2024.

== Personal life ==
Yaremchuk married Christina in 2017. Their son was born in 2019. In 2022, following Ukraine's invasion by Russia, Yaremchuk asked fellow Ukraine national teammate Andriy Yarmolenko to help save his wife's parents. Yaremchuk revealed the situation was critical and he didn't even know what to do, so he turned to Andriy Yarmolenko, knowing that he was from Chernihiv, and he helped him and days later his wife's parents were rescued.

== Outside of professional football ==
In 2022, Yaremchuk raised a fairly large sum for the Armed Forces of Ukraine, in particular for the defenders of Chernihiv, and delivered bulletproof vests for the city.

== Career statistics ==
=== Club ===
As of match played 17 May 2026

Appearances and goals by club, season and competition
| Club | Season | League | | | National cup (Note: Includes Ukrainian Cup, Belgian Cup, Taça de Portugal, Copa del Rey, Greek Cup, Coupe de France) | | League cup (Note: Includes Taça da Liga) | | Europe | | Other | | Total | |
| Club | Season | Division | Apps | Goals | Apps | Goals | Apps | Goals | Apps | Goals | Apps | Goals | Apps | Goals |
|---|---|---|---|---|---|---|---|---|---|---|---|---|---|---|
| Dynamo-2 Kyiv | 2013–14 | Ukrainian First League | 19 | 3 | — | | — | | — | | — | | 19 | 3 |
| Dynamo-2 Kyiv | 2014–15 | Ukrainian First League | 23 | 4 | — | | — | | — | | — | | 23 | 4 |
| Dynamo-2 Kyiv | Total | | 42 | 7 | — | | — | | — | | — | | 42 | 7 |
| Dynamo Kyiv | 2015–16 | Ukrainian Premier League | 0 | 0 | 1 | 0 | — | | 0 | 0 | — | | 1 | 0 |
| Dynamo Kyiv | 2016–17 | Ukrainian Premier League | 9 | 0 | 1 | 0 | — | | 0 | 0 | — | | 10 | 0 |
| Dynamo Kyiv | Total | | 9 | 0 | 2 | 0 | — | | 0 | 0 | — | | 11 | 0 |
| Oleksandriya (loan) | 2016–17 | Ukrainian Premier League | 14 | 5 | 1 | 1 | — | | 2 (Note: Appearances in UEFA Europa League) | 0 | — | | 17 | 6 |
| Gent | 2017–18 | Belgian Pro League | 32 | 9 | 2 | 0 | — | | — | | — | | 34 | 9 |
| Gent | 2018–19 | Belgian Pro League | 37 | 8 | 4 | 3 | — | | 4 | 1 | — | | 45 | 12 |
| Gent | 2019–20 | Belgian Pro League | 18 | 10 | 1 | 0 | — | | 11 | 7 | — | | 30 | 17 |
| Gent | 2020–21 | Belgian Pro League | 34 | 20 | 2 | 1 | — | | 7 (Note: Two appearances and one goal in UEFA Champions League, five appearances and one goal in UEFA Europa League) | 2 | — | | 43 | 23 |
| Gent | Total | | 121 | 47 | 9 | 4 | — | | 22 | 10 | — | | 152 | 61 |
| Benfica | 2021–22 | Primeira Liga | 23 | 6 | 2 | 0 | 4 | 0 | 13 (Note: Appearance(s) in UEFA Champions League) | 3 | — | | 42 | 9 |
| Benfica | 2022–23 | Primeira Liga | 2 | 0 | 0 | 0 | 0 | 0 | 3 | 0 | — | | 5 | 0 |
| Benfica | Total | | 25 | 6 | 2 | 0 | 4 | 0 | 16 | 3 | — | | 47 | 9 |
| Club Brugge | 2022–23 | Belgian Pro League | 23 | 2 | 0 | 0 | — | | 4 | 0 | — | | 27 | 2 |
| Club Brugge | 2023–24 | Belgian Pro League | 2 | 0 | 0 | 0 | — | | 2 (Note: Appearances in UEFA Europa Conference League) | 4 | — | | 4 | 4 |
| Club Brugge | Total | | 25 | 2 | 0 | 0 | — | | 6 | 4 | — | | 31 | 6 |
| Valencia (loan) | 2023–24 | La Liga | 25 | 3 | 4 | 1 | — | | — | | — | | 29 | 4 |
| Olympiacos | 2024–25 | Super League Greece | 23 | 4 | 3 | 4 | — | | 7 | 2 | — | | 33 | 10 |
| Olympiacos | 2025–26 | Super League Greece | 9 | 0 | 4 | 4 | — | | 1 | 0 | 1 (Note: Appearance in Greek Super Cup) | 0 | 15 | 4 |
| Olympiacos | Total | | 32 | 4 | 7 | 8 | — | | 8 | 2 | 1 | 0 | 48 | 14 |
| Lyon (loan) | 2025–26 | Ligue 1 | 11 | 4 | 1 | 1 | — | | 2 | 0 | — | | 14 | 5 |
| Career total | | | 304 | 78 | 26 | 15 | 4 | 0 | 56 | 19 | 1 | 0 | 391 | 113 |

=== International ===
As of match played 17 November 2026

Appearances and goals by national team and year
| National team | Year | Apps | Goals |
|---|---|---|---|
| Ukraine | 2018 | 4 | 0 |
| Ukraine | 2019 | 8 | 5 |
| Ukraine | 2020 | 7 | 1 |
| Ukraine | 2021 | 17 | 6 |
| Ukraine | 2022 | 6 | 1 |
| Ukraine | 2023 | 4 | 0 |
| Ukraine | 2024 | 13 | 3 |
| Ukraine | 2025 | 6 | 0 |
| Ukraine | 2026 | 9 | 2 |
| Total | | 74 | 19 |

As of match played 5 October 2026. Ukraine score listed first, score column indicates score after each Yaremchuk goal.

List of international goals scored by Roman Yaremchuk
| No. | Date | Venue | Cap | Opponent | Score | Result | Competition |
|---|---|---|---|---|---|---|---|
| 1 | 7 June 2019 | Arena Lviv, Lviv, Ukraine | 8 | Serbia | 4–0 | 5–0 | UEFA Euro 2020 qualifying |
| 2 | 10 June 2019 | Arena Lviv, Lviv, Ukraine | 9 | Luxembourg | 1–0 | 1–0 | UEFA Euro 2020 qualifying |
| 3 | 10 September 2019 | Dnipro Arena, Dnipro, Ukraine | 10 | Nigeria | 2–2 | 2–2 | Friendly |
| 4 | 14 October 2019 | Olimpiyskiy National Sports Complex, Kyiv, Ukraine | 11 | Portugal | 1–0 | 2–1 | UEFA Euro 2020 qualifying |
| 5 | 17 November 2019 | Red Star Stadium, Belgrade, Serbia | 12 | Serbia | 1–1 | 2–2 | UEFA Euro 2020 qualifying |
| 6 | 14 November 2020 | Red Bull Arena, Leipzig, Germany | 19 | Germany | 1–0 | 1–3 | 2020–21 UEFA Nations League A |
| 7 | 31 March 2021 | Olimpiyskiy National Sports Complex, Kyiv, Ukraine | 22 | Kazakhstan | 1–0 | 1–1 | 2022 FIFA World Cup qualification |
| 8 | 7 June 2021 | Metalist Stadium, Kharkiv, Ukraine | 24 | Cyprus | 3–0 | 4–0 | Friendly |
| 9 | 13 June 2021 | Johan Cruyff Arena, Amsterdam, Netherlands | 25 | Netherlands | 2–2 | 2–3 | UEFA Euro 2020 |
| 10 | 17 June 2021 | Arena Națională, Bucharest, Romania | 26 | North Macedonia | 2–0 | 2–1 | UEFA Euro 2020 |
| 11 | 1 September 2021 | Astana Arena, Nur-Sultan, Kazakhstan | 30 | Kazakhstan | 1–0 | 2–2 | 2022 FIFA World Cup qualification |
| 12 | 9 October 2021 | Helsinki Olympic Stadium, Helsinki, Finland | 33 | Finland | 2–1 | 2–1 | 2022 FIFA World Cup qualification |
| 13 | 1 June 2022 | Hampden Park, Glasgow, Scotland | 37 | Scotland | 2–0 | 3–1 | 2022 FIFA World Cup qualification |
| 14 | 21 March 2024 | Bilino Polje Stadium, Zenica, Bosnia and Herzegovina | 47 | Bosnia and Herzegovina | 1–1 | 2–1 | UEFA Euro 2024 qualifying |
| 15 | 11 June 2024 | Zimbru Stadium, Chișinău, Moldova | 50 | Moldova | 1–0 | 4–0 | Friendly |
| 16 | 21 June 2024 | Merkur Spiel-Arena, Düsseldorf, Germany | 52 | Slovakia | 2–1 | 2–1 | UEFA Euro 2024 |
| 17 | 19 November 2024 | Arena Kombëtare, Tirana, Albania | 59 | Albania | 2–0 | 2–1 | 2024–25 UEFA Nations League B |
| 18 | 31 May 2026 | Wrocław Stadium, Wrocław, Poland | 68 | Poland | 1–0 | 2–0 | Friendly |
| 19 | 5 October 2026 | Anton Malatinský Stadium, Trnava, Slovakia | 72 | Hungary | 1–1 | 1–2 | 2026–27 UEFA Nations League B |

== Honours ==
Olympiacos

- Super League Greece: 2024–25
- Greek Football Cup: 2024–25
- Greek Super Cup: 2025

Individual

- Ukrainian Premier League Player of the Month: October 2016
