= Roman Bezus =

Ukrainian footballer (born 1990)

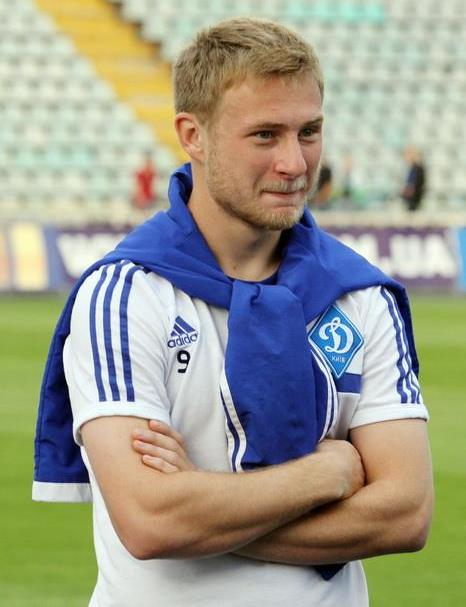
- Bezus with Dynamo Kyiv in 2014

Personal information
- Full name: Roman Anatoliyovych Bezus
- Date of birth: 26 September 1990 (age 36)
- Place of birth: Kremenchuk, Ukrainian SSR, Soviet Union
- Height: 1.85 m (6 ft 1 in)
- Positions: Attacking midfielder; second striker

Youth career
- 2003–2004: Kremin Kremenchuk
- 2004: Molod Poltava
- 2004–2007: Kremin Kremenchuk

Senior career*
| Years | Team | Apps | (Gls) |
| 2006–2008 | Kremin Kremenchuk | 69 | (10) |
| 2009–2013 | Vorskla Poltava | 91 | (20) |
| 2013–2015 | Dynamo Kyiv | 33 | (4) |
| 2015–2016 | Dnipro Dnipropetrovsk | 31 | (5) |
| 2016–2018 | Sint-Truiden | 63 | (10) |
| 2019–2022 | Gent | 90 | (16) |
| 2022–2025 | Omonia | 68 | (10) |
| 2025–2026 | Anorthosis | 12 | (0) |

International career^{‡}
| 2010 | Ukraine U20 | 1 | (1) |
| 2010–2012 | Ukraine U21 | 12 | (4) |
| 2011– | Ukraine | 24 | (5) |
- * Club domestic league appearances and goals as of 06:46, 27 May 2025 (UTC) ‡ National team caps and goals as of 1 July 2021

Roman Anatoliyovych Bezus (Ukrainian: Роман Анатолійович Безус; born 26 September 1990) is a Ukrainian professional footballer who plays as a second striker or as an attacking midfielder.

== Club career ==
On 10 January 2015, Bezus moved to Dnipro from Dynamo Kyiv. In 2012, Bezus was awarded the prize for the best rookie of the year.

On 12 July 2016, he signed a one-year deal with Belgian Sint-Truiden.

On 25 January 2019, Bezus signed a deal for three and a half years with Belgian Gent.

On 6 August 2022, Bezus signed with Cypriot club Omonia.

== International career ==
Bezus was called up to Ukraine U21 for a friendly match against Cyprus on 3 March 2010, but was not selected for game. He made his debut in a friendly match against the Czech Republic on 17 November 2010.

On 11 November 2011, Bezus made his debut for the senior Ukraine national team in a friendly match against Germany. On 14 November 2019, he scored a winning goal for Ukraine in the friendly game against Estonia.

== Career statistics ==
=== Club ===
As of 2 October 2025

Appearances and goals by club, season and competition
| Club | Season | League | | | Cup | | Continental | | Other | | Total | |
| Club | Season | Division | Apps | Goals | Apps | Goals | Apps | Goals | Apps | Goals | Apps | Goals |
|---|---|---|---|---|---|---|---|---|---|---|---|---|
| Vorskla | 2008–09 | Ukrainian Premier League | 1 | 0 | 1 | 0 | — | | — | | 2 | 0 |
| Vorskla | 2009–10 | Ukrainian Premier League | 20 | 3 | 1 | 0 | 2 | 0 | 1 | 0 | 24 | 3 |
| Vorskla | 2010–11 | Ukrainian Premier League | 26 | 5 | 2 | 1 | — | | — | | 28 | 6 |
| Vorskla | 2011–12 | Ukrainian Premier League | 28 | 6 | 1 | 0 | 11 | 2 | — | | 40 | 8 |
| Vorskla | 2012–13 | Ukrainian Premier League | 16 | 6 | 1 | 1 | — | | — | | 17 | 7 |
| Vorskla | Total | | 91 | 20 | 6 | 2 | 13 | 2 | 1 | 0 | 111 | 24 |
| Dynamo Kyiv | 2012–13 | Ukrainian Premier League | 9 | 1 | 0 | 0 | 2 | 0 | — | | 11 | 1 |
| Dynamo Kyiv | 2013–14 | Ukrainian Premier League | 15 | 2 | 2 | 0 | 7 | 1 | — | | 24 | 3 |
| Dynamo Kyiv | 2014–15 | Ukrainian Premier League | 9 | 1 | 2 | 0 | 0 | 0 | 1 | 0 | 12 | 1 |
| Dynamo Kyiv | Total | | 33 | 4 | 4 | 0 | 9 | 1 | 1 | 0 | 47 | 5 |
| Dnipro Dnipropetrovsk | 2014–15 | Ukrainian Premier League | 11 | 1 | 2 | 1 | 8 | 0 | — | | 21 | 2 |
| Dnipro Dnipropetrovsk | 2015–16 | Ukrainian Premier League | 20 | 4 | 5 | 0 | 4 | 0 | — | | 29 | 4 |
| Dnipro Dnipropetrovsk | Total | | 31 | 5 | 7 | 1 | 12 | 0 | — | | 50 | 6 |
| Sint-Truiden | 2016–17 | Belgian First Division A | 20 | 1 | 2 | 1 | — | | — | | 22 | 2 |
| Sint-Truiden | 2017–18 | Belgian First Division A | 27 | 6 | 2 | 0 | — | | — | | 29 | 6 |
| Sint-Truiden | 2018–19 | Belgian First Division A | 16 | 3 | 3 | 1 | — | | — | | 19 | 4 |
| Sint-Truiden | Total | | 63 | 10 | 7 | 2 | — | | — | | 70 | 12 |
| Gent | 2018–19 | Belgian First Division A | 15 | 0 | 2 | 1 | — | | — | | 17 | 1 |
| Gent | 2019–20 | Belgian First Division A | 21 | 7 | 2 | 0 | 6 | 0 | — | | 29 | 7 |
| Gent | 2020–21 | Belgian First Division A | 28 | 6 | 3 | 1 | 6 | 0 | — | | 37 | 7 |
| Gent | 2021–22 | Belgian First Division A | 26 | 3 | 1 | 0 | 9 | 0 | — | | 36 | 3 |
| Gent | Total | | 90 | 16 | 8 | 2 | 21 | 0 | — | | 119 | 18 |
| Omonia | 2022–23 | Cypriot First Division | 26 | 3 | 4 | 1 | 6 | 0 | 0 | 0 | 36 | 4 |
| Omonia | 2023–24 | Cypriot First Division | 30 | 7 | 3 | 1 | 4 | 6 | 1 | 0 | 38 | 14 |
| Omonia | 2024–25 | Cypriot First Division | 12 | 0 | 4 | 1 | — | | — | | 16 | 1 |
| Omonia | Total | | 68 | 10 | 11 | 3 | 10 | 6 | 1 | 0 | 90 | 19 |
| Anorthosis | 2025–26 | Cypriot First Division | 12 | 0 | 0 | 0 | — | | — | | 12 | 0 |
| Career total | | | 389 | 65 | 343 | 10 | 64 | 7 | 3 | 0 | 488 | 91 |

=== International goals ===
Scores and results list Ukraine's goal tally first, score column indicates score after each Bezus goal.

List of international goals scored by Roman Bezus
| No. | Date | Venue | Opponent | Score | Result | Competition |
|---|---|---|---|---|---|---|
| 1 | 7 June 2013 | Podgorica City Stadium, Podgorica, Montenegro | Montenegro | 4–0 | 4–0 | 2014 FIFA World Cup qualification |
| 2 | 6 September 2013 | Arena Lviv, Lviv, Ukraine | San Marino | 7–0 | 9–0 | 2014 FIFA World Cup qualification |
| 3 | 15 October 2013 | Stadio Olimpico, Serravalle, San Marino | San Marino | 7–0 | 8–0 | 2014 FIFA World Cup qualification |
| 4 | 3 September 2014 | Olympic Stadium, Kyiv, Ukraine | Moldova | 1–0 | 1–0 | Friendly |
| 5 | 14 November 2019 | Slavutych-Arena, Zaporizhia, Ukraine | Estonia | 1–0 | 1–0 | Friendly |

== Honours ==
Vorskla Poltava

- Ukrainian Cup: 2009–10

Dynamo Kyiv

- Ukrainian Premier League: 2014–15
- Ukrainian Cup: 2013–14, 2014–15

FC Dnipro Dnipropetrovsk

- UEFA Europa League: runner-up 2014–15

Gent

- Belgian Cup: 2021–22

Omonia

- Cypriot Cup: 2022–23
