= Colin Coosemans =

Belgian footballer (born 1992)

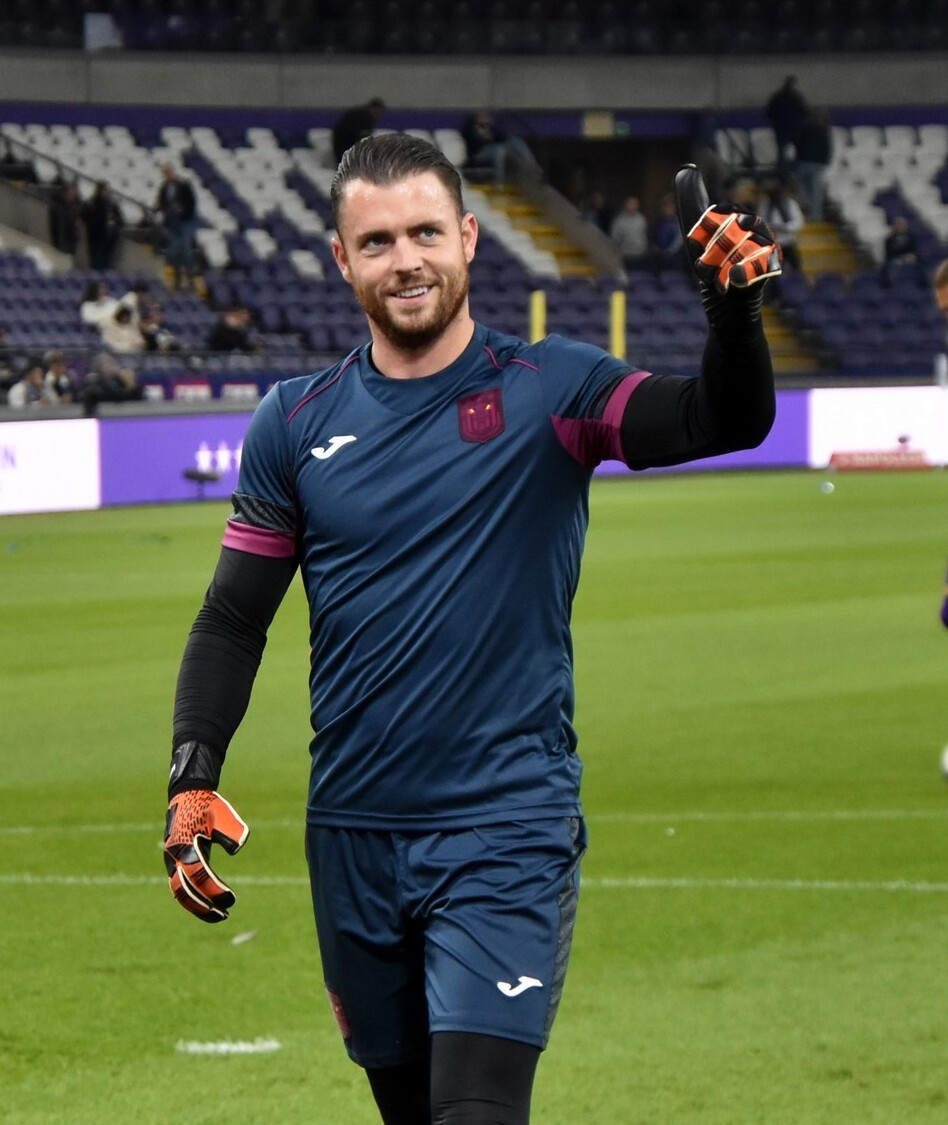
- Coosemans playing for RSC Anderlecht in 2024

Personal information
- Full name: Colin Maurice Coosemans
- Date of birth: 3 August 1992 (age 34)
- Place of birth: Ghent, Belgium
- Height: 1.86 m (6 ft 1 in)
- Position: Goalkeeper

Team information
- Current team: Anderlecht
- Number: 26

Youth career
- 1998–2000: Tenstar Melle
- 2000–2010: Club Brugge

Senior career*
Years	Team	Apps	(Gls)
2010–2012	Club Brugge	32	(0)
2012–2015	Waasland-Beveren	79	(0)
2015–2018	Mechelen	58	(0)
2018–2021	Gent	3	(0)
2021–	Anderlecht	85	(0)

International career^{‡}
2010–2011	Belgium U19	4	(0)
2012	Belgium U20	1	(0)
2011–2014	Belgium U21	10	(0)
- * Club domestic league appearances and goals as of 25 October 2026 ‡ National team caps and goals as of 10:17, 8 March 2014 (UTC)

Colin Maurice Coosemans (Dutch pronunciation: [ˈkoːlɪŋ ˈkoːsəˌmɑns]; born 3 August 1992) is a Belgian professional footballer who plays as a goalkeeper for Anderlecht.

== Career ==
Coosemans made his professional debut for Club Brugge on 30 September 2010 in a 2010–11 UEFA Europa League game against Villarreal. On 3 October 2010, he made his league debut against Gent. After his performances in early 2011, he was briefly nicknamed "The Magnet". However, after being replaced as first keeper by Bojan Jorgačević and two coach changes at Club Brugge, he was allowed to leave on loan to Waasland-Beveren during the 2012–13 season.

In 2017, he made a performance as a field player, attempting a dribble, losing a ball, recovering it and delivering a last minute assist in one of Belgium national league matches.

=== Waasland Beveren ===
In July 2012, Coosemans transferred to Waasland-Beveren. The transfer was for an undisclosed fee, and he signed a three-year contract. He made his debut for the club on 31 October 2012, in a 2–0 loss against KSC Lokeren. Over his time at Beveren, Coosemans made 80 appearances, establishing himself as a reliable goalkeeper.

=== Mechelen ===
Coosemans joined Mechelen in July 2015 after a successful stint at Waasland-Beveren. His debut for Mechelen came on 21 September 2016, in a Belgian Cup game against Sporting Hasselt, with the final score being a 3–2 victory for the Malinwa. During his time at Mechelen, Coosemans played 62 games, becoming a fan favourite for his consistent performances.

=== Gent ===
In August 2018, Coosemans moved to Gent, signing a contract that reflected his increasing stature. However, his debut for Gent was on 27 July 2018, when he played in a Belgian Pro League match against Standard Liège, which resulted in a 3–2 loss. He only made six appearances for Gent, playing primarily as a backup goalkeeper. He eventually left the club on a free transfer.

=== Anderlecht ===
On 26 May 2021, Coosemans signed a two-year contract at Anderlecht, after joining on a free transfer from Gent, initially signed by the club as a backup goalkeeper.

Coosemans had to wait a long time for his first-team debut, often serving as second or third choice behind Hendrik Van Crombrugge and Bart Verbruggen. Despite that, he remained a key presence in the dressing room—something that proved especially valuable for a young Anderlecht side under Vincent Kompany.

On 4 July 2023, he signed a new four-year deal until 2027.

In 2023, he also made 11 appearances for Anderlecht's U23 side, the RSCA Futures.

On 14 April 2024, he finally made his first team debut for the club against Cercle Brugge in a Belgian Pro League Champions’ Playoffs match, after replacing an injured Kasper Schmeichel at half time, who was the number 1 goalkeeper at that time. They won the match 3–0 at the Lotto Park with Coosemans making some decent saves. After making his debut, he gave an emotional speech in the dressing room, thanking everyone for his opportunity to play for the club.

He played two more games for Anderlecht in the Champions’ Playoffs, also against Cercle Brugge and against Antwerp.

Going into the 2024–2025 season, there where questions about who would be Anderlecht's replacement for Kasper Schmeichel, who left on a free transfer to Celtic FC. There remained lots of rumours, but the season began with Colin Coosemans as the number one. He impressed in pre-season, being very good and consistent in friendlies against VfL Wolfsburg and Sporting Braga. In the season opener against Sint-Truiden he again impressed, leading his side to a 1–0 victory. After again and again being the standout performer for Anderlecht the next few games, the fans and analysts started to doubt if a new number one was really necessary. On 17 August, after winning 3–1 away at Mechelen also getting the MOTM award, Coosemans stated in an interview he would try his very best to stay the number one goalkeeper, even if the club would bring in another goalkeeper.

On 22 August 2024, Coosemans made his return to the European competitions for the first time since 2020, in a UEFA Europa League qualifier against Dinamo Minsk, with a Man of the Match performance, winning 1–0.

At the end of the 2024–2025 season, where RSC Anderlecht ended in a disappointing 4th place, he was voted their Player of the Year, after arguably the best season ever in his career, attaining 17 clean sheets in the Belgian Pro League, and 22 in all competitions.

== Career statistics ==
As of 25 October 2026

Appearances and goals by club, season and competition
Club	Season	League			Belgian Cup		Continental		Other		Total	
Club	Season	Division	Apps	Goals	Apps	Goals	Apps	Goals	Apps	Goals	Apps	Goals
Club Brugge	2010–11	Belgian Pro League	19	0	1	0	1 (Note: Appearances in UEFA Europa League)	0	—		21	0
Club Brugge	2011–12	Belgian Pro League	13	0	2	0	7	0	—		22	0
Club Brugge	Total		32	0	3	0	8	0	—		43	0
Waasland-Beveren	2012–13	Belgian Pro League	24	0	1	0	—		—		25	0
Waasland-Beveren	2013–14	Belgian First Division	33	0	0	0	—		—		33	0
Waasland-Beveren	2014–15	Belgian Pro League	22	0	0	0	—		—		22	0
Waasland-Beveren	Total		79	0	1	0	—		—		80	0
Mechelen	2015–16	Belgian Pro League	0	0	0	0	—		—		0	0
Mechelen	2016–17	Belgian Pro League	28	0	2	0	—		—		30	0
Mechelen	2017–18	Belgian Pro League	30	0	2	0	—		—		32	0
Mechelen	Total		58	0	4	0	—		—		62	0
Gent	2018–19	Belgian Pro League	2	0	0	0	1	0	—		3	0
Gent	2019–20	Belgian Pro League	1	0	1	0	0	0	—		2	0
Gent	2020–21	Belgian Pro League	0	0	0	0	1	0	—		1	0
Gent	Total		3	0	1	0	2	0	—		6	0
Anderlecht	2021–22	Belgian Pro League	0	0	0	0	0	0	—		0	0
Anderlecht	2022–23	Belgian Pro League	0	0	0	0	0	0	—		0	0
Anderlecht	2023–24	Belgian Pro League	3	0	0	0	—		—		3	0
Anderlecht	2024–25	Belgian Pro League	35	0	5	0	11	0	—		51	0
Anderlecht	2025–26	Belgian Pro League	38	0	5	0	6 (Note: Two appearances in UEFA Europa League, four appearance in UEFA Conference League)	0	—		49	0
Anderlecht	2026–27	Belgian Pro League	9	0	0	0	9	0	—		18	0
Anderlecht	Total		85	0	10	0	27	0	—		121	0
Career total			257	0	19	0	37	0	0	0	312	0

== Honours ==
Anderlecht

- Belgian Cup runner-up: 2024–25

Individual

- Anderlecht Player of the Season: 2024–25
- Belgian Goalkeeper of the Year: 2025
