= Elisha Owusu =

Ghanaian-French footballer (born 1997)

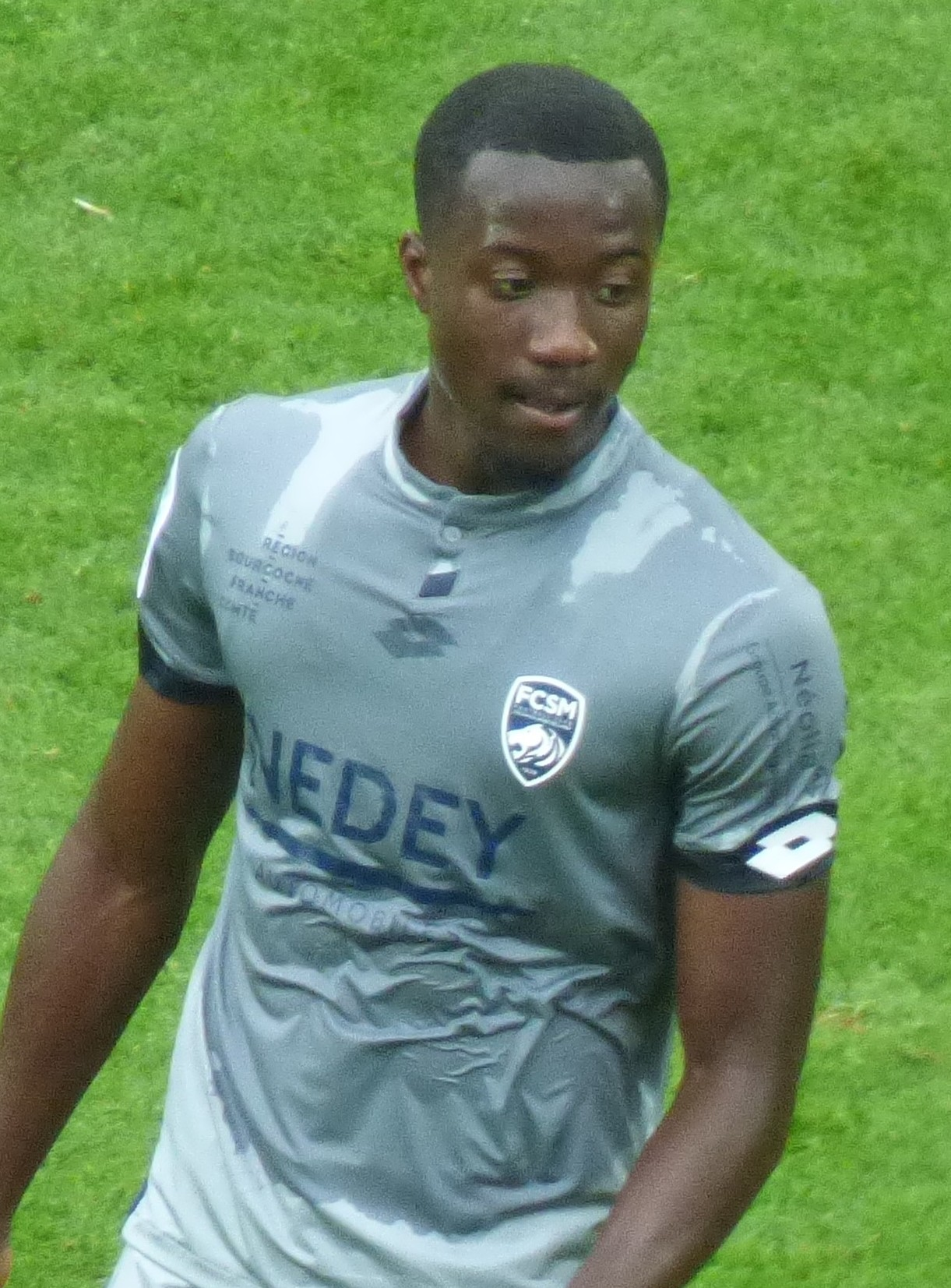
- Owusu with Sochaux in 2018

Personal information
- Full name: Elisha Owusu
- Date of birth: 7 November 1997 (age 29)
- Place of birth: Montreuil, France
- Height: 1.82 m (6 ft 0 in)
- Position: Midfielder

Team information
- Current team: Erzurumspor
- Number: 42

Youth career
- Bourgoin-Jallieu
- 2010–2017: Lyon

Senior career*
Years	Team	Apps	(Gls)
2015–2018	Lyon B	49	(2)
2017–2019	Lyon	0	(0)
2018–2019	→ Sochaux (loan)	33	(0)
2019–2023	Gent	84	(0)
2023–2026	Auxerre	90	(2)
2026–	Erzurumspor	3	(0)

International career^{‡}
2022–	Ghana	23	(0)
- * Club domestic league appearances and goals as of 5 September 2026 ‡ National team caps and goals as of 11:25, 4 July 2026 (UTC)

Elisha Owusu (born 7 November 1997) is a professional footballer who plays as a midfielder for Süper Lig club Erzurumspor in Turkey. Born in France, he plays for the Ghana national team.

== Club career ==
=== Lyon ===
Owusu is a youth product of Lyon, joining in 2010 and became the captain of their reserve side. On 23 February 2017, Owusu signed his first professional contract with Lyon for three years. On 19 June 2018, he was loaned for the season to Sochaux. He made his professional debut with Sochaux in a 1–0 Ligue 2 loss to Grenoble on 27 July 2018.

=== Gent ===
In June 2019, he transferred to Belgian club Gent for a fee of €1 million, with his former club retaining a 20% sell-on clause on any future transfer.

He made his Belgian First Division A debut on 28 July 2019, in the opening match of the league season against Charleroi, which ended in a 1–1 draw. He recorded his first league victory the following week, as Gent defeated Eupen 6–1. He also made his UEFA Europa League debut with the Belgian club, appearing in every match of their European campaign, from the qualifying rounds through to their elimination by AS Roma in the round of 32. After 29 league matches, having missed only two, he ranked among the top five midfielders in the league for ball recoveries.

=== Auxerre ===
On 16 January 2023, he signed with Ligue 1 side Auxerre on a contract running until June 2026 and was assigned the number 42 shirt.

He scored his first professional goal on 23 September 2023 against Troyes at the Stade de l'Aube. In June 2024, he extended his contract with the club until June 2027.

=== Erzurumspor ===
On 19 August 2026, Owusu signed a two-year contract with Erzurumspor in Turkey.

== International career ==
Born in France, Owusu is of Ghanaian descent. He debuted for the Ghana national team in a 1–1 2022 FIFA World Cup qualification tie with Nigeria on 29 March 2022. The result helped Ghana qualify for the 2022 FIFA World Cup.

On 31 December 2023, he was named in Ghana's 27-man squad selected by Chris Hughton for the 2023 Africa Cup of Nations. He took part in the team's second group-stage match against Egypt, coming on in the final minute of play, and Ghana was eliminated in the group stage.

On 2 June 2026, Owusu was integrated by Ghana's coach Carlos Queiroz into his list of 26 players in order to compete in the 2026 FIFA World Cup.

== Career statistics ==
=== Club ===
As of match played 23 August 2023

Appearances and goals by club, season and competition
Club	Season	League			National cup (Note: Includes Coupe de France, Belgian Cup)		League cup (Note: Includes Coupe de la Ligue)		Europe		Other		Total	
Club	Season	Division	Apps	Goals	Apps	Goals	Apps	Goals	Apps	Goals	Apps	Goals	Apps	Goals
Lyon B	2016–17	CFA	18	0	—		—		—		—		18	0
Lyon B	2017–18	National 2	25	1	—		—		—		—		25	1
Lyon B	Total		43	1	—		—		—		—		43	1
Sochaux (loan)	2018–19	Ligue 2	33	0	2	0	1	0	—		—		36	0
Gent	2019–20	Belgian Pro League	27	0	0	0	—		14 (Note: Appearance(s) in UEFA Europa League)	0	—		41	0
Gent	2020–21	Belgian Pro League	23	0	3	0	—		7 (Note: Three appearances in UEFA Champions League, four appearances in UEFA Europa League)	0	2 (Note: Appearance(s) in play-off)	0	35	0
Gent	2021–22	Belgian Pro League	18	0	4	0	—		8 (Note: Appearance(s) in UEFA Conference League)	0	5	0	35	0
Gent	2022–23	Belgian Pro League	9	0	2	0	—		4	0	—		15	0
Gent	Total		77	0	9	0	—		33	0	7	0	126	0
Auxerre	2022–23	Ligue 1	0	0	1	0	—		—		—		1	0
Career total			153	1	12	0	1	0	33	0	7	0	206	1

== Honours ==
Gent

- Belgian Cup: 2021–22

Auxerre

- Ligue 2: 2023–24
