= Michel Louwagie =

Belgian sports manager (born 1956)

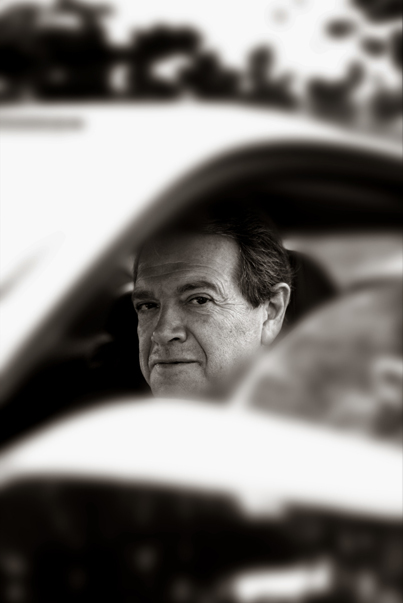
Michel Louwagie

Michel Louwagie (born 1 January 1956) was a Belgian sports manager. He was the manager and technical director of AA Gent. From 1998 until 2018, he was the president of the Belgian Swimming Federation.

He was born and brought up in Bruges and he was a youth player of Cercle Bruges. In 1978, he obtained the degree of Master in Physical Education. 1974, he was the Belgian champion on 100 metres backstroke. He was also the Belgian record holder 200 metres backstroke.

== Life ==
Louwagie played soccer until his thirteenth at Cercle Brugge. Later on, he was the president of the Belgian Swimming Federation, a title he re-obtained on 3. May 2014.

Later on, he started as a sports manager in football. 1990, he started as a trainee at AA Gent and had success. As a result, he was contracted permanently. As a sports manager, he was vice-champion in his first season and witnessed a peak in the team history, as KAA Gent reached the quarter-finals of the Uefa Cup in the 1992-93 UEFA Cup. After this, the club had a downfall, as it got in financial troubles.

Gent was almost bankrupt in those years, but when Ivan De Witte took over of Jean Van Milders, the team got rid of a debt mountain of 23 million euros (16.8 million pounds or 25 801 400 dollars). Louwagie discovered, among others, Bryan Ruiz, Roberto Rosales and Yassine El Ghanassy.

In 2013, he managed to move the team to the Ghelamco Arena, in which it got its first Championship in First Division in 2015. This meant that a season later, the team played Champions League in the 2015-2016-season.
