= Dino Arslanagić =

Belgian footballer

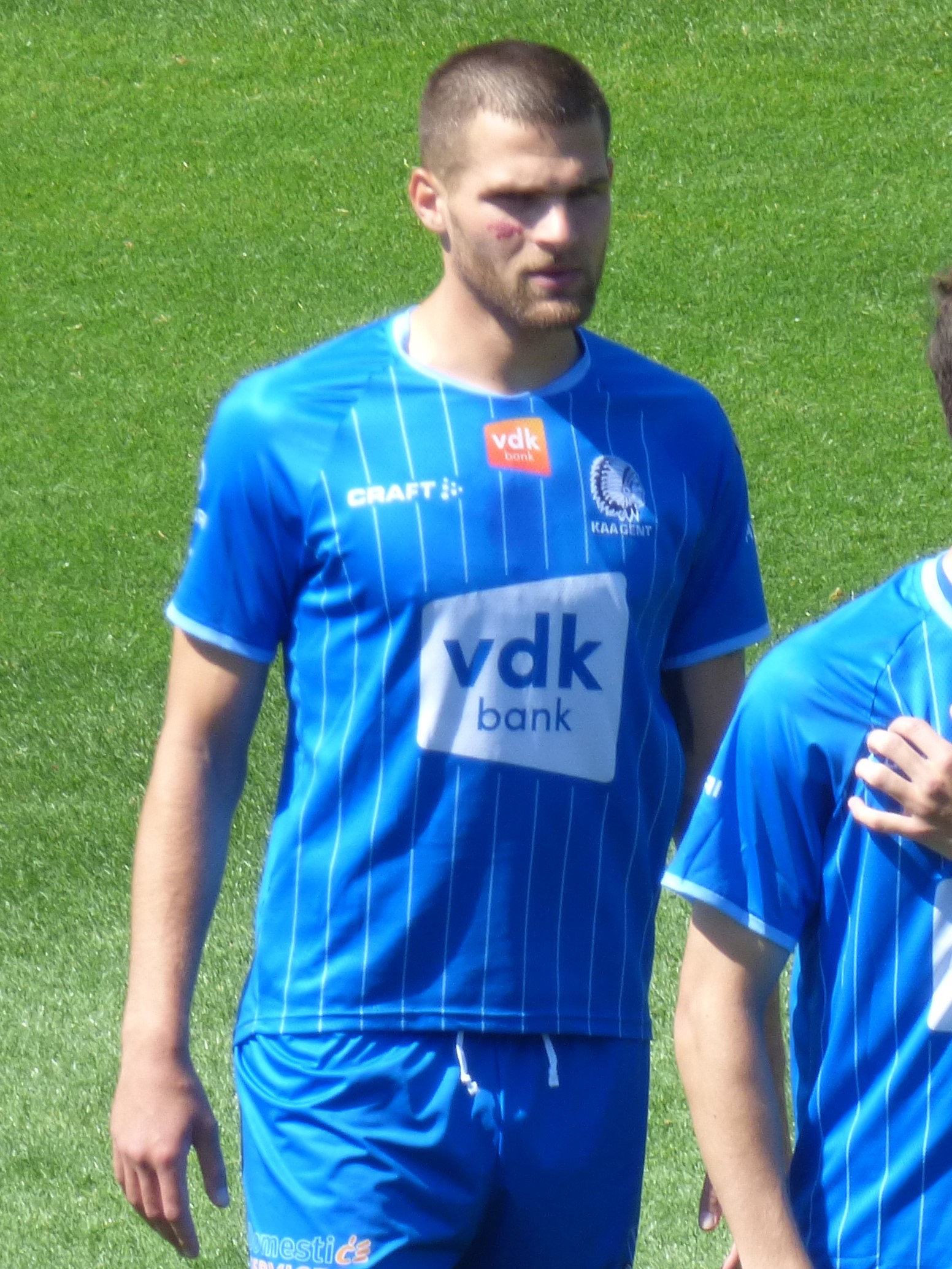
- Arslanagić with Gent in 2020

Personal information
- Date of birth: 24 April 1993 (age 33)
- Place of birth: Nivelles, Belgium
- Height: 1.91 m (6 ft 3 in)
- Position: Centre back

Team information
- Current team: Manisa
- Number: 15

Youth career
- 2000–2009: Mouscron
- 2009–2011: Lille
- 2011–2012: Standard Liège

Senior career*
Years	Team	Apps	(Gls)
2010	Lille II	1	(0)
2011–2017	Standard Liège	76	(4)
2017	Mouscron	18	(1)
2017–2020	Antwerp	76	(3)
2020–2021	Gent	16	(0)
2021–2023	Göztepe	63	(3)
2023	Hatta	0	(0)
2023–2024	Al-Riyadh	24	(0)
2024–2025	Macarthur FC	9	(0)
2025–	Manisa	16	(0)

International career^{‡}
2008	Belgium U15	2	(0)
2008–2009	Belgium U16	11	(0)
2008–2010	Belgium U17	8	(2)
2010–2012	Belgium U19	22	(3)
2012–2014	Belgium U21	12	(0)
- * Club domestic league appearances and goals as of 15 June 2025 ‡ National team caps and goals as of 5 March 2014

Dino Arslanagić (born 24 April 1993) is a Belgian professional footballer who plays as a centre back for Manisa. Born in Belgium, Arslanagić is of Bosnian descent.

Arslanagić started his professional career at Standard Liège, before joining Mouscron in 2017. Later that year, he moved to Antwerp. In 2020, he signed with Gent. In 2021, he joined Göztepe.

== Club career ==
=== Early career ===
On 19 May 2013, he scored his first professional goal against Lokeren.

In January 2017, he moved to Mouscron.

=== Gent ===
On 26 June 2020, Arslanagić joined Gent on a two-year contract.

=== Göztepe ===
On 5 July 2021, Arslanagić joined Göztepe on a two-year contract.

=== Hatta ===
On 4 July 2023, Arslanagić signed with UAE Pro League club Hatta.

=== Macarthur ===
On 16 September 2024, Arslanagić signed with Australian A-League Men club Macarthur. On 22 January 2025, Macarthur announced that Arslanagić had been released by the club due to "compassionate grounds". However, it was reported by Australian media that he had actually been sacked by the club after a drunken incident at a bar where he threatened to kill police on the morning of 19 December 2024. Arslanagić was convicted of being an excluded person who failed to leave the premises when required, intimidating a police officer in execution of their duty and resisting a police officer in execution of his duty and was fined $1500 as a result.

=== Manisa ===
Arslanagic signed for TFF 1. Lig Manisa on 25 January 2025.

== International career ==
Arslanagić represented Belgium on all youth levels.

== Career statistics ==
=== Club ===
As of match played 7 March 2020

Club	Season	League			Cup		Continental		Other		Total	
Club	Season	Division	Apps	Goals	Apps	Goals	Apps	Goals	Apps	Goals	Apps	Goals
Standard Liège	2012–13	Belgian First Division A	9	1	1	0	–		2 (Note: Appearances in 2012–13 Belgian Pro League play-offs for UEFA Europa League)	0	12	1
Standard Liège	2013–14	Belgian First Division A	17	0	2	0	10	0	–		29	0
Standard Liège	2014–15	Belgian First Division A	28	2	1	0	6	0	–		35	2
Standard Liège	2015–16	Belgian First Division A	21	1	3	1	0	0	–		24	2
Standard Liège	2016–17	Belgian First Division A	1	0	0	0	0	0	1 (Note: Appearance in 2016 Belgian Super Cup)	0	2	0
Standard Liège	Total		76	4	7	1	16	0	3	0	102	5
Mouscron	2016–17	Belgian First Division A	18	1	–		–		–		18	1
Antwerp	2017–18	Belgian First Division A	19	2	1	1	–		–		20	3
Antwerp	2018–19	Belgian First Division A	36	1	0	0	–		1 (Note: Appearance in 2018–19 Belgian First Division A play-offs for UEFA Europa League)	0	37	1
Antwerp	2019–20	Belgian First Division A	21	0	3	0	2	0	–		26	0
Antwerp	Total		76	3	4	1	2	0	1	0	83	4
Gent	2020–21	Belgian First Division A	0	0	0	0	0	0	0	0	0	0
Career total			170	8	11	2	18	0	4	0	203	10

== Honours ==
Standard Liège

- Belgian Cup: 2015–16
