= Jean Van Milders =

Belgian businessman

Jean Van Milders (13 November 1924 – 20 June 2011) was a Belgian businessman and the president of soccer team AA Gent during ten years.

== Business career ==
Born in Geel, Van Milders was a talented entrepreneur. He managed to develop the Brewery Van Milders situated in Geel, which he had inherited together with his brothers from his parents, to a sound company and he introduced the abbey beer Tongerlo. 1970, The brothers sold their brewery and started bottling Coca-Cola. As from 1976, they were catering Carestel-road restaurants.

Van Milders sometimes proclaimed very strange expressions about his entrepreneurial management. A good one-liner of his was: "As a child, what did we know about money? Nothing at all! And now, I've got grandchildren playing with their money on the stock markets."

== President of AA Gent ==
As from July 1988 to 1998, Van Milders was he president of AA Gent. This soccer team was just degraded out of Belgian First Division and the team had a heavy burden. Van Milders used his rich bank account to help the team financially.

In soccer, this meant a large difference at AA Gent. He transferred some well-known players to the team, making the way of playing more attractive. After a number of years, the team played European games again. In 1992, AA Gent reached the quarter-finals of the UEFA Cup. This was the best European result under his guidance. In the Belgian competition, it did not work out so well the next years, but the foundations of the successes were laid. Those were achieved under his successor Ivan De Witte.

Van Milders died in Knokke-Heist.
