= Anderson Niangbo =

Ivorian footballer

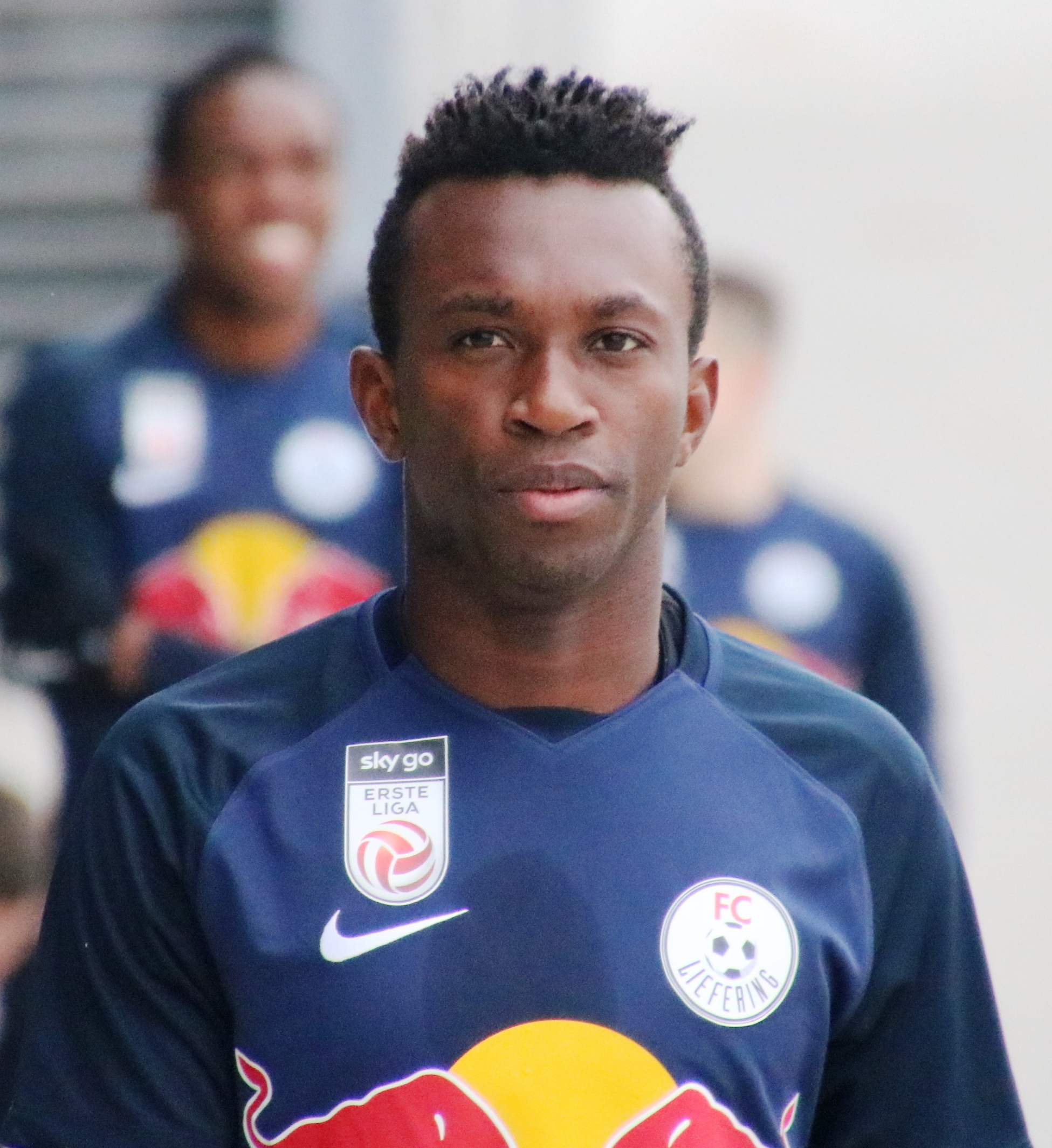

Personal information
- Full name: Dogbole Anderson Niangbo
- Date of birth: 6 October 1999 (age 27)
- Place of birth: Ouragahio, Ivory Coast
- Height: 1.72 m (5 ft 8 in)
- Position: Forward

Youth career
- Olympic Sport d'Abobo

Senior career*
| Years | Team | Apps | (Gls) |
| 2018–2020 | FC Liefering | 33 | (4) |
| 2019–2020 | → Wolfsberger AC (loan) | 17 | (7) |
| 2020 | Red Bull Salzburg | 0 | (0) |
| 2020–2024 | Gent | 25 | (4) |
| 2021–2022 | → Sturm Graz (loan) | 28 | (3) |
| 2023–2024 | → Aktobe (loan) | 19 | (3) |
| 2024 | Konyaspor | 1 | (0) |
| 2025 | Wolfsberger II | 6 | (0) |

International career
| 2013 | Ivory Coast U17 | 2 | (0) |
| 2015 | Ivory Coast U20 | 3 | (1) |
| 2013 | Ivory Coast U23 | 2 | (0) |
- * Club domestic league appearances and goals as of 23 May 2025

Anderson Niangbo (born 6 October 1999) is an Ivorian professional footballer.

== Career ==
=== Club career ===
Niangbo started his career at Olympic Sport d'Abobo. In January 2018 he moved to Austria for FC Red Bull Salzburg, where he received a contract that ran until June 2022, but where he was initially to be used for Salzburg's farm team, FC Liefering.

In March 2018 he made his debut for Liefering in the Austrian Football Second League when he was in the starting line-up against SV Ried on matchday 22 of the 2017–18 season and was replaced by Aldin Aganovic in the stoppage time. On 6 July 2019, Niangbo was loaned to Wolfsberger AC. After 17 appearances for the team in the Austrian Bundesliga, in which he scored seven goals, he was ordered back to Salzburg in January 2020 and initially moved up to the FC Red Bull Salzburg squad.

About a week after his return, he moved to Belgium to Gent, where he received a contract that ran until June 2024.

On 9 August 2021, he returned to Austria and joined Sturm Graz on a season-long loan.

In March 2023, joined Aktobe on a season-long loan.

On 8 February 2024, Niangbo moved to Konyaspor in Turkey until the end of the season.

On 6 February 2025, Niangbo returned to Wolfsberger AC.

== Career statistics ==
=== Club ===
As of 9 June 2024

| Club | Season | League | | | National Cup | | Continental | | Total | |
| Club | Season | Division | Apps | Goals | Apps | Goals | Apps | Goals | Apps | Goals |
|---|---|---|---|---|---|---|---|---|---|---|
| FC Liefering | 2017-18 | Second League | 15 | 1 | — | | — | | 15 | 1 |
| FC Liefering | 2018-19 | Second League | 18 | 3 | — | | — | | 18 | 3 |
| FC Liefering | Total | | 33 | 4 | — | | — | | 33 | 4 |
| Wolfsberger AC (loan) | 2019-20 | Austrian Bundesliga | 17 | 7 | 3 | 1 | 6 (Note: Appearance(s) in UEFA Europa League) | 0 | 26 | 8 |
| Gent | 2019-20 | Belgian Pro League | 7 | 3 | — | | 1 | 0 | 8 | 3 |
| Gent | 2020-21 | Belgian Pro League | 18 | 1 | 2 | 1 | 5 (Note: One appearance in UEFA Champions League, Four appearances in UEFA Europa League) | 0 | 25 | 2 |
| Gent | Total | | 25 | 4 | 2 | 1 | 6 | 0 | 33 | 5 |
| Sturm Graz (loan) | 2021-22 | Austrian Bundesliga | 28 | 3 | 2 | 0 | 8 | 0 | 38 | 3 |
| Gent II | 2022-23 | Belgian National Division 1 | 7 | 0 | — | | — | | 7 | 0 |
| Aktobe (loan) | 2023 | Kazakhstan Premier League | 19 | 3 | 2 | 0 | 2 (Note: Appearance(s) in UEFA Champions League) | 0 | 23 | 3 |
| Konyaspor | 2023-24 | Süper Lig | 1 | 0 | 1 | 0 | — | | 2 | 0 |
| Career Total | | | 130 | 21 | 10 | 2 | 22 | 0 | 162 | 23 |

== Honours ==
Ivory Coast U23

- Africa U-23 Cup of Nations runner-up:2019
