= Ivan De Witte =

Ivan De Witte (Moortsele, 1947) is a Belgian entrepreneur and soccer executive. As of June 2015, he is CEO of the Belgian department of the HR company Hudson Benelux. Since 1999, he is also the director of football team AA Gent.

== Biography ==
Ivan De Witte was born in 1947 in the Moortsele. His parents were the owners of a charcuterie house. Later on, the family moved to Merelbeke. De Witte studied classical studies at the Sint-Lievenscollege in Ghent and got a certificate in business psychology at the Ghent University. Once he finished his studies, he worked a year as an assistant of the university. Since his teens, De Witte has played soccer at the amateur level.

== Career ==
=== Entrepreneur and businessman ===
De Witte served on the board of directors of the Ghent steel company Sidmar for ten years, during which he met fellow worker Maarten Morel. In 1982, they left Sidmar and founded De Witte & Morel, a company that was specialised in human resources management. In 1995, the consultancy company was acquired as a subsidiary by Ernst & Young. De Witte remained delegate director in the new organisational structure of the Ghent company. Six years later, De Witte & Morel was sold to TMP Worldwide. In 2003, the company merged with the American group Hudson Highland. Five years later, it changed its name to Hudson Belgium. Since 2008, De Witte has been CEO of Hudson Benelux.

=== Soccer executive ===
De Witte started as a managing director of the football team AA Gent during the 1990s. In advance of the 1999/2000-season, he succeeded Jean Van Milders as president of the team. Together with manager Michel Louwagie, he worked to resolve AA Gent's €23 million debt, succeeding in January 2013. Two years earlier, the team had started the building of a new stadium. As from the season 2013/14, AA Gent plays in the modern Ghelamco Arena.

In 2007, De Witte was also the president of the Pro League, succeeding Jean-Marie Philips. In the time De Witte was president, the Belgian competition was renamed in Jupiler Pro League and play-offs were set up. De Witte left the Pro League in 2011 and was succeeded by Ronny Verhelst.
