= 2023–24 KAA Gent season =

KAA Gent
2023–24 season
- Manager: Hein Vanhaezebrouck
- Stadium: Ghelamco Arena
- Belgian Pro League: 7th
- Europe play-offs: 1st
- Belgian Cup: Quarter-finals
- UEFA Europa Conference League: Knockout round play-offs
- Top goalscorer: League: Tarik Tissoudali (15); All: Tarik Tissoudali (21)
- Average home league attendance: 14,563

The 2023–24 season was KAA Gent's 124th season in existence and 35th consecutive in the Belgian Pro League. They were also competing in the Belgian Cup and the UEFA Europa Conference League.

== Players ==
=== First-team squad ===
As of 8 February 2024

Note: Flags indicate national team as defined under FIFA eligibility rules; some limited exceptions apply. Players may hold more than one non-FIFA nationality.

No.	Pos.	Nation	Player
1	GK	FRA	Paul Nardi
3	DF	ENG	Archie Brown
4	DF	JPN	Tsuyoshi Watanabe
5	DF	MAR	Ismaël Kandouss
6	MF	ISR	Omri Gandelman
7	MF	KOR	Hong Hyun-seok
8	MF	BEL	Pieter Gerkens
9	FW	SWE	Momodou Sonko
10	FW	MAR	Tarik Tissoudali
12	DF	CAF	Hugo Gambor
13	MF	BEL	Julien De Sart
14	MF	JPN	Daisuke Yokota
16	GK	JPN	Daniel Schmidt
17	MF	DEN	Andrew Hjulsager

No.	Pos.	Nation	Player
18	MF	BEL	Matisse Samoise
19	FW	SUI	Franck Surdez
20	DF	SRB	Stefan Mitrović
21	DF	CMR	Brian Agbor
22	DF	SEN	Noah Fadiga
23	DF	NGR	Jordan Torunarigha
24	MF	BEL	Sven Kums (captain)
25	DF	ANG	Núrio Fortuna
26	GK	BEL	Louis Fortin
28	FW	BEL	Matias Fernandez-Pardo
29	FW	BEL	Laurent Depoitre
30	GK	BEL	Célestin De Schrevel
33	GK	BEL	Davy Roef

==== Out on loan ====
Note: Flags indicate national team as defined under FIFA eligibility rules; some limited exceptions apply. Players may hold more than one non-FIFA nationality.

No. / Pos. / Nation / Player; — / DF / BEL / Bram Lagae (at Dunkerque until 30 June 2024)	No. / Pos. / Nation / Player; — / MF / AUS / Keegan Jelacic (at Brisbane Roar until 30 June 2024)

== Transfers ==
=== In ===
Pos.	Player	Transferred from	Fee	Date	Source
DF	(Japan) Tsuyoshi Watanabe	(Belgium) Kortrijk	€3,500,000	1 July 2023	
MF	(Australia) Keegan Jelacic	(Australia) Perth Glory	€180,000	1 July 2023	
DF	(Morocco) Ismaël Kandouss	(Belgium) Union Saint-Gilloise	€1,750,000	12 July 2023	

=== Out ===
Pos.	Player	Transferred to	Fee	Date	Source
DF	(Kenya) Joseph Okumu	(France) Reims	€12,000,000	22 July 2023	

== Pre-season and friendlies ==
Win Draw Loss Fixtures

30 June 2023 Friendly	KFC Merelbeke (Belgium)	1–9	(Belgium) Gent
19:00 UTC+2

8 July 2023 Friendly	Lokomotiva Zagreb (Croatia)	2–1	(Belgium) Gent
14:00 UTC+2

12 July 2023 Friendly	Utrecht (Netherlands)	0–2	(Belgium) Gent
17:30 UTC+2		Report

15 July 2023 Friendly	Volendam (Netherlands)	1–2	(Belgium) Gent	Alkmaar, Netherlands
13:30 UTC+2		Report		Stadium: Sportpark Overdie

19 July 2023 Friendly	Gent (Belgium)	4–2	(Belgium) Zulte Waregem
19:00 UTC+2		Report
Note: Match was played in two 60-minute periods.

21 July 2023 Friendly	Gent (Belgium)	2–2	(South Africa) Mamelodi Sundowns	Bruges
13:45 UTC+2	Orban	Report		Stadium: Jan Breydel Stadium

22 July 2023 Friendly	Gent (Belgium)	v	(Ukraine) Shakhtar Donetsk	Bruges
14:00 UTC+2				Stadium: Jan Breydel Stadium

== Competitions ==
=== Overall record ===
Competition	First match	Last match	Starting round	Final position	Record							
Competition	First match	Last match	Starting round	Final position	Pld	W	D	L	GF	GA	GD	Win %
Belgian Pro League Regular season	30 July 2023	17 April 2024	Matchday 1	7th	30	12	11	7	53	38	+15	40.00
Europe Play-offs	29 March 2024	25 May 2024	Matchday 1	1st	10	8	0	2	27	10	+17	80.00
Europe Play-offs	2 June 2024		Final	Winners	1	1	0	0	1	0	+1	100.00
Belgian Cup	1 November 2023	16 January 2024	Seventh round	Quarter-finals	3	2	0	1	4	2	+2	66.67
UEFA Europa Conference League	27 July 2023	21 February 2024	Second qualifying round	Knockout round play-offs	14	9	2	3	37	15	+22	64.29
Total					58	32	13	13	122	65	+57	55.17

Source: Soccerway

=== Belgian Pro League ===
==== League table ====
Pos	Team	Pld	W	D	L	GF	GA	GD	Pts	Qualification or relegation
5	Cercle Brugge	30	14	5	11	44	34	+10	47	Qualification for the champions' play-offs
6	Genk	30	12	11	7	51	31	+20	47	Qualification for the champions' play-offs
7	Gent	30	12	11	7	53	38	+15	47	Qualification for the Europe play-offs
8	Mechelen	30	13	6	11	39	34	+5	45	Qualification for the Europe play-offs
9	Sint-Truiden	30	10	10	10	35	46	−11	40	Qualification for the Europe play-offs

Source: Jupiler Pro League (in Dutch), Soccerway
Rules for classification: 1) Points; 2) Matches won; 3) Goal difference; 4) Goals scored; 5) Away matches won; 6) Away goal difference; 7) Away goals scored; 8) Play-off.

==== Results summary ====
Overall								Home						Away					
Pld	W	D	L	GF	GA	GD	Pts	W	D	L	GF	GA	GD	W	D	L	GF	GA	GD
30	12	11	7	53	38	+15	47	7	6	2	34	18	+16	5	5	5	19	20	−1

Source: Worldfootball

==== Results by round ====
Round	1	2	3	4	5	6	7	8	9	10	11	12	13	14	15	16	17	18	19	20	21	22	23	24	25	26	27	28	29	30
Ground	H	A	A	H	A	H	A	H	A	H	A	H	A	H	H	A	H	A	H	A	H	H	A	A	H	A	H	A	A	H
Result	W	W	W	D	D	W	D	W	D	D	L	W	W	D	D	D	W	L	W	W	L	D	L	L	L	W	D	L	D	W
Position	5	3	2	2	4	1	1	1	2	3	3	3	3	3	3	3	3	3	3	3	3	4	4	5	6	5	7	7	8	7

Source: Worldfootball
A = Away; H = Home; W = Win; D = Draw; L = Loss

==== Matches ====
The league fixtures were unveiled on 22 June 2023.

30 July 2023 1	Gent	3–2	Kortrijk	Ghent
16:00 UTC+2	Radovanović 8' (o.g.); Castro-Montes (yellow card) 24'; Cuypers 30'; Orban 71'	Report	Kadri 5'; Montegnies (yellow card) 30'; Mehssatou (yellow card) 56'; Avenatti (yellow card) 40', (goal) 86'; João Silva (yellow card) 90+5'	Stadium: Ghelamco Arena; Attendance: 12,595; Referee: Lawrence Visser

6 August 2023 2	Mechelen	0–1	Gent	Mechelen
16:00 UTC+2	Belghali (yellow card) 35'; Hairemans (yellow card) 90+1'; Schoofs (penalty missed) 90+5'	Report	Lavalée 54' (o.g.); Cuypers (yellow card) 65'; Hjulsager (yellow card) 66'; Fortuna (yellow card) 85'	Stadium: AFAS Stadion; Attendance: 11,234; Referee: Nicolas Laforge

13 August 2023 3	Westerlo	1–3	Gent	Westerlo
19:15 UTC+2	Madsen 18' (pen.); Fixelles (yellow card) 67'	Report	Watanabe 35'; Cuypers 60', 74' (pen.); De Sart (yellow card) 69'	Stadium: Het Kuipje; Attendance: 6,000; Referee: Wesli De Cremer

20 August 2023 4	Gent	2–2	Sint-Truiden	Ghent
16:00 UTC+2	De Sart (yellow card) 21'; Orban 35'; Torunarigha 58'; Samoise (yellow card) 61'	Report	Koita 7'; Delorge-Knieper 13'; Godeau (yellow card) 54'; Bocat (yellow card) 60'	Stadium: Ghelamco Arena; Referee: Erik Lambrechts

27 September 2023 5	Antwerp	0–0	Gent	Antwerp
20:45 CEST (UTC+2)	Muja (yellow card) 44'; Kerk (yellow card) 45'; Ekkelenkamp (yellow card) 82'		Torunarigha (yellow card) 54'	Stadium: Bosuilstadion; Attendance: 13,077; Referee: Nicolas Laforge
Note: The match scheduled for 26 August 2023 was postponed due to the UEFA Champions League play-offs.

3 September 2023 6	Gent	2–1	Club Brugge	Ghent
13:30 CEST (UTC+2)	Hong 25', 49'; Fadiga (yellow card) 79' (yellow-red card) 82'	Report	Vanaken 43'	Stadium: Ghelamco Arena; Attendance: 19,507; Referee: Jasper Vergoote

24 September 2023 8	Gent	2–1	Eupen	Ghent
19:15 CEST (UTC+2)	Kums 49'; Tissoudali 58'	Report	Pantović 28'	Stadium: Ghelamco Arena; Referee: Jan Boterberg

22 October 2023 11	Cercle Brugge	2–0	Gent	Bruges
16:00				Stadium: Jan Breydel Stadium

29 October 2023 12	Gent	3–1	Standard Liège	Liège
18:30 CEST	Torunarigha (yellow card) 27'; Tissoudali 33' 40'; Cuypers 36'; Samoise (yellow card) 80'	Report	Vanheusden (yellow card) 47'; Hayden (yellow card) 52'; Kanga 67'	Stadium: Stade Maurice Dufrasne; Attendance: 16,679; Referee: (Belgium) Nicolas Laforge

5 November 2023 13	Charleroi	1–3	Gent	Charleroi
19:15				Stadium: Stade du Pays de Charleroi

12 November 2023 14	Gent	1–1	Anderlecht	Ghent
18:30 CET (UTC+1)				Stadium: Ghelamco Arena

26 November 2023 15	Gent	1–1	Union Saint-Gilloise	Ghent
13:30 CET	Kums (yellow card) 43'; Fofana (yellow card) 43'; De Sart 45+3' (pen.)		Amoura (yellow card) 4'; Puertas 55'; Nilsson (yellow card) 66'; Lapoussin (yellow card) 88'	Stadium: Ghelamco Arena; Attendance: 18,007

3 December 2023 16	Genk	2–2	Gent	Genk
13:30 CET (UTC+1)	Sor 21', 51', (yellow card) 73'; Fadera (yellow card) 66'		Tissoudali 12', 90+9'; Kums (yellow card) 57'; Fortuna (yellow card) 71'	Stadium: Cegeka Arena; Attendance: 18,319; Referee: Nicolas Laforge

17 December 2023 18	Club Brugge	2–0	Gent	Bruges
13:30 CET (UTC+1)	Thiago 24' (pen.), 41' (pen.)	Report	Kandouss (red card) 40'	Stadium: Jan Breydel Stadium; Referee: Jonathan Lardot

21 December 2023 19	Gent	4–0	OH Leuven	Ghent
20:45 CET (UTC+1)	Samoise 4'; Fofane 57'; Cuypers 65'; Watanabe 69'			Stadium: Ghelamco Arena

27 January 2024 22	Gent	2–2	Westerlo	Ghent
20:45				Stadium: Ghelamco Arena

11 February 2024 25	Gent	1–2	Cercle Brugge	Ghent
		Report		Stadium: Ghelamco Arena

18 February 2024 26	Eupen	0–2	Gent	Eupen
		Report

25 February 2024 27	Gent	2–2	Antwerp	Ghent
16:00 CET (UTC+1)				Stadium: Ghelamco Arena

2 March 2024 28	Standard Liège	4–2	Gent	Liège
		Report

10 March 2024 29	Union Saint-Gilloise	1–1	Gent	Brussels
18:30 CET		Report		Stadium: Joseph Marien Stadium

17 March 2024 30	Gent	5–0	Charleroi	Ghent
18:30	Fernandez-Pardo 38'; Gandelman 41', 48', 55', 67'	Report		Stadium: Ghelamco Arena; Referee: Jan Boterberg

==== Results summary ====
Overall								Home						Away					
Pld	W	D	L	GF	GA	GD	Pts	W	D	L	GF	GA	GD	W	D	L	GF	GA	GD
10	8	0	2	27	10	+17	24	4	0	1	13	5	+8	4	0	1	14	5	+9

Source: Worldfootball

==== Results by round ====
Round	1	2	3	4	5	6	7	8	9	10
Ground	H	A	A	H	A	H	A	H	A	H
Result	W	W	L	W	W	W	W	L	W	W
Position	1	1	1	1	1	1	1	1	1	1

Source: Worldfootball
A = Away; H = Home; W = Win; D = Draw; L = Loss

==== Matches ====
29 March 2024 1	Gent	5–1	Standard Liège	Ghent
20:45	Fernandez-Pardo 23'; Gandelman 53'; Gerkens 72'; Kandouss 79'; Tissoudali 83'	Report	De Sart 28' (o.g.)	Stadium: Ghelamco Arena; Attendance: 11,341; Referee: Nathan Verboomen

7 April 2024 2	Westerlo	0–3	Gent	Westerlo
19:15		Report		Stadium: Het Kuipje

14 April 2024 3	OH Leuven	2–1	Gent	Leuven
19:15		Report		Stadium: Den Dreef

20 April 2024 4	Gent	3–1	Mechelen	Gent
		Report		Stadium: Planet Group Arena

23 April 2024 5	Sint-Truiden	0–2	Gent	Sint-Truiden
		Report		Stadium: Stayen

27 April 2024 6	Gent	3–2	Westerlo	Gent
		Report		Stadium: Planet Group Arena

4 May 2024 7	Mechelen	2–4	Gent	Mechelen
		Report		Stadium: AFAS Stadion

12 May 2024 8	Gent	0–1	OH Leuven	Gent
		Report		Stadium: Planet Group Arena

18 May 2024 9	Standard Liège	1–4	Gent	Liège
20:45	Yeboah 17'	Report	Fernandez-Pardo 10', 66'; Depoitre 80', 87'	Stadium: Stade Maurice Dufrasne; Referee: Kevin Van Damme

25 May 2024 10	Gent	2–0	Sint-Truiden	Gent
20:30		Report		Stadium: Planet Group Arena; Referee: Matonga Simonini

==== European competition play-off ====
2 June 2024	Genk	0–1	Gent	Genk
13:30		Report	Hjulsager 60'	Stadium: Cegeka Arena

=== Belgian Cup ===
1 November 2023 Seventh round	Patro Eisden Maasmechelen	1–3	Gent	Maasmechelen
19:00 CET	Hadj-Moussa 46'	Report	Tissoudali 29'; Hong 77'; Kums 81'	Stadium: Gemeentelijk Sportparkstadion Maasmechelen

6 December 2023 Eighth round	Sint-Truiden	0–1	Gent	Sint-Truiden
20:30 CET		Report	Cuypers 39'	Stadium: Stayen; Attendance: 4,500; Referee: Erik Lambrechts

16 January 2024 Quarter-finals	Gent	0–1	Club Brugge	Ghent
20:45 CET		Report	Thiago 17'	Stadium: Ghelamco Arena; Attendance: 17,897; Referee: Erik Lambrechts

=== UEFA Europa Conference League ===
==== Second qualifying round ====
The draw for the second qualifying round was made on 21 June 2023.

27 July 2023 First leg	Gent (Belgium)	5–1	(Slovakia) Žilina	Ghent
20:00 UTC+2	Orban 23'; De Sart 55'; Cuypers 66', 85'; Watanabe 76'	Report	Gidi (yellow card) 54'; Javorček (yellow card) 68' (yellow-red card) 73'; Kaprálik 79'	Stadium: Ghelamco Arena; Attendance: 8,904; Referee: Visar Kastrati (Kosovo)

3 August 2023 Second leg	Žilina (Slovakia)	2–5 (3–10 agg.)	(Belgium) Gent	Žilina, Slovakia
20:00 UTC+2	Rusnák (yellow card) 56'; Minárik (yellow card) 58'; Kaprálik (yellow card) 28', (goal) 66'; Bari 77'; Nemčík (yellow card) 90+3'	Report	Hjulsager 30'; Cuypers 62', 89'; Tissoudali 69'; Gerkens 72'	Stadium: Štadión pod Dubňom; Attendance: 6,224; Referee: Dumitri Muntean (Moldova)

==== Third qualifying round ====
The draw for the third qualifying round was held on 24 July 2023.

9 August 2023 First leg	Gent (Belgium)	5–0	(Poland) Pogoń Szczecin	Ghent
20:00 UTC+2	Orban 13', 35', 64'; Cuypers 40', 45+1'; Torunarigha (yellow card) 41'	Report	Malec (yellow card) 29'; Gamboa (yellow card) 80'	Stadium: Ghelamco Arena; Attendance: 11,326; Referee: Vassilis Fotias (Greece)

17 August 2023 Second leg	Pogoń Szczecin (Poland)	2–1 (2–6 agg.)	(Belgium) Gent	Szczecin, Poland
18:00 UTC+2	Lončar (yellow card) 28'; Koulouris 79', 86'; Fornalczyk (yellow card) 82'	Report	Cuypers 90+5'	Stadium: Stadion Miejski im. Floriana Krygiera; Attendance: 11,549; Referee: Ruddy Buquet (France)

==== Play-off round ====
The draw for the play-off round was held on 7 August 2023.

24 August 2023 First leg	Gent (Belgium)	2–0	(Cyprus) APOEL	Ghent
20:00 UTC+2	Kandouss (yellow card) 29'; Orban (yellow card) 34'; Fofana 77'; Hong 90+2'	Report	Chebake (yellow card) 19'; Kvilitaia (yellow card) 39'	Stadium: Ghelamco Arena; Attendance: 10,855; Referee: Sven Jablonski (Germany)

31 August 2023 Second leg	APOEL (Cyprus)	1–2 (1–4 agg.)	(Belgium) Gent	Nicosia, Cyprus
20:00 UTC+3	Dálcio (yellow card) 26'; Chebake (yellow card) 29'; Petrović (yellow card) 90+2'; Roef 90+5' (o.g.)	Report	Samoise 28'; Orban (yellow card) 33'; Kandouss (yellow card) 72'; Tissoudali 79'	Stadium: GSP Stadium; Attendance: 14,100; Referee: Rohit Saggi (Norway)

==== Group stage ====
The draw for the group stage was held on 1 September 2023.

Pos	Team	Pld	W	D	L	GF	GA	GD	Pts	Qualification	MTA	GNT	ZOR	BRE
1	(Israel) Maccabi Tel Aviv	6	5	0	1	14	9	+5	15	Advance to round of 16	—	3–1	3–2	3–2
2	(Belgium) Gent	6	4	1	1	16	7	+9	13	Advance to knockout round play-offs	2–0	—	4–1	5–0
3	(Ukraine) Zorya Luhansk	6	2	1	3	10	11	−1	7		1–3	1–1	—	4–0
4	(Iceland) Breiðablik	6	0	0	6	5	18	−13	0		1–2	2–3	0–1	—

Source: UEFA
Rules for classification: Group stage tiebreakers

21 September 2023 1	Zorya Luhansk (Ukraine)	1–1	(Belgium) Gent	Lublin, Poland
21:00	Guerrero 70'	Report	Cuypers 67'	Stadium: Arena Lublin; Attendance: 539; Referee: Daniele Chiffi (Italy)
Note: Due to the Russian invasion of Ukraine, Ukrainian teams were required to play their home matches at neutral venues until further notice.

5 October 2023 2	Gent (Belgium)	2–0	(Israel) Maccabi Tel Aviv	Ghent
18:45	Tissoudali 39', 90+2' (pen.)	Report		Stadium: Ghelamco Arena; Attendance: 10,503; Referee: Abdulkadir Bitigen (Turkey)

26 October 2023 3	Gent (Belgium)	5–0	(Iceland) Breiðablik	Ghent
18:45	Gandelman 10'; Cuypers 15', 19'; Tissoudali 43'; Orban 69'	Report		Stadium: Ghelamco Arena; Attendance: 9,907; Referee: Robertas Valikonis (Lithuania)

9 November 2023 4	Breiðablik (Iceland)	2–3	(Belgium) Gent	Reykjavík, Iceland
21:00 (20:00 WET)	Svanþórsson 16', 18'	Report	Orban 6', 54' (pen.), 69'	Stadium: Laugardalsvöllur; Attendance: 1,211; Referee: Julian Weinberger (Austria)
Note: Breiðablik played their first two home matches at the Laugardalsvöllur, in Reykjavík, instead of their regular stadium, Kópavogsvöllur, in Kópavogur, which did not meet UEFA requirements.

30 November 2023 5	Gent (Belgium)	4–1	(Ukraine) Zorya Luhansk	Ghent
18:45	Fofana 20'; Batahov 49' (o.g.); Orban 55'; Gandelman 75'	Report	Nahnoinyi 82'	Stadium: Ghelamco Arena; Attendance: 10,303; Referee: Evangelos Manouchos (Greece)

14 December 2023 6	Maccabi Tel Aviv (Israel)	3–1	(Belgium) Gent	Bačka Topola, Serbia
21:00	Kanichowsky 9'; Zahavi 24', 61'	Report	De Sart 49'	Stadium: TSC Arena; Attendance: 0 (Note: The match was played behind closed doors.); Referee: Jesús Gil Manzano (Spain)
Note: Due to the Gaza war, Maccabi Tel Aviv played their remaining home matches at a neutral venue.

==== Knockout round play-offs ====
15 February 2024 First leg	Maccabi Haifa (Israel)	1–0	(Belgium) Gent	Budapest, Hungary
21:00	Kandil (yellow card) 57'; Pierrot 65'; Feingold (yellow card) 76'	Report	De Sart (yellow card) 90+3'	Stadium: Bozsik Aréna; Attendance: 1,274; Referee: Willie Collum (SCO)
Note: Due to the Gaza war, Maccabi Haifa played their home matches at a neutral venue.

21 February 2024 Second leg	Gent (Belgium)	1–1 (1–2 agg.)	(Israel) Maccabi Haifa	Ghent
18:00	Seck 69' (o.g.)	Report	Pierrot 4'	Stadium: Ghelamco Arena; Attendance: 60; Referee: Matej Jug (Slovenia)
Note: Due to anticipated Gaza war protests, no spectators were allowed to the Gent v Maccabi Haifa match.
