= 2021–22 KAA Gent season =

Gent
2021–22 season
- Chairman: Ivan De Witte
- Managing director: Michel Louwagie
- Manager: Hein Vanhaezebrouck
- Stadium: Ghelamco Arena
- First Division A: 5th
- Belgian Cup: Winners
- UEFA Europa Conference League: Round of 16
- Top goalscorer: League: Tarik Tissoudali (20); All: Tarik Tissoudali (26)
| Home colours | Away colours |

The 2021–22 season was the 119th season in the existence of KAA Gent and the club's 33rd consecutive season in the top flight of Belgian football. In addition to the domestic league, Gent participated in this season's editions of the Belgian Cup and the UEFA Europa Conference League.

== Players ==
=== First-team squad ===
As of 22 February 2022

Note: Flags indicate national team as defined under FIFA eligibility rules; some limited exceptions apply. Players may hold more than one non-FIFA nationality.

| No. | Pos. | Nation | Player |
|---|---|---|---|
| 1 | GK | TUR | Sinan Bolat |
| 2 | DF | KEN | Joseph Okumu |
| 3 | DF | CIV | Christopher Opéri |
| 5 | DF | CMR | Michael Ngadeu-Ngadjui |
| 6 | MF | GHA | Elisha Owusu |
| 8 | MF | BEL | Vadis Odjidja-Ofoe (captain) |
| 9 | MF | UKR | Roman Bezus |
| 11 | FW | SRB | Darko Lemajić |
| 13 | MF | BEL | Julien De Sart |
| 14 | DF | BEL | Alessio Castro-Montes |
| 15 | MF | NGR | Adewale Oladoye |
| 16 | FW | NGR | Chinonso Emeka |
| 17 | MF | DEN | Andrew Hjulsager |
| 18 | MF | BEL | Matisse Samoise |
| 19 | FW | BEL | Gianni Bruno |

| No. | Pos. | Nation | Player |
|---|---|---|---|
| 20 | DF | GER | Jordan Torunarigha (on loan from Hertha BSC) |
| 21 | DF | NOR | Andreas Hanche-Olsen |
| 22 | MF | GAM | Sulayman Marreh |
| 23 | FW | ISR | Yonas Malede |
| 24 | MF | BEL | Sven Kums (vice-captain) |
| 25 | DF | ANG | Núrio Fortuna |
| 26 | GK | BEL | Louis Fortin |
| 28 | MF | BEL | Wouter George |
| 29 | FW | BEL | Laurent Depoitre |
| 31 | DF | BEL | Bruno Godeau |
| 33 | GK | BEL | Davy Roef |
| 34 | FW | MAR | Tarik Tissoudali |
| 35 | DF | BEL | Cederic Van Daele |
| 43 | DF | MLI | Ibrahima Cissé |
| 44 | GK | BEL | René Vanden Borre |

==== Other players under contract ====
Note: Flags indicate national team as defined under FIFA eligibility rules; some limited exceptions apply. Players may hold more than one non-FIFA nationality.

| No. | Pos. | Nation | Player |

==== Out on loan ====
Note: Flags indicate national team as defined under FIFA eligibility rules; some limited exceptions apply. Players may hold more than one non-FIFA nationality.

| No. | Pos. | Nation | Player |
|---|---|---|---|
| 10 | MF | GEO | Giorgi Chakvetadze (on loan at Hamburg until 30 June 2022) |
| 11 | FW | CIV | Anderson Niangbo (on loan at Sturm Graz until 30 June 2022) |
| 20 | FW | GHA | Osman Bukari (on loan at Nantes until 30 June 2022) |

| No. | Pos. | Nation | Player |
|---|---|---|---|
| — | FW | CIV | Vakoun Issouf Bayo (on loan at Charleroi until 30 June 2022) |
| — | FW | COD | Jordan Botaka (on loan at Fortuna Sittard until 30 June 2022) |

== Transfers ==
| Date | Name | Moving from | Moving to | Fee | Note |
|---|---|---|---|---|---|
| 1 July 2021 | Louis Fortin | Standard Liège | KAA Gent | Free | |
| 1 July 2021 | Julien De Sart | KV Kortrijk | KAA Gent | Free | |
| 1 July 2021 | (Denmark) Andrew Hjulsager | KV Oostende | KAA Gent | Undisclosed | |
| 1 July 2021 | (France) Christopher Operi | (France) LB Châteauroux | KAA Gent | Undisclosed | |
| 1 July 2021 | Colin Coosemans | KAA Gent | RSC Anderlecht | Free | |
| 1 July 2021 | (Kenya) Joseph Okumu | (Sweden) IF Elfsborg | KAA Gent | Undisclosed | |
| 5 July 2021 | Dino Arslanagić | KAA Gent | (Turkey) Göztepe S.K. | Undisclosed | |
| 6 July 2021 | (Croatia) Franko Andrijašević | KAA Gent | (China) Zhejiang Professional F.C. | Undisclosed | |
| 8 July 2021 | (Germany) Niklas Dorsch | KAA Gent | (Germany) FC Augsburg | Undisclosed | |
| 9 July 2021 | (Ivory Coast) Vakoun Issouf Bayo | (Scotland) Celtic FC | KAA Gent | Undisclosed | |
| 15 July 2021 | Yari Stevens | Club Brugge | KAA Gent | Undisclosed | |
| 31 July 2021 | (Ukraine) Roman Yaremchuk | KAA Gent | (Portugal) S.L. Benfica | Undisclosed | |
| 3 August 2021 | Dylan Mbayo | K.A.A. Gent | K.V. Kortrijk | Undisclosed | |
| 9 August 2021 | (Ivory Coast) Anderson Niangbo | KAA Gent | (Austria) SK Sturm Graz | Loan | |
| 12 August 2021 | (Ghana) Osman Bukari | KAA Gent | (France) FC Nantes | Loan | |
| 24 August 2021 | (Serbia) Darko Lemajić | (Latvia) FK RFS | KAA Gent | Undisclosed | |
| 31 August 2021 | Ilombe Mboyo | Sint-Truidense V.V. | KAA Gent | Undisclosed | |

== Pre-season and friendlies ==
Win Draw Loss Fixtures

| 18 June 2021 Friendly | Dikkelvenne (Belgium) | 2–3 | (Belgium) Gent | Belgium |
| 19:00 CEST (UTC+2) | | | | Attendance: 600 |

| 9 July 2021 Friendly | FC Utrecht (Netherlands) | 3–0 | (Belgium) Gent | Scharendijke, Netherlands |
| 14:45 CEST (UTC+2) | Douvikas 38'; Van de Streek 61'; Ramselaar 73' |

| 10 July 2021 Friendly | Sparta Rotterdam (Netherlands) | 3–3 | (Belgium) Gent | Netherlands |
| 14:00 CEST (UTC+2) |

| 14 July 2021 Friendly | Lille (France) | 0–1 | (Belgium) Gent | Camphin-en-Pévèle, France |
| 17:00 CEST (UTC+2) | Agouzoul (red card) 59' | | Bruno 2' | Stadium: Domaine de Luchin |

| 14 July 2021 Friendly | Sporting CP (Portugal) | Cancelled | (Belgium) Gent | Portugal |
| 20:30 WEST (UTC+1) |

| 16 July 2021 Friendly | Benfica (Portugal) | Cancelled | (Belgium) Gent | Lisbon, Portugal |
| --:-- WEST (UTC+1) | | | | Stadium: Estádio da Luz |

| 7 January 2022 Friendly | Gent (Belgium) | 0–1 | (Netherlands) AZ Alkmaar | Oliva, Spain |
| 15:00 CET (UTC+1) |

== Competitions ==
=== Overall record ===
| Competition | First match | Last match | Starting round | Final position | Record | | | | | | | |
| Competition | First match | Last match | Starting round | Final position | Pld | W | D | L | GF | GA | GD | Win % |
|---|---|---|---|---|---|---|---|---|---|---|---|---|
| First Division A | 25 July 2021 | 21 May 2022 | Matchday 1 | 5th | 40 | 22 | 8 | 10 | 65 | 35 | +30 | 55.00 |
| Belgian Cup | 27 October 2021 | 18 April 2022 | Sixth round | Winners | 5 | 3 | 1 | 1 | 9 | 2 | +7 | 60.00 |
| Europa Conference League | 22 July 2021 | 17 March 2022 | Second qualifying round | Round of 16 | 13 | 7 | 2 | 4 | 17 | 7 | +10 | 53.85 |
| Total | | | | | 58 | 32 | 11 | 15 | 91 | 44 | +47 | 55.17 |

Last updated: 21 May 2022
Source: Soccerway

=== First Division A ===
==== League table ====
| Pos | Team | Pld | W | D | L | GF | GA | GD | Pts | Qualification or relegation |
|---|---|---|---|---|---|---|---|---|---|---|
| 3 | Anderlecht | 34 | 18 | 10 | 6 | 72 | 36 | +36 | 64 | Qualification for the Play-offs I |
| 4 | Antwerp | 34 | 19 | 6 | 9 | 55 | 38 | +17 | 63 | Qualification for the Play-offs I |
| 5 | Gent | 34 | 18 | 8 | 8 | 56 | 30 | +26 | 62 | Qualification for the Play-offs II |
| 6 | Charleroi | 34 | 15 | 9 | 10 | 55 | 46 | +9 | 54 | Qualification for the Play-offs II |
| 7 | Mechelen | 34 | 15 | 7 | 12 | 57 | 61 | −4 | 52 | Qualification for the Play-offs II |

Source: Jupiler Pro League (in Dutch), Soccerway
Rules for classification: 1) Points; 2) Matches won; 3) Goal difference; 4) Goals scored; 5) Away matches won; 6) Away goal difference; 7) Away goals scored; 8) Play-off.

==== Results summary ====
| Overall | | | | | | | | Home | | | | | | Away | | | | | |
| Pld | W | D | L | GF | GA | GD | Pts | W | D | L | GF | GA | GD | W | D | L | GF | GA | GD |
|---|---|---|---|---|---|---|---|---|---|---|---|---|---|---|---|---|---|---|---|
| 34 | 18 | 8 | 8 | 56 | 30 | +26 | 62 | 11 | 3 | 3 | 37 | 16 | +21 | 7 | 5 | 5 | 19 | 14 | +5 |

Source: Jupiler Pro League

==== Results by round ====
| Round | 1 | 2 | 3 | 4 | 5 | 6 | 7 | 8 | 9 | 10 | 11 | 12 | 13 | 14 | 15 | 16 | 17 | 18 | 19 | 20 | 21 | 22 | 23 | 24 | 25 | 26 | 27 | 28 | 29 | 30 | 31 | 32 | 33 | 34 |
|---|---|---|---|---|---|---|---|---|---|---|---|---|---|---|---|---|---|---|---|---|---|---|---|---|---|---|---|---|---|---|---|---|---|---|
| Ground | A | H | A | H | A | H | H | A | H | A | H | A | H | A | A | H | A | H | A | H | A | H | A | H | H | A | A | H | A | H | A | H | A | H |
| Result | L | D | L | W | D | W | L | L | W | L | W | W | L | D | W | W | W | W | L | W | D | D | D | D | L | W | W | W | W | W | W | W | D | W |
| Position | 14 | 14 | 17 | 12 | 14 | 11 | 15 | 16 | 13 | 14 | 12 | 9 | 10 | 10 | 7 | 7 | 6 | 6 | 6 | 6 | 6 | 5 | 5 | 5 | 6 | 6 | 5 | 5 | 5 | 5 | 5 | 4 | 5 | 5 |

Source: Jupiler Pro League
A = Away; H = Home; W = Win; D = Draw; L = Loss

==== Matches ====
The league fixtures were announced on 8 June 2021.

| 25 July 2021 1 | Sint-Truiden | 2–1 | Gent | Sint-Truiden |
| 21:00 CEST (UTC+2) | Mboyo 12'; Van Dessel (yellow card) 60'; Brüls 67'; Janssens (yellow card) 80' | Report | Hanche-Olsen 2', (yellow card) 66' | Stadium: Stayen; Attendance: 2,000; Referee: Jan Boterberg |

| 1 August 2021 2 | Gent | 2–2 | Beerschot | Ghent |
| 18:30 CEST (UTC+2) | Bruno 19'; Tissoudali 47' | Report | Sanyang 73'; Noubissi 77' | Stadium: Ghelamco Arena; Attendance: 5,250; Referee: Jasper Vergoote |

| 8 August 2021 3 | Oostende | 1–0 | Gent | Ostend |
| 21:00 CEST (UTC+2) | Gueye 73' | Report | | Stadium: Diaz Arena; Attendance: 2,443; Referee: Alexandre Boucaut |

| 15 August 2021 4 | Gent | 2–0 | KV Mechelen | Ghent |
| 16:00 CEST (UTC+2) | Ngadeu-Ngadjui 28'; Fortuna 90+2' | Report | | Stadium: Ghelamco Arena; Attendance: 14,604; Referee: Nathan Verboomen |

| 29 August 2021 6 | Gent | 6–1 | Club Brugge | Ghent |
| 13:30 CEST (UTC+2) | Tissoudali 9'; De Sart 15' (pen.); Fortuna 38'; Bezus 61'; Depoitre 66'; Mignolet 79' (o.g.) | Report | Vanaken 65' | Stadium: Ghelamco Arena; Attendance: 16,000; Referee: Erik Lambrechts |

| 12 September 2021 7 | Gent | 2–3 | Charleroi | Ghent |
| 16:00 CEST (UTC+2) | Castro-Montes 35'; Depoitre 57' | Report | Gholizadeh 5'; Fall 12'; Hanche-Olsen 90+5' (o.g.) | Stadium: Ghelamco Arena; Attendance: 16,379; Referee: Lothar D'hondt |

| 19 September 2021 8 | Kortrijk | 1–0 | Gent | Kortrijk |
| 21:00 CEST (UTC+2) | Selemani 9' (pen.) | Report | | Stadium: Guldensporen Stadion; Attendance: 5,053; Referee: Jasper Vergoote |

| 23 September 2021 5 | Anderlecht | 1–1 | Gent | Anderlecht |
| 20:45 CEST (UTC+2) | Refaelov 59' | Report | Castro-Montes 39' | Stadium: Constant Vanden Stock Stadium; Attendance: 19,000; Referee: Erik Lambrechts |

| 26 September 2021 9 | Gent | 2–1 | Cercle Brugge | Ghent |
| 16:00 CEST (UTC+2) | De Sart 63'; Lemajić 73' | Report | Millán 38' | Stadium: Ghelamco Arena; Attendance: 16,391; Referee: Christof Dierick |

| 3 October 2021 10 | Antwerp | 1–0 | Gent | Antwerp |
| 18:30 CEST (UTC+2) | Bataille (yellow card) 20'; Frey 78' | Report | Chakvetadze (red card) 33'; Samoise (yellow card) 54'; De Sart (yellow card) 90+2' | Stadium: Bosuilstadion; Attendance: 14,706; Referee: Alexandre Boucaut |

| 17 October 2021 11 | Gent | 2–0 | Eupen | Ghent |
| 21:00 CEST (UTC+2) | Tissoudali 42'; Depoitre 71' | Report | | Stadium: Ghelamco Arena; Attendance: 16,125; Referee: Nicolas Laforge |

| 24 October 2021 12 | Genk | 0–3 | Gent | Genk |
| 18:30 CEST (UTC+2) | | Report | Samoise 43'; Bezus 60'; Tissoudali 79' | Stadium: Luminus Arena; Attendance: 15,296; Referee: Erik Lambrechts |

| 31 October 2021 13 | Gent | 0–2 | Union Saint-Gilloise | Gent |
| 21:00 CET (UTC+1) | Kums (yellow card) 43'; Bolat (yellow card) 44' | Report | Vanzeir 7'; Van der Heyden (yellow card) 36'; Undav (yellow card) 41'; Teuma 45'; Mitoma (yellow card) 47'; Nielsen (yellow card) 88' | Stadium: Ghelamco Arena; Attendance: 17,541; Referee: Lawrence Visser |

| 7 November 2021 14 | RFC Seraing | 0–0 | Gent | Seraing |
| 16:00 CET (UTC+1) | | Report | | Stadium: Stade du Pairay; Attendance: 1,500; Referee: Alexandre Boucaut |

| 20 November 2021 15 | Zulte Waregem | 1–2 | Gent | Waregem |
| 18:30 CET (UTC+1) | Gano 82' | Report | Odjidja-Ofoe 55'; Depoitre 75' | Stadium: Regenboogstadion; Attendance: 7,476; Referee: Bert Put |

| 28 November 2021 16 | Gent | 3–1 | Standard Liège | Ghent |
| 18:30 CEST (UTC+2) | Tissoudali 22', 67'; Siquet 57' (o.g.) | Report | Dønnum 68' | Stadium: Ghelamco Arena; Attendance: 18,120; Referee: Jonathan Lardot |

| 4 December 2021 17 | OH Leuven | 0–1 | Gent | Leuven |
| 16:15 CET (UTC+1) | | Report | Tissoudali 10' | Stadium: Den Dreef; Attendance: 4,047; Referee: Jan Boterberg |

| 12 December 2021 18 | Gent | 1–0 | Genk | Ghent |
| 18:30 CET (UTC+1) | De Sart 29'; Bezus (yellow card) 79' | Report | | Stadium: Ghelamco Arena; Attendance: 16,448; Referee: Nathan Verboomen |

| 15 December 2021 19 | KV Mechelen | 4–3 | Gent | Mechelen |
| 18:45 CET (UTC+1) | Mrabti 36', 60'; Storm 54', 70' | Report | Tissoudali 33', 68'; Depoitre 50' | Stadium: Achter de Kazerne; Attendance: 12,385; Referee: Erik Lambrechts |

| 18 December 2021 20 | Gent | 2–1 | Sint-Truiden | Ghent |
| 20:45 CEST (UTC+2) | Depoitre 27'; Tissoudali 64' | Report | Hara 85' | Stadium: Ghelamco Arena; Attendance: 16,485; Referee: Lothar D'hondt |

| 26 December 2021 21 | Union Saint-Gilloise | 0–0 | Gent | Brussels |
| 18:30 CET (UTC+1) | | Report | Hjulsager (yellow card) 21'; De Sart (yellow card) 23'; Bezus (yellow card) 86' | Stadium: Stade Joseph Marien; Referee: Lawrence Visser |

| 14 January 2022 22 | Gent | 2–2 | Kortrijk | Ghent |
| 20:45 CEST (UTC+2) | Castro-Montes 44'; Mboyo 52' | Report | Mbayo 8', 90+1' | Stadium: Ghelamco Arena; Attendance: 0 Referee: Wim Smet |

| 22 January 2022 23 | Charleroi | 0–0 | Gent | Charleroi |
| 20:45 CET (UTC+1) | | Report | | Stadium: Stade du Pays de Charleroi; Referee: Jasper Vergoote |

| 25 January 2022 24 | Gent | 1–1 | Oostende | Ghent |
| 21:00 CEST (UTC+2) | Hjulsager 74' | Report | Ambrose 8' | Stadium: Ghelamco Arena; Referee: Brent Staessens |

| 30 January 2022 25 | Gent | 0–1 | Antwerp | Ghent |
| 16:00 CET (UTC+1) | Samoise (yellow card) 66'; Okumu (yellow card) 90+3'; Bolat (yellow card) 90+3' | Report | Frey (penalty missed) 14'; Yusuf 16'; Balikwisha (yellow card) 45+2'; B. Verstraete (yellow card) 89'; Haroun (yellow card) 90+1' | Stadium: Ghelamco Arena; Referee: Lothar D'hondt |

| 6 February 2022 26 | Club Brugge | 1–2 | Gent | Bruges |
| 13:30 CET (UTC+1) | De Ketelaere 76' | Report | Hjulsager 36'; Tissoudali 67' | Stadium: Jan Breydel Stadium; Referee: Nicolas Laforge |

| 12 February 2022 27 | Eupen | 0–1 | Gent | Eupen |
| 16:15 CET (UTC+1) | | Report | Depoitre 15'; Hjulsager (yellow card) 33'; Samoise (red card) 51'; De Sart (yellow card) 84' | Stadium: Kehrwegstadion; Attendance: 2,000; Referee: Lawrence Visser |

| 18 February 2022 28 | Gent | 4–0 | RFC Seraing | Ghent |
| 20:45 CET (UTC+1) | Samoise (yellow card) 13', (goal) 46'; Depoitre 16'; Tissoudali 20', 23' | Report | | Stadium: Ghelamco Arena; Attendance: 16,469; Referee: Jasper Vergoote |

| 27 February 2022 29 | Standard Liège | 0–1 | Gent | Liège |
| 18:30 CET (UTC+1) | | Report | Tissoudali 88' | Stadium: Stade Maurice Dufrasne; Referee: Jonathan Lardot |

| 6 March 2022 30 | Gent | 2–1 | Zulte Waregem | Ghent |
| 21:00 CET (UTC+1) | Depoitre 12'; Bezus 90+4' | Report | Vossen 70' | Stadium: Ghelamco Arena; Attendance: 15,000; Referee: Nicolas Laforge |

| 13 March 2022 31 | Beerschot | 0–2 | Gent | Antwerp |
| 18:30 CET (UTC+1) | | Report | De Sart (yellow card) 36', (goal) 44'; Lemajić 65', (yellow card) 68' | Stadium: Olympic Stadium; Referee: Kevin Van Damme |

| 20 March 2022 32 | Gent | 1–0 | Anderlecht | Ghent |
| 18:30 CET (UTC+1) | Tissoudali 81' | Report | | Stadium: Ghelamco Arena; Attendance: 19,990; Referee: Jonathan Lardot |

| 3 April 2022 33 | Cercle Brugge | 2–2 | Gent | Bruges |
| 16:00 CEST (UTC+2) | Somers 4', 81' | Report | Tissoudali 3'; Depoitre (yellow card) 22', (goal) 30'; Hjulsager (red card) 86' | Stadium: Jan Breydel Stadium; Attendance: 6,572; Referee: Nicolas Laforge |

| 10 April 2022 34 | Gent | 5–0 | OH Leuven | Ghent |
| 18:30 CEST (UTC+2) | De Sart 42'; Tissoudali 48', 89', 90'; Hjulsager 86' | Report | | Stadium: Ghelamco Arena; Attendance: 19,524; Referee: Jasper Vergoote |

==== Play-Off II ====
| Pos | Team | Pld | W | D | L | GF | GA | GD | Pts | Qualification or relegation | GNT | GNK | CHA | MEC |
|---|---|---|---|---|---|---|---|---|---|---|---|---|---|---|
| 1 | Gent | 6 | 4 | 0 | 2 | 9 | 5 | +4 | 43 | Qualification for the Europa League play-off round (Note: Gent qualified for the Europa League play-off round as the 2021–22 Belgian Cup winners.) | — | 0–1 | 1–2 | 1–0 |
| 2 | Genk | 6 | 3 | 2 | 1 | 10 | 8 | +2 | 37 | | 0–2 | — | 3–2 | 4–2 |
| 3 | Charleroi | 6 | 2 | 1 | 3 | 10 | 12 | −2 | 34 | | 1–3 | 2–2 | — | 3–2 |
| 4 | Mechelen | 6 | 1 | 1 | 4 | 6 | 10 | −4 | 30 | | 1–2 | 0–0 | 1–0 | — |

Source: Jupiler Pro League (in Dutch), Soccerway
Legend: Blue = home team win; Yellow = draw; Red = away team win.
Rules for classification: 1) Points; 2) Points without (possible) half points added due to rounding; 3) Regular season finishing position.

==== Results summary ====
| Overall | | | | | | | | Home | | | | | | Away | | | | | |
| Pld | W | D | L | GF | GA | GD | Pts | W | D | L | GF | GA | GD | W | D | L | GF | GA | GD |
|---|---|---|---|---|---|---|---|---|---|---|---|---|---|---|---|---|---|---|---|
| 6 | 4 | 0 | 2 | 9 | 5 | +4 | 12 | 1 | 0 | 2 | 2 | 3 | −1 | 3 | 0 | 0 | 7 | 2 | +5 |

Last updated: 21 May 2022.
Source: Jupiler Pro League

==== Results by round ====
| Round | 1 | 2 | 3 | 4 | 5 | 6 |
|---|---|---|---|---|---|---|
| Ground | H | A | H | A | A | H |
| Result | L | W | W | W | W | L |
| Position | 3 | 1 | 1 | 1 | 1 | 1 |

Updated to match(es) played on 21 May 2022. Source: Jupiler Pro League
A = Away; H = Home; W = Win; D = Draw; L = Loss

==== Matches ====
| 24 April 2022 1 | Gent | 0–1 | Genk | Ghent |
| 16:00 CEST (UTC+2) | Odjidja-Ofoe (yellow card) 34' (yellow-red card) 35'; Lemajić (yellow card) 41'; Samoise (yellow card) 44' | Report | Bongonda (yellow card) 46'; Heynen (yellow card) 73'; Paintsil (yellow card) 86'; Németh 90+1' | Stadium: Ghelamco Arena; Attendance: 18,474; Referee: Nathan Verboomen |

| 30 April 2022 2 | Charleroi | 1–3 | Gent | Charleroi |
| 18:00 CEST (UTC+2) | Zorgane 45'; Nkuba (yellow card) 53'; Knezevic (yellow card) 90+1' | Report | Lemajić 53', 61', (yellow card) 43'; Ngadeu-Ngadjui 67' | Stadium: Stade du Pays de Charleroi; Attendance: 4,985; Referee: Erik Lambrechts |

| 7 May 2022 3 | Gent | 1–0 | KV Mechelen | Ghent |
| 20:45 CEST (UTC+2) | De Sart (yellow card) 70'; Okumu 82' | Report | Van Hoorenbeeck (yellow card) 62'; Van Hecke (yellow card) 88'; Hairemans (yellow card) 90'; Peyre (red card) 90+3' | Stadium: Ghelamco Arena; Attendance: 8,363; Referee: Alexandre Boucaut |

| 10 May 2022 4 | KV Mechelen | 1–2 | Gent | Mechelen |
| 18:45 CEST (UTC+2) | Mrabti (penalty missed) 45+4'; Hairemans 89' | Report | Ngadeu-Ngadjui 36'; Bezus (yellow card) 85'; Godeau (yellow card) 87'; Owusu (yellow card) 90'; Tissoudali 90+4' | Stadium: Achter de Kazerne; Attendance: 8,213; Referee: Jan Boterberg |

| 15 May 2022 5 | Genk | 0–2 | Gent | Genk |
| 16:00 CEST (UTC+2) | | Report | Tissoudali 29'; Odjidja-Ofoe 72' | Stadium: Luminus Arena; Referee: Nicolas Laforge |

| 21 May 2022 6 | Gent | 1–2 | Charleroi | Ghent |
| 20:45 CEST (UTC+2) | Ngadeu-Ngadjui 40' | Report | Gholizadeh 15'; Heymans 90+2' | Stadium: Ghelamco Arena; Referee: Wesli De Cremer |

=== Belgian Cup ===
| 27 October 2021 Sixth round | Gent | 4–0 | Belisia Bilzen | Ghent |
| 20:00 CEST (UTC+2) | Odjidja-Ofoe 6'; Okumu 24'; Mboyo 43'; Chakvetadze 64' (pen.) | Report | | Stadium: Ghelamco Arena; Referee: Quentin Pirard |

| 1 December 2021 Seventh round | Lommel | 0–2 | Gent | Lommel |
| 20:00 CET (UTC+1) | | Report | De Sart 18', 76' (pen.) | Stadium: Soevereinstadion; Referee: Christof Dierick |

| 22 December 2021 Quarter-finals | Gent | 3–1 | Standard Liège | Ghent |
| 20:30 CET (UTC+1) | Kums 8'; Tissoudali 53', 90+2' | Report | Dønnum 46' | Stadium: Ghelamco Arena; Referee: Jonathan Lardot |

| 2 February 2022 Semi-finals; First leg | Gent | 0–1 | Club Brugge | Ghent |
| 20:45 CET (UTC+1) | | Report | De Ketelaere 56' | Stadium: Ghelamco Arena; Referee: Nathan Verboomen |

| 2 March 2022 Semi-finals; Second leg | Club Brugge | 0–3 (1–3 agg.) | Gent | Bruges |
| 20:45 CET (UTC+1) | | Report | Odjidja-Ofoe 3'; Castro-Montes 36'; Depoitre 55' | Stadium: Jan Breydel Stadium; Attendance: 20,000; Referee: Erik Lambrechts |

| 18 April 2022 Final | Gent | 0–0 (a.e.t.) (4–3 p) | Anderlecht | Brussels |
| 15:00 CEST (UTC+2) | | Report | | Stadium: King Baudouin Stadium; Referee: Lawrence Visser |
| | Penalties |
| | De Sart (penalty scored); Hanche-Olsen (penalty scored); Castro-Montes (penalty scored); Lemajić (penalty scored); Ngadeu-Ngadjui (penalty missed) | | (penalty scored) Gómez; (penalty scored) Raman; (penalty scored) Castro-Montes; (penalty missed) Kana; (penalty missed) Murillo |

=== UEFA Europa Conference League ===
==== Second qualifying round ====
The draw for the second qualifying round was held on 16 June 2021.

| 22 July 2021 First leg | Gent (Belgium) | 4–0 | (Norway) Vålerenga | Ghent, Belgium |
| 20:30 CEST (UTC+2) | Bruno 11', (penalty missed) 72'; Tissoudali 39'; Odjidja-Ofoe 56'; Malede 88'; De Sart (yellow card) 90+4' | Report | Bjørdal (yellow card) 58'; Sahraoui (yellow card) 70'; Borchgrevink (yellow card) 78' | Stadium: Ghelamco Arena; Attendance: 3,823; Referee: Mario Zebec (Croatia) |

| 29 July 2021 Second leg | Vålerenga (Norway) | 2–0 (2–4 agg.) | (Belgium) Gent | Oslo, Norway |
| 19:00 CEST (UTC+2) | Okumu 11' (o.g.); Näsberg 81' | Report | | Stadium: Intility Arena; Attendance: 2,000; Referee: Kirill Levnikov (Russia) |

==== Third qualifying round ====
The draw for the third qualifying round was held on 19 July 2021.

| 5 August 2021 First leg | Gent (Belgium) | 2–2 | (Latvia) RFS | Ghent, Belgium |
| 20:30 CEST (UTC+2) | Oladoye 52'; Tissoudali 77' | Report | Lemajić 11'; Šimkovič 28' | Stadium: Ghelamco Arena; Attendance: 3,887; Referee: Mohammed Al-Hakim (Sweden) |

| 12 August 2021 Second leg | RFS (Latvia) | 0–1 (2–3 agg.) | (Belgium) Gent | Jūrmala, Latvia |
| 19:00 CEST (UTC+2) | | Report | Okumu 73' | Stadium: Slokas Stadium; Attendance: 1,507; Referee: Rade Obrenovič (Slovenia) |
Note: RFS played their home matches at Slokas Stadium, Jūrmala, instead of their regular stadium Stadions Arkādija, Riga, which did not meet UEFA requirements

==== Play-off round ====
The draw for the play-off round was held on 2 August 2021.

| 19 August 2021 First leg | Raków Częstochowa (Poland) | 1–0 | (Belgium) Gent | Bielsko-Biała, Poland |
| 18:00 CEST (UTC+2) | Niewulis 64' | Report | | Stadium: BBOSiR Stadium; Attendance: 7,411; Referee: Alejandro Hernández (Spain) |
Note: Raków Częstochowa played their home matches at BBOSiR stadium in Bielsko Biała, instead of their regular stadium Miejski Stadion Piłkarski "Raków", Częstochowa, which did not meet UEFA requirements

| 26 August 2021 Second leg | Gent (Belgium) | 3–0 (3–1 agg.) | (Poland) Raków Częstochowa | Ghent, Belgium |
| 20:00 CEST (UTC+2) | Tissoudali 45+1'; Odjidja-Ofoe 70'; De Sart 72' | Report | | Stadium: Ghelamco Arena; Attendance: 10,096; Referee: Aliyar Aghayev (Azerbaijan) |

==== Group stage ====
The draw for the group stage was held on 27 August 2021.

| Pos | Team | Pld | W | D | L | GF | GA | GD | Pts | Qualification | GNT | PAR | ANO | FLO |
|---|---|---|---|---|---|---|---|---|---|---|---|---|---|---|
| 1 | (Belgium) Gent | 6 | 4 | 1 | 1 | 6 | 2 | +4 | 13 | Advance to round of 16 | — | 1–1 | 2–0 | 1–0 |
| 2 | (Serbia) Partizan | 6 | 2 | 2 | 2 | 6 | 4 | +2 | 8 | Advance to knockout round play-offs | 0–1 | — | 1–1 | 2–0 |
| 3 | (Cyprus) Anorthosis Famagusta | 6 | 1 | 3 | 2 | 6 | 9 | −3 | 6 | | 1–0 | 0–2 | — | 2–2 |
| 4 | (Estonia) Flora | 6 | 1 | 2 | 3 | 5 | 8 | −3 | 5 | | 0–1 | 1–0 | 2–2 | — |

Source: UEFA
Rules for classification: Group stage tiebreakers

| 16 September 2021 1 | Flora (Estonia) | 0–1 | (Belgium) Gent | Tallinn, Estonia |
| 18:45 (19:45 EEST) | | Report | Lemajić 54' | Stadium: Lilleküla Stadium; Attendance: 2,666; Referee: Trustin Farrugia Cann (Malta) |

| 30 September 2021 2 | Gent (Belgium) | 2–0 | (Cyprus) Anorthosis Famagusta | Ghent, Belgium |
| 18:45 | Correa 28' (o.g.); Kums 81' | Report | | Stadium: Ghelamco Arena; Attendance: 10,209; Referee: Filip Glova (Slovakia) |

| 21 October 2021 3 | Partizan (Serbia) | 0–1 | (Belgium) Gent | Belgrade, Serbia |
| 21:00 | | Report | Kums 59' | Stadium: Partizan Stadium; Attendance: 8,943; Referee: Bobby Madden (Scotland) |

| 4 November 2021 4 | Gent (Belgium) | 1–1 | (Serbia) Partizan | Ghent, Belgium |
| 18:45 | Tissoudali 80' | Report | Urošević 66' | Stadium: Ghelamco Arena; Attendance: 10,595; Referee: Chris Kavanagh (England) |

| 25 November 2021 5 | Anorthosis Famagusta (Cyprus) | 1–0 | (Belgium) Gent | Nicosia, Cyprus |
| 21:00 (22:00 EET) | Christodoulopoulos 27' | Report | | Stadium: GSP Stadium; Attendance: 2,573; Referee: Urs Schnyder (Switzerland) |

| 9 December 2021 6 | Gent (Belgium) | 1–0 | (Estonia) Flora | Ghent, Belgium |
| 18:45 | Bruno 51' | Report | | Stadium: Ghelamco Arena; Attendance: 7,421; Referee: Kaspar Sjöberg (Sweden) |

==== Knockout phase ====
===== Round of 16 =====
The draw for the round of 16 was held on 25 February 2022.

| 10 March 2022 First Leg | PAOK (Greece) | 1–0 | (Belgium) Gent | Thessaloniki, Greece |
| 18:45 CET (UTC+01:00) | Kurtić 58' | Report | | Stadium: Toumba Stadium; Attendance: 9,098; Referee: Bartosz Frankowski (Poland) |

| 17 March 2022 Second Leg | Gent (Belgium) | 1–2 (1–3 agg.) | (Greece) PAOK | Ghent, Belgium |
| 21:00 CET (UTC+01:00) | Depoitre 40' | Report | Crespo 20'; Douglas Augusto 77' | Stadium: Ghelamco Arena; Referee: Daniel Siebert (Germany) |

== Statistics ==
=== Squad appearances and goals ===
Last updated on 10 April 2022

| No. | Pos | Nat | Player | Total | | Belgian Division | | Belgian Cup | | UEFA Europa Conference League | |
| No. | Pos | Nat | Player | Apps | Goals | Apps | Goals | Apps | Goals | Apps | Goals |
Goalkeepers
| 1 | GK | (Turkey) TUR | Sinan Bolat | 39 | 0 | 25 | 0 | 4 | 0 | 10 | 0 |
| 26 | GK | (Belgium) BEL | Louis Fortin | 1 | 0 | 1 | 0 | 0 | 0 | 0 | 0 |
| 30 | GK | (Belgium) BEL | Célestin De Schrevel | 1 | 0 | 0+1 | 0 | 0 | 0 | 0 | 0 |
| 33 | GK | (Belgium) BEL | Davy Roef | 20 | 0 | 14 | 0 | 2 | 0 | 4 | 0 |
Defenders
| 2 | DF | (Kenya) KEN | Joseph Okumu | 47 | 3 | 26+5 | 1 | 6 | 1 | 10 | 1 |
| 3 | DF | (Ivory Coast) CIV | Christopher Operi | 17 | 0 | 6+4 | 0 | 1 | 0 | 6 | 0 |
| 4 | DF | (Belgium) BEL | Bram Lagae | 1 | 0 | 0+1 | 0 | 0 | 0 | 0 | 0 |
| 5 | DF | (Cameroon) CMR | Michael Ngadeu-Ngadjui | 49 | 4 | 33 | 4 | 3 | 0 | 13 | 0 |
| 14 | DF | (Belgium) BEL | Alessio Castro-Montes | 53 | 4 | 29+6 | 3 | 5 | 1 | 13 | 0 |
| 16 | DF | (France) FRA | Ibrahima Cissé | 3 | 0 | 0+2 | 0 | 0 | 0 | 0+1 | 0 |
| 20 | DF | (Germany) GER | Jordan Torunarigha | 15 | 1 | 10+1 | 1 | 2 | 0 | 1+1 | 0 |
| 21 | DF | (Norway) NOR | Andreas Hanche-Olsen | 55 | 1 | 35+2 | 1 | 3+3 | 0 | 11+1 | 0 |
| 25 | DF | (Angola) ANG | Núrio Fortuna | 46 | 2 | 24+8 | 2 | 2+2 | 0 | 6+4 | 0 |
| 31 | DF | (Belgium) BEL | Bruno Godeau | 31 | 0 | 14+6 | 0 | 3 | 0 | 7+1 | 0 |
| 32 | DF | (Belgium) BEL | Cederic Van Daele | 0 | 0 | 0 | 0 | 0 | 0 | 0 | 0 |
Midfielders
| 6 | MF | (Ghana) GHA | Elisha Owusu | 35 | 0 | 14+9 | 0 | 1+3 | 0 | 7+1 | 0 |
| 8 | MF | (Belgium) BEL | Vadis Odjidja-Ofoe | 48 | 6 | 21+8 | 2 | 5+1 | 2 | 9+4 | 2 |
| 9 | MF | (Ukraine) UKR | Roman Bezus | 36 | 3 | 9+17 | 3 | 1 | 0 | 4+5 | 0 |
| 12 | MF | (Belgium) BEL | Alexandre De Bruyn | 0 | 0 | 0 | 0 | 0 | 0 | 0 | 0 |
| 13 | MF | (Belgium) BEL | Julien De Sart | 52 | 8 | 33+2 | 5 | 5 | 2 | 6+6 | 1 |
| 15 | MF | (Nigeria) NGR | Adewale Oladoye | 9 | 1 | 0+3 | 0 | 0+1 | 0 | 1+4 | 1 |
| 17 | MF | (Denmark) DEN | Andrew Hjulsager | 37 | 3 | 13+11 | 3 | 1+4 | 0 | 6+2 | 0 |
| 18 | MF | (Belgium) BEL | Matisse Samoise | 45 | 2 | 28+4 | 2 | 4+1 | 0 | 4+4 | 0 |
| 22 | MF | (The Gambia) GAM | Sulayman Marreh | 6 | 0 | 0+3 | 0 | 1+1 | 0 | 0+1 | 0 |
| 24 | MF | (Belgium) BEL | Sven Kums | 54 | 3 | 29+9 | 0 | 5 | 1 | 9+2 | 2 |
| 28 | MF | (Belgium) BEL | Wouter George | 0 | 0 | 0 | 0 | 0 | 0 | 0 | 0 |
Forwards
| 7 | FW | (Belgium) BEL | Dylan Mbayo | 13 | 2 | 2+6 | 1 | 1 | 1 | 1+3 | 0 |
| 11 | FW | (Serbia) SRB | Darko Lemajić | 27 | 5 | 9+13 | 4 | 1+1 | 0 | 3 | 1 |
| 16 | FW | (Nigeria) NGR | Chinonso Emeka | 0 | 0 | 0 | 0 | 0 | 0 | 0 | 0 |
| 19 | FW | (Belgium) BEL | Gianni Bruno | 16 | 3 | 4+5 | 1 | 1+1 | 0 | 5 | 2 |
| 23 | FW | (Israel) ISR | Yonas Malede | 30 | 1 | 6+18 | 0 | 0+3 | 0 | 0+3 | 1 |
| 27 | FW | (Ivory Coast) CIV | Vakoun Issouf Bayo | 7 | 0 | 1+2 | 0 | 0+1 | 0 | 0+3 | 0 |
| 29 | FW | (Belgium) BEL | Laurent Depoitre | 42 | 12 | 22+3 | 10 | 3+1 | 1 | 8+5 | 1 |
| 34 | FW | (Morocco) MAR | Tarik Tissoudali | 52 | 27 | 28+6 | 21 | 5 | 2 | 8+5 | 4 |
Players who have made an appearance this season but have left the club
| 10 | MF | (Georgia (country)) GEO | Giorgi Chakvetadze | 15 | 1 | 4+4 | 0 | 1 | 1 | 2+4 | 0 |

=== Goalscorers ===
As of 30 April 2022

| Rank | Pos. | No. | Player | Pro League | Belgian Cup | Conference League | Total |
|---|---|---|---|---|---|---|---|
| 1 | FW | 34 | (Morocco) Tarik Tissoudali | 19 | 2 | 4 | 25 |
| 2 | FW | 29 | (Belgium) Laurent Depoitre | 10 | 1 | 1 | 12 |
| 3 | MF | 13 | (Belgium) Julien De Sart | 5 | 2 | 1 | 8 |
| 4 | MF | 8 | (Belgium) Vadis Odjidja-Ofoe | 1 | 2 | 2 | 5 |
| 4 | FW | 25 | (Serbia) Darko Lemajić | 4 | 0 | 1 | 5 |
| 5 | DF | 14 | (Belgium) Alessio Castro-Montes | 3 | 1 | 0 | 4 |
| 6 | MF | 17 | (Denmark) Andrew Hjulsager | 3 | 0 | 0 | 3 |
| 6 | MF | 9 | (Ukraine) Roman Bezus | 3 | 0 | 0 | 3 |
| 9 | DF | 25 | (Angola) Núrio Fortuna | 2 | 0 | 0 | 2 |
| 9 | MF | 18 | (Belgium) Matisse Samoise | 2 | 0 | 0 | 2 |
| 9 | MF | 5 | (Cameroon) Michael Ngadeu-Ngadjui | 2 | 0 | 0 | 2 |
| 10 | DF | 21 | (Norway) Andreas Hanche-Olsen | 1 | 0 | 0 | 1 |
| Total | | | | 59 | 9 | 17 | 85 |
