= Julien De Sart =

Belgian footballer (born 1994)

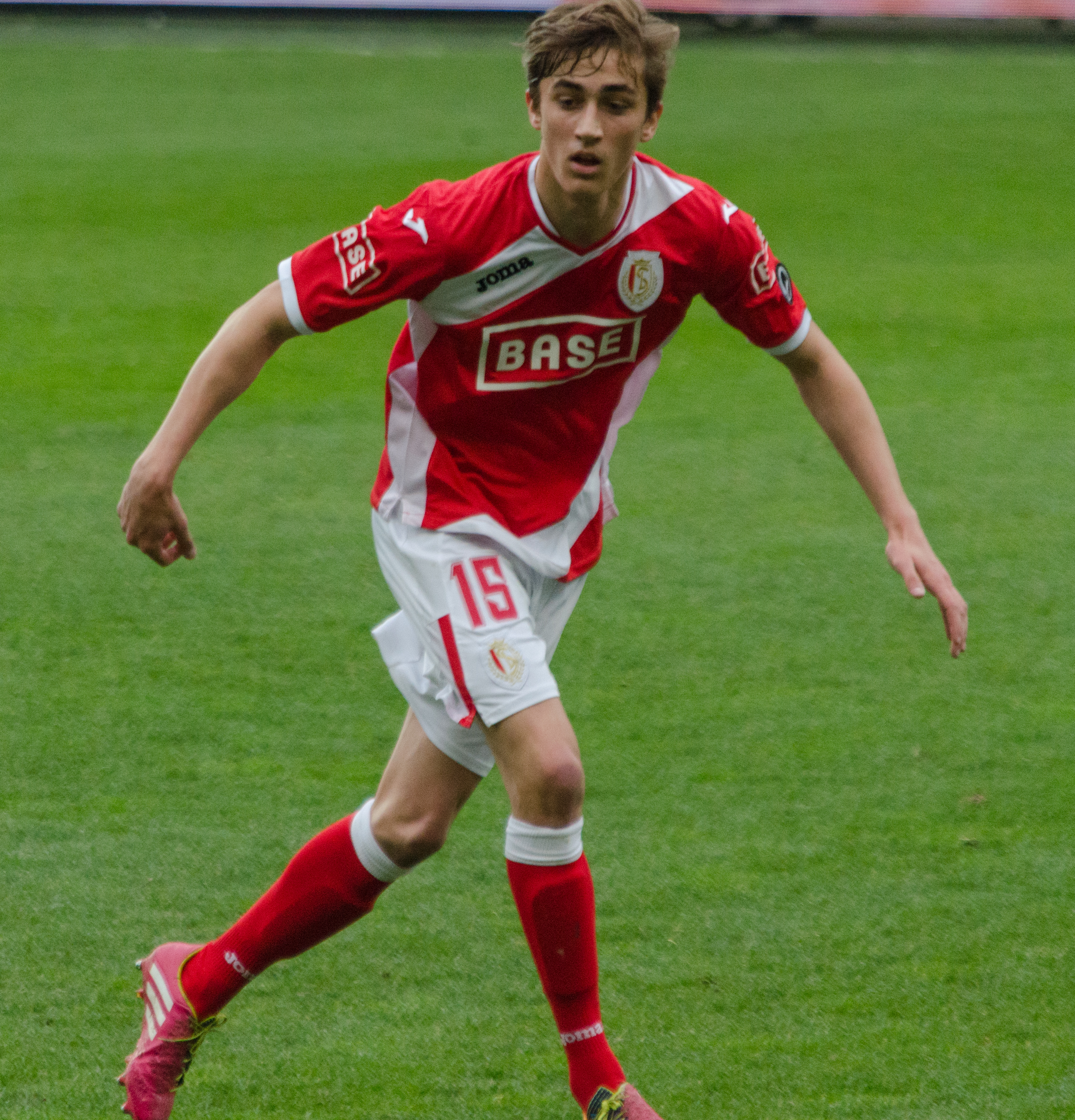
- De Sart playing for Standard Liège in 2014

Personal information
- Full name: Julien Ariel De Sart
- Date of birth: 23 December 1994 (age 31)
- Place of birth: Waremme, Belgium
- Height: 1.87 m (6 ft 2 in)
- Position: Defensive midfielder

Team information
- Current team: Al-Rayyan
- Number: 4

Youth career
- 2006–2013: Standard Liège

Senior career*
Years	Team	Apps	(Gls)
2013–2016	Standard Liège	62	(3)
2016–2018	Middlesbrough	2	(0)
2017	→ Derby County (loan)	9	(1)
2017–2018	→ Zulte Waregem (loan)	32	(0)
2018–2021	Kortrijk	83	(10)
2021–2024	Gent	100	(12)
2024–	Al-Rayyan	24	(4)

International career^{‡}
2010	Belgium U16	2	(0)
2011	Belgium U17	4	(0)
2011–2012	Belgium U18	4	(0)
2012–2014	Belgium U19	7	(1)
2014–2016	Belgium U21	9	(1)
- * Club domestic league appearances and goals as of 14:16, 7 June 2026 (UTC) ‡ National team caps and goals as of 19:45, 11 October 2016 (UTC)

Julien Ariel De Sart (born 23 December 1994) is a Belgian professional footballer who plays as a defensive midfielder for Qatari club Al-Rayyan.

He began his career in the youth academy of Standard Liège. De Sart went on to sign his first professional contract with the club's senior team in 2013, making his debut in that same year. In 2016, he signed for Middlesbrough, who would go on to achieve promotion to the Premier League that same season. He rarely played at the club, and went on loan to Derby County for more first-team experience. Following his parent club's relegation, he was sent on loan to Zulte Waregem.

De Sart represented his national country at under-16, under-17, under-18, under-19 and under-21 level.

== Club career ==
=== Standard Liège ===
On 22 August 2013, De Sart made his debut in the UEFA Europa League against Belarusian FC Minsk in a 2–0 away win. He played the full game. He's a youth exponent from the club. He is the son of Jean-François De Sart who has been a board member of Standard Liège, and the elder brother of Alexis De Sart who previously played for Standard Liège.

He made his league debut at 25 August 2013 against R.A.E.C. Mons in a 2–0 away win, coming off the bench in the first half for an injured Yoni Buyens. After 83 minutes he was sent off with a second yellow card. At 24 November 2013, he scored the only goal against R.A.E.C. Mons.

=== Middlesbrough ===
On 1 February 2016, it was confirmed that De Sart had joined English club Middlesbrough of the Championship side on a three-and-a-half-year contract for an undisclosed fee.

On 5 January 2017, it was confirmed that De Sart would be moving to Derby County on loan for the remainder of the season. He scored his first goal for Derby in a 4–3 loss to Cardiff City on 14 February 2017.

On 27 June 2017, De Sart was sent on loan to Belgian Pro League team Zulte Waregem for the 2017–18 season, thus making a return to Belgium after leaving Standard Liège in January 2016.

=== Kortrijk ===
In August 2018, De Sart left Middlesbrough and joined Kortrijk.

=== Gent ===
On 15 June 2021, he moved to Gent on a three-year contract.

=== Al-Rayyan ===
On 30 July 2024, Gent announced De Sart's transfer to Al-Rayyan in Qatar.

== Career statistics ==
As of match played 13 September 2024

Appearances and goals by club, season and competition
Club	Season	League			National cup (Note: Includes Belgian Cup, FA Cup)		League cup (Note: Includes EFL Cup)		International		Other		Total	
Club	Season	Division	Apps	Goals	Apps	Goals	Apps	Goals	Apps	Goals	Apps	Goals	Apps	Goals
Standard Liège	2013–14	Belgian Pro League	17	2	2	0	—		3 (Note: Appearances in UEFA Europa League)	0	7 (Note: Appearances in Belgian Pro League play-off)	0	29	2
Standard Liège	2014–15	Belgian Pro League	19	1	1	0	—		3	0	7	0	30	1
Standard Liège	2015–16	Belgian Pro League	12	0	1	0	—		3	0	0	0	16	0
Standard Liège	Total		48	3	4	0	—		9	0	14	0	75	3
Middlesbrough	2015–16	Championship	2	0	0	0	0	0	–		–		2	0
Middlesbrough	2016–17	Premier League	0	0	0	0	1	0	–		–		1	0
Middlesbrough	Total		2	0	0	0	1	0	–		–		3	0
Derby County (loan)	2016–17	Championship	9	1	2	0	0	0	0	0	–		11	1
Zulte Waregem (loan)	2017–18	Belgian Pro League	22	0	2	0	–		5	0	11 (Note: One appearance in Belgian Super Cup, ten appearances in Belgian Pro League play-off)	0	40	0
Kortrijk	2018–19	Belgian Pro League	23	4	3	0	–		–		8	1	34	5
Kortrijk	2019–20	Belgian Pro League	28	4	5	1	–		–		–		33	5
Kortrijk	2020–21	Belgian Pro League	24	1	0	0	–		–		–		24	1
Kortrijk	Total		75	9	8	1	–		–		8	1	91	11
Gent	2021–22	Belgian Pro League	30	5	5	2	–		12 (Note: Appearances in UEFA Europa Conference League)	1	5	0	52	8
Gent	2022–23	Belgian Pro League	21	2	3	0	–		9	0	6	0	39	2
Gent	2023–24	Belgian Pro League	38	5	2	0	–		11	2	–		51	7
Gent	2024–25	Belgian Pro League	0	0	0	0	–		1	1	–		1	1
Gent	Total		89	12	10	2	–		33	4	11	0	143	18
Al-Rayyan	2024–25	Qatar Stars League	4	1	0	0	0	0	0	0	2	0	6	1
Career total			247	26	26	3	1	0	47	4	46	1	369	34

== Honours ==
Gent

- Belgian Cup: 2021–22
