= Sven Kums =

Belgian footballer

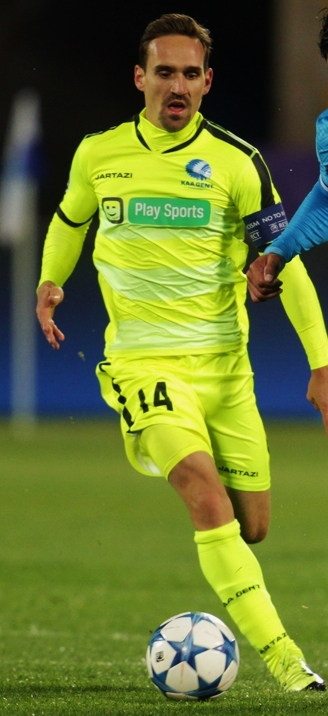
- Kums with Gent

Personal information
- Date of birth: 26 February 1988 (age 38)
- Place of birth: Asse, Belgium
- Height: 1.76 m (5 ft 9 in)
- Position: Midfielder

Youth career
- 1995–1996: Dilbeek Sport
- 1996–2006: Anderlecht

Senior career*
| Years | Team | Apps | (Gls) |
| 2006–2008 | Anderlecht | 0 | (0) |
| 2007 | → Lierse (loan) | 14 | (1) |
| 2008 | → Kortrijk (loan) | 16 | (5) |
| 2008–2011 | Kortrijk | 100 | (10) |
| 2011–2013 | Heerenveen | 69 | (4) |
| 2013–2014 | Zulte Waregem | 29 | (4) |
| 2014–2016 | Gent | 65 | (14) |
| 2016–2017 | Watford | 0 | (0) |
| 2016–2017 | → Udinese (loan) | 29 | (0) |
| 2017–2020 | Anderlecht | 66 | (5) |
| 2019–2020 | → Gent (loan) | 22 | (1) |
| 2020–2025 | Gent | 163 | (9) |

International career
| 2005 | Belgium U18 | 3 | (1) |
| 2006–2007 | Belgium U19 | 6 | (0) |
| 2008–2009 | Belgium U20 | 2 | (0) |
| 2008–2010 | Belgium U21 | 12 | (1) |
- * Club domestic league appearances and goals

Sven Kums (born 26 February 1988) is a Belgian former professional footballer who played as a midfielder. He represented Belgium internationally at youth levels U18 through U21.

== Club career ==
=== Early career ===
Born in Asse, Kums began his career at Dilbeek Sport, before joining Anderlecht in 1996.

=== Anderlecht ===
He played in the youth and reserve teams for 10 years, and in 2006 he became part of the first team. In the first half of the 2006–07 season he did not feature in a single first team game. He was hoping to finally get a chance to play for Anderlecht's first team, but ended up playing for the second team every week.

==== Lierse (loan) ====
In January 2007, Kums moved to Lierse S.K. on loan. He made his debut in professional football on 10 February 2007 against FC Brussels. Kums played 14 games during his loan spell, scoring one goal. Lierse were relegated, and Kums returned to Anderlecht.

=== Kortrijk ===
In January 2008, he joined Second Division team K.V. Kortrijk on loan. There, Kums played 16 games, scoring 5 goals, helping KVK win the title and secure promotion to the Belgian Pro League. In June 2008, Kortrijk signed him to a permanent deal.

=== Heerenveen ===
In March 2011, Heerenveen announced that Kums would join their team for the 2011–12 season, the transfer fee was rumoured to be around €500.000. He played his first match in the Eredivisie on 6 August 2011 against NEC.

After two relatively successful seasons with Heerenveen, Kums returned to Belgium, signing a three-season deal with SV Zulte Waregem.

=== Zulte Waregem ===
He signed for Zulte Waregem in 2013. In one season for Essevee, he played 41 games, scoring 5 goals. The team finished 4th, and Kums' performances didn't go unnoticed.

=== Gent ===
On 1 July 2014, KAA Gent announced that Kums would join their squad that summer, signing a four-year contract. Kums had a successful season, and for the first time in club history, Ghent became Belgian champions.

=== Watford and Udinese ===
On 29 August 2016, Kums was sold to Watford but immediately sent on a season-long loan deal to Udinese.

=== Return to Anderlecht ===
On 2 June 2017, it was announced that Anderlecht acquired Kums from Watford. In his debut against Bayern Munich away in the UEFA Champions League, he was sent off after just 11 minutes.

=== Return to Gent ===
On 21 August 2019, Kums rejoined Gent on loan. His permanent transfer to the club was agreed upon on 20 January 2020. On 18 April 2022, he featured in the Belgian Cup final which ended in a 4–3 win on penalties over his former club Anderlecht. In May 2025, he announced his decision to retire from professional football at the end of the 2024–25 season.

== International career ==
On 5 September 2008, Kums made his debut for the Belgium U21 national team against Slovakia.

On 2 October 2015, senior national team coach Marc Wilmots announced that he would call up Kums, along with teammates Matz Sels and Laurent Depoitre, for the international games against Andorra and Israel.

== Personal life ==
His father Ludo Kums is youth coach at his current club R.S.C. Anderlecht.

== Career statistics ==
=== Club ===
As of match played 25 May 2025

Appearances and goals by club, season and competition
| Club | Season | League | | | National Cup (Note: Includes Belgian Cup, KNVB Cup) | | Europe | | Other | | Total | |
| Club | Season | Division | Apps | Goals | Apps | Goals | Apps | Goals | Apps | Goals | Apps | Goals |
|---|---|---|---|---|---|---|---|---|---|---|---|---|
| Lierse (loan) | 2006–07 | Belgian Pro League | 14 | 1 | 0 | 0 | — | | — | | 14 | 1 |
| Kortrijk (loan) | 2007–08 | Belgian Second Division | 16 | 5 | 2 | 0 | — | | — | | 18 | 5 |
| Kortrijk | 2008–09 | Belgian Pro League | 33 | 7 | 3 | 0 | — | | — | | 36 | 7 |
| Kortrijk | 2009–10 | Belgian Pro League | 29 | 1 | 4 | 0 | — | | 9 (Note: Appearance(s) in play-off) | 0 | 42 | 1 |
| Kortrijk | 2010–11 | Belgian Pro League | 28 | 2 | 2 | 0 | — | | 1 | 0 | 31 | 2 |
| Kortrijk | Kortrijk total | | 106 | 15 | 11 | 0 | — | | 10 | 0 | 127 | 15 |
| Heerenveen | 2011–12 | Eredivisie | 33 | 2 | 5 | 1 | — | | — | | 38 | 3 |
| Heerenveen | 2012–13 | Eredivisie | 32 | 2 | 3 | 0 | 4 (Note: Appearance(s) in UEFA Europa League) | 0 | — | | 39 | 2 |
| Heerenveen | 2013–14 | Eredivisie | 4 | 0 | 0 | 0 | — | | — | | 4 | 0 |
| Heerenveen | Total | | 69 | 4 | 8 | 1 | 4 | 0 | — | | 81 | 5 |
| Zulte Waregem | 2013–14 | Belgian Pro League | 21 | 3 | 6 | 1 | 6 | 0 | 8 | 1 | 41 | 5 |
| Gent | 2014–15 | Belgian Pro League | 17 | 0 | 3 | 0 | — | | 9 | 1 | 29 | 1 |
| Gent | 2015–16 | Belgian Pro League | 30 | 12 | 4 | 1 | 8 (Note: Appearance(s) in UEFA Champions League) | 2 | 10 (Note: One appearance in the Belgian Super Cup, nine appearances and one goal in play-off) | 1 | 52 | 16 |
| Gent | 2016–17 | Belgian Pro League | 5 | 0 | 0 | 0 | 3 | 0 | — | | 8 | 0 |
| Gent | Total | | 52 | 12 | 7 | 1 | 11 | 2 | 19 | 2 | 89 | 17 |
| Udinese (loan) | 2016–17 | Serie A | 29 | 0 | 0 | 0 | — | | — | | 29 | 0 |
| Anderlecht | 2017–18 | Belgian Pro League | 25 | 0 | 2 | 0 | 5 | 0 | 11 (Note: One appearance in the Belgian Super Cup, ten appearances in play-off) | 0 | 43 | 0 |
| Anderlecht | 2018–19 | Belgian Pro League | 21 | 5 | 1 | 0 | 3 | 0 | 10 | 0 | 35 | 5 |
| Anderlecht | Total | | 46 | 5 | 3 | 0 | 8 | 0 | 21 | 0 | 78 | 5 |
| Gent | 2019–20 | Belgian Pro League | 22 | 1 | 1 | 0 | 9 | 0 | — | | 32 | 1 |
| Gent | 2020–21 | Belgian Pro League | 30 | 3 | 2 | 0 | 7 (Note: One appearance in the UEFA Champions League, six appearances in UEFA Europa League) | 0 | 6 | 0 | 45 | 3 |
| Gent | 2021–22 | Belgian Pro League | 32 | 0 | 5 | 1 | 11 (Note: Appearance(s) in UEFA Conference League) | 2 | 6 | 0 | 54 | 3 |
| Gent | 2022–23 | Belgian Pro League | 32 | 2 | 1 | 0 | 13 (Note: Two appearances in the UEFA Europa League, eleven appearances and one goal in UEFA Conference League) | 1 | 7 (Note: One appearance in the Belgian Super Cup, six appearances and one goal in play-off) | 1 | 53 | 4 |
| Gent | 2023–24 | Belgian Pro League | 23 | 1 | 3 | 1 | 12 | 0 | 7 (Note: Appearances in play-off) | 0 | 45 | 2 |
| Gent | 2024–25 | Belgian Pro League | 23 | 2 | 1 | 0 | 12 | 1 | 0 | 0 | 37 | 3 |
| Gent | Total | | 163 | 9 | 13 | 2 | 64 | 4 | 26 | 1 | 266 | 16 |
| Career total | | | 500 | 49 | 48 | 5 | 93 | 6 | 84 | 4 | 725 | 64 |

== Honours ==
Gent

- Belgian Pro League: 2014–15
- Belgian Cup: 2021–22
- Belgian Super Cup: 2015

Anderlecht

- Belgian Super Cup: 2017

Individual

- UEFA Champions League Team of the Group Stage: 2015
- Belgian Golden Shoe: 2015
- Honorary Citizen of Dilbeek: 2016
