= Davy Roef =

Belgian footballer

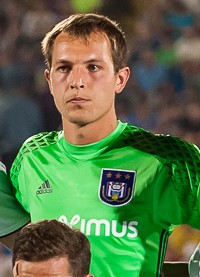

Personal information
- Date of birth: 6 February 1994 (age 32)
- Place of birth: Antwerp, Belgium
- Height: 1.87 m (6 ft 2 in)
- Position: Goalkeeper

Team information
- Current team: Gent
- Number: 33

Youth career
- KFCO Beerschot Wilrijk
- Beerschot AC
- 2007–2012: Anderlecht

Senior career*
Years	Team	Apps	(Gls)
2012–2020	Anderlecht	18	(0)
2017	→ Deportivo La Coruña (loan)	1	(0)
2017–2019	→ Waasland-Beveren (loan)	60	(0)
2020–	Gent	129	(0)

International career^{‡}
2010	Belgium U16	2	(0)
2012–2013	Belgium U19	4	(0)
2015–2017	Belgium U21	8	(0)
- * Club domestic league appearances and goals as of 25 October 2026 ‡ National team caps and goals as of 20:44, 26 October 2023 (UTC)

Davy Roef (born 6 February 1994) is a Belgian professional footballer who plays as a goalkeeper for Gent.

== Club career ==
=== Early career ===
Roef spent time with several clubs in his youth, such as Beerschot AC, KFCO Beerschot Wilrijk, and Anderlecht.

=== Anderlecht ===
Roef was a graduate of the Anderlecht academy, and made his senior league debut in a 2–1 loss to Mechelen. He replaced an injured Silvio Proto after 39 minutes.

=== Deportivo La Coruña (loan) ===
In January 2017, Roef was loaned out to Deportivo La Coruña. He struggled to break into the team while at Deportivo however, and it got worse for him after suffering an ankle injury in training. He made one league appearance for them, coming on 20 May 2017 in a 3–0 win over Las Palmas.

=== Waasland-Beveren (loan) ===
Following the expiry of his loan in June, Roef was loaned out again, this time to Waasland-Beveren. He made his league debut on 26 August 2017 in a 1–0 loss to Sint-Truiden.

== International career ==
Roef has been capped at U19 level by Belgium twice. He was called up to the senior Belgium squad for the UEFA Nations League matches against Denmark and Iceland in September 2020.

== Career statistics ==
As of match played 25 October 2026

Appearances and goals by club, season and competition
Club	Season	League			Belgian Cup		Europe		Other		Total	
Club	Season	Division	Apps	Goals	Apps	Goals	Apps	Goals	Apps	Goals	Apps	Goals
Anderlecht	2012–13	Belgian Pro League	0	0	0	0	0	0	0	0	0	0
Anderlecht	2013–14	Belgian Pro League	1	0	0	0	0	0	0	0	1	0
Anderlecht	2014–15	Belgian Pro League	2	0	3	0	1 (Note: Appearance in UEFA Champions League)	0	0	0	6	0
Anderlecht	2015–16	Belgian Pro League	0	0	2	0	0	0	—		2	0
Anderlecht	2016–17	Belgian Pro League	15	0	1	0	9 (Note: Two appearances in UEFA Champions League, seven in UEFA Europa League)	0	—		22	0
Anderlecht	2019–20	Belgian Pro League	0	0	0	0	0	0	—		0	0
Anderlecht	Total		18	0	6	0	10	0	—		34	0
Deportivo La Coruña	2016–17	La Liga	1	0	—		—		—		1	0
Beveren	2017–18	Belgian Pro League	30	0	3	0	—		—		33	0
Beveren	2018–19	Belgian Pro League	30	0	0	0	—		—		30	0
Beveren	Total		60	0	3	0	—		—		63	0
Gent	2020–21	Belgian Pro League	6	0	1	0	6 (Note: Three appearances in UEFA Champions League, three appearances in UEFA Europa League)	0	—		13	0
Gent	2021–22	Belgian Pro League	14	0	2	0	4 (Note: Appearances in UEFA Conference League)	0	—		20	0
Gent	2022–23	Belgian Pro League	11	0	1	0	9 (Note: Two appearances in UEFA Europa League, seven appearances in UEFA Conference League)	0	1 (Note: Appearance in Belgian Super Cup)	0	22	0
Gent	2023–24	Belgian Pro League	22	0	3	0	12 (Note: Appearances in UEFA Conference League)	0	—		37	0
Gent	2024–25	Belgian Pro League	26	0	0	0	12	0	—		39	0
Gent	2025–26	Belgian Pro League	40	0	3	0	—		—		43	0
Gent	2026–27	Belgian Pro League	9	0	0	0	8	0	—		17	0
Gent	Total		129	0	10	0	51	0	1	0	191	0
Career total			208	0	19	0	61	0	1	0	289	0

== Honours ==
Gent

- Belgian Cup: 2021–22
