= Matisse Samoise =

Belgian footballer

- Samoise in 2026 with Gent

Personal information
- Date of birth: 21 November 2001 (age 24)
- Place of birth: Ghent, Belgium
- Height: 1.80 m (5 ft 11 in)
- Position: Midfielder

Team information
- Current team: Gent
- Number: 18

Youth career
- –2020: Gent

Senior career*
Years	Team	Apps	(Gls)
2020–	Gent	162	(13)

International career^{‡}
2022–	Belgium U21	4	(0)
- * Club domestic league appearances and goals as of 27 December 2025 ‡ National team caps and goals as of 20:32, 27 March 2023 (UTC)

Matisse Samoise (born 21 November 2001) is a Belgian professional footballer who plays as a midfielder for Belgian side Gent.

== Career ==
Samoise began his career in Gent's youth setup. On 29 September 2020, he made his senior debut under the guidance of manager Wim De Decker during the Champions League qualifying game against Dynamo Kyiv, in which he replaced Laurent Depoitre in the 74th minute. A day later, he signed a new contract at Gent until 2022, with the option of an extra year. Later that week, on 4 October, he scored his first goal as a professional player during his first professional senior match.

He made his first start on 3 February 2021 in the cup game against KFC Heur-Tongeren, scoring a goal and providing an assist.

== Career statistics ==
As of match played 27 December 2025

Club	Season	League			Cup		Continental		Other		Total	
Club	Season	Division	Apps	Goals	Apps	Goals	Apps	Goals	Apps	Goals	Apps	Goals
Gent	2020–21	Belgian Pro League	9	1	1	1	1	0	—		11	2
Gent	2021–22	Belgian Pro League	32	2	5	0	8	0	—		45	2
Gent	2022–23	Belgian Pro League	33	2	2	0	11	0	1	0	47	2
Gent	2023–24	Belgian Pro League	39	6	3	0	11	1	—		53	7
Gent	2024–25	Belgian Pro League	31	0	0	0	10	0	—		41	0
Gent	2025–26	Belgian Pro League	18	2	2	1	0	0	—		20	3
Gent	Total		162	13	13	2	41	1	1	0	217	16
Career total			162	13	13	2	41	1	1	0	217	16

== Honours ==
Gent

- Belgian Cup: 2021–22
