= Yari Stevens =

Belgian footballer

Personal information
- Full name: Yari Stevens
- Date of birth: 18 December 2003 (age 22)
- Place of birth: Belgium
- Position: Right back

Team information
- Current team: Union SG U23
- Number: 2

Youth career
- –2020: Club Brugge
- 2021–2022: Gent

Senior career*
Years	Team	Apps	(Gls)
2020–2021	Club NXT	4	(0)
2022–2024	Jong Gent	39	(0)
2024–	Union SG U23	26	(2)

International career
2020	Belgium U17	4	(0)
- * Club domestic league appearances and goals as of 6 June 2025

Yari Stevens (born 18 December 2003) is a Belgian professional footballer who plays as a right-back for Belgian National Division 1 side Union SG U23.

== Club career ==
Stevens began his career at the youth academy of Club Brugge. On 22 January 2021, Stevens made his debut for Brugge's reserve side, Club NXT in the Belgian First Division B against Lommel United.

== Career statistics ==
As of match played 25 January 2021

Appearances and goals by club, season and competition
Club	Season	League			Cup		Continental		Total	
Club	Season	Division	Apps	Goals	Apps	Goals	Apps	Goals	Apps	Goals
Club NXT	2020–21	Belgian First Division B	2	0	—	—	—	—	2	0
Career total			2	0	0	0	0	0	2	0
