= Bram Lagae =

Belgian footballer (born 2004)

Personal information
- Date of birth: 14 January 2004 (age 22)
- Place of birth: Belgium
- Height: 1.77 m (5 ft 10 in)
- Position: Defender

Team information
- Current team: Dunkerque
- Number: 4

Youth career
- –2022: Gent

Senior career*
Years	Team	Apps	(Gls)
2022–2026	Jong Gent	52	(2)
2023–2026	Gent	5	(0)
2024	→ Dunkerque (loan)	15	(0)
2024–2025	→ Kortrijk (loan)	23	(1)
2026–	Dunkerque	7	(0)

International career^{‡}
2019–2020	Belgium U16	7	(0)
2020	Belgium U17	1	(0)
2021–2022	Belgium U18	3	(0)
2021–2023	Belgium U19	7	(0)
2023	Belgium U20	2	(0)
2025–	Belgium U21	2	(0)
- * Club domestic league appearances and goals as of 11 May 2026 ‡ National team caps and goals as of 10:20, 1 September 2025 (UTC)

Bram Lagae (born 14 January 2004) is a Belgian professional footballer who plays as a defender for French Ligue 2 club Dunkerque.

== Club career ==
Lagae made his debut with Gent in the Belgian Pro League in 2023. In January 2024, he was loaned out to Ligue 2 club Dunkerque. On 1 August 2024, Lagae moved on a new loan to Kortrijk.

On 23 January 2026, Lagae signed a two-and-a-half-year contract to return to Dunkerque.
