= Laurent Depoitre =

Belgian footballer

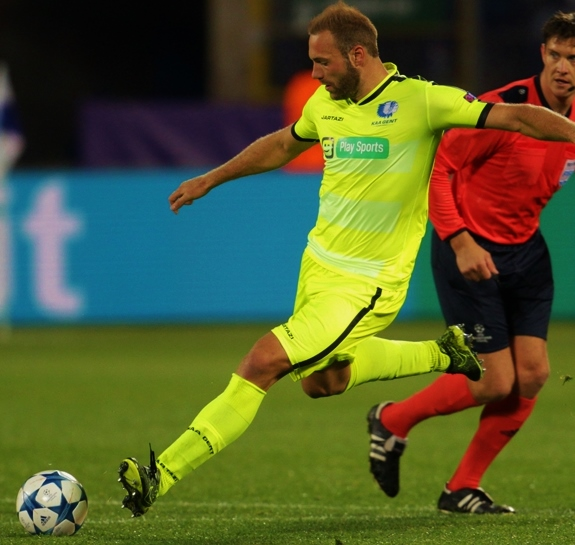
- Depoitre playing for Gent in 2015

Personal information
- Full name: Laurent Depoitre
- Date of birth: 7 December 1988 (age 37)
- Place of birth: Tournai, Belgium
- Height: 1.91 m (6 ft 3 in)
- Position: Striker

Youth career
- 1995–2001: AS Montkainoise
- 2001–2003: Excelsior Moeskroen
- 2003–2005: R.F.C. Tournai

Senior career*
Years	Team	Apps	(Gls)
2005–2007	R.F.C. Tournai	31	(12)
2007–2009	RRC Péruwelz	43	(16)
2009–2012	Eendracht Aalst	69	(25)
2012–2014	KV Oostende	62	(20)
2014–2016	Gent	58	(24)
2016–2017	Porto	7	(1)
2017–2019	Huddersfield Town	56	(6)
2019–2024	Gent	110	(28)
Total		436	(132)

International career^{‡}
2015	Belgium	1	(1)
- * Club domestic league appearances and goals as of 2 June 2024 ‡ National team caps and goals as of 21:08, 9 May 2018 (UTC)

Laurent Depoitre (born 7 December 1988) is a retired Belgian professional footballer who played as a striker. He made one senior appearance for the Belgium national team.

== Club career ==
=== Eendracht Aalst ===
When a large number of players had to leave Péruwelz after the 2008–09 season, Eendracht Aalst took advantage of the situation in the summer of 2009 and signed Depoitre alongside Damien Galucci and Olivier De Castro. Depoitre formed a good pair in Alost with Wouter Moreels, and he was chosen as the best player of the team after his first season. 2011, the team became champion in Third Division A. In the 2011–12 season Depoitre was followed by, among other clubs, AA Gent, Lierse SK, Oud-Heverlee Leuven, Beerschot AC, N.E.C., Heerenveen, Willem II and Roda JC.

=== Oostende ===
In 2012, Depoitre joined Oostende from Aalst.

In January 2013, it was announced that he would be transferred to Zulte Waregem in 2013–14. Afterwards, his transfer turned out to be a part of a share transaction between Yves Lejaeghere, the then-president of Ostend, and Patrick Decuyper, the then-general manager of Zulte Waregem. In the end the transaction was cancelled and as a result the transfer was also revoked.

=== Gent ===
After Depoitre decided not to extend his contract with Oostende, it was announced that he would play for KAA Gent during the 2014–2015 season.

=== Porto ===
On 8 August 2016, Depoitre signed for Portuguese club Porto for four seasons, with €40 million release fee. Porto paid a €6 million transfer fee to Gent. He finished the season with 13 appearances across all competitions scoring two goals and providing one assist.

=== Huddersfield Town ===
On 23 June 2017, it was confirmed that Depoitre had signed a two-year contract with Premier League newcomers Huddersfield Town, for an undisclosed fee, and a record transfer fee for the club. However, his transfer fee record would go on to be overtaken later that transfer window, by Aaron Mooy moving from Manchester City for £8 million.

He was released by Huddersfield at the end of the 2018–19 season, having scored six times in sixty appearances for the club, including the winning goal in Huddersfield's 2–1 victory over Manchester United and the goal v Chelsea at Stamford Bridge to secure a draw against the then-champions and with it the point that kept Huddersfield in the Premier League for a second season.

=== Return to Gent ===
On 23 July 2019, Depoitre returned to Belgium, signing for his former club Gent on a three-year contract.

== International career ==
On 10 October 2015, he made his senior debut for the national team in a 4–1 win in a UEFA Euro 2016 qualification match against Andorra. Depoitre scored his team's fourth goal.

== Career statistics ==
=== Club ===
As of match played 6 December 2020

Club	Season	League			National Cup		Europe		Other		Total	
Club	Season	Division	Apps	Goals	Apps	Goals	Apps	Goals	Apps	Goals	Apps	Goals
Aalst	2009–10	Belgian Third Division			1	0	—				1	0
Aalst	2010–11	Belgian Third Division	14	8	2	1	—		—		16	9
Aalst	2011–12	Belgian Second Division	33	8	—		—		—		33	8
Aalst	Total		47	16	3	1	–		–		50	17
Oostende	2012–13	Belgian Second Division	34	14	5	2	—		—		39	16
Oostende	2013–14	Belgian Pro League	28	6	6	3	—		3	2	37	11
Oostende	Total		62	20	11	5	–		3	2	76	27
Gent	2014–15	Belgian Pro League	29	12	5	1	—		6	1	40	14
Gent	2015–16	Belgian Pro League	27	12	5	1	7 (Note: Appearance(s) in UEFA Champions League)	1	8	2	47	16
Gent	2016–17	Belgian First Division A	2	0	—		2 (Note: One appearance in UEFA Champions League, one appearance and one goal in UEFA Europa League)	1	—		4	1
Gent	Total		58	24	10	2	9	2	14	3	91	31
Porto	2016–17	Primeira Liga	7	1	5	1	1	0	—		13	2
Huddersfield Town	2017–18	Premier League	33	6	1	0	–		1 (Note: Appearance in EFL Cup)	0	35	6
Huddersfield Town	2018–19	Premier League	23	0	1	0	–		1	0	25	0
Huddersfield Town	Total		56	6	2	0	–		2	0	60	6
Gent	2019–20	Belgian First Division A	22	8	1	0	12 (Note: Appearances in UEFA Europa League)	7	—		35	15
Gent	2020–21	Belgian First Division A	23	2	1	0	4 (Note: Three appearances in UEFA Champions League, one appearance in UEFA Europa League)	0	—		28	2
Gent	2021–22	Belgian First Division A	25	10	4	1	13 (Note: Appearances in UEFA Europa Conference League)	1	—		42	12
Gent	Total		70	20	6	1	29	8	—		105	29
Career total			347	89	37	10	39	10	19	5	442	114

=== International ===
Team	Year	Apps	Goals
Belgium	2015	1	1
Total		1	1

Statistics accurate as of last match played on 10 October 2015.

Scores and results list Belgium's goal tally first.

No.	Date	Venue	Opponent	Score	Result	Competition
1.	10 October 2015	Estadi Nacional, Andorra la Vella, Andorra	Andorra	4–1	4–1	Euro 2016 qualifier

== Honours ==
Aalst

- Belgian Third Division: 2010–11

Oostende

- Belgian Second Division: 2012–13

Gent

- Belgian Pro League: 2014–15
- Belgian Cup: 2021–22
- Belgian Super Cup: 2015

Individual

- Jean-Claude Bouvy Trophy: 2015
