= UEFA Conference League =

European association football tournament

- Organiser(s): UEFA
- Founded: 2021; 5 years ago (rebranded in 2024)
- Region: Europe
- Teams: 36 (league phase); 184 (total)
- Qualifier for: UEFA Europa League
- Related competitions: UEFA Champions League (1st tier); UEFA Europa League (2nd tier)
- Current champions: (England) Crystal Palace (1st title)
- Most championships: (Italy) Roma (England) West Ham United (Greece) Olympiacos (England) Chelsea (England) Crystal Palace (1 title each)
- Website: www.uefa.com/uefaconferenceleague/
- 2026–27 UEFA Conference League

The UEFA Conference League (UECL), (Note: Despite the competition having been renamed from UEFA Europa Conference League to UEFA Conference League, the official abbreviation remains UECL, in order to disambiguate from the UEFA Champions League, which already uses "UCL" as an abbreviation.) known simply as the Conference League, is an annual football competition organised since 2021 by the Union of European Football Associations (UEFA) for eligible European clubs. It is the third-tier competition of European club football, ranking below the second-tier UEFA Europa League, and the first-tier UEFA Champions League.

The competition was intended as the lowest level of the UEFA Europa League and named the UEFA Europa League 2 as a working title. It was then renamed to the UEFA Europa Conference League, before its current name was adopted. Teams from lower-ranked UEFA member associations primarily contest the competition. From the 2024–25 season, the competition was rebranded to the UEFA Conference League, and the group stage was replaced with an expanded league phase of 36 teams. No teams qualify directly for the league phase; instead, the teams eliminated in the Europa League play-off round qualify, with the rest coming from the Conference League qualifying and play-off rounds.

The winner of the competition qualifies for the following season's UEFA Europa League league phase, unless qualified for the Champions League via their domestic league position. In that case, the Conference League champion has the right to choose the competition. English clubs have the most wins, with three, followed by Italy and Greece with one each. Roma were the inaugural winners of the competition, having beaten Feyenoord 1–0 in the 2022 final. The current title holders are Crystal Palace, who defeated Rayo Vallecano 1–0 in the 2026 final.

== History ==
Winners UEFA Conference League
Season	Winners
UEFA Europa Conference League
2021–22	(Italy) Roma
2022–23	(England) West Ham United
2023–24	(Greece) Olympiacos
UEFA Conference League
2024–25	(England) Chelsea
2025–26	(England) Crystal Palace

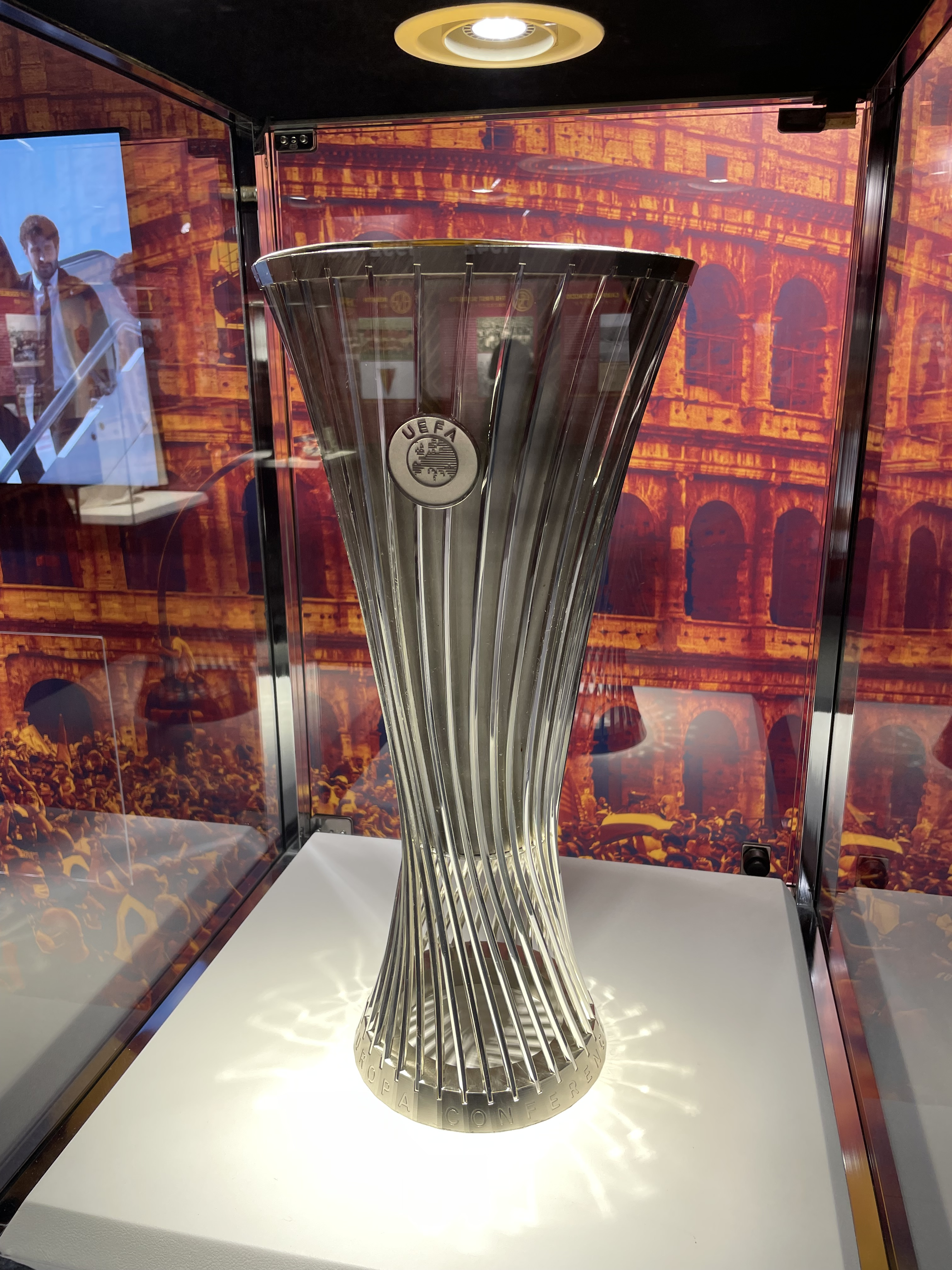
The UEFA Conference League trophy on display in Rome

UEFA had reportedly considered adding a third-tier competition since at least 2015, believing that a bottom-level tournament could act as a means of giving clubs from lower-ranked UEFA member countries a chance of progressing beyond their customary elimination from the Champions League and Europa League. In mid-2018, talk of an announcement intensified, with news sources claiming an agreement had already been reached for the competition to be launched and that the 48-team Europa League group stage would be split in two, with the lower half forming the nucleus of what would be the new event.

On 2 December 2018, UEFA announced that the competition – provisionally known as "Europa League 2" or just "UEL2" – was to be launched as part of the 2021–24 three-year competition cycle, with UEFA adding that the new tournament would bring "more matches for more clubs and more associations".

The original official name of the competition, "UEFA Europa Conference League", was announced on 24 September 2019.

On 24 May 2021, UEFA revealed the competition's trophy and brand identity. The Europa Conference League Trophy stands 57.5 cm (22.6 in) tall and weighs 11 kg (24 lb).

The first goal in the then-named Europa Conference League qualifiers was scored on 6 July 2021 by Mosta player Evo Chris in a 2021–22 qualifying round match against Spartak Trnava. The first goal in the then-named Europa Conference League group stage was scored on 14 September 2021 by Maccabi Tel Aviv player Stipe Perica in a 2021–22 group stage match against Alashkert. On 30 September 2021, the competition's first hat-trick was scored by Harry Kane for Tottenham Hotspur in a group stage match against Mura. Kane came on as a 59th minute substitute at 2–1 before scoring three goals within 20 minutes of each other to finish off the game (5–1).

On 5 May 2022, Feyenoord and Roma became the first teams ever to reach the Europa Conference League final, ending with Roma being crowned the inaugural champions.

On 3 November 2022, West Ham United became the first side to win all six of their Europa Conference League group stage matches, picking up wins against FCSB, Silkeborg and Anderlecht. They went on to win the competition by defeating Fiorentina 2–1 in the 2023 final, in the process becoming the first side to finish the competition undefeated, with 12 wins and one draw.

On 28 June 2023, UEFA announced that the competition would be renamed to the UEFA Conference League from the 2024–25 season onwards. According to UEFA, removing 'Europa' from the name of the competition would enable further development as a stand-alone competition in their research amongst fans and commercial partners. In the same season, the 32-team group stage was replaced with a 36-team league phase, in line with similar changes made to the UEFA Champions League and UEFA Europa League.

In the 2024 final, Olympiacos beat Fiorentina 1–0, becoming the first Greek club to win a major European trophy.

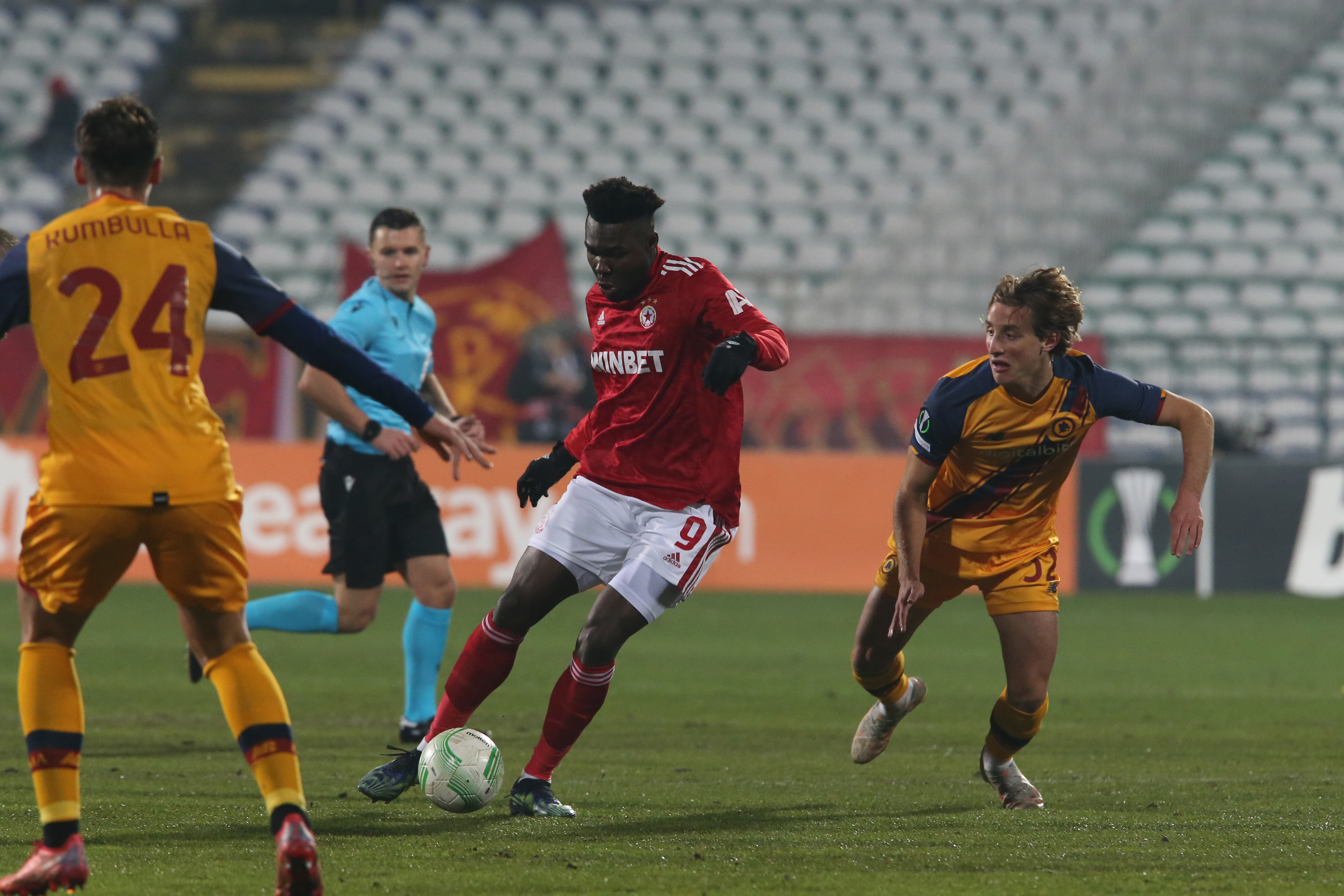
A match between CSKA Sofia and Roma in the inaugural 2021–22 season

== Trophy ==
The Conference League trophy, designed by Pentagram, is made from brass, with galvanic steel and silver plating. It features 32 hexagonal columns, to represent the 32 teams in the original group stage, curving upwards in a manner intended to resemble a football curling through the air towards the goal.

== Format ==
=== Qualification ===
Map of UEFA associations whose teams reached the group stage/league stage of the UEFA Conference League UEFA member association that has been represented in the group stage/league phase UEFA member association that has not been represented in the group stage/league phase Not a UEFA member

UEFA countries, stages reached by teams in the UEFA Conference League: UEFA member nation with winning clubs UEFA member nation with runner-up clubs UEFA member nation that has been represented in the semi-final UEFA member nation that has been represented in the round of 16 or quarter-final UEFA member nation that has been represented in the group stage or play-offs UEFA member nation that has not been represented in the group stage Not a UEFA member

Similar to the UEFA Champions League, qualification to the Conference League is split into two paths – separating champions and non-champions – and contains three rounds plus a play-off. However, unlike the Champions League, the Champions Path will only be contested by teams eliminated from Champions League qualifying and consequently relegated either directly into the Conference League (Note: From Champions League first qualifying round to Conference League second qualifying round.) or via a second relegation from the UEFA Europa League as a result of two straight eliminations. (Note: From Champions League second qualifying round to Europa League third qualifying round, and then to Conference League play-off round.)

The association ranking based on the UEFA country coefficients is used to determine the number of participating teams in main path qualification for each association: (Note: Excluding three relegations from Europa League third qualifying round out of five runners-up from associations 10–15 and three cup winners from associations 13–15.)

- Nations ranked 1 to 5 have one team;
- Nations ranked 6 to 15 have two teams;
- Nations ranked 16 to 50 have three teams;
- Nations ranked 51 to 55 have two teams;
- Liechtenstein does not have a domestic league and will provide the winner of the Liechtenstein Football Cup irrespective of their coefficient ranking.

Based on this reorganisation, no association benefits from more berths to continental football than they had before the 2021–24 competition cycle, with the tournament essentially being the lower orders of the previous Europa League tournament split off into a secondary tournament.

=== League phase and knockout phase ===
The format involves a league phase and a knockout phase consisting of preliminary knockout play-offs, followed by a round of 16, quarter-finals, semi-finals and final (all of the knockout matches except the final are played over two legs). The top eight teams from the league phase receive a bye to the round of 16, while the teams ranked 9th to 24th contest the knockout play-offs with the winners advancing to the round of 16. The teams ranked 25th to 36th in the league phase and the losers of the play-offs are eliminated from the competition.

The final is played at a neutral venue. The winner of the competition is entitled to participate in the UEFA Europa League league phase the following season. The competition's matches are usually played on Thursdays.

=== Distribution (from 2024–25) ===
		Teams entering in this round	Teams advancing from previous round	Teams transferred from Champions League	Teams transferred from Europa League
First qualifying round (58 teams)		17 domestic cup winners from associations 39–55; 21 domestic league runners-up from associations 34–55 (except Liechtenstein); 20 domestic league third-placed teams from associations 30–50 (except Liechtenstein)			
Second qualifying round	Champions (16 teams)			16 teams eliminated from Champions League first qualifying round	
Second qualifying round	Non-champions (88 teams)	5 domestic cup winners from associations 34–38; 18 domestic league runners-up from associations 16–33; 17 domestic league third-placed teams from associations 13–29; 9 domestic league fourth-placed teams from associations 7–15; 1 domestic league fifth-placed team from association 6	29 winners from the first qualifying round		9 teams eliminated from Europa League first qualifying round
Third qualifying round	Champions (8 teams)		8 winners from the second qualifying round for champions		
Third qualifying round	Non-champions (52 teams)		44 winners from the second qualifying round for non-champions		8 teams eliminated from Europa League second qualifying round
Play-off round	Champions (10 teams)		4 winners from the third qualifying round for champions		6 teams eliminated from Europa League third qualifying round for champions
Play-off round	Non-champions (38 teams)	5 domestic league sixth-placed teams from associations 1–5 (EFL Cup winners for England)	26 winners from the third qualifying round for non-champions		7 teams eliminated from Europa League third qualifying round for non-champions
League phase (36 teams)			5 winners from the play-off round for champions; 19 winners from the play-off round for non-champions		12 teams eliminated from Europa League play-off round

Changes will be made to the access list above if the Conference League title holder qualifies for the tournament via their domestic leagues.

- If the Conference League title holders qualify for the league phase via their domestic league's standard berth allocation, the best-ranked club in the qualifying rounds enter the league phase, without leapfrogging, then clubs of associations in the UEFA coefficient ranking are promoted to later qualifying rounds, and teams of the highest-ranked associations in earlier rounds are also promoted accordingly.
- If the Conference League title holders qualify for the qualifying rounds via their domestic league, their spot in the qualifying rounds is vacated, and teams of the highest-ranked associations in earlier rounds are promoted accordingly.

== Prize money ==
Similar to the UEFA Champions League and UEFA Europa League, the prize money received by the clubs is divided into fixed payments based on participation and results, and variable amounts that depend on the value of their TV market.

For the 2024–25 season, League Phase participation in the Conference League was awarded a base fee of €3,170,000. A victory in the group pays €400,000 and a draw €133,000. Teams which placed in the top 8 of the League Phase earned €400,000 and progressed automatically to the Round of 16. Teams which placed between 9th and 24th qualified for the knockout round play-offs and earned €200,000. Reaching the knock-out stage triggered additional bonuses: €800,000 for the round of 16, €1,300,000 for the quarter-finals and €2,500,000 for the semi-finals. The losing finalists received €4,000,000 and the champions received €7,000,000.

- First qualifying round elimination: €150,000 + €175,000 per qualifying round played
- Second qualifying round elimination: €350,000 + €175,000 per qualifying round played
- Third qualifying round elimination: €550,000 + €175,000 per qualifying round played
- Play-off round elimination: €750,000 + €175,000 per qualifying round played
- Qualified to League Phase: €3,170,000
- Match won in League Phase: €400,000
- Match drawn in League Phase: €133,000
- 1st–8th in League Phase: €400,000
- 9th–24th in League Phase: €200,000
- Round of 16: €800,000
- Quarter-finals: €1,300,000
- Semi-finals: €2,500,000
- Runners-up: €4,000,000
- Winners: €7,000,000

Additionally, each domestic champion not qualifying for the League Phase of any tournament received an additional €260,000.

Each club that qualifies for the League Phase will also receive a bonus payment based on their league ranking. The total amount initially available for the league ranking bonus is €18,648,000 divided into 666 equal shares of €28,000. As €400,000 is available for each match played in the league phase, for every draw in the League Phase, €133,000 is unallocated and is added to the total league ranking bonus fund, increasing the value of each share. The team that finishes 1st in the League Phase receives 36 shares, with the amount of shares received falling by 1 for each subsequent position, with the 36th place team receiving a single share.

== Records and statistics ==
=== Performances by club ===
Performance in the UEFA Conference League by club
Club	Winners	Runners-up	Years won	Years runner-up
(Italy) Roma	1	0	2022	—
(England) West Ham United	1	0	2023	—
(Greece) Olympiacos	1	0	2024	—
(England) Chelsea	1	0	2025	—
(England) Crystal Palace	1	0	2026	—
(Italy) Fiorentina	0	2	—	2023, 2024
(Netherlands) Feyenoord	0	1	—	2022
(Spain) Real Betis	0	1	—	2025
(Spain) Rayo Vallecano	0	1	—	2026

=== Performances by nation ===
Performance in finals by nation
Nation	Winners	Runners-up	Total
England	3	0	3
Italy	1	2	3
Greece	1	0	1
Spain	0	2	2
Netherlands	0	1	1

=== Number of participating clubs ===
The following is a list of clubs that have played in or qualified for the Conference League league phase (group stage prior to the 2024–25 season). Season in bold represents teams that qualified for the knockout phase that season. In the first three seasons, the eight group winners as well as the eight play-off winners are considered to be qualified. Starting from the 2024–25 season with the introduction of a league phase, the top eight as well as the eight play-off winners are considered to be qualified.

Nation	No.	Clubs	Seasons
Czech Republic (7)	2	Slavia Prague	**2021–22**, 2022–23
Czech Republic (7)	2	Jablonec	2021–22, 2026–27
Czech Republic (7)	1	Slovácko	2022–23
Czech Republic (7)	1	Viktoria Plzeň	**2023–24**
Czech Republic (7)	1	Mladá Boleslav	2024–25
Czech Republic (7)	1	Sigma Olomouc	**2025–26**
Czech Republic (7)	1	Sparta Prague	**2025–26**
Belgium (6)	5	Gent	**2021–22**, **2022–23**, **2023–24**, 2024–25, 2026–27
Belgium (6)	1	Anderlecht	**2022–23**
Belgium (6)	1	Club Brugge	**2023–24**
Belgium (6)	1	Genk	2023–24
Belgium (6)	1	Cercle Brugge	**2024–25**
Belgium (6)	1	Sint-Truiden	2026–27
Denmark (6)	3	Copenhagen	**2021–22**, **2024–25**, 2026–27
Denmark (6)	2	Nordsjælland	2023–24, 2026–27
Denmark (6)	1	Randers	**2021–22**
Denmark (6)	1	Silkeborg	2022–23
Denmark (6)	1	AGF	2026–27
Denmark (6)	1	Midtjylland	2026–27
Cyprus (6)	3	Omonia	2021–22, 2024–25, 2025–26
Cyprus (6)	2	Pafos	**2024–25**, 2026–27
Cyprus (6)	1	Anorthosis	2021–22
Cyprus (6)	1	Apollon Limassol	2022–23
Cyprus (6)	1	APOEL	2024–25
Cyprus (6)	1	AEK Larnaca	**2025–26**
Turkey (6)	2	İstanbul Başakşehir	**2022–23**, 2024–25
Turkey (6)	1	Sivasspor	**2022–23**
Turkey (6)	1	Beşiktaş	2023–24
Turkey (6)	1	Fenerbahçe	**2023–24**
Turkey (6)	1	Samsunspor	**2025–26**
Turkey (6)	1	Trabzonspor	2026–27
England (6)	1	Tottenham Hotspur	2021–22
England (6)	1	West Ham United	**2022–23**
England (6)	1	Aston Villa	**2023–24**
England (6)	1	Chelsea	**2024–25**
England (6)	1	Crystal Palace	**2025–26**
England (6)	1	Brighton & Hove Albion	2026–27
Germany (6)	1	Union Berlin	2021–22
Germany (6)	1	1. FC Köln	2022–23
Germany (6)	1	Eintracht Frankfurt	**2023–24**
Germany (6)	1	1. FC Heidenheim	2024–25
Germany (6)	1	Mainz 05	**2025–26**
Germany (6)	1	SC Freiburg	2026–27
Netherlands (5)	4	AZ	**2021–22**, **2022–23**, 2023–24, **2025–26**
Netherlands (5)	1	Feyenoord	**2021–22**
Netherlands (5)	1	Vitesse	**2021–22**
Netherlands (5)	1	Ajax	2026–27
Netherlands (5)	1	Twente	2026–27
Switzerland (5)	3	Lugano	2023–24, **2024–25**, 2026–27
Switzerland (5)	2	Basel	**2021–22**, **2022–23**
Switzerland (5)	1	St. Gallen	2024–25
Switzerland (5)	1	Lausanne-Sport	2025–26
Switzerland (5)	1	Thun	2026–27
France (5)	1	Rennes	**2021–22**
France (5)	1	Nice	**2022–23**
France (5)	1	Lille	**2023–24**
France (5)	1	Strasbourg	**2025–26**
France (5)	1	Monaco	2026–27
Poland (4)	3	Legia Warsaw	**2023–24**, **2024–25**, 2025–26
Poland (4)	2	Lech Poznań	**2022–23**, **2025–26**
Poland (4)	2	Jagiellonia Białystok	**2024–25**, 2025–26
Poland (4)	1	Raków Częstochowa	**2025–26**
Serbia (4)	2	Partizan	**2021–22**, **2022–23**
Serbia (4)	1	Čukarički	2023–24
Serbia (4)	1	TSC	2024–25
Serbia (4)	1	Red Star Belgrade	2026–27
Ukraine (4)	2	Zorya Luhansk	2021–22, 2023–24
Ukraine (4)	1	Dnipro-1	**2022–23**
Ukraine (4)	1	Dynamo Kyiv	2025–26
Ukraine (4)	1	Shakhtar Donetsk	**2025–26**
Spain (4)	1	Villarreal	**2022–23**
Spain (4)	1	Real Betis	**2024–25**
Spain (4)	1	Rayo Vallecano	**2025–26**
Spain (4)	1	Getafe	2026–27
Italy (3)	4	Fiorentina	**2022–23**, **2023–24**, **2024–25**, **2025–26**
Italy (3)	1	Roma	**2021–22**
Italy (3)	1	Atalanta	2026–27
Norway (3)	2	Bodø/Glimt	**2021–22**, **2023–24**
Norway (3)	2	Molde	2022–23, **2024–25**
Norway (3)	1	Brann	2026–27
Greece (3)	2	PAOK	**2021–22**, **2023–24**
Greece (3)	2	Panathinaikos	**2024–25**, 2026–27
Greece (3)	1	AEK Athens	**2025–26**
Austria (3)	2	LASK	**2021–22**, 2024–25
Austria (3)	2	Rapid Wien	**2024–25**, 2025–26
Austria (3)	1	Austria Wien	2022–23
Slovenia (3)	2	Olimpija Ljubljana	2023–24, 2024–25
Slovenia (3)	2	Celje	**2024–25**, **2025–26**
Slovenia (3)	1	Mura	2021–22
Romania (3)	2	CFR Cluj	2021–22, **2022–23**
Romania (3)	2	Universitatea Craiova	2025–26, 2026–27
Romania (3)	1	FCSB	2022–23
Armenia (3)	2	Noah	2024–25, 2025–26
Armenia (3)	1	Alashkert	2021–22
Armenia (3)	1	Pyunik	2022–23
Sweden (3)	2	Djurgårdens IF	**2022–23**, **2024–25**
Sweden (3)	1	BK Häcken	2025–26
Sweden (3)	1	Mjällby AIF	2026–27
Israel (3)	2	Maccabi Tel Aviv	**2021–22**, **2023–24**
Israel (3)	1	Maccabi Haifa	2021–22
Israel (3)	1	Hapoel Be'er Sheva	2022–23
Croatia (3)	1	Dinamo Zagreb	**2023–24**
Croatia (3)	1	Rijeka	**2025–26**
Croatia (3)	1	Hajduk Split	2026–27
Slovakia (2)	4	Slovan Bratislava	2021–22, **2022–23**, **2023–24**, 2025–26
Slovakia (2)	1	Spartak Trnava	2023–24
Finland (2)	3	HJK	2021–22, 2023–24, 2024–25
Finland (2)	2	KuPS	2025–26, 2026–27
Scotland (2)	3	Heart of Midlothian	2022–23, 2024–25, 2026–27
Scotland (2)	2	Aberdeen	2023–24, 2025–26
Republic of Ireland (2)	3	Shamrock Rovers	2022–23, **2024–25**, 2025–26
Republic of Ireland (2)	1	Shelbourne	2025–26
Kazakhstan (2)	2	Astana	2023–24, 2024–25
Kazakhstan (2)	2	Kairat	2021–22, 2026–27
Bosnia and Herzegovina (2)	2	Zrinjski Mostar	2023–24, 2025–26
Bosnia and Herzegovina (2)	2	Borac Banja Luka	**2024–25**, 2026–27
Kosovo (2)	2	Ballkani	2022–23, 2023–24
Kosovo (2)	1	Drita	2025–26
Iceland (2)	2	Breiðablik	2023–24, 2025–26
Iceland (2)	1	Víkingur Reykjavík	2024–25
Bulgaria (2)	2	CSKA Sofia	2021–22, 2026–27
Bulgaria (2)	1	Ludogorets Razgrad	**2023–24**
Latvia (2)	1	RFS	2022–23
Latvia (2)	1	Riga	2026–27
Lithuania (2)	1	Žalgiris	2022–23
Lithuania (2)	1	Kauno Žalgiris	2026–27
Portugal (2)	1	Vitória de Guimarães	**2024–25**
Portugal (2)	1	Braga	2026–27
Gibraltar (1)	3	Lincoln Red Imps	2021–22, 2025–26, 2026–27
Azerbaijan (1)	1	Qarabağ	**2021–22**
Estonia (1)	1	Flora	2021–22
Liechtenstein (1)	1	Vaduz	2022–23
Faroe Islands (1)	1	KÍ	2023–24
Hungary (1)	1	Ferencváros	**2023–24**
Belarus (1)	1	Dinamo Minsk	2024–25
Moldova (1)	1	Petrocub Hîncești	2024–25
Northern Ireland (1)	1	Larne	2024–25
Wales (1)	1	The New Saints	2024–25
Malta (1)	1	Hamrun Spartans	2025–26
North Macedonia (1)	1	Shkëndija	2025–26
Albania (1)	1	Egnatia	2026–27
Andorra (1)	1	Inter Club d'Escaldes	2026–27
(Georgia (country)) Georgia (1)	1	Iberia 1999	2026–27

=== Most appearances ===
Players taking part in the 2026–27 UEFA Conference League are highlighted in bold.
Players still active but not in this year's Conference League are highlighted in italics.

==== Group/league phase to final ====
As of 5 November 2026

The table below does not include appearances made in the qualification phase of the competition.

Rank	Player	Nation	Apps	Years	Club(s) (Apps)
1	Rolando Mandragora	Italy	49	2022–2026	Fiorentina
2	Luca Ranieri	Italy	35	2022–2026	Fiorentina
3	Dodô	Brazil	34	2022–2026	Fiorentina
4	Christian Kouamé	Ivory Coast	30	2022–2025	Fiorentina
4	Sven Kums	Belgium	30	2021–2025	Gent
6	Cristiano Biraghi	Italy	28	2022–2024	Fiorentina
6	Jonathan Ikoné	France	28	2022–2024	Fiorentina
6	**Hong Hyun-seok**	South Korea	28	2021–	LASK (8), Gent (17), **Midtjylland** (3)
9	Pantelis Chatzidiakos	Greece	27	2021–2025	AZ (18), Copenhagen (9)
9	**Davy Roef**	Belgium	27	2021–	**Gent**

==== Including qualifying rounds ====
As of 5 November 2026

Rank	Player	Nation	Apps	Years	Club(s) (Apps)
1	Rolando Mandragora	Italy	56	2022–2026	Fiorentina
2	Sven Kums	Belgium	46	2021–2025	Gent
3	**Davy Roef**	Belgium	44	2021–	**Gent**
4	**Hong Hyun-seok**	South Korea	42	2021–	LASK (12), Gent (27), **Midtjylland** (3)
5	Dodô	Brazil	41	2022–2026	Fiorentina
5	Luca Ranieri	Italy	41	2022–2026	Fiorentina
7	Pantelis Chatzidiakos	Greece	39	2021–2026	AZ (28), Copenhagen (9), PAOK (2)
8	Tobias Gulliksen	Norway	38	2023–2026	Bodø/Glimt (11), Djurgårdens IF (18), Rapid Wien (9)
8	**Matisse Samoise**	Belgium	38	2021–	**Gent**
8	Ibrahim Traoré	Ivory Coast	38	2021–2024	Slavia Prague (22), Viktoria Plzeň (16)

=== All-time top scorers ===
Players taking part in the 2026–27 UEFA Conference League are highlighted in bold.
Players still active but not in this year's Conference League are highlighted in italics.

==== Group/league phase to final ====
As of 5 November 2026

The table below does not include goals scored in the qualification phase of the competition.

Rank	Player	Goals	Apps	Ratio	Years	Club(s) (Goals/Apps)
1	(Nigeria) **Cyriel Dessers**	13	16	0.81	2021–	Feyenoord (10/13), **Panathinaikos** (3/3)
1	(Sweden) Mikael Ishak	13	22	0.59	2022–2026	Lech Poznań
3	(Israel) Eran Zahavi	12	14	0.86	2022–2024	PSV Eindhoven (4/6), Maccabi Tel Aviv (8/8)
3	(Brazil) Arthur Cabral	12	20	0.6	2021–2023	Basel (5/6), Fiorentina (7/14)
3	(Greece) Vangelis Pavlidis	12	21	0.57	2021–2023	AZ
6	(Morocco) Ayoub El Kaabi	11	9	1.22	2024	Olympiacos
7	(Nigeria) Gift Orban	10	11	0.91	2023	Gent
8	(England) Tammy Abraham	9	13	0.69	2021–2022	Roma
8	(Senegal) Ismaïla Sarr	9	13	0.69	2025–2026	Crystal Palace
8	(Belgium) Hugo Cuypers	9	16	0.56	2022–2023	Gent
8	(Democratic Republic of the Congo) Afimico Pululu	9	19	0.47	2024–2026	Jagiellonia Białystok
8	(Serbia) Aleksandar Čavrić	9	20	0.45	2021–2023	Slovan Bratislava
8	(Serbia) Luka Jović	9	22	0.41	2022–2026	Fiorentina (6/13), AEK Athens (3/8)
8	(Italy) Rolando Mandragora	9	49	0.18	2022–2026	Fiorentina

==== Including qualifying rounds ====
As of 5 November 2026

Rank	Player	Goals	Apps	Ratio	Years	Club(s) (Goals/Apps)
1	(Brazil) Arthur Cabral	21	28	0.75	2021–2023	Basel (13/12), Fiorentina (8/16)
2	(Israel) Eran Zahavi	19	24	0.79	2022–2024	PSV Eindhoven (4/6), Maccabi Tel Aviv (15/18)
3	(Nigeria) **Cyriel Dessers**	16	19	0.84	2021–	Feyenoord (10/13), **Panathinaikos** (6/6)
3	(Belgium) Hugo Cuypers	16	22	0.73	2022–2023	Gent
3	(Sweden) Mikael Ishak	16	30	0.53	2022–2026	Lech Poznań
3	(Greece) Vangelis Pavlidis	16	31	0.52	2021–2023	AZ
7	(Nigeria) Gift Orban	14	16	0.88	2023	Gent
7	(Cape Verde) Ricardo Gomes	14	24	0.58	2021–2023	Partizan
9	(England) Tammy Abraham	13	18	0.72	2021–2025	Roma (9/14), Beşiktaş (4/4)
9	(Democratic Republic of the Congo) Afimico Pululu	13	26	0.5	2021–2026	Basel (0/2), Jagiellonia Białystok (13/24)
9	(Kosovo) Albion Rrahmani	13	27	0.48	2022–2026	Ballkani (9/14), Sparta Prague (4/13)
9	(Norway) Amahl Pellegrino	13	27	0.48	2021–2023	Bodø/Glimt
9	(Kosovo) Meriton Korenica	13	29	0.45	2022–2026	Ballkani (8/18), CFR Cluj (5/11)

=== Other records ===
- The 2024–25 edition victory made Chelsea the first club to win all four major European trophies, including all three of the current European competitions. They received a special UEFA award for this achievement in 2025.
- The largest single-match margin of victory in the current Conference League format is 8–0, with Chelsea's victory over FC Noah in the 2024–25 edition's league stage.
- Only one club has won the competition unbeaten: West Ham, who won 12 games and drew one in the 2022–23 edition.
- West Ham and Chelsea share the record for the most wins in one singular Conference League campaign, with 12 wins each in 2022–23 and 2024–25 respectively.
- Chelsea scored a record of 42 goals in 13 matches in their 2024–25 winning campaign.

== Awards ==
=== Player of the Season ===
Starting from the first edition of the competition, UEFA introduced the UEFA Conference League Player of the Season award. It was known as the UEFA Europa Conference League Player of the Season award before the renaming of the competition in 2024.

The jury is composed of the coaches of the clubs which participate in the league phase (group stage prior to 2024–25 season) of the competition, together with 55 journalists selected by the European Sports Media (ESM) group, one from each UEFA member association.

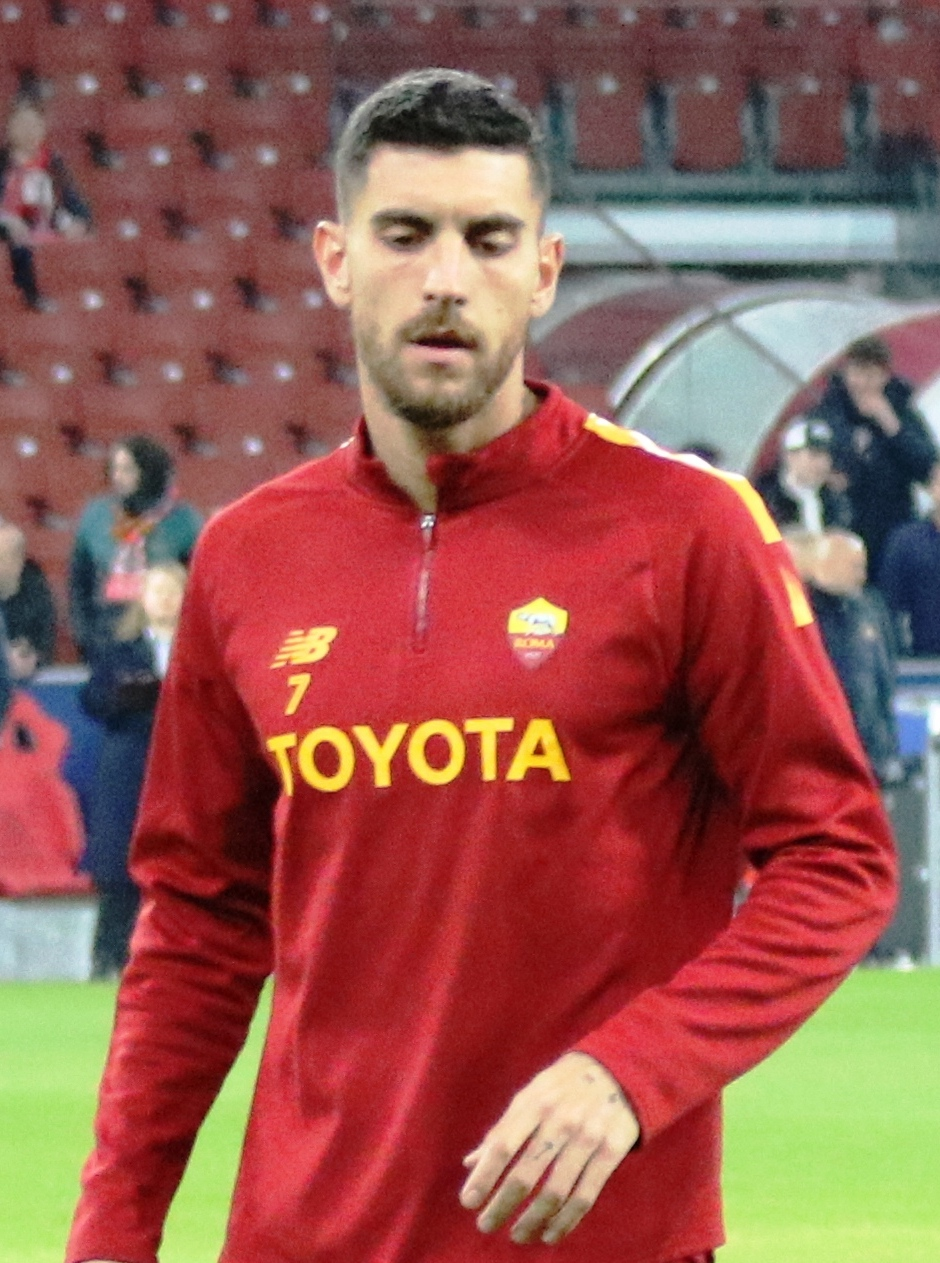
Pellegrini, the first winner of the Player of the Season award in 2022

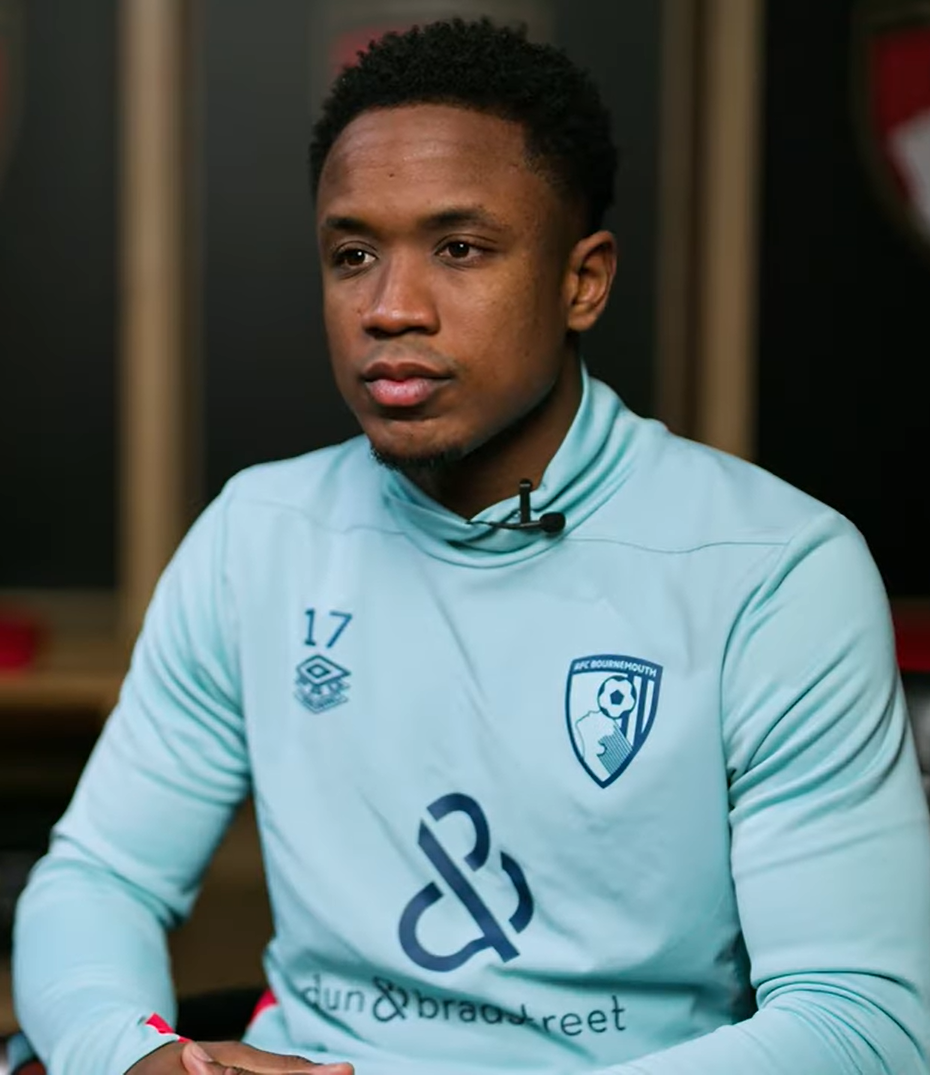
Sinisterra, the first winner of the Young Player of the Season award in 2022

Season	Player	Club
UEFA Conference League Player of the Season
2021–22	(Italy) Lorenzo Pellegrini	(Italy) Roma
2022–23	(England) Declan Rice	(England) West Ham United
2023–24	(Morocco) Ayoub El Kaabi	(Greece) Olympiacos
2024–25	(Spain) Isco	(Spain) Real Betis
2025–26	(Senegal) Ismaïla Sarr	(England) Crystal Palace

=== Young Player of the Season ===
UEFA also introduced the UEFA Conference League Young Player of the Season award. It was known as the UEFA Europa Conference League Young Player of the Season award before the renaming of the competition in 2024.

Season	Player	Club
UEFA Conference League Young Player of the Season
2021–22	(Colombia) Luis Sinisterra	(Netherlands) Feyenoord
2022–23	(France) Andy Diouf	(Switzerland) Basel
2023–24	(Brazil) Igor Thiago	(Belgium) Club Brugge
2024–25	(Norway) Tobias Gulliksen	(Sweden) Djurgårdens IF
2025–26	(Netherlands) Kees Smit	(Netherlands) AZ

== Sponsorship ==
The UEFA Conference League is sponsored by international corporations, sharing the same partners as the UEFA Europa League. Among the main sponsors of the tournament for the 2024–2027 cycle are:

- Just Eat Takeaway
- Laufenn
- Engelbert Strauss
- Swissquote
- Betano
- Lidl

Decathlon sub-brand, Kipsta, is the official match ball supplier from the 2024–25 season onwards for a three-year period.

== See also ==
- UEFA club competition records
- UEFA Intertoto Cup
- UEFA Cup Winners' Cup
