= 2021–22 Cercle Brugge KSV season =

Cercle Brugge
2021–22 season
- Owner: Dmitry Rybolovlev
- Manager: Yves Vanderhaeghe (until 28 November); Dominik Thalhammer (from 28 November)
- Stadium: Jan Breydel Stadium
- First Division A: 10th
- Belgian Cup: Seventh round
- Top goalscorer: League: Rabbi Matondo (9); All: Rabbi Matondo (9)
Home colours	Away colours	Third colours

The 2021–22 season was the 123rd season in the existence of Cercle Brugge K.S.V. and the club's 27th consecutive season in the top flight of Belgian football. In addition to the domestic league, Cercle Brugge K.S.V. will participate in this season's edition of the Belgian Cup.

== Players ==
=== First-team squad ===
Note: Flags indicate national team as defined under FIFA eligibility rules; some limited exceptions apply. Players may hold more than one non-FIFA nationality.

No.	Pos.	Nation	Player
1	GK	FRA	Thomas Didillon
2	DF	BRA	Vitinho
3	DF	BRA	David Sousa (on loan from Botafogo)
4	DF	NOR	Jesper Daland
5	DF	SRB	Boris Popovic
6	MF	LTU	Edgaras Utkus
8	DF	BEL	Robbe Decostere
9	FW	TOG	Kévin Denkey
10	FW	BIH	Dino Hotić
11	FW	WAL	Rabbi Matondo (on loan from Schalke)
14	MF	BEL	Charles Vanhoutte
16	GK	BEL	Miguel Van Damme
17	DF	FRA	Serge-Philippe Raux-Yao

No.	Pos.	Nation	Player
18	DF	BEL	Senna Miangué (on loan from Cagliari)
19	DF	BUL	Dimitar Velkovski
21	GK	BRA	Warleson
22	MF	POR	Leonardo Lopes
23	MF	BEL	Olivier Deman
25	DF	BEL	Alexander Corryn
28	MF	BEL	Hannes Van der Bruggen
34	FW	BEL	Thibo Somers
35	FW	CGO	Silvère Ganvoula (on loan from Bochum)
42	FW	BEL	Aske Sampers
44	MF	BEL	Andi Koshi
89	GK	BEL	Sébastien Bruzzese
98	MF	SEN	Franck Kanouté

=== Other players under contract ===
Note: Flags indicate national team as defined under FIFA eligibility rules; some limited exceptions apply. Players may hold more than one non-FIFA nationality.

No.	Pos.	Nation	Player
—	FW	BEL	Kylian Hazard

=== On loan ===
Note: Flags indicate national team as defined under FIFA eligibility rules; some limited exceptions apply. Players may hold more than one non-FIFA nationality.

No.	Pos.	Nation	Player
32	DF	BEL	Arne Cassaert (on loan to Knokke)
—	FW	FRA	Alimami Gory (on loan to Paris)

No.	Pos.	Nation	Player
—	MF	MLI	Aldom Deuro (on loan to Châteauroux)

== Pre-season and friendlies ==
Win Draw Loss Fixtures

26 June 2021 Friendly	Dunkerque (France)	1–1	(Belgium) Cercle Brugge	Dunkirk, France
18:00 CEST (UTC+2)				Stadium: Stade Marcel-Tribut

2 July 2021 Friendly	Zulte Waregem (Belgium)	1–2	(Belgium) Cercle Brugge	Waregem, Belgium
18:00 CEST (UTC+2)				Stadium: Regenboogstadion

3 July 2021 Friendly	Standard Liège (Belgium)	3–2	(Belgium) Cercle Brugge	Liège, Belgium
16:30 CEST (UTC+2)				Stadium: Stade Maurice Dufrasne

10 July 2021 Friendly	Monaco (France)	3–1	(Belgium) Cercle Brugge	La Turbie, France
09:30 CEST (UTC+2)	Diop 16'; Matsima 42'; Pellegri 70'		Velkovski 3'	Stadium: CMB Training Centre

17 July 2021 Friendly	Strasbourg (France)	Cancelled	(Belgium) Cercle Brugge	Évian-les-Bains, France
18:00 CEST (UTC+2)				Stadium: Stade Camille Fournier

2 September 2021 Friendly	Utrecht (Netherlands)	3–1	(Belgium) Cercle Brugge	Utrecht, Netherlands
14:00 CEST (UTC+2)	Van den Berg (yellow card); Van der Hoorn 42'; Benamar 63'; Mallahi 69'		Somers 81'	Stadium: Stadion Galgenwaard; Attendance: 501

== Competitions ==
=== Overall record ===
Competition	First match	Last match	Starting round	Final position	Record							
Competition	First match	Last match	Starting round	Final position	Pld	W	D	L	GF	GA	GD	Win %
First Division A	27 July 2021	9 April 2022	Matchday 1	10th	34	12	9	13	49	46	+3	35.29
Belgian Cup	28 October 2021	1 December 2021	Sixth round	Seventh round	2	1	0	1	4	2	+2	50.00
Total					36	13	9	14	53	48	+5	36.11

Source: Soccerway

=== First Division A ===
==== League table ====
Pos	Team	Pld	W	D	L	GF	GA	GD	Pts	Qualification or relegation
8	Genk	34	15	6	13	66	47	+19	51	Qualification for the Play-offs II
9	Sint-Truiden	34	15	6	13	42	40	+2	51	
10	Cercle Brugge	34	12	9	13	49	46	+3	45	
11	OH Leuven	34	10	11	13	47	58	−11	41	
12	Oostende	34	10	7	17	34	61	−27	37	

Source: Jupiler Pro League (in Dutch), Soccerway
Rules for classification: 1) Points; 2) Matches won; 3) Goal difference; 4) Goals scored; 5) Away matches won; 6) Away goal difference; 7) Away goals scored; 8) Play-off.

==== Results summary ====
Overall								Home						Away					
Pld	W	D	L	GF	GA	GD	Pts	W	D	L	GF	GA	GD	W	D	L	GF	GA	GD
34	12	9	13	49	46	+3	45	6	4	7	23	20	+3	6	5	6	26	26	0

Source: Jupiler Pro League

==== Results by round ====
Round	1	2	3	4	5	6	7	8	9	10	11	12	13	14	15	16	17	18	19	20	21	22	23	24	25	26	27	28	29	30	31	32	33	34
Ground	A	H	A	H	A	H	A	H	A	H	A	H	H	A	H	H	A	A	H	A	H	A	H	A	H	A	A	H	A	H	H	A	H	A
Result	W	D	D	L	L	L	W	L	L	L	L	D	L	D	L	W	W	W	W	L	W	W	W	W	L	D	L	W	D	D	W	L	D	D
Position	6	5	7	10	12	16	13	14	16	17	17	17	17	17	17	17	17	16	12	14	11	10	10	7	8	9	10	9	9	9	9	10	10	10

Source: Jupiler Pro League
A = Away; H = Home; W = Win; D = Draw; L = Loss

==== Matches ====
The league fixtures were announced on 8 June 2021.

27 July 2021 1	Beerschot	0–1	Cercle Brugge	Antwerp
18:30 CEST (UTC+2)		Report	Deman 40'	Stadium: Olympisch Stadion; Referee: Alexandre Boucaut

31 July 2021 2	Cercle Brugge	1–1	OH Leuven	Brugge
18:30 CEST (UTC+2)	Rubio 73'	Report	Henry 30'	Stadium: Jan Breydel Stadium; Attendance: 2,500; Referee: Lothar D'hondt

6 August 2021 3	Club Brugge	1–1	Cercle Brugge	Brugge
20:45 CEST (UTC+2)	Vormer 35'	Report	Waldo 90+1'	Stadium: Jan Breydel Stadium; Attendance: 10,000; Referee: Kevin Van Damme

15 August 2021 4	Cercle Brugge	1–2	Anderlecht	Bruges
18:30 CEST (UTC+2)	Deman 1'	Report	Zirkzee 13', 29'	Stadium: Jan Breydel Stadium; Attendance: 3,000; Referee: Jasper Vergoote

21 August 2021 5	RFC Seraing	2–1	Cercle Brugge	Seraing
16:15 CEST (UTC+2)	Maziz 54'; Mouandilmadji 79'	Report	Popović 5'	Stadium: Stade du Pairay; Attendance: 1,200; Referee: Christof Dierick

28 August 2021 6	Cercle Brugge	0–1	Sint-Truiden	Bruges
18:30 CEST (UTC+2)		Report	Hayashi 7'	Stadium: Jan Breydel Stadium; Attendance: 2,200; Referee: Jan Boterberg

11 September 2021 7	Zulte Waregem	2–4	Cercle Brugge	Waregem
18:30 CEST (UTC+2)		Report		Stadium: Regenboogstadion; Attendance: 6,200; Referee: Alexandre Boucaut

17 September 2021 8	Cercle Brugge	1–2	Eupen	Bruges
20:45 CEST (UTC+2)		Report		Stadium: Jan Breydel Stadium; Attendance: 3,551; Referee: Bert Put

26 September 2021 9	Gent	2–1	Cercle Brugge	Ghent
16:00 CEST (UTC+2)		Report		Stadium: Ghelamco Arena

2 October 2021 10	Cercle Brugge	0–3	Union Saint-Gilloise	Brugge
18:30 CEST (UTC+2)	Leonardo Lopes (yellow card) 22'; Waldo Rubio Martín (yellow card) 81'	Report	Teddy Teuma (yellow card) 24'; Dante Vanzeir 60', 79'; Siebe Van der Heyden (yellow card) 70'; Loïc Lapoussin 84'	Stadium: Jan Breydelstadion; Attendance: 2,850; Referee: Wesli De Cremer

16 October 2021 11	Oostende	2–1	Cercle Brugge	Ostend
18:30 CEST (UTC+2)		Report		Stadium: Versluys Arena; Attendance: 4,132; Referee: Wim Smet

23 October 2021 12	Cercle Brugge	1–1	Standard Liège	Bruges
16:15 CEST (UTC+2)	Daland 16'	Report	Bastien 4'	Stadium: Jan Breydel Stadium; Attendance: 3,552; Referee: Jan Boterberg

31 October 2021 13	Cercle Brugge	0–1	Antwerp	Bruges
16:00 CET (UTC+1)	Hotić (yellow card) 45+2'; Sousa (yellow card) 52'; Daland (yellow card) 70'; Vanhoutte (yellow card) 90+2'	Report	Vines (yellow card) 39'; Frey 57' (pen.); Yusuf (yellow card) 60'; B. Verstraete (yellow card) 63'; Samatta (yellow card) 70'; De Laet (yellow card) 90'	Stadium: Jan Breydel Stadium; Attendance: 3,273; Referee: Lothar D'hondt

7 November 2021 14	Genk	1–1	Cercle Brugge	Genk
--:-- CET (UTC+1)				Stadium: Jan Breydel Stadium

20 November 2021 15	Cercle Brugge	1–2	Charleroi	Brugge
--:-- CET (UTC+1)				Stadium: Jan Breydel Stadium

27 November 2021 16	Cercle Brugge	3–1	Mechelen	Brugge
18:30 CET (UTC+1)				Stadium: Jan Breydel Stadium

4 December 2021 17	Kortrijk	0–2	Cercle Brugge	Kortrijk
18:30 CET (UTC+1)				Stadium: Guldensporen Stadion

11 December 2021 18	Sint-Truiden	1–2	Cercle Brugge	Sint-Truiden
18:30 CET (UTC+1)	Brüls 58' (pen.)	Report	Utkus 50'; Matondo 75', (yellow card) 73' (yellow-red card) 90+4'	Stadium: Stayen; Attendance: 3,004; Referee: Kevin Van Damme

14 December 2021 19	Cercle Brugge	2–0	RFC Seraing	Bruges
18:45 CET (UTC+1)		Report		Stadium: Jan Breydel Stadium; Attendance: 2,368; Referee: Brent Staessens

18 December 2021 20	Union Saint-Gilloise	3–2	Cercle Brugge	Brussels
18:30 CET (UTC+1)	Kandouss (yellow card) 27'; Teuma (yellow card) 45'; Nielsen (yellow card) 49'; Van der Heyden (yellow card) 56'; Mitoma 57'; Nieuwkoop 75'; Daland 90' (o.g.)	Report	Utkus 8'; Matondo 24'; Daland (yellow card) 29'; Somers (yellow card) 68'; Lopes (yellow card) 77'	Stadium: Stade Joseph Marien; Attendance: 7,114; Referee: Jan Boterberg

26 December 2021 21	Cercle Brugge	2–0	Club Brugge	Bruges
13:30 CET (UTC+1)	Miangue 53'; Albino 90'	Report	Lang (yellow card) 26' (yellow-red card) 90+4'	Stadium: Jan Breydel Stadium; Attendance: 0 Referee: Nicolas Laforge

16 January 2022 22	Eupen	0–2	Cercle Brugge	Eupen
16:00 CET (UTC+1)		Report		Stadium: Kehrwegstadion; Referee: Christof Dierick

23 January 2022 23	Cercle Brugge	3–1	Zulte Waregem	Bruges
21:00 CET (UTC+1)		Report		Stadium: Jan Breydel Stadium; Referee: Alexandre Boucaut

26 January 2022 24	Anderlecht	0–2	Cercle Brugge	Anderlecht
21:00 CET (UTC+1)		Report	Matondo 68'; Kanouté 87'	Stadium: Constant Vanden Stock Stadium; Referee: Wesli De Cremer

29 January 2022 25	Cercle Brugge	0–1	Oostende	Bruges
20:45 CET (UTC+1)		Report	D'Arpino 76'	Stadium: Jan Breydel Stadium; Attendance: 3,200; Referee: Arthur Denil

5 February 2022 26	Standard Liège	1–1	Cercle Brugge	Liège
18:30 CET (UTC+1)	Raskin 55'	Report	Hotić 44'	Stadium: Stade Maurice Dufrasne; Referee: Lawrence Visser

12 February 2022 27	OH Leuven	3–2	Cercle Brugge	Leuven
18:30 CET (UTC+1)	Maertens 40'; Kaba 63'; Al-Taamari 67'	Report	Matondo 32'; Denkey 43'	Stadium: Den Dreef; Attendance: 3,898; Referee: Alexandre Boucaut

19 February 2022 28	Cercle Brugge	2–0	Beerschot	Bruges
16:15 CET (UTC+1)	Denkey 27'; Matondo 45+1'	Report		Stadium: Jan Breydel Stadium; Attendance: 3,872; Referee: Bert Put

26 February 2022 29	Mechelen	2–2	Cercle Brugge	Mechelen
18:30 CET (UTC+1)		Report		Stadium: AFAS Stadion; Attendance: 9,889; Referee: Bram Van Driessche

5 March 2022 30	Cercle Brugge	2–2	Genk	Bruges
16:15 CET (UTC+1)		Report		Stadium: Jan Breydel Stadium; Attendance: 4,205; Referee: Erik Lambrechts

12 March 2022 31	Cercle Brugge	2–0	Kortrijk	Bruges
18:30 CET (UTC+1)		Report		Stadium: Jan Breydel Stadium; Attendance: 4,000; Referee: Nathan Verboomen

19 March 2022 32	Charleroi	5–0	Cercle Brugge	Charleroi
18:30 CET (UTC+1)		Report		Stadium: Stade du Pays de Charleroi; Attendance: 5,636; Referee: Bram Van Driessche

3 April 2022 33	Cercle Brugge	2–2	Gent	Bruges
16:00 CEST (UTC+2)	Somers 4', 81'	Report	Tissoudali 3'; Depoitre (yellow card) 22', (goal) 30'; Hjulsager (red card) 86'	Stadium: Jan Breydel Stadium; Attendance: 6,572; Referee: Nicolas Laforge

9 April 2022 34	Antwerp	1–1	Cercle Brugge	Antwerp
20:45 CEST (UTC+2)	Balikwisha 48'	Report	Vitinho (yellow card) 40'; Denkey 76'	Stadium: Bosuilstadion; Attendance: 12,336; Referee: Kevin Van Damme

=== Belgian Cup ===
28 October 2021 Sixth round	Cercle Brugge	3–0	Tienen	Brugge
20:00 CEST	Denkey 33'; Matondo 42'; Cassaert 63'			Stadium: Jan Breydelstadion

1 December 2021 Seventh round	Mechelen	2–1 (a.e.t.)	Cercle Brugge	Mechelen
20:30 CET	De Camargo 67'; Storm 117'		Somers 30'	Stadium: AFAS-stadion Achter de Kazerne
