= 2022–23 Cercle Brugge KSV season =

Cercle Brugge
2022–23 season
- Owner: Dmitry Rybolovlev
- Manager: Dominik Thalhammer (until 19 September 2022); Miron Muslic (from 19 September 2022)
- Stadium: Jan Breydel Stadium
- Pro League: 6th
- Belgian Cup: Seventh round
- Top goalscorer: League: Ayase Ueda (22); All: Ayase Ueda (23)
Home colours	Away colours	Third colours

The 2022–23 season was the 123rd season in the existence of Cercle Brugge K.S.V. and the club's 28th consecutive season in the top flight of Belgian football. In addition to the domestic league, Cercle Brugge also participated in this season's edition of the Belgian Cup.

== Players ==
=== First-team squad ===
As of 5 May 2023

Note: Flags indicate national team as defined under FIFA eligibility rules; some limited exceptions apply. Players may hold more than one non-FIFA nationality.

No.	Pos.	Nation	Player
1	GK	POL	Radosław Majecki (on loan from Monaco)
3	DF	BRA	David Sousa (on loan from Botafogo)
4	DF	NOR	Jesper Daland
5	DF	SRB	Boris Popovic
6	MF	LTU	Edgaras Utkus
7	FW	GER	Emilio Kehrer
8	DF	BEL	Robbe Decostere
9	FW	TOG	Kévin Denkey
10	MF	BIH	Dino Hotić
11	FW	FRA	Yann Gboho
14	MF	BEL	Charles Vanhoutte
17	MF	GHA	Abu Francis
18	DF	BEL	Senna Miangué

No.	Pos.	Nation	Player
21	GK	BRA	Warleson
22	MF	POR	Leonardo Lopes
23	FW	BEL	Olivier Deman
24	DF	FRA	Jean Marcelin (on loan from Monaco)
28	MF	BEL	Hannes Van der Bruggen
34	FW	BEL	Thibo Somers
36	FW	JPN	Ayase Ueda
38	FW	MEX	Teun Wilke (on loan from S.P.A.L.)
41	DF	BEL	Hugo Siquet (on loan from SC Freiburg)
47	DF	JAM	Tarick Ximines
66	MF	BEL	Christiaan Ravych
89	GK	BEL	Sébastien Bruzzese
—	MF	MEX	Dagoberto Espinoza (on loan from Club América)

=== Other players under contract ===
Note: Flags indicate national team as defined under FIFA eligibility rules; some limited exceptions apply. Players may hold more than one non-FIFA nationality.

No.	Pos.	Nation	Player
—	MF	MLI	Aldom Deuro

=== Out on loan ===
Note: Flags indicate national team as defined under FIFA eligibility rules; some limited exceptions apply. Players may hold more than one non-FIFA nationality.

No.	Pos.	Nation	Player
29	DF	FRA	Louis Torres (on loan to Rodez until 30 June 2023)
—	GK	FRA	Thomas Didillon (on loan to Monaco until 30 June 2023)

No.	Pos.	Nation	Player
—	DF	BEL	Arne Cassaert (on loan to Virton until 30 June 2023)
—	MF	SEN	Franck Kanouté (on loan to Sochaux until 30 June 2023)

== Transfers ==
=== In ===
Pos	Player	Transferred from	Fee	Date	Source
FW	Emilio Kehrer (GER)	SC Freiburg (GER)	Free	7 June 2022	
FW	Ayase Ueda (JPN)	Kashima Antlers (JPN)	Undisclosed	4 July 2022	
DF	Lucas Larade (FRA)	Monaco (FRA)	Undisclosed	19 July 2022	
DF	Louis Torres (FRA)	Monaco (FRA)	Undisclosed	19 July 2022	
GK	Radosław Majecki (POL)	Monaco (FRA)	Loan	20 July 2022	
DF	Heitor (BRA)	Internacional (BRA)	Loan	23 July 2022	
MF	Yann Gboho (FRA)	Rennes (FRA)	Undisclosed	19 August 2022	
MF	Abu Francis (GHA)	Nordsjælland (DEN)	Undisclosed	19 August 2022	
MF	Teun Wilke (MEX)	S.P.A.L. (ITA)	Loan	22 August 2022	
DF	Jean Marcelin (FRA)	Monaco (FRA)	Loan	23 August 2022	
MF	Dagoberto Espinoza (MEX)	Club América (MEX)	Loan	26 August 2022	
DF	Tarick Ximines (JAM)	Unattached	Free	4 January 2023	
DF	Hugo Siquet	SC Freiburg (GER)	Loan	14 January 2023	

=== Out ===
Pos	Player	Transferred to	Fee	Date	Source
MF	Rabbi Matondo (WAL)	Schalke 04 (GER)	End of loan	2 June 2022	
MF	Andi Koshi	Beerschot	Free	5 July 2022	
DF	Alexander Corryn	Beveren	Free	10 July 2022	
MF	Franck Kanouté (SEN)	Sochaux (FRA)	Loan	14 July 2022	
DF	Arne Cassaert	Virton	Loan	15 July 2022	
GK	Thomas Didillon (FRA)	Monaco (FRA)	Loan	20 July 2022	
DF	Vitinho (BRA)	Burnley (ENG)	Undisclosed	28 July 2022	
DF	Heitor (BRA)	Internacional (BRA)	End of loan	5 January 2023	
FW	Aske Sampers	Lierse Kempenzonen	Undisclosed	31 January 2023	
DF	Louis Torres (FRA)	Rodez (FRA)	Loan	31 January 2023	
DF	Dimitar Velkovski (BUL)	Miedź Legnica (POL)	Undisclosed	14 February 2023	
DF	Lucas Larade (FRA)	Jerv (NOR)	Undisclosed	5 March 2023	

== Pre-season and friendlies ==
25 June 2022 Friendly	Monaco (France)	1–0	(Belgium) Cercle Brugge	La Turbie, France
10:00	Musaba 18'	Report		Stadium: CMB Training Centre

2 July 2022 Friendly	PSV (Netherlands)	2–2	(Belgium) Cercle Brugge	Eindhoven, Netherlands
15:00	Madueke 22'; Tielemans 55'	Report	Denkey 67', 89'	Stadium: De Herdgang; Referee: Erwin Blank (Netherlands)

9 July 2022 Friendly	Nice (France)	1–1	(Belgium) Cercle Brugge	Nice, France
10:00	Delort 8'	Report	Nahounou 83' (o.g.)

16 July 2022 Friendly	Dender (Belgium)	0–5	(Belgium) Cercle Brugge	Denderleeuw, Belgium
16:00		Report	Van der Bruggen 1'; Ueda 23'; Hotić 51'; Martlé 94'; Denkey 111'	Stadium: Van Roystadion
Note: The match was played over 120 minutes

22 September 2022 Friendly	Heerenveen (Netherlands)	1–0	(Belgium) Cercle Brugge	Roosendaal, Netherlands
	Al Hajj (?)	Report

10 December 2022 Friendly	Kortrijk (Belgium)	2–3	(Belgium) Cercle Brugge	Mouscron, Belgium
	Kadri 37'; Mbayo 92'	Report	Hotić 29' (pen.); Decostere 90'; Ueda 118'	Stadium: Stade Le Canonnier; Attendance: 0 (behind closed doors)
Note: The match was played over 120 minutes

13 February 2023 Friendly	Cercle Brugge (Belgium)	4–0	(Belgium) Deinze	Bruges, Belgium
	Hotić 28'; Kehrer 57'; Gboho 69'; Denkey 82'	Report		Stadium: Jan Breydel Stadium

6 March 2023 Friendly	Cercle Brugge (Belgium)	1–1	(Belgium) RWDM	Bruges, Belgium
	Lopes 59'	Report	Botella 68'	Stadium: Jan Breydel Stadium

== Competitions ==
=== Overall record ===
Competition	First match	Last match	Starting round	Final position	Record							
Competition	First match	Last match	Starting round	Final position	Pld	W	D	L	GF	GA	GD	Win %
Pro League	24 July 2022	23 April 2023	Matchday 1	8th	34	13	11	10	50	46	+4	38.24
Pro League Play-off II	29 April 2023	3 June 2023	4th	2nd	6	3	2	1	13	9	+4	50.00
Belgian Cup	9 November 2022	20 December 2022	Sixth round	Seventh round	2	1	0	1	3	3	+0	50.00
Total					42	17	13	12	66	58	+8	40.48

Last updated: 5 June 2023
Source: Soccerway

=== Pro League ===
==== League table ====
Pos	Team	Pld	W	D	L	GF	GA	GD	Pts	Qualification or relegation
6	Standard Liège	34	16	7	11	58	45	+13	55	Qualification for the Play-offs II
7	Westerlo	34	14	9	11	61	53	+8	51	Qualification for the Play-offs II
8	Cercle Brugge	34	13	11	10	50	46	+4	50	Qualification for the Play-offs II
9	Charleroi	34	14	6	14	45	52	−7	48	
10	OH Leuven	34	13	9	12	56	48	+8	48	

Source: Jupiler Pro League (in Dutch), Soccerway
Rules for classification: 1) Points; 2) Matches won; 3) Goal difference; 4) Goals scored; 5) Away matches won; 6) Away goal difference; 7) Away goals scored; 8) Play-off.

==== Results summary ====
Overall								Home						Away					
Pld	W	D	L	GF	GA	GD	Pts	W	D	L	GF	GA	GD	W	D	L	GF	GA	GD
34	13	11	10	50	46	+4	50	8	7	2	31	18	+13	5	4	8	19	28	−9

Source: Jupiler Pro League

==== Results by round ====
Round	1	2	3	4	5	6	7	8	9	10	11	12	13	14	15	16	17	18	19	20	21	22	23	24	25	26	27	28	29	30	31	32	33	34
Ground	A	H	A	H	A	H	A	H	H	A	A	H	A	H	A	H	A	A	H	A	H	A	H	H	A	H	A	H	A	H	H	A	H	A
Result	L	W	L	D	L	D	L	L	D	W	L	W	W	W	D	W	W	D	L	L	D	W	W	D	D	D	D	W	L	D	W	L	W	W
Position																																		8

Source: Jupiler Pro League
A = Away; H = Home; W = Win; D = Draw; L = Loss

==== Matches ====
The league fixture was announced on 22 June 2022.

24 July 2022 1	Westerlo	2–0	Cercle Brugge	Westerlo
21:00 CEST	Daci 40'; Vetokele 90+5'	Report		Stadium: Het Kuipje; Referee: Wesli De Cremer

30 July 2022 2	Cercle Brugge	1–0	Anderlecht	Bruges
16:00 CEST	Torres 75'	Report		Stadium: Jan Breydel Stadium; Referee: Jan Boterberg

7 August 2022 3	Standard Liège	2–0	Cercle Brugge	Liège
13:30 CEST	Amallah 31' (pen.), 45+5' (pen.)	Report		Stadium: Stade Maurice Dufrasne; Referee: Erik Lambrechts

13 August 2022 4	Cercle Brugge	0–0	Mechelen	Bruges
18:15 CEST		Report		Stadium: Jan Breydel Stadium; Referee: Wesli De Cremer

20 August 2022 5	Genk	2–1	Cercle Brugge	Genk
18:15 CEST	Heynen 41', 57' (pen.)	Report	Deman 46'	Stadium: Cegeka Arena; Referee: Kevin Van Damme

27 August 2022 6	Cercle Brugge	1–1	Zulte Waregem	Bruges
18:15 CEST	Ueda 11'	Report	Rommens 16'	Stadium: Jan Breydel Stadium; Referee: Bram Van Driessche

2 September 2022 7	Club Brugge	4–0	Cercle Brugge	Bruges
20:45 CEST	Skov Olsen 43'; Marcelin 59' (o.g.); Nielsen 67'; Yaremchuk 82'	Report		Stadium: Jan Breydel Stadium; Referee: Lawrence Visser

11 September 2022 8	Cercle Brugge	0–2	Antwerp	Bruges
16:00 CEST		Report	Janssen 6'; Alderweireld 68'	Stadium: Jan Breydel Stadium; Referee: Lothar D'hondt

17 September 2022 9	Cercle Brugge	2–2	Oostende	Bruges
18:15 CEST	Denkey 38'; Ueda 44'	Report	Ambrose 76', 82' (pen.)	Stadium: Jan Breydel Stadium

2 October 2022 10	Gent	3–4	Cercle Brugge	Ghent
16:00 CEST	Cuypers 49', 68'; Depoitre 77'	Report	Denkey 24'; Hotić 59', 75', 89' (pen.)	Stadium: Ghelamco Arena; Referee: Wim Smet

9 October 2022 11	Union SG	2–1	Cercle Brugge	Brussels
21:00 CEST	Vanzeir 2'; Adingra 56'	Report	Gboho 74'	Stadium: Joseph Marien Stadium; Referee: Jasper Vergoote

15 October 2022 12	Cercle Brugge	5–1	Eupen	Bruges
18:15 CEST	Denkey 25', 77', 86'; Somers 30'; Ueda 39'	Report	Peeters 44' (pen.)	Stadium: Jan Breydel Stadium; Referee: Erik Lambrechts

18 October 2022 13	Seraing	0–1	Cercle Brugge	Seraing
20:45 CEST		Report	Popović 25'	Stadium: Stade du Pairay; Referee: Nathan Verboomen

21 October 2022 14	Cercle Brugge	4–1	Charleroi	Bruges
20:45 CEST	Ueda 32', 57'; Gboho 73'; Kehrer 90'	Report	Heymans 67' (pen.)	Stadium: Jan Breydel Stadium; Referee: Lawrence Visser

29 October 2022 15	Kortrijk	1–1	Cercle Brugge	Kortrijk
18:15 CEST	Messaoudi 79'	Report	Popović 9'	Stadium: Guldensporen Stadion; Referee: Lothar D'hondt

5 November 2022 16	Cercle Brugge	2–1	OH Leuven	Bruges
18:15 CEST	Ueda 36'; Ravych 90+1'	Report	González 41'	Stadium: Jan Breydel Stadium; Referee: Arthur Denil

12 November 2022 17	Sint-Truiden	0–1	Cercle Brugge	Sint-Truiden
18:15 CEST		Report	Ueda 69'	Stadium: Stayen; Referee: Erik Lambrechts

23 December 2022 18	Mechelen	1–1	Cercle Brugge	Mechelen
20:30 CEST	Storm 71'	Report	Denkey 3'	Stadium: Achter de Kazerne; Referee: Brent Staessens

7 January 2023 19	Cercle Brugge	0–1	Westerlo	Bruges
18:15 CEST		Report	Chadli 6' (pen.)	Stadium: Jan Breydel Stadium; Referee: Wesli De Cremer

15 January 2023 20	Charleroi	2–1	Cercle Brugge	Charleroi
21:00 CEST	Mbenza 44'; Hosseinzadeh 51'	Report	Vanhoutte 27'	Stadium: Stade du Pays de Charleroi; Referee: Arthur Denil

18 January 2023 21	Cercle Brugge	1–1	Union SG	Bruges
18:30 CEST	Somers 68'	Report	Nilsson 82'	Stadium: Jan Breydel Stadium; Referee: Jasper Vergoote

21 January 2023 22	Oostende	1–2	Cercle Brugge	Ostend
18:15 CEST	Ambrose 66' (pen.)	Report	Ueda 24'; Hotić 90+1'	Stadium: Diaz Arena; Referee: Lawrence Visser

29 January 2023 23	Cercle Brugge	3–2	Gent	Bruges
16:00 CEST	Ueda 58'; Denkey 59'; Daland 90+4'	Report	De Sart 66'; Lemajić 90'	Stadium: Jan Breydel Stadium; Referee: Nicolas Laforge

4 February 2023 24	Cercle Brugge	1–1	Standard Liège	Bruges
16:00 CEST	Ueda 90+1'	Report	Zinckernagel 81' (pen.)	Stadium: Jan Breydel Stadium; Referee: Bert Put

10 February 2023 25	OH Leuven	0–0	Cercle Brugge	Leuven
20:00 CEST		Report		Stadium: Den Dreef; Referee: Alexandre Boucaut

19 February 2023 26	Cercle Brugge	2–2	Club Brugge	Bruges
13:30 CEST	Denkey 51'; Somers 78'	Report	Lang 18'; Nielsen 71'	Stadium: Jan Breydel Stadium; Referee: Jonathan Lardot

25 February 2023 27	Eupen	2–2	Cercle Brugge	Eupen
18:15 CEST	Peeters 10' (pen.); N'Dri 28'	Report	Francis 13'; Ueda 39'	Stadium: Kehrwegstadion; Referee: Bram Van Driessche

4 March 2023 28	Cercle Brugge	3–1	Seraing	Bruges
18:15 CEST	Siquet 31'; Ueda 32', 55'	Report	Mouandilmadji 3'	Stadium: Jan Breydel Stadium; Referee: Wim Smet

12 March 2023 29	Anderlecht	2–0	Cercle Brugge	Brussels
19:15 CEST	Slimani 9', 85'	Report		Stadium: Lotto Park; Referee: Bert Put

17 March 2023 30	Cercle Brugge	1–1	Genk	Bruges
20:45 CEST	Ueda 40'	Report	Paintsil 54'	Stadium: Jan Breydel Stadium; Referee: Jonathan Lardot

1 April 2023 31	Cercle Brugge	2–0	Kortrijk	Bruges
16:00 CEST	Somers 16'; Ueda 36' (pen.)	Report		Stadium: Jan Breydel Stadium; Referee: Nathan Verboomen

9 April 2023 32	Antwerp	2–1	Cercle Brugge	Antwerp
16:00 CEST	Popović 72' (o.g.); Alderweireld 85' (pen.)	Report	Hotić 42'	Stadium: Bosuilstadion; Referee: Bram Van Driessche

15 April 2023 33	Cercle Brugge	3–1	Sint-Truiden	Bruges
18:15 CEST	Ueda 41' (pen.), 45+2'; Denkey 84'	Report	Bruno 68' (pen.)	Stadium: Jan Breydel Stadium; Referee: Wim Smet

23 April 2023 34	Zulte Waregem	2–3	Cercle Brugge	Waregem
18:30 CEST	Willen 59'; Ndour 68'	Report	Siquet 6'; Ueda 8'; Somers 83'	Stadium: Elindus Arena; Referee: Erik Lambrechts

==== Play-offs II ====
Points obtained during the regular season were halved (and rounded up) before the start of the play-offs. Gent and Standard started on 28 points, Westerlo on 26, and Cercle Brugge on 25. As the points of Standard and Westerlo were rounded up, in case of ties they would always be ranked below the team (or teams) they are tied with. The deciding factor after that would be finishing position in the regular season.

Pos	Team	Pld	W	D	L	GF	GA	GD	Pts	Qualification or relegation	GNT	CER	STA	WES
1	Gent (F)	6	5	1	0	17	6	+11	44	Qualification for the Europa Conference League second qualifying round	—	2–2	3–1	3–1
2	Cercle Brugge	6	3	2	1	13	9	+4	36		0–4	—	0–0	2–0
3	Standard Liège	6	0	2	4	4	14	−10	30 (Note: Tied on Points and Points without half points added due to rounding. Regular Season finishing position: Standard Liège 6, Westerlo 7)		1–2	0–4	—	2–2
4	Westerlo	6	1	1	4	10	15	−5	30		1–3	3–5	3–0	—

Source: Jupiler Pro League (in Dutch), Soccerway
Legend: Blue = home team win; Yellow = draw; Red = away team win.
Rules for classification: 1) Points; 2) Points without (possible) half points added due to rounding; 3) Regular season finishing position.
(F) Play-off II winner
Notes:

29 April 2023 1	Cercle Brugge	0–0	Standard Liège	Bruges
18:15 CEST		Report		Stadium: Jan Breydel Stadium; Referee: Nathan Verboomen

7 May 2023 2	Westerlo	3–5	Cercle Brugge	Westerlo
13:30 CEST	Nene 39', 56', 75'	Report	Somers 5', 64'; Ueda 18' (pen.), 45+4' (pen.); Lopes 44'	Stadium: Het Kuipje; Referee: Lawrence Visser

13 May 2023 3	Cercle Brugge	0–4	Gent	Bruges
18:15 CEST		Report	Cuypers 41'; Orban 51', 64', 67'	Stadium: Jan Breydel Stadium; Referee: Jonathan Lardot

20 May 2023 4	Gent	2–2	Cercle Brugge	Ghent
20:45 CEST	Orban 49'; Cuypers 85'	Report	Denkey 18'; Ueda 70' (pen.)	Stadium: Ghelamco Arena; Referee: Erik Lambrechts

27 May 2023 5	Standard Liège	0–4	Cercle Brugge	Liège
20:45 CEST		Report	Marcelin 7'; Denkey 51'; Francis 64'; Ueda 90+2'	Stadium: Stade Maurice Dufrasne; Referee: Kevin Van Damme

3 June 2023 6	Cercle Brugge	2–0	Westerlo	Bruges
20:30 CEST	Van Eenoo 76' (o.g.); Gboho 89'	Report		Stadium: Jan Breydel Stadium; Referee: Wim Smet

=== Belgian Cup ===
9 November 2022 Sixth round	Cercle Brugge	3–1	Beerschot	Bruges
20:00 CET	Denkey 4', 49'; Ueda 46'	Report	Verlinden 42'	Stadium: Jan Breydel Stadium; Referee: Matonga Simonini

20 December 2022 Seventh round	Gent	2–0 (a.e.t.)	Cercle Brugge	Ghent
20:00 CET	Cuypers 110'; Fofana 120'	Report		Stadium: Ghelamco Arena; Referee: Nicolas Laforge
