= 2020–21 Cercle Brugge KSV season =

Cercle Brugge KSV
2020–21 season
- Owner: Dmitry Rybolovlev
- Chairman: Vincent Goemaere
- Manager: Paul Clement (until 1 February); Yves Vanderhaeghe (from 3 February)
- Stadium: Jan Breydel Stadium
- Belgian First Division A: 16th
- Belgian Cup: Quarter-finals
- Top goalscorer: League: Ike Ugbo (18); All: Ike Ugbo (19)
Home colours	Away colours	Third colours

The 2020–21 Cercle Brugge K.S.V. season was the club's 122nd season in existence and its 26th consecutive season in the top flight of Belgian football. In addition to the domestic league, Cercle Brugge participated in this season's edition of the Belgian Cup. The season covered the period from 1 July 2020 to 30 June 2021.

== Players ==
=== First-team squad ===
Note: Flags indicate national team as defined under FIFA eligibility rules; some limited exceptions apply. Players may hold more than one non-FIFA nationality.

No.	Pos.	Nation	Player
1	GK	FRA	Thomas Didillon
2	DF	BRA	Vitinho
3	DF	SCO	David Bates (on loan from Hamburger SV)
4	DF	FRA	Jérémy Taravel
6	MF	MLI	Aldom Deuro
7	FW	BEL	Kylian Hazard
8	DF	BEL	Robbe Decostere
9	FW	CAN	Ike Ugbo (on loan from Chelsea)
10	FW	BIH	Dino Hotić
11	FW	NED	Anthony Musaba (on loan from Monaco)
12	FW	TOG	Kévin Denkey
14	MF	BEL	Charles Vanhoutte
15	DF	SRB	Strahinja Pavlović (on loan from Monaco)
16	GK	BEL	Miguel Van Damme
17	DF	FRA	Serge-Philippe Raux-Yao
18	GK	BEL	Merveille Goblet

No.	Pos.	Nation	Player
19	DF	BUL	Dimitar Velkovski
20	MF	FRA	Kévin Hoggas
21	GK	BRA	Warleson
24	DF	FRA	Jean Marcelin (on loan from Monaco)
25	DF	BEL	Alexander Corryn
26	MF	BEL	Calvin Dekuyper
27	FW	BEL	Olivier Deman
28	MF	BEL	Hannes Van der Bruggen
32	DF	BEL	Arne Cassaert
34	MF	BEL	Thibo Somers
41	DF	FRA	Giulian Biancone (on loan from Monaco)
42	MF	POR	Leonardo Lopes
44	MF	BEL	Andi Koshi
89	GK	BEL	Sébastien Bruzzese
98	MF	SEN	Franck Kanouté

=== On loan ===
Note: Flags indicate national team as defined under FIFA eligibility rules; some limited exceptions apply. Players may hold more than one non-FIFA nationality.

No.	Pos.	Nation	Player
5	DF	JPN	Naomichi Ueda (on loan to Nîmes Olympique)
—	FW	FRA	Alimami Gory (on loan to ES Troyes AC)

== Pre-season and friendlies ==
Win Draw Loss

4 July 2020 Friendly	Zulte Waregem (Belgium)	2–2	(Belgium) Cercle Brugge	Waregem, Belgium
16:00 CEST (UTC+2)				Stadium: Regenboogstadion

11 July 2020 Friendly	Kortrijk (Belgium)	0–1	(Belgium) Cercle Brugge	Kortrijk, Belgium
15:00 CEST (UTC+2)				Stadium: Guldensporen Stadion

17 July 2020 Friendly	Cercle Brugge (Belgium)	0–2	(France) Monaco	Bruges, Belgium
18:30 CEST (UTC+2)			Ben Yedder 4'; Golovin 7'	Stadium: Jan Breydel Stadium; Attendance: 0

22 July 2020 Friendly	Sint-Eloois-Winkel (Belgium)	1–2	(Belgium) Cercle Brugge	Sint-Eloois-Winkel, Belgium
17:30 CEST (UTC+2)				Stadium: Sportpark Terschueren

25 July 2020 Friendly	Deinze (Belgium)	4–0	(Belgium) Cercle Brugge	Oostkamp, Belgium
16:00 CEST (UTC+2)				Stadium: KDC Ruddervoorde

29 July 2020 Friendly	Knokke (Belgium)	Cancelled	(Belgium) Cercle Brugge	Knokke, Belgium
19:00 CEST (UTC+2)				Stadium: Stadion Olivier

1 August 2020 Friendly	Oostende (Belgium)	3–1	(Belgium) Cercle Brugge	Ostend, Belgium
16:00 CEST (UTC+2)				Stadium: Versluys Arena

4 September 2020 Friendly	Cercle Brugge (Belgium)	1–1	(France) Dunkerque	Bruges, Belgium
13:00 CEST (UTC+2)	Hotić 89' (pen.)		Vialla 84'	Stadium: Jan Breydel Stadium; Attendance: 0

== Competitions ==
=== Overview ===
Competition	First match	Last match	Starting round	Final position	Record							
Competition	First match	Last match	Starting round	Final position	Pld	W	D	L	GF	GA	GD	Win %
Belgian First Division A	8 August 2020	18 April 2021	Matchday 1	16th	34	11	3	20	40	51	−11	32.35
Belgian Cup	3 February 2021	3 March 2021	Sixth round	Quarter-finals	3	2	0	1	6	4	+2	66.67
Total					37	13	3	21	46	55	−9	35.14

Source: Soccerway

=== Belgian First Division A ===
==== League table ====
Pos	Team	Pld	W	D	L	GF	GA	GD	Pts	Qualification or relegation
14	Kortrijk	34	11	6	17	44	57	−13	39	
15	Sint-Truiden	34	10	8	16	41	52	−11	38	
16	Cercle Brugge	34	11	3	20	40	51	−11	36	
17	Waasland-Beveren (R)	34	8	7	19	44	70	−26	31	Qualification for the Relegation play-off
18	Excel Mouscron (Note: On 14 April 2021 news was released that both Excel Mouscron and Oostende had not received a Belgian professional football license for the coming season, a requirement to play at the top two levels of Belgian football. For Oostende, a lack of financial transparency, together with generally poor quality and incompleteness of the submitted report, was given as the main reason by the committee for not awarding a license, while Excel Mouscron was refused a license as besides insufficient transparency, the committee also questioned several cash flows and whether the club was creditworthy in general, also due to the fact that the wages for the months of February and March had not yet been paid at that point. For Excel Mouscron, it was already the sixth year running the license was (initially) refused, however, the club has appealed the decision with the Belgian Court for Sports Arbitrage (BAS) successfully on each occasion and intended to do so again. Oostende was planning to launch an appeal as well, with the BAS to rule on the matter for both clubs before the 10th of May. Both clubs were allowed to add new documents to their case, but in case they however still did not receive a license after appeal, knew they would have been forced to relegate to the 2021–22 Belgian Division 2 and start the season with a 3-point penalty. Both Excel Mouscron and Oostende were however eventually awarded a license after appeal, meaning Oostende remained at the top level, while Excel Mouscron only dropped one level.) (R)	34	7	10	17	32	54	−22	31	Relegation to First Division B

Source: Jupiler Pro League (in Dutch), Soccerway
Rules for classification: 1) Points; 2) Matches won; 3) Goal difference; 4) Goals scored; 5) Away matches won; 6) Away goal difference; 7) Away goals scored; 8) Play-off.
(R) Relegated

==== Results summary ====
Overall								Home						Away					
Pld	W	D	L	GF	GA	GD	Pts	W	D	L	GF	GA	GD	W	D	L	GF	GA	GD
34	11	3	20	40	51	−11	36	6	1	10	25	26	−1	5	2	10	15	25	−10

Source: Jupiler Pro League

==== Results by round ====
Round	1	2	3	4	5	6	7	8	9	10	11	12	13	14	15	16	17	18	19	20	21	22	23	24	25	26	27	28	29	30	31	32	33	34
Ground	A	H	A	H	A	H	A	A	H	H	A	H	A	H	A	H	A	H	A	H	A	A	H	A	H	H	A	H	A	H	A	H	H	A
Result	L	W	W	L	L	W	L	W	W	L	L	L	W	L	L	L	D	L	L	L	L	W	L	L	L	D	W	W	L	L	L	W	W	D
Position	16	9	4	7	7	7	10	9	6	9	10	11	9	10						17	18	17	17	17	17	17	16	16	17	17	16	16	16	16

Source: Jupiler Pro League
A = Away; H = Home; W = Win; D = Draw; L = Loss

==== Matches ====
The league fixtures were announced on 8 July 2020.

8 August 2020 1	Standard Liège	1–0	Cercle Brugge	Liège
19:00 CEST (UTC+2)	Bastien 55'; Avenatti (yellow card) 59'	Report	Hotić (yellow card) 77'	Stadium: Stade Maurice Dufrasne; Attendance: 0 Referee: Jonathan Lardot

16 August 2020 2	Cercle Brugge	2–1	Antwerp	Bruges
13:30 CEST (UTC+2)	Omolo (yellow card) 31'; Mbenza 80', 86'	Report	Gerkens 32'; Mbokani (yellow card) 65'	Stadium: Jan Breydel Stadium; Attendance: 0 Referee: Wim Smet

22 August 2020 3	KV Mechelen	2–3	Cercle Brugge	Mechelen
18:30 CEST (UTC+2)	Togui 37'; Vranckx 64', (yellow card) 72'; De Camargo (yellow card) 82'; Kaya (yellow card) 88'; Bijker (yellow card) 90+5'	Report	Omolo (yellow card) 29'; Ugbo 54'; Hotić 57'; Taravel (yellow card) 76'; Somers 80'	Stadium: Achter de Kazerne; Attendance: 0 Referee: Kevin Van Damme

29 August 2020 4	Cercle Brugge	0–1	Kortrijk	Bruges
18:30 CEST (UTC+2)	Omolo (yellow card) 39'; Vanhoutte (yellow card) 42'	Report	Makarenko (yellow card) 23'; D'haene (yellow card) 31'; Golubović (yellow card) 51'; Selemani 67'	Stadium: Jan Breydel Stadium; Attendance: 0 Referee: Christof Dierick

13 September 2020 5	Anderlecht	2–0	Cercle Brugge	Anderlecht
13:30 CEST (UTC+2)	Nmecha 36' (pen.); Vranješ (yellow card) 43'; Murillo 68'	Report	Bates (yellow card) 33'; Omolo (yellow card) 38'; Decostere (yellow card) 59'; Kanouté (yellow card) 83'	Stadium: Constant Vanden Stock Stadium; Attendance: 6,000; Referee: Nicolas Laforge

21 September 2020 6	Cercle Brugge	3–0	Sint-Truiden	Bruges
20:45 CEST (UTC+2)	Hotić 25'; Ugbo 31' (pen.); Omolo (yellow card) 67'; Vitinho 90+1'	Report	Matsubara (yellow card) 13'; Colombatto (yellow card) 18'; Durkin (yellow card) 35'	Stadium: Jan Breydel Stadium; Attendance: 2,000; Referee: Wesli De Cremer

27 September 2020 7	Club Brugge	2–1	Cercle Brugge	Bruges
18:15 CEST (UTC+2)	Diatta 22'; Deli 68'; Krmenčík (yellow card) 90+6'	Report	Musaba 46'; Marcelin (yellow card) 58'; Hazard (yellow card) 69'	Stadium: Jan Breydel Stadium; Attendance: 9,500; Referee: Lawrence Visser

3 October 2020 8	Eupen	1–2	Cercle Brugge	Eupen
18:30 CEST (UTC+2)	Peeters (yellow card) 14'; Musona (yellow card) 31'; Ngoy 39'; Amat (yellow card) 43'; Koch (yellow card) 84'; Adriano (yellow card) 90'	Report	Hazard 5', (yellow card) 47'; Taravel (yellow card) 46'; Musaba 76'; Somers (yellow card) 89'; Ugbo (yellow card) 90+3'	Stadium: Kehrwegstadion; Attendance: 1,340; Referee: Jasper Vergoote

17 October 2020 9	Cercle Brugge	5–2	Gent	Bruges
16:15 CEST (UTC+2)	Kanouté 4'; Hotić 31' (pen.); Ugbo 57', 78'; Marcelin 82'	Report	Hanche-Olsen 14'; Yaremchuk 64' (pen.)	Stadium: Jan Breydel Stadium; Attendance: 2,500; Referee: Nathan Verboomen

31 October 2020 11	Charleroi	3–0	Cercle Brugge	Charleroi
18:30 CET (UTC+1)	Gholizadeh 53'; Berahino 58'; Morioka (yellow card) 68'; Nicholson 82'; Kayembe (yellow card) 90+2'	Report	Bates (yellow card) 48'	Stadium: Stade du Pays de Charleroi; Attendance: 0 Referee: Christof Dierick

8 November 2020 12	Cercle Brugge	1–3	Zulte Waregem	Bruges
20:45 CET (UTC+1)	Musaba (yellow card) 30'; Hotić (yellow card) 43'; Ugbo 67'; Biancone (yellow card) 90+3'	Report	Chorý 6', (yellow card) 81'; Bruno 31', 78'; Bianda (yellow card) 39'; Srarfi (yellow card) 60'	Stadium: Jan Breydel Stadium; Attendance: 0 Referee: Jonathan Lardot

21 November 2020 13	Waasland-Beveren	0–2	Cercle Brugge	Beveren
18:30 CET (UTC+1)	Mandjeck (yellow card) 45'; Vukotić (yellow card) 84' (yellow-red card) 84'; Koita (yellow card) 85'	Report	Vitinho (yellow card) 4'; Ugbo 43', 82'; Biancone (yellow card) 52'; Somers (yellow card) 65'	Stadium: Freethiel Stadion; Attendance: 0 Referee: Bram van Driessche

25 November 2020 10	Cercle Brugge	1–2	Excel Mouscron	Bruges
17:00 CET (UTC+1)	Vitinho (yellow card) 25'; Biancone (yellow card) 27'; Musaba 64'; Lopes (yellow card) 86'; Hoggas (yellow card) 90+9'	Report	Bocat (yellow card) 20'; Onana (yellow card) 30'; Silvestre 81'; Gnohéré 87' (pen.)	Stadium: Jan Breydel Stadium; Attendance: 0 Referee: Jan Boterberg

28 November 2020 14	Cercle Brugge	1–5	Genk	Bruges
18:30 CET (UTC+1)	Hotić (yellow card) 33', (goal) 51'; Marcelin (yellow card) 62'	Report	Onuachu 9', 38'; Ito 16'; Heynen 30'; Bongonda 74'	Stadium: Jan Breydel Stadium; Attendance: 0 Referee: Kevin Van Damme

5 December 2020 15	OH Leuven	2–1	Cercle Brugge	Leuven
18:30 CET (UTC+1)	Sowah 10'; Mercier (yellow card) 42'; Henry 54'; Maertens (red card) 78'; Hubert (yellow card) 81'	Report	Kanouté (yellow card) 50'; Taravel (yellow card) 81'; Ugbo 90+1'	Stadium: Den Dreef; Attendance: 0 Referee: Nathan Verboomen

12 December 2020 16	Cercle Brugge	0–1	Oostende	Bruges
18:30 CET (UTC+1)	Omolo (yellow card) 39'; Bates (yellow card) 52'; Vanhoutte (yellow card) 62'	Report	Vandendriessche 29'	Stadium: Jan Breydel Stadium; Attendance: 0 Referee: Jasper Vergoote

15 December 2020 18	Cercle Brugge	3–4	Charleroi	Bruges
18:45 CET (UTC+1)	Ugbo 17', 25'; Musaba 85'	Report	Gholizadeh 63'; Nicholson 64'; Morioka 70'; Bruno 87'	Stadium: Jan Breydel Stadium; Attendance: 0 Referee: Wesley Alen

26 December 2020 19	Zulte Waregem	1–0	Cercle Brugge	Waregem
16:15 CET (UTC+1)	Dompé 83'	Report		Stadium: Regenboogstadion; Attendance: 0 Referee: Christof Dierick

9 January 2021 30	Cercle Brugge	1–2	Eupen	Bruges
18:30 CET (UTC+1)	Hoggas 53'	Report	Prevljak 69', 76'	Stadium: Jan Breydel Stadium; Attendance: 0 Referee: Jan Boterberg

13 January 2021 17	Beerschot	1–1	Cercle Brugge	Antwerp
18:30 CET (UTC+1)	Vorogovskiy (yellow card) 14'; Suzuki 22'; Sanusi (yellow card) 89'	Report	Hazard (yellow card) 57'; Musaba 89'	Stadium: Olympisch Stadion; Attendance: 0 Referee: Wim Smet

17 January 2021 20	Cercle Brugge	0–1	Standard Liège	Bruges
16:00 CET (UTC+1)	Ugbo (yellow card) 85'	Report	Lestienne 11'; Tapsoba (yellow card) 88'	Stadium: Jan Breydel Stadium; Attendance: 0 Referee: Bert Put

20 January 2021 21	Antwerp	1–0	Cercle Brugge	Antwerp
21:00 CET (UTC+1)	Boya (yellow card) 37'; Lamkel Zé 84', (yellow card) 84'	Report	Kanouté (yellow card) 41'; Musaba (yellow card) 79'; Bates (yellow card) 90+1'	Stadium: Bosuilstadion; Attendance: 0 Referee: Alexandre Boucaut

23 January 2021 22	Kortrijk	1–2	Cercle Brugge	Kortrijk
18:30 CET (UTC+1)				Stadium: Guldensporen Stadion; Attendance: 0

28 January 2021 23	Cercle Brugge	1–2	Club Brugge	Bruges
18:45 CET (UTC+1)	Musaba 28'	Report	Mechele 37'; Denswil (yellow card) 54'; Lang 58'; Rits (yellow card) 79'	Stadium: Jan Breydel Stadium; Attendance: 0 Referee: Nathan Verboomen

31 January 2021 24	Sint-Truiden	3–0	Cercle Brugge	Sint-Truiden
20:45 CET (UTC+1)	Brüls 17'; Buatu (yellow card) 49'; Teixeira 64'; Cacace (yellow card) 83'; Colidio (yellow card) 90+1'; Durkin 90+4'	Report	Pavlović (yellow card) 28'; Marcelin (yellow card) 90+3'	Stadium: Stayen; Attendance: 0 Referee: Jonathan Lardot

6 February 2021 25	Cercle Brugge	0–1	KV Mechelen	Bruges
18:30 CET (UTC+1)	Somers (yellow card) 73'; Van der Bruggen (yellow card) 77'	Report	Druijf (yellow card) 85'; De Camargo 87'	Stadium: Jan Breydel Stadium; Attendance: 0 Referee: Jan Boterberg

14 February 2021 26	Cercle Brugge	0–0	Anderlecht	Bruges
20:45 CET (UTC+1)	Marcelin (yellow card) 50'	Report	Murillo (yellow card) 61'	Stadium: Jan Breydel Stadium; Attendance: 0 Referee: Nicolas Laforge

20 February 2021 27	Excel Mouscron	1–2	Cercle Brugge	Mouscron
18:30 CET (UTC+1)	Mohamed (yellow card) 20'; Bakić (yellow card) 28'; Tabekou (yellow card) 45+1'; Onana (yellow card) 67'; Lepoint 90+1'	Report	Ugbo 13'; Pavlović (yellow card) 78'; Denkey 88'; Didillon (yellow card) 90+5'	Stadium: Stade Le Canonnier; Attendance: 0 Referee: Jonathan Lardot

27 February 2021 28	Cercle Brugge	2–0	Waasland-Beveren	Bruges
16:15 CET (UTC+1)	Lopes 29', (yellow card) 45'; Deman (yellow card) 63'; Denkey 82'	Report	Heltne Nilsen (yellow card) 24'; Bastians (yellow card) 55'; Wuytens (yellow card) 80'; Schryvers (yellow card) 86'; Leuko (yellow card) 90+5'	Stadium: Jan Breydel Stadium; Attendance: 0 Referee: Nicolas Laforge

7 March 2021 29	Genk	2–0	Cercle Brugge	Genk
20:45 CET (UTC+1)	Onuachu 9'; Ito 24'; Heynen (yellow card) 37'	Report	Marcelin (yellow card) 20'; Van der Bruggen (yellow card) 27' (yellow-red card) 39'; Pavlović (yellow card) 87'	Stadium: Luminus Arena; Attendance: 0 Referee: Alexandre Boucaut

21 March 2021 31	Gent	1–0	Cercle Brugge	Ghent
20:45 CET (UTC+1)	Yaremchuk (yellow card) 67'; Castro-Montes (penalty missed) 81', 81'; Kums (yellow card) 85'	Report	Lopes (yellow card) 14'; Ugbo (yellow card) 51'	Stadium: Ghelamco Arena; Attendance: 0 Referee: Jonathan Lardot

4 April 2021 32	Cercle Brugge	2–1	Beerschot	Bruges
13:30 CEST (UTC+2)	Biancone 18', (yellow card) 49'; Ugbo 34' (pen.), (yellow card) 73'; Velkovski (red card) 38'; Lopes (yellow card) 44'	Report	Sanusi (yellow card) 33'; Van den Bergh 50'	Stadium: Jan Breydel Stadium; Attendance: 0 Referee: Bram Van Driessche

10 April 2021 33	Cercle Brugge	3–0	OH Leuven	Bruges
16:15 CEST (UTC+2)	Hoggas (red card) 33'; Ugbo 44', 56'; Taravel (yellow card) 58', (goal) 73'; Van der Bruggen (yellow card) 69'; Decostere (yellow card) 77'; Deman (yellow card) 82'	Report	De Norre (yellow card) 54'	Stadium: Jan Breydel Stadium; Attendance: 0 Referee: Lothar D'hondt

18 April 2021 34	Oostende	1–1	Cercle Brugge	Ostend
18:00 CEST (UTC+2)	Hendry (yellow card) 79'; Kvasina 90+2'; Ndicka (yellow card) 90+5'	Report	Ugbo 49'; Corryn (yellow card) 64'; Biancone (yellow card) 79'	Stadium: Diaz Arena; Attendance: 0 Referee: Alexandre Boucaut

=== Belgian Cup ===
3 February 2021 Sixth round	OH Leuven	2–3	Cercle Brugge	Leuven
18:00 CET (UTC+1)	Maertens 3'; Eppiah (yellow card) 17'; Hubert 90+3'	Report	Hotić 1' (pen.); Marcelin 39', (red card) 81'; Taravel 73' (pen.); Musaba (yellow card) 82'	Stadium: Den Dreef; Attendance: 0

9 February 2021 Seventh round	Cercle Brugge	3–1	Oostende	Bruges
18:00 CET (UTC+1)	Deman 32', (yellow card) 34'; Denkey (yellow card) 61', (goal) 64'; Van der Bruggen (yellow card) 83'; Ugbo 90'	Report	Bätzner 29'; Thiam (yellow card) 90+1'	Stadium: Jan Breydel Stadium; Attendance: 0 Referee: Bert Put

3 March 2021 Quarter-finals	Anderlecht	1–0	Cercle Brugge	Anderlecht
20:45 CET (UTC+1)	Nmecha 13'; Wellenreuther (yellow card) 86'	Report	Marcelin (yellow card) 23'; Corryn (yellow card) 45'	Stadium: Constant Vanden Stock Stadium; Attendance: 0 Referee: Bram Van Driessche

== Statistics ==
=== Squad appearances and goals ===
Last updated on 17 January 2021.

No.	Pos	Nat	Player	Total		Belgian Division		Belgian Cup	
No.	Pos	Nat	Player	Apps	Goals	Apps	Goals	Apps	Goals
Goalkeepers
1	GK	(France) FRA	Thomas Didillon	18	0	18	0	0	0
16	GK	(Belgium) BEL	Miguel Van Damme	0	0	0	0	0	0
18	GK	(Belgium) BEL	Merveille Goblet	0	0	0	0	0	0
21	GK	(Brazil) BRA	Warleson	3	0	3	0	0	0
Defenders
2	DF	(Brazil) BRA	Vitinho	16	1	12+4	1	0	0
3	DF	(Scotland) SCO	David Bates	8	0	8	0	0	0
4	DF	(France) FRA	Jérémy Taravel	14	0	14	0	0	0
5	DF	(Japan) JPN	Naomichi Ueda	8	0	7+1	0	0	0
8	DF	(Belgium) BEL	Robbe Decostere	12	0	12	0	0	0
17	DF	(France) FRA	Serge-Philippe Raux-Yao	2	0	1+1	0	0	0
19	DF	(Bulgaria) BUL	Dimitar Velkovski	12	0	10+2	0	0	0
24	DF	(France) FRA	Jean Marcelin	12	1	12	1	0	0
25	DF	(Belgium) BEL	Alexander Corryn	9	0	4+5	0	0	0
32	DF	(Belgium) BEL	Arne Cassaert	0	0	0	0	0	0
41	DF	(France) FRA	Giulian Biancone	7	0	6+1	0	0	0
Midfielders
6	MF	(Mali) MLI	Aldom Deuro	0	0	0	0	0	0
14	MF	(Belgium) BEL	Charles Vanhoutte	17	0	10+7	0	0	0
20	MF	(France) FRA	Kévin Hoggas	20	1	19+1	1	0	0
26	MF	(Belgium) BEL	Calvin Dekuyper	1	0	0+1	0	0	0
34	MF	(Belgium) BEL	Thibo Somers	15	1	1+14	1	0	0
42	MF	(Portugal) POR	Leonardo Lopes	11	0	5+6	0	0	0
44	MF	(Belgium) BEL	Andi Koshi	0	0	0	0	0	0
98	MF	(Senegal) SEN	Franck Kanouté	13	1	12+1	1	0	0
Forwards
7	FW	(Belgium) BEL	Kylian Hazard	18	1	15+3	1	0	0
9	FW	(England) ENG	Ike Ugbo	19	10	19	10	0	0
10	FW	(Bosnia and Herzegovina) BIH	Dino Hotić	19	4	18+1	4	0	0
11	FW	(Netherlands) NED	Anthony Musaba	18	5	17+1	5	0	0
12	FW	(Togo) TOG	Kévin Denkey	1	0	0+1	0	0	0
27	FW	(Belgium) BEL	Oliver Deman	0	0	0	0	0	0
Players who have made an appearance this season but have left the club
15	MF	(Kenya) KEN	Johanna Omolo	10	0	6+4	0	0	0
