= 2019–20 Cercle Brugge KSV season =

Cercle Brugge K.S.V.
2019–20 season
- Owner: Dmitry Rybolovlev
- Chairman: Vincent Goemaere
- Manager: Bernd Storck
- Stadium: Jan Breydel Stadium
- First Division A: 14th
- Belgian Cup: Sixth round
- Top goalscorer: League: Kévin Hoggas; Stef Peeters (6 each); All: Kévin Hoggas; Stef Peeters (6 each)
Home colours	Away colours	Third colours

The 2019–20 Cercle Brugge K.S.V. season was the club's 121st season in existence and the 25th consecutive season in the top flight of Belgian football. In addition to the domestic league, Cercle Brugge participated in this season's edition of the Belgian Cup.

== Players ==
As of 21 January 2020

Note: Flags indicate national team as defined under FIFA eligibility rules; some limited exceptions apply. Players may hold more than one non-FIFA nationality.

No.	Pos.	Nation	Player
1	GK	BEL	Guillaume Hubert (on loan from Brugge)
2	DF	BRA	Vitinho
3	DF	GRE	Dimitris Chatziisaias (on loan from Rizespor)
4	DF	FRA	Jérémy Taravel
5	DF	JPN	Naomichi Ueda
6	MF	MLI	Aldom Deuro
7	FW	BEL	Kylian Hazard
8	MF	BEL	Stef Peeters
9	FW	BEL	Dylan De Belder
10	FW	BIH	Dino Hotić
13	FW	RSA	Lyle Foster (on loan from Monaco)
14	DF	ENG	Jonathan Panzo (on loan from Monaco)
15	MF	KEN	Johanna Omolo
16	GK	BEL	Miguel Van Damme
17	FW	ESP	Jordi Mboula (on loan from Monaco)
18	MF	MLI	Lassana Coulibaly (on loan from Angers)

No.	Pos.	Nation	Player
19	FW	HUN	Marton Eppel
20	MF	FRA	Kévin Hoggas
21	GK	BRA	Warleson
22	DF	CIV	Yves Dabila (on loan from Lille)
23	MF	WAL	Isaac Christie-Davies (on loan from Liverpool)
26	MF	BEL	Calvin Dekuyper
27	MF	BEL	Oliver Deman
28	FW	FRA	Alimami Gory
30	MF	GHA	Godfred Donsah (on loan from Bologna)
32	DF	BEL	Arne Cassaert
34	MF	BEL	Thibo Somers
35	DF	BUL	Dimitar Velkovski
41	DF	FRA	Giulian Biancone (on loan from Monaco)
83	GK	TUN	Mouez Hassen
99	GK	GER	Lennart Moser (on loan from Union Berlin)

=== On loan ===
Note: Flags indicate national team as defined under FIFA eligibility rules; some limited exceptions apply. Players may hold more than one non-FIFA nationality.

No.	Pos.	Nation	Player
11	FW	FRA	Aboubakary Kanté (at Le Mans until 30 June 2020)

== Pre-season and friendlies ==
Win Draw Loss

3 July 2019 Friendly	Cercle Brugge (Belgium)	2–3	(Belgium) Zulte Waregem	Lichtervelde
19:00 CEST (UTC+2)				Stadium: Stadion Lichtervelde

== Competitions ==
=== Overall record ===
Competition	First match	Last match	Starting round	Final position	Record							
Competition	First match	Last match	Starting round	Final position	Pld	W	D	L	GF	GA	GD	Win %
First Division A	27 July 2019	7 March 2020	Matchday 1	14th	29	7	2	20	27	54	−27	24.14
Belgian Cup	24 September 2019		Sixth round	Sixth round	1	0	0	1	0	1	−1	0.00
Total					30	7	2	21	27	55	−28	23.33

Source: Competitions

=== First Division A ===
==== League table ====
Pos	Team	Pld	W	D	L	GF	GA	GD	Pts	Qualification or relegation
12	Sint-Truiden	29	9	6	14	36	53	−17	33	
13	Eupen	29	8	6	15	28	51	−23	30	
14	Cercle Brugge	29	7	2	20	27	54	−27	23	
15	Oostende	29	6	4	19	29	58	−29	22	
16	Waasland-Beveren (Note: Waasland-Beveren would have been relegated due to finishing last, however following legal proceedings the Belgian Pro League eventually voted in favour of expanding the 2020–21 Belgian First Division A to 18 teams, meaning Waasland-Beveren was spared and both OH Leuven and Beerschot were promoted from the 2019–20 Belgian First Division B.) (T)	29	5	5	19	21	60	−39	20	Reprieved from relegation

Source: Belgian First Division A (in Dutch), Soccerway
Rules for classification: 1) Points; 2) Matches won; 3) Goal difference; 4) Goals scored; 5) Away goals scored; 6) Away matches won; 7) Play-off.
(T) Reprieved

==== Results by round ====
Round	1	2	3	4	5	6	7	8	9	10	11	12	13	14	15	16	17	18	19	20	21	22	23	24	25	26	27	28	29	30
Ground	H	A	H	A	H	A	H	A	H	A	H	A	H	A	H	A	A	H	A	H	A	H	H	A	H	A	A	H	A	H
Result	L	L	L	L	W	L	L	L	L	L	L	L	D	L	W	D	L	L	L	W	L	L	L	L	W	W	W	W	L	C
Position	14	12	16	16	13	14	14	14	16	16	16	16	16	16	16	16	16	16	16	16	16	16	16	16	16	16	15	14	14	14

Source: Jupiler Pro League
A = Away; H = Home; W = Win; D = Draw; L = Loss

==== Matches ====
On 2 April 2020, the Jupiler Pro League's board of directors proposed to cancel the season due to the COVID-19 pandemic. The General Assembly accepted the proposal on 15 May, and officially ended the 2019–20 season.

27 July 2019 1	Cercle Brugge	0–2	Standard Liège	Bruges
18:00 CEST (UTC+2)	Serrano (yellow card) 85' (yellow-red card) 90+2'	Report	Bastien (yellow card) 30'; Emond 88'; Limbombe 90+4'	Stadium: Jan Breydel Stadium; Attendance: 4,311; Referee: Alexandre Boucaut

3 August 2019 2	Oostende	3–1	Cercle Brugge	Ostend
20:00 CEST (UTC+2)	Guri 32', 87'; Saadi 40' (o.g.)		Saadi 7'; Mboula (red card) 54'	Stadium: Versluys Arena

10 August 2019 3	Cercle Brugge	1–3	Kortrijk	Bruges
18:00 CEST (UTC+2)	Saadi 18'		Ajagun 49'; Van der Bruggen 55'; Kage 90'	Stadium: Jan Breydel Stadium

17 August 2019 4	Mechelen	3–1	Cercle Brugge	Mechelen
20:30 CEST (UTC+2)	Togui 60'; Storm 67' (pen.); De Camargo 83'		Dabila 24'	Stadium: Achter de Kazerne

24 August 2019 5	Cercle Brugge	1–0	Waasland-Beveren	Bruges
18:00 CEST (UTC+2)	Peeters 82'			Stadium: Jan Breydel Stadium

1 September 2019 6	Gent	3–2	Cercle Brugge	Ghent
20:00 CEST (UTC+2)	Depoitre 11'; David 24', 27'; Mohammadi (yellow card) 36'	Report	Peeters 15', 90+2', (yellow card) 29'; Kouamé (yellow card) 45'; Saadi (yellow card) 53'; Fiore (yellow card) 77'	Stadium: Ghelamco Arena; Attendance: 17,525; Referee: Bram Van Driessche

14 September 2019 7	Cercle Brugge	0–2	Club Brugge	Bruges
20:30 CEST (UTC+2)	Biancone (yellow card) 13'	Report	Diatta 32'; Álvarez (yellow card) 53'; Dennis 61', (yellow card) 62'	Stadium: Jan Breydel Stadium; Attendance: 12,120; Referee: Nicolas Laforge

21 September 2019 8	Antwerp	3–1	Cercle Brugge	Antwerp
20:00 CEST (UTC+2)				Stadium: Bosuilstadion; Referee: Kevin Van Damme

28 September 2019 9	Cercle Brugge	1–2	Eupen	Bruges
20:00 CEST (UTC+2)	Peeters 12' (pen.); Panzo (yellow card) 90' (yellow-red card) 90+4'		Milićević 76', 88'	Stadium: Jan Breydel Stadium; Referee: Wesli De Cremer

5 October 2019 10	Zulte Waregem	6–0	Cercle Brugge	Waregem
20:30 CEST (UTC+2)	Larin 13', 90+1'; Bruno 24', 73'; Taravel 75' (o.g.); Berahino 85'			Stadium: Regenboogstadion

20 October 2019 11	Cercle Brugge	0–3	Charleroi	Bruges
20:00 CEST (UTC+2)				Stadium: Jan Breydel Stadium

26 October 2019 12	Genk	1–0	Cercle Brugge	Genk
20:30 CEST (UTC+2)	Dewaest 8'	Report	Dekuyper (yellow card) 76'; Donsah (yellow card) 81'	Stadium: Luminus Arena; Referee: Bert Put

29 October 2019 13	Cercle Brugge	2–2	Excel Mouscron	Bruges
18:00 CET (UTC+1)				Stadium: Jan Breydel Stadium

3 November 2019 14	Anderlecht	2–1	Cercle Brugge	Anderlecht
20:00 CET (UTC+1)				Stadium: Constant Vanden Stock Stadium

9 November 2019 15	Cercle Brugge	2–1	Sint-Truiden	Bruges
18:00 CET (UTC+1)				Stadium: Jan Breydel Stadium

23 November 2019 16	Waasland-Beveren	1–1	Cercle Brugge	Beveren
20:30 CET (UTC+1)				Stadium: Freethiel Stadion

1 December 2019 17	Standard Liège	2–1	Cercle Brugge	Liège
18:00 CET (UTC+1)	Amallah 28'; Vanheusden (yellow card) 50'; Avenatti 90+2'	Report	Cassaert (yellow card) 24'; Omolo (yellow card) 47', (goal) 75'; Foster (yellow card) 63'; Panzo (yellow card) 71'	Stadium: Stade Maurice Dufrasne; Attendance: 26,592; Referee: Erik Lambrechts

7 December 2019 18	Cercle Brugge	1–2	Genk	Bruges
20:00 CET (UTC+1)	Somers 65'; Dekuyper (yellow card) 86'	Report	Ito 34'; Borges (yellow card) 45+7'; Mæhle (yellow card) 57'; Berge 70', (yellow card) 84'	Stadium: Jan Breydel Stadium; Referee: Nathan Verboomen

14 December 2019 19	Charleroi	3–0	Cercle Brugge	Charleroi
20:00 CET (UTC+1)				Stadium: Stade du Pays de Charleroi; Referee: Nicolas Laforge

21 December 2019 20	Cercle Brugge	2–0	Zulte Waregem	Bruges
20:00 CET (UTC+1)	Foster 35'; Gory 90+4'			Stadium: Jan Breydel Stadium

26 December 2019 21	Kortrijk	1–0	Cercle Brugge	Kortrijk
20:30 CET (UTC+1)	Kagelmacher 81'			Stadium: Guldensporen Stadion

19 January 2020 22	Cercle Brugge	1–2	Antwerp	Bruges
18:00 CET (UTC+1)	Hoggas 2' (pen.)		Hoedt (red card) 7'; Refaelov 13'; De Sart 55'	Stadium: Jan Breydel Stadium

26 January 2020 23	Cercle Brugge	1–2	Anderlecht	Bruges
18:00 CET (UTC+1)	Hoggas 33'		Amuzu 87'; Vlap 90+4'	Stadium: Jan Breydel Stadium

1 February 2020 24	Eupen	1–0	Cercle Brugge	Eupen
20:00 CET (UTC+1)	Beck 24'		Hoggas (penalty missed) 89'	Stadium: Kehrwegstadion; Referee: Wesley Alen

8 February 2020 25	Cercle Brugge	3–2	Mechelen	Bruges
18:00 CET (UTC+1)				Stadium: Jan Breydel Stadium

15 February 2020 26	Sint-Truiden	0–1	Cercle Brugge	Sint-Truiden
20:30 CET (UTC+1)			Hoggas 63'	Stadium: Stayen

22 February 2020 27	Excel Mouscron	0–1	Cercle Brugge	Mouscron
20:30 CET (UTC+1)			De Belder 75'	Stadium: Stade Le Canonnier

1 March 2020 28	Cercle Brugge	1–0	Gent	Bruges
20:00 CET (UTC+1)	Hoggas 1'; Biancone (yellow card) 73'; Moser (yellow card) 90+7'	Report	Plastun (yellow card) 90+4'	Stadium: Jan Breydel Stadium; Attendance: 29,472; Referee: Lawrence Visser

7 March 2020 29	Club Brugge	2–1	Cercle Brugge	Bruges
20:00 CET (UTC+1)	Vanaken 39'; Diatta 59'	Report	Hazard 90+1'	Stadium: Jan Breydel Stadium; Referee: Wesley Alen

15 March 2020 30	Cercle Brugge	Cancelled	Oostende	Bruges
18:00 CET (UTC+1)				Stadium: Jan Breydel Stadium
Note: The match was cancelled due to the COVID-19 pandemic.

=== Belgian Cup ===
24 September 2019 Sixth round	Cercle Brugge	0–1	Rebecq	Bruges
20:00 CEST (UTC+2)		report	Rosy 10'	Stadium: Jan Breydel Stadium
