= Robbe Decostere =

Belgian footballer (born 1998)

Personal information
- Date of birth: 8 May 1998 (age 28)
- Place of birth: Kortemark, Belgium
- Height: 1.78 m (5 ft 10 in)
- Position: Right-back

Team information
- Current team: Roeselare
- Number: 4

Youth career
- 2003–2005: SVD Kortemark
- 2005–2009: Roeselare
- 2009–2014: Club Brugge
- 2014–2018: Cercle Brugge

Senior career*
Years	Team	Apps	(Gls)
2018–2023	Cercle Brugge	58	(0)
2019–2020	→ Tubize (loan)	17	(0)
2023–2024	Zulte Waregem	16	(3)
2025	Union SG U23	11	(0)
2025–	Roeselare	26	(0)
- * Club domestic league appearances and goals as of 3 May 2026

Robbe Decostere (born 8 May 1998) is a Belgian professional footballer who plays as a right-back for Roeselare.

== Career ==
Decostere progressed through the youth teams of SVD Kortemark, Roeselare, Club Brugge before finally ending up in the youth academy of Cercle Brugge. In July 2018, he was promoted to the first team and signed his first professional contract alongside fellow youth prospect Charles Vanhoutte.

On 2 March 2019, manager Laurent Guyot gave Decostere his debut in the Belgian First Division A against Kortrijk. Fifteen minutes before full-time, Decostere came onto the pitch to replace the injured Guévin Tormin. In his first season, he made four appearances in the league.

On 1 September 2019, Decostere was sent on loan to Tubize together with teammate Charles Vanhoutte on a one-year deal. Decostere played regularly but was unable to prevent the club from suffering relegation to the Belgian Division 2.

After his loan spell, Decostere became a permanent starter at Cercle Brugge, where he signed a contract extension until June 2023 in December 2020, just like fellow academy players Vanhoutte and Thibo Somers.

On 6 September 2023, Decostere signed a one-season contract with Zulte Waregem.

After going 6 months without a club, Decostere signed for Union SG in February 2025.

== Personal life ==
He co-owns a finance and investment business called Cash & Compound.

== Career statistics ==
As of February 2025

Appearances and goals by club, season and competition
Club	Season	League			Cup		Europe		Other		Total	
Club	Season	Division	Apps	Goals	Apps	Goals	Apps	Goals	Apps	Goals	Apps	Goals
Cercle Brugge	2018–19	First Division A	4	0	0	0	—		—		4	0
Cercle Brugge	2019–20	First Division A	0	0	0	0	—		—		0	0
Cercle Brugge	2020–21	First Division A	16	0	1	0	—		—		17	0
Cercle Brugge	2021–22	First Division A	20	0	2	0	—		—		22	0
Cercle Brugge	2022–23	First Division A	17	0	2	0	—		—		19	0
Cercle Brugge	2023–24	Pro League	1	0	0	0	—		—		1	0
Cercle Brugge	Total		58	0	5	0	—		—		63	0
Tubize (loan)	2019–20	First Amateur Division	17	0	0	0	—		—		17	0
Zulte Waregem	2023–24	Challenger Pro League	12	2	3	1	—		—		15	3
Royale Union Saint-Gilloise	2024-25	First Amateur Division										
Career total			87	2	8	1	—		—		95	3
