= Johanna Omolo =

Kenyan footballer

Personal information
- Full name: Johanna Ochieng Omolo
- Date of birth: 31 July 1989 (age 37)
- Place of birth: Nairobi, Kenya
- Height: 1.85 m (6 ft 1 in)
- Position: Defensive midfielder

Senior career*
Years	Team	Apps	(Gls)
2006–2007	Coast Stars		
2007–2009	Visé	63	(8)
2009–2011	Fola Esch	46	(8)
2011–2013	Beerschot	5	(0)
2012–2013	→ Lommel United (loan)	19	(0)
2013–2014	Lommel United	19	(0)
2014–2017	Royal Antwerp	77	(5)
2017–2021	Cercle Brugge	69	(4)
2021	BB Erzurumspor	20	(0)
2021–2022	Kocaelispor	14	(0)
2022–2023	URSL Visé	23	(5)
2023–2024	Oostende	7	(0)

International career^{‡}
2011–	Kenya	27	(6)
- * Club domestic league appearances and goals as of 17:33, 21 November 2024 (UTC) ‡ National team caps and goals as of 18 November 2019

Johanna Ochieng Omolo (born 31 July 1989) is a Kenyan professional footballer who last played for the Belgian club Oostende as a defensive midfielder.

== Club career ==
Born in Nairobi, Omolo spent his early career playing for Coast Stars, Visé, Fola Esch, Beerschot, Lommel United and Antwerp. After playing for Cercle Brugge, he signed for Turkish club BB Erzurumspor in January 2021.

On 5 August 2021, Omolo signed a one-year contract with TFF 1. Lig club Kocaelispor on a free transfer. On 25 May 2022, his contract was terminated after Kocaelispor were relegated.

On 4 October 2022, Omolo returned to Belgium, and joined URSL Visé on a free transfer. He made his debut on 23 October 2022, in a 2–1 victory against Francs Borains in a third division match.

On 11 August 2023, Omolo signed a one-year contract with Oostende. Oostende was declared bankrupt in June 2024.

== International career ==
Omolo received his first call-up to the Kenyan national team in September 2010, making his debut for his country in 2011.

Omolo represented the national team at the 2019 Africa Cup of Nations and scored a goal against Tanzania, which helped the team win 3–2, but the result was Kenya could not leave the group.

== Career statistics ==
=== Club ===
As of 21 November 2024

Appearances and goals by club, season and competition
Club	Season	League			Cup		Total	
Club	Season	Division	Apps	Goals	Apps	Goals	Apps	Goals
Fola Esch	2009–10	Luxembourg National Division	25	6	0	0	25	6
Fola Esch	2010–11	Luxembourg National Division	21	2	0	0	21	2
Fola Esch	Total		46	8	0	0	46	8
Beerschot	2011–12	Belgian Pro League	5	0	0	0	5	0
Lommel	2012–13	Challenger Pro League	19	0	0	0	19	0
Lommel	2013–14	Challenger Pro League	19	0	0	0	19	0
Lommel	Total		38	0	0	0	38	0
Antwerp	2014–15	Challenger Pro League	25	2	2	0	27	2
Antwerp	2015–16	Challenger Pro League	27	2	3	0	30	2
Antwerp	2016–17	Challenger Pro League	25	1	1	0	26	1
Antwerp	Total		77	5	6	0	83	5
Cercle Brugge	2017–18	Challenger Pro League	29	1	2	0	31	1
Cercle Brugge	2018–19	Belgian Pro League	18	2	1	0	19	2
Cercle Brugge	2019–20	Belgian Pro League	12	1	0	0	12	1
Cercle Brugge	2020–21	Belgian Pro League	10	0	0	0	10	0
Cercle Brugge	Total		59	4	3	0	62	4
Erzurumspor	2020–21	Süper Lig	20	0	0	0	20	0
Kocaelispor	2021–22	TFF 1. Lig	14	0	2	0	16	0
URSL Visé	2022–23	Belgian Third Division	23	5	0	0	23	5
Oostende	2023–24	Challenger Pro League	7	0	1	0	8	0
Career total			299	22	12	0	311	22

=== International goals ===
Scores and results list Kenya's goal tally first.

No	Date	Venue	Opponent	Score	Result	Competition
1.	18 May 2014	Nyayo National Stadium, Nairobi, Kenya	Comoros	1–0	1–0	2015 Africa Cup of Nations qualification
2.	7 October 2015	Stade George V, Curepipe, Mauritius	Mauritius	1–0	3–2	2018 FIFA World Cup qualification
3.	7 October 2015	Stade George V, Curepipe, Mauritius	Mauritius	4–2	3–2	2018 FIFA World Cup qualification
4.	2 September 2017	Estádio do Zimpeto, Maputo, Mozambique	Mozambique	1–1	1–1	Friendly
5.	27 June 2019	30 June Stadium, Cairo, Egypt	Tanzania	2–2	3–2	2019 Africa Cup of Nations
6.	18 November 2019	Moi International Sports Centre, Nairobi, Kenya	Togo	1–0	1–1	2021 Africa Cup of Nations qualification
