= Kévin Denkey =

Togolese footballer (born 2000)

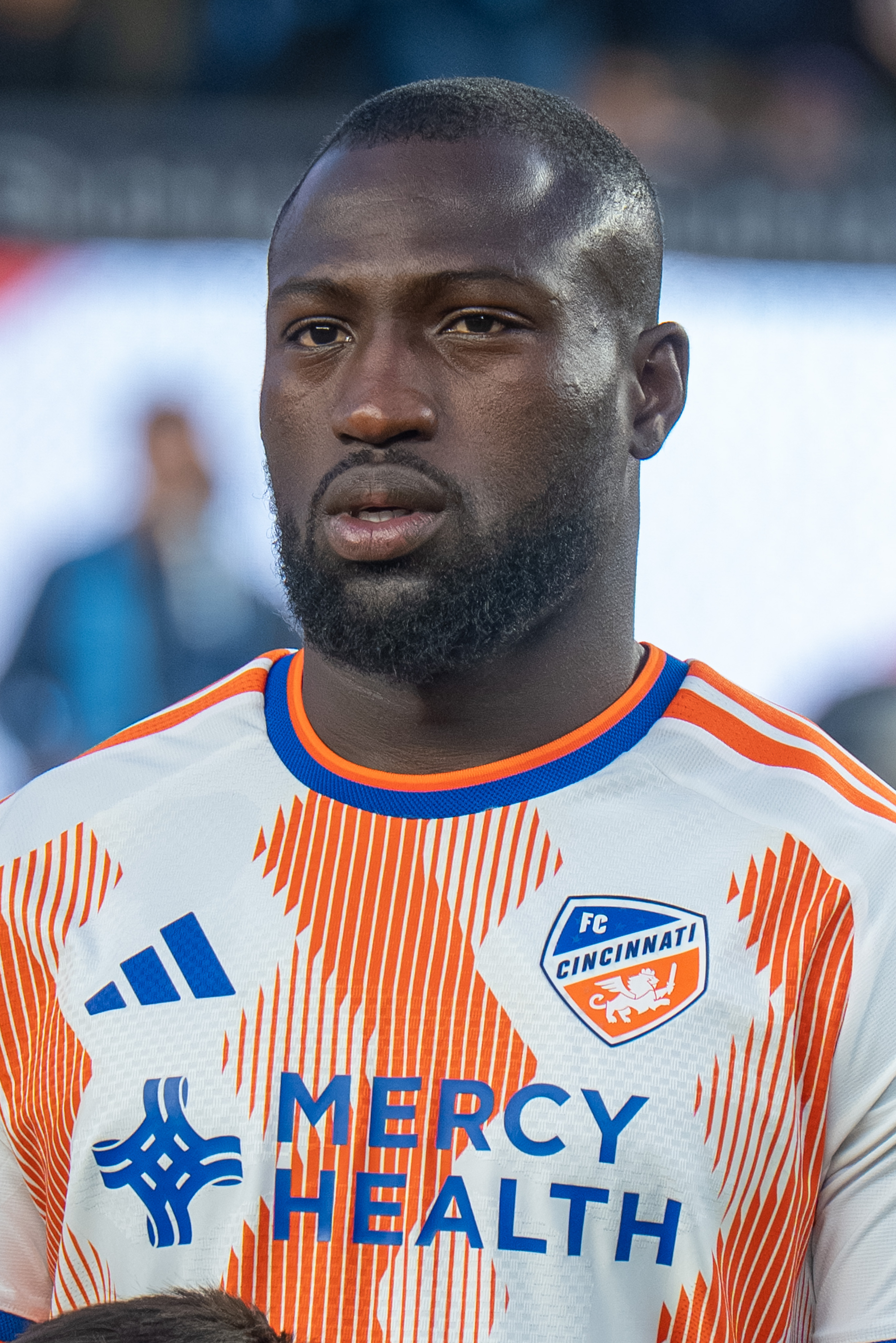
- Denkey with FC Cincinnati in 2026

Personal information
- Full name: Ahoueke Steeve Kévin Denkey
- Date of birth: 30 November 2000 (age 25)
- Place of birth: Lomé, Togo
- Height: 1.81 m (5 ft 11 in)
- Position: Forward

Team information
- Current team: FC Cincinnati
- Number: 9

Youth career
- 2012–2014: Cascol Football
- 2014–2017: Nîmes

Senior career*
Years	Team	Apps	(Gls)
2016–2020	Nîmes II	48	(25)
2017–2021	Nîmes	28	(4)
2019	→ Béziers (loan)	11	(1)
2021–2024	Cercle Brugge	134	(56)
2025–	FC Cincinnati	61	(32)

International career^{‡}
2018	Togo U20	3	(2)
2018–	Togo	52	(14)
- * Club domestic league appearances and goals as of 02:47, 9 November 2026 (UTC) ‡ National team caps and goals as of 17 November 2026

Ahoueke Steeve Kévin Denkey (born 30 November 2000) is a Togolese professional footballer who plays as a forward for Major League Soccer club FC Cincinnati and the Togo national team.

Denkey moved to France at the age of twelve and signed with the youth academy of Nîmes, where he made his professional debut in 2017. He subsequently joined Cercle Brugge in 2021, where he stayed for three years and finished as the top goalscorer of the 2023–24 Belgian Pro League season. He was signed for $16.2 million by FC Cincinnati in November 2024, breaking the transfer record fee for a Major League Soccer club.

== Club career ==
=== Early career ===
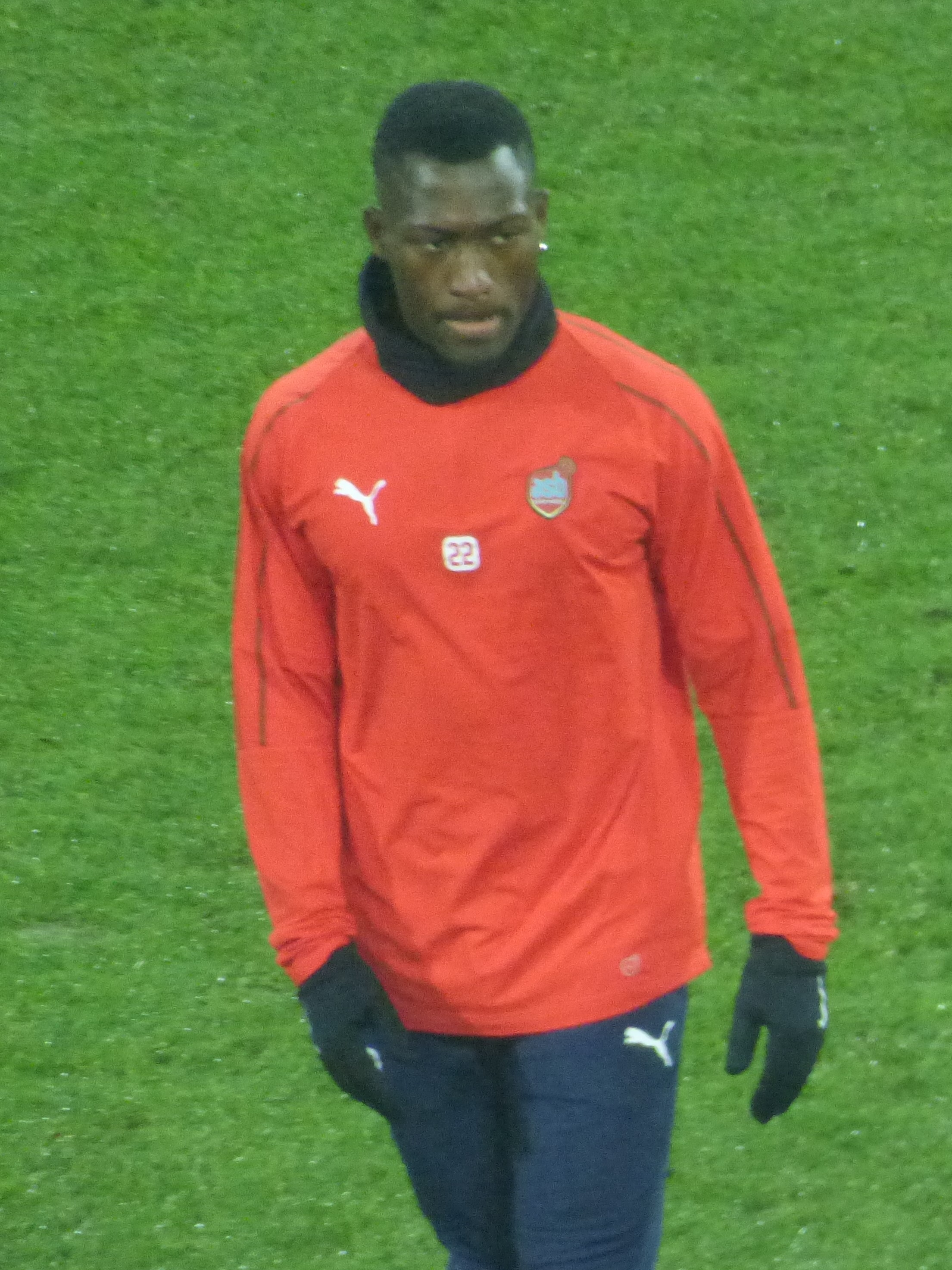
Denkey in training with Béziers in 2019.

Denkey was born in Togo, moving to France at the age of 12 in search of a better education. Denkey briefly stayed with his uncle in Paris before moving to Lyon to live with his aunt.

While in Lyon, he joined Cascol Football under coach Franck Arlabos, playing for the under-14 side at the age of 12. Despite being scouted by Olympique Lyonnais, Denkey moved on his own to the south of France to join the Nîmes youth academy in 2014, still before his 14th birthday.

Due to being left alone at weekends due to his classmates from boarding school returning home for the weekend, Denkey considered returning home to Togo, but persevered. He made his professional debut for Nîmes in a 0–0 Ligue 2 draw with Le Havre on 13 January 2017.

Denkey joined Béziers on a six-month loan in January 2019.

=== Cercle Brugge ===
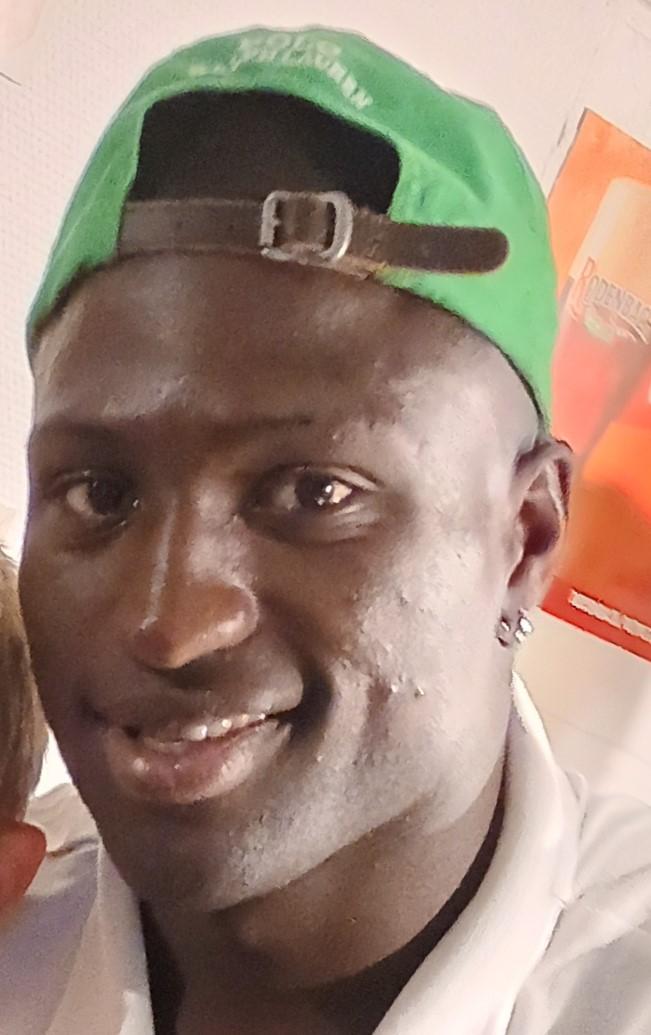
Denkey pictured with a fan during his time at Cercle Brugge in 2024.

On 10 January 2021, Denkey joined Cercle Brugge on a permanent transfer for an undisclosed fee. He signed an initial three and a half year deal.

Playing a support role to Ayase Ueda his first two-and-a-half seasons in Bruges, Denkey scored 23 goals in all competitions during that spell. When Ueda left for Feyenoord in the summer of 2023, Denkey was given the main striker's role by coach Miron Muslic thanks in main to scoring in back-to-back end-of-season games against Gent and Standard Liege in the Belgian Pro League's European play-offs in May 2023.

As the main front man, Denkey scored 11 goals in his first 12 league games of the 2023–24 season for Cercle, including a hat-trick in a 3–2 league win over OH Leuven on 7 October 2023. He finished the 2023–24 season as the Belgian Pro League's top scorer with 27 goals, winning the Golden Bull trophy. In all, Denkey scored 28 goals in all competitions, the highest tally in a single season for the club since Josip Weber in 1993–94.

He also won the Ebony Shoe, awarded to the best footballer of African descent in Belgium's top division. His goals helped the club finish in fourth position in the league, their highest finish since 2008, securing qualification to a UEFA competition for the first time since the 2010–11 season.

Denkey prospered in Europe straight away, scoring a hat-trick against FC St. Gallen in the Conference League on 3 October 2024. He also provided two assists in the match as Cerlce Brugge won 6–2.

Denkey missed Cercle's 5–0 home loss to Anderlecht on 10 November 2024, with the club revealing he was absent due to transfer talks. With Denkey then away on international duty, it was reported on 19 November 2024 that Denkey would join Major League Soccer club FC Cincinnati for a new MLS record of $16.2 million, also an incoming club record for Cercle Brugge.

=== FC Cincinnati ===
On 21 November 2024, Major League Soccer club FC Cincinnati announced they had signed Denkey for a then-MLS record transfer fee of $16.2 million. On 1 January 2025, Denkey officially joined the club as a Designated Player on a three-year deal, with an option for an additional year until 2029. His first goal for the club came in his first appearance in a competitive match, playing away in a 4–1 victory over Honduran club F.C. Motagua in the first round of the 2025 CONCACAF Champions Cup.

== International career ==
Denkey is eligible to represent Togo (through birth) and France (through youth residency). Denkey holds both Togolese and French nationalities. While playing for the Nîmes second team, Denkey was invited to the Togo U20s for the 2018 Toulon Tournament, scoring two goals in three games.

Denkey scored twice in a 2–1 win over South Korea and was approached by Togo senior national team coach Claude Leroy after the game. Leroy committed to follow Denkey's career and to promote Denkey to the Togo first team, with Denkey turning down an approach from the France Under-19 national team as a result.

Three months later and while still 18 years old, Denkey made his debut for the Togo senior national team in a 0–0 2019 Africa Cup of Nations qualification draw with Benin on 9 September 2018. After the match, Denkey was reunited with his family, having not seen them for over five years due to not being in Togo.

== Career statistics ==
=== Club ===
As of match played 7 November 2026

Appearances and goals by club, season and competition
Club	Season	League			National cup (Note: Includes Coupe de France, Belgian Cup)		Continental		Other		Total	
Club	Season	Division	Apps	Goals	Apps	Goals	Apps	Goals	Apps	Goals	Apps	Goals
Nîmes II	2016–17	CFA2	14	7	—		—		—		14	7
Nîmes II	2017–18	CFA2	18	7	—		—		—		18	7
Nîmes II	2018–19	CFA	12	8	—		—		—		12	8
Nîmes II	2019–20	CFA	4	3	—		—		—		4	3
Nîmes II	Total		48	25	—		—		—		48	25
Nîmes	2016–17	Ligue 2	1	0	—		—		—		1	0
Nîmes	2019–20	Ligue 1	17	3	2	0	—		—		19	3
Nîmes	2020–21	Ligue 1	10	1	—		—		—		10	1
Nîmes	Total		28	4	2	0	—		—		30	4
Béziers (loan)	2018–19	Ligue 2	11	1	—		—		—		11	1
Cercle Brugge	2020–21	Belgian Pro League	13	2	3	1	—		—		16	3
Cercle Brugge	2021–22	Belgian Pro League	28	6	1	1	—		—		29	7
Cercle Brugge	2022–23	Belgian Pro League	38	11	2	2	—		—		40	13
Cercle Brugge	2023–24	Belgian Pro League	38	27	1	1	—		—		39	28
Cercle Brugge	2024–25	Belgian Pro League	17	10	1	0	10 (Note: Four appearances in UEFA Europa League, six appearances and five goals in UEFA Conference League)	5	—		28	15
Cercle Brugge	Total		134	56	8	5	10	5	—		152	66
FC Cincinnati	2025	MLS	29	15	—		4 (Note: Appearances in CONCACAF Champions Cup)	2	4 (Note: Appearances in MLS Cup playoffs)	1	37	18
FC Cincinnati	2026	MLS	32	17	—		3	4	3 (Note: Appearances in Leagues Cup)	0	38	21
FC Cincinnati	Total		61	32	—		7	6	7	1	75	39
Career total			282	118	10	5	17	11	7	1	316	135

=== International ===
As of match played 17 November 2026

Appearances and goals by national team and year
National team	Year	Apps	Goals
Togo	2018	4	1
Togo	2019	6	0
Togo	2020	3	0
Togo	2021	5	1
Togo	2022	4	0
Togo	2023	6	5
Togo	2024	10	2
Togo	2025	6	1
Togo	2026	8	4
Total		52	14

Scores and results list Togo's goal tally first, score column indicates score after each Denkey goal.

List of international goals scored by Kévin Denkey
No.	Date	Venue	Opponent	Score	Result	Competition
1	12 October 2018	Stade Général Eyadema, Lomé, Togo	Gambia	1–1	1–1	2019 Africa Cup of Nations qualification
2	12 October 2021	Stade Alphonse Massemba-Débat, Brazzaville, Republic of the Congo	Congo	2–1	2–1	2022 FIFA World Cup qualification
3	14 June 2023	Bidvest Stadium, Johannesburg, South Africa	Lesotho	2–0	2–0	Friendly
4	18 June 2023	Mbombela Stadium, Mbombela, South Africa	Eswatini	1–0	2–0	2023 Africa Cup of Nations qualification
5	10 September 2023	Stade de Kégué, Lomé, Togo	Cape Verde	1–2	3–2	2023 Africa Cup of Nations qualification
6	10 September 2023	Stade de Kégué, Lomé, Togo	Cape Verde	2–2	3–2	2023 Africa Cup of Nations qualification
7	16 November 2023	Martyrs of February Stadium, Benghazi, Libya	Sudan	1–1	1–1	2026 FIFA World Cup qualification
8	6 September 2024	Stade de Kégué, Lomé, Togo	Liberia	1–0	1–1	2025 Africa Cup of Nations qualification
9	17 November 2024	Stade de Kégué, Lomé, Togo	Equatorial Guinea	2–0	3–0	2025 Africa Cup of Nations qualification
10	22 March 2025	Stade de Kégué, Lomé, Togo	Mauritania	2–2	2–2	2026 FIFA World Cup qualification
11	27 March 2026	Moulay El Hassan Stadium, Rabat, Morocco	Guinea	1–0	2–2	Friendly
12	31 March 2026	Père Jégo Stadium, Casablanca, Morocco	Niger	1–0	1–0	Friendly
13	5 June 2026	Moulay El Hassan Stadium, Rabat, Morocco	Central African Republic	1–1	1–1	Friendly
14	9 June 2026	El Bachir Stadium, Mohammedia, Morocco	Benin	4–1	5–1	Friendly

== Honours ==
Individual

- Belgian Pro League top scorer: 2023–24
- Ebony Shoe: 2024
