= Warleson =

Brazilian footballer

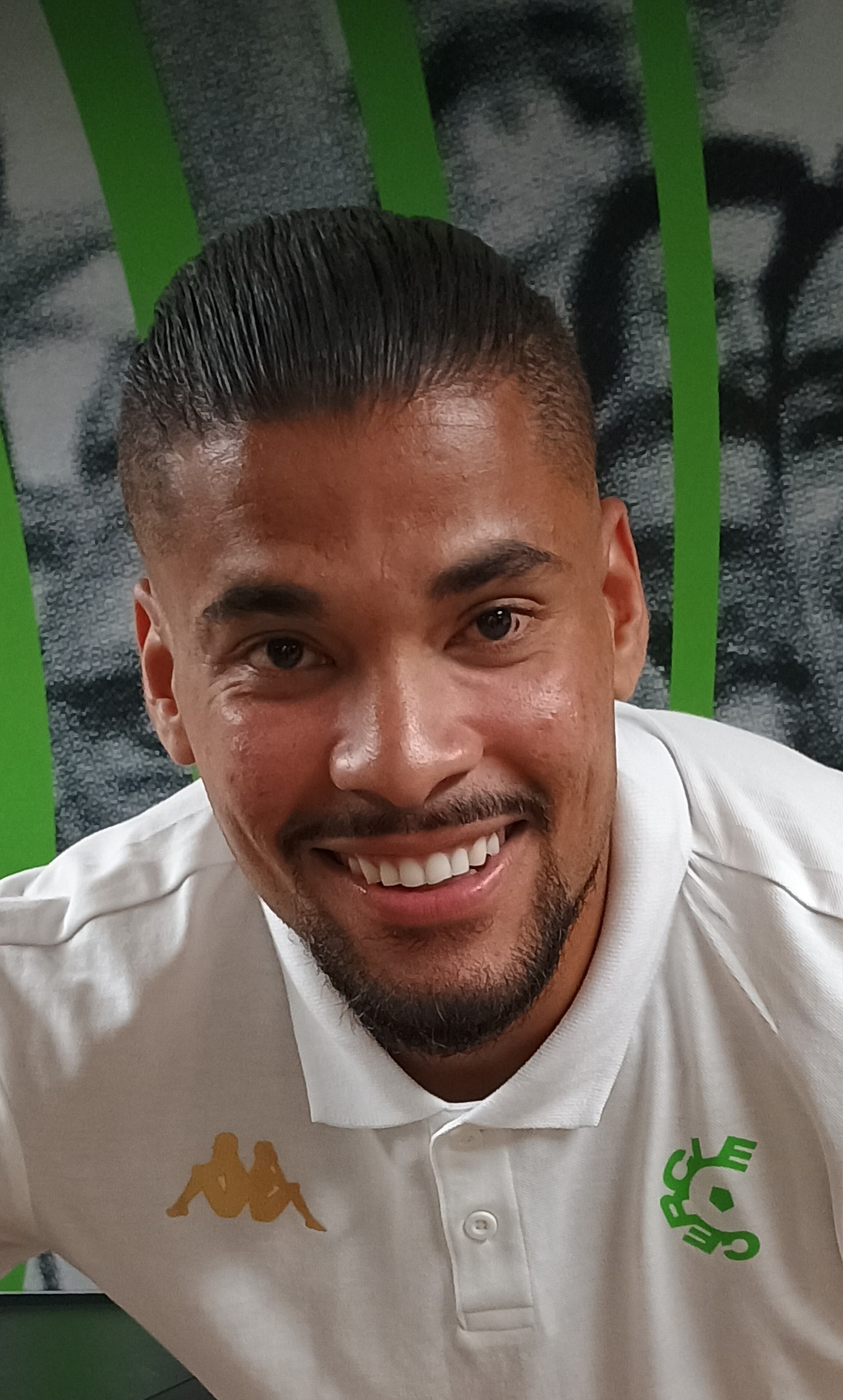
- Warleson in 2024

Personal information
- Full name: Warleson Steillon Lisboa Oliveira
- Date of birth: 31 August 1996 (age 30)
- Place of birth: Cuiabá, Brazil
- Height: 1.91 m (6 ft 3 in)
- Position: Goalkeeper

Team information
- Current team: Botafogo
- Number: 17

Youth career
- –2018: Atlético Paranaense

Senior career*
| Years | Team | Apps | (Gls) |
| 2018 | Atlético Paranaense | 0 | (0) |
| 2018 | → Sampaio Corrêa (loan) | 2 | (0) |
| 2019 | São Joseense | 0 | (0) |
| 2020–2026 | Cercle Brugge | 87 | (0) |
| 2026– | Botafogo | 2 | (0) |
- * Club domestic league appearances and goals as of 27 July 2026

Warleson Steillon Lisboa Oliveira (born 31 August 1996), simply known as Warleson, is a Brazilian footballer who plays as a goalkeeper for Botafogo.

== Career statistics ==
=== Club ===
As of 21 November 2024

| Club | Season | League | | | State League | | Cup | | Continental | | Total | |
| Club | Season | Division | Apps | Goals | Apps | Goals | Apps | Goals | Apps | Goals | Apps | Goals |
|---|---|---|---|---|---|---|---|---|---|---|---|---|
| Atlético Paranaense | 2018 | Série A | 0 | 0 | 0 | 0 | 0 | 0 | — | | 0 | 0 |
| Sampaio Corrêa (loan) | 2018 | Série B | 1 | 0 | 1 (Note: Appearances in Campeonato Maranhense) | 0 | 0 | 0 | — | | 2 | 0 |
| Cercle Brugge | 2019–20 | Jupiler Pro League | 0 | 0 | — | | 0 | 0 | — | | 0 | 0 |
| Cercle Brugge | 2020–21 | Jupiler Pro League | 3 | 0 | — | | 0 | 0 | 0 | 0 | 3 | 0 |
| Cercle Brugge | 2021–22 | Jupiler Pro League | 5 | 0 | — | | 2 | 0 | — | | 7 | 0 |
| Cercle Brugge | 2022–23 | Jupiler Pro League | 7 | 0 | — | | 2 | 0 | — | | 9 | 0 |
| Cercle Brugge | 2023–24 | Jupiler Pro League | 40 | 0 | — | | 0 | 0 | — | | 40 | 0 |
| Cercle Brugge | 2024–25 | Jupiler Pro League | 9 | 0 | — | | 0 | 0 | 6 (Note: Appearances in UEFA Europa League and UEFA Conference League) | 0 | 15 | 0 |
| Cercle Brugge | Total | | 64 | 0 | — | | 4 | 0 | 6 | 0 | 74 | 0 |
| Career total | | | 65 | 0 | 1 | 0 | 4 | 0 | 6 | 0 | 76 | 0 |
