= Vitinho (footballer, born July 1999) =

Brazilian footballer (born 1999)

- Vitinho in 2023

Personal information
- Full name: Victor Alexander da Silva
- Date of birth: 23 July 1999 (age 27)
- Place of birth: Cataguases, Minas Gerais, Brazil
- Height: 1.75 m (5 ft 9 in)
- Positions: Full-back; wing-back

Team information
- Current team: Botafogo
- Number: 2

Youth career
- 2005–2017: Cruzeiro

Senior career*
Years	Team	Apps	(Gls)
2017–2018	Cruzeiro	1	(0)
2018–2022	Cercle Brugge	72	(2)
2022–2024	Burnley	70	(4)
2024–	Botafogo	63	(1)

International career^{‡}
2019	Brazil U20	2	(0)
2025–	Brazil	2	(0)
- * Club domestic league appearances and goals as of 8 April 2026 ‡ National team caps and goals as of 10 October 2025

Victor Alexander da Silva (born 23 July 1999), commonly known as Vitinho (Brazilian Portuguese: [viˈtʃĩɲu]), is a Brazilian professional footballer who plays as a full-back or wing-back for Campeonato Brasileiro Série A club Botafogo and the Brazil national team.

== Club career ==
=== Cruzeiro ===
Vitinho arrived at Cruzeiro when he was six-years-old. In the 2018 U-20 Copa Libertadores, he scored two goals in three matches, and was promoted to the first-team squad.

On 19 May 2018, he made his debut for Cruzeiro, replacing Robinho in the 68th minute against Atlético Mineiro. He was added to the Brazil national team to prepare for the 2018 FIFA World Cup in Russia, but failed to make the final selection.

=== Cercle Brugge ===
On 13 July 2018, he signed a five-year contract with Cercle Brugge.

=== Burnley ===
On 28 July 2022, Vitinho signed for Burnley on a four-year deal. He extended his existing contract the following year signing a four-year extension keeping him at the club until at least the summer of 2027.

=== Botafogo ===
After six seasons in European football, Vitinho agreed to return to Brazilian football in 2024. Botafogo paid €8 million (R$49.6 million at the time) plus €1 million in possible bonuses to acquire him from Burnley. These figures made the player the most expensive defender of the decade in Brazilian football. Vitinho made his debut for Botafogo in the 2–1 victory over Corinthians on September 14, at Nilton Santos, a match valid for the 26th round of the Brazilian Championship.

== International career ==
Shortly after gaining prominence in the 2018 U-20 Copa Libertadores, he was called up to the Brazilian U-20 national team in April of the same year by coach Carlos Amadeu to prepare for the 2019 South American U-20 Championship.

Shortly thereafter, in May, he was called up by coach Tite to join the Brazilian national team for a training camp in England.

On 29 August 2025, Vitinho was again called up to the Brazilian national team. This time, by Italian coach Carlo Ancelotti, to replace the injured Vanderson.

== Career statistics ==
=== Club ===
As of match played 24 August 2024

Appearances and goals by club, season and competition
Club	Season	League			National cup (Note: Includes Belgian Cup, FA Cup)		League cup (Note: Includes EFL Cup)		Other		Total	
Club	Season	Division	Apps	Goals	Apps	Goals	Apps	Goals	Apps	Goals	Apps	Goals
Cruzeiro	2017	Série A	0	0	0	0	—		0	0	0	0
Cruzeiro	2018	Série A	1	0	0	0	—		0	0	1	0
Cruzeiro	Total		1	0	0	0	0	0	0	0	1	0
Cercle Brugge	2018–19	Belgian First Division A	12	0	1	0	—		—		13	0
Cercle Brugge	2019–20	Belgian First Division A	0	0	0	0	—		—		0	0
Cercle Brugge	2020–21	Belgian First Division A	28	1	1	0	—		—		29	1
Cercle Brugge	2021–22	Belgian First Division A	32	1	1	0	—		—		33	1
Cercle Brugge	Total		72	2	3	0	0	0	0	0	75	2
Burnley	2022–23	Championship	35	3	4	0	2	0	—		41	3
Burnley	2023–24	Premier League	32	0	1	0	3	0	—		36	0
Burnley	2024–25	Championship	3	1	0	0	0	0	—		3	1
Burnley	Total		70	4	5	0	5	0	0	0	80	4
Career total			143	6	8	0	5	0	0	0	156	6

== Honours ==
Burnley

- EFL Championship: 2022–23

Botafogo

- Copa Libertadores: 2024
- Campeonato Brasileiro Série A: 2024
