= Charles Vanhoutte =

Belgian footballer (born 1998)

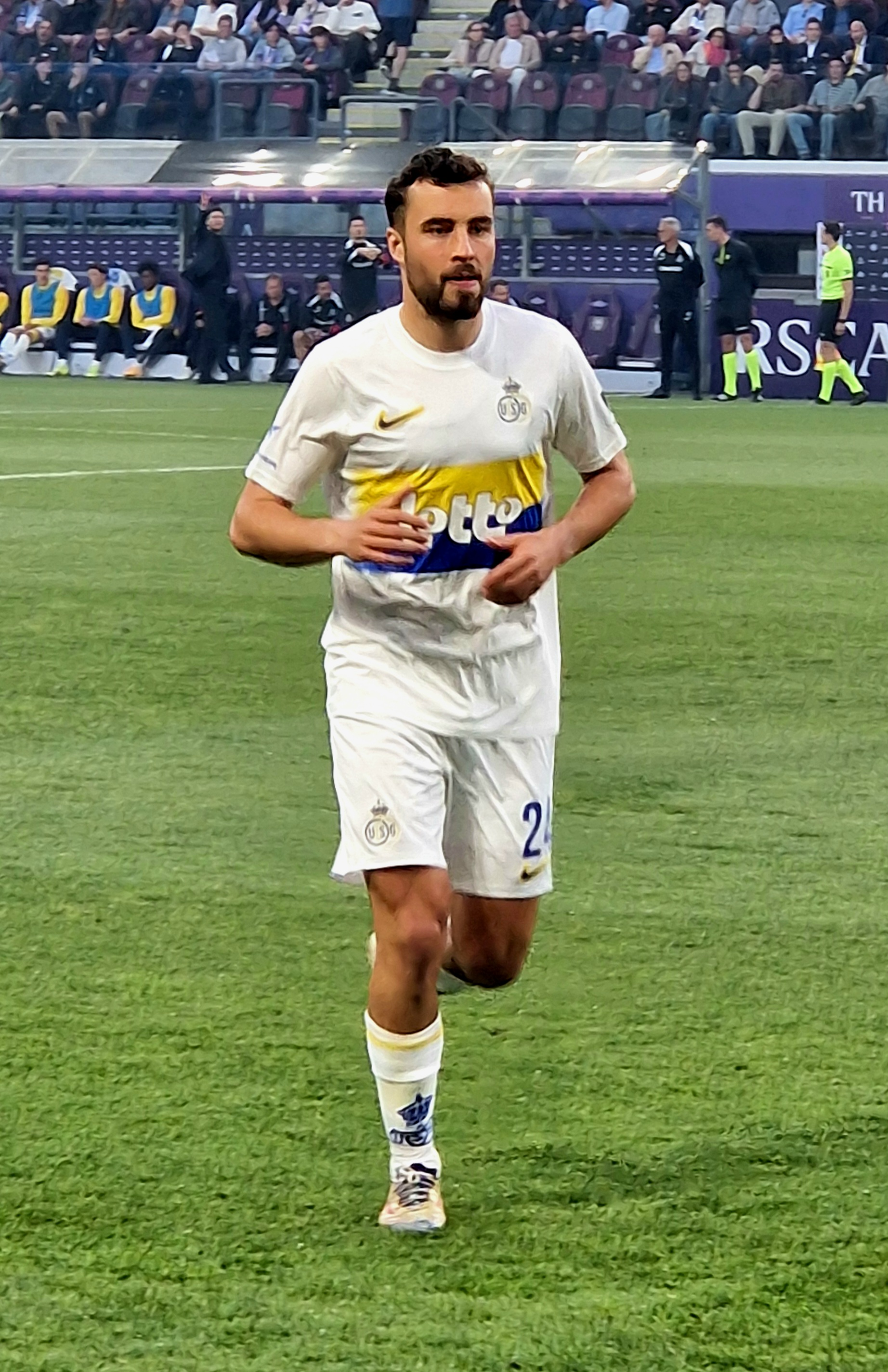
- Vanhoutte playing for Union SG in 2025

Personal information
- Date of birth: 16 September 1998 (age 28)
- Place of birth: Kortrijk, Belgium
- Height: 1.82 m (6 ft 0 in)
- Position: Midfielder

Team information
- Current team: Feyenoord
- Number: 34

Youth career
- 2006–2007: KSC Wielsbeke
- 2007–2009: Zulte Waregem
- 2009–2012: KSC Wielsbeke
- 2012–2018: Cercle Brugge

Senior career*
Years	Team	Apps	(Gls)
2019–2023	Cercle Brugge	93	(2)
2019–2020	→ Tubize (loan)	16	(0)
2023–2025	Union SG	77	(2)
2025–2026	Nice	26	(0)
2026–	Feyenoord	11	(0)

International career^{‡}
2025–	Belgium	1	(0)
- * Club domestic league appearances and goals as of 31 October 2026 ‡ National team caps and goals as of 7 September 2025

Charles Vanhoutte (Dutch pronunciation: [ˈʃɑrlə vɑnˈɦʌutə]; born 16 September 1998) is a Belgian professional footballer who plays as a midfielder for Eredivisie club Feyenoord and the Belgium national team.

== Club career ==
Vanhoutte progressed through the youth teams of KSC Wielsbeke and Zulte Waregem before finally ending up in the youth academy of Cercle Brugge. In July 2018, he was promoted to the first team and signed his first professional contract alongside fellow youth prospect Robbe Decostere.

On 14 May 2019, caretaker manager José Jeunechamps gave Vanhoutte his debut in the Europa League play-offs loss to Royal Excel Mouscron. In the 56th minute, Vanhoutte came onto the pitch to replace Naomichi Ueda. In his first season, he made two appearances in the play-offs.

On 1 September 2019, Vanhoutte was sent on loan to Tubize together with teammate Robbe Decostere on a one-year deal. Vanhoutte played regularly, but was unable to prevent the club from suffering relegation to the Belgian Division 2.

After his loan spell, Vanhoutte became a permanent starter at Cercle Brugge, where he signed a contract extension until June 2023 in December 2020, just like fellow academy players Decostere and Thibo Somers.

On 22 June 2023, Cercle Brugge announced the sale of Vanhoutte to Union Saint-Gilloise.

On 1 September 2025, Vanhoutte signed for Ligue 1 side Nice.

On 19 June 2026, Vanhoutte signed a three-year contract with Eredivisie side Feyenoord.

== International career ==
Vanhoutte was called up to the senior Belgium national team for a set of 2026 FIFA World Cup qualification matches in November 2025.

== Career statistics ==
=== Club ===
As of match played 3 November 2026

Appearances and goals by club, season and competition
Club	Season	League			National cup		Europe		Other		Total	
Club	Season	Division	Apps	Goals	Apps	Goals	Apps	Goals	Apps	Goals	Apps	Goals
Cercle Brugge	2018–19	Belgian Pro League	2	0	0	0	—		—		2	0
Cercle Brugge	2019–20	Belgian Pro League	0	0	0	0	—		—		0	0
Cercle Brugge	2020–21	Belgian Pro League	28	0	2	0	—		—		30	0
Cercle Brugge	2021–22	Belgian Pro League	31	1	2	0	—		—		33	1
Cercle Brugge	2022–23	Belgian Pro League	32	1	1	0	—		—		33	1
Cercle Brugge	Total		93	2	5	0	0	0	0	0	98	2
Tubize (loan)	2019–20	First Amateur Division	16	0	0	0	—		—		16	0
Union SG	2023–24	Belgian Pro League	39	1	5	0	10 (Note: Seven appearances in UEFA Europa League, three appearances in UEFA Conference League)	0	—		54	1
Union SG	2024–25	Belgian Pro League	33	1	2	0	10 (Note: Two appearances in UEFA Champions League, eight appearances in UEFA Europa League)	0	1 (Note: Appearance in Belgian Super Cup)	0	46	1
Union SG	2025–26	Belgian Pro League	5	0	—		—		1	0	6	0
Union SG	Total		77	2	7	0	20	0	2	0	106	2
Nice	2025–26	Ligue 1	26	0	4	0	7 (Note: Appearances in UEFA Europa League)	1	1 (Note: Appearance in Ligue 1 relegation/promotion play-offs)	0	38	1
Feyenoord	2026–27	Eredivisie	11	0	0	0	4 (Note: Appearances in UEFA Champions League)	0	—		15	0
Career total			223	4	16	0	31	1	3	0	273	5

=== International ===
As of match played 7 September 2025

National team	Year	Apps	Goals
Belgium	2025	1	0
Total		1	0

== Honours ==
Union SG

- Belgian Pro League: 2024–25
- Belgian Cup: 2023–24
- Belgian Super Cup: 2024

Nice

- Coupe de France runner-up: 2025–26
