= Kévin Hoggas =

French footballer (born 1991)

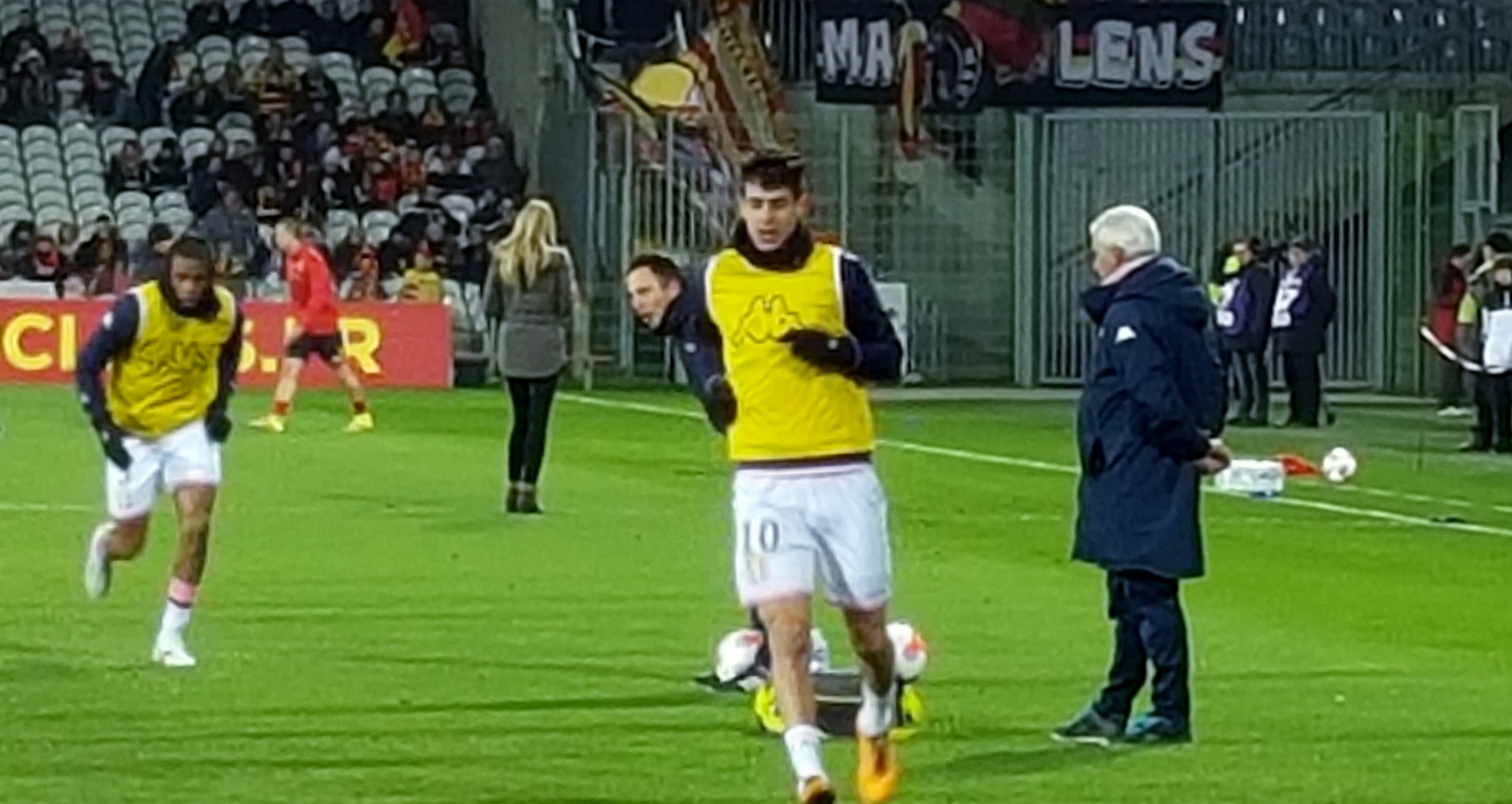
- Hoggas with Évian in 2016

Personal information
- Date of birth: 16 November 1991 (age 34)
- Place of birth: Besançon, France
- Height: 1.83 m (6 ft 0 in)
- Position: Midfielder

Team information
- Current team: Racing Besançon

Youth career
- 1999–2009: Racing Besançon

Senior career*
| Years | Team | Apps | (Gls) |
| 2010–2012 | Racing Besançon | 36 | (1) |
| 2012–2015 | Belfort | 89 | (18) |
| 2015–2016 | Évian | 36 | (7) |
| 2016–2018 | Bourg-en-Bresse | 51 | (5) |
| 2018–2021 | Cercle Brugge | 64 | (7) |
| 2021–2023 | Waasland-Beveren | 52 | (17) |
| 2023–2025 | Sochaux | 43 | (10) |
| 2026– | Racing Besançon | 0 | (0) |
- * Club domestic league appearances and goals as of 31 May 2026

Kévin Hoggas (born 16 November 1991) is a French professional footballer who plays as a midfielder.

== Career ==
In the 2009–10 season, Hoggas was promoted to the first team of his hometown club Racing Besançon after progressing through their youth academy. After the bankruptcy of the club in 2012, he moved to Belfort. Thanks in part to Hoggas' strong performances, the club won promotion to the Championnat National, the third tier in French football, for the first time in their history in 2015. Hoggas, however, went up two divisions: he won a transfer to Ligue 2 club Évian Thonon Gaillard. His time at the club, however, turned out to be a disappointment: Hoggas was a starter in Ligue 2, but the club finished in a relegation spot and were even demoted to one tier lower due to financial problems. However, Hoggas was able to continue playing in Ligue 2 as he was signed by Bourg-en-Bresse.

In January 2018, Hoggas made his first move abroad, signing a three-and-a-half-year contract with Cercle Brugge in the Belgian First Division B. With Cercle, he won promotion to First Division A after a few months. Newly appointed manager Laurent Guyot barely utilised him that season. Under his successors Fabien Mercadal and Bernd Storck, he received more playing time.

On 2 August 2021, Hoggas signed with recently relegated Waasland-Beveren in the second division.

On 21 August 2023, Hoggas signed for Championnat National club Sochaux on a two-year deal.

== Personal life ==
Born in France, Hoggas is of Algerian descent.

== Career statistics ==
As of match played 30 October 2021

Appearances and goals by club, season and competition
| Club | Season | League | | | National Cup | | League Cup | | Other | | Total | |
| Club | Season | Division | Apps | Goals | Apps | Goals | Apps | Goals | Apps | Goals | Apps | Goals |
|---|---|---|---|---|---|---|---|---|---|---|---|---|
| Racing Besançon | 2010–11 | CFA | 15 | 0 | 0 | 0 | — | | — | | 15 | 0 |
| Racing Besançon | 2011–12 | National | 21 | 1 | 0 | 0 | 0 | 0 | — | | 21 | 1 |
| Racing Besançon | Total | | 36 | 1 | 0 | 0 | 0 | 0 | 0 | 0 | 36 | 1 |
| Belfort | 2012–13 | CFA | 31 | 6 | 2 | 0 | — | | — | | 33 | 6 |
| Belfort | 2013–14 | CFA | 29 | 1 | 1 | 0 | — | | — | | 30 | 1 |
| Belfort | 2014–15 | CFA | 29 | 11 | 0 | 0 | — | | — | | 29 | 11 |
| Belfort | Total | | 89 | 18 | 3 | 0 | 0 | 0 | 0 | 0 | 92 | 18 |
| Évian | 2015–16 | Ligue 2 | 36 | 7 | 2 | 0 | 2 | 1 | — | | 40 | 8 |
| Bourg-en-Bresse | 2016–17 | Ligue 2 | 34 | 5 | 0 | 0 | 1 | 0 | — | | 35 | 5 |
| Bourg-en-Bresse | 2017–18 | Ligue 2 | 17 | 0 | 1 | 0 | 1 | 0 | — | | 19 | 0 |
| Bourg-en-Bresse | Total | | 51 | 5 | 1 | 0 | 2 | 0 | 0 | 0 | 54 | 5 |
| Cercle Brugge | 2017–18 | First Division B | 8 | 0 | — | | — | | 0 | 0 | 8 | 0 |
| Cercle Brugge | 2018–19 | First Division A | 6 | 0 | 1 | 0 | — | | — | | 7 | 0 |
| Cercle Brugge | 2019–20 | First Division A | 18 | 6 | 0 | 0 | — | | — | | 8 | 0 |
| Cercle Brugge | 2020–21 | First Division A | 32 | 1 | 1 | 0 | — | | — | | 33 | 1 |
| Cercle Brugge | Total | | 64 | 7 | 2 | 0 | 0 | 0 | 0 | 0 | 66 | 7 |
| Waasland-Beveren | 2021–22 | First Division B | 9 | 3 | 1 | 0 | — | | — | | 10 | 3 |
| Career total | | | 285 | 41 | 9 | 0 | 4 | 1 | 0 | 0 | 298 | 43 |
