= Calvin Dekuyper =

Belgian footballer

Personal information
- Date of birth: 24 February 2000 (age 26)
- Place of birth: Ostend, Belgium
- Height: 1.90 m (6 ft 3 in)
- Position: Midfielder

Team information
- Current team: Eendracht Aalst
- Number: 26

Youth career
- Cercle Brugge

Senior career*
Years	Team	Apps	(Gls)
2019–2021	Cercle Brugge	10	(0)
2021–2022	Mouscron	15	(0)
2022–2023	Mandel United	27	(0)
2023	Eendracht Aalst	2	(0)
2024–2025	Torhout	42	(3)
2025–	Eendracht Aalst	0	(0)
- * Club domestic league appearances and goals as of 18:43, 15 January 2026 (UTC)

Calvin Dekuyper (born 24 February 2000) is a Belgian professional footballer who plays as a midfielder for Eendracht Aalst.

== Career ==
Dekuyper made his Belgian First Division A debut for Cercle Brugge on 26 October 2019 in a game against Genk. On 11 August 2021, he joined Mouscron for one season with an option for a second.
