= David Sousa (footballer, born 2001) =

Brazilian footballer

Personal information
- Full name: David Sousa Albino
- Date of birth: 4 July 2001 (age 25)
- Place of birth: Rio de Janeiro, Brazil
- Height: 1.90 m (6 ft 3 in)
- Position: Centre back

Team information
- Current team: Casa Pia
- Number: 43

Youth career
- Flamengo
- 2015–2020: Botafogo

Senior career*
Years	Team	Apps	(Gls)
2020–2024	Botafogo	22	(1)
2021–2023	→ Cercle Brugge (loan)	18	(1)
2024–2025	RWD Molenbeek	43	(2)
2025–	Casa Pia	27	(2)
- * Club domestic league appearances and goals as of 18 May 2026

David Sousa Albino (born 4 July 2001), known as David Sousa, is a Brazilian footballer who plays as a central defender for Portuguese Primeira Liga club Casa Pia.

== Club career ==
Born in Rio de Janeiro, Sousa joined Botafogo in 2015, after being released by Flamengo. On 18 December 2018, he signed his first professional contract with the club, until July 2022.

Sousa made his first team debut on 18 January 2020, starting in a 0–1 Campeonato Carioca away loss against Volta Redonda. On 8 June, after the departure of Joel Carli, he was definitely promoted to the first team. His Série A debut occurred on 6 September, as he replaced fellow youth graduate Caio Alexandre late into a 2–2 away draw against Corinthians.

On 4 July 2021, Sousa signed a two-year loan deal with Belgian Pro League club Cercle Brugge which included a purchase option.

He missed the entire 2022–23 season due to a severe knee injury sustained on 6 March 2022.

On 15 January 2024, Sousa signed a contract until the end of the season with RWD Molenbeek.

== Career statistics ==
As of 7 November 2020

Club	Season	League			State league		Cup		Continental		Other		Total	
Club	Season	Division	Apps	Goals	Apps	Goals	Apps	Goals	Apps	Goals	Apps	Goals	Apps	Goals
Botafogo	2020	Série A	6	0	2	0	0	0	—		—		8	0
Career total			6	0	2	0	0	0	0	0	0	0	8	0
