= Aske Sampers =

Belgian footballer

Personal information
- Date of birth: 20 May 2001 (age 25)
- Place of birth: Belgium
- Height: 1.84 m (6 ft 0 in)
- Position: Forward

Team information
- Current team: Knokke
- Number: 42

Youth career
- –2021: Cercle Brugge

Senior career*
Years	Team	Apps	(Gls)
2021–2023	Cercle Brugge	9	(0)
2022–2023	Jong Cercle	7	(3)
2023–2025	Lierse	26	(1)
2025–	Knokke	24	(4)
- * Club domestic league appearances and goals as of 3 May 2026

Aske Sampers (born 20 May 2001) is a Belgian professional footballer who plays for Belgian Division 1 club Knokke.

== Club career ==
He made his Belgian First Division A debut for Cercle Brugge on 31 July 2021 in a game against OH Leuven.

On 31 January 2023, Sampers signed with Lierse until June 2025.
