= Boris Popović =

Serbian footballer (born 2000)

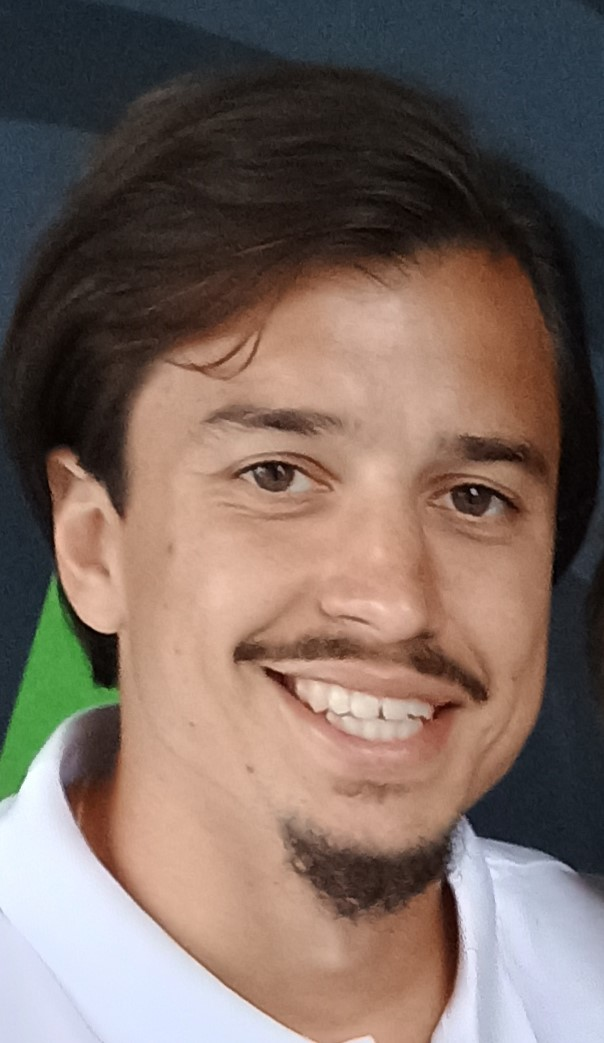
- Boris Popović in 2024

Personal information
- Date of birth: 26 February 2000 (age 26)
- Place of birth: Tours, France
- Height: 1.89 m (6 ft 2 in)
- Position: Centre-back

Team information
- Current team: Arouca
- Number: 5

Youth career
- 2008–2016: Tours

Senior career*
Years	Team	Apps	(Gls)
2016–2017	Tours	6	(0)
2017–2021	Monaco B	7	(0)
2021–2025	Cercle Brugge	97	(4)
2024–2025	→ Arouca (loan)	16	(0)
2025–	Arouca	17	(1)

International career^{‡}
2016–2017	Serbia U17	4	(0)
2018	Serbia U18	2	(0)
2018	Serbia U19	4	(0)
2020–2022	Serbia U21	2	(0)
- * Club domestic league appearances and goals as of 25 May 2026 ‡ National team caps and goals as of 21:17, 17 November 2022 (UTC)

Boris Popović (born 26 February 2000) is a professional footballer who plays as a centre-back for Primeira Liga club Arouca. Born in France, he was a youth international for Serbia.

== Career ==
=== Monaco ===
In 2017, Popović signed for the reserves of French Ligue 1 side Monaco from Tours B in the French fifth division.

=== Cercle Brugge ===
In 2021, he signed with Belgian club Cercle Brugge. On 27 July 2021, he made his debut for Cercle in a 1–0 win over Beerschot, coming on as a substitute for the injured Senna Miangué. On 21 August, he scored his first goal in a 2–1 loss away against Seraing after a poor clearance.

=== Arouca ===
On 2 September 2024, Popović was loaned to Arouca in Portugal for the season. At the end of the season, he joined the Primeira Liga side on a permanent deal, signing a three-year contract.
