= Miguel Van Damme =

Belgian footballer (1993–2022)

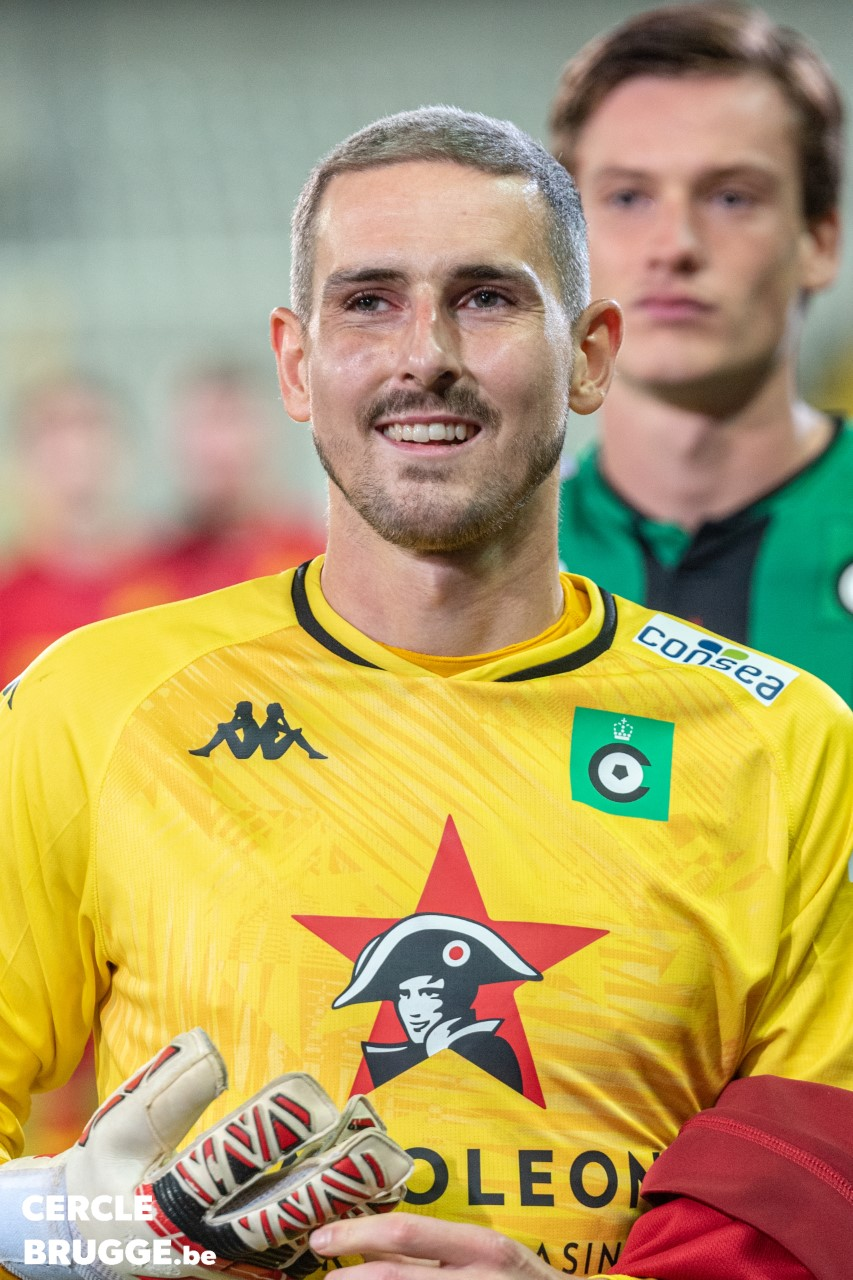

Personal information
- Date of birth: 25 September 1993
- Place of birth: Ghent, Belgium
- Date of death: 29 March 2022 (aged 28)
- Place of death: Belgium
- Height: 1.83 m (6 ft 0 in)
- Position: Goalkeeper

Youth career
- 1999–2003: FC Lembeke
- 2003–2004: KSK Maldegem
- 2004: KSK De Jeugd Lovendegem
- 2004–2013: KSK Maldegem
- 2013–2014: Cercle Brugge

Senior career*
Years	Team	Apps	(Gls)
2014–2022	Cercle Brugge	40	(0)
- * Club domestic league appearances and goals

Miguel Van Damme (25 September 1993 – 29 March 2022) was a Belgian professional footballer who played as a goalkeeper for Cercle Brugge. He came from Cercle's youth team.

== Club career ==
Van Damme made his debut on 5 April 2014 in the Belgian Pro League. He played the full game in a 1–0 home defeat against K.V. Mechelen.

== Honours ==
Belgian second football Division (1): won the Belgian second division during the Season 2017/2018

== Personal life ==
Van Damme was married to Kyana Dobbelaere, and they had one child, born in 2021.

In June 2016, during a routine check-up before the 2016–17 season, Van Damme was diagnosed with leukemia. One year later his cancer was in remission and he signed a new contract with Cercle until June 2019. He recovered and despite still needing medication on a daily basis, he was able to play in the 2017–18 Belgian Cup on 20 September 2017 against Genk. In January 2020 Van Damme relapsed from leukaemia and was informed the chances of survival were low. Despite this, he received immunotherapy, and signed a new one-year contract with Cercle on 16 June 2020. On 18 October 2021, he relapsed again, leaving him to battle leukemia for the fifth time in five years. He eventually succumbed to the disease on 29 March 2022. Cercle Brugge paid tribute to him in a statement: “Miguel, your perseverance and strength to go for it over and over, setback after setback, was admirable. You are an example of positivity, persistence and fighting spirit. A source of inspiration for everyone who fights. Forever in our green-black heart, #16.”
