= Alexander Corryn =

Belgian footballer (born 1994)

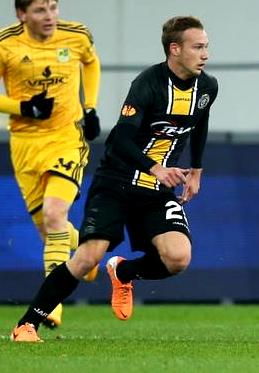

Personal information
- Full name: Alexander Jacques Corryn
- Date of birth: 3 January 1994 (age 32)
- Place of birth: Ghent, Belgium
- Height: 1.77 m (5 ft 10 in)
- Position: Left-back

Team information
- Current team: Hamme

Youth career
- SV Zaffelare
- Lokeren

Senior career*
Years	Team	Apps	(Gls)
2011–2015	Lokeren	22	(0)
2015–2020	Mechelen	34	(0)
2016–2018	→ Antwerp (loan)	47	(1)
2020–2022	Cercle Brugge	26	(0)
2022–2025	Beveren	52	(2)
2025–	Hamme	0	(0)

International career
2012–2013	Belgium U19	10	(0)
- * Club domestic league appearances and goals as of 22 January 2026

Alexander Jacques Corryn (born 3 January 1994) is a Belgian professional footballer who plays as a left back for Hamme.

== Career ==
Corryn joined Challenger Pro League club Beveren on 10 July 2022, signing a one-year contract. He made his debut against Beerschot on 13 August 2022.

== Honours ==
Mechelen

- Belgian Cup: 2018–19
