= Franck Kanouté =

Senegalese footballer

Personal information
- Full name: Elimane Franck Kanouté
- Date of birth: 13 December 1998 (age 27)
- Place of birth: Bignona, Senegal
- Height: 1.86 m (6 ft 1 in)
- Position: Midfielder

Team information
- Current team: Radnički Niš
- Number: 6

Youth career
- 2015–2017: Juventus

Senior career*
Years	Team	Apps	(Gls)
2017–2020	Pescara	17	(0)
2018	→ Ascoli (loan)	14	(0)
2019–2020	→ Cosenza (loan)	18	(0)
2020–2023	Cercle Brugge	22	(2)
2022–2023	→ Sochaux (loan)	30	(1)
2023–2024	Partizan	18	(1)
2025–	Radnički Niš	22	(2)

International career^{‡}
2020–	Senegal	2	(0)
- * Club domestic league appearances and goals as of 13 June 2026 ‡ National team caps and goals as of 14 July 2022

Elimane Franck Kanouté (born 13 December 1998) is a Senegalese professional footballer who plays as a midfielder for Serbian club Radnički Niš.

== Club career ==
Kanouté made his Serie B debut for Pescara on 8 September 2017 in a game against Frosinone. On 1 August 2019, he joined Cosenza on loan until 30 June 2020.

On 1 September 2020, Kanouté joined Cercle Brugge. He signed a contract until 2024. Kanouté scored his first goal for the club on 17 October in a 5–2 win over Gent after an assist from Kylian Hazard.

On 14 July 2022, Kanouté moved to Sochaux in France on loan.

On 19 June 2023, Kanouté signed for Partizan. He became the second Senegalese player to sign for the club after Lamine Diarra.

== International career ==
Kanouté debuted for the Senegal national team in a 1–0 2021 Africa Cup of Nations qualification win over Guinea Bissau on 15 November 2020.
