= Aldom Deuro =

Malian footballer (born 2000)

Personal information
- Full name: Aldom Jean Deuro
- Date of birth: 20 December 2000 (age 25)
- Place of birth: Mali
- Height: 1.78 m (5 ft 10 in)
- Position: Midfielder

Team information
- Current team: Espaly
- Number: 20

Youth career
- 2010–2019: Afrique Football Elite

Senior career*
Years	Team	Apps	(Gls)
2019–2023	Cercle Brugge	2	(0)
2021–2022	→ Châteauroux (loan)	11	(0)
2021–2022	→ Châteauroux II (loan)	12	(0)
2022–2023	Jong Cercle	3	(0)
2024–2025	Riom		
2025–	Espaly		
- * Club domestic league appearances and goals

Aldom Jean Deuro (born 20 December 2000) is a Malian footballer who plays for National 3 club Espaly.

== Career ==
In January 2019, Cercle Brugge signed Deuro from Malian academy Afrique Football Elite. Due to issues with his paperwork, he did not arrive in Bruges until mid-April. On 3 August 2019, Deuro made his official debut for the club in a league match against Oostende, playing the full 90 minutes as Cercle lost 1–3.

In July 2021, Deuro joined French Championnat National club Châteauroux on a one-year loan deal. He made his debut on 6 August in a 2–0 win over Cholet as a 58th-minute substitute for Sofiane Daham.
