= Arne Cassaert =

Belgian footballer (born 2000)

Personal information
- Date of birth: 20 November 2000 (age 25)
- Place of birth: Torhout, Belgium
- Height: 1.86 m (6 ft 1 in)
- Position: Centre-back

Team information
- Current team: Hoogstraten
- Number: 3

Youth career
- 2012–2019: Cercle Brugge

Senior career*
Years	Team	Apps	(Gls)
2019–2023	Cercle Brugge	3	(0)
2022	→ Knokke (loan)	14	(1)
2022–2023	→ Virton (loan)	19	(0)
2023–2025	Lokeren-Temse	39	(0)
2025	Young-Reds Antwerp	13	(1)
2025–	Hoogstraten	0	(0)
- * Club domestic league appearances and goals as of 1 February 2026

Arne Cassaert (born 20 November 2000) is a Belgian professional footballer who plays as a centre-back for Hoogstraten.

== Club career ==
On 20 November 2019, Cassaert signed his first professional contract with Cercle Brugge. Cassaert made his professional debut for Oostende in a 2-1 Belgian First Division A loss to Standard Liège on 1 December 2019.

On 14 January 2022, Cassaert was loaned to Knokke until the end of the season.

On 15 July 2022, Cassaert moved on a new loan to Virton.

On 22 May 2023, 3rd tier club Lokeren-Temse announced the signing of Cassaert on a two-year deal.

On 17 January 2025, Cassaert joined Young-Reds Antwerp.
