= Thibo Somers =

Belgian footballer (born 1999)

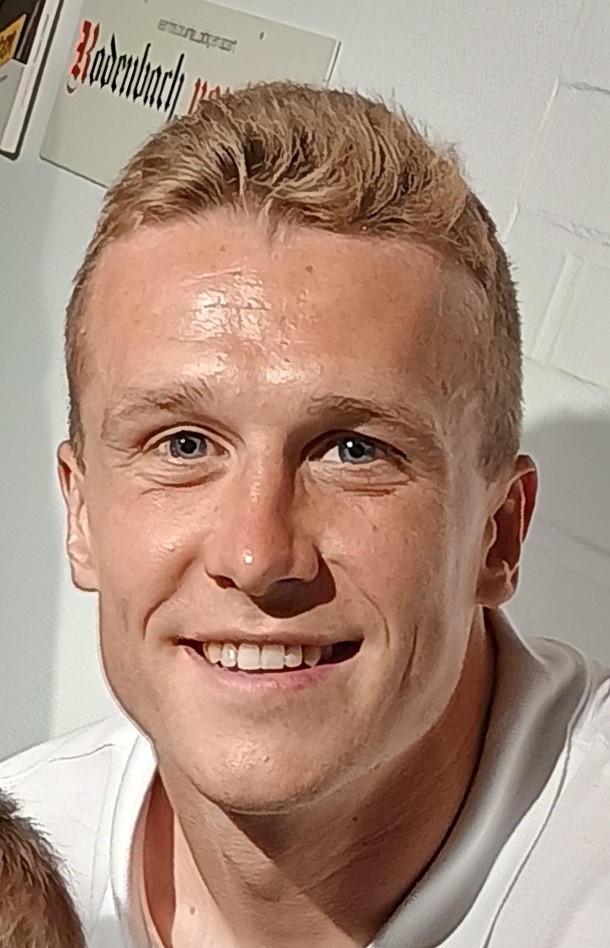
- Thibo Somers in 2024.

Personal information
- Date of birth: 16 March 1999 (age 27)
- Place of birth: Bruges, Belgium
- Height: 1.83 m (6 ft 0 in)
- Position: Midfielder

Team information
- Current team: Antwerp
- Number: 24

Youth career
- Cercle Brugge

Senior career*
Years	Team	Apps	(Gls)
2019–2025	Cercle Brugge	166	(27)
2025–	Antwerp	32	(4)
- * Club domestic league appearances and goals as of 1 June 2026

Thibo Somers (born 16 March 1999) is a Belgian professional footballer who plays as a midfielder for Belgian Pro League club Antwerp.

== Club career ==
He made his Belgian First Division A debut for Cercle Brugge on 26 October 2019 in a game against Genk. Six weeks later, on 7 December 2019 he scored his first goal for Cercle. At the end of the season, he was voted by supporters as the winner of the Pop Poll d'Echte, only with 13 first team appearances at that time in which he started 5 times.

On 18 July 2025, Somers signed a three-season contract with Antwerp.
