= 2021–22 in Belgian football =

Football in Belgium
- Season: 2021–22

Men's football
- First Division A: Club Brugge
- First Division B: Westerlo
- Cup: Gent
- Super Cup: Club Brugge

The following article is a summary of the 2021–22 football season in Belgium, which was the 119th season of competitive football in the country and ran from August 2021 until June 2022.

== Men's football ==
=== League season ===
==== Promotion and relegation ====
The following teams had achieved promotion or suffered relegation going into the 2021–22 season.

League	Promoted to league	Relegated from league
First Division A	Union SG; Seraing	Excel Mouscron; Waasland-Beveren
First Division B	Virton (Note: Virton was not really promoted but reinstated to the First Division B (from Division 2) following legal proceedings related to the club having had its license removed unjustly two seasons prior to that.)	Club NXT (Note: Club NXT did not suffer relegation but instead moved back to the U21 competition. They had been granted a one season permit to play in the First Division B to fill up the gap as there was one team short during the previous season. With Virton reinstated, Club NXT was deemed surplus again.)
National Division 1	none	Roeselare (Note: Roeselare went bankrupt and ceased to exist.)
Division 2	none	none
Division 3	none	none

==== Belgian First Division A ====
===== Regular season =====
Pos	Team	Pld	W	D	L	GF	GA	GD	Pts	Qualification or relegation
1	Union SG	34	24	5	5	78	27	+51	77	Qualification for the Europa Conference League and Play-offs I (Note: The regular season winners will qualify for the 2022–23 UEFA Europa Conference League if they do not qualify for the 2022–23 UEFA Champions League in the playoffs.)
2	Club Brugge (C)	34	21	9	4	72	37	+35	72	Qualification for the Play-offs I
3	Anderlecht	34	18	10	6	72	36	+36	64	Qualification for the Play-offs I
4	Antwerp	34	19	6	9	55	38	+17	63	Qualification for the Play-offs I
5	Gent	34	18	8	8	56	30	+26	62	Qualification for the Play-offs II
6	Charleroi	34	15	9	10	55	46	+9	54	Qualification for the Play-offs II
7	Mechelen	34	15	7	12	57	61	−4	52	Qualification for the Play-offs II
8	Genk	34	15	6	13	66	47	+19	51	Qualification for the Play-offs II
9	Sint-Truiden	34	15	6	13	42	40	+2	51	
10	Cercle Brugge	34	12	9	13	49	46	+3	45	
11	OH Leuven	34	10	11	13	47	58	−11	41	
12	Oostende	34	10	7	17	34	61	−27	37	
13	Kortrijk	34	9	10	15	43	48	−5	37	
14	Standard Liège	34	9	9	16	32	51	−19	36	
15	Eupen	34	8	8	18	37	61	−24	32	
16	Zulte Waregem	34	8	8	18	42	69	−27	32	
17	Seraing (O)	34	8	4	22	30	68	−38	28	Qualification for the Relegation play-off
18	Beerschot (R)	34	4	4	26	33	76	−43	16	Relegation to First Division B

Source: Jupiler Pro League (in Dutch), Soccerway
Rules for classification: 1) Points; 2) Matches won; 3) Goal difference; 4) Goals scored; 5) Away matches won; 6) Away goal difference; 7) Away goals scored; 8) Play-off.
(C) Champions; (O) Play-off winners; (R) Relegated

==== Belgian First Division B ====
Pos	Team	Pld	W	D	L	GF	GA	GD	Pts	Qualification
1	Westerlo (C, P)	28	17	5	6	52	29	+23	56	Promotion to the 2022–23 Belgian First Division A
2	RWDM47	28	14	7	7	41	33	+8	49	Qualification to Promotion play-off
3	Waasland-Beveren	28	12	5	11	47	40	+7	41	
4	Deinze	28	9	12	7	47	39	+8	39	
5	Lierse Kempenzonen	28	9	9	10	39	42	−3	36	
6	Lommel	28	9	8	11	39	40	−1	35	
7	Excel Mouscron (Note: On 13 April 2022, the Belgian FA announced that Excel Mouscron had not been awarded a Belgian professional football license for the coming season, meaning that the club will not be allowed to play in the top two divisions of Belgian football and thus be relegated to the 2022–23 Belgian National Division 1 instead of Virton. One day later, the committee awarding the licenses announced that the club had also not obtained a Belgian remunerated football license, which meant it will be relegated to the 2022–23 Belgian Division 2, where it will start with a three points handicap. The club has announced that it will appeal the decision, as it has done so successfully already no less than six times during the previous seven years. On 10 May 2022, their appeal was rejected and the club's relegation was confirmed. On 31 May 2022, the club announced it would be filing for bankruptcy, as no party was found willing to take over the club. It is in discussion with the ACFF to possibly continue with a team in the provincial leagues (5th level).) (R)	28	8	6	14	31	45	−14	30	Folded as a team
8	Virton	28	5	6	17	24	52	−28	21	

Updated to match(es) played on completed. Source: Belgian First Division B
Rules for classification: 1) Points; 2) Matches won; 3) Goal difference; 4) Goals scored; 5) Away goals scored; 6) Away matches won; 7) Play-off.
(C) Champions; (P) Promoted; (R) Relegated

==== Amateur Leagues ====
===== Belgian National Division 1 =====
Pos	Team	Pld	W	D	L	GF	GA	GD	Pts	Qualification or relegation
1	RFC Liège	28	14	8	6	57	23	+34	50	Qualification for the promotion play-offs
2	Knokke	28	14	6	8	48	33	+15	48	Qualification for the promotion play-offs
3	Dessel	28	13	9	6	47	35	+12	48	Qualification for the promotion play-offs
4	Dender EH	28	12	10	6	41	30	+11	46	Qualification for the promotion play-offs
5	Olympic Charleroi CF	28	12	10	6	41	31	+10	46	
6	Patro Eisden Maasmechelen	28	12	10	6	28	21	+7	46	
7	Sint-Eloois-Winkel	28	12	8	8	40	36	+4	44	
8	Visé	28	11	6	11	45	34	+11	39	
9	Heist	28	10	9	9	41	34	+7	39	
10	Thes Sport	28	10	9	9	35	35	0	39	
11	Tienen	28	9	8	11	28	34	−6	35	
12	Rupel Boom	28	10	3	15	26	39	−13	33	
13	Francs Borains (Note: Due to the fact that Excel Mouscron (playing in the 2021–22 Belgian First Division B) was refused a professional football license and was hence directly relegated to the 2022–23 Belgian Division 2, Francs Borains did not have to take part in the final round to avoid relegation but instead kept its spot in the National Division 1. Mandel United instead took their place, thus getting a chance to avoid relegation instead of facing direct relegation as would have been the case for the 14th place finisher.)	28	8	8	12	26	29	−3	32	
14	Mandel United (O)	28	4	7	17	26	50	−24	19	Qualification for the Division 2 Promotion play-offs Final
15	La Louvière Centre (R)	28	2	3	23	13	78	−65	9	Relegation to Division 2

Source: Soccerway
Rules for classification: 1) Points; 2) Matches won; 3) Goal difference; 4) Goals scored; 5) Away goals scored; 6) Away matches won.
(O) Play-off winners; (R) Relegated
Notes:

Pos	Team	Pld	W	D	L	GF	GA	GD	Pts	Qualification	DEN	RFC	KNO	DES
1	Dender EH (C, P)	6	5	0	1	12	3	+9	38	Promotion to the 2022–23 Belgian First Division B	—	2–0	4–1	1–0
2	RFC Liège	6	4	0	2	12	7	+5	37		1–0	—	2–1	4–0
3	Knokke	6	1	2	3	10	15	−5	29		0–2	2–1	—	3–3
4	Dessel	6	0	2	4	9	18	−9	26		1–3	2–4	3–3	—

Source: Belgian First Amateur Division, Soccerway
Rules for classification: 1) Points; 2) Points without (possible) half points added due to rounding; 3) Matches won; 4) Goal difference; 5) Goals scored; 6) Away goals scored; 7) Away matches won; 8) Play-off.
(C) Champions; (P) Promoted

===== Belgian Division 2 =====
====== Division VFV A ======
Pos	Team	Pld	W	D	L	GF	GA	GD	Pts	Qualification or relegation
1	Petegem (Note: Champions Petegem chose not to apply for a license to play in the Belgian National Division 1 and was not eligible for promotion, they also opted not to participate in the Promotion play-offs VFV (which they could despite not being eligible for promotion).) (C)	30	20	7	3	73	30	+43	67	
2	Ninove (P)	30	18	6	6	69	30	+39	60	Promotion to the 2022–23 Belgian National Division 1
3	Olsa Brakel (Note: Both Brakel, Zelzate and Merelbeke qualified for the Promotion play-offs VFV based on their finishing position (after Petegem dropped out), despite not being eligible for promotion due to not applying for a license for the Belgian National Division 1 level for the coming season)	30	17	7	6	64	38	+26	58	Qualification for the Promotion play-offs VFV
4	Lokeren-Temse	30	17	6	7	45	28	+17	57	Qualification for the Promotion play-offs VFV
5	Zwevezele (Note: Zwevezele opted to drop down to the Belgian Provincial Leagues for the coming season.) (R)	30	16	8	6	62	37	+25	56	Relegation to the Belgian Provincial Leagues
6	Zelzate	30	15	4	11	50	39	+11	49	Qualification for the Promotion play-offs VFV
7	Merelbeke	30	13	6	11	43	43	0	45	Qualification for the Promotion play-offs VFV
8	Gullegem	30	11	8	11	43	46	−3	41	
9	Oudenaarde	30	12	4	14	39	49	−10	40	
10	Harelbeke	30	11	7	12	51	42	+9	40	
11	Gent-Zeehaven	30	12	3	15	42	46	−4	39	
12	Dikkelvenne	30	10	8	12	43	50	−7	38	
13	Westhoek	30	9	4	17	47	62	−15	31	
14	Wetteren (O)	30	6	5	19	34	63	−29	23	Qualification for the Relegation play-offs
15	Menen (Note: Menen will restart at the very bottom level of the Belgian football pyramid.) (R)	30	5	4	21	32	77	−45	19	Restarting at bottom level of pyramid
16	Ronse (Note: Ronse folds as a team, with its matricule being removed from the books. Officially, the club will merge into KVV Ardennen playing in the first provincial division, with the new club name still to be announced.) (R)	30	3	3	24	22	79	−57	12	Folded as a team

Source: vbal4
Rules for classification: 1) Points; 2) Matches won; 3) Goal difference; 4) Goals scored; 5) Away matches won; 6) Goal difference in away matches; 7) Away goals scored.
(C) Champions; (O) Play-off winners; (P) Promoted; (R) Relegated

====== Division VFV B ======
Pos	Team	Pld	W	D	L	GF	GA	GD	Pts	Qualification or relegation
1	Hoogstraten (C, P)	30	22	4	4	72	22	+50	70	Promotion to the 2022–23 Belgian National Division 1
2	Aalst	30	17	6	7	61	35	+26	57	Qualification for the Promotion play-offs VFV
3	Lyra-Lierse	30	17	6	7	52	29	+23	57	Qualification for the Promotion play-offs VFV
4	Cappellen (Note: Cappellen qualified for the Promotion play-offs VFV based on its finishing position, despite not being eligible for promotion due to not applying for a license for the Belgian National Division 1 level for the coming season)	30	16	5	9	53	40	+13	53	Qualification for the Promotion play-offs VFV
5	Belisia	30	15	7	8	44	32	+12	52	Qualification for the Promotion play-offs VFV
6	Bocholt	30	15	6	9	47	38	+9	51	
7	City Pirates	30	13	4	13	44	56	−12	43	
8	Londerzeel	30	10	8	12	36	37	−1	38	
9	Diegem	30	9	8	13	36	45	−9	35	
10	Hasselt	30	10	4	16	38	50	−12	34	
11	Berchem	30	8	9	13	36	45	−9	33	
12	Tongeren	30	8	8	14	37	49	−12	32	
13	Hades	30	7	11	12	34	45	−11	32	
14	Pepingen-Halle	30	7	7	16	34	51	−17	28	Qualification for the Relegation play-offs
15	Houtvenne (R)	30	6	8	16	30	52	−22	26	Relegation to the 2022–23 Belgian Division 3
16	Wijgmaal (R)	30	6	7	17	30	58	−28	25	Relegation to the 2022–23 Belgian Division 3

Updated to match(es) played on completed. Source: vbal4
Rules for classification: 1) Points; 2) Matches won; 3) Goal difference; 4) Goals scored; 5) Away matches won; 6) Goal difference in away matches; 7) Away goals scored.
(C) Champions; (P) Promoted; (R) Relegated

====== Division ACFF ======
Pos	Team	Pld	W	D	L	GF	GA	GD	Pts	Qualification or relegation
1	La Louvière (C, P)	30	26	0	4	75	18	+57	78	Promotion to the 2022–23 Belgian National Division 1
2	Meux (Note: Meux and Warnant qualified for the Promotion play-offs ACFF based on its finishing position, despite not being eligible for promotion due to not applying for a license for the Belgian National Division 1 level for the coming season)	30	19	8	3	73	32	+41	65	Qualification for the Promotion play-offs ACFF
3	Warnant	30	17	10	3	61	24	+37	61	Qualification for the Promotion play-offs ACFF
4	Tubize-Braine	30	17	4	9	63	42	+21	52 (Note: Tubize-Braine were deducted 3 points for licence application inconsistencies in their application of two seasons ago)	Qualification for the Promotion play-offs ACFF
5	Rebecq (Note: Rebecq had applied for a license to be eligible for the Belgian National Division 1 for the coming season, but this was refused after the Promotion play-offs ACFF had already started)	30	14	7	9	53	40	+13	49	Qualification for the Promotion play-offs ACFF
6	Ganshoren	30	14	7	9	46	33	+13	49	
7	Solières	30	13	9	8	74	47	+27	48	
8	Hamoir	30	13	8	9	55	53	+2	47	
9	Acren-Lessines	30	13	3	14	61	61	0	42	
10	Jette	30	10	6	14	37	48	−11	36	
11	Waremme	30	9	4	17	48	58	−10	31	
12	Stockay	30	8	6	16	35	59	−24	30	
13	Verlaine	30	8	5	17	35	53	−18	29	
14	Couvin-Mariembourg (R)	30	6	6	18	31	59	−28	24	Relegation to the 2022–23 Belgian Division 3
15	Givry (R)	30	5	7	18	31	65	−34	22	Relegation to the 2022–23 Belgian Division 3
16	Durbuy (R)	30	2	2	26	16	102	−86	8	Relegation to the 2022–23 Belgian Division 3

Source: vbal4
Rules for classification: 1) Points; 2) Matches won; 3) Goal difference; 4) Goals scored; 5) Away matches won; 6) Goal difference in away matches; 7) Away goals scored.
(C) Champions; (P) Promoted; (R) Relegated

==== Belgian Division 3 ====
===== Division VFV A =====
Pos	Team	Pld	W	D	L	GF	GA	GD	Pts	Qualification or relegation
1	Oostkamp (C, P)	30	23	5	2	83	37	+46	74	Promotion to the 2022–23 Belgian Division 2
2	Lebbeke (P)	30	19	6	5	60	30	+30	63	Qualification for the Promotion play-offs VFV
3	Overijse	30	16	6	8	55	37	+18	54	Qualification for the Promotion play-offs VFV
4	Torhout (O, P)	30	16	6	8	52	45	+7	54	Qualification for the Promotion play-offs VFV
5	Lochristi (Note: Lochristi opted to drop down to the Belgian Provincial Leagues for the coming season due to financial difficulties.) (R)	30	14	6	10	60	47	+13	48	Restarting at bottom level of pyramid
6	Erpe-Mere United (P)	30	13	5	12	45	39	+6	44	Qualification for the Promotion play-offs VFV
7	Hamme	30	12	8	10	49	45	+4	44	
8	Stekene	30	12	6	12	48	38	+10	42	
9	Voorde-Appelterre	30	10	6	14	47	52	−5	36	
10	Wolvertem Merchtem	30	9	9	12	42	39	+3	36	
11	Anzegem	30	10	5	15	47	60	−13	35	
12	Lede	30	10	4	16	47	61	−14	34	
13	Eppegem	30	8	8	14	36	39	−3	32	Qualification for the Relegation play-offs VFV
14	Melsele (R)	30	7	6	17	47	75	−28	27	Relegation to the 2022–23 Belgian Provincial Leagues
15	Sint-Niklaas (R)	30	6	7	17	32	66	−34	25	Relegation to the 2022–23 Belgian Provincial Leagues
16	Rhodienne-De Hoek (R)	30	6	5	19	26	66	−40	23	Relegation to the 2022–23 Belgian Provincial Leagues

Source: vbal4
Rules for classification: 1) Points; 2) Matches won; 3) Goal difference; 4) Goals scored; 5) Away matches won; 6) Goal difference in away matches; 7) Away goals scored.
(C) Champions; (O) Play-off winners; (P) Promoted; (R) Relegated

===== Division VFV B =====
Pos	Team	Pld	W	D	L	GF	GA	GD	Pts	Qualification or relegation
1	Racing Mechelen (C, P)	30	18	5	7	63	41	+22	59	Promotion to the 2022–23 Belgian Division 2
2	Esperanza Pelt	30	18	4	8	64	38	+26	58	Qualification for the Promotion play-offs VFV
3	Diest	30	16	8	6	47	28	+19	56	Qualification for the Promotion play-offs VFV
4	Lille (P)	30	16	6	8	63	55	+8	54	Qualification for the Promotion play-offs VFV
5	Turnhout (P)	30	13	10	7	53	28	+25	49	Qualification for the Promotion play-offs VFV
6	Sint-Lenaarts	30	13	8	9	49	41	+8	47	
7	Zwarte Leeuw	30	13	7	10	61	38	+23	46	
8	Wellen	30	11	11	8	46	41	+5	44	
9	Termien	30	12	6	12	40	41	−1	42	
10	Betekom	30	12	5	13	53	51	+2	41	
11	Nijlen	30	12	5	13	52	55	−3	41	
12	Beringen	30	11	8	11	48	43	+5	41	
13	Witgoor (O)	30	10	5	15	37	43	−6	35	Qualification for the Relegation play-offs VFV
14	De Kempen (R)	30	5	7	18	35	62	−27	22	Relegation to the 2022–23 Belgian Provincial Leagues
15	Berlaar-Heikant (R)	30	4	9	17	27	70	−43	21	Relegation to the 2022–23 Belgian Provincial Leagues
16	Koersel (R)	30	3	2	25	30	93	−63	11	Relegation to the 2022–23 Belgian Provincial Leagues

Source: vbal4
Rules for classification: 1) Points; 2) Matches won; 3) Goal difference; 4) Goals scored; 5) Away matches won; 6) Goal difference in away matches; 7) Away goals scored.
(C) Champions; (O) Play-off winners; (P) Promoted; (R) Relegated

===== Division ACFF A =====
Pos	Team	Pld	W	D	L	GF	GA	GD	Pts	Qualification or relegation
1	Namur FLV (C, P)	28	21	2	5	58	21	+37	65	Promotion to the 2022–23 Belgian Division 2
2	Manageoise	28	14	7	7	61	32	+29	49	Qualification for the Promotion play-offs ACFF
3	Crossing Schaerbeek	28	13	10	5	53	40	+13	49	Qualification for the Promotion play-offs ACFF
4	Aische	28	13	9	6	61	41	+20	48	Qualification for the Promotion play-offs ACFF
5	Tournai	28	13	6	9	38	34	+4	45	
6	Binche (O, P)	28	11	9	8	41	36	+5	42	Qualification for the Promotion play-offs ACFF
7	Symphorinois	28	12	5	11	40	35	+5	41	
8	Tamines	28	10	10	8	32	34	−2	40	
9	Mons	28	9	13	6	55	39	+16	40	
10	Ostiches-Ath	28	10	7	11	41	39	+2	37	
11	Saint-Ghislain	28	9	9	10	39	51	−12	36	
12	CS Braine	28	9	4	15	47	57	−10	31	
13	Gosselies	28	5	7	16	21	50	−29	22	Qualification for the Relegation play-offs ACFF
14	Pont-à-Celles-Buzet (R)	28	2	12	14	20	49	−29	18	Relegation to the 2022–23 Belgian Provincial Leagues
15	Stockel (R)	28	2	4	22	32	81	−49	10	Relegation to the 2022–23 Belgian Provincial Leagues

Source: vbal4
Rules for classification: 1) Points; 2) Matches won; 3) Goal difference; 4) Goals scored; 5) Away matches won; 6) Goal difference in away matches; 7) Away goals scored.
(C) Champions; (O) Play-off winners; (P) Promoted; (R) Relegated

===== Division ACFF B =====
Pos	Team	Pld	W	D	L	GF	GA	GD	Pts	Qualification or relegation
1	Dison (C, P)	30	19	6	5	69	35	+34	63	Promotion to the 2022–23 Belgian Division 2
2	Rochefort	30	18	3	9	63	50	+13	57	Qualification for the Promotion play-offs ACFF
3	Raeren-Eynatten	30	17	2	11	65	51	+14	53	Qualification for the Promotion play-offs ACFF
4	Herstal	30	15	5	10	57	33	+24	50	Qualification for the Promotion play-offs ACFF
5	Sprimont	30	15	5	10	49	40	+9	50	Qualification for the Promotion play-offs ACFF
6	Onhaye	30	14	7	9	50	33	+17	49	
7	Richelle	30	13	5	12	56	48	+8	44	
8	Jodoigne	30	12	5	13	49	44	+5	41	
9	Habay	30	11	8	11	45	44	+1	41	
10	Marloie	30	12	3	15	55	64	−9	39	
11	Mormont	30	10	9	11	50	60	−10	39	
12	Aywaille	30	11	2	17	47	68	−21	35	
13	Huy (O)	30	9	7	14	32	46	−14	34	Qualification for the Relegation play-offs ACFF
14	Oppagne-Wéris (R)	30	8	8	14	39	61	−22	32	Relegation to the 2022–23 Belgian Provincial Leagues
15	Wanze Bas-Oha (R)	30	7	6	17	42	64	−22	27	Relegation to the 2022–23 Belgian Provincial Leagues
16	Gouvy (R)	30	6	5	19	39	66	−27	23	Relegation to the 2022–23 Belgian Provincial Leagues

Source: vbal4
Rules for classification: 1) Points; 2) Matches won; 3) Goal difference; 4) Goals scored; 5) Away matches won; 6) Goal difference in away matches; 7) Away goals scored.
(C) Champions; (O) Play-off winners; (P) Promoted; (R) Relegated

=== Cup competitions ===
Competition	Winner	Score	Runner-up
2021–22 Belgian Cup			
2021 Belgian Super Cup	Club Brugge	3–2	Genk

== UEFA competitions ==
Champions Club Brugge qualified directly for the group stage of the Champions League, while runners-up Genk started in the qualifying rounds where they lost out, causing them to drop into the Europa League. Third-placed Antwerp also played the Europa League after coming through one qualifying round. Fourth and fifth from the previous season, Anderlecht and Gent respectively, had the change to qualify for the 2021–22 UEFA Europa Conference League, but only Gent succeeded, while Anderlecht were eliminated in the last round of qualifying.

Date	Team	Competition	Round	Leg	Opponent	Location	Score	Belgian Team Goalscorers
22 July 2021	Gent	Europa Conference League	Qual. Round 2	Leg 1, Home	(Norway) Vålerenga	Ghelamco Arena, Ghent	4–0	Bruno, Tissoudali, Odjidja-Ofoe, Malede
29 July 2021	Gent	Europa Conference League	Qual. Round 2	Leg 2, Away	(Norway) Vålerenga	Intility Arena, Oslo	2–0	
3 August 2021	Genk	Champions League	Qual. Round 3	Leg 1, Home	(Ukraine) Shakhtar Donetsk	Luminus Arena, Genk	1–2	Onuachu
5 August 2021	Anderlecht	Europa Conference League	Qual. Round 3	Leg 1, Away	(Albania) Laçi	Elbasan Arena, Elbasan	0–3	Delcroix, Hoedt, Refaelov
5 August 2021	Gent	Europa Conference League	Qual. Round 3	Leg 1, Home	(Latvia) RFS	Ghelamco Arena, Ghent	2–2	Oladoye, Tissoudali
10 August 2021	Genk	Champions League	Qual. Round 3	Leg 2, Away	(Ukraine) Shakhtar Donetsk	Olimpiyskyi National Sports Complex, Kyiv	2–1	Dessers
12 August 2021	Anderlecht	Europa Conference League	Qual. Round 3	Leg 2, Home	(Albania) Laçi	Constant Vanden Stock Stadium, Anderlecht	2–1	Amuzu, Verschaeren
12 August 2021	Gent	Europa Conference League	Qual. Round 3	Leg 2, Away	(Latvia) RFS	Slokas Stadium, Jūrmala	0–1	Okumu
19 August 2021	Antwerp	Europa League	Play-off round	Leg 1, Away	(Cyprus) Omonia	GSP Stadium, Nicosia	4–2	Benson, Miyoshi
19 August 2021	Anderlecht	Europa Conference League	Play-off round	Leg 1, Home	(Netherlands) Vitesse	Constant Vanden Stock Stadium, Anderlecht	3–3	Raman (2), Verschaeren
19 August 2021	Gent	Europa Conference League	Play-off round	Leg 1, Away	(Poland) Raków Częstochowa	BBOSIR Stadium, Bielsko-Biała	1–0	
26 August 2021	Antwerp	Europa League	Play-off round	Leg 2, Home	(Cyprus) Omonia	Bosuilstadion, Antwerp	2–0 (aet)(3–2 p)	Miyoshi, Gerkens
26 August 2021	Anderlecht	Europa Conference League	Play-off round	Leg 2, Away	(Netherlands) Vitesse	GelreDome, Arnhem	2–1	Refaelov
26 August 2021	Gent	Europa Conference League	Play-off round	Leg 2, Home	(Poland) Raków Częstochowa	Ghelamco Arena, Ghent	3–0	Tissoudali, Odjidja-Ofoe, De Sart
15 September 2021	Club Brugge	Champions League	Group Stage	Matchday 1, Home	(France) Paris Saint-Germain	Jan Breydel Stadium, Bruges	1–1	Vanaken
16 September 2021	Antwerp	Europa League	Group Stage	Matchday 1, Away	(Greece) Olympiacos	Karaiskakis Stadium, Piraeus	2–1	Samatta
16 September 2021	Genk	Europa League	Group Stage	Matchday 1, Away	(Austria) Rapid Wien	Allianz Stadion, Vienna	0–1	Onuachu
16 September 2021	Gent	Europa Conference League	Group Stage	Matchday 1, Away	(Estonia) Flora	Lilleküla Stadium, Tallinn	0–1	Lemajić
28 September 2021	Club Brugge	Champions League	Group Stage	Matchday 2, Away	(Germany) RB Leipzig	RB Arena, Leipzig	1–2	Vanaken, Rits
30 September 2021	Antwerp	Europa League	Group Stage	Matchday 2, Home	(Germany) Eintracht Frankfurt	Bosuilstadion, Antwerp	0–1	
30 September 2021	Genk	Europa League	Group Stage	Matchday 2, Home	(Croatia) Dinamo Zagreb	Luminus Arena, Genk	0–3	
30 September 2021	Gent	Europa Conference League	Group Stage	Matchday 2, Home	(Cyprus) Anorthosis Famagusta	Ghelamco Arena, Ghent	2–0	Correa (o.g.), Kums
19 October 2021	Club Brugge	Champions League	Group Stage	Matchday 3, Home	(England) Manchester City	Jan Breydel Stadium, Bruges	1–5	Vanaken
21 October 2021	Antwerp	Europa League	Group Stage	Matchday 3, Away	(Turkey) Fenerbahçe	Şükrü Saracoğlu Stadium, Istanbul	2–2	Samatta, Gerkens
21 October 2021	Genk	Europa League	Group Stage	Matchday 3, Away	(England) West Ham United	London Stadium, London	0–3	
21 October 2021	Gent	Europa Conference League	Group Stage	Matchday 3, Away	(Serbia) Partizan	Partizan Stadium, Belgrade	0–1	Kums
3 November 2021	Club Brugge	Champions League	Group Stage	Matchday 4, Away	(England) Manchester City	City of Manchester Stadium, Manchester	4–1	Stones (o.g.)
4 November 2021	Antwerp	Europa League	Group Stage	Matchday 4, Home	(Turkey) Fenerbahçe	Bosuilstadion, Antwerp	0–3	
4 November 2021	Genk	Europa League	Group Stage	Matchday 4, Home	(England) West Ham United	Luminus Arena, Genk	2–2	Paintsil, Souček (o.g.)
4 November 2021	Gent	Europa Conference League	Group Stage	Matchday 4, Home	(Serbia) Partizan	Ghelamco Arena, Ghent	1–1	Tissoudali
24 November 2021	Club Brugge	Champions League	Group Stage	Matchday 5, Home	(Germany) RB Leipzig	Jan Breydel Stadium, Bruges	0–5	
25 November 2021	Antwerp	Europa League	Group Stage	Matchday 5, Away	(Germany) Eintracht Frankfurt	Waldstadion, Frankfurt	2–2	Nainggolan, Samatta
25 November 2021	Genk	Europa League	Group Stage	Matchday 5, Away	(Croatia) Dinamo Zagreb	Stadion Maksimir, Zagreb	1–1	Ugbo
25 November 2021	Gent	Europa Conference League	Group Stage	Matchday 5, Away	(Cyprus) Anorthosis Famagusta	GSP Stadium, Nicosia	1–0	
7 December 2021	Club Brugge	Champions League	Group Stage	Matchday 6, Away	(France) Paris Saint-Germain	Parc des Princes, Paris	4–1	Rits
9 December 2021	Antwerp	Europa League	Group Stage	Matchday 6, Home	(Greece) Olympiacos	Bosuilstadion, Antwerp	1–0	Balikwisha
9 December 2021	Genk	Europa League	Group Stage	Matchday 6, Home	(Austria) Rapid Wien	Luminus Arena, Genk	0–1	
9 December 2021	Gent	Europa Conference League	Group Stage	Matchday 6, Home	(Estonia) Flora	Ghelamco Arena, Ghent	1–0	Bruno
10 March 2022	Gent	Europa Conference League	Round of 16	Leg 1, Away	(Greece) PAOK	Toumba Stadium, Thessaloniki	1–0	
17 March 2022	Gent	Europa Conference League	Round of 16	Leg 2, Home	(Greece) PAOK	Ghelamco Arena, Ghent	1–2	Depoitre

1. Laçi played their home match at Elbasan Arena, Elbasan, instead of their regular stadium Laçi Stadium, Laç, which did not meet UEFA requirements.
2. Shakhtar Donetsk played their home match at NSC Olimpiyskiy, Kyiv, instead of their regular stadium, Donbas Arena in Donetsk, due to the war in Donbas.
3. RFS played their home match at Slokas Stadium, Jūrmala, instead of their regular stadium Stadions Arkādija, Riga, which did not meet UEFA requirements.
4. Raków Częstochowa played their home matches at BBOSiR stadium in Bielsko Biała, instead of their regular stadium Miejski Stadion Piłkarski "Raków", Częstochowa, which did not meet UEFA requirements.
5. Anorthosis Famagusta play their home matches at GSP Stadium, Nicosia, instead of their regular stadium Antonis Papadopoulos Stadium, Larnaca, which did not meet UEFA requirements.

=== European qualification for 2022–23 summary ===
Competition	Qualifiers	Reason for Qualification
UEFA Champions League Group Stage		1st in Belgian First Division A
UEFA Champions League Third Qualifying Round		2nd in Belgian First Division A
UEFA Europa League Play-off round		Belgian Cup winner
UEFA Europa Conference League Third Qualifying Round		3rd in Belgian First Division A
UEFA Europa Conference League Second Qualifying Round		European competition play-offs winner

== Managerial changes ==
This is a list of changes of managers within Belgian professional league football:

=== First Division A ===
Team	Outgoing manager	Manner of departure	Date of vacancy	Position	Replaced by	Date of appointment
Charleroi	(France) Karim Belhocine	Sacked	End of 2020–21 season (Note: Belhocine and Charleroi announced their separation on 20 April 2021, but Belhocine would remain in charge for the remaining training sessions. Charleroi had no more matches left as it had not qualified for any of the play-offs and hence was in no rush to appoint a new manager.)	Pre-season	(Belgium) Edward Still	16 May 2021
Eupen	(Spain) Beñat San José	Left	End of 2020–21 season	Pre-season	(Germany) Stefan Krämer	9 June 2021
Beerschot	(Belgium) Will Still	Replaced	End of 2020–21 season	Pre-season	(Belgium) Peter Maes	20 May 2021
Seraing	(Belgium) Emilio Ferrera	Left for coaching position at Gent	End of 2020–21 season	Pre-season	(Spain) Jordi Condom	28 May 2021
Sint-Truiden	(Belgium) Peter Maes	Replaced by Beerschot	End of 2020–21 season	Pre-season	(Germany) Bernd Hollerbach	5 June 2021
Antwerp	(Belgium) Franky Vercauteren	Replaced by Priske	End of 2020–21 season	Pre-season	(Denmark) Brian Priske	29 May 2021
Beerschot	(Belgium) Peter Maes	Sacked	15 September 2021	18th	(Belgium) Marc Noë (caretaker)	15 September 2021
Beerschot	(Belgium) Marc Noë	Caretaker replaced	21 September 2021	18th	(Argentina) Javier Torrente	21 September 2021
Standard Liège	(Senegal) Mbaye Leye	Sacked	5 October 2021	12th	(Slovenia) Luka Elsner	7 October 2021
Kortrijk	(Slovenia) Luka Elsner	Signed for Standard Liège	7 October 2021	8th	(France) Karim Belhocine	12 October 2021
Cercle Brugge	(Belgium) Yves Vanderhaeghe	Sacked	28 November 2021	17th	(Austria) Dominik Thalhammer	28 November 2021
Genk	(Netherlands) John van den Brom	Sacked	6 December 2021	8th	(Germany) Bernd Storck	7 December 2021
Zulte Waregem	(Belgium) Francky Dury	Sacked	17 December 2021	17th	(Belgium) Davy De fauw & (Belgium) Timmy Simons	17 December 2021
Seraing	(Spain) Jordi Condom	Mutual consent	27 December 2021	17th	(France) Jean-Louis Garcia	3 January 2022
Club Brugge	(Belgium) Philippe Clement	Signed for (France) Monaco	3 January 2022	2nd	(Netherlands) Alfred Schreuder	3 January 2022
Oostende	(Germany) Alexander Blessin	Signed for (Italy) Genoa	19 January 2022	15th	(Germany) Markus Pflanz (caretaker)	19 January 2022
Beerschot	(Argentina) Javier Torrente	Sacked	7 February 2022	18th	(Belgium) Greg Vanderidt (caretaker)	7 February 2022
Oostende	(Germany) Markus Pflanz	Caretaker replaced	11 February 2022	14th	(Belgium) Yves Vanderhaeghe	11 February 2022
Eupen	(Germany) Stefan Krämer	Sacked	16 February 2022	15th	(Australia) Michael Valkanis	16 February 2022

=== First Division B ===
Team	Outgoing manager	Manner of departure	Date of vacancy	Position	Replaced by	Date of appointment
Deinze	(Belgium) Cédric Vlaeminck (caretaker)	Caretaker replaced	End of 2020–21 season	Pre-season	(Belgium) Wim De Decker	4 March 2020 (Note: Wim De Decker was appointed the new manager of Deinze already on 4 March 2020, but would only be observing and analyzing the players for the remainder of the season. Assistant-manager Cédric Vlaeminck will take up the role of manager until the end of the season, leading the training sessions and being on the sideline during matches.)
Westerlo	(Belgium) Bob Peeters	Sacked	End of 2020–21 season	Pre-season	(Belgium) Jonas De Roeck	27 May 2021
Excel Mouscron	(Portugal) Jorge Simão	Hired by (Portugal) Paços Ferreira	End of 2020–21 season	Pre-season	(Belgium) Enzo Scifo	22 June 2021
Waasland-Beveren	(Belgium) Nicky Hayen	Sacked	End of 2020–21 season	Pre-season	(Switzerland) Marc Schneider	18 May 2021
Virton	No manager since end of 2019–20 season			Pre-season	(Belgium) Christophe Grégoire	27 July 2021
Lommel	(England) Liam Manning	Hired by (England) Milton Keynes Dons	11 August 2021	Pre-season	(Netherlands) Peter van der Veen	11 August 2021 (Note: Peter van der Veen was initially appointed caretaker manager at Lommel following the departure of Liam Manning, but took over permanently just one week later.)
Excel Mouscron	(Belgium) Enzo Scifo	Sacked	14 October 2021	8th	(Belgium) Philippe Saint-Jean (caretaker)	14 October 2021
Excel Mouscron	(Belgium) Philippe Saint-Jean	Caretaker replaced	19 October 2021	8th	(Belgium) José Jeunechamps	19 October 2021
Virton	(Belgium) Christophe Grégoire	Sacked	13 December 2021	8th	(France) Emmanuel Coquelet (caretaker)	13 December 2021
Lommel	(Netherlands) Peter van der Veen	Resigned	14 December 2021	7th	(Brazil) Luíz Felipe	14 December 2021 (Note: Luíz Felipe was initially appointed caretaker manager at Lommel following the departure of Peter van der Veen, but was appointed permanent manager one month later.)
Virton	(France) Emmanuel Coquelet	Caretaker replaced	22 December 2021	8th	(Uruguay) Pablo Correa	22 December 2021
Lommel	(Brazil) Luíz Felipe	Mutual Consent	7 February 2022	7th	(Netherlands) Patrick Greveraars (caretaker)	7 February 2022
Lommel	(Netherlands) Patrick Greveraars	Caretaker replaced	16 February 2022	7th	(England) Brian Eastick	16 February 2022
Waasland-Beveren	(Switzerland) Marc Schneider	Sacked	28 February 2022	3rd	(Spain) Jordi Condom	28 February 2022

== See also ==
- 2021–22 Belgian First Division A
- 2021–22 Belgian First Division B
- 2021–22 Belgian National Division 1
- 2021–22 Belgian Division 2
- 2021–22 Belgian Division 3
- 2021–22 Belgian Cup
- 2021 Belgian Super Cup
