= 2021–22 Belgian First Division A =

119th season of top-tier football in Belgium

Belgian First Division A
- Season: 2021–22
- Dates: 23 July 2021 – 22 May 2022
- Champions: Club Brugge
- Relegated: K Beerschot VA
- Champions League: Club Brugge, Union Saint-Gilloise
- Europa League: Gent
- Europa Conference League: Anderlecht, Antwerp
- Matches: 249
- Goals: 733 (2.94 per match)
- Top goalscorer: Deniz Undav (25 goals)
- Biggest home win: Gent 6–1 Club Brugge (29 August 2021); Anderlecht 7–2 Mechelen (12 September 2021); Kortrijk 5–0 Zulte Waregem (19 February 2022)
- Biggest away win: K Beerschot VA 0–7 RSC Anderlecht (27 December 2021)
- Highest scoring: RSC Anderlecht 7–2 KV Mechelen (12 September 2021)
- Longest winning run: 8 matches Club Brugge
- Longest unbeaten run: 13 matches Club Brugge
- Longest winless run: 12 matches Beerschot
- Longest losing run: 7 matches Beerschot
- All statistics correct as of 5 December 2021.

The 2021–22 Belgian Pro League (officially known as Jupiler Pro League due to sponsorship reasons) was the 119th season of top-flight football in Belgium. Club Brugge completed their first league Championship hat-trick since the 1970s by edging out long-time leaders Union Saint-Gilloise, who had led for 200 days until losing twice to Club in the title play-offs. Had Union achieved their unlikely success, they would have been the first newly promoted side to win the Belgian League, and the first to claim a top-20 ranked European league since FC Kaiserslautern's 1997–98 Bundesliga triumph in Germany.

== Team changes ==
On the final matchday of the previous season, Royal Excel Mouscron was overtaken by Waasland-Beveren, pushing them into a direct relegation spot and thus causing the Mouscron team to return to the second level after seven seasons. Waasland-Beveren would eventually face the same fate as a few weeks later they lost the Relegation play-off against Seraing, ending a span of nearly a decade at the top level.

The team from Seraing is a newcomer at the highest level, although a former team with the same name, R.F.C. Seraing (1904), last played at the top level 25 seasons ago and many supporters see the current Seraing as a continuation of the former. The place of Excel Mouscron was taken by 2020–21 Belgian First Division B champions and former Belgian giants Union Saint-Gilloise, returning to the top level after 48 years and already gained 11 Belgian Championship titles, mostly in the 1900s and 1930s.

== Format change ==
Originally, as decided in 2020, the clubs agreed to reduce the number of teams again to 16 following the 2021–22 season, as due to the COVID-19 pandemic exceptionally no teams were relegated from the 2019–20 Belgian First Division A, which causing the league to temporarily expand to 18. This would mean that there would be three teams relegating from the 2021–22 Belgian First Division A with only one team promoted from the 2021–22 Belgian First Division B. However, on 14 June 2021, the clubs agreed to keep playing with 18 teams at the highest level up to (and including) the 2022–23 season, meaning that the 2021–22 Belgian First Division would continue the format of the previous season, with only one team relegating and the penultimate team playing a play-off match against the runner-up of the 2021–22 Belgian First Division B to avoid relegation. The title and Europa League playoffs remain shortened, with only the top four teams playing for the title and number 5 through 8 playing the Europa League playoffs. For the teams finishing in positions 9 through 16, the season ends immediately following the regular season. The request to keep playing with 18 teams at the highest level mainly came from the smaller teams which were already struggling following the financial impact of the COVID-19 pandemic. The bigger clubs agreed to continue the current format but demanded that U23 teams be permanently added to the lower leagues. As such, the intention is that from the 2022–23 season on, there will be 4 U23 teams playing added to each of the second, third and fourth level of Belgian football, with the final standings of the 2021–22 U23 league to determine which team will start at which level.

== Title run-in ==
Returning to top-flight football after 48 years away, Union Saint-Gilloise earned a 3–1 opening-day win away to Brussels' traditional giants Anderlecht, Union hosted reigning champions Club Brugge on 1 August 2021 in their first home game in the top division since 1973, being edged out 1–0 through a late Eduard Sobol winner.

In a difficult January run against all of the previous season's top four, Union beat Anderlecht, Genk and Royal Antwerp, drawing 0–0 away to Club Brugge. By the end of the regular season, Union were top on 77 points, five ahead of Club Brugge, with Antwerp and Anderlecht also qualifying for the six rounds of play-offs, where the quartet would bring forward half of the regular season points into the play-offs. Hence, Union would resume on 39, Club 36, with Anderlecht and Antwerp both on 32.

Union started the play-offs strongly, beating Anderlecht 3–1 and thus becoming the first club ever to inflict three defeats on the Mauves in the same league season. A 0–0 draw away to Antwerp saw the lead over Club Brugge maintained at three points.

The title race swung in the direction of Bruges in back-to-back games between Union and Club, with the champions earning a tight 2–0 win in Brussels to draw level on points, with Club going top under the "half-points" rule, as Union had needed their tally from the regular season rounded-up. Club Brugge won the midweek return 1–0 at the Jan Breydel through an own goal from goalkeeper Anthony Moris to take a three-point lead with two games to go.

Club Brugge clinched the league crown in their next (and penultimate) game against Royal Antwerp, despite Union beating Anderlecht for the fourth time in the season 2–0 at Lotto Park. Eventually, Club finished four points clear of Union SG, 50 points compared to USG's 46, historically qualifying Union for the UEFA Champions League qualifiers. It was the completion of a three-in-a-row for Club Brugge, whose coach Alfred Schreuder would leave within 48 hours of the title success for Ajax.

Union had been top for 200 days.

League glory for Union would have seen them become the first newly promoted side to win a top-20 European national league championship at the first attempt since Kaiserslautern's 1998 Bundesliga success.

Union's runners-up spot qualified them for the UEFA Champions League qualifiers, sending them into European football for the first time since 1964–65, and their first UEFA competition after featuring in five editions of the Fairs Cup in the 1950s and 60s.

== Teams ==
=== Stadiums and locations ===
Locations of the 2021–22 Belgian First Division A teams

Matricule	Club	Location	Venue	Capacity
35	Anderlecht	Anderlecht, Brussels	Constant Vanden Stock Stadium	21,500
1	Antwerp	Antwerp	Bosuilstadion	16,144
13	Beerschot	Antwerp	Olympic Stadium	12,771
12	Cercle Brugge	Bruges	Jan Breydel Stadium	29,042
22	Charleroi	Charleroi	Stade du Pays de Charleroi	14,000
3	Club Brugge	Bruges	Jan Breydel Stadium	29,042
4276	Eupen	Eupen	Kehrwegstadion	8,363
322	Genk	Genk	Luminus Arena	24,956
7	Gent	Ghent	Ghelamco Arena	20,000
19	Kortrijk	Kortrijk	Guldensporen Stadion	9,399
25	Mechelen	Mechelen	AFAS-stadion Achter de Kazerne	16,700
31	Oostende	Ostend	Versluys Arena	8,432
18	Oud-Heverlee Leuven	Leuven	Den Dreef	10,000
167	Seraing	Seraing	Stade du Pairay	8,207
373	Sint-Truiden	Sint-Truiden	Stayen	14,600
16	Standard Liège	Liège	Stade Maurice Dufrasne	30,023
10	Union SG	Saint-Gilles, Brussels	Stade Joseph Marien	8,000
5381	Zulte Waregem	Waregem	Regenboogstadion	12,500

=== Number of teams by provinces ===
Number of teams	Province or region	Team(s)
5	West Flanders	Cercle Brugge, Club Brugge, Kortrijk, Oostende and Zulte Waregem
3	Antwerp	Antwerp, Beerschot and Mechelen
3	Liège	Eupen, Seraing and Standard Liège
2	Brussels	Anderlecht and Union SG
2	Limburg	Genk and Sint-Truiden
1	East Flanders	Gent
1	Flemish Brabant	Oud-Heverlee Leuven
1	Hainaut	Charleroi

=== Personnel and kits ===
Club	Manager	Kit Manufacturer	Sponsors
Anderlecht	(Belgium) Vincent Kompany	Joma	DVV Insurance (home) & Candriam (away)
Antwerp	(Denmark) Brian Priske	Jako	Ghelamco
Beerschot	(Belgium) Greg Vanderidt (caretaker) (Note: Peter Maes was the manager for matchdays 1 through 7, Marc Noë took the honours as caretaker manager on matchday 8, and Javier Torrente was the manager for matchdays 9 until 26.)	XIII (Note: An apparel brand made by club.)	Yelo Rent a Car
Cercle Brugge	(Austria) Dominik Thalhammer (Note: Yves Vanderhaeghe was the manager for matchdays 1 through 16.)	Kappa	Napoleon Games
Charleroi	(Belgium) Edward Still	Kappa	Unibet
Club Brugge	(Netherlands) Alfred Schreuder (Note: Philippe Clement was the manager for matchdays 1 through 21.)	Macron	Unibet
Eupen	(Australia) Michael Valkanis (Note: Stefan Krämer was the manager for matchdays 1 through 27.)	Adidas	Aspire Academy
Genk	(Germany) Bernd Storck (Note: John van den Brom was the manager for matchdays 1 through 17.)	Nike	Beobank
Gent	(Belgium) Hein Vanhaezebrouck	Craft	VDK Bank
Kortrijk	(France) Karim Belhocine (Note: Luka Elsner was the manager for matchdays 1 through 10 before moving to Standard Liège.)	Jako	AGO Jobs & HR
Mechelen	(Belgium) Wouter Vrancken	Erreà	Telenet
OH Leuven	(Belgium) Marc Brys	Adidas	King Power
Oostende	(Belgium) Yves Vanderhaeghe (Note: Alexander Blessin was the manager for matchdays 1 through 21 and Markus Pflanz was caretaker manager for matchdays 22 through 26.)	Kipsta	Casino Oostend
Seraing	(France) Jean-Louis Garcia (Note: Jordi Condom was the manager for matchdays 1 through 21.)	Kappa	Star Casino
Sint-Truiden	(Germany) Bernd Hollerbach	Macron	Nishitan Clinic
Standard Liège	(Slovenia) Luka Elsner (Note: Mbaye Leye was the manager for matchdays 1 through 10.)	Adidas	VOO
Union SG	(Belgium) Felice Mazzù	Le Coq Sportif	Loterie Nationale
Zulte-Waregem	(Belgium) Davy De fauw & (Belgium) Timmy Simons (Note: Francky Dury was the manager for matchdays 1 through 19.)	Patrick	Napoleon Games

=== Managerial changes ===
Team	Outgoing manager	Manner of departure	Date of vacancy	Position	Replaced by	Date of appointment
Charleroi	(France) Karim Belhocine	Sacked	End of 2020–21 season (Note: Belhocine and Charleroi announced their separation on 20 April 2021, but Belhocine would remain in charge for the remaining training sessions. Charleroi had no more matches left as it had not qualified for any of the play-offs and hence was in no rush to appoint a new manager.)	Pre-season	(Belgium) Edward Still	16 May 2021
Eupen	(Spain) Beñat San José	Left	End of 2020–21 season	Pre-season	(Germany) Stefan Krämer	9 June 2021
Beerschot	(Belgium) Will Still	Replaced	End of 2020–21 season	Pre-season	(Belgium) Peter Maes	20 May 2021
Seraing	(Belgium) Emilio Ferrera	Left for coaching position at Gent	End of 2020–21 season	Pre-season	(Spain) Jordi Condom	28 May 2021
Sint-Truiden	(Belgium) Peter Maes	Replaced by Beerschot	End of 2020–21 season	Pre-season	(Germany) Bernd Hollerbach	5 June 2021
Antwerp	(Belgium) Franky Vercauteren	Replaced by Priske	End of 2020–21 season	Pre-season	(Denmark) Brian Priske	29 May 2021
Beerschot	(Belgium) Peter Maes	Sacked	15 September 2021	18th	(Belgium) Marc Noë (caretaker)	15 September 2021
Beerschot	(Belgium) Marc Noë	Caretaker replaced	21 September 2021	18th	(Argentina) Javier Torrente	21 September 2021
Standard Liège	(Senegal) Mbaye Leye	Sacked	5 October 2021	12th	(Slovenia) Luka Elsner	7 October 2021
Kortrijk	(Slovenia) Luka Elsner	Signed for Standard Liège	7 October 2021	8th	(France) Karim Belhocine	12 October 2021
Cercle Brugge	(Belgium) Yves Vanderhaeghe	Sacked	28 November 2021	17th	(Austria) Dominik Thalhammer	28 November 2021
Genk	(Netherlands) John van den Brom	Sacked	6 December 2021	8th	(Germany) Bernd Storck	7 December 2021
Zulte Waregem	(Belgium) Francky Dury	Sacked	17 December 2021	17th	(Belgium) Davy De fauw & (Belgium) Timmy Simons	17 December 2021
Seraing	(Spain) Jordi Condom	Mutual consent	27 December 2021	17th	(France) Jean-Louis Garcia	3 January 2022
Club Brugge	(Belgium) Philippe Clement	Signed for (France) Monaco	3 January 2022	2nd	(Netherlands) Alfred Schreuder	3 January 2022
Oostende	(Germany) Alexander Blessin	Signed for (Italy) Genoa	19 January 2022	15th	(Germany) Markus Pflanz (caretaker)	19 January 2022
Beerschot	(Argentina) Javier Torrente	Sacked	7 February 2022	18th	(Belgium) Greg Vanderidt (caretaker)	7 February 2022
Oostende	(Germany) Markus Pflanz	Caretaker replaced	11 February 2022	14th	(Belgium) Yves Vanderhaeghe	11 February 2022
Eupen	(Germany) Stefan Krämer	Sacked	16 February 2022	15th	(Australia) Michael Valkanis	16 February 2022

== Regular season ==
=== League table ===
Pos	Team	Pld	W	D	L	GF	GA	GD	Pts	Qualification or relegation
1	Union SG	34	24	5	5	78	27	+51	77	Qualification for the Europa Conference League and Play-offs I (Note: The regular season winners will qualify for the 2022–23 UEFA Europa Conference League if they do not qualify for the 2022–23 UEFA Champions League in the playoffs.)
2	Club Brugge (C)	34	21	9	4	72	37	+35	72	Qualification for the Play-offs I
3	Anderlecht	34	18	10	6	72	36	+36	64	Qualification for the Play-offs I
4	Antwerp	34	19	6	9	55	38	+17	63	Qualification for the Play-offs I
5	Gent	34	18	8	8	56	30	+26	62	Qualification for the Play-offs II
6	Charleroi	34	15	9	10	55	46	+9	54	Qualification for the Play-offs II
7	Mechelen	34	15	7	12	57	61	−4	52	Qualification for the Play-offs II
8	Genk	34	15	6	13	66	47	+19	51	Qualification for the Play-offs II
9	Sint-Truiden	34	15	6	13	42	40	+2	51	
10	Cercle Brugge	34	12	9	13	49	46	+3	45	
11	OH Leuven	34	10	11	13	47	58	−11	41	
12	Oostende	34	10	7	17	34	61	−27	37	
13	Kortrijk	34	9	10	15	43	48	−5	37	
14	Standard Liège	34	9	9	16	32	51	−19	36	
15	Eupen	34	8	8	18	37	61	−24	32	
16	Zulte Waregem	34	8	8	18	42	69	−27	32	
17	Seraing (O)	34	8	4	22	30	68	−38	28	Qualification for the Relegation play-off
18	Beerschot (R)	34	4	4	26	33	76	−43	16	Relegation to First Division B

Source: Jupiler Pro League (in Dutch), Soccerway
Rules for classification: 1) Points; 2) Matches won; 3) Goal difference; 4) Goals scored; 5) Away matches won; 6) Away goal difference; 7) Away goals scored; 8) Play-off.
(C) Champions; (O) Play-off winners; (R) Relegated

==== Positions by round ====
The table lists the positions of teams after completion of each round. However, several matches were not completed in the intended timeframe, resulting in the table below showing teams with different number of matches played as from matchday 19:

- The match between Standard Liège and Beerschot of matchday 19 was postponed due to a strike by the police. With the match being cancelled less than three hours prior to the match, Beerschot requested to be given a 0–3 win by forfeit; however the ruling was not in their favour.
- The match between Kortrijk and Antwerp of matchday 21 was postponed due to a large number of players of Antwerp testing positive for COVID-19 one day prior to the match. The match was played between matchdays 25 and 26.
- With Genk missing nine players in January 2022 due to the 2021 Africa Cup of Nations and the CONMEBOL 2022 FIFA World Cup qualifiers, the club was allowed to shift two of its matches. The match between Genk and Mechelen of matchday 24 was shifted forward and was played between matchdays 22 and 23, while the match between Oud-Heverlee Leuven and Genk of matchday 25 was moved backwards to be played between matchdays 26 and 27
- The match between Zulte Waregem and Oostende of matchday 22 was postponed due to a large number of players of Zulte Waregem testing positive for COVID-19 two days prior to the match.
- On 15 January 2022, KV Mechelen decided not to send a team to their away match at OH Leuven, as part of matchday 22. The club "wanted to make a statement", as their earlier request to have the match postponed was declined due to their third goalkeeper not being considered in the number of players testing positive, as he was still under the age of 21. Initially, the disciplinary committee ordered the match to be replayed, as it rules that the rule based on age was discriminatory and hence not legal, eventually however the Belgian Court for Sports Arbitration ruled in favour of OH Leuven on 9 March, awarding them a 5–0 forfeit win.
- Finally, the match between Standard Liège and Charleroi of matchday 17 was abandoned in minute 87 due to home supporter violence, while Charleroi was leading 0–3. Due to the combination of it being almost completed, Charleroi leading strongly and Standard supporters being the cause of the problem, main media outlets were reporting the result as final, already including three points for Charleroi Only on 13 January 2022 it was ruled that the match would not be finished or replayed and that the result would stand.

Team ╲ Round	1	2	3	4	5	6	7	8	9	10	11	12	13	14	15	16	17	18	19	20	21	22	23	24	25	26	27	28	29	30	31	32	33	34
Union SG	2	7	1	1	4	1	2	2	5	3	1	1	1	1	1	1	1	1	1	1	1	1	1	1	1	1	1	1	1	1	1	1	1	1
Club Brugge	7	4	6	3	2	3	1	1	1	4	2	2	2	3	3	3	3	2	2	2	2	2	2	2	2	3	3	2	2	2	2	2	2	2
Anderlecht	16	17	9	6	3	12	7	5	6	7	8	6	6	8	6	6	5	5	4	5	3	4	4	4	4	4	4	4	4	4	3	5	4	3
Antwerp	13	18	13	11	4	15	12	10	3	2	4	3	3	2	2	2	2	3	3	3	4	3	3	3	3	2	2	3	3	3	4	3	3	4
Gent	14	14	17	12	14	11	15	16	13	14	12	9	10	10	7	7	6	6	6	6	6	5	5	5	6	6	5	5	5	5	5	4	5	5
Charleroi	1	2	4	8	9	7	4	8	12	11	9	7	5	5	5	5	4	4	5	4	5	6	6	6	5	5	6	7	7	7	7	6	7	6
Mechelen	4	8	14	15	10	13	16	12	9	6	5	5	4	4	4	4	7	7	7	8	7	7	7	9	7	7	7	6	6	6	6	7	6	7
Genk	9	13	10	5	6	4	5	3	4	5	6	10	7	6	8	10	8	11	9	9	9	8	9	10	10	8	8	8	8	8	8	8	8	8
Sint-Truiden	5	6	11	13	16	14	9	11	8	9	11	12	13	11	10	11	11	12	13	15	13	13	11	11	11	12	11	10	10	10	10	9	9	9
Cercle Brugge	6	5	7	10	12	16	13	14	16	17	17	17	17	17	17	17	17	16	12	14	11	10	10	7	8	9	10	9	9	9	9	10	10	10
OH Leuven	11	12	16	17	17	17	17	17	17	16	16	15	14	14	14	13	14	14	15	13	10	11	13	13	14	11	9	12	12	12	11	11	11	11
Oostende	18	10	3	2	6	8	11	9	10	10	7	11	11	12	13	15	12	13	14	11	14	15	15	15	13	14	14	13	13	14	14	14	14	12
Kortrijk	3	1	2	9	5	5	8	6	7	8	10	8	9	9	11	9	10	9	8	7	8	9	8	8	9	10	12	11	11	11	12	12	12	13
Standard Liège	12	3	12	7	3	6	3	7	11	12	13	13	12	13	12	12	13	10	11	12	15	14	14	12	12	13	13	14	14	13	13	13	13	14
Eupen	8	11	5	4	1	2	6	4	2	1	3	4	8	7	9	8	9	8	10	10	12	12	12	14	15	15	15	15	16	15	16	15	15	15
Zulte Waregem	10	16	8	14	13	10	14	15	15	15	15	14	15	15	16	16	16	17	17	16	16	16	16	16	16	16	16	16	15	16	15	16	16	16
Seraing	17	9	15	16	11	9	10	13	14	13	14	16	16	16	15	14	15	15	16	17	17	17	17	17	17	17	17	17	17	17	17	17	17	17
Beerschot	15	15	18	18	18	18	18	18	18	18	18	18	18	18	18	18	18	18	18	18	18	18	18	18	18	18	18	18	18	18	18	18	18	18

Source: worldfootball.net

=== Results ===
Home \ Away	USG	CLU	AND	ANT	GNT	CHA	KVM	GNK	STR	CER	OHL	OOS	KVK	STA	EUP	ZWA	SER	BEE
Union SG	—	0–1	1–0	1–2	0–0	4–0	2–0	2–1	0–1	3–2	1–3	1–1	2–0	4–0	0–0	2–1	4–2	5–0 (Note: The match between Union SG and Beerschot was stopped with 82 minutes played at 0–0, after supporters from the away team were throwing objects (including pyrotechnics) on the pitch and some of them had climbed over the barriers to start fighting with home supporters. On 16 April, the disciplinary board of professional football rules that Union SG was to win the match by a forfeit score of 5–0, as it was obvious that fans of the away team were responsible for the irregularities leading to the prematurely ended match.)
Club Brugge	0–0	—	2–2	4–1	1–2	2–0	2–0	3–1	2–0	1–1	1–1	3–0	2–0	2–2	2–2	3–0	3–2	3–2
Anderlecht	1–3	1–1	—	2–1	1–1	4–0	7–2	2–0	2–0	0–2	2–2	3–0	1–1	1–1	4–1	3–2	3–0	4–2
Antwerp	0–2	1–1	2–0	—	1–0	3–0	1–2	4–2	1–1	1–1	2–2	3–0	0–1	2–3	4–2	1–0	2–1	2–1
Gent	0–2	6–1	1–0	0–1	—	2–3	2–0	1–0	2–1	2–1	5–0	1–1	2–2	3–1	2–0	2–1	4–0	2–2
Charleroi	0–3	0–1	1–3	1–1	0–0	—	0–2	2–0	0–0	5–0	0–3	1–0	1–1	0–0	3–0	3–0	2–0	5–2
Mechelen	3–1	2–1	0–1	3–2	4–3	2–2	—	1–1	0–1	2–2	2–0	3–0	3–2	3–1	1–3	2–2	2–0	3–2
Genk	1–1	2–3	1–0	1–1	0–3	4–2	4–1	—	0–1	1–1	4–0	3–4	2–0	2–0	5–0	2–0	3–0	4–1
Sint-Truiden	1–2	1–2	2–2	2–1	2–1	0–1	1–1	1–2	—	1–2	2–0	1–1	0–2	3–0	2–0	1–3	3–1	3–2
Cercle Brugge	0–3	2–0	1–2	0–1	2–2	1–2	3–1	2–2	0–1	—	1–1	0–1	2–0	1–1	1–2	3–1	2–0	2–0
OH Leuven	1–4	1–4	0–0	0–1	0–1	1–1	5–0 (Note: KV Mechelen decided not to send a team to their away match at OH Leuven and thus the match was not played. The club "wanted to make a statement" as their earlier request to have the match postponed was declined due to their third goalkeeper not being considered in the number of players testing positive, as he was still under the age of 21. Mechelen did not agree and simply decided not to show up. Since these were the agreed upon rules (by all clubs), which Mechelen did not adhere to, the rules stipulate that Mechelen would lose the match by a forfeit score of 5–0. The disciplinary board for professional football however decided early February 2022 that the rule violated the Social equality rules due to discriminating on age, ordering the match to be replayed. OH Leuven appealed this decision however with the Belgian Arbitrage Court for Sports, which in the end ruled in its favour, awarding the team a 5–0 forfeit win.)	2–1	4–1	3–2	—	1–0	2–1	2–1	1–4	1–1	1–3	0–0
Oostende	1–7	1–3	2–2	1–2	1–0	0–3	2–4	0–4	0–0	2–1	1–3	—	0–2	1–0	2–1	0–2	2–2	3–1
Kortrijk	2–3	0–1	2–3	0–2	1–0	2–2	2–2	1–2	1–3	0–2	2–1	1–0	—	0–1	1–1	5–0	2–0	1–1
Standard Liège	1–3	2–2	0–1	2–5	0–1	0–3	1–2	1–1	1–2	1–1	2–2	1–0	1–1	—	1–0	0–1	0–1	1–0
Eupen	2–3	1–3	1–1	0–1	0–1	0–4	1–1	3–2	2–1	0–2	3–1	0–2	2–2	0–2	—	1–1	1–2	1–0
Zulte Waregem	0–2	0–4	1–2	2–1	1–2	2–2	3–2	2–6	0–2	2–4	1–1	0–0	2–2	1–2	3–0	—	1–0	2–0
Seraing	0–4 (Note: Originally started on 15 January 2022, the match was stopped at half-time with Union SG leading 0–2, due to a very dense fog over the field reducing visibility. The second half was played a few days later, on 18 January 2022.)	0–5	0–5	0–1	0–0	1–3	1–0	0–2	2–0	2–1	1–1	2–3	0–2	0–1	0–0	5–1	—	2–1
Beerschot	0–3	1–3	0–7	0–1	0–2	2–3	0–1	2–0	0–1	0–1	3–1	0–2	2–1	0–1	0–3	3–3	3–0	—

Source: Jupiler Pro League (in Dutch), Soccerway
Legend: Blue = home team win; Yellow = draw; Red = away team win.

== Play-offs ==
=== Play-off I ===
Points obtained during the regular season were halved (and rounded up) before the start of the playoff. Union SG started with 39 points, Club Brugge 36 points, Anderlecht and Antwerp 32 points each. As the points of Union SG and Antwerp were rounded up, in case of ties they would always be ranked below the team (or teams) they are tied with. The deciding factor after that would be finishing position in the regular season.

Pos	Team	Pld	W	D	L	GF	GA	GD	Pts	Qualification or relegation	CLU	USG	AND	ANT
1	Club Brugge (C)	6	4	2	0	8	2	+6	50	Qualification for the Champions League group stage	—	1–0	1–1	1–0
2	Union SG	6	2	1	3	5	5	0	46	Qualification for the Champions League third qualifying round	0–2	—	3–1	0–1
3	Anderlecht	6	2	2	2	8	7	+1	40	Qualification for the Europa Conference League third qualifying round	0–0	0–2	—	2–1
4	Antwerp	6	1	1	4	3	10	−7	36	Qualification for the Europa Conference League second qualifying round	1–3	0–0	0–4	—

Source: Jupiler Pro League (in Dutch), Soccerway
Legend: Blue = home team win; Yellow = draw; Red = away team win.
Rules for classification: 1) Points; 2) Points without (possible) half points added due to rounding; 3) Regular season finishing position.
(C) Champions

=== Play-off II ===
Points obtained during the regular season were halved (and rounded up) before the start of the playoff. Gent started with 31 points, Charleroi with 27 points, and both Mechelen and Genk with 26 points each. The points of Genk were rounded up, and hence in case of ties they will always be ranked below the team (or teams) they are tied with.

The winner of Play-Off II was originally scheduled to play the fourth-placed team of Play-Off I to determine which team would qualify for the second qualifying round of the 2022–23 UEFA Europa Conference League. However, since Gent won both the 2021–22 Belgian Cup (thus already qualifying for the 2022–23 UEFA Europa League) and Play-off II, the fourth-placed team of Play-Off I qualified automatically for the Europa Conference League and the European play-off was not contested.

Pos	Team	Pld	W	D	L	GF	GA	GD	Pts	Qualification or relegation	GNT	GNK	CHA	MEC
1	Gent	6	4	0	2	9	5	+4	43	Qualification for the Europa League play-off round (Note: Gent qualified for the Europa League play-off round as the 2021–22 Belgian Cup winners.)	—	0–1	1–2	1–0
2	Genk	6	3	2	1	10	8	+2	37		0–2	—	3–2	4–2
3	Charleroi	6	2	1	3	10	12	−2	34		1–3	2–2	—	3–2
4	Mechelen	6	1	1	4	6	10	−4	30		1–2	0–0	1–0	—

Source: Jupiler Pro League (in Dutch), Soccerway
Legend: Blue = home team win; Yellow = draw; Red = away team win.
Rules for classification: 1) Points; 2) Points without (possible) half points added due to rounding; 3) Regular season finishing position.

== Promotion-Relegation play-off ==
The team finishing in 17th place competes in a two-legged match with the runner-up of the 2021–22 Belgian First Division B, with the aggregate winner to play in the 2022–23 Belgian First Division A, while the losing team will take part in the 2022–23 Belgian First Division B.

On 2 April 2021, following a draw away to Oostende, Seraing was certain of finishing 17th and forced to play the relegation play-off against a team from the Belgian First Division B. Seraing had won promotion last season by winning the 2020–21 Promotion-Relegation play-off and will now be looking to avoid going down again the same way. One day later in the 2021–22 Belgian First Division B, RWDM lost their match away to Deinze, meaning they would finish second and thus play Seraing for promotion.

23 April 2022
18:30 CEST

RWD Molenbeek	0–1	Seraing
	Report	Mikautadze 45'

Edmond Machtens Stadium, Molenbeek-Saint-Jean
Attendance: 10,000
Referee: Bram Van Driessche
30 April 2022
20:45 CEST

Seraing	0–0	RWD Molenbeek
	Report

Stade du Pairay, Seraing
Attendance: 7,200
Referee: Jonathan Lardot

Seraing won 1–0 on aggregate
Seraing remains in Belgian First Division A. RWD Molenbeek remains in Belgian First Division B.

== Season statistics ==
As of 10 April 2022

=== Top scorers and assists ===
The official statistics were calculated after the play-offs.

Top scorers ranking
Rank	Player	Club	Goals
1	(Germany) Deniz Undav	Union SG	26
2	(Switzerland) Michael Frey	Antwerp	24
3	(Morocco) Tarik Tissoudali	Gent	21
3	(Nigeria) Paul Onuachu	Genk	21
5	(Belgium) Jelle Vossen	Zulte Waregem	17
6	(Netherlands) Joshua Zirkzee	Anderlecht	16
7	(Belgium) Nikola Storm	Mechelen	15
8	(Belgium) Charles De Ketelaere	Club Brugge	14
8	(Belgium) Dante Vanzeir	Union SG	14
10	(Belgium) Hugo Cuypers	Mechelen	13
10	(Jamaica) Shamar Nicholson	Charleroi	13
10	(Guinea-Bissau) Zinho Gano	Zulte Waregem	13
10	(Comoros) Faïz Selemani	Kortrijk	13

Assists ranking
Rank	Player	Club	Assists
1	(Japan) Junya Ito	Genk	16
2	(France) Xavier Mercier	OH Leuven	14
4	(Netherlands) Noa Lang	Club Brugge	12
4	(France) Jean-Luc Dompé	Zulte Waregem	12
4	(Germany) Deniz Undav	Union SG	12
4	(Japan) Ryota Morioka	Charleroi	12
7	(Spain) Sergio Gómez	Anderlecht	11
8	(Bosnia and Herzegovina) Dino Hotić	Cercle Brugge	10
8	(Belgium) Dante Vanzeir	Union SG	10
8	(Belgium) Hugo Cuypers	Mechelen	10

== Awards ==
Award	Winner	Club
Player of the Year	(Germany) Deniz Undav	Union SG
Manager of the Year	(Belgium) Felice Mazzù	Union SG
Youngster of the Year	(Belgium) Charles De Ketelaere	Club Brugge
Referee of the Year	(Belgium) Erik Lambrechts	
Goal of the Year	(Japan) Junya Ito	Genk
Lifetime Achievement Award	(Belgium) Pierre Denier	Genk
Football & Community Award		Genk & Waasland-Beveren
Groundsmen Award		OH Leuven

Team of the Season
Goalkeeper	(Belgium) Simon Mignolet (Club Brugge)			
Defence	(Angola) Clinton Mata (Club Brugge)	(Belgium) Brandon Mechele (Club Brugge)	(Cameroon) Michael Ngadeu (Gent)	(Spain) Sergio Gómez (Anderlecht)
Midfield	(Georgia (country)) Teddy Teuma (Union Saint-Gilloise)	(Denmark) Casper Nielsen (Union Saint-Gilloise)	(Belgium) Hans Vanaken (Club Brugge)	(Belgium) Charles De Ketelaere (Club Brugge)
Attack	(Germany) Deniz Undav (Union Saint-Gilloise)		(Morocco) Tarik Tissoudali (Gent)	
