= 2020–21 Belgian First Division A =

118th season of top-tier football in Belgium

Belgian First Division A
- Season: 2020–21
- Dates: 8 August 2020 – 23 May 2021
- Champions: Club Brugge
- Relegated: Excel Mouscron; Waasland-Beveren
- Champions League: Club Brugge; Genk
- Europa League: Royal Antwerp
- Europa Conference League: Gent; Anderlecht
- Matches: 306
- Goals: 914 (2.99 per match)
- Top goalscorer: Paul Onuachu (30 goals)
- Biggest home win: Gent 5–1 Beerschot (4 October 2020); Genk 4–0 Eupen (30 October 2020); Gent 4–0 Excel Mouscron (15 February 2021); Gent 4–0 Charleroi (10 April 2021); Genk 4–0 Sint-Truiden (11 April 2021)
- Biggest away win: Zulte Waregem 0–6 Club Brugge (20 September 2020)
- Highest scoring: Kortrijk 5–5 Beerschot (7 November 2020)
- Longest winning run: 10 matches Club Brugge
- Longest unbeaten run: 12 matches Club Brugge
- Longest winless run: 10 matches Cercle Brugge; Excel Mouscron; Waasland-Beveren
- Longest losing run: 7 matches Cercle Brugge
- All statistics correct as of 20 May 2021.

The 2020–21 Belgian First Division A was the 118th season of top-tier football in Belgium. As part of a proposal by the Jupiler Pro League's board of directors accepted by the General Assembly on 15 May 2020, the 2020–21 season would involve shortened playoffs due to the COVID-19 pandemic. Only the top four teams would play for the title, while teams five through eight would play for the remaining ticket into Europe. The league fixtures were announced on 8 July 2020. Club Brugge successfully defended their title from the previous season, finishing level on points in the title play-offs with Racing Genk, as regular season runners-up Royal Antwerp's challenge faded.

== Team changes ==
Waasland-Beveren were originally relegated to the Belgian First Division B, as they were the bottom-placed team when the 2019–20 Belgian First Division A stopped prematurely due to the COVID-19 pandemic. However, following legal proceedings, they remained in the top-flight, and instead, the league was expanded to 18 teams, with both OH Leuven and Beerschot being promoted (normally only one of them would have gained promotion). Technically, under its current form and owners, Beerschot will make its debut in the top tier of Belgian football, although in reality two teams with the same identity have played at the top level: Beerschot VAC (81 seasons, last in 1990–91) and Beerschot AC (until its bankruptcy at the end of the 2012–13 season, and known as Germinal Beerschot from 1999 until 2011). OH Leuven returned to the top tier after an absence of four seasons, when they dropped to the last place on the ultimate matchday of the 2015–16 season.

== Format change ==
With now 18 instead of 16 teams, the format has changed somewhat. While the season still starts with an initial round-robin phase in which all teams play each other twice, the end of season play-offs have been shortened temporarily and for the 2020–21 and 2021–22 seasons only. The title playoffs will now only be played by the top four teams (instead of six) and the Europa play-offs will now be played by the teams finishing fifth through eight (instead of all teams finishing below 6th). As a result, for all teams finishing below 8th, the season will be over upon completion of the round-robin phase, with the team in last position being relegated. One exception is the team finishing in 17th position, as this team will play a promotion-relegation play off against the 2nd-place finisher in the 2020–21 Belgian First Division B, with the winner playing in the 2021–22 Belgian First Division A.

== Teams ==
=== Stadiums and locations ===
Locations of the 2020–21 Belgian First Division A teams

Matricule	Club	Location	Venue	Capacity
35	Anderlecht	Anderlecht	Constant Vanden Stock Stadium	21,500
1	Antwerp	Antwerp	Bosuilstadion	12,975
13	Beerschot	Antwerp	Olympic Stadium	12,771
12	Cercle Brugge	Bruges	Jan Breydel Stadium	29,042
22	Charleroi	Charleroi	Stade du Pays de Charleroi	14,000
3	Club Brugge	Bruges	Jan Breydel Stadium	29,042
4276	Eupen	Eupen	Kehrwegstadion	8,363
322	Genk	Genk	Luminus Arena	24,956
7	Gent	Ghent	Ghelamco Arena	20,000
19	Kortrijk	Kortrijk	Guldensporen Stadion	9,399
25	Mechelen	Mechelen	AFAS-stadion Achter de Kazerne	16,700
216	Mouscron	Mouscron	Stade Le Canonnier	10,571
31	Oostende	Ostend	Versluys Arena	8,432
18	Oud-Heverlee Leuven	Leuven	Den Dreef	10,000
373	Sint-Truiden	Sint-Truiden	Stayen	14,600
16	Standard Liège	Liège	Stade Maurice Dufrasne	30,023
4068	Waasland-Beveren	Beveren	Freethiel Stadion	8,190
5381	Zulte Waregem	Waregem	Regenboogstadion	12,500

=== Number of teams by provinces ===
Number of teams	Province or region	Team(s)
5	West Flanders	Cercle Brugge, Club Brugge, Kortrijk, Oostende and Zulte Waregem
3	Antwerp	Antwerp, Beerschot and Mechelen
2	East Flanders	Gent and Waasland-Beveren
2	Hainaut	Charleroi and Mouscron
2	Liège	Eupen and Standard Liège
2	Limburg	Genk and Sint-Truiden
1	Brussels	Anderlecht
1	Flemish Brabant	Oud-Heverlee Leuven

=== Personnel and kits ===
Club	Manager	Kit Manufacturer	Sponsors
Anderlecht	(Belgium) Vincent Kompany (Note: During the first two matchdays, Kompany & Franky Vercauteren were co-managing the squad, with Kompany also registered as player (though not playing through injury). However thereafter Kompany stopped his playing career and became the sole manager of the squad.)	Joma	DVV Insurance (home); Candriam (away)
Antwerp	(Belgium) Franky Vercauteren (Note: Ivan Leko was the manager for matchdays 1 through 19.)	Jako	Ghelamco
Beerschot	(Belgium) Will Still (Note: Hernán Losada was the manager for matchdays 1 through 21.)	XIII (Note: An apparel brand made by club.)	Yelo
Cercle Brugge	(Belgium) Yves Vanderhaeghe (Note: Paul Clement was the manager for matchdays 1 through 25.)	Kappa	Napoleon Games
Charleroi	(France) Karim Belhocine (Note: Karim Belhocine was the manager for all matches of the regular season, after which he was sacked but remained manager until the last training session of the season. Note that Charleroi had not qualified for the play-offs and hence had no more matches scheduled.)	Kappa	Lotto
Club Brugge	(Belgium) Philippe Clement	Macron	Unibet
Eupen	(Spain) Beñat San José	Adidas	Qatar Airways
Excel Mouscron	(Portugal) Jorge Simão (Note: Fernando Da Cruz was managing the team for matchdays 1 to 9.)	Uhlsport	Star Casino
Genk	(Netherlands) John van den Brom (Note: Hannes Wolf was manager for matchdays 1 to 4, Domenico Olivieri was caretaker manager on matchdays 5 and 12; and Jess Thorup managed the club from matchdays 6 through 11.)	Nike	Beobank
Gent	(Belgium) Hein Vanhaezebrouck (Note: Jess Thorup was the manager for matchdays 1 and 2, László Bölöni led the club for matchdays 3 through 5 and Wim De Decker was in charge on matchdays 6 through 14.)	Craft	VDK Bank
Kortrijk	(Slovenia) Luka Elsner (Note: Yves Vanderhaeghe was the manager for matchdays 1 through 25.)	Jako	AGO Jobs & HR
Mechelen	(Belgium) Wouter Vrancken	Jartazi	Telenet
OH Leuven	(Belgium) Marc Brys	Adidas	King Power
Oostende	(Germany) Alexander Blessin	Kipsta	Star Casino
Sint-Truiden	(Belgium) Peter Maes (Note: Kevin Muscat was the manager for matchdays 1 through 14 and Stef Van Winckel was caretaker manager on matchday 15.)	Macron	DMM.com
Standard Liège	(Senegal) Mbaye Leye (Note: Philippe Montanier was the manager for matchdays 1 through 19.)	New Balance	VOO
Waasland-Beveren	(Belgium) Nicky Hayen	Uhlsport	Star Casino
Zulte-Waregem	(Belgium) Francky Dury	Patrick	Napoleon Games

=== Managerial changes ===
Team	Outgoing manager	Manner of departure	Date of vacancy	Position	Replaced by	Date of appointment
Cercle Brugge	(Germany) Bernd Storck	End of contract	End of 2019–20 season	Pre-season	(England) Paul Clement	3 July 2020
Antwerp	(Romania) László Bölöni	End of contract	End of 2019–20 season	Pre-season	(Croatia) Ivan Leko	20 May 2020
Sint-Truiden	(Slovenia) Miloš Kostić	Mutual consent	End of 2019–20 season	Pre-season	(Australia) Kevin Muscat	2 June 2020
Waasland-Beveren	(Belgium) Dirk Geeraerd (caretaker)	Caretaker replaced	End of 2019–20 season	Pre-season	(Belgium) Nicky Hayen	4 June 2020
Oostende	(Bosnia and Herzegovina) Adnan Čustović	Replaced	End of 2019–20 season	Pre-season	(Germany) Alexander Blessin	7 June 2020
Standard Liège	(Belgium) Michel Preud'homme	Resigned	End of 2019–20 season	Pre-season	(France) Philippe Montanier	10 June 2020
Excel Mouscron	(Germany) Bernd Hollerbach	Mutual consent	End of 2019–20 season	Pre-season	(France) Fernando Da Cruz	18 July 2020
Anderlecht	(Belgium) Franky Vercauteren	Kompany became sole manager	17 August 2020	3rd	(Belgium) Vincent Kompany	17 August 2020
Gent	(Denmark) Jess Thorup	Sacked	20 August 2020	16th	(Romania) László Bölöni	20 August 2020
Gent	(Romania) László Bölöni	Sacked	14 September 2020	16th	(Belgium) Wim De Decker	14 September 2020
Genk	(Germany) Hannes Wolf	Sacked	15 September 2020	14th	(Belgium) Domenico Olivieri (caretaker)	15 September 2020
Genk	(Belgium) Domenico Olivieri	Caretaker replaced	24 September 2020	14th	(Denmark) Jess Thorup	24 September 2020
Excel Mouscron	(France) Fernando Da Cruz	Sacked	19 October 2020	18th	(Portugal) Jorge Simão	20 October 2020
Genk	(Denmark) Jess Thorup	Hired by (Denmark) Copenhagen	2 November 2020	7th	(Netherlands) John van den Brom	8 November 2020 (Note: While van den Brom was announced on 6 November 2020, caretaker Domenico Olivieri was still leading the group during the match of 7 November 2020 against Sint-Truiden, with van den Brom only officially taking charge of 8 November 2020.)
Sint-Truiden	(Australia) Kevin Muscat	Sacked	1 December 2020	16th	(Belgium) Stef Van Winckel (caretaker)	1 December 2020
Gent	(Belgium) Wim De Decker	Sacked	3 December 2020	12th	(Belgium) Hein Vanhaezebrouck	4 December 2020
Sint-Truiden	(Belgium) Stef Van Winckel	Caretaker replaced	7 December 2020	17th	(Belgium) Peter Maes	7 December 2020
Standard Liège	(France) Philippe Montanier	Sacked	26 December 2020	11th	(Senegal) Mbaye Leye	30 December 2020
Antwerp	(Croatia) Ivan Leko	Hired by (China) Shanghai SIPG	29 December 2020	5th	(Belgium) Franky Vercauteren	4 January 2021
Beerschot	(Argentina) Hernán Losada	Hired by (United States) D.C. United	17 January 2021	10th	(Belgium) Will Still	19 January 2021
Kortrijk	(Belgium) Yves Vanderhaeghe	Sacked	31 January 2021	15th	(Slovenia) Luka Elsner	31 January 2021
Cercle Brugge	(England) Paul Clement	Sacked	1 February 2021	17th	(Belgium) Yves Vanderhaeghe	3 February 2021

== Regular season ==
=== League table ===
Pos	Team	Pld	W	D	L	GF	GA	GD	Pts	Qualification or relegation
1	Club Brugge (C)	34	24	4	6	73	26	+47	76	Qualification for the Europa Conference League and Play-offs I (Note: The regular season winners will qualify for the 2021–22 UEFA Europa Conference League if they do not qualify for the 2021–22 UEFA Champions League in the playoffs or for the 2021–22 UEFA Europa League through the 2020–21 Belgian Cup.)
2	Antwerp	34	18	6	10	57	48	+9	60	Qualification for the Play-offs I
3	Anderlecht	34	15	13	6	51	34	+17	58	Qualification for the Play-offs I
4	Genk (Note: Genk qualifies for at least the play-off round of the Europa League through winning the 2021 Belgian Cup.)	34	16	8	10	67	48	+19	56	Qualification for the Play-offs I
5	Oostende (Note: On 14 April 2021 news was released that both Excel Mouscron and Oostende had not received a Belgian professional football license for the coming season, a requirement to play at the top two levels of Belgian football. For Oostende, a lack of financial transparency, together with generally poor quality and incompleteness of the submitted report, was given as the main reason by the committee for not awarding a license, while Excel Mouscron was refused a license as besides insufficient transparency, the committee also questioned several cash flows and whether the club was creditworthy in general, also due to the fact that the wages for the months of February and March had not yet been paid at that point. For Excel Mouscron, it was already the sixth year running the license was (initially) refused, however, the club has appealed the decision with the Belgian Court for Sports Arbitrage (BAS) successfully on each occasion and intended to do so again. Oostende was planning to launch an appeal as well, with the BAS to rule on the matter for both clubs before the 10th of May. Both clubs were allowed to add new documents to their case, but in case they however still did not receive a license after appeal, knew they would have been forced to relegate to the 2021–22 Belgian Division 2 and start the season with a 3-point penalty. Both Excel Mouscron and Oostende were however eventually awarded a license after appeal, meaning Oostende remained at the top level, while Excel Mouscron only dropped one level.)	34	15	8	11	49	41	+8	53	Qualification for the Play-offs II
6	Standard Liège	34	13	11	10	52	41	+11	50	Qualification for the Play-offs II
7	Gent	34	14	7	13	55	42	+13	49	Qualification for the Play-offs II
8	Mechelen	34	13	9	12	54	54	0	48	Qualification for the Play-offs II
9	Beerschot	34	14	5	15	58	64	−6	47	
10	Zulte Waregem	34	14	4	16	53	69	−16	46	
11	OH Leuven	34	12	9	13	54	59	−5	45	
12	Eupen	34	10	13	11	44	55	−11	43	
13	Charleroi	34	11	9	14	46	49	−3	42	
14	Kortrijk	34	11	6	17	44	57	−13	39	
15	Sint-Truiden	34	10	8	16	41	52	−11	38	
16	Cercle Brugge	34	11	3	20	40	51	−11	36	
17	Waasland-Beveren (R)	34	8	7	19	44	70	−26	31	Qualification for the Relegation play-off
18	Excel Mouscron (R)	34	7	10	17	32	54	−22	31	Relegation to First Division B

Source: Jupiler Pro League (in Dutch), Soccerway
Rules for classification: 1) Points; 2) Matches won; 3) Goal difference; 4) Goals scored; 5) Away matches won; 6) Away goal difference; 7) Away goals scored; 8) Play-off.
(C) Champions; (R) Relegated

=== Results ===
Home \ Away	CLU	ANT	AND	GNK	OOS	STA	GNT	KVM	BEE	ZWA	OHL	EUP	CHA	KVK	STR	CER	W-B	EXM
Club Brugge	—	0–2	3–0	3–2	2–1	3–1	0–1	2–2	0–1	3–0	3–0	3–0	0–1	1–0	1–0	2–1	4–1	4–2
Antwerp	0–2	—	1–4	3–2	1–2	1–1	1–0	4–1	3–2	0–1	3–2	2–2	2–1	4–2	0–0	1–0	3–2	1–1
Anderlecht	2–1	1–0	—	1–0	2–1	0–0	0–0	1–1	2–0	4–1	2–2	1–1	3–0	0–2	3–1	2–0	0–0	1–1
Genk	1–2	4–2	1–2	—	2–2	2–2	1–1	3–1	1–2	3–2	1–1	4–0	2–1	2–0	4–0	2–0	1–1	4–1
Oostende	1–3	1–1	2–2	3–1	—	2–2	2–1	2–0	1–2	3–0	3–1	1–1	3–2	2–1	1–3	1–1	0–2	3–0
Standard Liège	1–1	1–1	1–3	0–0	1–0	—	2–1	2–2	3–0	2–2	1–1	2–2	3–2	2–1	1–2	1–0	3–1	0–1
Gent	0–4	0–1	1–1	1–2	1–0	2–1	—	1–0	5–1	0–3	2–3	2–2	4–0	1–2	1–1	1–0	3–0	4–0
Mechelen	0–3	3–0	2–2	0–0	0–1	0–4	1–1	—	2–3	4–2	2–2	3–0	3–3	1–2	2–0	2–3	2–3	2–1
Beerschot	0–3	1–2	2–1	5–2	1–2	0–3	1–1	1–2	—	3–1	4–2	0–1	2–1	0–0	6–3	1–1	3–2	2–2
Zulte Waregem	0–6	1–3	2–2	1–2	2–1	3–2	2–7	1–2	0–3	—	2–3	2–1	0–2	1–1	0–2	1–0	4–1	1–0
OH Leuven	2–1	2–0	1–0	2–3	1–2	1–0	0–3	1–2	0–1	2–1	—	1–1	1–3	3–1	2–2	2–1	1–2	2–0
Eupen	0–4	0–2	2–0	1–4	1–1	0–4	2–1	1–1	3–1	2–3	3–3	—	3–1	2–0	1–1	1–2	1–1	1–1
Charleroi	1–1	2–0	1–0	1–2	1–0	1–2	0–1	0–1	3–1	1–1	1–1	2–3	—	0–0	0–0	3–0	0–2	1–1
Kortrijk	1–2	1–3	1–3	2–1	3–1	2–1	1–0	1–4	5–5	1–2	0–3	0–0	1–3	—	0–2	1–2	1–3	3–0
Sint-Truiden	1–2	2–3	0–1	1–2	0–0	2–0	2–1	2–1	1–0	1–2	3–1	0–2	1–2	0–0	—	3–0	1–1	0–2
Cercle Brugge	1–2	2–1	0–0	1–5	0–1	0–1	5–2	0–1	2–1	1–3	3–0	1–2	3–4	0–1	3–0	—	2–0	1–2
Waasland-Beveren	0–2	0–3	2–4	1–1	2–0	1–2	1–4	2–3	1–2	1–5	1–3	1–0	1–1	3–4	2–4	0–2	—	2–0
Excel Mouscron	0–0	2–3	1–1	2–0	0–1	1–0	0–1	0–1	3–1	0–1	2–2	0–2	1–1	0–3	3–2	1–2	1–1	—

Source: Jupiler Pro League (in Dutch), Soccerway
Legend: Blue = home team win; Yellow = draw; Red = away team win.

== Play-offs ==
=== Play-Off I ===
The points obtained during the regular season were halved (and rounded up) before the start of the playoff. As a result, the teams started with the following points before the playoff: Club Brugge 38, Antwerp 30, Anderlecht 29 and Genk 28.

Pos	Team	Pld	W	D	L	GF	GA	GD	Pts	Qualification or relegation	CLU	GNK	ANT	AND
1	Club Brugge (C)	6	1	3	2	8	11	−3	44	Qualification for the Champions League group stage	—	1–2	2–1	2–2
2	Genk	6	5	1	0	15	5	+10	44	Qualification for the Champions League third qualifying round	3–0	—	4–0	1–1
3	Antwerp	6	1	2	3	6	11	−5	35	Qualification for the Europa League play-off round	0–0	2–3	—	1–0
4	Anderlecht	6	0	4	2	9	11	−2	33	Qualification for the Europa Conference League third qualifying round	3–3	1–2	2–2	—

Source: Jupiler Pro League (in Dutch), Soccerway
Legend: Blue = home team win; Yellow = draw; Red = away team win.
Rules for classification: 1) Points; 2) Points without (possible) half points added due to rounding; 3) Regular season finishing position.
(C) Champions

=== Play-Off II ===
The points obtained during the regular season were halved (and rounded up) before the start of the playoff. As a result, the teams started with the following points before the playoff: Oostende 27, Standard 25, Gent 25 and Mechelen 24. The points of Oostende and Gent were rounded up, therefore in case of any ties on points at the end of the playoffs, the half point will be deducted for these teams.

Pos	Team	Pld	W	D	L	GF	GA	GD	Pts	Qualification or relegation	GNT	MEC	OOS	STA
1	Gent	6	4	1	1	13	6	+7	38	Qualification for the Europa Conference League second qualifying round	—	2–2	2–1	2–0
2	Mechelen	6	3	2	1	15	11	+4	35		1–2	—	5–3	3–1
3	Oostende	6	2	1	3	15	16	−1	34		0–4	2–2	—	6–2
4	Standard Liège	6	1	0	5	7	17	−10	28		2–1	1–2	1–3	—

Source: Jupiler Pro League (in Dutch), Soccerway
Legend: Blue = home team win; Yellow = draw; Red = away team win.
Rules for classification: 1) Points; 2) Points without (possible) half points added due to rounding; 3) Regular season finishing position.

=== European competition play-offs ===
Originally, the fourth-placed team of the play-offs I (or third-placed team if the regular season winners finish fourth) and the first-placed team of the play-offs II would play two home-and-away matches to determine the Europa Conference League play-off winner, which would qualify for the second qualifying round of the 2021–22 UEFA Europa Conference League. However, since Genk, winners of the 2020–21 Belgian Cup, finished in the regular season top four and qualified for play-offs I, this guaranteed that all four teams of play-offs I would qualify for European competitions. As a result, the play-off final was not played, and the first-placed team of the play-offs II, KAA Gent, qualified for the second qualifying round of the 2021–22 UEFA Europa Conference League.

== Promotion-Relegation play-off ==
The team finishing in 17th place competes in a two-legged match with the runner-up of the 2020–21 Belgian First Division B, with the aggregate winner to play in the 2021–22 Belgian First Division A, while the losing team will take part in the 2021–22 Belgian First Division B.

On 11 April 2021, Seraing from the Belgian First Division B qualified for the promotion-relegation playoff as a loss by Lommel against Union SG meant Seraing could no longer be overtaken for second place. On 8 May 2021, Seraing was promoted to the 2021–22 Belgian First Division A after a 6–3 aggregate win in the two-legged series and Waasland-Beveren was relegated to the 2021–22 Belgian First Division B.

1 May 2021
18:30 CEST

Seraing	1–1	Waasland-Beveren
Mikautadze 90+2' (pen.)	Report	Frey 70' (pen.)

Stade du Pairay, Seraing
Attendance: 0
Referee: Lawrence Visser
8 May 2021
20:45 CEST

Waasland-Beveren	2–5	Seraing
Frey 15' (pen.); Sinani 51'	Report	Mikautadze 22' (pen.), 70'; Sabaouni 45+4'; Faye 62'; Bernier 90+5'

Freethiel Stadion, Beveren
Attendance: 0
Referee: Alexandre Boucaut

Seraing won 6–3 on aggregate.

== Season statistics ==
=== Top scorers - regular season only ===
As of matches played on 18 April 2021.

Rank	Player	Club	Goals
1	(Nigeria) Paul Onuachu	Genk	30
2	(France) Thomas Henry	OH Leuven	21
3	(Belgium) Gianni Bruno	Zulte Waregem	20
4	(Japan) Yuma Suzuki	Sint-Truiden	17
4	(Ukraine) Roman Yaremchuk	Gent	17
6	(Austria) Raphael Holzhauser	Beerschot	16
6	(England) Ike Ugbo	Cercle Brugge	16
8	(Bosnia and Herzegovina) Smail Prevljak	Eupen	15
9	(Belgium) Theo Bongonda	Genk	14
9	(Netherlands) Noa Lang	Club Brugge	14
9	(Germany) Lukas Nmecha	Anderlecht	14

=== Top assists ===
As of matches played on 18 April 2021.

Rank	Player	Club	Assists
1	(Austria) Raphael Holzhauser	Beerschot	16
1	(France) Xavier Mercier	OH Leuven	16
3	(Denmark) Andrew Hjulsager	Oostende	10
3	(Japan) Junya Ito	Genk	10
5	(Netherlands) Ruud Vormer	Club Brugge	9
6	(Israel) Lior Refaelov	Antwerp	8
7	(Mexico) Omar Govea	Zulte Waregem	7
7	(Netherlands) Noa Lang	Club Brugge	7
7	(Japan) Ryota Morioka	Charleroi	7
7	(Belgium) Vadis Odjidja-Ofoe	Gent	7
7	(Belgium) Rob Schoofs	Mechelen	7
7	(Comoros) Faïz Selemani	Kortrijk	7
7	(Belgium) Hans Vanaken	Club Brugge	7

== Awards ==
=== Annual awards ===
Award	Winner	Club
Player of the Year	(Nigeria) Paul Onuachu	Genk
Top goalscorer	(Nigeria) Paul Onuachu	Genk
Manager of the Year	(Germany) Alexander Blessin	Oostende
Breakthrough of the Year	(Netherlands) Noa Lang	Club Brugge

Team of the Year
Goalkeeper	(Belgium) Simon Mignolet (Club Brugge)			
Defence	(Angola) Clinton Mata (Club Brugge)	(Belgium) Arthur Theate (Oostende)		(Belgium) Ritchie De Laet (Royal Antwerp)
Midfield	(Israel) Lior Refaelov (Royal Antwerp)	(Belgium) Bryan Heynen (Genk)	(Austria) Raphael Holzhauser (Beerschot)	(France) Xavier Mercier (OH Leuven)
Attack	(Japan) Junya Ito (Genk)	(Nigeria) Paul Onuachu (Genk)		(Netherlands) Noa Lang (Club Brugge)
