= 2021–22 Belgian Division 3 =

Belgian Division 3
- Season: 2021–22

The 2021–22 Belgian Division 3 was the sixth season of the division in its current format, placed at the fifth-tier of football in Belgium. As the previous season was cancelled in January 2021 due to governmental measures against COVID-19 prohibiting amateur football, the division features nearly exactly the same teams.

The division consists of four separate leagues. Leagues VFV A and VFV B consist of teams with a license from the Voetbalfederatie Vlaanderen (VFV, the Flemish/Dutch speaking wing of the Belgian FA), while the leagues ACFF A and ACFF B contain teams with a license from the Association des Clubs Francophones de Football (ACFF, the French-speaking wing of the RBFA). The champions from each of the four leagues will be promoted to the 2022–23 Belgian Division 2.

== Team changes ==
=== In ===
No new clubs entered as the previous season was cancelled.

=== Out ===
- Stade Brainois merged with AFC Tubize to become Royale Union Tubize-Braine, known as Tubize-Braine. As AFC Tubize was playing at a higher level (Belgian Division 2), the new club continued at this level, thus vacating the place of Stade Brainois in the Belgian Division 3.

=== Mergers ===
- Bambrugge merged with neighbours Mere (which was playing at a lower level) to become Erpe-Mere United.

== Belgian Division 3 VFV A ==
Locations of the 2021–22 Belgian Division 3 VFV A teams

=== League table ===
Pos	Team	Pld	W	D	L	GF	GA	GD	Pts	Qualification or relegation
1	Oostkamp (C, P)	30	23	5	2	83	37	+46	74	Promotion to the 2022–23 Belgian Division 2
2	Lebbeke (P)	30	19	6	5	60	30	+30	63	Qualification for the Promotion play-offs VFV
3	Overijse	30	16	6	8	55	37	+18	54	Qualification for the Promotion play-offs VFV
4	Torhout (O, P)	30	16	6	8	52	45	+7	54	Qualification for the Promotion play-offs VFV
5	Lochristi (Note: Lochristi opted to drop down to the Belgian Provincial Leagues for the coming season due to financial difficulties.) (R)	30	14	6	10	60	47	+13	48	Restarting at bottom level of pyramid
6	Erpe-Mere United (P)	30	13	5	12	45	39	+6	44	Qualification for the Promotion play-offs VFV
7	Hamme	30	12	8	10	49	45	+4	44	
8	Stekene	30	12	6	12	48	38	+10	42	
9	Voorde-Appelterre	30	10	6	14	47	52	−5	36	
10	Wolvertem Merchtem	30	9	9	12	42	39	+3	36	
11	Anzegem	30	10	5	15	47	60	−13	35	
12	Lede	30	10	4	16	47	61	−14	34	
13	Eppegem	30	8	8	14	36	39	−3	32	Qualification for the Relegation play-offs VFV
14	Melsele (R)	30	7	6	17	47	75	−28	27	Relegation to the 2022–23 Belgian Provincial Leagues
15	Sint-Niklaas (R)	30	6	7	17	32	66	−34	25	Relegation to the 2022–23 Belgian Provincial Leagues
16	Rhodienne-De Hoek (R)	30	6	5	19	26	66	−40	23	Relegation to the 2022–23 Belgian Provincial Leagues

Source: vbal4
Rules for classification: 1) Points; 2) Matches won; 3) Goal difference; 4) Goals scored; 5) Away matches won; 6) Goal difference in away matches; 7) Away goals scored.
(C) Champions; (O) Play-off winners; (P) Promoted; (R) Relegated

== Belgian Division 3 VFV B ==
Locations of the 2021–22 Belgian Division 3 VFV B teams

=== League table ===
Pos	Team	Pld	W	D	L	GF	GA	GD	Pts	Qualification or relegation
1	Racing Mechelen (C, P)	30	18	5	7	63	41	+22	59	Promotion to the 2022–23 Belgian Division 2
2	Esperanza Pelt	30	18	4	8	64	38	+26	58	Qualification for the Promotion play-offs VFV
3	Diest	30	16	8	6	47	28	+19	56	Qualification for the Promotion play-offs VFV
4	Lille (P)	30	16	6	8	63	55	+8	54	Qualification for the Promotion play-offs VFV
5	Turnhout (P)	30	13	10	7	53	28	+25	49	Qualification for the Promotion play-offs VFV
6	Sint-Lenaarts	30	13	8	9	49	41	+8	47	
7	Zwarte Leeuw	30	13	7	10	61	38	+23	46	
8	Wellen	30	11	11	8	46	41	+5	44	
9	Termien	30	12	6	12	40	41	−1	42	
10	Betekom	30	12	5	13	53	51	+2	41	
11	Nijlen	30	12	5	13	52	55	−3	41	
12	Beringen	30	11	8	11	48	43	+5	41	
13	Witgoor (O)	30	10	5	15	37	43	−6	35	Qualification for the Relegation play-offs VFV
14	De Kempen (R)	30	5	7	18	35	62	−27	22	Relegation to the 2022–23 Belgian Provincial Leagues
15	Berlaar-Heikant (R)	30	4	9	17	27	70	−43	21	Relegation to the 2022–23 Belgian Provincial Leagues
16	Koersel (R)	30	3	2	25	30	93	−63	11	Relegation to the 2022–23 Belgian Provincial Leagues

Source: vbal4
Rules for classification: 1) Points; 2) Matches won; 3) Goal difference; 4) Goals scored; 5) Away matches won; 6) Goal difference in away matches; 7) Away goals scored.
(C) Champions; (O) Play-off winners; (P) Promoted; (R) Relegated

== Belgian Division 3 ACFF A ==
Locations of the 2021–22 Belgian Division 3 ACFF A teams

=== League table ===
Pos	Team	Pld	W	D	L	GF	GA	GD	Pts	Qualification or relegation
1	Namur FLV (C, P)	28	21	2	5	58	21	+37	65	Promotion to the 2022–23 Belgian Division 2
2	Manageoise	28	14	7	7	61	32	+29	49	Qualification for the Promotion play-offs ACFF
3	Crossing Schaerbeek	28	13	10	5	53	40	+13	49	Qualification for the Promotion play-offs ACFF
4	Aische	28	13	9	6	61	41	+20	48	Qualification for the Promotion play-offs ACFF
5	Tournai	28	13	6	9	38	34	+4	45	
6	Binche (O, P)	28	11	9	8	41	36	+5	42	Qualification for the Promotion play-offs ACFF
7	Symphorinois	28	12	5	11	40	35	+5	41	
8	Tamines	28	10	10	8	32	34	−2	40	
9	Mons	28	9	13	6	55	39	+16	40	
10	Ostiches-Ath	28	10	7	11	41	39	+2	37	
11	Saint-Ghislain	28	9	9	10	39	51	−12	36	
12	CS Braine	28	9	4	15	47	57	−10	31	
13	Gosselies	28	5	7	16	21	50	−29	22	Qualification for the Relegation play-offs ACFF
14	Pont-à-Celles-Buzet (R)	28	2	12	14	20	49	−29	18	Relegation to the 2022–23 Belgian Provincial Leagues
15	Stockel (R)	28	2	4	22	32	81	−49	10	Relegation to the 2022–23 Belgian Provincial Leagues

Source: vbal4
Rules for classification: 1) Points; 2) Matches won; 3) Goal difference; 4) Goals scored; 5) Away matches won; 6) Goal difference in away matches; 7) Away goals scored.
(C) Champions; (O) Play-off winners; (P) Promoted; (R) Relegated

== Belgian Division 3 ACFF B ==
Locations of the 2021–22 Belgian Division 3 ACFF B teams

=== League table ===
Pos	Team	Pld	W	D	L	GF	GA	GD	Pts	Qualification or relegation
1	Dison (C, P)	30	19	6	5	69	35	+34	63	Promotion to the 2022–23 Belgian Division 2
2	Rochefort	30	18	3	9	63	50	+13	57	Qualification for the Promotion play-offs ACFF
3	Raeren-Eynatten	30	17	2	11	65	51	+14	53	Qualification for the Promotion play-offs ACFF
4	Herstal	30	15	5	10	57	33	+24	50	Qualification for the Promotion play-offs ACFF
5	Sprimont	30	15	5	10	49	40	+9	50	Qualification for the Promotion play-offs ACFF
6	Onhaye	30	14	7	9	50	33	+17	49	
7	Richelle	30	13	5	12	56	48	+8	44	
8	Jodoigne	30	12	5	13	49	44	+5	41	
9	Habay	30	11	8	11	45	44	+1	41	
10	Marloie	30	12	3	15	55	64	−9	39	
11	Mormont	30	10	9	11	50	60	−10	39	
12	Aywaille	30	11	2	17	47	68	−21	35	
13	Huy (O)	30	9	7	14	32	46	−14	34	Qualification for the Relegation play-offs ACFF
14	Oppagne-Wéris (R)	30	8	8	14	39	61	−22	32	Relegation to the 2022–23 Belgian Provincial Leagues
15	Wanze Bas-Oha (R)	30	7	6	17	42	64	−22	27	Relegation to the 2022–23 Belgian Provincial Leagues
16	Gouvy (R)	30	6	5	19	39	66	−27	23	Relegation to the 2022–23 Belgian Provincial Leagues

Source: vbal4
Rules for classification: 1) Points; 2) Matches won; 3) Goal difference; 4) Goals scored; 5) Away matches won; 6) Goal difference in away matches; 7) Away goals scored.
(C) Champions; (O) Play-off winners; (P) Promoted; (R) Relegated

== Championship matches ==
Both the two VFV and two ACFF teams winning their leagues can arrange a title match to determine the overall VFV and ACFF champions of the Belgian Division 3. This season, the overall ACFF champion was decided in a single match, with Namur FLV winning the title. On VFV side, Oostkamp and Racing Mechelen decided not to play a championship match. There was hence also no match between the overall VFV and ACFF champions.

=== Championship match ACFF ===
8 May 2022

Namur FLV	4–1 (a.e.t.)	Dison
Dheur 34'; Rosmolen 97'; Tonnet 102'; Olojede 106'	report	Vandebon 12'

Stade communal de Namur

Namur FLV was awarded the symbolic title of Belgian Division 3 ACFF champion.

== Promotion play-offs ==
=== Promotion play-offs VFV ===
The teams finishing in second place in the Belgian Division 3 VFV A and Belgian Division 3 VFV B take part in a promotion playoff first round together with three period winners from these both divisions. These 8 teams from the VFV play the first round of a promotion-playoff, with the four winners promoted to the 2022–23 Belgian Division 2. Losing teams will continue in rounds 2 and 3 in case extra places open up.

In division A, champions Oostkamp won all periods, meaning that in theory the teams in place 2 through 5 would qualify. 5th placed Lochristi opted however to stop playing at this level and did not take part, allowing Erpe-Mere United to take part.

In division B, second-place finishers Esperanza Pelt were joined by Lille United (4th) who had won a period title. The remaining spots were taken by the highest finishers not already qualified, 3rd place Diest and 5th place Turnhout.

==== VFV Round 1 ====
7 May 2022
18:30

Erpe-Mere United	3–1	Esperanza Pelt
Van Den Meersch 2', 41'; Matthijs 63'	report	Ella Ella 63'

7 May 2022
20:00

Overijse	0–3	Lebbeke
	report	Van De Velde 44', 48', 75'

8 May 2022
15:00

Turnhout	3–1	Torhout
Coeckelbergs 13'; Jacobs 60'; Tourki 90'	report	Andries 89'

8 May 2022
15:00

Lille	2–1	Diest
Gerritsen 45' (pen.); Flebus 66'	report	Erciyas 73'

Erpe-Mere United, Lebbeke, Turnhout and Lille were promoted. The losing teams qualified for the Promotion play-offs VFV Round 2.

==== VFV Round 2 ====
14 May 2022
20:00

Overijse	2–1	Esperanza Pelt
Dehond 2'; Maluka 71' (pen.)	report	Meeus 90+3'

15 May 2022
15:00

Torhout	5–0	Diest
Margo 12'; Timmerman 22'; Andries 35', 64', 70'	report

Overijse and Torhout qualified for the promotion play-offs VFV Round 3. Pelt and Diest were eliminated and remain in the Belgian Division 3.

==== VFV Round 3 ====
22 May 2022
15:00

Torhout	1–0	Overijse
Timmerman 74'	report

Torhout also achieved promotion through winning Round 3. Overijse was first in line in case another spot would open up.

=== Promotion play-offs ACFF ===
The teams finishing in second place in the Belgian Division 3 ACFF A and Belgian Division 3 ACFF B take part in a promotion playoff first round together with three period winners from these both divisions. These eight teams would play-off for one single promotion place up for grabs.

In Division 3 ACFF A, Manageoise, as team finishing in second place in the Belgian Division 2 ACFF A qualified for the Promotion play-offs ACFF, as well as Binche (6th overall) for winning the first period. The two other periods were won by champions Union Namur-Fosses and hence 3rd and 4th placed teams Crossing Schaerbeek and Aische were invited as well.

The teams in positions 2 through 5 qualified from the Division 3 ACFF B as no team outside the top five had managed to win a period title. Hence, Rochefort, Raeren-Eynatten, Herstal and Sprimont took part.

==== ACFF Round 1 ====
Binche	3–2	Herstal
Michez 3'; Bastaens 50', 61'	report	Wanderson 16' (pen.); Diallo 24'

Aische	0–1	Sprimont
	report	Otte 61' (pen.)

Manageoise	3–0	Rochefort
Diotallevi 49'; Papassarantis 55'; Sebaihi 65'	report

Raeren-Eynatten	0–2	Crossing Schaerbeek
	report	Tshibay 55', 80'

Binche, Sprimont, Manageoise and Crossing Schaerbeek qualified for ACFF Round 2, the other teams are eliminated and remain in the Belgian Division 3.

==== ACFF Round 2 ====
Manageoise	0–3	Sprimont
	report	Keysers 29'; Camara 60'; Seck 66'

Crossing Schaerbeek	~~0–0~~ Awarded 0–5 FF win to Binche (a.e.t.)	Binche
	report
Penalties
	4–4

Sprimont qualified for ACFF Round 3, Manageoise was eliminated. The match between Crossing Schaerbeek and Binche was stopped due to supporter violence, after the match had ended 0–0 after extra time and teams were tied 4–4 during the penalty shootout. While both teams' supporters were taking part in the fight, the home team was penalized with a 0–5 forfeit loss for not taking sufficient safety precautions, allowing supporters of both teams to come together in the same stand during the penalty shootouts, eventually also leading to a pitch invasion. Binche therebye progressed to the ACFF Round 3, Crossing Schaerbeek was eliminated.

==== ACFF Round 3 ====
Sprimont	1–3	Binche
Seck 66'	report	Lespagne 27'; Yaman 45+1', 73'

Binche is promoted to the Belgian First Division 2, Sprimont is first in line in case another spot opens up.

== Relegation play-offs ==
=== ACFF ===
8 May 2022

Huy	1–1 (a.e.t.)	Gosselies
Boussard 96'		Baynon 97'
Penalties
	4–2

Prior to the match, it was known that the winner of this ACFF play-off would avoid relegation, while the loser would need to await the results of higher divisions. Huy was thus spared while Gosselies was unsure.

=== VFV ===
8 May 2022

Eppegem	1–1 (a.e.t.)	Witgoor
Rijmenams 35' (pen.)	report	Van Roy 88'
Penalties
	3–5

Prior to the match, it was known that the winner of this VFV play-off would avoid relegation, while the loser would need to await the results of higher divisions. Witgoor Dessel was thus spared while Eppegem was unsure.

== Number of teams by provinces ==
Number of teams	Province or region	Team(s) in VFV A	Team(s) in VFV B	Team(s) in ACFF A	Team(s) in ACFF B
9	Antwerp	none	Berlaar-H., De Kempen, Lille, KRC Mechelen, Nijlen, Sint-Lenaarts, Turnhout, Witgoor and Zwarte Leeuw	–	–
9	East Flanders	Erpe-Mere, Hamme, Lebbeke, Lede, Lochristi, Melsele, Sint-Niklaas, Stekene and Voorde-Appelterre	none	–	–
9	Hainaut	–	–	Binche, Gosselies, Manage, Ostiches-Ath, P-à-Celles, Ren. Mons, Saint-Ghislain, Symphorinois, Tournai	none
8	Liège	–	–	none	Aywaille, Dison, Herstal, Huy, Raeren-Eynatten, Richelle, Sprimont, Wanze Bas-Oha
6	Flemish Brabant	Eppegem, Overijse, Rhode-De Hoek and Wolvertem Merchtem	Betekom and Diest	–	–
5	Limburg	none	Beringen, Koersel, Pelt, Termien and Wellen	–	–
5	Luxembourg	–	–	none	Gouvy, Habay, Marloie, Mormont, Oppagne-Wéris
5	Namur	–	–	Aische, Namur FLV and Tamines	Onhaye, Rochefort
3	West Flanders	Anzegem, Oostkamp, Torhout	none	–	–
2	Brussels	none	none	Schaerbeek and Stockel	none
2	Walloon Brabant	–	–	CS Braine	Jodoigne
