= Markus Pflanz =

German football manager (born 1975)

Personal information
- Date of birth: 31 December 1975 (age 50)
- Place of birth: Germany

Managerial career
- Years: Team
- 2018–2019: TSV Künzell
- 2020–2022: Oostende
- 2022: Sint-Truiden

Markus Pflanz (born 31 December 1975) is a German football manager.

== Career ==
In 2018, Pflanz was appointed manager of German seventh tier side TSV Künzell. In 2022, he was appointed manager of Oostende in the Belgian top flight. In June 2022 Pflanz moved to league rivals Sint-Truiden as assistant coach on the staff of German head coach Bernd Hollerbach.
