= Marc Noë =

Belgian football manager

Personal information
- Date of birth: 18 October 1962 (age 64)
- Position: Midfielder

Senior career*
Years	Team	Apps	(Gls)
1982–1986	Sint-Niklaas		
1986–1988	Berchem Sport		
1988–1991	Boom		
1991–1994	Verbroedering Geel		

Managerial career
- 1994: Verbroedering Geel
- 1995–1997: Beerschot (assistant)
- 1997–1999: Beerschot
- 2005–2006: KSK Lebbeke
- 2015–2018: Beerschot VA (assistant)
- 2021: Beerschot VA (caretaker)
- * Club domestic league appearances and goals

Marc Noë (born 18 October 1962) is a Belgian football manager and former player who played as a midfielder.
