= Jordi Condom =

Spanish footballer and manager

Personal information
- Full name: Jordi Condom Aulí
- Date of birth: 29 June 1969 (age 57)
- Place of birth: Palamós, Spain
- Height: 1.78 m (5 ft 10 in)
- Position: Midfielder

Team information
- Current team: AD Alcorcón B (manager)

Youth career
- 1985–1986: Barcelona
- 1986–1988: Palamós

Senior career*
Years	Team	Apps	(Gls)
1988–1995	Palamós	193	(7)
1995–1998	Figueres	93	(8)
1998–2003	Palamós	153	(6)
Total		439	(21)

Managerial career
- 2002–2007: Barcelona (youth)
- 2007–2009: Palamós
- 2009–2011: Palamós
- 2012–2015: Eupen (assistant)
- 2015–2017: Eupen
- 2018: Roeselare
- 2019–2020: Al-Arabi (assistant)
- 2021: Seraing
- 2022: Waasland-Beveren
- 2024–: AD Alcorcón B
- * Club domestic league appearances and goals

Jordi Condom Aulí (born 29 June 1969) is a Spanish former professional footballer who played as a midfielder, currently a manager.

He spent most of his playing career at Palamós, including six seasons in the Segunda División, and started managing at the same club. He worked for several years in Belgium, leading four clubs in the first and second divisions.

== Playing career ==
Born in Palamós, Girona, Catalonia, Condom was a youth product at FC Barcelona's La Masia. His 15-year senior career was exclusively associated to Palamós CF (two spells) and UE Figueres, and he played 178 Segunda División games for the first club over six seasons, scoring as many goals.

In 1989, Condom helped Palamós promote from Segunda División B for the first time in their history. He made his second-tier debut on 29 October of that year, featuring the full 90 minutes in a 0–0 home draw against UD Salamanca, and scored his first goal the following 12 February to contribute to a 2–2 draw at Atlético Madrid B.

Condom retired in June 2003 at the age of 34, following his second stint at the Estadi Palamós Costa Brava.

== Coaching career ==
Condom began working as a youth coach for Barcelona in 2002, being appointed at Palamós' first team in December 2007 and being fired in November 2009 after four home defeats. He was reinstated shortly after.

In the summer of 2012, Condom moved abroad and joined his compatriot Tintín Márquez's staff at Belgian Second Division side K.A.S. Eupen. On 31 March 2015, after the latter's dismissal, he was named manager.

At the end of the 2015–16 campaign, with Condom still at the helm, Eupen reached the First Division A for the first time in the club's 71-year history after finishing second to RWS Bruxelles, who were relegated due to financial irregularities. On the back of the promotion he was given a new year-long contract, then was dismissed in November 2017.

In January 2018, Condom was hired by K.S.V. Roeselare on a deal with a full season as a reward for keeping them in the First Division B. He succeeded in this, but was relieved of his duties in November. In December, he was named assistant to Heimir Hallgrímsson at Qatar Stars League's Al-Arabi SC.

On 28 May 2021, Condom signed a two-year contract with R.F.C. Seraing, recently returned to the Belgian top flight. The following February, he moved back to the country's division two with Waasland-Beveren where he had previously acted as sporting director; he returned to the previous role in June as Wim De Decker was hired.
