= Stefan Krämer =

German football manager (born 1967)

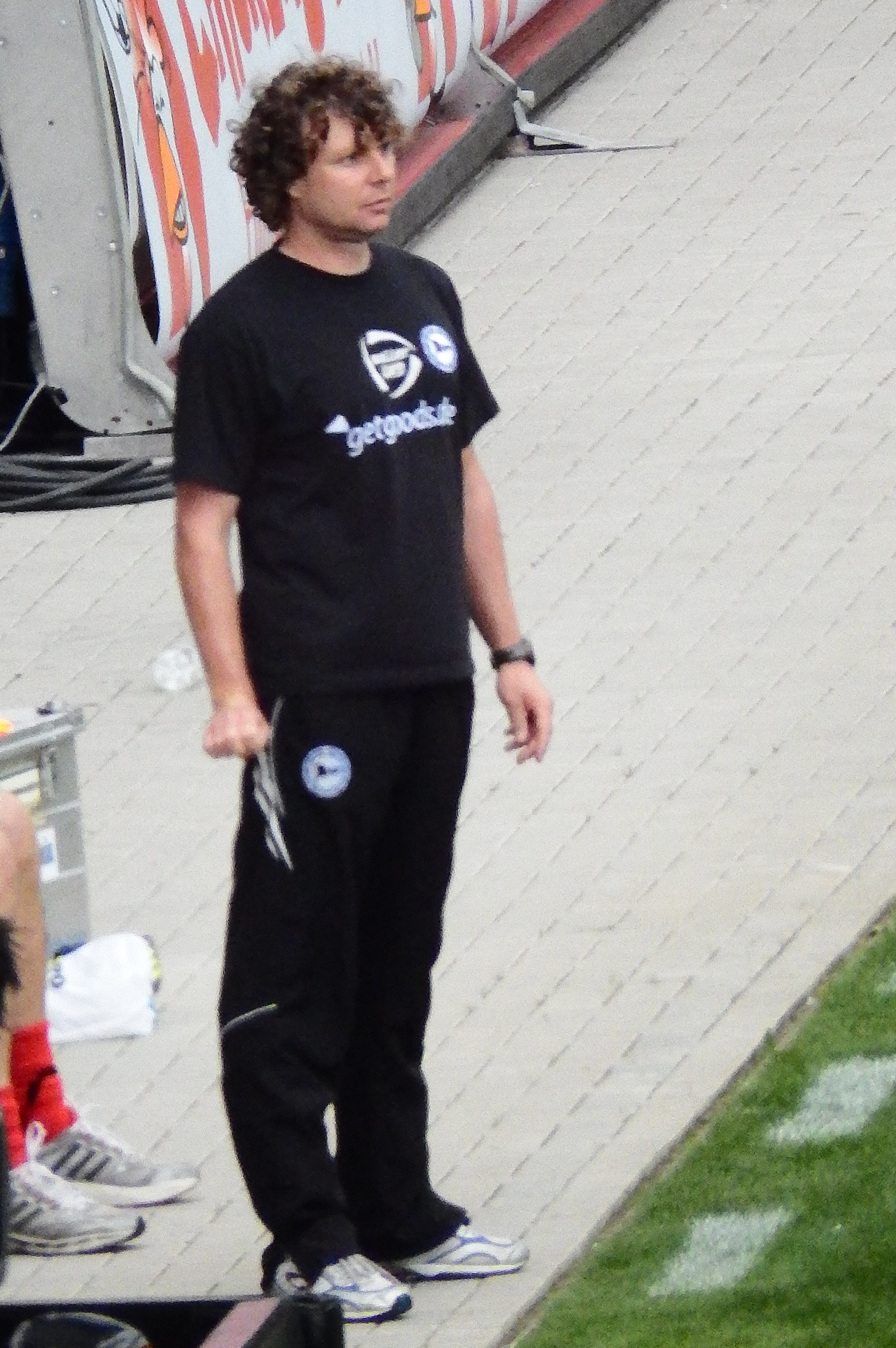
- Krämer in 2013

Personal information
- Full name: Stefan Jürgen Krämer
- Date of birth: 23 March 1967 (age 59)
- Place of birth: Mainz, West Germany
- Position: Midfielder

Senior career*
Years	Team	Apps	(Gls)
- FV Bad Honnef
- FV Rheinbrohl

Managerial career
- 1998–2000: FV Rheinbrohl
- 2000–2002: TSG Irlich 1882
- 2002–2011: SV Roßbach/Verscheid
- 2011–2014: Arminia Bielefeld
- 2014–2015: Energie Cottbus
- 2016–2017: Rot-Weiß Erfurt
- 2018–2019: KFC Uerdingen
- 2019: 1. FC Magdeburg
- 2020–2021: KFC Uerdingen
- 2021–2022: Eupen
- 2022–2023: SV Meppen
- * Club domestic league appearances and goals

Stefan Jürgen Krämer (born 23 March 1967) is a German professional football manager, who last managed SV Meppen.

== Career ==
Krämer was a rather unknown coach in German regional football, when, at the age of 44, he became the assistant manager of Arminia Bielefeld. Arminia began that season with only five points out of ten matches, so that the manager Markus von Ahlen who had brought Krämer to Arminia before had to leave and Stefan Krämer became Arminias interim manager. Because of his surprising success he became Arminias main manager later on. In his first season Arminia still had some weak phases but in the 2012–13 season he managed Arminias qualification for the 2. Bundesliga. He also managed Arminias qualification for the second round of the DFB-Pokal twice. Thus, he had become very popular in Bielefeld and developed a high identification with the club (including a huge tattoo on his chest). From September 2013 onwards, Arminia played a very weak season, so that Krämer was dismissed in February 2014. He finished with a record of 42 wins, 23 draws, and 27 losses. Also in Cottbus he was complimented for his high commitment but had to leave because the weak beginning of his second season there. He finished with a record of 17 wins, 14 draws, and 18 losses with Energie Cottbus.

He was appointed as the head coach of Rot-Weiß Erfurt on 30 December 2015. On 2 October 2017, he was sacked.

In March 2018 he replaced Michael Wiesinger as manager of KFC Uerdingen. He was sacked on 28 January 2019.

He joined 1. FC Magdeburg for the 2019–20 season. He was sacked on 22 December 2019.

He returned to Uerdingen on 10 March 2020. On 13 April 2021, he was sacked.

In early June 2021, Krämer became the new head coach of Belgian Jupiler Pro League team Eupen. He was fired on 16 Februar 2022 after a string of poor results. In the summer of 2022, he was signed by SV Meppen. In March 2023, he was sacked.

== Career record ==
As of 4 March 2023

Team	From	To	Record					
Team	From	To	G	W	D	L	Win %	Ref.
SV Roßbach/Verscheid	1 July 2002	30 June 2011	139	46	40	53	33.09	
Arminia Bielefeld	21 September 2011	23 February 2014	92	42	23	27	45.65	
Energie Cottbus	1 July 2014	19 September 2015	49	17	14	18	34.69	
Rot-Weiß Erfurt	1 January 2016	2 October 2017	64	27	14	23	42.19	
KFC Uerdingen	15 March 2018	28 January 2019	39	29	2	8	74.36	
1. FC Magdeburg	1 July 2019	22 December 2019	20	6	9	5	30.00	
KFC Uerdingen	10 March 2020	13 April 2021	42	10	15	17	23.81	
Eupen	1 July 2021	16 February 2022	31	10	7	14	32.26	
SV Meppen	1 July 2022	4 March 2023	26	3	11	12	11.54	
Total			502	190	135	177	37.85	—
