= Javier Torrente =

Argentine football manager (born 1969)

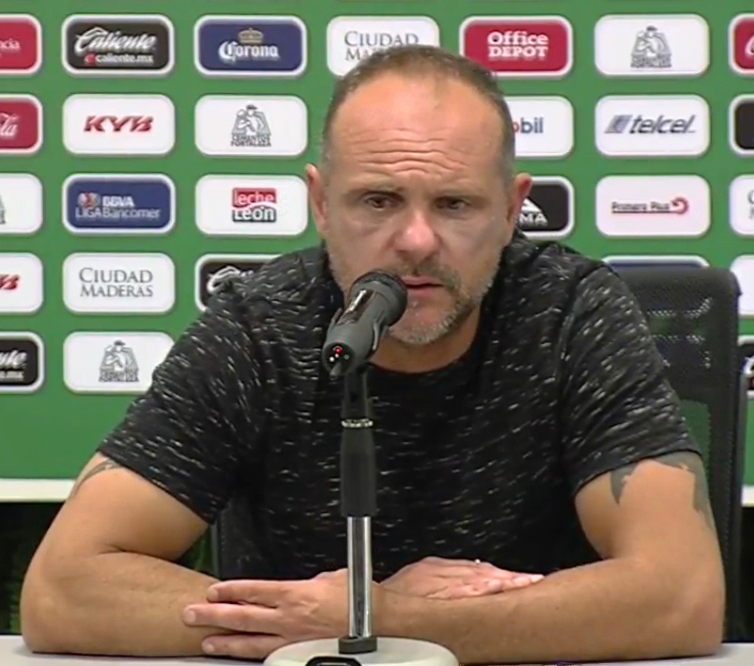
- Torrente in 2017

Personal information
- Full name: Javier Luis Torrente
- Date of birth: 8 June 1969 (age 57)
- Place of birth: Rosario, Argentina

Team information
- Current team: Rubio Ñu (manager)

Managerial career
- Years: Team
- 1996: Atlas (assistant)
- 1997–1998: Vélez Sarsfield (assistant)
- 1998: Espanyol (assistant)
- 1998–2004: Argentina (assistant)
- 2007–2008: Cerro Porteño
- 2008: Coronel Bolognesi
- 2009–2010: Libertad
- 2010–2011: Cerro Porteño
- 2011: Newell's Old Boys
- 2012: Nacional Asunción
- 2012: Cobreloa
- 2014–2015: Marseille (assistant)
- 2015–2016: Once Caldas
- 2016–2017: León
- 2018: Everton Viña del Mar
- 2019: Morelia
- 2019–2020: Everton Viña del Mar
- 2021–2022: Beerschot
- 2022: Deportes Antofagasta
- 2024: Universidad de Concepción
- 2025–2026: Everton Viña del Mar
- 2026–: Rubio Ñu

Javier Luis Torrente (born 8 June 1969) is an Argentine football manager, currently in charge of Paraguayan club Rubio Ñu.

== Career ==
Torrente has been assistant manager to Marcelo Bielsa at Vélez Sársfield, Espanyol, Argentina and Olympique de Marseille. He has managed Cerro Porteño and Newell's Old Boys. He resigned from Newell's after 12 months in charge in 2011. Before managing Club Nacional, Cobreloa, Once Caldas and Club León.

On 10 June 2018, he was appointed as manager of Everton de Viña del Mar, with him citing his former manager Marcelo Bielsa as a big influence of the move.

== Personal life ==
His younger brother, Diego, is a football manager who has mainly worked as an assistant coach.

== Managerial statistics ==
As of September 1, 2026

Team	Nat	Years	Record				
Team	Nat	Years	G	W	D	L	Win %
Cerro Porteño	(Paraguay)	2007 - 2008	62	36	12	14	58.06
Coronel Bolognesi	(Peru)	2008	24	8	4	12	33.33
Club Libertad	(Paraguay)	2009 - 2010	17	10	5	2	58.82
Cerro Porteño	(Paraguay)	2010 - 2011	27	13	10	4	48.15
Newell's Old Boys	(Argentina)	2011	18	4	8	6	22.22
Club Nacional	(Paraguay)	2012	16	7	1	8	43.75
Cobreloa	(Chile)	2012	26	10	4	12	38.46
Once Caldas	(Colombia)	2015 - 2016	25	12	6	7	48.00
Club León	(Mexico)	2016 - 2017	47	21	10	16	44.68
Everton	(Chile)	2018	15	7	4	4	46.67
Morelia	(Mexico)	2019	16	4	5	7	25.00
Everton	(Chile)	2019 - 2020	29	9	11	9	31.03
Beerschot	(Belgium)	2021-2022	21	5	3	13	23.81
Deportes Antofagasta	(Chile)	2022	21	7	3	11	33.33
Universidad de Concepción	(Chile)	2024	26	10	8	8	38.46
Everton	(Chile)	2025-2026	10	1	1	8	10.00
Rubio Ñu	(Paraguay)	2026-present	3	1	1	1	33.33
Total			403	165	96	142	40.94
