= Yves Vanderhaeghe =

Belgian football manager and former player

Personal information
- Date of birth: 30 January 1970 (age 56)
- Place of birth: Roeselare, Belgium
- Height: 1.80 m (5 ft 11 in)
- Position: Defensive midfielder

Team information
- Current team: Francs Borains (manager)

Youth career
- 1978–1986: Roeselare

Senior career*
Years	Team	Apps	(Gls)
1986–1992	Roeselare	87	(11)
1986–1988	→ Cercle Brugge (loan)	1	(0)
1992–1994	Mouscron	56	(11)
1994–1997	Eendracht Aalst	94	(11)
1998–2000	Mouscron	80	(11)
2000–2006	Anderlecht	150	(10)
2007–2008	Roeselare	11	(0)
Total		479	(54)

International career
1999–2005	Belgium	48	(2)

Managerial career
- 2008–2014: Kortrijk (assistant)
- 2014–2015: Kortrijk
- 2015–2017: Oostende
- 2017–2018: Gent
- 2018–2021: Kortrijk
- 2021: Cercle Brugge
- 2022: Oostende
- 2023: Al-Faisaly
- 2024–2025: Kortrijk
- 2025–: Francs Borains
- * Club domestic league appearances and goals

Yves Vanderhaeghe (Dutch pronunciation: [ˈi vɑndərˈɦaːɣə]; born 30 January 1970) is a Belgian football manager and former player who played as a defensive midfielder. He is the manager of Challenger Pro League club Francs Borains.

Known for his tackling, hard-working approach and stamina, he played for five clubs during his 22-year professional career, amassing Belgian Pro League totals of 340 games and 32 goals.

A late bloomer, Vanderhaeghe did not reach the Belgium national team until the age of 29, but still went on to collect nearly 50 caps, representing the nation in one World Cup and one European Championship.

== Club career ==
At the age of 16, Vanderhaeghe moved from hometown's K.S.V. Roeselare to Cercle Brugge KSV, on loan, but he only played one game in two seasons. Subsequently, he returned to his first club, playing four years in the Belgian Third Division and two in the second, now with the shirt of R.E. Mouscron.

Vanderhaeghe first established himself in the Pro League with K.S.C. Eendracht Aalst, amassing more than 100 official appearances and adding 11 goals in the league alone. In January 1998 he returned to Mouscron, scoring a career-best eight times in the 1999–2000 campaign as the Wallonia team finished in fourth position, nearly qualifying for the UEFA Cup.

Aged already 30, Vanderhaeghe signed with R.S.C. Anderlecht. In his first two years combined he appeared in 65 matches, helping the Brussels side to the league and the domestic supercup in his debut campaign; in the following years he began to be irregularly used, due to persistent injury problems.

During the winter-break of 2006–07, 37-year-old Vanderhaeghe was told to look for a new club, and he joined another old acquaintance, Roeselaere, by then competing in the first division. He retired in June 2008.

== International career ==
Vanderhaeghe made 48 appearances for the Belgium national team, his debut coming on 30 May 1999 against Peru in a friendly tournament in Japan at the age of 29.

Vanderhaeghe represented the nation in UEFA Euro 2000 – played on home soil – and the 2002 FIFA World Cup, totalling seven appearances and helping the country to the round-of-16 in the latter competition (2–0 loss against eventual winners Brazil). He scored his two only goals for Belgium in the historic 10–1 win against San Marino in Brussels for the 2002 World Cup qualifiers, on 28 February 2001.

== Coaching career ==
Vanderhaeghe worked as assistant manager at K.V. Kortrijk.

On 11 May 2015, Vanderhaeghe was appointed head coach of K.V. Oostende.

Shortly after he was dismissed at Oostende he was appointed as the new manager of Gent, where he stayed for one year.

On 15 November 2018, Vanderhaeghe became the new manager of Kortrijk, where he started his second term as head coach. On 31 January 2021, Kortrijk made an end to the collaboration after a 3–1 home loss against Charleroi.

From February 2021 till November 2021 Vanderhaeghe was the manager of Cercle Brugge. During the 2020–21 season, he saved Cercle from relegation into the Belgian First Division B. He was sacked on 28 November 2021, a day after Cercle's first home win of the season, a 3–1 win against KV Mechelen, with the club in 17th position out of 18.

On 11 February 2022 Vanderhaeghe was appointed as the new manager of K.V. Oostende, his second time at the club.

On 15 June 2023, Vanderhaeghe was appointed as the manager of Saudi First Division side Al-Faisaly. On 15 November 2023, Vanderhaeghe left the club by mutual consent.

On 12 November 2025, Vanderhaeghe was hired by Francs Borains in the second tier.

== Honours ==
Anderlecht

- Belgian First Division: 2000–01, 2003–04, 2005–06
- Belgian Supercup: 2000, 2001
- Belgian League Cup: 2000
- Belgian Sports Team of the Year: 2000
- Jules Pappaert Cup: 2001

Belgium

- FIFA Fair Play Trophy: 2002 World Cup
