= Luka Elsner =

Slovenian footballer and manager (born 1982)

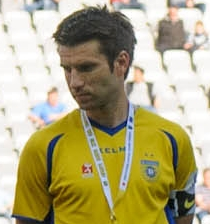
- Elsner with Domžale in 2012

Personal information
- Date of birth: 2 August 1982 (age 44)
- Place of birth: Ljubljana, SR Slovenia, Yugoslavia
- Height: 1.77 m (5 ft 10 in)
- Position: Defender

Youth career
- Cannes
- Nice

Senior career*
Years	Team	Apps	(Gls)
–2002	Nice B		
2002–2004	US Cagnes		
2004–2009	Domžale	181	(4)
2010	Austria Kärnten	15	(0)
2010	Domžale	4	(0)
2010	Al-Muharraq		
2011–2012	Domžale	42	(1)

International career
2002	Slovenia U21	1	(0)
2008	Slovenia	1	(0)

Managerial career
- 2013–2016: Domžale
- 2016–2017: Olimpija Ljubljana
- 2017–2018: Pafos
- 2018–2019: Union Saint-Gilloise
- 2019–2020: Amiens
- 2021: Kortrijk
- 2021–2022: Standard Liège
- 2022–2024: Le Havre
- 2024–2025: Reims
- 2025–2026: Cracovia
- 2026: Lausanne-Sport
- * Club domestic league appearances and goals

Luka Elsner (born 2 August 1982) is a Slovenian professional football manager and former player.

== Club career ==
Growing up in France, Elsner began his career at Nice, where he was part of the youth set-up and the reserve team. He later played for US Cagnes. In 2004, Elsner joined Domžale. He holds the club record for competitive appearances. Elsner also later played for Austria Kärnten and Al-Muharraq, before finishing his career at Domžale in 2012.

== International career ==
Elsner made his debut for Slovenia on 26 May 2008 in a friendly match against Sweden, replacing Bojan Jokić late in the second half.

== Personal life ==
Elsner was born into a footballing family. His grandfather, Branko, and his father, Marko, were both footballers. His younger brother, Rok, is also a former professional footballer. He is married to Iris, with whom he has a daughter, Ameli.

In addition to his native Slovenian, Elsner also speaks English, French, Italian, and Spanish. After taking the position at Cracovia, he began learning Polish and within five months was giving interviews in it.

== Managerial statistics ==
As of match played 1 November 2026

Managerial record by team and tenure
Team	From	To	Record				
Team	From	To	P	W	D	L	Win %
Domžale	21 August 2013	2 September 2016	131	57	36	38	43.51
Olimpija Ljubljana	2 September 2016	9 March 2017	19	13	3	3	68.42
Pafos	30 June 2017	21 January 2018	23	6	6	11	26.09
Union Saint-Gilloise	23 May 2018	19 June 2019	44	22	10	12	50.00
Amiens	19 June 2019	28 September 2020	37	7	14	16	18.92
Kortrijk (Note: Though Elsner was officially appointed on 31 January 2021, he was quarantined due to the COVID-19 pandemic protocols and until the end of his quarantine the matches were managed by his assistant Bart Meert. For statistical purposes, the table includes all Kortrijk games since his official appointment.)	31 January 2021	6 October 2021	21	8	4	9	38.10
Standard Liège	7 October 2021	20 April 2022	27	7	8	12	25.93
Le Havre	20 June 2022	25 June 2024	76	29	27	20	38.16
Reims	25 June 2024	3 February 2025	22	6	8	8	27.27
Cracovia	1 July 2025	20 April 2026	31	10	10	11	32.26
Lausanne-Sport	1 June 2026	3 November 2026	14	3	3	8	21.43
Total			445	168	129	148	37.75

== Honours ==
=== Player ===
Domžale

- Slovenian PrvaLiga: 2006–07, 2007–08
- Slovenian Cup: 2010–11
- Slovenian Super Cup: 2007, 2011

Al-Muharraq

- Bahraini Premier League: 2010–11

=== Manager ===
Le Havre

- Ligue 2: 2022–23

Individual

- Ligue 2 Manager of the Year: 2022–23
