= Bernd Hollerbach =

German football manager (born 1969)

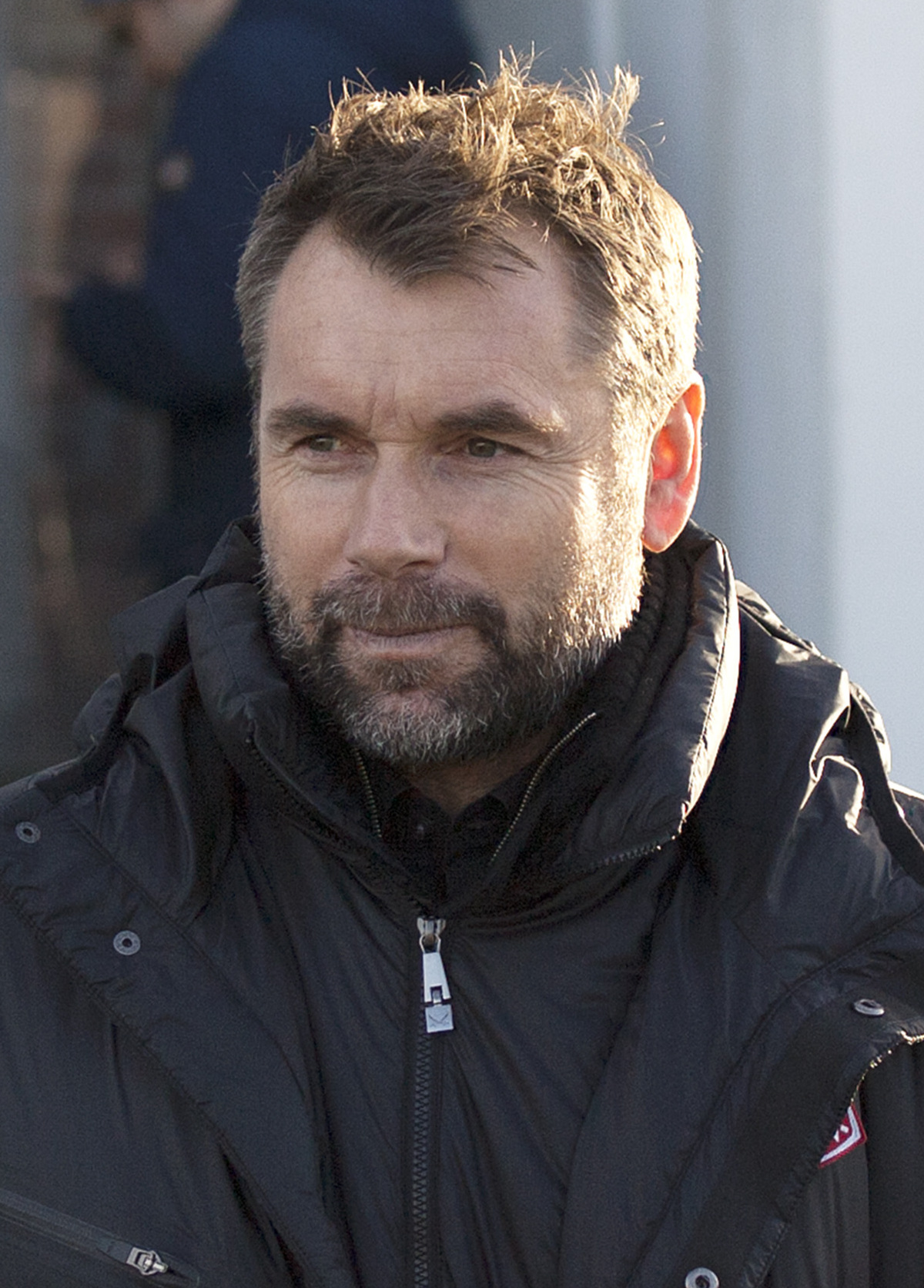
- Hollerbach in 2015

Personal information
- Date of birth: 8 December 1969 (age 56)
- Place of birth: Würzburg, West Germany
- Height: 1.77 m (5 ft 10 in)
- Position: Midfielder

Youth career
- 1976–1988: ASV Rimpar

Senior career*
Years	Team	Apps	(Gls)
1988–1991	Würzburger Kickers		
1991–1995	FC St. Pauli	143	(6)
1995–1996	1. FC Kaiserslautern	10	(0)
1996–2004	Hamburger SV	197	(4)

Managerial career
- 2005–2006: VfL 93 Hamburg
- 2006–2007: VfB Lübeck
- 2008: VfL Wolfsburg II
- 2014–2017: Würzburger Kickers
- 2018: Hamburger SV
- 2019–2020: Mouscron
- 2021–2023: Sint-Truiden
- 2024: Hansa Rostock
- * Club domestic league appearances and goals

Bernd Hollerbach (born 8 December 1969) is a German professional football manager and former player. He last managed Hansa Rostock.

Throughout his playing career, he operated as a left-back for Würzburger Kickers, FC St. Pauli, 1. FC Kaiserslautern, and Hamburger SV, with the latter being the club where he spent the most extended period of his career, spanning over eight and a half years.

Upon concluding his playing tenure, Hollerbach transitioned into coaching, initially undertaking roles with VfL 93 Hamburg and VfB Lübeck. Subsequently, from 2007 to 2012, he served as an assistant coach under Felix Magath at VfL Wolfsburg—during which they secured the Bundesliga title in 2009—and Schalke 04. Following this period, Hollerbach assumed the position of head coach for Würzburger Kickers from 2014 to 2017, successfully guiding them from the Regionalliga Bayern to the 2. Bundesliga. However, his tenure concluded after the club's relegation in their inaugural season in the second division. He then had a short stint as manager of Hamburger SV in 2018, before moving to Belgian football where he coached Mouscron and Sint-Truiden between 2019 and 2023.

== Playing career ==
Hollerbach started his career playing football for ASV Rimpar. In 1988, he joined Würzburger Kickers, where he contributed significantly to their promotion to the Bayernliga in 1990. His noteworthy performances attracted attention, leading to a mid-season transfer to FC St. Pauli in the Bundesliga. Despite being unable to prevent relegation, Hollerbach remained a key figure in the 2. Bundesliga for four years. In the 1994–95 season, he played a pivotal role in St. Pauli's promotion to the Bundesliga but opted to join 1. FC Kaiserslautern. Following a brief stint, he made a move to Hamburger SV in early 1996, where he continued to play in the Bundesliga until 2004 and secured the DFL-Ligapokal in 2003.

Hollerbach gained a reputation as a resilient left-back, earning the moniker "Holleraxt" (Holler-axe). His robust style of play resulted in consistently accumulating over ten yellow cards almost every season. Throughout his Bundesliga career, he received a total of 93 yellow cards, three yellow-red cards, and three red cards. Only Stefan Effenberg and David Jarolím received more bookings, albeit with significantly more appearances.

== Managerial career ==
=== VfL 93 Hamburg and VfB Lübeck ===
Following his extensive eight-year tenure with Hamburger SV, Hollerbach transitioned into coaching, beginning with a role at VfL 93 Hamburg in 2005. Subsequently, on 1 July 2006, he assumed the position of head coach at VfB Lübeck in the Regionalliga Nord. However, his tenure was cut short on 28 February 2007, after two consecutive defeats raised doubts about their promotion aspirations, leading to his dismissal.

=== Assistant coach to Felix Magath ===
In June 2007, Hollerbach assumed the role of assistant coach alongside Felix Magath at Bundesliga club VfL Wolfsburg. In a dual capacity, he also took charge of the reserve team competing in the Regionalliga Nord in July 2008, before leaving the position to Lorenz-Günther Köstner from January 2009. Under his coaching influence, VfL Wolfsburg clinched the Bundesliga title at the end of the 2008–09 season.

For the 2009–10 season, Hollerbach, still in collaboration with Felix Magath, moved to Schalke 04 as an assistant coach, maintaining this role until March 2011. However, following Felix Magath's dismissal on 16 March 2011, Hollerbach, along with his coaching colleague Werner Leuthard, terminated their contracts with Schalke 04 a day later. Subsequently, on 18 March 2011, they reunited with Felix Magath at VfL Wolfsburg. Hollerbach voluntarily departed the club on 25 October 2012, following Magath's dismissal.

=== Würzburger Kickers ===
At the start of the 2014–15 season, Hollerbach took on the role of head coach for his hometown club, Würzburger Kickers. On 31 May 2015, he secured promotion to the 3. Liga following a decisive win over 1. FC Saarbrücken. A year later, on 24 May 2016, Hollerbach marked another notable milestone by guiding Würzburger Kickers to promotion to the 2. Bundesliga through a play-off victory against MSV Duisburg. However, in the aftermath of the team facing direct relegation from the second tier, Hollerbach tendered his resignation as head coach on 22 May 2017.

=== Hamburger SV ===
On 22 January 2018, Hollerbach assumed the managerial position for Bundesliga club Hamburger SV, positioned at 17th place with 15 points after the nineteenth matchday of the 2017–18 season. He signed a contract until 30 June 2019. Following a winless streak of 17 games in his final stretch with Würzburger Kickers, Hollerbach faced a similar fate with Hamburger SV, failing to secure a victory in any of his seven matches in charge (three draws, four losses), thereby establishing a new negative record in German professional football.

On 12 March 2018, merely seven weeks after his appointment, Hollerbach was relieved of his duties as HSV found themselves in 17th place, trailing seven points behind the relegation play-off spot, with eight matchdays remaining in the season. Christian Titz succeeded him as head coach. The club suffered its first relegation to the 2. Bundesliga at the end of the season.

=== Mouscron and Sint-Truiden ===
Ahead of the 2019–20 season, Hollerbach assumed the managerial role at Belgian top-flight club Mouscron, succeeding Bernd Storck. His contract, extending until 30 June 2021, marked a new chapter in his coaching career. Unfortunately, Hollerbach faced a setback as illness forced his absence from the end of January 2020. Philippe Saint-Jean, the head of the academy, temporarily assumed managerial responsibilities until the end of the preliminary round in the 2019–20 season. Hollerbach resumed his duties on 25 February 2020. Under his guidance, Mouscron achieved a 10th-place finish in the table, as the season was prematurely concluded after 29 matchdays due to the COVID-19 pandemic.

Despite securing the license for the 2020–21 season through the intervention of the Belgian Court of Arbitration for Sport, Mouscron encountered financial constraints, resulting in a reduction of Hollerbach's salary. On 10 June 2020, an agreement was reached between the club and Hollerbach to terminate his still-valid contract for another year.

The 2020–21 season saw Hollerbach without employment. However, for the 2021–22 season, he returned to coaching, taking on the role of head coach at Sint-Truiden upon their return to the top division. The team finished the season in ninth place, narrowly missing out on the UEFA Europa Conference League play-offs due to a less favorable goal difference.

In December 2022, Hollerbach announced his impending departure from Sint-Truiden at the end of the season, as the club finished in 13th place at the end of the season.

=== Hansa Rostock ===
In May 2024, he was named the new manager of Hansa Rostock, starting with the 2024–25 season. He was sacked in October 2024.

== Career statistics ==
=== Manager ===
As of match played 23 April 2023

Managerial record by team and tenure
Team	From	To	Record					Ref.
Team	From	To	P	W	D	L	Win %	Ref.
VfL 93 Hamburg	1 July 2005	31 May 2006	34	18	10	6	52.94	
VfB Lübeck	1 July 2006	28 February 2007	24	11	3	10	45.83	
VfL Wolfsburg II	1 July 2008	31 December 2008	17	7	4	6	41.18	
Würzburger Kickers	1 July 2014	30 June 2017	122	58	38	26	47.54	
Hamburger SV	22 January 2018	12 March 2018	7	0	3	4	0.00	
Mouscron	1 July 2019	10 June 2020	24	8	9	7	33.33	
Sint-Truiden	1 July 2021	30 June 2023	67	26	14	27	38.81	
Total			295	128	81	86	43.39	—

== Honours ==
Hamburger SV

  - DFB-Ligapokal: 2003
