= 2022–23 KAS Eupen season =

K.A.S. Eupen
2022–23 season
- Owner: Aspire Zone Foundation
- President: Mishal bin Khalifa bin Nasser Al-Thani
- Manager: Bernd Storck (until 23 October); Edward Still (from 24 November)
- Stadium: Kehrwegstadion
- Belgian Pro League: 15th
- Belgian Cup: Sixth round
- Top goalscorer: League: Konan N'Dri (7); All: Konan N'Dri (7)
- Biggest defeat: Club Brugge 7–0 Eupen
Home colours	Away colours	Third colours

The 2022–23 K.A.S. Eupen season was the club's 78th season in existence and the seventh consecutive season in the top flight of Belgian football. In addition to the domestic league, Eupen participated in this season's edition of the Belgian Cup. The season covered the period from 1 July 2022 to 30 June 2023.

== Players ==
=== First-team squad ===
As of 1 February 2023

Note: Flags indicate national team as defined under FIFA eligibility rules; some limited exceptions apply. Players may hold more than one non-FIFA nationality.

No.	Pos.	Nation	Player
1	GK	GER	Lennart Moser
2	DF	BEL	Yentl Van Genechten
3	DF	AUS	Jason Davidson
4	DF	RUS	Oleksandr Filin
5	DF	TOG	Loïc Bessilé (on loan from Charleroi)
6	MF	BEL	Brandon Baiye
7	MF	GHA	Isaac Nuhu
8	MF	BEL	Stef Peeters
9	FW	BIH	Smail Prevljak
10	FW	GRN	Regan Charles-Cook
11	FW	CIV	Konan N'Dri
13	FW	ESP	Davo
14	MF	BEL	Jérôme Déom
15	MF	BEL	Gary Magnée
17	MF	FRA	Nathan Bitumazala
18	MF	GUI	Amadou Keita

No.	Pos.	Nation	Player
19	MF	MLI	Sibiry Keita
20	MF	JAM	Tyreek Magee
23	MF	WAL	Isaac Christie-Davies
24	MF	GHA	Mubarak Wakaso (on loan from Shenzhen)
25	FW	FRA	Djeidi Gassama (on loan from PSG)
27	DF	GUI	Ibrahim Diakité (on loan from Reims)
28	DF	BEL	Rune Paeshuyse
29	DF	FRA	Teddy Alloh
30	DF	SLO	Jan Gorenc
31	GK	HAI	Garissone Innocent
33	GK	GHA	Abdul Manaf Nurudeen
35	DF	BEL	Boris Lambert
44	GK	GER	Julian Renner
47	FW	BEL	Lorenzo Offermann
77	MF	BEL	Dario Oger
99	GK	BEL	Tom Roufosse

=== Out on loan ===
Note: Flags indicate national team as defined under FIFA eligibility rules; some limited exceptions apply. Players may hold more than one non-FIFA nationality.

No.	Pos.	Nation	Player
21	DF	CZE	Jan Král (at Jablonec until 30 June 2023)

== Transfers ==
=== In ===
Pos	Player	Transferred from	Fee	Date	Source
DF	(Slovenia) Jan Gorenc	(Slovenia) Mura	Undisclosed	23 May 2022	
DF	Rune Paeshuyse	Mechelen	Undisclosed	24 May 2022	
FW	(Germany) Nazif Tchadjei	(Germany) Alemannia Aachen	Free	3 June 2022	
MF	(Wales) Isaac Christie-Davies	(England) Barnsley	Free	8 June 2022	
MF	(Grenada) Regan Charles-Cook	(Scotland) Ross County	Free	8 June 2022	
GK	(Germany) Lennart Moser	(Germany) Union Berlin	Undisclosed	18 June 2022	
DF	(Australia) Jason Davidson	(Australia) Melbourne Victory	Undisclosed	22 June 2022	
DF	(Czech Republic) Jan Král	(Czech Republic) Hradec Králové	Undisclosed	24 June 2022	
DF	Yentl Van Genechten	Genk	Undisclosed	28 June 2022	
MF	(France) Nathan Bitumazala	(France) Paris Saint-Germain	Undisclosed	17 August 2022	
FW	(Senegal) Sambou Soumano	(France) Lorient	Loan	20 August 2022	
GK	(France) Garissone Innocent	(France) Paris Saint-Germain	Undisclosed	1 September 2022	
MF	(Ghana) Mubarak Wakaso	(China) Shenzhen	Loan	2 September 2022	
MF	(France) Djeidi Gassama	(France) Paris Saint-Germain	Loan	6 September 2022	
MF	Marciano Aziz	(Iceland) Afturelding	End of loan	30 September 2022	
DF	(Guinea) Ibrahim Diakité	(France) Reims	Loan	12 January 2023	
MF	Brandon Baiye	(France) Clermont Foot	Undisclosed	23 January 2023	
DF	(Togo) Loïc Bessilé	Charleroi	Loan	31 January 2023	
DF	(Russia) Oleksandr Filin	(Russia) Khimki	Free	31 January 2023	
FW	(Spain) Davo	(Poland) Wisła Płock	Free	1 February 2023	

=== Out ===
Pos	Player	Transferred to	Fee	Date	Source
DF	(Germany) Andreas Beck	Unattached	End of contract	3 June 2022	
DF	(Ivory Coast) Silas Gnaka	(Germany) Magdeburg	Undisclosed	6 June 2022	
FW	(Ivory Coast) Mamadou Koné	Deinze	Free	7 June 2022	
DF	(Ivory Coast) Emmanuel Agbadou	(France) Reims	Undisclosed	16 June 2022	
FW	(Portugal) Leonardo Rocha	Lierse	Undisclosed	16 June 2022	
DF	Jonathan Heris	RWDM	Free	21 June 2022	
FW	(Guinea-Bissau) Carlos Embaló	(Italy) Cittadella	Undisclosed	24 June 2022	
FW	Julien Ngoy	Mechelen	Free	4 July 2022	
MF	Marciano Aziz	(Iceland) Afturelding	Loan	7 July 2022	
DF	(France) Benoît Poulain	(France) Nîmes	Free	14 July 2022	
MF	Jens Cools	(Saudi Arabia) Al-Riyadh	Free	26 July 2022	
MF	Marciano Aziz	(Iceland) HK Kópavogs	Undisclosed	13 January 2023	
FW	(Senegal) Sambou Soumano	(France) Lorient	End of loan	18 January 2023	
DF	(Czech Republic) Jan Král	(Czech Republic) Jablonec	Loan	19 January 2023	
MF	(Australia) James Jeggo	(Scotland) Hibernian	Undisclosed	21 January 2023	
MF	(Cameroon) Pierre Akono	(Spain) Alcoyano	Free	25 January 2023	

== Pre-season and friendlies ==
Win Draw Loss

26 June 2022	Eupen (Belgium)	4–1	(Germany) Köln U-21	Eupen, Belgium
	Prevljak 6', 34'; Nuhu 26'; N'Dri 65'	Report	85'	Stadium: Kehrwegstadion

2 July 2022	Eupen (Belgium)	4–1	(Germany) Alemannia Aachen	Eupen, Belgium
	Prevljak 31' (pen.); Magnée 37'; Oger 75'; N'Dri 87'	Report	Mause 28'	Stadium: Kehrwegstadion

9 July 2022	Kaiserslautern (Germany)	4–1	(Belgium) Eupen	Pirmasens, Germany
	Wunderlich 60'; Lobinger 64', 67'; Redondo 87'	Report	Offerman 85'	Stadium: Sportpark Husterhöhe; Attendance: 2,223

15 July 2022	Ajax (Netherlands)	1–1	(Belgium) Eupen	Duivendrecht, Netherlands
	Kudus 85'	Report	Prevljak 48'	Stadium: Sportpark De Toekomst; Attendance: 0 (Behind closed doors); Referee: Robin Gansner (Netherlands)

17 October 2022	Qatar	v	(Belgium) Eupen	Marbella, Spain
18:30		Source		Stadium: Estadio Municipal de Marbella; Attendance: 0 (Behind closed doors)

3 December 2022	Sint-Truiden (Belgium)	3–1	(Belgium) Eupen	Sint-Truiden, Belgium
11:00	Teixeira 23'; Bruno 72', 87'	Report	N'Dri 80'	Stadium: Stayen

== Competitions ==
=== Overview ===
Competition	First match	Last match	Starting round	Final position	Record							
Competition	First match	Last match	Starting round	Final position	Pld	W	D	L	GF	GA	GD	Win %
Pro League	23 July 2022	23 April 2023	Matchday 1	15th	34	7	7	20	40	75	−35	20.59
Belgian Cup	8 November 2022	8 November	Sixth round	Sixth round	1	0	0	1	0	3	−3	0.00
Total					35	7	7	21	40	78	−38	20.00

Source: Soccerway

=== Pro League ===
==== League table ====
Pos	Team	Pld	W	D	L	GF	GA	GD	Pts	Qualification or relegation
13	Mechelen	34	11	7	16	49	63	−14	40	
14	Kortrijk	34	8	7	19	37	61	−24	31	
15	Eupen	34	7	7	20	40	75	−35	28	
16	Oostende (R)	34	7	6	21	37	76	−39	27	Relegation to Challenger Pro League
17	Zulte Waregem (R)	34	6	9	19	50	78	−28	27	Relegation to Challenger Pro League

Source: Jupiler Pro League (in Dutch), Soccerway
Rules for classification: 1) Points; 2) Matches won; 3) Goal difference; 4) Goals scored; 5) Away matches won; 6) Away goal difference; 7) Away goals scored; 8) Play-off.
(R) Relegated

==== Results summary ====
Overall								Home						Away					
Pld	W	D	L	GF	GA	GD	Pts	W	D	L	GF	GA	GD	W	D	L	GF	GA	GD
34	7	7	20	40	75	−35	28	4	4	9	22	33	−11	3	3	11	18	42	−24

Last updated: 23 April 2023.
Source: Jupiler Pro League

==== Results by round ====
Round	1	2	3	4	5	6	7	8	9	10	11	12	13	14	15	16	17	18	19	20	21	23	22	24	25	26	27	28	29	30	31	32	33	34
Ground	A	H	A	H	H	A	H	A	H	A	H	A	H	A	A	H	A	A	H	H	A	A	H	H	H	A	H	A	H	A	H	A	H	A
Result	L	W	L	L	L	W	L	L	L	W	L	L	W	L	L	W	D	W	L	L	D	L	D	D	W	L	D	L	D	L	L	D	L	L
Position	13	10	15	16	18	14	15	15	15	15	16	17	14	15	15	15	15	13	14	14	15	15	15	14	14	15	15	15	14	15	15	15	15	15

Updated to match(es) played on 23 April 2023. Source: Jupiler Pro League
A = Away; H = Home; W = Win; D = Draw; L = Loss

==== Matches ====
The league fixtures were announced on 22 June 2022.

23 July 2022 1	Charleroi	3–1	Eupen	Charleroi
16:00 CEST	Zaroury 18'; Bessilé 50'; Gholizadeh 90+4'	Report	N'Dri 76'	Stadium: Stade du Pays de Charleroi; Referee: Bram Van Driessche

31 July 2022 2	Eupen	2–1	Club Brugge	Eupen
16:00 CEST	Magnée 1'; Prevljak 19'	Report	Jutglà 7'	Stadium: Kehrwegstadion; Referee: Kevin Van Damme

6 August 2022 3	Genk	4–2	Eupen	Genk
16:00 CEST	Paintsil 3', 8'; Hrošovský 37'; Ndayishimiye 90+2'	Report	Prevljak 32'; Charles-Cook 59'	Stadium: Cegeka Arena; Attendance: 12,324; Referee: Alexandre Boucaut

14 August 2022 4	Eupen	0–1	Antwerp	Eupen
16:00 CEST		Report	Lambert 78' (o.g.)	Stadium: Kehrwegstadion; Referee: Jan Boterberg

19 August 2022 5	Eupen	1–3	Seraing	Eupen
20:45 CEST	Magnée 60'	Report	Mouandilmadji 5' (pen.), 36'; Bernier 39'	Stadium: Kehrwegstadion; Referee: Arthur Denil

28 August 2022 6	Westerlo	0–1	Eupen	Westerlo
21:00 CEST		Report	Nuhu 84'	Stadium: Het Kuipje; Referee: Lawrence Visser

3 September 2022 7	Eupen	0–1	Kortrijk	Eupen
18:15 CEST		Report	Mbayo 81'	Stadium: Kehrwegstadion; Referee: Bert Put

10 September 2022 8	Oostende	1–0	Eupen	Ostend
18:15 CEST	Bätzner 51'	Report		Stadium: Diaz Arena; Referee: Nathan Verboomen

18 September 2022 9	Eupen	1–2	Union SG	Eupen
16:00 CEST	Lambert 18'	Report	Adingra 8'; Boniface 90+2'	Stadium: Kehrwegstadion; Referee: Nicolas Laforge

2 October 2022 10	Sint-Truiden	0–1	Eupen	Sint-Truiden
21:00 CEST		Report	N'Dri 76'	Stadium: Stayen; Referee: Lawrence Visser

9 October 2022 11	Eupen	0–4	Gent	Eupen
16:00 CEST		Report	Torunarigha 26' (pen.); Depoitre 40'; Hong 50', 64'	Stadium: Kehrwegstadion; Referee: Brent Staessens

15 October 2022 12	Cercle Brugge	5–1	Eupen	Bruges
18:15 CEST	Denkey 25', 77', 86'; Somers 30'; Ueda 39'	Report	Peeters 44' (pen.)	Stadium: Jan Breydel Stadium; Referee: Erik Lambrechts

18 October 2022 13	Eupen	4–2	OH Leuven	Eupen
18:30 CEST	Charles-Cook 24'; Peeters 45+3' (pen.); Magnée 75'; N'Dri 86'	Report	González 8', 27' (pen.)	Stadium: Kehrwegstadion; Referee: Bram Van Driessche

22 October 2022 14	Mechelen	2–1	Eupen	Mechelen
18:15 CEST	Da Cruz 22'; Ngoy 76' (pen.)	Report	N'Dri 16'	Stadium: Achter de Kazerne; Referee: Jonathan Lardot

30 October 2022 15	Anderlecht	4–2	Eupen	Anderlecht
13:30 CEST	Amuzu 14'; Refaelov 19', 65'; Ait El Hadj 87'	Report	Hoedt 44' (o.g.); Peeters 68'	Stadium: Lotto Park; Referee: Jan Boterberg

5 November 2022 16	Eupen	2–0	Standard Liège	Eupen
20:45 CEST	Peeters 78' (pen.); Gassama 90+1'	Report		Stadium: Kehrwegstadion; Referee: Wesli De Cremer

12 November 2022 17	Zulte Waregem	5–5	Eupen	Waregem
18:15 CEST	Gano 39', 45+3' (pen.); Braem 83'; Offor 84'; Fadera 88'	Report	N'Dri 9'; Charles-Cook 20'; Nuhu 41'; Lambert 56'; Soumano 90+4'	Stadium: Elindus Arena; Referee: Nathan Verboomen

23 December 2022 18	Seraing	0–1	Eupen	Seraing
18:30 CEST		Report	Charles-Cook 88'	Stadium: Stade du Pairay; Referee: Jasper Vergoote

7 January 2023 19	Eupen	1–2	Charleroi	Eupen
16:00 CEST	Lambert 42'	Report	Nkuba 55'; Marcq 88'	Stadium: Kehrwegstadion; Referee: Alexandre Boucaut

14 January 2023 20	Eupen	0–2	Sint-Truiden	Eupen
18:15 CEST		Report	Bruno 44'; Davidson 68' (o.g.)	Stadium: Kehrwegstadion; Referee: Lawrence Visser

17 January 2023 21	OH Leuven	1–1	Eupen	Heverlee
18:30 CEST	Þorsteinsson 28'	Report	Prevljak 90+2' (pen.)	Stadium: Den Dreef; Referee: Erik Lambrechts

27 January 2023 23	Standard Liège	3–1	Eupen	Liège
20:45 CEST	Balikwisha 31'; Zinckernagel 35'; Perica 59'	Report	Charles-Cook 11'	Stadium: Stade Maurice Dufrasne; Referee: Nathan Verboomen

1 February 2023 22	Eupen	1–1	Genk	Eupen
18:45 CEST	Peeters 26' (pen.)	Report	Paintsil 17'	Stadium: Kehrwegstadion; Referee: Bert Put
Note: The match was postponed due to heavy snowfall.

4 February 2023 24	Eupen	1–1	Westerlo	Eupen
18:15 CEST	Peeters 68' (pen.)	Report	Nene 44'	Stadium: Kehrwegstadion; Referee: Arthur Denil

10 February 2023 25	Eupen	2–1	Mechelen	Eupen
20:45 CEST	N'Dri 86'; Baiye 90+1'	Report	Verstraete 10'	Stadium: Kehrwegstadion; Referee: Erik Lambrechts

18 February 2023 26	Antwerp	2–0	Eupen	Antwerp
16:00 CEST	Janssen 38' (pen.); Ekkelenkamp 44'	Report		Stadium: Bosuilstadion; Referee: Wim Smet

25 February 2023 27	Eupen	2–2	Cercle Brugge	Eupen
18:15 CEST	Peeters 10' (pen.); N'Dri 28'	Report	Francis 13'; Ueda 39'	Stadium: Kehrwegstadion; Referee: Bram Van Driessche

5 March 2023 28	Union SG	2–1	Eupen	Brussels
19:15 CEST	Adingra 14'; Vertessen 52'	Report	Prevljak 90+5'	Stadium: Joseph Marien Stadium; Referee: Arthur Denil

11 March 2023 29	Eupen	4–4	Oostende	Eupen
18:15 CEST	Gassama 45+3'; Prevljak 59'; Lambert 76'; Charles-Cook 84'	Report	Ambrose 13' (pen.); Ndicka 56'; Hornby 61'; Rodin 90+7'	Stadium: Kehrwegstadion; Referee: Lothar D'hondt

19 March 2023 30	Gent	3–0	Eupen	Ghent
19:15 CEST	Cuypers 45+1'; Davidson 77' (o.g.); Okumu 85'	Report		Stadium: Ghelamco Arena; Referee: Lawrence Visser

2 April 2023 31	Eupen	0–1	Anderlecht	Eupen
16:00 CEST		Report	Raman 50'	Stadium: Kehrwegstadion; Referee: Lothar D'hondt

8 April 2023 32	Kortrijk	0–0	Eupen	Kortrijk
16:00 CEST		Report		Stadium: Guldensporen Stadion; Referee: Jonathan Lardot

15 April 2023 33	Eupen	1–5	Zulte Waregem	Eupen
16:00 CEST	Prevljak 46'	Report	Fila 5'; Gano 28', 39', 45+2'; Vormer 79'	Stadium: Kehrwegstadion; Referee: Jasper Vergoote

23 April 2023 34	Club Brugge	7–0	Eupen	Bruges
18:30 CEST	Rits 23', 61'; Jutglà 30', 65', 90+1'; Vanaken 35'; Lang 42'	Report		Stadium: Jan Breydel Stadium; Referee: Jan Boterberg

=== Belgian Cup ===
8 November 2022 Sixth round	Deinze	3–0	Eupen	Deinze
20:00 CET	De Belder 38'; Quintero 43'; Balaj 90'	Report		Stadium: Dakota Arena; Referee: Klass Clerkx
