= 2023–24 KAS Eupen season =

K.A.S. Eupen
2023–24 season
- Owner: Aspire Zone Foundation
- President: Mishal bin Khalifa bin Nasser Al-Thani
- Manager: Florian Kohfeldt (until 16 March); Kristoffer Andersen (caretaker, from 25 March)
- Stadium: Kehrwegstadion
- Belgian Pro League: 14th
- Relegation play-offs: 4th (relegated)
- Belgian Cup: Seventh round
- Top goalscorer: League: Regan Charles-Cook; Isaac Nuhu (4 each); All: Regan Charles-Cook; Isaac Nuhu (4 each)
- Highest home attendance: 4,364 vs Club Brugge
- Lowest home attendance: 2,351 vs OH Leuven
- Biggest win: Kortrijk 1–3 Eupen
- Biggest defeat: Eupen 0–5 Club Brugge
Away colours
- All statistics correct as of 17 September 2023.

The 2023–24 season is K.A.S. Eupen's 79th season in existence and eighth consecutive in the Belgian Pro League. They will also compete in the Belgian Cup. Florian Kohfeldt will embark on his debut season as the head coach.

== Players ==
=== First-team squad ===
As of 10 August 2023

Note: Flags indicate national team as defined under FIFA eligibility rules; some limited exceptions apply. Players may hold more than one non-FIFA nationality.

No.	Pos.	Nation	Player
1	GK	GER	Lennart Moser
2	DF	BEL	Yentl Van Genechten
3	DF	AUS	Jason Davidson
4	MF	ISL	Victor Pálsson
6	MF	BEL	Brandon Baiye
7	MF	GHA	Isaac Nuhu
8	MF	GER	Kevin Möhwald
10	FW	GRN	Regan Charles-Cook
13	FW	ESP	Davo
14	MF	BEL	Jérôme Déom
15	DF	BEL	Gary Magnée
17	MF	FRA	Nathan Bitumazala
18	MF	GUI	Amadou Keita
19	FW	POL	Bartosz Białek (on loan from Wolfsburg)

No.	Pos.	Nation	Player
21	DF	CZE	Jan Kral
23	MF	WAL	Isaac Christie-Davies
24	GK	USA	Gabriel Slonina (on loan from Chelsea)
25	DF	RUS	Aleksandr Filin
28	DF	BEL	Rune Paeshuyse
29	DF	FRA	Teddy Alloh
30	DF	SLO	Jan Gorenc
31	GK	HAI	Garissone Innocent
33	GK	GHA	Abdul Manaf Nurudeen
35	DF	BEL	Boris Lambert
44	GK	GER	Julian Renner
77	MF	BEL	Dario Oger
99	GK	BEL	Tom Roufosse

== Transfers ==
=== In ===
Pos.	Player	Transferred from	Fee	Date	Source
MF	(Germany) Kevin Möhwald	(Germany) Union Berlin	€580,000	1 July 2023	
FW	(Poland) Bartosz Białek	(Germany) VfL Wolfsburg	Loan	12 July 2023	
GK	(United States) Gabriel Slonina	(England) Chelsea	Loan	10 August 2023	
FW	(Iceland) Alfreð Finnbogason	(Denmark) Lyngby	Undisclosed	18 August 2023	
MF	(Serbia) Miloš Pantović	(Germany) Union Berlin	Undisclosed	28 August 2023	

=== Out ===
Pos.	Player	Transferred to	Fee	Date	Source
FW	(Bosnia and Herzegovina) Smail Prevljak	(Germany) Hertha BSC	Free	1 July 2023	
MF	(Spain) Davo	(Spain) Deportivo La Coruña	Loan	18 July 2023	
FW	(Ivory Coast) Konan N'Dri	(Belgium) OH Leuven	€1,300,000	21 July 2023	

== Pre-season and friendlies ==
Win Draw Loss Fixtures

24 June 2023 Friendly	Eupen (Belgium)	0–1	(Belgium) RFC Liège	Eupen
16:00 UTC+2		Report	Bruggeman 85'	Stadium: Kehrwegstadion

30 June 2023 Friendly	Alemannia Aachen (Germany)	3–1	(Belgium) Eupen	Düren-Arnoldsweiler
17:00 UTC+2	Heinze 24'; Scepanik 48'; Rexhepaj 100'		Di Matteo 115'
Note: Four periods of 30 minutes.

8 July 2023 Friendly	Eupen (Belgium)	4–0	(Belgium) Charleroi	Eupen
14:00 UTC+2	Davidson 24'; N'Dri 65'; Nuhu 69'; Youndje 73'			Stadium: Kehrwegstadion

15 July 2023 Friendly	Reims (France)	2–3	(Belgium) Eupen	Reims
10:30 UTC+2	Diakité 34' (pen.); Toure 61'		Möhwald 9'; Lambert 85'; Nuhu 88'	Stadium: Centre de vie Raymond-Kopa

22 July 2023 Friendly	Eupen (Belgium)	1–0	(France) Marseille	Harsewinkel, Germany
12:00 UTC+2	Baiye 15'			Stadium: Sportanlage Klosterpforte

13 January 2024 Friendly	Schalke 04 (Germany)	3–1	(Belgium) Eupen	Gelsenkirchen
13:30	Terodde 6', 62'; Idrizi 19'		Finnbogason 69'	Stadium: Veltins-Arena

== Competitions ==
=== Overall record ===
Competition	First match	Last match	Starting round	Final position	Record							
Competition	First match	Last match	Starting round	Final position	Pld	W	D	L	GF	GA	GD	Win %
Belgian Pro League	29 July 2023	26 May 2024	Matchday 1		30	7	3	20	24	58	−34	23.33
Relegation play-offs	7 April 2024	11 May 2024	Matchday 1	4th	6	1	1	4	5	8	−3	16.67
Belgian Cup	31 October 2023		Seventh round	Seventh round	1	0	0	1	0	2	−2	0.00
Total					37	8	4	25	29	68	−39	21.62

Last updated: 11 May 2024
Source: Soccerway

=== Belgian Pro League ===
==== League table ====
Pos	Team	Pld	W	D	L	GF	GA	GD	Pts	Qualification or relegation
12	OH Leuven	30	7	8	15	34	47	−13	29	Qualification for the Europe play-offs
13	Charleroi	30	7	8	15	26	48	−22	29	Qualification for the relegation play-offs
14	Eupen	30	7	3	20	24	58	−34	24	Qualification for the relegation play-offs
15	Kortrijk	30	6	6	18	22	57	−35	24	Qualification for the relegation play-offs
16	RWD Molenbeek	30	5	8	17	31	67	−36	23	Qualification for the relegation play-offs

Source: Jupiler Pro League (in Dutch), Soccerway
Rules for classification: 1) Points; 2) Matches won; 3) Goal difference; 4) Goals scored; 5) Away matches won; 6) Away goal difference; 7) Away goals scored; 8) Play-off.

==== Results summary ====
Overall								Home						Away					
Pld	W	D	L	GF	GA	GD	Pts	W	D	L	GF	GA	GD	W	D	L	GF	GA	GD
16	4	3	9	19	33	−14	15	2	2	4	11	18	−7	2	1	5	8	15	−7

Last updated: 11 November 2023.
Source: Worldfootball

==== Results by round ====
Round	1	2	3	4	5	6	7	8	9	10	11	12	13	14	15	16
Ground	H	A	H	A	H	A	H	A	H	A	A	H	A	H	A	H
Result	D	W	L	W	W	L	L	L	L	L	L	W	D	L	L	D
Position	7	4	9	8	4	7	10	11	11	12	14	10	10	12	13	13

Updated to match(es) played on 11 November 2023. Source: Worldfootball
A = Away; H = Home; W = Win; D = Draw; L = Loss

==== Matches ====
The league fixtures were unveiled on 22 June 2023.

29 July 2023 1	Eupen	2–2	Westerlo	Eupen
16:00 CEST (UTC+2)	Van Genechten 20', 55'; Nurudeen (yellow card) 77'	Report	Madsen 69' (pen.); Bos (yellow card) 82'; Stassin 90+1'	Stadium: Kehrwegstadion; Attendance: 2,864; Referee: Kevin Van Damme

5 August 2023 2	Genk	0–1	Eupen	Genk
16:00 CEST (UTC+2)	McKenzie (yellow card) 50'	Report	Charles-Cook 2'; Nuhu (yellow card) 33'; Nurudeen (yellow card) 75'	Stadium: Cegeka Arena; Attendance: 14,493; Referee: Wim Smet

13 August 2023 3	Eupen	0–5	Club Brugge	Eupen
16:00 CEST (UTC+2)		Report	Olsen 6' (pen.), 62'; Zinckernagel 17', 66'; Buchanan 29'; Mechele (yellow card) 59'; Yaremchuk (yellow card) 90+1'	Stadium: Kehrwegstadion; Attendance: 4,364; Referee: Lothar D'hondt

20 August 2023 4	Kortrijk	1–3	Eupen	Kortrijk
19:15 CEST (UTC+2)	Wasinski (yellow card) 49'; Audoor (yellow card) 54'; Malinov (yellow card) 65'; Kadri 66'; João Silva (yellow card) 80'; Mehssatou (yellow card) 90+2'; Avenatti (red card) 90+9'	Report	Paeshuyse (yellow card) 53'; Magnée 56'; Keita 60', (yellow card) 67'; Král (yellow card) 90+5'; Slonina (yellow card) 90+9'; Déom 90+11'	Stadium: Guldensporen Stadion; Attendance: 4,419; Referee: Arthur Denil

26 August 2023 5	Eupen	3–1	OH Leuven	Eupen
18:15 CEST (UTC+2)	Magnée 24' (pen.); Nuhu 50'; Charles-Cook 87'; Davidson (yellow card) 90+3'	Report	Banzuzi (yellow card) 32'; Schrijvers 81' (pen.); Nsingi (yellow card) 82'	Stadium: Kehrwegstadion; Attendance: 2,351; Referee: Nicolas Laforge

2 September 2023 6	Mechelen	1–0	Eupen	Mechelen
18:15 CEST (UTC+2)	Lauberbach 81'	Report	Lambert (yellow card) 85'	Stadium: AFAS Stadion; Attendance: 13,056; Referee: Bert Put

17 September 2023 7	Eupen	1–3	Standard Liège	Eupen
13:30 CEST (UTC+2)	Finnbogason 80'; Christie-Davies (yellow card) 88'	Report	Hayden (yellow card) 22'; Alzate (yellow card) 43' (yellow-red card) 90+13'; Kanga 45+3'; Kawabe 45+5', (yellow card) 58'; Sowah 75'	Stadium: Kehrwegstadion; Referee: Jonathan Lardot

24 September 2023 8	Gent	2–1	Eupen	Ghent
19:15 CEST (UTC+2)	Kums (penalty missed) 49', 49'; Tissoudali 58'	Report	Pantović 28'	Stadium: Ghelamco Arena; Referee: Jan Boterberg

30 September 2023 9	Eupen	1–3	Anderlecht	Eupen
16:00 CET (UTC+1)	Nuhu 38'		Dreyer 1'; Vázquez 67', 88'	Stadium: Kehrwegstadion

8 October 2023 10	Antwerp	4–1	Eupen	Antwerp
16:00 CEST (UTC+2)				Stadium: Bosuilstadion

20 October 2023 11	Union Saint-Gilloise	4–1	Eupen	Brussels
20:45 CEST (UTC+2)				Stadium: Joseph Marien Stadium

28 October 2023 12	Eupen	2–0	Charleroi	Eupen
18:15 CEST (UTC+2)	Král 45'; Möhwald 54'	Report		Stadium: Kehrwegstadion; Referee: Jasper Vergoote

3 November 2023 13	Sint-Truiden	1–1	Eupen	Sint-Truiden
20:45 CET (UTC+1)	Paeshuyse 20' (o.g.)	Report	Pantović 90+4'	Stadium: Stayen; Referee: Nathan Verboomen

11 November 2023 14	Eupen	1–3	RWD Molenbeek	Eupen
18:15 CET (UTC+1)	Nuhu 30'	Report	Mercier 35'; Abe 66'; Del Piage 87'	Stadium: Kehrwegstadion; Referee: Bert Put

25 November 2023 15	Cercle Brugge	2–0	Eupen	Bruges
16:00 CET (UTC+1)				Stadium: Jan Breydel Stadium

2 December 2023 16	Eupen	1–1	Kortrijk	Eupen
--:-- CET (UTC+1)				Stadium: Kehrwegstadion

10 December 2023 17	Eupen	1–3	Genk	Eupen
--:-- CET (UTC+1)				Stadium: Kehrwegstadion

==== Results summary ====
Overall								Home						Away					
Pld	W	D	L	GF	GA	GD	Pts	W	D	L	GF	GA	GD	W	D	L	GF	GA	GD
0	0	0	0	0	0	0	0	0	0	0	0	0	0	0	0	0	0	0	0

Last updated: April 2024.

==== Results by round ====
Round	1	2	3	4	5	6
Ground	H	A	A	H	A	H
Result	D	L	L	L	L	W
Position						

Updated to match(es) played on April 2024. Source:
A = Away; H = Home; W = Win; D = Draw; L = Loss

==== Matches ====
7 April 2024 1	Eupen	1–1	Kortrijk	Eupen
16:00 CEST (UTC+2)				Stadium: Kehrwegstadion

13 April 2024 2	RWDM	3–1	Eupen	Molenbeek-Saint-Jean
16:00 CEST (UTC+2)				Stadium: Edmond Machtens Stadium

21 April 2024 3	Charleroi	1–0	Eupen	Charleroi
19:15				Stadium: Stade du Pays de Charleroi

26 April 2024 4	Eupen	1–2	Charleroi	Eupen
20:45 CEST (UTC+2)				Stadium: Kehrwegstadion

5 May 2024 5	Kortrijk	1–0	Eupen	Kortrijk
19:15 CEST (UTC+2)				Stadium: Guldensporen Stadion

11 May 2024 6	Eupen	2–0	RWDM	Eupen
18:15 CEST (UTC+2)				Stadium: Kehrwegstadion

=== Belgian Cup ===
31 October 2023 Seventh round	Eupen	0–2	Oostende	Eupen
18:30 CET (UTC+1)			Pérez 3'; Berte 78'	Stadium: Kehrwegstadion

== Statistics ==
=== Appearances and goals ===
No.	Pos	Nat	Player	Total		Belgian Pro League		Belgian Cup	
No.	Pos	Nat	Player	Apps	Goals	Apps	Goals	Apps	Goals
Goalkeepers
1	GK	(Germany) GER	Lennart Moser	0	0	0	0	0	0
24	GK	(United States) USA	Gabriel Slonina	2	0	2	0	0	0
31	GK	(Haiti) HAI	Garissone Innocent	0	0	0	0	0	0
33	GK	(Ghana) GHA	Abdul Manaf Nurudeen	2	0	2	0	0	0
44	GK	(Germany) GER	Julian Renner	0	0	0	0	0	0
99	GK	(Belgium) BEL	Tom Roufosse	0	0	0	0	0	0
Defenders
2	DF	(Belgium) BEL	Yentl Van Genechten	4	2	4	2	0	0
3	DF	(Australia) AUS	Jason Davidson	4	0	4	0	0	0
4	DF	(Iceland) ISL	Victor Pálsson	4	0	4	0	0	0
15	DF	(Belgium) BEL	Gary Magnée	4	1	4	1	0	0
21	DF	(Czech Republic) CZE	Jan Kral	2	0	0+2	0	0	0
25	DF	(Russia) RUS	Oleksandr Filin	0	0	0	0	0	0
28	DF	(Belgium) BEL	Rune Paeshuyse	4	0	4	0	0	0
29	DF	(France) FRA	Teddy Alloh	2	0	0+2	0	0	0
30	DF	(Slovenia) SLO	Jan Gorenc	0	0	0	0	0	0
Midfielders
6	MF	(Belgium) BEL	Brandon Baiye	4	0	4	0	0	0
7	MF	(Ghana) GHA	Isaac Nuhu	4	0	4	0	0	0
8	MF	(Germany) GER	Kevin Möhwald	1	0	1	0	0	0
14	MF	(Belgium) BEL	Jérôme Déom	4	1	2+2	1	0	0
17	MF	(France) FRA	Nathan Bitumazala	0	0	0	0	0	0
18	MF	(Guinea) GUI	Amadou Keita	4	1	1+3	1	0	0
23	MF	(Wales) WAL	Isaac Christie-Davies	2	0	0+2	0	0	0
35	MF	(Belgium) BEL	Boris Lambert	4	0	4	0	0	0
77	MF	(Belgium) BEL	Dario Oger	0	0	0	0	0	0
Forwards
10	FW	(Grenada) GRN	Regan Charles-Cook	4	1	3+1	1	0	0
13	FW	(Spain) ESP	Davo	0	0	0	0	0	0
19	FW	(Poland) POL	Bartosz Białek	0	0	0	0	0	0
27	FW	(Iceland) ISL	Alfreð Finnbogason	1	0	1	0	0	0
