= 2021–22 KAS Eupen season =

Eupen
2021–22 season
- Owner: Aspire Zone Foundation
- Chairman: Mishal bin Khalifa bin Nasser Al-Thani
- Manager: Stefan Krämer
- Stadium: Kehrwegstadion
- Belgian First Division A: 15th
- Belgian Cup: Semi-finals
- Top goalscorer: League: Smail Prevljak (9); All: Smail Prevljak (16)

The 2021–22 season was the 77th season in the existence of K.A.S. Eupen and the club's sixth consecutive season in the top flight of Belgian football. In addition to the domestic league, Eupen participated in this season's edition of the Belgian Cup.

== Players ==
=== First-team squad ===
As of 18 January 2022

Note: Flags indicate national team as defined under FIFA eligibility rules; some limited exceptions apply. Players may hold more than one non-FIFA nationality.

No.	Pos.	Nation	Player
3	DF	FRA	Teddy Alloh (on loan from Paris Saint-Germain)
5	DF	ESP	Jordi Amat
6	DF	FRA	Benoît Poulain
7	FW	BEL	Julien Ngoy
8	MF	BEL	Stef Peeters
9	FW	BIH	Smail Prevljak
10	MF	GRE	Giannis Konstantelias (on loan from PAOK)
11	FW	CIV	Konan N'Dri
13	MF	MLI	Sibiry Keita
14	MF	BEL	Jérôme Déom
15	DF	BEL	Gary Magnée
16	DF	BEL	Simon Libert
17	FW	GBS	Carlos Embaló
18	MF	GUI	Amadou Keita
19	FW	POR	Leandro Rocha
20	MF	JAM	Tyreek Magee

No.	Pos.	Nation	Player
22	DF	CIV	Emmanuel Agbadou
24	DF	CIV	Silas Gnaka
25	DF	GHA	Emmanuel Sowah Adjei
26	MF	BEL	Jens Cools
28	DF	BEL	Jonathan Heris
29	MF	GHA	Isaac Nuhu
30	GK	GER	Robin Himmelmann
31	FW	GER	Torben Müsel (on loan from Mönchengladbach)
32	DF	GER	Andreas Beck
33	GK	GHA	Abdul Nurudeen
35	DF	BEL	Boris Lambert
70	MF	CMR	Pierre Akono
77	FW	CIV	Mamadou Koné
99	GK	BEL	Tom Roufosse
—	MF	AUS	James Jeggo

=== Out on loan ===
Note: Flags indicate national team as defined under FIFA eligibility rules; some limited exceptions apply. Players may hold more than one non-FIFA nationality.

No. / Pos. / Nation / Player; — / GK / BEL / Romain Matthys (at MVV)	No. / Pos. / Nation / Player; — / MF / BEL / Marciano Aziz (at MVV)

== Pre-season and friendlies ==
Win Draw Loss Fixtures

30 June 2021 Friendly	Eupen (Belgium)	2–1	(Belgium) RFC Seraing	Eupen, Belgium
16:00 CEST (UTC+2)				Stadium: Kehrwegstadion

3 July 2021 Friendly	Eupen (Belgium)	1–1	(Germany) 1. FC Saarbrücken	Eupen, Belgium
16:00 CEST (UTC+2)				Stadium: Kehrwegstadion

7 July 2021 Friendly	Racing Genk (Belgium)	2–0	(Belgium) Eupen	Belgium
14:00 CEST (UTC+2)

10 July 2021 Friendly	Eupen (Belgium)	1–0	(Belgium) RWD Molenbeek	Belgium
16:00 CEST (UTC+2)	Ngoy 60'

17 July 2021 Friendly	Eupen (Belgium)	1–1	(Belgium) Sint-Truiden	Belgium
15:00 CEST (UTC+2)	39'		Brüls 89'

2 September 2021 Friendly	Schalke 04 (Germany)	1–5	(Belgium) Eupen	Gelsenkirchen, Germany
15:00 CEST (UTC+2)	Mikhaylov 49'		Nuhu 10', 29', 37'; Keita 44'; N'Dri 47'	Stadium: Training ground Attendance: 0

== Competitions ==
=== Overall record ===
Competition	First match	Last match	Starting round	Final position	Record							
Competition	First match	Last match	Starting round	Final position	Pld	W	D	L	GF	GA	GD	Win %
Belgian First Division A	25 July 2021	10 April 2022	Matchday 1	15th	30	8	8	14	37	61	−24	26.67
Belgian Cup	27 October 2021	3 March 2022	Sixth round	Semi-finals	5	3	1	1	10	8	+2	60.00
Total					35	11	9	15	47	69	−22	31.43

Source: Soccerway

=== First Division A ===
==== League table ====
Pos	Team	Pld	W	D	L	GF	GA	GD	Pts	Qualification or relegation
13	Kortrijk	34	9	10	15	43	48	−5	37	
14	Standard Liège	34	9	9	16	32	51	−19	36	
15	Eupen	34	8	8	18	37	61	−24	32	
16	Zulte Waregem	34	8	8	18	42	69	−27	32	
17	Seraing (O)	34	8	4	22	30	68	−38	28	Qualification for the Relegation play-off

Source: Jupiler Pro League (in Dutch), Soccerway
Rules for classification: 1) Points; 2) Matches won; 3) Goal difference; 4) Goals scored; 5) Away matches won; 6) Away goal difference; 7) Away goals scored; 8) Play-off.
(O) Play-off winners

==== Results summary ====
Overall								Home						Away					
Pld	W	D	L	GF	GA	GD	Pts	W	D	L	GF	GA	GD	W	D	L	GF	GA	GD
34	8	8	18	37	61	−24	32	4	4	9	18	29	−11	4	4	9	19	32	−13

Source: Jupiler Pro League

==== Results by round ====
Round	1	2	3	4	5	6	7	8	9	10	11	12	13	14	15	16	17	18	19	20	21	22	23	24	25	26	27	28	29	30	31	32	33	34
Ground	A	H	A	H	A	H	H	A	A	H	A	H	A	H	A	H	A	H	A	H	A	H	A	H	A	A	H	H	A	H	A	H	A	H
Result	D	D	W	W	W	L	L	W	W	W	L	L	L	D	L	D	L	W	L	L	L	L	D	L	D	L	L	L	D	W	L	D	L	L
Position	8	11	5	4	1	2	6	4	2	1	3	4	8	7	9	8	9	8	10	10	12	12	12	14	15	15	15	15	16	15	16	15	15	15

Source: Jupiler Pro League
A = Away; H = Home; W = Win; D = Draw; L = Loss

==== Matches ====
The league fixtures were announced on 8 June 2021.

25 July 2021 1	Club Brugge	2–2	Eupen	Brugge
20:45 CEST (UTC+2)	Vormer (yellow card) 40'; Dost 56' (pen.); Lang (yellow card) 85'; Pérez (yellow card) 85'; De Ketelaere 90+13'	Report	Heris (yellow card) 34'; Agbadou (yellow card) 55'; Kayembe 60'; Ngoy 77'; Beck (yellow card) 85'; Nuhu (yellow card) 90+3'; Cools (yellow card) 90+4'; Déom (yellow card) 90+5'; Prevljak (yellow card) 90+14'	Stadium: Jan Breydel Stadium; Attendance: 10,000; Referee: Bram Van Driessche

31 July 2021 2	Eupen	1–1	Anderlecht	Eupen
20:45 CEST (UTC+2)				Stadium: Kehrwegstadion

7 August 2021 3	Mechelen	1–3	Eupen	Mechelen
18:30 CEST (UTC+2)				Stadium: AFAS Stadion

14 August 2021 4	Eupen	2–1	Sint-Truiden	Eupen
18:30 CEST (UTC+2)				Stadium: Kehrwegstadion

21 August 2021 5	Oud-Heverlee Leuven	1–4	Eupen	Leuven
18:30 CEST (UTC+2)				Stadium: Den Dreef

28 August 2021 6	Eupen	1–2	RFC Seraing	Eupen
18:30 CEST (UTC+2)				Stadium: Kehrwegstadion

11 September 2021 7	Eupen	0–1	Antwerp	Eupen
16:15 CEST (UTC+2)	Prevljak (yellow card) 87'	Report	De Laet (yellow card) 38'; Nainggolan (yellow card) 41'; Miyoshi (yellow card) 42'; Frey 55'; B. Verstraete (yellow card) 68'; Gerkens (yellow card) 80'	Stadium: Kehrwegstadion; Attendance: 2,016; Referee: Kevin Van Damme

17 September 2021 8	Cercle Brugge	1–2	Eupen	Bruges
20:45 CEST (UTC+2)				Stadium: Jan Breydel Stadium

25 September 2021 9	Beerschot	0–3	Eupen	Antwerp
16:15 CEST (UTC+2)				Stadium: Olympic Stadium

3 October 2021 10	Eupen	3–2	Genk	Eupen
21:00 CEST (UTC+2)				Stadium: Kehrwegstadion

17 October 2021 11	Gent	2–0	Eupen	Ghent
21:00 CEST (UTC+2)				Stadium: Ghelamco Arena

23 October 2021 12	Eupen	2–3	Union SG	Eupen
18:30 CEST (UTC+2)	Edo Kayembe 75'; Emmanuel Agbadou 78'; Jordi Amat Maas (yellow card) 90+7'	Report	Deniz Undav 7'; Christian Burgess (yellow card) 21'; Bart Nieuwkoop (yellow card) 23'; Teddy Teuma 29'; Deniz Undav (yellow card) 68'; Casper Nielsen 79'	Stadium: Kehrwegstadion; Attendance: 2,950; Referee: Bram Van Driessche

30 October 2021 13	Charleroi	3–0	Eupen	Charleroi
16:15 CEST (UTC+2)				Stadium: Stade du Pays de Charleroi

6 November 2021 14	Eupen	1–1	Zulte Waregem	Eupen
16:15 CET (UTC+1)	Nuhu 40'		Vossen 35' (pen.)	Stadium: Kehrwegstadion

20 November 2021 15	Standard Liège	1–0	Eupen	Liège
20:45 CET (UTC+1)	Agbadou 45+3'			Stadium: Stade Maurice Dufrasne

27 November 2021 16	Eupen	2–2	Kortrijk	Eupen
18:30 CET (UTC+1)				Stadium: Kehrwegstadion

4 December 2021 17	Oostende	2–1	Eupen	Ostend
18:30 CET (UTC+1)				Stadium: Versluys Arena

11 December 2021 18	Eupen	1–0	Beerschot	Eupen
18:30 CET (UTC+1)				Stadium: Kehrwegstadion

16 December 2021 19	Antwerp	4–2	Eupen	Antwerp
18:45 CET (UTC+1)	Samatta 27'; Benson 40'; Nainggolan 48'; B. Verstraete 90+5'	Report	Keita 44'; Prevljak 77'; Magnée (yellow card) 90+1'	Stadium: Bosuilstadion; Attendance: 8,664; Referee: Alexandre Boucaut

19 December 2021 20	Eupen	0–4	Charleroi	Eupen
16:00 CET (UTC+1)				Stadium: Kehrwegstadion

27 December 2021 21	Sint-Truiden	2–0	Eupen	Sint-Truiden
21:00 CEST (UTC+2)				Stadium: Stayen

16 January 2022 22	Eupen	0–2	Cercle Brugge	Eupen
16:00 CET (UTC+1)				Stadium: Kehrwegstadion

22 January 2022 23	Kortrijk	1–1	Eupen	Kortrijk
16:15 CEST (UTC+2)	Messaoudi 52'		Ngoy 23'	Stadium: Guldensporen Stadion

26 January 2022 24	Eupen	0–2	Standard Liège	Eupen
18:45 CEST (UTC+2)				Stadium: Kehrwegstadion

29 January 2022 25	RFC Seraing	0–0	Eupen	Seraing
18:30 CEST (UTC+2)				Stadium: Stade du Pairay

6 February 2022 26	Anderlecht	4–1	Eupen	Anderlecht
18:30 CET (UTC+1)				Stadium: Constant Vanden Stock Stadium

12 February 2022 27	Eupen	0–1	Gent	Eupen
16:15 CET (UTC+1)				Stadium: Kehrwegstadion

20 February 2022 28	Eupen	1–3	Club Brugge	Eupen
16:00 CET (UTC+1)				Stadium: Kehrwegstadion

26 February 2022 29	Union Saint-Gilloise	0–0	Eupen	Brussels
16:15 CET (UTC+1)				Stadium: Stade Joseph Marien

6 March 2022 30	Eupen	3–1	OH-Leuven	Eupen
21:00 CET (UTC+1)				Stadium: Kehrwegstadion

12 March 2022 31	Zulte Waregem	3–0	Eupen	Waregem
--:-- CET (UTC+1)				Stadium: Regenboogstadion

19 March 2022 32	Eupen	1–1	Mechelen	Eupen
16:15 CET (UTC+1)	Lambert 8'		Schoofs 21'	Stadium: Kehrwegstadion; Referee: Jasper Vergoote

2 April 2022 33	Genk	5–0	Eupen	Genk
--:-- CEST (UTC+2)				Stadium: Luminus Arena

9 April 2022 34	Eupen	0–2	Oostende	Eupen
18:30 CEST (UTC+2)			Ambrose 38'; Albanese 81'	Stadium: Kehrwegstadion; Referee: Brent Staessens

=== Belgian Cup ===
27 October 2021 Sixth round	Dender EH	0–1	Eupen
20:00 CET			Gnaka 7'

1 December 2021 Seventh round	Eupen	3–2 (a.e.t.)	Zulte Waregem	Eupen
18:00 CET	Prevljak 72', 82', 95'		Gano 27', 37'	Stadium: Kehrwegstadion

22 December 2021 Quarter-finals	Mechelen	1–3	Eupen	Mechelen
20:00 CET	De Camargo 23'		Ngoy 55'; Prevljak 83', 90+6'	Stadium: Achter de Kazerne; Referee: Lothar D'Hondt

3 February 2022 Semi-finals; First leg	Eupen	2–2	Anderlecht	Eupen
20:45 CET	Prevljak 16' (pen.); Peeters 78'		Refaelov 6' (pen.), 90+6' (pen.)	Stadium: Kehrwegstadion; Referee: Jonathan Lardot

3 March 2022 Semi-finals; Second leg	Anderlecht	3–1 (5–3 agg.)	Eupen	Anderlecht
20:45 CET	Murillo 5'; Magallán 28'; Kouamé 47'	report	Prevljak 10'	Stadium: Constant Vanden Stock Stadium; Attendance: 20,000; Referee: Nicolas Laforge
