= Garissone Innocent =

French-Haitian footballer (born 2000)

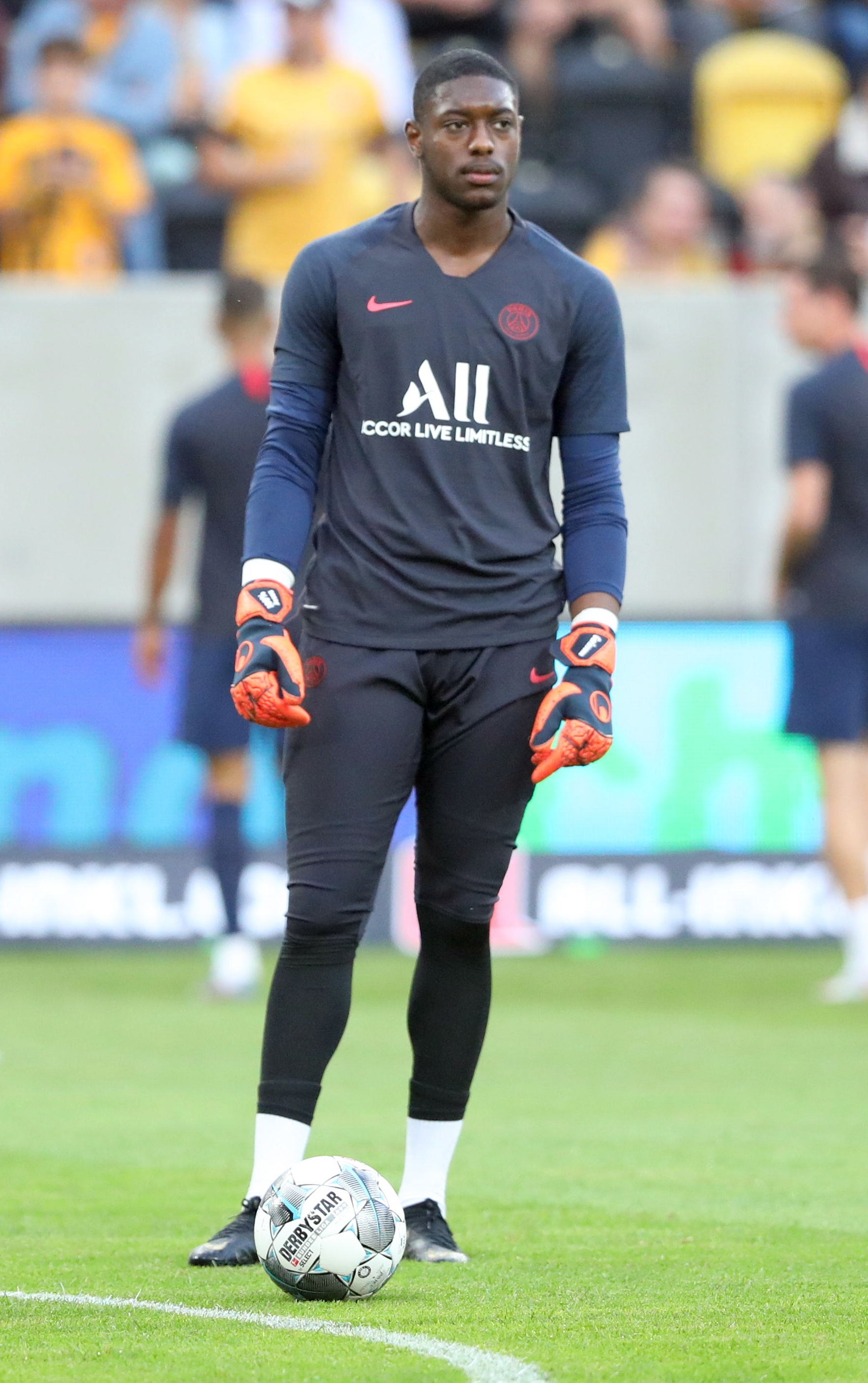
- Innocent with Paris Saint-Germain in 2019

Personal information
- Full name: Garissone Innocent
- Date of birth: 16 April 2000 (age 26)
- Place of birth: Ivry-sur-Seine, France
- Height: 1.92 m (6 ft 4 in)
- Position: Goalkeeper

Youth career
- 2015–2019: Paris Saint-Germain

Senior career*
Years	Team	Apps	(Gls)
2017–2019	Paris Saint-Germain B	3	(0)
2019–2022	Paris Saint-Germain	0	(0)
2020	→ Caen B (loan)	1	(0)
2020–2021	→ Caen (loan)	3	(0)
2021	→ Vannes (loan)	10	(0)
2022–2025	Eupen	0	(0)
2025	Riteriai	10	(0)
2026	Atlético Ottawa	3	(0)

International career^{‡}
2023–	Haiti	2	(0)
- * Club domestic league appearances and goals as of 1 July2026 ‡ National team caps and goals as of 23 May 2025 (UTC)

Garissone Innocent (born 16 April 2000) is a professional footballer who plays as a goalkeeper. Born in France, he plays for the Haiti national team.

== Club career ==
=== Paris Saint-Germain ===
Innocent joined Paris Saint-Germain (PSG) in 2015, and signed his first professional contract on 31 May 2018, making him a Parisian player until June 2021.

On 3 October 2019, Innocent signed a two-year contract extension with PSG. He took the role of fourth goalkeeper at Paris Saint-Germain during the 2019–20 season, behind Keylor Navas, Sergio Rico, and Marcin Bułka. The team would go on to win all four domestic competitions and finish runner-up in the UEFA Champions League.

==== 2020–21: Loan to Caen ====
On 2 October 2020, Innocent joined Caen on a season-long loan with a purchase option. He made his professional debut in a 3–2 win against Dunkerque on 18 December.

During a match against Chambly on 30 January 2021, Innocent collapsed on the field. He reportedly suffered a tachycardia attack, and was rushed to the hospital. Caen later confirmed that Innocent had regained consciousness, though manager Pascal Dupraz said that the player still "had trouble speaking and breathing." Innocent would remain under observation at the hospital overnight, with his condition remaining stable. The match eventually resulted in a 4–2 victory for Chambly. Coincidentally in the same match, Chambly's goalkeeper Xavier Pinoteau was also taken to the hospital after taking a blow to the head. Innocent made his return to the bench for Caen in a match against Nancy on 2 March. However, he would not make any more appearances for the club for the rest of the season.

==== 2021–22: Loan to Vannes ====
On 26 July 2021, Innocent joined Championnat National 2 club Vannes on a season-long loan. According to Vannes president Maxime Ray, Innocent joined the club as the starting goalkeeper. He had several complicated games with errors, and in December, the club hierarchy chose to replace him as the starting keeper with Clément Pétrel, relegating Innocent to the bench. "We wanted to keep him as a backup", explained Ray. However, Innocent preferred to return to Paris. He played a total of ten matches during his loan in Brittany.

=== Eupen ===
On 1 September 2022, Innocent left PSG, signing for Belgian Pro League club Eupen on a three-year contract.

=== Riteriai ===
On 20 February 2025, Innocent signed for Lithuanian club Riteriai.

=== Atlético Ottawa ===
On 16 January 2026, Canadian club Atlético Ottawa announced they had signed Innocent to a one-year contract for the 2026 season, with a club option through 2027. In May 2026, he left the club to attend to a personal matter, never returning and ultimately departing the club by a mutual termination of his contract in July.

== International career ==
Born in France, Innocent is of Haitian descent. In February 2021, he was included in the preliminary squad for the Haiti U23 national team that would compete in the CONCACAF Olympic Qualifying Championship. He debuted for the Haiti senior team on 29 March 2023, coming on as a substitute in a match against Bermuda in the 2022–23 CONCACAF Nations League B.

== Career statistics ==
=== Club ===
As of match played 4 May 2025

Appearances and goals by club, season and competition
Club	Season	League			Cup		Other		Total	
Club	Season	Division	Apps	Goals	Apps	Goals	Apps	Goals	Apps	Goals
Paris Saint-Germain B	2018–19	Championnat National 2	3	0	—		—		3	0
Caen B (loan)	2020–21	Championnat National 2	1	0	—		—		1	0
Caen (loan)	2020–21	Ligue 2	3	0	0	0	—		3	0
Vannes (loan)	2021–22	Championnat National 2	10	0	0	0	0	0	10	0
Eupen	2022–23	Belgian Pro League	0	0	0	0	0	0	0	0
Eupen	2023–24	Belgian Pro League	0	0	0	0	0	0	0	0
Eupen	Total		0	0	0	0	0	0	0	0
Riteriai	2025	A Lyga	10	0	1	0	—		11	0
Career total			27	0	1	0	0	0	28	0

=== International ===
As of match played 14 October 2024

Appearances and goals by national team and year
National team	Year	Apps	Goals
Haiti	2024	1	0
Haiti	2025	1	0
Total		2	0
