= Teddy Alloh =

French footballer (born 2002)

Personal information
- Date of birth: 23 January 2002 (age 24)
- Place of birth: Paris, France
- Height: 1.76 m (5 ft 9 in)
- Position: Left-back

Team information
- Current team: Penafiel
- Number: 75

Youth career
- 2008–2015: Paris FC
- 2015–2021: Paris Saint-Germain

Senior career*
Years	Team	Apps	(Gls)
2021	Paris Saint-Germain B	2	(0)
2021–2022	Paris Saint-Germain	0	(0)
2022	→ Eupen (loan)	12	(0)
2022–2025	Eupen	39	(1)
2025–	Penafiel	13	(0)
- * Club domestic league appearances and goals as of 20 June 2026

Teddy Alloh (born 23 January 2002) is a French professional footballer who plays as a left-back for Liga Portugal 2 club Penafiel.

== Career ==
A former youth academy player of Paris FC, Alloh joined Paris Saint-Germain (PSG) in 2015. He signed his first professional contract on 29 June 2020, tying him to the club until June 2023. On 14 July 2021, he made his first appearance for the senior team in a 4–0 friendly win over Le Mans.

On 20 January 2022, Alloh joined Belgian club Eupen on loan until the end of the season. On 6 September 2022, he signed a three-year contract with Eupen until June 2025.

On 6 August 2025, Alloh joined Portuguese club Penafiel.

== Personal life ==
Born in France, Alloh is of Ivorian descent.

== Career statistics ==
As of 1 July 2022

Appearances and goals by club, season, and competition
Club	Season	League			Cup		Other		Total	
Club	Season	Division	Apps	Goals	Apps	Goals	Apps	Goals	Apps	Goals
Paris Saint-Germain B	2021–22	Championnat National 3	2	0	—		—		2	0
Eupen (loan)	2021–22	Belgian First Division A	12	0	2	0	—		14	0
Eupen	2022–23	Belgian Pro League	10	0	1	0	—		11	0
Eupen	2023–24	Belgian Pro League	6	0	0	0	—		6	0
Eupen	Total		16	0	1	0	—		17	0
Career total			30	0	3	0	—		33	0
