= Isaac Christie-Davies =

Welsh footballer (born 1997)

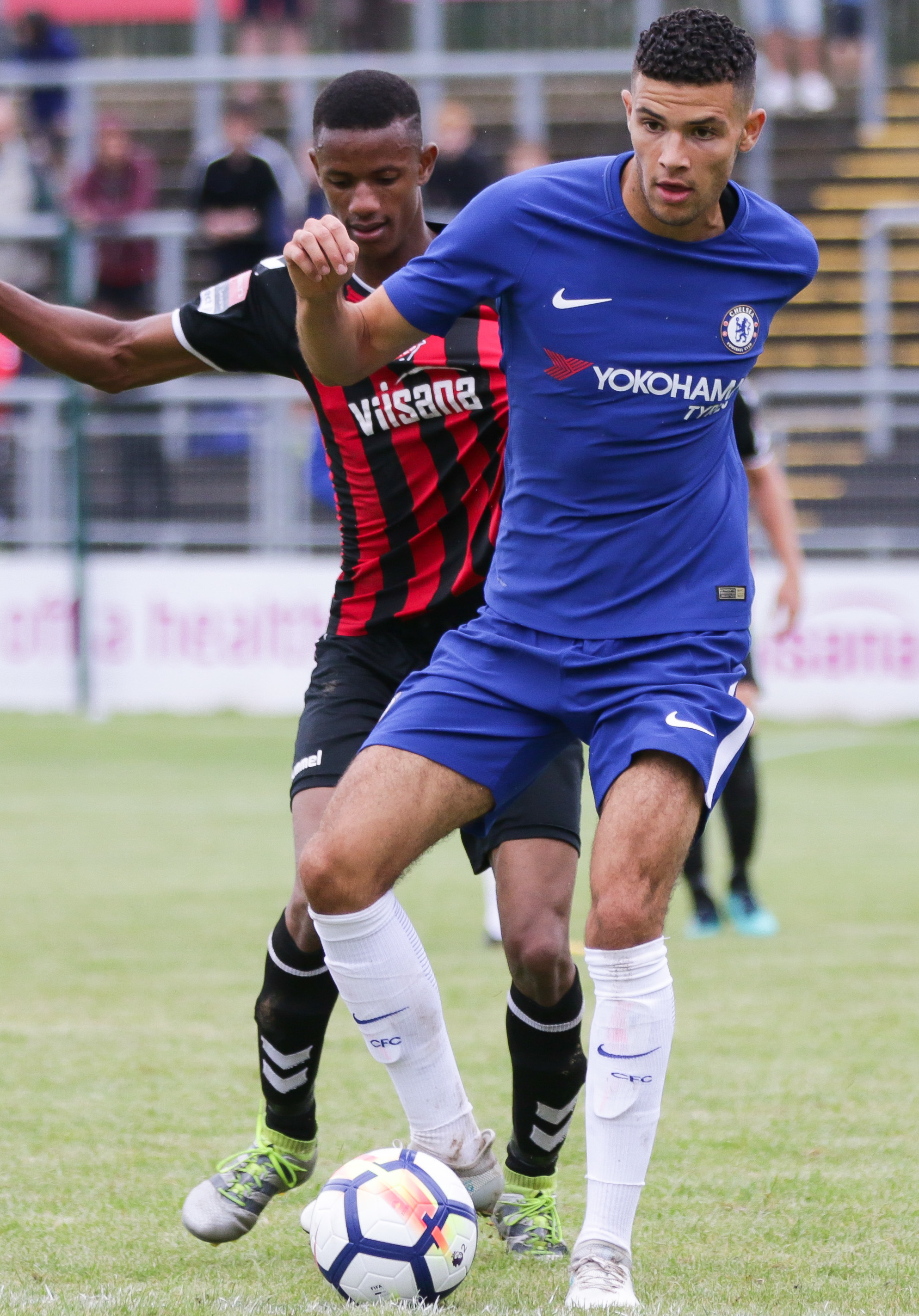
- Christie-Davies (right) with Chelsea in 2017

Personal information
- Full name: Isaac David Christie-Davies
- Date of birth: 18 October 1997 (age 29)
- Place of birth: Brighton, England
- Height: 6 ft 2 in (1.88 m)
- Position: Midfielder

Team information
- Current team: Marsaxlokk
- Number: 7

Youth career
- 2014–2018: Chelsea
- 2018–2019: Liverpool

Senior career*
Years	Team	Apps	(Gls)
2019–2020	Liverpool	0	(0)
2020	→ Cercle Brugge (loan)	0	(0)
2020–2022	Barnsley	2	(0)
2021	→ Dunajská Streda (loan)	9	(0)
2022–2024	Eupen	39	(0)
2025	Wealdstone	0	(0)
2026–	Marsaxlokk	10	(0)

International career
2013	England U16	3	(0)
2017	England U17	3	(0)
2018	Wales U21	2	(0)
- * Club domestic league appearances and goals as of 7 May 2026

Isaac David Christie-Davies (born 18 October 1997) is a professional footballer who plays as a midfielder for Marsaxlokk. Born in England, he has represented both England and Wales at youth international level.

== Career ==
Christie-Davies began his career with Chelsea, before moving to Liverpool in July 2018. He made his professional debut on 17 December 2019, starting in Liverpool's away match against Aston Villa in the quarter-finals of the EFL Cup. He was loaned out for the second half of the 2019–2020 season at Belgian side Cercle Brugge and scored in his first appearance, a friendly against FC Augsburg, however he failed to make a competitive appearance for the club. He was released by Liverpool at the end of the 2019–20 season.

Christie-Davies signed a three-year contract with Barnsley on 7 September 2020. On 29 January 2021, he joined Slovak Super Liga side Dunajská Streda on loan until the end of the season.

On 8 June 2022, Christie-Davies joined Belgian First Division A side Eupen on a free transfer, signing a two-year deal.

Christie-Davies left Eupen in 2024, and after more than a year without a club, he joined the Professional Footballers' Association training camp in the summer of 2025.

In November 2025, Christie-Davies joined National League club Wealdstone. He made a single appearance in the National League Cup before departing the club the following month.

On 1 February 2026, Christie-Davies signed for Maltese Premier League side Marsaxlokk.

== Career statistics ==
=== Club ===
As of match played 25 November 2025

Appearances and goals by club, season and competition
Club	Season	League			National cup (Note: Includes FA Cup, Slovak Cup, Belgian Cup)		League cup (Note: Includes EFL Cup)		Other		Total	
Club	Season	Division	Apps	Goals	Apps	Goals	Apps	Goals	Apps	Goals	Apps	Goals
Chelsea U21	2016–17 EFL Trophy		—		—		—		1 (Note: Appearances in EFL Trophy)	0	1	0
Chelsea U21	2017–18 EFL Trophy		—		—		—		4	0	4	0
Chelsea U21	Total		—		—		—		5	0	5	0
Liverpool U21	2019–20 EFL Trophy		—		—		—		2	0	2	0
Liverpool	2018–19	Premier League	0	0	0	0	0	0	0	0	0	0
Liverpool	2019–20	Premier League	0	0	0	0	1	0	0	0	1	0
Liverpool	Total		0	0	0	0	1	0	0	0	1	0
Cercle Brugge (loan)	2019–20	Belgian Pro League	0	0	0	0	–		–		0	0
Barnsley	2020–21	Championship	0	0	0	0	0	0	–		0	0
Barnsley	2021–22	Championship	2	0	0	0	0	0	–		2	0
Barnsley	Total		2	0	0	0	0	0	–		2	0
DAC 1904 (loan)	2020–21	Slovak First Football League	9	0	1	0	–		–		10	0
Eupen	2022–23	Belgian Pro League	24	0	1	0	–		–		25	0
Eupen	2023–24	Belgian Pro League	15	0	1	0	–		–		16	0
Eupen	Total		39	0	2	0	–		–		41	0
Wealdstone	2025–26	National League	0	0	0	0	–		1 (Note: Appearance in National League Cup)	0	1	0
Career total			50	0	3	0	1	0	8	0	62	0
