= Emmanuel Agbadou =

Ivorian footballer (born 1997)

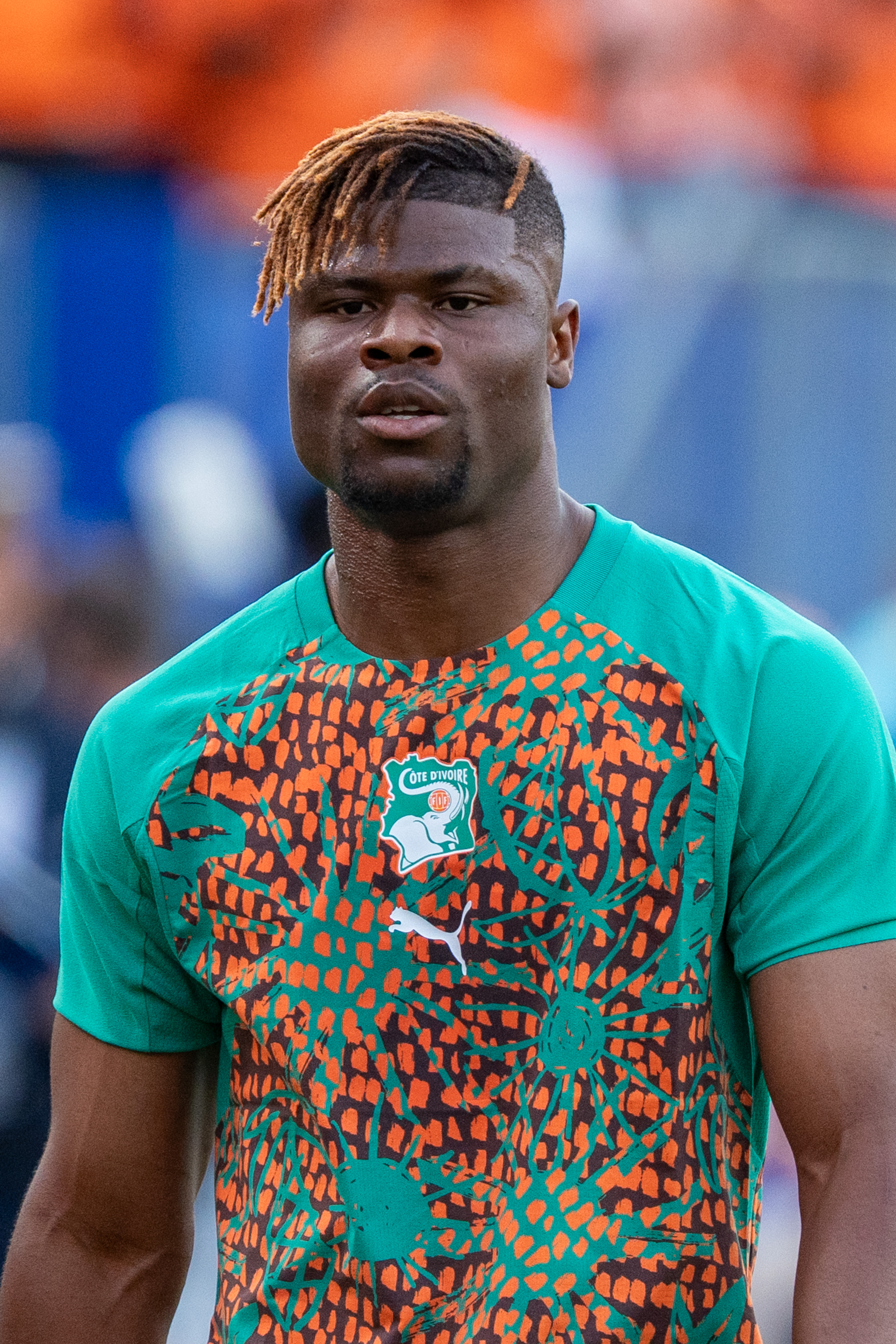
- Agbadou with the Ivory Coast in 2026

Personal information
- Full name: Badobre Emmanuel Elysee Djedje Agbadou
- Date of birth: 17 June 1997 (age 29)
- Place of birth: Abidjan, Ivory Coast
- Height: 1.92 m (6 ft 4 in)
- Position: Centre-back

Team information
- Current team: Beşiktaş
- Number: 12

Youth career
- –2019: San Pédro

Senior career*
Years	Team	Apps	(Gls)
2019–2020	Monastir	18	(1)
2020–2022	Eupen	56	(6)
2022–2025	Reims	75	(1)
2025–2026	Wolverhampton Wanderers	30	(1)
2026–	Beşiktaş	25	(1)

International career^{‡}
2022–	Ivory Coast	27	(2)
- * Club domestic league appearances and goals as of 22 November 2026 ‡ National team caps and goals as of 12 November 2026

Badobre Emmanuel Elysee Djedje Agbadou (born 17 June 1997) is an Ivorian professional footballer who plays as a centre-back for Süper Lig club Beşiktaş and the Ivory Coast national team.

== Club career ==
=== Monastir ===
In July 2019, Agbadou signed for US Monastir. On 25 September 2019, he played his first match against Stade Tunisien in a 1–0 win.

=== Eupen ===
On 1 September 2020, Agbadou left Tunisia's Monastir and joined Belgium's Eupen. He made his debut for Eupen on 30 October 2020 against Genk, in a match that ended in a 4–0 defeat.

Agbadou established himself as a first-choice defender from his first season, adapting to Belgian football. During the 2020–21 season, he made 23 league appearances and scored one goal, while in the 2021–22 season, he scored five goals in 33 league appearances. After delivering consistent performances as a defender, he was named the club's Player of the Season.

On 16 June 2022, Agbadou transferred to France's Reims. Having made 56 competitive appearances and scored six goals for Eupen over two seasons, he moved to Ligue 1 on the back of his performances in Belgian football.

=== Reims ===
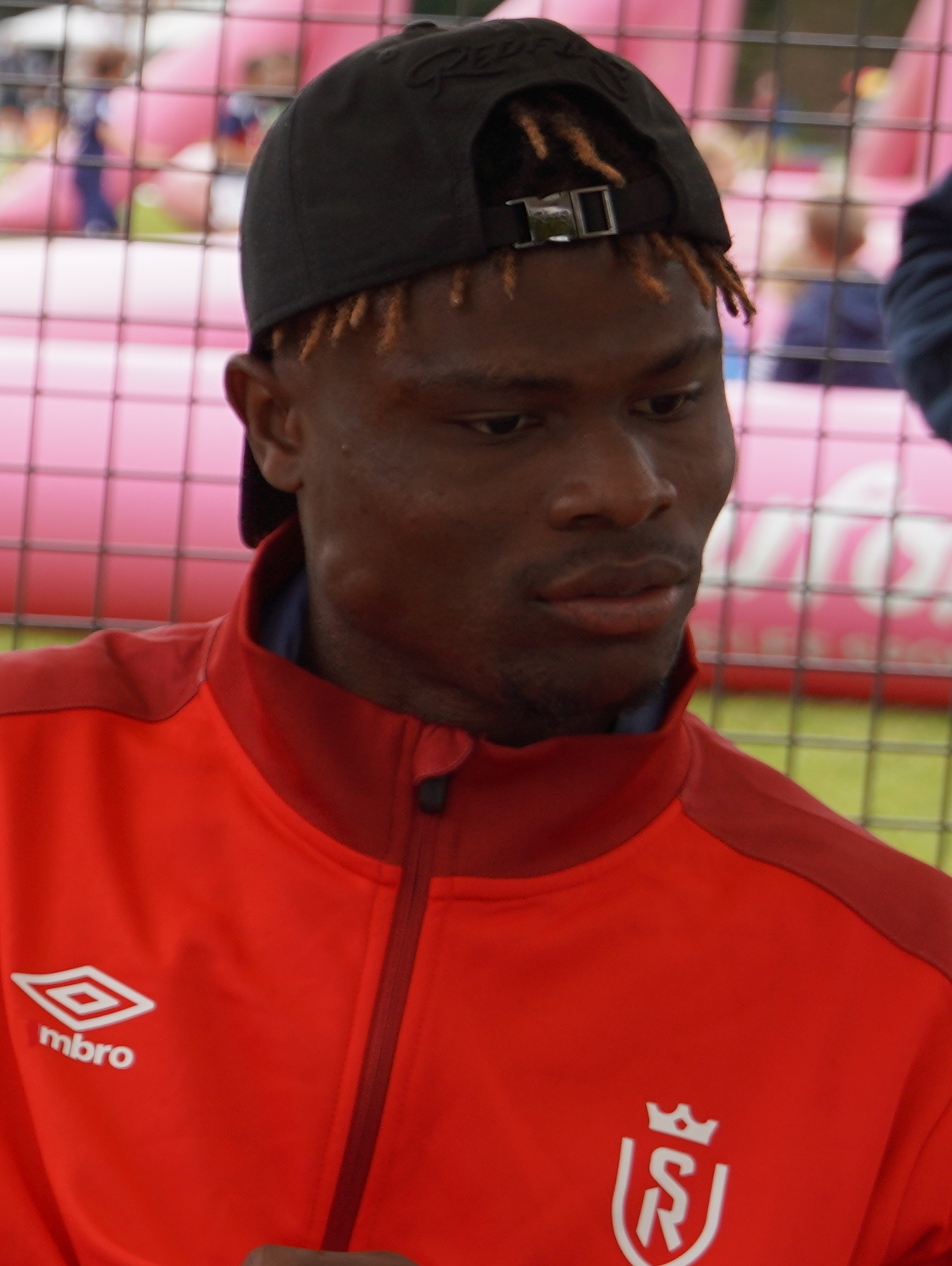
Agbadou with Reims in 2023

On 16 June 2022, Agbadou left Belgium's Eupen and signed a five-year contract with French club Reims. He made his debut for Reims on 7 August 2022, in the opening match of the 2022–23 Ligue 1 season against Olympique de Marseille. He subsequently established himself as a first-choice centre-back, playing an important role in the team's defence with his physical strength and aerial ability.

During the 2023–24 season, Agbadou also scored goals. On 21 January 2024, he scored twice in Reims' Coupe de France round of 32 match against Sochaux. Reims were eliminated after the match ended in a 2–2 draw and they lost in the penalty shoot-out. He also scored one goal in Ligue 1 that season.

On 17 September 2024, Agbadou extended his contract with Reims until 2028. Having made 69 competitive appearances for the club at the time, he had become a key defender and also wore the captain's armband during the 2024–25 season, having previously served as vice-captain.

On 9 January 2025, Agbadou joined Premier League club Wolverhampton Wanderers. Having made 75 competitive appearances for Reims over approximately two and a half years, he moved to English football in recognition of his consistent defensive performances and leadership.

=== Wolverhampton Wanderers ===
On 9 January 2025, Agbadou signed for Premier League club Wolverhampton Wanderers on a four-and-a-half-year deal for a reported fee of £16.6 million.

Agbadou scored his first goal for Wolves in their match against Crystal Palace on 20 May 2025.

On 1 November 2025, Agbadou was shown a straight red card for fouling Josh King in their 3–0 defeat to Fulham and what proved to be Vítor Pereira's last game in charge as the next day he was sacked after his team went 10 games without a win in the new season.

=== Beşiktaş ===
On 6 February 2026, Agbadou joined Beşiktaş on a four-and-a-half-year deal for a reported fee of €18 million. On 8 February, he made his debut for Beşiktaş in a Süper Lig match against Alanyaspor, providing an assist for Oh Hyeon-gyu in a 2–2 draw. On 28 February, he scored his first goal for Beşiktaş in a match against Kocaelispor, securing a 1–0 victory for his team.

== International career ==
Agbadou debuted with the Ivory Coast national team in a friendly 3–0 loss to England on 29 March 2022.

Agbadou scored his first international goal on 19 November 2024 in a 2025 Africa Cup of Nations qualifying match against the Chad. He scored in the 77th minute, assisted by Jean-Philippe Krasso, as Ivory Coast won 4–0.

On 10 October 2025, he scored in the 17th minute of a 2026 FIFA World Cup qualifying match against the Seychelles. Ivory Coast won the match 7–0.

Agbadou was included in the list of Ivorian players selected by coach Emerse Faé to participate in the 2025 Africa Cup of Nations.

On May 15, 2026, Agbadou was integrated by Ivory Coast coach Emerse Faé in his list of 26 players in order to participate in the 2026 World Cup.

== Career statistics ==
=== Club ===
As of match played 19 September 2026

Appearances and goals by club, season and competition
Club	Season	League			National cup (Note: Includes Tunisian Cup, Belgian Cup, Coupe de France, FA Cup, Turkish Cup)		League cup (Note: Includes EFL Cup)		Continental		Total	
Club	Season	Division	Apps	Goals	Apps	Goals	Apps	Goals	Apps	Goals	Apps	Goals
Monastir	2019–20	Ligue Professionnelle 1	18	1	1	0	—		—		19	1
Eupen	2020–21	Belgian Pro League	23	1	3	0	—		—		26	1
Eupen	2021–22	Belgian Pro League	33	5	5	0	—		—		38	5
Eupen	Total		56	6	8	0	—		—		64	6
Reims	2022–23	Ligue 1	29	0	2	0	—		—		31	0
Reims	2023–24	Ligue 1	32	1	2	2	—		—		34	3
Reims	2024–25	Ligue 1	14	0	1	0	—		—		15	0
Reims	Total		75	1	5	2	—		—		80	3
Wolverhampton Wanderers	2024–25	Premier League	16	1	2	0	—		—		18	1
Wolverhampton Wanderers	2025–26	Premier League	14	0	0	0	3	0	—		17	0
Wolverhampton Wanderers	Total		30	1	2	0	3	0	—		35	1
Beşiktaş	2025–26	Süper Lig	13	1	3	0	—		—		16	1
Beşiktaş	2026–27	Süper Lig	5	0	0	0	—		4 (Note: Appearances in UEFA Europa League)	0	9	0
Beşiktaş	Total		18	1	3	0	—		4	0	25	1
Career total			196	10	19	2	3	0	4	0	223	12

=== International ===
As of match played 12 November 2026

Appearances and goals by national team and year
National team	Year	Apps	Goals
Ivory Coast	2022	2	0
Ivory Coast	2023	1	0
Ivory Coast	2024	8	1
Ivory Coast	2025	6	1
Ivory Coast	2026	10	0
Total		27	2

Scores and results list Ivory Coast's tally first.

List of international goals scored by Emmanuel Agbadou
No.	Date	Venue	Opponent	Score	Result	Competition
1.	19 November 2024	Felix Houphouet Boigny Stadium, Abidjan, Ivory Coast	Chad	3–0	4–0	2025 Africa Cup of Nations qualification
2.	10 October 2025	Côte d'Or National Sports Complex, Saint Pierre, Mauritius	Seychelles	2–0	7–0	2026 FIFA World Cup qualification

== Honours ==
Reims

- Coupe de France runner-up: 2024–25
