= Marciano Aziz =

Belgian footballer (born 2001)

Personal information
- Date of birth: 13 July 2001 (age 25)
- Place of birth: Eupen, Belgium
- Height: 1.72 m (5 ft 8 in)
- Position: Midfielder

Team information
- Current team: Grótta

Youth career
- 2006–2020: Eupen

Senior career*
Years	Team	Apps	(Gls)
2020–2023	Eupen	1	(0)
2021–2022	→ MVV (loan)	19	(0)
2022	→ Afturelding (loan)	10	(10)
2023–2025	HK	27	(3)
2025–	Grótta	11	(2)

International career
2018	Belgium U18	4	(1)
- * Club domestic league appearances and goals as of 24 July 2025

Marciano Aziz (born 13 July 2001) is a Belgian professional footballer who plays as a midfielder for Icelandic 2. deild karla club Grótta.

== Club career ==
=== Eupen ===
A youth product of Eupen since the age of 5, Aziz signed his first professional contract with the club on 18 March 2020. He made his professional debut with Eupen in a 4–0 Belgian First Division A loss to Club Brugge on 16 August 2020, coming on as a substitute in the 77th minute for Knowledge Musona.

==== MVV (loan) ====
On 30 July 2021, he joined MVV in the Netherlands on loan.

==== Afturelding (loan) ====
On 7 July 2022, Aziz was loaned to Afturelding in Iceland until 30 September 2022.

=== HK and Grótta ===
On 13 January 2023, Aziz signed a two-year contract with newly promoted Icelandic Besta deild karla club HK.

In March 2025, Aziz signed with recently relegated 2. deild karla club Grótta.
