= Jan Král =

Czech footballer (born 1999)

Personal information
- Date of birth: 5 April 1999 (age 27)
- Place of birth: Česká Lípa, Czech Republic
- Height: 1.91 m (6 ft 3 in)
- Position: Centre-back

Team information
- Current team: Sigma Olomouc
- Number: 21

Youth career
- Mladá Boleslav

Senior career*
Years	Team	Apps	(Gls)
2017–2020	Mladá Boleslav	7	(0)
2017	→ Varnsdorf (loan)	8	(0)
2019	→ Erzgebirge Aue (loan)	3	(0)
2020–2022	Hradec Králové	65	(7)
2022–2024	Eupen	29	(1)
2023	→ FK Jablonec (loan)	14	(0)
2024–	Sigma Olomouc	41	(0)

International career
2015	Czech Republic U16	4	(1)
2015–2016	Czech Republic U17	14	(0)
2016–2017	Czech Republic U18	15	(1)
2017–2018	Czech Republic U19	8	(1)
2018–2019	Czech Republic U20	5	(0)
2019	Czech Republic U21	1	(0)
- * Club domestic league appearances and goals as of 27 May 2026

Jan Král (born 5 April 1999) is a Czech professional footballer who plays as a centre-back for Czech First League club Sigma Olomouc.

== Career ==
He made his senior league debut for Varnsdorf on 30 July 2017 in their Czech National Football League 1–0 home loss against Třinec.

On 24 June 2022, Král signed a three-year contract with Eupen in Belgium. In January 2023, he returned to his native Czech Republic to join FK Jablonec on loan until the end of the season.

On 10 September 2024, Král signed a contract with Sigma Olomouc until summer 2028.

== Career statistics ==
=== Club ===
As of match played 11 May 2024

Appearances and goals by club, season and competition
Club	Season	League			National cup		Continental		Total	
Club	Season	Division	Apps	Goals	Apps	Goals	Apps	Goals	Apps	Goals
Mladá Boleslav	2017-18	Czech First League	0	0	1	0	—		1	0
Mladá Boleslav	2018-19	Czech First League	7	0	1	0	—		8	0
Mladá Boleslav	2019-20	Czech First League	0	0	—		0	0	0	0
Mladá Boleslav	Total		7	0	2	0	0	0	9	0
Varnsdorf (loan)	2017-18	Czech National Football League	8	0	—		—		8	0
Erzgebirge Aue (loan)	2018-19	2. Bundesliga	4	0	—		—		4	0
Hradec Králové	2019-20	Czech National Football League	13	2	—		—		13	2
Hradec Králové	2020-21	Czech National Football League	20	1	1	0	—		21	1
Hradec Králové	2021-22	Czech First League	32	4	3	0	—		35	4
Hradec Králové	Total		65	7	4	0	—		69	7
Eupen	2022-23	Belgian Pro League	7	0	1	0	—		8	0
Eupen	2023-24	Belgian Pro League	26	1	1	0	—		27	1
Eupen	Total		33	1	2	0	—		35	1
FK Jablonec (loan)	2022-23	Czech First League	19	1	—		—		19	1
Career Total			136	9	8	0	0	0	144	9

== Honours ==
Sigma Olomouc

- Czech Cup: 2024–25
