= David Álvarez (footballer, born 1994) =

Spanish footballer

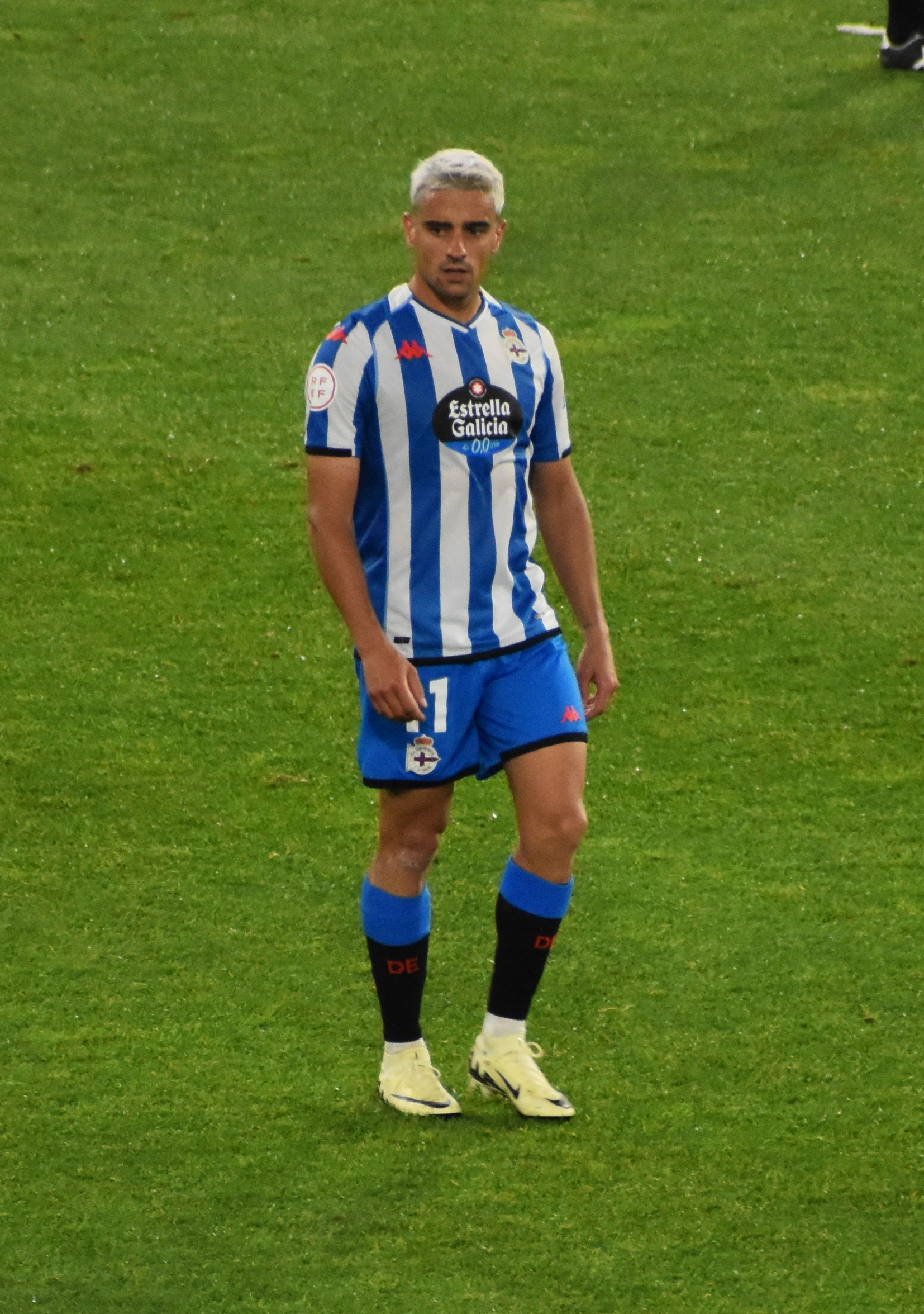
- Álvarez playing for Deportivo La Coruña in 2024

Personal information
- Full name: Antonio David Álvarez Rey
- Date of birth: 18 December 1994 (age 31)
- Place of birth: Luarca, Spain
- Height: 1.78 m (5 ft 10 in)
- Position: Winger

Team information
- Current team: Penafiel
- Number: 37

Youth career
- Luarca
- Avilés
- 2012–2013: Oviedo

Senior career*
Years	Team	Apps	(Gls)
2012	Avilés B	3	(1)
2013	Oviedo B	4	(0)
2013–2014	Langreo	19	(5)
2014–2015	Caudal	36	(9)
2015–2016	Zamora	37	(13)
2016–2017	Oviedo B	37	(16)
2017–2018	Rápido Bouzas	13	(1)
2018	Cerceda	15	(0)
2018–2019	Zamora	35	(20)
2019–2020	Langreo	27	(13)
2020–2022	Ibiza	60	(12)
2022–2023	Wisła Płock	18	(9)
2023–2024	Eupen	7	(0)
2023–2024	→ Deportivo La Coruña (loan)	37	(8)
2024–2025	Deportivo La Coruña	9	(0)
2025	→ Murcia (loan)	15	(0)
2025–	Penafiel	39	(5)
- * Club domestic league appearances and goals as of 16 September 2026

Antonio David Álvarez Rey (born 18 December 1994), sometimes known as Davo, is a Spanish professional footballer who plays for Liga Portugal 2 club Penafiel. Mainly a right winger, he can also play as a forward.

== Club career ==
Born in Luarca, Asturias, Álvarez represented Luarca CF and Real Avilés CF as a youth. He made his senior debut with the latter's reserves on 26 February 2012, starting in a 0–2 Regional Preferente home loss against Valdesoto CF, and scored his first goal on 22 April in a 4–1 away routing of AD Universidad de Oviedo B.

In the 2012 summer, Álvarez moved to Real Oviedo and returned to the youth setup. He then featured rarely with the B-team in Tercera División before signing for fellow league team UP Langreo on 8 October 2013.

Álvarez subsequently represented fourth division sides Caudal Deportivo, Zamora CF and Oviedo B before joining Segunda División B side Rápido de Bouzas in July 2017. He moved to fellow third division side CCD Cerceda the following January, but returned to Zamora in July 2018 after suffering relegation.

On 3 July 2019, after scoring a career-best 20 goals, Álvarez returned to Langreo, with the club now in division three. On 13 May 2020, he agreed to a deal with UD Ibiza in the same category, and was the club's top goalscorer with ten goals during the campaign, as they achieved a first-ever promotion to Segunda División.

Álvarez made his professional debut at the age of 26 on 13 August 2021, coming on as a second-half substitute for Ekain Zenitagoia in a 0–0 away draw against Real Zaragoza. On 3 June 2022, he signed a two-year contract with an extension option for Polish Ekstraklasa side Wisła Płock.

After a successful stint in Poland, with nine goals and three assists in 18 league appearances, Álvarez was transferred to Belgian side KAS Eupen on 31 January 2023. On 18 July, however, he returned to Spain after being loaned to Primera Federación side Deportivo de La Coruña for one year.

Regularly used as Dépor achieved promotion to the second division, Álvarez signed a permanent two-year contract with the club on 19 June 2024. On 3 February of the following year, he moved to Real Murcia CF on loan.

On 2 August 2025, Álvarez terminated his link with Deportivo.
