= Pierre Akono =

Cameroonian footballer

Personal information
- Full name: Pierre Ramses Pe Akono
- Date of birth: 29 June 2000 (age 26)
- Height: 1.82 m (6 ft 0 in)
- Position: Midfielder

Youth career
- –2019: Eding Sport
- 2019–2021: Eupen

Senior career*
Years	Team	Apps	(Gls)
2019–2023	Eupen	0	(0)
2023	Alcoyano	9	(0)
2023–2024	Dibba Al-Hisn		
2024–2025	Al Bidda	2	(0)

International career^{‡}
2019–	Cameroon	1	(0)
- * Club domestic league appearances and goals as of 14 May 2023 ‡ National team caps and goals as of 20:44, 15 December 2019 (UTC)

Pierre Ramses Pe Akono (born 29 June 2000) is a Cameroonian professional footballer who plays as a midfielder.

== Career statistics ==
=== International ===
As of matches played 15 December 2019.

National team	Year	Apps	Goals
Cameroon	2019	1	0
Total		1	0
