= Sibiry Keita =

Malian footballer (born 2001)

Personal information
- Date of birth: January 30, 2001 (age 25)
- Place of birth: Mali
- Height: 1.73 m (5 ft 8 in)
- Position: Midfielder

Team information
- Current team: Milsami Orhei
- Number: 27

Youth career
- 2014–2019: Aspire Academy

Senior career*
Years	Team	Apps	(Gls)
2019–2023	Eupen	17	(1)
2023–2025	Slavia Sofia	5	(1)
2025–	Milsami Orhei	28	(6)

International career
2017	Mali U17	2	(1)
- * Club domestic league appearances and goals as of 25 June 2026

Sibiry Keita (born 30 January 2001) is a Malian professional footballer who plays as a midfielder for Moldovan Liga club Milsami Orhei.

== Professional career ==
Keita joined the Aspire Academy in 2014, where he was one of the 3 players out of a pool of 35,200 players who tried out to join. On 31 January 2019, Keita signed a 3-year contract with Eupen. Keita made his professional debut with Eupen in a 1-0 Belgian First Division A loss to K.V.C. Westerlo on 27 April 2019.

== International career ==
Keita represented the Mali U17 for 2017 Africa U-17 Cup of Nations qualification.
