= Ibrahim Diakité =

Guinean footballer (born 2003)

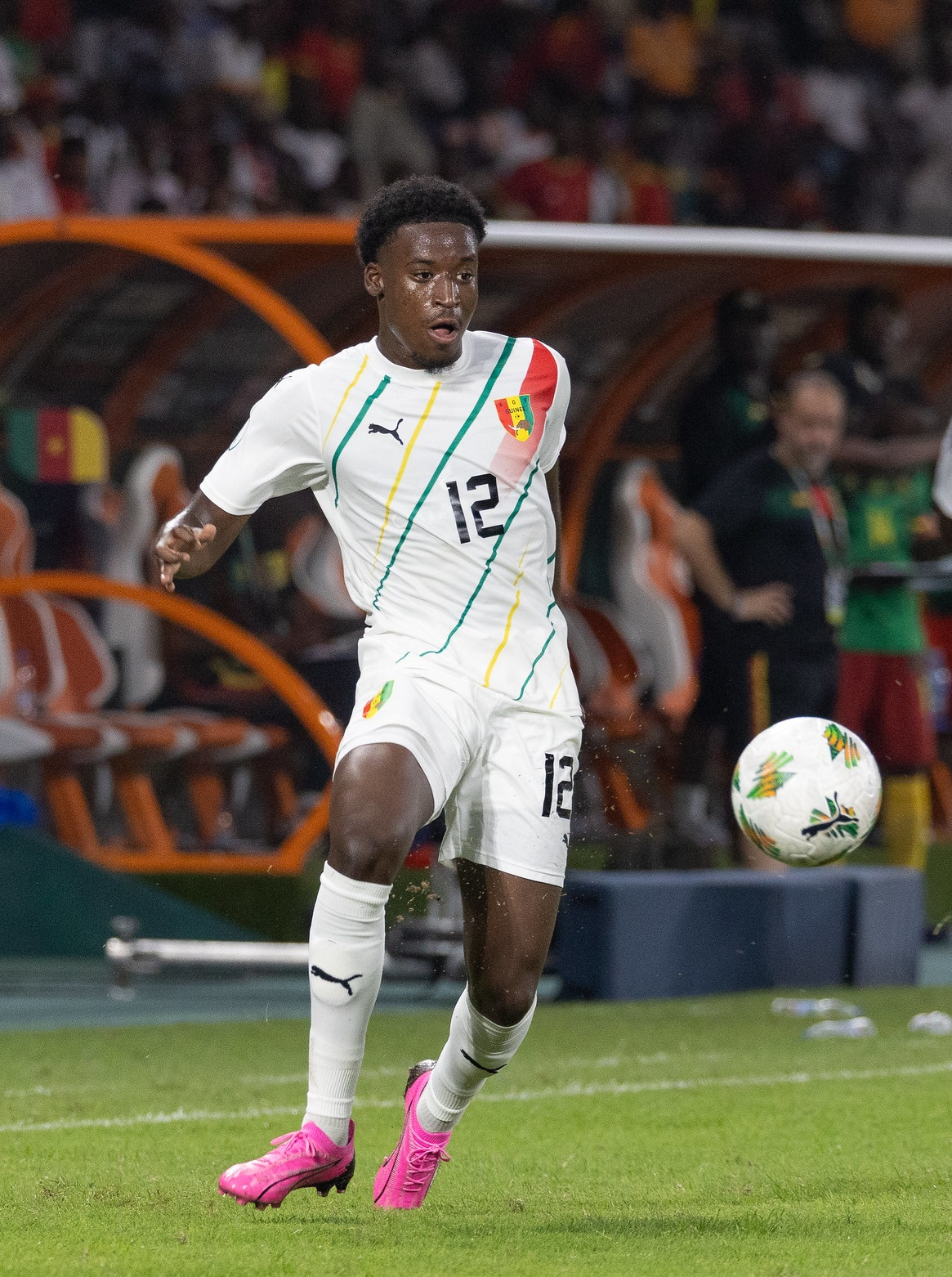
- Diakité in 2024

Personal information
- Date of birth: 31 October 2003 (age 23)
- Place of birth: Compiègne, France
- Height: 1.78 m (5 ft 10 in)
- Position: Defender

Team information
- Current team: Cercle Brugge
- Number: 2

Youth career
- Reims

Senior career*
| Years | Team | Apps | (Gls) |
| 2020–2024 | Reims II | 29 | (0) |
| 2021–2024 | Reims | 9 | (0) |
| 2023 | → Eupen (loan) | 10 | (0) |
| 2024 | → SLO (loan) | 10 | (1) |
| 2024– | Cercle Brugge | 47 | (3) |

International career
| 2024– | Guinea U23 | 1 | (0) |
| 2022– | Guinea | 7 | (0) |
- * Club domestic league appearances and goals as of 11 May 2026

Ibrahim Diakité (born 31 October 2003) is a professional footballer who plays as a defender for Belgian club Cercle Brugge. Born in France, he plays for the Guinea national team.

== Early life ==
Diakité was born in France to Guinean parents.

== Professional career ==
Diakité is a youth product of Reims, and debuted with their reserves in 2020. He was promoted to their senior team in 2021. He made his professional debut with Reims in a 1–1 Ligue 1 tie with Marseille on 22 December 2021.

On 13 January 2023, Diakité was loaned by Eupen in Belgium for the rest of the 2022–23 season.

On 15 February 2024, Diakité moved on loan to SLO in Switzerland.

On 3 July 2024, he joined Cercle Brugge on a four-season contract.

== International career ==
Born in France, Diakité is Guinean by descent. He was called up to the senior Guinea national team for a set of friendlies in September 2022. He made his debut with Guinea in a 3–1 friendly loss to Ivory Coast on 27 September 2022.

On 23 December 2023, he was selected from the list of 25 Guinean players selected by Kaba Diawara to compete in the 2023 Africa Cup of Nations.
