= Nathan Bitumazala =

French footballer (born 2002)

Personal information
- Full name: Nathan Julien Bitumazala
- Date of birth: 10 December 2002 (age 23)
- Place of birth: Fontainebleau, France
- Height: 1.78 m (5 ft 10 in)
- Position: Defensive midfielder

Team information
- Current team: Alemannia Aachen
- Number: 19

Youth career
- –2015: Savigny-le-Temple
- 2015–2021: Paris Saint-Germain

Senior career*
Years	Team	Apps	(Gls)
2021–2022	Paris Saint-Germain	1	(0)
2021–2022	Paris Saint-Germain B	9	(1)
2022–2026	Eupen	53	(2)
2026–	Alemannia Aachen	0	(0)
- * Club domestic league appearances and goals as of 20 April 2026

Nathan Julien Bitumazala (born 10 December 2002) is a French professional footballer who plays as a defensive midfielder for 3. Liga club Alemannia Aachen.

== Career ==
A former youth academy player of Savigny-le-Temple, Bitumazala joined the Paris Saint-Germain Academy in 2015. He signed his first professional contract on 3 September 2020, tying him to the club until June 2023. On 14 July 2021, he made his first appearance for the senior team in a 4–0 friendly win over Le Mans. His competitive debut came on 11 September 2021, as he came on as a substitute in a 4–0 Ligue 1 win over Clermont.

On 17 August 2022, Bitumazala joined Eupen on a four-year deal until June 2026.

== Personal life ==
Born in France, Bitumazala is of DR Congolese descent.

== Career statistics ==
As of 17 August 2022

Appearances and goals by club, season and competition
Club	Season	League			Cup		Continental		Other		Total	
Club	Season	Division	Apps	Goals	Apps	Goals	Apps	Goals	Apps	Goals	Apps	Goals
Paris Saint-Germain	2021–22	Ligue 1	1	0	0	0	0	0	0	0	1	0
Paris Saint-Germain B	2021–22	National 3	9	1	—		—		—		9	1
Eupen	2022–23	First Division A	0	0	0	0	—		0	0	0	0
Career total			10	1	0	0	0	0	0	0	10	1

== Honours ==
Paris Saint-Germain

- Ligue 1: 2021–22
