= Konan N'Dri =

Nigerien footballer (born 2000)

Personal information
- Full name: Konan Ignace Jocelyn N'Dri
- Date of birth: 27 August 2000 (age 26)
- Place of birth: Abidjan, Ivory Coast
- Height: 1.74 m (5 ft 9 in)
- Positions: Winger; forward

Team information
- Current team: Lecce
- Number: 11

Youth career
- ASPIRE Senegal

Senior career*
Years	Team	Apps	(Gls)
2019–2023	Eupen	109	(9)
2023–2025	OH Leuven	43	(3)
2025–	Lecce	45	(3)

International career^{‡}
2026–	Niger	3	(1)
- * Club domestic league appearances and goals as of 13:48, 18 October 2026 (UTC) ‡ National team caps and goals as of 20:05, 6 October 2026 (UTC)

Konan Ignace Jocelyn N'Dri (born 27 October 2000) is a professional footballer who plays as a winger or a forward for Serie A club Lecce. Born in the Ivory Coast, he plays for the Niger national team.

== Club career ==
On 31 January 2019, N'Dri signed a contract with the Belgian club Eupen with a term until 30 June 2019.

He made his Belgian First Division A debut for Eupen on 3 March 2019 in a game against Antwerp, as a 76th-minute substitute for Eric Ocansey. He scored his first goal in a 3–1 win over Beerschot V.A.

On 2 February 2025, N'Dri signed with Lecce in Italy.

== International career ==
Born in the Ivory Coast, N'Dri is of Nigerien descent and holds dual citizenship. He was called up to the Niger national team for a set of friendlies in June 2026.

=== International goals ===
As of match played 6 October 2026

Appearances and goals by national team and year
National team	Year	Apps	Goals
Niger	2026	3	1
Total		3	1

Scores and results list Niger's goal tally first, score column indicates score after each N'Dri goal.

List of international goals scored by Konan N'Dri
No.	Date	Venue	Opponent	Score	Result	Competition
1	6 October 2026	Hocine Aït Ahmed Stadium, Tizi Ouzou, Algeria	Algeria	1–0	1–2	Friendly
