= Boris Lambert =

Belgian footballer

Personal information
- Full name: Boris Luc Lambert
- Date of birth: 10 April 2000 (age 26)
- Place of birth: Han-sur-Lesse, Belgium
- Height: 1.87 m (6 ft 2 in)
- Position: Defender

Team information
- Current team: Kortrijk (on loan from Willem II)
- Number: 35

Youth career
- 2011–2015: Standard Liège
- 2015–2016: Virton
- 2016–2019: Eupen

Senior career*
Years	Team	Apps	(Gls)
2018–2024	Eupen	85	(6)
2024–	Willem II	26	(2)
2025–	→ Kortrijk (loan)	30	(4)
- * Club domestic league appearances and goals as of 19 April 2026

Boris Luc Lambert (born 10 April 2000) is a Belgian footballer who plays for Challenger Pro League club Kortrijk on loan from the Dutch club Willem II as a centre-back and defensive midfielder.

== Club career ==
Lambert was first featured in Eupen's senior squad in 2018, but did not make any appearances between 2018 and 2021. Lambert made his Belgian First Division A debut for Eupen on 25 July 2021 in a game against Club Brugge. He scored his first goal against Sint-Truiden on 14 August 2021.

On 29 August 2024, Lambert signed a four-year contract with Willem II in the Netherlands.

On 30 June 2025, Lambert returned to Belgium and joined Kortrijk on loan with an option to buy.

== Career statistics ==
As of match played 19 February 2022

Appearances and goals by club, season and competition
Club	Season	League			National Cup		Europe		Other		Total	
Club	Season	Division	Apps	Goals	Apps	Goals	Apps	Goals	Apps	Goals	Apps	Goals
Eupen	2021–22	First Division A	23	1	4	0	—		—		27	1
Career total			2	0	1	0			0	0	27	1
