= Gary Magnée =

Belgian footballer (born 1999)

Personal information
- Full name: Gary Jean Paul Fernard Magnée
- Date of birth: 12 October 1999 (age 27)
- Place of birth: Soumagne, Belgium
- Height: 1.73 m (5 ft 8 in)
- Position: Right-back

Team information
- Current team: Cercle Brugge
- Number: 15

Youth career
- 2009–2011: Anderlecht
- 2011–2015: Genk
- 2015–2016: Club Brugge
- 2016–2018: Genk
- 2018–2019: Eupen

Senior career*
Years	Team	Apps	(Gls)
2019–2024	Eupen	79	(7)
2024–	Cercle Brugge	65	(4)
- * Club domestic league appearances and goals as of 11 May 2026

Gary Jean Paul Fernand Magnée (born 12 October 1999) is a Belgian professional footballer who plays as a right-back for Cercle Brugge.

== Career ==
Magnée played in the youth academies of Anderlecht, Genk and Club Brugge, before joining Eupen in 2018.

Magnée signed his first professional contract with Eupen on 13 June 2019. He then made his official debut for Eupen in the Belgian Cup on 25 September 2019, in the match against Cappellen where he played 120 minutes, including extra-time. Eupen eventually qualified for the next round by winning on a penalty-shootout.

Magnée made his league debut with Eupen in a 3–0 Belgian First Division A loss to Club Brugge on 26 December 2020. On 10 February 2021, Magnée scored his first professional goal, when manager Beñat San José had him in the starting lineup for the cup match against Olympic Charleroi. Eupen managed to win the match 5–1 and thus qualify for the quarter-finals, with a goal as well as 3 assists, Magnée played a large part in this.

On 17 August 2024, Magnée signed a four-season contract with Cercle Brugge.
