= Rune Paeshuyse =

Belgian footballer

Personal information
- Date of birth: 22 March 2002 (age 24)
- Place of birth: Edegem, Belgium
- Height: 1.87 m (6 ft 2 in)
- Position: Centre-back

Team information
- Current team: Eupen
- Number: 28

Youth career
- Turnhout
- 2012–2021: Mechelen

Senior career*
Years	Team	Apps	(Gls)
2021–2022	Mechelen	1	(0)
2022–	Eupen	117	(5)

International career^{‡}
2020	Belgium U19	1	(0)
- * Club domestic league appearances and goals as of 20 April 2026 ‡ National team caps and goals as of 11 February 2023

Rune Paeshuyse (born 22 March 2002) is a Belgian professional footballer who plays as a centre-back for the Challenger Pro League club Eupen.

== Club career ==
Paeshuyse is a youth product of Turnhout and Mechelen, having played with the club for 10 years. He signed his first professional contract with the club on 23 January 2020 until 2022. He made his senior and professional debut with Mechelen as a late substitute in a 3–2 Belgian Pro League loss to Charleroi on 14 May 2022. On 24 May 2022, he moved to Eupen on a free transfer signing a 3-year contract.

== International career ==
Paeshuyse is a youth international for Belgium, having played for the Belgium U19s in 2020.
