= Jérôme Déom =

Belgian footballer (born 1999)

Personal information
- Date of birth: 19 April 1999 (age 27)
- Place of birth: Libramont-Chevigny, Belgium
- Height: 1.75 m (5 ft 9 in)
- Position: Central midfielder

Team information
- Current team: Roda JC Kerkrade
- Number: 24

Youth career
- RES Orgeotoise
- 2008–2016: Standard Liège

Senior career*
Years	Team	Apps	(Gls)
2016–2019	Standard Liège	10	(0)
2018–2019	→ MVV (loan)	31	(3)
2019–2021	MVV	61	(3)
2021–2025	Eupen	96	(4)
2025–	Roda JC Kerkrade	15	(0)

International career^{‡}
2014	Belgium U15	1	(0)
2014–2015	Belgium U16	10	(0)
2015–2016	Belgium U17	5	(0)
2017	Belgium U18	2	(0)
2017–2018	Belgium U19	5	(0)
- * Club domestic league appearances and goals as of 25 April 2026 ‡ National team caps and goals as of 24 November 2020

Jérôme Déom (born 19 April 1999) is a Belgian professional footballer who plays as a midfielder for Dutch Eerste Divisie club Roda JC Kerkrade.

== Club career ==
Déom is a youth exponent from Standard Liège. On 7 May 2016, he made his Belgian Pro League debut against Waasland-Beveren.

On 13 July 2021, he signed a three-year contract with Eupen.

On 30 October 2025, Déom returned to the Netherlands and signed a two-season contract with Roda JC Kerkrade.
