= Yentl Van Genechten =

Belgian footballer

Personal information
- Date of birth: 18 August 2000 (age 26)
- Place of birth: Heist-op-den-Berg, Belgium
- Height: 1.91 m (6 ft 3 in)
- Position: Right-back

Team information
- Current team: Eupen
- Number: 2

Youth career
- Heist
- 2010–2013: Westerlo
- 2013–2015: Mechelen
- 2015–2018: Westerlo

Senior career*
Years	Team	Apps	(Gls)
2018–2020	Westerlo	7	(2)
2019–2020	→ Thes Sport (loan)	16	(0)
2020–2021	Lierse Kempenzonen	25	(1)
2021–2022	Genk	0	(0)
2022–	Eupen	116	(11)
- * Club domestic league appearances and goals as of 20 April 2026

Yentl Van Genechten (born 18 August 2000) is a Belgian professional footballer who plays as a right-back for Challenger Pro League club Eupen.

== Club career ==
Van Genechten is a youth product of Heist, Mechelen, and Westerlo. He signed his first professional contract with Westerlo on 13 March 2018. He had a season-long loan with Thes Sport in the 2019–20 season. He then transferred to Lierse Kempenzonen on 17 April 2020. The following season he joined the Genk U21s on 10 July 2021. On 28 June 2022, he transferred to the Belgian Pro League club Eupen until 2025.
