= Abdul Manaf Nurudeen =

Ghanaian footballer (born 1999)

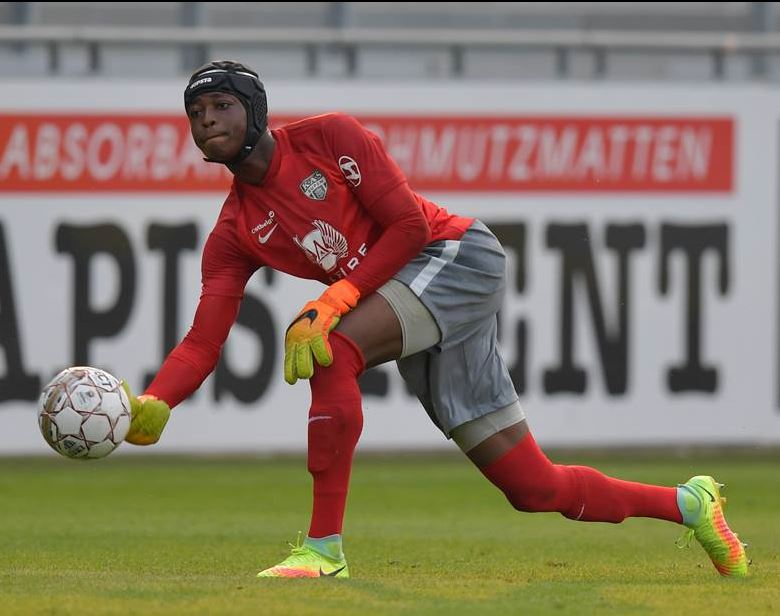

Personal information
- Full name: Abdul Manaf Nurudeen
- Date of birth: 8 February 1999 (age 27)
- Place of birth: Accra, Ghana
- Height: 1.90 m (6 ft 3 in)
- Position: Goalkeeper

Youth career
- –2017: Aspire Academy

Senior career*
Years	Team	Apps	(Gls)
2017–2026	Eupen	39	(0)

International career^{‡}
2019	Ghana U20	3	(0)
2022–	Ghana	6	(0)
- * Club domestic league appearances and goals as of 20 April 2026 ‡ National team caps and goals as of 18 November 2024

Abdul Manaf Nurudeen (born 8 February 1999) is a Ghanaian professional footballer who plays as a goalkeeper for the Ghana national team.

== Club career ==
As a youth player, Manaf Nurudeen joined the Senegalese Aspire Academy.

In 2017, he signed for Eupen in Belgium. On 7 November 2020, he debuted for Eupen during a 1–1 draw with Waasland-Beveren.

Manaf Nurudeen wears a goalkeeper helmet.

== International career ==
Manaf Nurudeen represented Ghana at the 2019 Africa U-20 Cup of Nations.

He was first called up to the Ghana national team in September 2021 for the World Cup qualifiers against Ethiopia and South Africa, and remained on the bench in these games.

Nurudeen was part of the Ghanaian team in the 2021 Africa Cup of Nations that was eliminated at the group stage of the competition. He debuted with Ghana in a 3–0 friendly loss to Algeria on 5 January 2022.

== Career statistics ==
=== Club ===
As of 7 April 2024

Appearances and goals by club, season and competition
Club	Season	League			Cup		Other		Total	
Club	Season	Division	Apps	Goals	Apps	Goals	Apps	Goals	Apps	Goals
Eupen	2020–21	Belgian First Division A	1	0	0	0	—		1	0
Eupen	2021–22	Belgian First Division A	20	0	4	0	—		24	0
Eupen	2022–23	Belgian Pro League	4	0	1	0	—		5	0
Eupen	2023–24	Belgian Pro League	2	0	0	0	1	0	3	0
Career total			27	0	5	0	1	0	33	0

=== International ===
Appearances and goals by national team and year
National team	Year	Apps	Goals
Ghana	2022	2	0
Ghana	2023	2	0
Ghana	2024	2	0
Total		6	0
