= Kehrwegstadion =

Football stadium

Stadion am Kehrweg
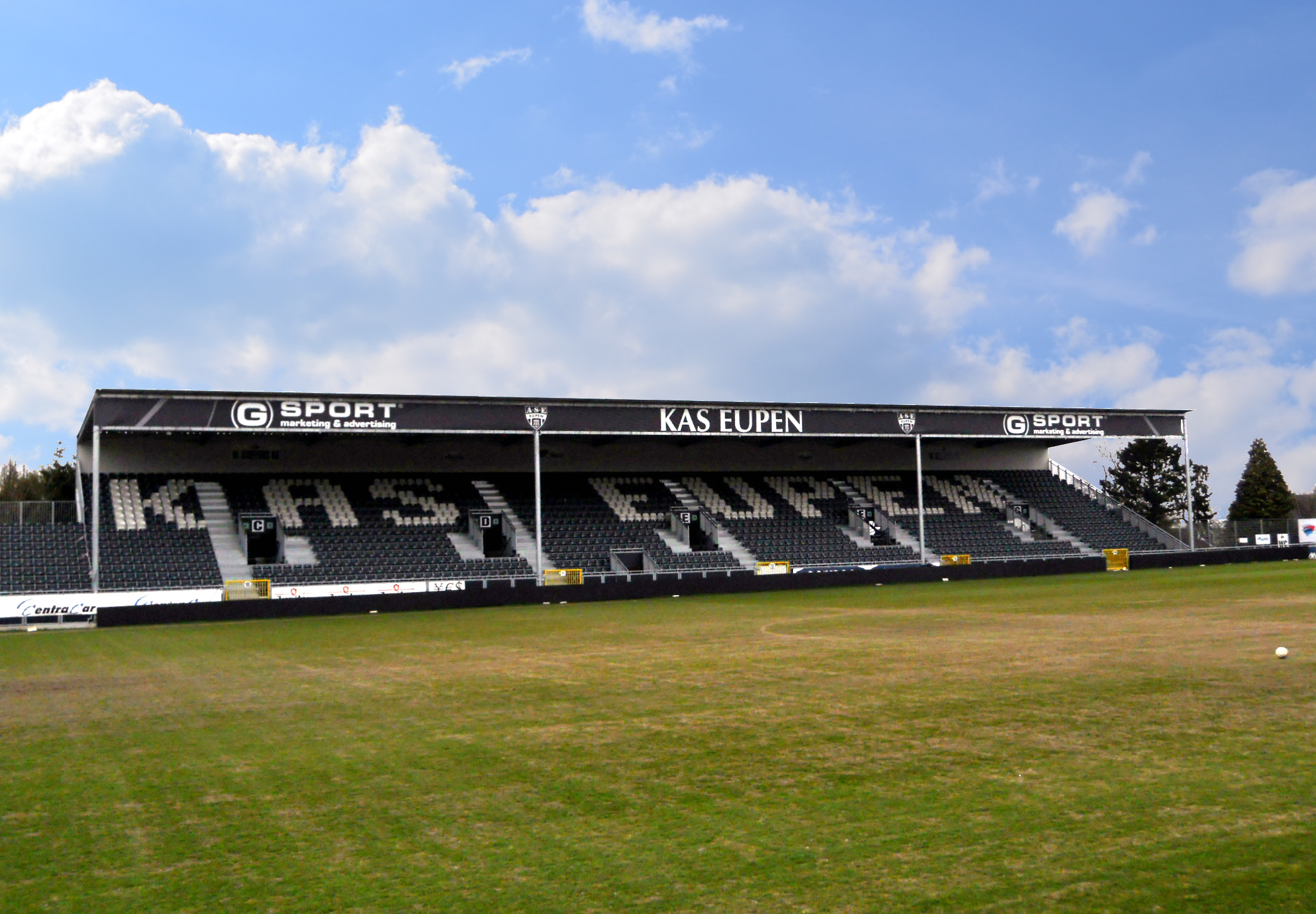
- Interactive map of Stadion am Kehrweg
- Location: Eupen, Belgium
- Coordinates: 50°37′35″N 6°2′45″E
- Capacity: 8,363

Construction
- Opened: 1947

Tenant
- K.A.S. Eupen

The Kehrwegstadion is a multi-purpose stadium in Eupen, Belgium. It is mainly used for football matches and hosts the home matches of K.A.S. Eupen of the Belgian First Division. The stadium has a capacity of 8,363 of which 5,603 are seats and 2,760 are standing places. The stadium was a venue of the 2007 European Under-17 Football Championship.
