= Amadou Keita =

Guinean footballer

Personal information
- Full name: Amadou Keita
- Date of birth: 28 October 2001 (age 25)
- Place of birth: Conakry, Guinea
- Height: 1.70 m (5 ft 7 in)
- Position: Midfielder

Team information
- Current team: Eupen
- Number: 18

Youth career
- 2005–2017: JS Grivegnée
- 2017–2018: RFC Liège
- 2018–2022: Eupen

Senior career*
Years	Team	Apps	(Gls)
2022–	Eupen	76	(1)
- * Club domestic league appearances and goals as of 20 April 2026

Amadou Keita (born 28 October 2001) is a Guinean professional footballer who plays as a midfielder for the Belgian Challenger Pro League club Eupen.

== Club career ==
Keita is a youth product of the Belgian clubs JS Grivegnée, RFC Liège and Eupen. On 31 July 2019, he signed his first professional contract with Eupen until 2022. He made his senior debut with Eupen in a 2–0 Belgian First Division A loss to Club Brugge on 16 January 2022. On 27 June 2022, he extended his contract until 2023. On 18 July 2023, he again extended his contract until 2025.

== International career ==
In November 2023, Keita was called up to the Guinea national team for a set of 2026 FIFA World Cup qualification matches.
