= KAS Eupen =

Belgian professional football club

Eupen
- Full name: Königliche Allgemeine Sportvereinigung Eupen
- Nickname: Pandas
- Founded: 9 July 1945; 81 years ago
- Ground: Kehrwegstadion
- Capacity: 8,363
- Owner: Qatar Sports Investments
- President: Mishal bin Khalifa bin Nasser Al-Thani
- Manager: Felice Mazzù
- League: Challenger Pro League
- 2025–26: Challenger Pro League, 7th of 17
- Website: as-eupen.be
Home colours	Away colours	Third colours

KAS Eupen (short for Königliche Allgemeine Sportvereinigung Eupen, English: Royal General Sports Association Eupen, simply referred to as Eupen) is a Belgian professional association football club located in Eupen, Province of Liège, which currently plays in the Challenger Pro League, the second tier of Belgian football. The club was formed on 9 July 1945 through the merger of two older Eupen clubs, Jugend Eupen and FC Eupen 1920.

The club has been playing at the Kehrwegstadion in Eupen since its inaugural season. Eupen is the first Belgian club based in the German-speaking Community of Belgium to have played in the Belgian top division.

== History ==
=== Foundation and early years ===
KAS Eupen were formed on 9 July 1945 from the merger of Jugend Eupen and FC Eupen 1920, and played its first official match on 21 July during a festive tournament during a national holiday.

A few weeks later, the club would begin on its inaugural season in the Liège Provincial Division II. While the first stand was built in 1947 and lighting was installed the following year, and the infrastructure thus improved, the club could not avoid relegation to the Regional Division II. Under the leadership of player-coach Roger Burgers, Eupen won the first title in its history, which was then repeated the following year, enabling the club to reach national divisions for the first time in 1951.

The club's stint in the national division was short-lived at first, but the club secured another promotion at the end of the 1955–56 season. The team was then led by Albert Bertrand. After a further descent two years later, the club returned with promotion before the 1961–62 season to stabilise in the higher divisions until 1969.

Having arrived at the club in 1966, Hubert Van Dormael took the team to a second-place finish in the 1967–68 season before taking a historic first promotion to the Belgian Third Division the following season, ahead of LC Bastogne and Herve FC in the standings. The club then decided to construct a new stand the following year. In the process, Van Dormael led the team to the Third Division title, which meant its first promotion to the Belgian Second Division. The title-winning team featured some of the most iconic players of the club's history, including Werner Pirard and Karl Franssen, the emblematic captain Günter Brüll, as well as goalkeeper Elmar Keutgen, future mayor of the City of Eupen and member of the Parliament of the German-speaking Community.

=== The Golden Five ===
Prior to their first season in the second tier of Belgian football, Eupen and their manager Paul Brossel were ambitious in the off-season: although considered one of the three best goalkeepers in the Bundesliga by the German sports press along with Sepp Maier and Manfred Manglitz, Gerhard Prokop signed from Alemannia Aachen before the 1970–71 season. Eupen lost their first home match against FC Malinois but won the next against Jean Nicolay's Daring Club Bruxelles, earning their first win in the second tier.

After surviving their first season in the second tier, the club recorded another big signing during the off-season as Philippe Garot arrived at the Kehrweg. A few weeks later, a second German player, Helmut Graf, signed from Bonner SC. Eupen survived in the second division once again, finishing in tenth place in the 1971–72 season. At the end of the season and after six years at the club, Hubert Van Dormael was replaced by Gerhard Prokop, who took over the reins as player-coach. But, lacking the funds, the club was forced to part with some key players at the end of the season, including Philippe Garot.

Paul Brossel once again chose to recruit players in Germany in the off-season, with Rot-Weiß Oberhausen top goalscorer Ulrich Kallius arriving in Eupen at the start of the 1972–73 season. Kallius would go down in club history as one of their best strikers, (Note: Statement by Ralph Lentz, president of the ASBL "AS Eupen", during his speech during the official ceremony of the 70th anniversary of the club, on 13 December 2015.) scoring 16 goals in 25 games that season. Despite this, Eupen had an average season, finishing only in thirteenth place.

Still in the throes of their financial woes, the club was once again forced to sell some of their best elements. Kallius and Graf joined Olympique Charleroi. To compensate for these departures, Paul Brossel managed to sign another German striker: using the money received for the sale of Kallius, he signed Rainer Gebauer, a striker from 1. FC Köln. The 1973–74 season also marked the return of Hubert Van Dormael, as coach, with Prokop regaining his status as a player. This proved a positive change, as the team occupied the top of the league standings in the fall. Slightly running out of steam, Eupen remained on course for promotion before the last matchday of the season against Lokeren. While Eupen were up 0–1 fifteen minutes before full-time, Lokeren scored on a penalty kick to equalise, before scoring a second goal at the very end of the match. This meant that Lokeren went past Eupen in the standings, and meant that they missed out on direct promotion. The Pandas then turned to the play-offs for a chance to win a historic promotion, but morale was gone and the team recorded six defeats in as many games.

To the sporting disappointment were added new financial problems which forced the club to once again sell its best players: Gebauer left for Charleroi, Taeter signed with Winterslag and Prokop with Aachen. The club, however, continued developing its infrastructure, creating its first board of directors and installing new lighting at the home ground. The team would struggle performance-wise the next few seasons, and suffered relegation to the Third Division at the end of the 1974–75 season.

=== Ups and downs ===
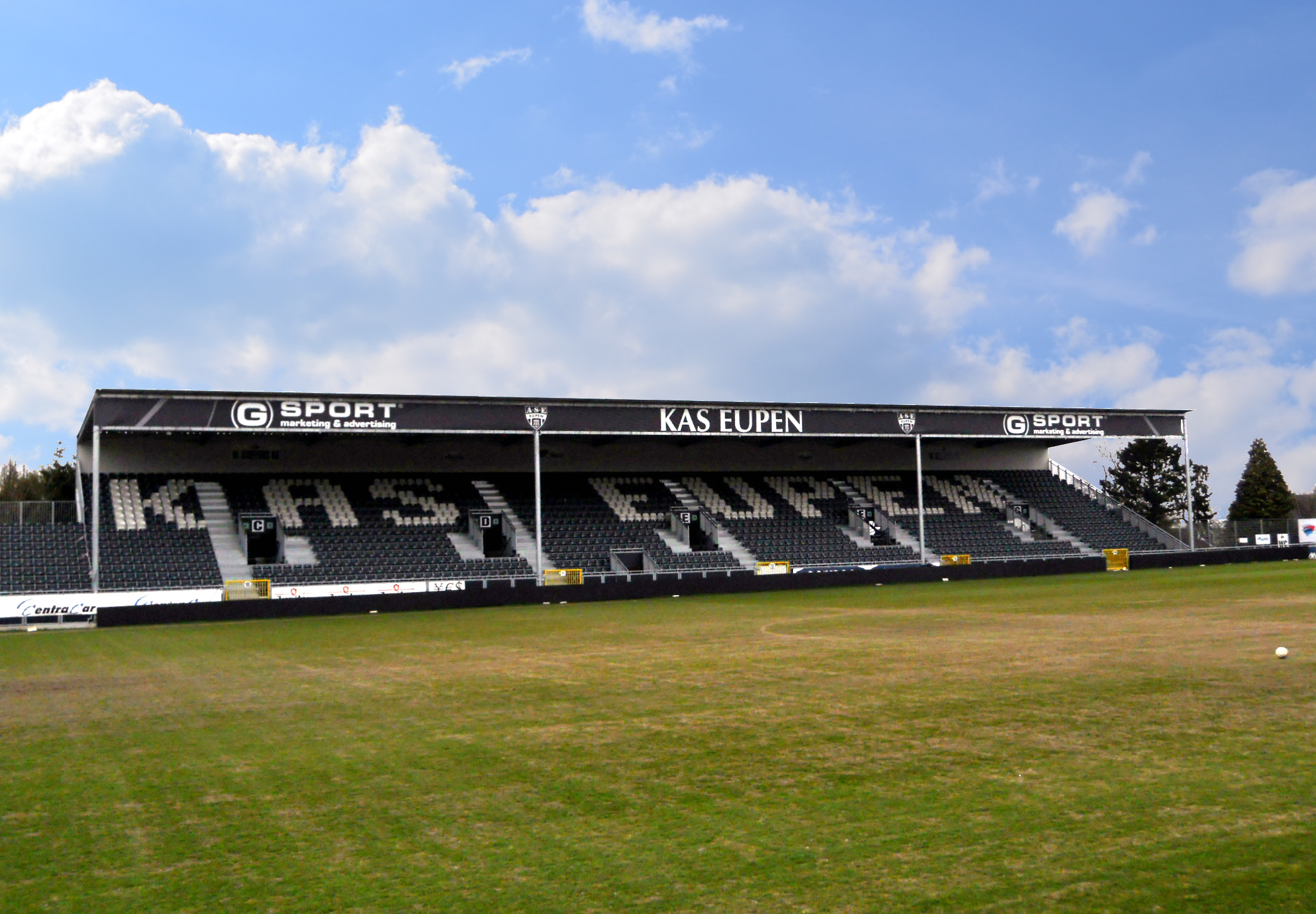
Stand at the Kehrwegstadion, home ground of Eupen

With René Irgel as new manager, Eupen won the title the following season, allowing them to return to the second division. This was, however, short-lived and the club relegated the following year.

After several seasons in the third tier, the club won promotion again at the end of the 1980–81 season. During this period, three major changes took place at the club: the club chose to focus its sports policy on training, the City of Eupen bought the club's facilities for a period of 30 years in May 1979, and the club changed its name to become the Allgemeine Sportvereinigung Eupen.

With mainly young players, Claude Siemianow won the club another title in 1984 on the final day of the season, beating Spouwen 5–1, while their main rivals for the championship, Alken, were beaten 2–0 by Mol. This title allowed Eupen to return to the third division. Top goalscorer in the league for the second consecutive year, Pierrot Thissen played an important part in this success.

The club remained in the third division until the end of the 1987–88 season. For a few seasons, Eupen played in the Belgian Fourth Division. It even took the providential return of club legend, Hubert Van Dormael, to save the club from relegation in the spring of 1989. From 1992, performances improved. In 1995, under the leadership of Tony Fagot, Eupen finished second in the league and once again reached the third division, this time through promotion play-offs. Among the key players of this period are local goalkeeper, Frank Neumann and Frank Mockel.

Behind the scenes, too, the club was recovering. In 1993, an agreement was struck between the club and the city for the construction of a brand new all-seater stand, including among others a cafeteria and a business section. On 26 March 1993, the old terracing stand was demolished. On 2 January 1994, the new structure was inaugurated during a friendly match between two renowned neighbouring clubs: Standard Liège and 1. FC Köln.

Back in the third division, the club celebrated its fiftieth anniversary on this occasion, obtaining the "Royal" prefix on 28 September 1995. On the pitch, the club returned to the top of the division under head coach Claudy Chauveheid, who arrived in 1996. During this period, primarily young players from the region represent the first team, including Marc Chauveheid, son of the coach and scorer of 90 goals during his career at Eupen. Thanks in particular to this father-son connection, the club won another title and returned to the second division for the first time since 1977. Surprisingly, the club pushed on for promotion to the First Division, which they were close to reaching in the 2002–03 season, before eventually losing in the play-offs.

After this run, Eupen's results worsened, and after the departure of Claudy Chauveheid, the club fell to the bottom of the second division in the winter of 2008. At that point, Italian investors, represented by Antonino Imborgia, took over at the Kehrweg. Many players from Italy and Switzerland, in particular, were signed to the club. The club started the spring season with Danny Ost as manager and managed to avoid relegation to the third tier. In the wake of this, the club started the 2009–10 season with increased ambitions and found themselves at the top of the second division a few rounds in. Eupen eventually qualified for the third time in its history to the play-offs for promotion to the Belgian Pro League (after 1974 and 2003). Although not deemed favourites before the play-offs, Eupen managed a historic promotion after a 2–1 victory over Mons to win in the final round. The promotion marked the first time, that a club from the German-speaking Community of Belgium reached the top tier.

=== First season in first division ===
Fully professionalised, requirement set by the Belgian First Division as part of the granting of the licence necessary to be able to play in the top division, notably involved the modernisation and expansion of the Kehrwegstadion. During construction, Eupen played their first home matches at Stayen in Sint-Truiden. Their start to life in the top tier was difficult, and the team suffered five defeats in five matches. Danny Ost was dismissed and replaced by Ezio Capuano. He only stayed in charge of the team for 19 days before resigning and being replaced by Albert Cartier. Under the French manager the team gradually improved. For their first home match at the rebuilt stadium, Eupen won their first match at top level in a 6–0 blowout over Sint-Truiden. The club quickly recorded other positive results, but would struggle against relegation for large parts of the 2010–11 season.

In the final matchday of the regular season, Eupen played away against another relegation candidate, Mechelen, while Lierse, themselves also fighting relegation, played away at Club Brugge. While Eupen lost their match 2–0, Lierse managed a 0–0 draw to heed themselves from relegation. Eupen then had to go through relegation play-offs where they managed to qualify for the final rounds, while direct competitor Charleroi were relegated. Eupen would, however struggle in the final round against teams from the second division, where Eupen finished dead last which meant relegation and a return to the second division.

=== Qatari ownership ===
In June 2012, the club was purchased by the government of Qatar and its Aspire Zone Foundation, who also own Paris Saint-Germain. Aspire Academy announced their intent to use the club as a launching pad into European football for its academy graduates from Africa, South America and Asia.

Eupen finished second in the 2015–16 Second Division, gaining promotion to the top flight of Belgian football for the second time in their history, staying up at the end of the season for the first time.

The 2017–18 season began with a major upheaval in the squad; the best scorers of the last season, Onyekuru and Sylla, were given up. Until the winter break, AS Eupen never got past third from last place and were bottom of the table from matchday 14 to 23 before they defeated the runners-up, Charleroi, 1–0 at home. In the meantime, head coach Jordi Condom was dismissed on 7 November 2017, and replaced by the former French international Claude Makélélé. KV Mechelen became their main relegation competitor. Before the last game day, both teams were tied in points. Eupen had a goal difference that was one goal worse, but scored more goals, so if both teams won or lost at the same time, they had to change goal difference in order to stay up.

On the last day of the regular competition Eupen played against Royal Excel Mouscron, whilst Mechelen played against Waasland-Beveren. At halftime, it was still 0–0 in both places. In the 51st minute, the hosts took a 1–0 lead in Mechelen and increased to 2–0 in the 59th minute. Now Eupen had to score three goals to stay in the league. Winter newcomer Yuta Toyokawa scored the first goal in the 73rd minute after a free-kick from captain Luis García, with another goal three minutes later by García 2–0. In the 79th minute, Toyokawa with his second goal increased the result to 3–0, which meant Eupen was "saved" at this point. Since nothing changed in the score in Mechelen, and Toyokawa even scored again 4–0 in the 89th minute, the "miracle of the Kehrweg" was perfect and Eupen stayed in the first division.

In the 2018–19 season, the club reached 12th place in the table. For the first time, Eupen was not involved in the relegation battle. Nevertheless, on 14 June 2019, the dismissal of Claude Makélélé was announced. Despite his statement that he will be available to the club as an ambassador for various projects, he resigned after a month and moved to Chelsea as a mentor for youth players.

On 24 June 2019, Beñat San José was announced as the new head coach with a contract term of two years. Stefan Krämer took over the managerial role in July 2021, but was dismissed in February 2022 following a streak of poor results.

On 9th December 2025, Qatar Sports Investments announced their intention to buy the club from Aspire.

== Honours ==
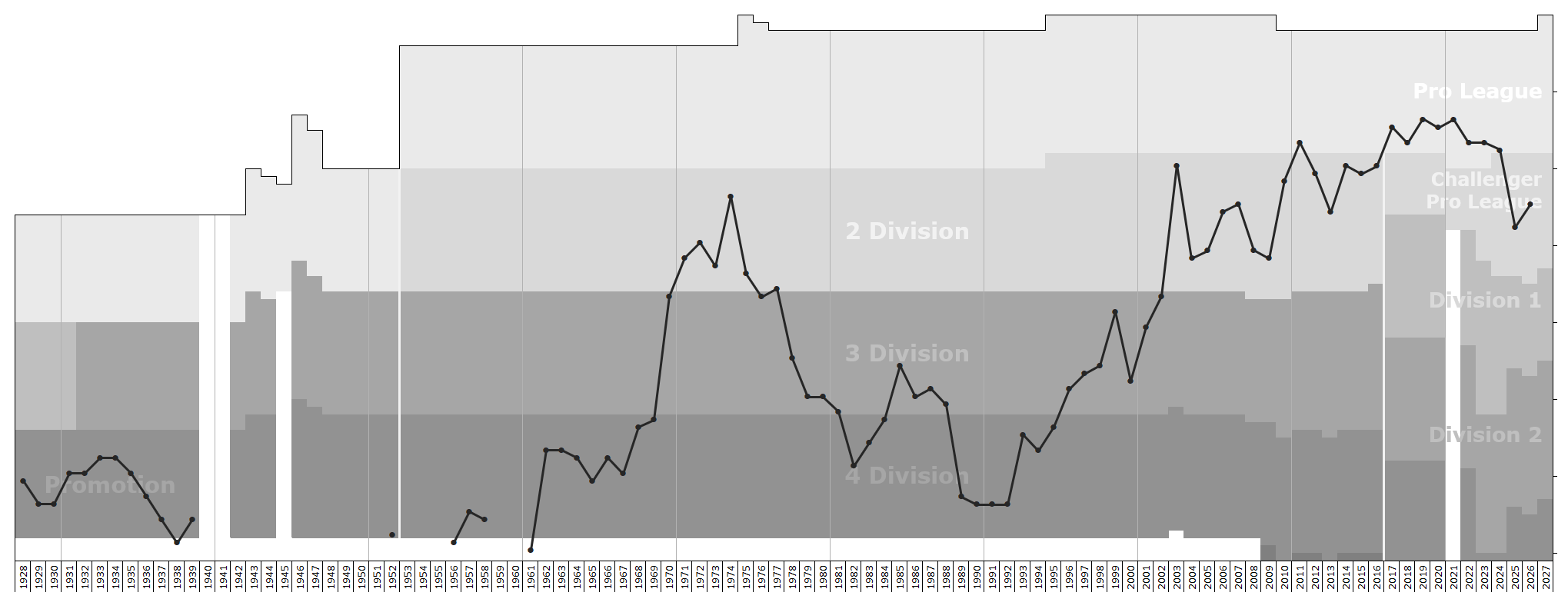
Historical chart of KAS Eupen league performance

=== National ===
- Belgian Second Division
  - Runners-up (3): 2002–03, 2013–14, 2015–16
- Belgian Third Division
  - Winners (3): 1969–70, 1975–76, 2001–02
- Belgian Fourth Division
  - Winners (2): 1968–69, 1983–84
  - Runners-up (2): 1967–68, 1994–95

=== Regional ===
- Liège First Provincial
  - Winners (1): 1955–56

== Players ==
As of 7 September 2026

Note: Flags indicate national team as defined under FIFA eligibility rules; some limited exceptions apply. Players may hold more than one non-FIFA nationality.

No.	Pos.	Nation	Player
1	GK	GER	Marco Hiller
2	DF	BEL	Yentl Van Genechten
3	DF	BEL	Michael Precious
5	DF	FRA	Nicolas Gavory
6	MF	BEL	Gaëtan Hendrickx
7	FW	GHA	Isaac Nuhu
9	FW	BEL	Aron Sulejmani
10	MF	CIV	Chris-Kévin Nadje
11	FW	GER	Ba-Muaka Simakala
13	DF	BEL	Lorenzo Youndje
14	MF	BEL	Raphael Di Matteo
17	FW	GBS	Sandro Vidigal (on loan from Braga)
18	MF	GUI	Amadou Keita
19	MF	BEL	Bertan Caliskan
21	DF	GBS	Malam Malu

No.	Pos.	Nation	Player
22	FW	FRA	Logan Delaurier-Chaubet
24	GK	BEL	Antoine Lejoly
25	FW	BEL	Jaden Malhage
27	MF	GER	Mark Müller
28	DF	BEL	Rune Paeshuyse
32	DF	UKR	Ihor Plastun
44	GK	GER	Julian Renner
47	DF	BEL	Theo Marechal
56	FW	BEL	Matteo Filorizzo
57	MF	BEL	Victor Tihon
66	MF	ESP	Oriol Busquets
70	MF	BEL	Mathias Fixelles
77	GK	BEL	Gaël Criminisi
98	FW	POR	Kikas

== Staff and management ==
As of 17 July 2025

=== Organizational chart ===
Position	Name
President	(Qatar) Mishal bin Khalifa bin Nasser Al-Thani
Majority shareholder	(Qatar) Aspire Zone Foundation
Board member	(Qatar) Mumtaz bin Humaid bin Abdul Aziz Al-Thani
Board member	(Qatar) Saqr bin Abdullah bin Khalifa Al-Thani
Board member	(Qatar) Mohamed bin Thamer bin Ahmed Al-Thani
General Director	(Qatar) Abdul Aziz bin Nasser bin Rashid Al-Thani
Director of Finance	(Qatar) Sultan bin Tariq bin Khalid Al-Thani
Sporting Director	(Qatar) Razzaq bin Abdulrahman bin Khalifa Al-Thani

=== Technical staff ===
Position	Name
Manager	(Portugal) Bruno Pinheiro
Assistant manager	(Portugal) João Coimbra (Portugal) Jorge Almeida
Goalkeeping coach	(Portugal) Stefan Olímpio
Physical coach	(Portugal) João Coimbra
