= 2024–25 Cercle Brugge KSV season =

Cercle Brugge K.S.V.
2024–25 season
- Manager: Miron Muslić (until 2 December); Ferdinand Feldhofer (from 10 December)
- Stadium: Jan Breydel Stadium
- Belgian Pro League: 15th
- Belgian Cup: Eighth round
- UEFA Europa League: Third qualifying round
- UEFA Conference League: League phase
- Top goalscorer: League: Kévin Denkey (10); All: Kévin Denkey (15)
Home colours	Away colours
- All statistics correct as of 15 December 2024.

The 2024–25 season is the 126th season in the history of Cercle Brugge K.S.V., and the club's 36th consecutive season in Belgian Pro League. In addition to the domestic league, the team is participating in the Belgian Cup, the UEFA Europa League, and the UEFA Conference League.

== Season events ==
On 21 November 2024, Major League Soccer club FC Cincinnati announced they had signed Kévin Denkey for an MLS record transfer fee of $16.2 million, with the player officially joining the club in January 2025. It was also a club record fee received by Cercle Brugge.

Following a 2–3 defeat to Beerschot on 1 December, Miron Muslic was sacked as the club's manager. He was replaced on 10 December by Austrian coach Ferdinand Feldhofer, who had been in the same role at Dinamo Tbilisi.

== Transfers ==
=== In ===
Pos.	Player	Transferred from	Fee	Date	Source
MF	(France) Malamine Efekele	AS Monaco	Loan	3 July 2024	
DF	(Guinea) Ibrahim Diakité	(France) Stade de Reims	Undisclosed	3 July 2024	
MF	(Ghana) Lawrence Agyekum	(Austria) Red Bull Salzburg	Loan	4 July 2024	
FW	(Brazil) Bruninho	(Brazil) Red Bull Bragantino	Loan	10 July 2024	

=== Out ===
Pos.	Player	Transferred to	Fee	Date	Source
FW	(Germany) Emilio Kehrer	(Netherlands) Willem II	Undisclosed	5 July 2024	
FW	(Togo) Kévin Denkey	(United States) FC Cincinnati	$16.2 million	1 January 2025	

== Friendlies ==
=== Pre-season ===
6 July 2024 Friendly	Cercle Brugge (Belgium)	3–2	(Cyprus) AEK Larnaca	Venray, Netherlands
14:00	Olaigbe 19'; Somers 41', 51'	Report	Diemers 45'; Santos 53'	Stadium: Sportpark De Wieën

13 July 2024 Friendly	Monaco	1–1	(Belgium) Cercle Brugge
10:30	Kehrer 12'		Denkey 10' (pen.)

20 July 2024 Friendly	Feyenoord (Netherlands)	1–0	(Belgium) Cercle Brugge	Rotterdam, Netherlands
13:00	Milambo 3'			Stadium: Varkenoord
Note: Two periods of 45 minutes and one period of 30 minutes

== Competitions ==
=== Overall record ===
Competition	First match	Last match	Starting round	Final position	Record							
Competition	First match	Last match	Starting round	Final position	Pld	W	D	L	GF	GA	GD	Win %
Belgian Pro League	28 July 2024		Matchday 1		18	4	5	9	19	31	−12	22.22
Belgian Cup	31 October 2024	4 December 2024	Seventh round	Eighth round	2	1	0	1	3	1	+2	50.00
UEFA Europa League	25 July 2024	15 August 2024	Second qualifying round	Third qualifying round	4	2	1	1	3	4	−1	50.00
UEFA Conference League	22 August 2024		Play-off round		7	4	1	2	20	11	+9	57.14
Total					31	11	7	13	45	47	−2	35.48

Last updated: 15 December 2024
Source: Soccerway

=== Belgian Pro League ===
==== Regular season ====
Pos	Team	Pld	W	D	L	GF	GA	GD	Pts	Qualification or relegation
11	OH Leuven	30	8	13	9	28	33	−5	37	Qualification for the Europe play-offs
12	Dender EH	30	8	8	14	33	51	−18	32	Qualification for the Europe play-offs
13	Cercle Brugge	30	7	11	12	29	44	−15	32	Qualification for the Relegation play-offs
14	Sint-Truiden	30	7	10	13	41	56	−15	31	Qualification for the Relegation play-offs
15	Kortrijk	30	7	5	18	28	55	−27	26	Qualification for the Relegation play-offs

Source: Jupiler Pro League (in Dutch), Soccerway
Rules for classification: 1) Points; 2) Matches won; 3) Goal difference; 4) Goals scored; 5) Away matches won; 6) Away goal difference; 7) Away goals scored; 8) Play-off.

==== Results summary ====
Overall								Home						Away					
Pld	W	D	L	GF	GA	GD	Pts	W	D	L	GF	GA	GD	W	D	L	GF	GA	GD
22	7	6	9	23	32	−9	27	5	3	3	14	13	+1	2	3	6	9	19	−10

Last updated: 18 January 2025.
Source: soccerway

==== Results by round ====
Round	1	2	3	4	5	6	7	8	9	10	11	12	13	14	15	16	17	18	19	20	21	22	23	24
Ground	A	H	H	A	H	A	H	A	H	A	H	A	H	H	A	A	H	A	H	A	H	A	A	H
Result	L	L	W	D	W	L	L	L	D	L	D	W	W	L	L	L	D	D	W	D	W	W		
Position	16	15	10	12	9	13	13	15	14	15	15	15	12	14	14	15	15	14	13	13	12	12		

Updated to match(es) played on 18 January 2025. Source:
A = Away; H = Home; W = Win; D = Draw; L = Loss

==== Matches ====
The match schedule was released on 11 June 2024.

28 July 2024 1	Westerlo	3–0	Cercle Brugge	Westerlo

4 August 2024 2	Cercle Brugge	1–2	Kortrijk	Bruges
				Stadium: Jan Breydel Stadium

1 September 2024 6	Club Brugge	3–0	Cercle Brugge	Bruges
13:30	Mechele 39'; Tzolis 45+3'; Skov Olsen 55'			Stadium: Jan Breydel Stadium; Attendance: 24,400; Referee: Jasper Vergoote

22 September 2024 8	Mechelen	2–0	Cercle Brugge	Mechelen
16:00	Foulon 32'; Van den Eynden 86'			Stadium: AFAS Stadion

26 September 2024 5	Cercle Brugge	2–1	Gent	Bruges
				Stadium: Jan Breydel Stadium

29 September 2024 9	Cercle Brugge	1–1	Sint-Truiden	Bruges
19:15 CET	Denkey 34'; Miangué (yellow card) 87'	Report	Coppens (yellow card) 54'; Bertaccini (yellow card) 68'; Ferrari 89'; Brahimi (yellow card) 90+6'	Stadium: Jan Breydel Stadium; Attendance: 4,592; Referee: (Belgium) Wim Smet

6 October 2024 10	Antwerp	3–0	Cercle Brugge	Antwerp
16:00 CEST (UTC+2)	Kerk 19'; Chery 23'; Ondrejka (yellow card) 36', (goal) 83'		Van der Bruggen (yellow card) 17'; Miangue (yellow card) 48'; Ravych (yellow card) 75'	Stadium: Bosuilstadion; Attendance: 12,500; Referee: Nicolas Laforge

19 October 2024 11	Cercle Brugge	0–0	Dender	Bruges
18:15 CEST (UTC+2)	Kakou (yellow card) 65'; Miangué (yellow card) 90+3'	Report	Pupe (yellow card) 10'; Scheidler (yellow card) 21'; Soladio (yellow card) 89' (yellow-red card) 90+3'	Stadium: Jan Breydel Stadium; Attendance: 4,859; Referee: (Belgium) Bert Put

27 October 2024 12	Union Saint-Gilloise	1–3	Cercle Brugge	Brussels
19:15 CEST	Fuseini 8'; David (yellow card) 88'; Sykes (yellow card) 90+6'	Report	Augusto 52'; Kakou 55'; Nazinho (yellow card) 64'; Somers (yellow card) 73'; Denkey 90+8', (yellow card) 90+9'	Stadium: Joseph Marien Stadium

3 November 2024 13	Cercle Brugge	2–0	Sporting Charleroi	Bruges
16:00 CET	Minda (yellow card) 43'; Kakou (yellow card) 62'; Denkey 67'; Van der Bruggen 72'; Utkus (yellow card) 82'	Report	Camara (yellow card) 29'; Zorgane (yellow card) 86'; Bernier (yellow card) 90+1'	Stadium: Jan Breydel Stadium; Attendance: 6,519; Referee: (Belgium) Jasper Vergoote

10 November 2024 14	Cercle Brugge	0–5	Anderlecht	Bruges
13:30	Diakité (red card) 82'; Delanghe (yellow card) 90'	Report	Dolberg 19', 62' (pen.), 75'; N'Diaye (yellow card) 27'; Verschaeren (yellow card) 54'; Leoni 72'; Stroeykens (yellow card) 83'; Vázquez 90'	Stadium: Jan Breydel Stadium; Attendance: 8,640; Referee: Wesli De Cremer

23 November 2024 15	Standard Liège	1–0	Cercle Brugge	Liège
18:15 CET	Zeqiri 57'	Report	Flávio Nazinho (yellow card) 6'; Denkey (yellow card) 42'	Stadium: Stade Maurice Dufrasne; Attendance: 14,453; Referee: (Belgium) Simon Bourdeaud'hui

1 December 2024 16	Beerschot	3–2	Cercle Brugge	Antwerp
16:00 CET	Omar Fayed (yellow card) 45+3'; Dagba (yellow card) 52'; Henderson 54'; Verlinden (yellow card) 65'; Mbe Soh 81'; Colassin 88'	Report	Kakou (yellow card) 23'; Denkey 36' 45+3' (pen.) (yellow card) 71'; Utkus (red card) 79'	Stadium: Olympisch Stadion; Attendance: 4,775; Referee: (Belgium) Kevin Van Damme

8 December 2024 17	Cercle Brugge	0–0	Union Saint-Gilloise	Brugge
16:00 CET	Van der Bruggen (yellow card) 29'; Somers (yellow card) 36'; Magnée (red card) 72'; Kakou (yellow card) 90+7'	Report	Mac Allister (yellow card) 62'; Leysen (yellow card) 90+4'	Stadium: Jan Breydel Stadium; Attendance: 4,816; Referee: (Belgium) Lothar D'Hondt

15 December 2024 18	Gent	1–1	Cercle Brugge	Ghent
19:15 CET	Sonko 24'; Gandelman (yellow card) 70'	Report	Denkey 71'	Stadium: Planet Group Arena; Attendance: 12,342; Referee: (Belgium) Jan Boterberg

22 December 2024 19	Cercle Brugge	1–0	OH Leuven	Brugge
19:15 CET	Somers (yellow card) 39'; Nils De Wilde (yellow card) 90+1'; Olaigbe 90+10' (pen.)	Report	Ricca (yellow card) 39'; Akimoto (yellow card) 90+1'	Stadium: Jan Breydel Stadium; Attendance: 4,686; Referee: (Belgium) Michiel Allaerts

27 December 2024 20	Sint-Truiden	1–1	Cercle Brugge	Sint-Truiden
20:45 CET	Ogawa (yellow card) 37'; Van Helden 72'; Fujita (yellow card) 90+2'	Report	Olaigbe 17'; Utkus (yellow card) 67'; Agyekum (yellow card) 87'	Stadium: Daio Wasabi Stayen Stadium; Attendance: 5,454; Referee: (Belgium) Bram Van Driessche

12 January 2025 21	Cercle Brugge	1–0	Mechelen	Brugge
19:15 CET	Felipe Augusto 34'	Report	Raman (yellow card) 90+1'	Stadium: Jan Breydel Stadium; Attendance: 4,423; Referee: (Belgium) Wim Smet

18 January 2025 22	Dender	0–1	Cercle Brugge	Denderleeuw
16:00 CET	Hrnčár (red card) 9'; Kobe Cools (yellow card) 83'; Scheidler (yellow card) 90+7'	Report	Diakité 28'; Francis (yellow card) 75'	Stadium: Dender Football Complex; Attendance: 2,776; Referee: (Belgium) Erik Lambrechts

25 January 2025 23	Sporting Charleroi	–	Cercle Brugge	Charleroi
18:15 CET				Stadium: Stade du Pays de Charleroi

1 February 2025 24	Cercle Brugge	–	Standard Liège	Brugge
18:15 CET				Stadium: Jan Breydel Stadium

8 February 2025 25	Genk	2–1	Cercle Brugge

16 February 2025 26	Cercle Brugge	1–1	Westerlo

23 February 2025 27	Kortrijk	1–1	Cercle Brugge

1 March 2025 28	Cercle Brugge	0–0	Antwerp

9 March 2025 29	Cercle Brugge	1–3	Club Brugge

16 March 2025 30	Anderlecht	3–0	Cercle Brugge

==== Relegation play-offs ====
Pos	Team	Pld	W	D	L	GF	GA	GD	Pts	Qualification or relegation	STR	CER	KOR	BEE
1	Sint-Truiden	6	3	1	2	9	10	−1	41			3–1	0–3	2–1
2	Cercle Brugge (O)	6	2	1	3	10	13	−3	39	Qualification for the promotion/relegation play-offs	3–1		0–2	2–1
3	Kortrijk (R)	6	3	2	1	12	8	+4	37	Relegation to Challenger Pro League	2–2	2–2		3–2
4	Beerschot (R)	6	2	0	4	10	10	0	24	Relegation to Challenger Pro League	0–1	4–2	2–0	

Source: Jupiler Pro League (in Dutch), Soccerway
Legend: Blue = home team win; Yellow = draw; Red = away team win.
Rules for classification: 1) Points; 2) Regular season finishing position.
(O) Play-off winners; (R) Relegated

30 March 2025 1	Kortrijk	2–2	Cercle Brugge

5 April 2025 2	Cercle Brugge	2–1	Beerschot

12 April 2025 3	Sint-Truiden	3–1	Cercle Brugge

26 April 2025 4	Cercle Brugge	3–1	Sint-Truiden

3 May 2025 5	Cercle Brugge	0–2	Kortrijk

10 May 2025 6	Beerschot	4–2	Cercle Brugge

===== Promotion/relegation play-offs =====
18 May 2025 First leg	Patro Eisden	1–5	Cercle Brugge

23 May 2025 Second leg	Cercle Brugge	3–1 (8–2 agg.)	Patro Eisden

=== Belgian Cup ===
31 October 2024 Seventh round	Cercle Brugge	3–0	Olympic Charleroi	Bruges
20:00 CET	Nunes 23'; Francis 35'; Magnée 89'			Stadium: Jan Breydel Stadium

4 December 2024 Eighth round	Cercle Brugge	0–1	Sint-Truiden	Bruges
20:30 CET		Report	Ferrari 11'	Stadium: Jan Breydel Stadium

=== UEFA Europa League ===
==== Second qualifying round ====
The draw was held on 19 June 2024.

25 July 2024 First leg	Kilmarnock (Scotland)	1–1	(Belgium) Cercle Brugge	Rugby Park, Kilmarnock
20:30 (19:30 BST)	Watson 70'	Report	Olaigbe 55'	Attendance: 10,410; Referee: Martin Dohal (Slovakia)

1 August 2024 Second leg	Cercle Brugge (Belgium)	1–0 (2–1 agg.)	(Scotland) Kilmarnock	Jan Breydel Stadium, Bruges
20:00	Somers 21'	Report		Attendance: 10,230; Referee: Ante Čulina (Croatia)

==== Third qualifying round ====
8 August 2024 First leg	Molde (Norway)	3–0	(Belgium) Cercle Brugge	Aker Stadion, Molde
19:00	Eriksen 3'; Eikrem 18'; Linnes 30'	Report		Attendance: 4,200; Referee: Luis Godinho (Portugal)

15 August 2024 Second leg	Cercle Brugge (Belgium)	1–0 (1–3 agg.)	(Norway) Molde	Jan Breydel Stadium, Bruges
20:00	Ouattara 41'	Report		Attendance: 4,504; Referee: Balázs Berke (Hungary)

=== UEFA Conference League ===
Win Draw Loss Fixtures

==== Play-off round ====
22 August 2024 First leg	Wisła Kraków (Poland)	1–6	(Belgium) Cercle Brugge	Henryk Reyman Stadium, Kraków
20:30	Rodado 85'	Report	Minda 8'; Somers 10'; Ravych 36'; Denkey 47'; Ouattara 56'; Olaigbe 83'	Attendance: 25,093; Referee: Philip Farrugia (Malta)

29 August 2024 Second leg	Cercle Brugge (Belgium)	1–4 (7–5 agg.)	(Poland) Wisła Kraków	Jan Breydel Stadium, Bruges
20:00	Felipe Augusto 77'	Report	Uryga 15'; Kiss 18'; Gogół 73'; Zwoliński 90+4'	Attendance: 5,654; Referee: Horațiu Feșnic (Romania)

==== League phase ====
The league phase draw was held on 30 August 2024.

Pos	Team	Pld	W	D	L	GF	GA	GD	Pts	Qualification
6	(Swiss Football Association) Lugano	6	4	1	1	11	7	+4	13 (Note: Away goals scored: Djurgårdens IF 5, Lugano 4.)	Advance to round of 16 (seeded)
7	(Polish Football Association) Legia Warsaw	6	4	0	2	13	5	+8	12	Advance to round of 16 (seeded)
8	(Royal Belgian Football Association) Cercle Brugge	6	3	2	1	14	7	+7	11	Advance to round of 16 (seeded)
9	(Polish Football Association) Jagiellonia Białystok	6	3	2	1	10	5	+5	11	Advance to knockout phase play-offs (seeded)
10	(Football Association of Ireland) Shamrock Rovers	6	3	2	1	12	9	+3	11	Advance to knockout phase play-offs (seeded)

Source: UEFA
Rules for classification: League phase tiebreakers
Notes:

Round	1	2	3	4	5	6
Ground	H	A	H	A	A	H
Result	W	L	D	W	W	D
Position	1	12	15	11	7	8
Points	3	3	4	7	10	11

Updated to match(es) played on 19 December 2024. Source: UEFA
A = Away; H = Home; W = Win; D = Draw; L = Loss

Win Draw Loss Fixtures

3 October 2024 1	Cercle Brugge (Belgium)	6–2	(Switzerland) St. Gallen	Jan Breydel Stadium, Bruges
18:45	Minda 3'; Denkey 25', 43', 54' (pen.); Magnée 63', 68'	Report	Csoboth 58'; Mambimbi 81'	Attendance: 5,195; Referee: Arda Kardeşler (Turkey)

24 October 2024 2	Víkingur Reykjavík (Iceland)	3–1	(Belgium) Cercle Brugge	Kópavogsvöllur, Kópavogur (Note: Víkingur Reykjavík will play their home matches at Kópavogsvöllur, Kópavogur, instead of their regular stadium, Víkingsvöllur, Reykjavík, which did not meet UEFA requirements.)
21:00 (19:00 UTC+0)	Sigurpálsson 17'; Djuric 76'; Vatnhamar 83'	Report	Olaigbe 16'	Attendance: 1,200; Referee: Vitālijs Spasjoņņikovs (Latvia)

7 November 2024 3	LASK (Austria)	0–0	(Belgium) Cercle Brugge	Raiffeisen Arena, Linz
21:00		Report		Attendance: 8,500; Referee: Radoslav Gidzhenov (Bulgaria)

28 November 2024 4	Cercle Brugge (Belgium)	2–0	(Scotland) Heart of Midlothian	Jan Breydel Stadium, Bruges
18:45	Efekele 40'; Magnée 90'	Report		Attendance: 7,722; Referee: Elchin Masiyev (Azerbaijan)

12 December 2024 5	Olimpija Ljubljana (Slovenia)	1–4	(Belgium) Cercle Brugge	Stožice Stadium, Ljubljana
18:45	Blanco 5'	Report	Olaigbe 2', 81'; Felipe Augusto 24'; Denkey 72'	Attendance: 5,646; Referee: Adam Ladebäck (Sweden)

19 December 2024 6	Cercle Brugge (Belgium)	1–1	(Turkey) İstanbul Başakşehir	Jan Breydel Stadium, Bruges
21:00	Magnée (yellow card) 30'; Brunner 82'	Report	Şengezer (yellow card) 35'; Ergün (yellow card) 45+1'; Ba (yellow card) 69'; Piątek 74'	Attendance: 4,411; Referee: (Hungary) István Vad

== Notes ==
2. Tie reversed after the original draw. Despite having adequate facilities, the city council of the city of Charleroi did not approve and hence the match was played in Bruges.
