= 2023–24 Royal Antwerp FC season =

Royal Antwerp F.C.
2023–24 season
- Manager: Mark van Bommel
- Stadium: Bosuilstadion
- Pro League: 6th
- Belgian Cup: Runners-up
- Belgian Super Cup: Winners
- UEFA Champions League: Group stage
- Top goalscorer: League: Vincent Janssen (11); All: Vincent Janssen (17)
- Average home league attendance: 13,141
Home colours	Away colours	Third colours

The 2023–24 season was Royal Antwerp Sporting Club's 144th season in existence and seventh consecutive in the Belgian Pro League. They also competed in the Belgian Cup and the Belgian Super Cup, as well as the UEFA Champions League for the first time.

== Players ==
=== First-team squad ===
As of 9 February 2024

Note: Flags indicate national team as defined under FIFA eligibility rules; some limited exceptions apply. Players may hold more than one non-FIFA nationality.

No.	Pos.	Nation	Player
1	GK	FRA	Jean Butez
2	DF	BEL	Ritchie De Laet
3	DF	BEL	Björn Engels
5	DF	NED	Owen Wijndal (on loan from AFC Ajax)
6	MF	BEL	Eliot Matazo (on loan from AS Monaco)
7	FW	SUR	Gyrano Kerk (on loan from Lokomotiv Moscow)
8	MF	NGR	Alhassan Yusuf
9	FW	NGR	George Ilenikhena
10	FW	BEL	Michel-Ange Balikwisha
17	FW	SWE	Jacob Ondrejka
18	FW	NED	Vincent Janssen
19	FW	NGR	Chidera Ejuke (on loan from CSKA Moscow)
23	DF	BEL	Toby Alderweireld (captain)

No.	Pos.	Nation	Player
24	MF	NED	Jurgen Ekkelenkamp
27	MF	BEL	Mandela Keita (on loan from OH Leuven)
33	DF	BEL	Zeno Van Den Bosch
34	DF	BEL	Jelle Bataille
44	DF	FRA	Soumaïla Coulibaly (on loan from Borussia Dortmund)
46	MF	BEL	Milan Smits
55	FW	ECU	Anthony Valencia
84	MF	MLI	Mahamadou Doumbia
87	GK	BEL	Davino Verhulst
91	GK	BEL	Senne Lammens
—	MF	NIG	Moustapha Amadou Sabo (on loan from Hammarby IF)
—	DF	BEL	Dorian Dessoleil

=== Out on loan ===
Note: Flags indicate national team as defined under FIFA eligibility rules; some limited exceptions apply. Players may hold more than one non-FIFA nationality.

No.	Pos.	Nation	Player
30	MF	GER	Christopher Scott (at Hannover 96)
50	DF	KOS	Laurit Krasniqi (at Roda JC Kerkrade)
80	MF	BEL	Pierre Dwomoh (at RWDM)

== Transfers ==
=== In ===
Pos.	Player	Transferred from	Fee	Date	Source
MF	(Belgium) Eliot Matazo	(France) AS Monaco	On loan	1 February 2024	
MF	(Mali) Mahamadou Doumbia	(Mali) JMG Academy Bamako	Undisclosed	6 September 2023	
DF	(Netherlands) Owen Wijndal	(Netherlands) AFC Ajax	On loan	5 September 2023	
DF	(Niger) Mamane Moustapha Amadou Sabo	(Sweden) Hammarby IF	On loan	24 August 2023	
DF	(France) Soumaïla Coulibaly	(Germany) Borussia Dortmund	On loan	11 August 2023	
MF	(Belgium) Mandela Keita	(Belgium) OH Leuven	On loan	10 August 2023	
FW	(Nigeria) Chidera Ejuke	(Russia) CSKA Moscow	On loan	30 July 2023	
FW	(Suriname) Gyrano Kerk	(Russia) FC Lokomotiv Moscow	On loan	5 July 2023	
FW	(Nigeria) George Ilenikhena	(France) Amiens	€ 6,000,000	1 July 2023	
GK	(Belgium) Senne Lammens	(Belgium) Club Brugge	Free	1 July 2023	
FW	(Sweden) Jacob Ondrejka	(Sweden) Elfsborg	€ 1,700,000	1 July 2023	

=== Out ===
Pos.	Player	Transferred to	Fee	Date	Source
FW	(Kosovo) Arbnor Muja	(Turkey) Samsunspor	€ 2,000,000	9 February 2024	
FW	(Switzerland) Michael Frey	(England) Queens Park Rangers	Undisclosed	28 January 2024	
MF	(Belgium) Arthur Vermeeren	(Spain) Atlético Madrid	€ 18,000,000	26 January 2024	
DF	(United States) Sam Vines	(United States) Colorado Rapids	Undisclosed	22 January 2024	
GK	(Belgium) Ortwin De Wolf	(Belgium) Zulte Waregem	€ 300,000	9 January 2024	
MF	(Belgium) Birger Verstraete	(Greece) Aris Thessaloniki	Undisclosed	11 September 2023	
MF	(Cameroon) Frank Boya	(France) Amiens SC	€ 3,000,000	1 September 2023	
DF	(Argentina) Gastón Ávila	(Netherlands) AFC Ajax	€ 12,500,000	22 August 2023	
FW	(Denmark) Viktor Fischer		Contract terminated	30 June 2023	
DF	(Ecuador) Willian Pacho	(Germany) Eintracht Frankfurt	€ 13,650,000	30 June 2023	
MF	(Belgium) Alexis De Sart	(Belgium) RWDM	€ 500,000	30 June 2023	
FW	(Japan) Koji Miyoshi	(England) Birmingham City	End of contract	30 June 2023	
MF	(Belgium) Pieter Gerkens	(Belgium) AA Gent	End of contract	30 June 2023	
MF	(Belgium) Faris Haroun		Retired	30 June 2023	

== Pre-season and friendlies ==
The team will start preparations with a test match versus second-tier side Lierse on 1 July behind closed doors.

1 July 2023 Friendly	Antwerp (Belgium)	1–1	(Belgium) Lierse Kempenzonen	Antwerp, Belgium
11:30	Ilenikhena 66' (pen.)		Yasser 77'	Stadium: Bosuilstadion; Attendance: 0

8 July 2023 Friendly	Antwerp (Belgium)	0–3	(Greece) AEK Athens	Antwerp, Belgium
13:45			van Weert 56'; Zine 61'; Kosidis 81'	Stadium: Bosuilstadion; Attendance: 0
Note: Four periods of 30 minutes.

16 July 2023 Friendly	Antwerp (Belgium)	1–0	(Germany) Hertha BSC	Saalfelden (Austria)
	Balikwisha 52'			Stadium: 1508 Saalfelden Arena; Attendance: 0

9 October 2023 Friendly	Antwerp (Belgium)	1–1	(Belgium) Sint-Truiden
13:00 CEST (UTC+2)	Valencia		Zahiroleslam 80'

== Competitions ==
=== Overall record ===
Competition	First match	Last match	Starting round	Final position	Record							
Competition	First match	Last match	Starting round	Final position	Pld	W	D	L	GF	GA	GD	Win %
Belgian Pro League Regular season	28 July 2023	26 May 2024	Matchday 1		30	14	10	6	55	27	+28	46.67
Champions' Play-offs	30 March 2024	26 May 2024	Matchday 1		8	1	0	7	4	16	−12	12.50
Belgian Cup	1 November 2023	9 May 2024	Seventh round	Runner-up	6	4	1	1	16	7	+9	66.67
Belgian Super Cup	23 July 2023			Winners	1	0	1	0	1	1	+0	0.00
UEFA Champions League	22 August 2023	13 December 2023	Play-off round		8	3	0	5	9	18	−9	37.50
Total					53	22	12	19	85	69	+16	41.51

Last updated: 12 May 2024
Source: Soccerway

=== Belgian Pro League ===
==== League table ====
Pos	Team	Pld	W	D	L	GF	GA	GD	Pts	Qualification or relegation
1	Union SG	30	21	7	2	63	31	+32	70	Qualification for the Europa League and champions' play-offs (Note: The regular season winner qualified for the 2024–25 UEFA Europa League if not earning 2024–25 UEFA Champions League in the play-off.)
2	Anderlecht	30	18	9	3	58	30	+28	63	Qualification for the champions' play-offs
3	Antwerp	30	14	10	6	55	27	+28	52	Qualification for the champions' play-offs
4	Club Brugge	30	14	9	7	62	29	+33	51	Qualification for the champions' play-offs
5	Cercle Brugge	30	14	5	11	44	34	+10	47	Qualification for the champions' play-offs

Source: Jupiler Pro League (in Dutch), Soccerway
Rules for classification: 1) Points; 2) Matches won; 3) Goal difference; 4) Goals scored; 5) Away matches won; 6) Away goal difference; 7) Away goals scored; 8) Play-off.

==== Results summary ====
Overall								Home						Away					
Pld	W	D	L	GF	GA	GD	Pts	W	D	L	GF	GA	GD	W	D	L	GF	GA	GD
30	14	10	6	55	27	+28	52	9	6	1	34	10	+24	5	4	5	21	17	+4

Last updated: 17 March 2024.

==== Results by round ====
Round	1	2	3	4	5	6	7	8	9	10	11	12	13	14	15	16	17	18	19	20	21	22	23	24	25	26	27	28	29	30
Ground	H	A	H	A	H	A	A	H	A	H	A	A	H	H	A	H	A	H	H	A	H	A	A	H	A	H	A	H	A	H
Result	W	L	W	D	D	D	W	D	D	W	L	L	W	W	D	W	W	D	D	L	W	L	W	W	W	L	D	W	W	D
Position	4	8	4	5	5	8	5	6	5	4	6	7	6	5	5	4	4	4	5	6	6	6	5	4	4	4	4	4	4	3

Updated to match(es) played on 17 March 2024. Source:
A = Away; H = Home; W = Win; D = Draw; L = Loss

==== Matches ====
The league fixtures were announced on 22 June 2023.

30 July 2023 1	Antwerp	1–0	Cercle Brugge	Antwerp
13:30 CEST (UTC+2)	Daland 45+1' (o.g.)	Report	Ravych (yellow card) 58'; Francis (yellow card) 72'	Stadium: Bosuilstadion; Attendance: 12,277; Referee: Jonathan Lardot

6 August 2023 2	Anderlecht	1–0	Antwerp	Anderlecht
13:30 CEST (UTC+2)	Dolberg 45+5' (pen.); Patris (yellow card) 90+3'	Report	Balikwisha (yellow card) 38'	Stadium: Lotto Park; Referee: Jasper Vergoote

11 August 2023 3	Antwerp	6–0	Kortrijk	Antwerp
20:45 CEST (UTC+2)	Janssen 10', 36', 58'; Wasinski 22' (o.g.); Kerk 44'; Muja 67'	Report	Wasinski (yellow card) 48'; Mbayo (yellow card) 53'	Stadium: Bosuilstadion; Attendance: 15,447; Referee: Jan Boterberg

18 August 2023 4	OH Leuven	1–1	Antwerp	Leuven
20:45 CEST (UTC+2)	Vlietinck (yellow card) 25'; Mendyl (yellow card) 48' (yellow-red card) 87'; Sagrado 82', (yellow card) 90+4'	Report	Janssen (yellow card) 27', (goal) 34'; Vermeeren (yellow card) 43'	Stadium: Den Dreef; Attendance: 6,595; Referee: Lawrence Visser

3 September 2023 6	Union SG	2–2	Antwerp	Saint-Gilles
16:00 CEST (UTC+2)	Eckert 4' (pen.); Nilsson 87' (pen.); Amoura (yellow card) 90+4'	Report	Coulibaly (yellow card) 7'; Vines 23'; Ekkelenkamp 44'; Vermeeren (yellow card) 81'	Stadium: Joseph Marien Stadium; Attendance: 6,890; Referee: Jan Boterberg

15 September 2023 7	Westerlo	0–3	Antwerp	Westerlo
20:45 CEST (UTC+2)	Bayram (yellow card) 18'; Sydorchuk (yellow card) 47'; Van den Keybus (yellow card) 72'	Report	Janssen 16'; Bataille 68'; Muja 84'	Stadium: Het Kuipje; Attendance: 7,300; Referee: Lothar D'hondt

23 September 2023 8	Antwerp	0–0	RWD Molenbeek	Antwerp
20:45 CEST (UTC+2)		Report	Reine-Adelaide (yellow card) 90+6'	Stadium: Bosuilstadion; Attendance: 12,682; Referee: Wim Smet

27 September 2023 5	Antwerp	0–0	Gent	Antwerp
20:45 CEST (UTC+2)	Muja (yellow card) 44'; Kerk (yellow card) 45'; Ekkelenkamp (yellow card) 82'		Torunarigha (yellow card) 54'	Stadium: Bosuilstadion; Attendance: 13,077; Referee: Nicolas Laforge
Note: The match scheduled for 26 August 2023 was postponed due to the UEFA Champions League play-offs.

30 September 2023 9	KV Mechelen	0–0	Antwerp	Mechelen
20:45 CEST (UTC+2)			Janssen (yellow card) 64'	Stadium: Achter de Kazerne; Attendance: 14,963; Referee: Jan Boterberg

8 October 2023 10	Antwerp	4–1	Eupen	Antwerp
16:00 CEST (UTC+2)	Vermeeren 14'; Balikwisha 33'; Paeshuyse 61' (o.g.); Muja 90'		Nuhu 11'; Baiye (yellow card) 74'; Magnée (yellow card) 84'	Stadium: Bosuilstadion; Attendance: 12,100; Referee: Bram Van Driessche

21 October 2023 11	Charleroi	3–2	Antwerp	Charleroi
20:45 CEST (UTC+2)	Knezevic (yellow card) 16'; Štulić 50'; Ilaimaharitra (yellow card) 60', (goal) 65' (pen.), 88' (pen.)		Ekkelenkamp 56'; Ilenikhena 77'; Balikwisha (yellow card) 86'; Alderweireld (yellow card) 90+2'	Stadium: Stade du Pays de Charleroi; Attendance: 7,700; Referee: Wesli De Cremer

29 October 2023 12	Club Brugge	2–1	Antwerp	Bruges
13:30 CEST (UTC+2)	Nielsen (yellow card) 35'; Mechele (yellow card) 38'; Jutglà 45'; Skov Olsen (yellow card) 69'; Vanaken 90'; De Cuyper (yellow card) 90+3'		Yusuf (yellow card) 15'; Ilenikhena 72'	Stadium: Jan Breydel Stadium; Attendance: 23,724; Referee: Bram Van Driessche

4 November 2023 13	Antwerp	3–2	Genk	Antwerp
20:45 CET (UTC+1)	Janssen 5', (yellow card) 47'; Balikwisha 11', 39'; Muja (yellow card) 51'; Yusuf (yellow card) 68'		Zeqiri 45'; Paintsil (yellow card) 45+2'; Hrošovský (yellow card) 45+5'; El Khannous (yellow card) 68'; Bonsu Baah (yellow card) 90+2'; Muñoz 90+9'	Stadium: Bosuilstadion; Attendance: 16,071; Referee: Lothar D'hondt

11 November 2023 14	Antwerp	6–0	Standard Liège	Antwerp
16:00 CET (UTC+1)	Janssen 4', 14' (pen.); Ekkelenkamp 33'; Muja 41'; Bataille (yellow card) 49'; Ilenikhena 74'; Balikwisha 86'; Van den Bosch (yellow card) 89'		Vanheusden (yellow card) 38'; Djenepo (yellow card) 78'	Stadium: Bosuilstadion; Attendance: 14,000; Referee: Jonathan Lardot

24 November 2023 15	STVV	1–1	Antwerp	Sint-Truiden
20:45 CET (UTC+1)	Steuckers 42'; Godeau (yellow card) 46'; Koita (yellow card) 63'		Ejuke 81'; Kerk (yellow card) 90+1'; Janssen (yellow card) 90+6'	Stadium: Stayen; Attendance: 7,024; Referee: Bert Put

2 December 2023 16	Antwerp	1–0	OH Leuven	Antwerp
20:45 CET (UTC+1)	Balikwisha 44'		Schrijvers (yellow card) 57'; Mendyl (yellow card) 72'; N'Dri (yellow card) 88'	Stadium: Bosuilstadion; Attendance: 12,000; Referee: Brent Staessens

9 December 2023 17	Cercle Brugge	1–3	Antwerp	Bruges
16:00 CET (UTC+1)	Utkus (yellow card) 38'; Daland (yellow card) 45+4'; Denkey 70'; Ravych (yellow card) 75'; Somers (yellow card) 86'		Ekkelenkamp 20'; Ejuke 57'; Ilenikhena 90+7', (yellow card) 90+8'	Stadium: Jan Breydel Stadium; Attendance: 4,178; Referee: Nathan Verboomen

17 December 2023 18	Antwerp	1–1	Anderlecht	Antwerp
18:30 CET (UTC+1)	Ilenikhena (yellow card) 67', (goal) 89'; Ekkelenkamp (yellow card) 70'		Leoni 8'; Augustinsson (yellow card) 17'; Vertonghen (yellow card) 67'; Dreyer (yellow card) 70'; Debast (yellow card) 90+2'	Stadium: Bosuilstadion; Attendance: 15,000; Referee: Erik Lambrechts

23 December 2023 19	Antwerp	2–2	Westerlo	Antwerp
18:15 CET (UTC+1)	Muja 45+1'; Ekkelenkamp (yellow card) 57'; Alderweireld 85', (yellow card) 90+5'		Stassin 71', 77'; Jordanov (yellow card) 74'	Stadium: Bosuilstadion; Attendance: 12,765; Referee: Bram Van Driessche

26 December 2023 20	Genk	3–0	Antwerp	Genk
13:30 CET (UTC+1)	Fadera 10'; Arokodare 75', 77'; Arteaga (yellow card) 83'		De Laet (yellow card) 23'; Keita (yellow card) 47'; Coulibaly (yellow card) 66'	Stadium: Cegeka Arena; Attendance: 20,567; Referee: Jonathan Lardot

21 January 2024 21	Antwerp	4–1	Charleroi	Antwerp
13:30 CET (UTC+1)	Janssen 19'; Ilenikhena 41'; Wijndal 65'; Ekkelenkamp 76'; Kerk (yellow card) 87'		Ilaimaharitra (yellow card) 43'; Mbenza (yellow card) 58'; Bernier 85'	Stadium: Bosuilstadion; Attendance: 16,000; Referee: Erik Lambrechts

28 January 2024 22	Eupen	1–0	Antwerp	Eupen
16:00 CET (UTC+1)	Baiye 31'; Finnbogason (yellow card) 45'; Davidson (yellow card) 68'; Emond (yellow card) 81'; Keita (yellow card) 90+2'		Janssen (yellow card) 45+2'; Van den Bosch (yellow card) 54'	Stadium: Kehrwegstadion; Attendance: 3,146; Referee: Wesli De Cremer

31 January 2024 23	Standard Liège	0–1	Antwerp	Liège
21:00 CET (UTC+1)	Laifis (yellow card) 76'		Keita (yellow card) 40' (yellow-red card) 88'; Doumbia 63'; Ejuke (yellow card) 86'	Stadium: Stade Maurice Dufrasne; Attendance: 18,123; Referee: Bram Van Driessche

4 February 2024 24	Antwerp	2–1	Club Brugge	Antwerp
13:30 CET (UTC+1)	Janssen (yellow card) 19'; Corbanie 86'; Ondrejka 90+9'; Muja (yellow card) 90+12'		Vetlesen (yellow card) 25'; Skóraś (yellow card) 27'; Thiago (yellow card) 45'; De Cuyper 54'; Vanaken (red card) 90+13'	Stadium: Bosuilstadion; Attendance: 16,000; Referee: Jasper Vergoote

11 February 2024 25	RWD Molenbeek	0–4	Antwerp	Molenbeek-Saint-Jean
13:30 CET (UTC+1)	Sampaio (yellow card) 40' (yellow-red card) 66'; Gueye (yellow card) 71'		Alderweireld 15' (pen.), 63' (pen.); Janssen 36'; Ondrejka 45+1'	Stadium: Edmond Machtens Stadium; Attendance: 6,248; Referee: Jonathan Lardot

17 February 2024 26	Antwerp	0–1	KV Mechelen	Antwerp
20:45 CET (UTC+1)	Ejuke (yellow card) 49'; Ondrejka (yellow card) 53'		Mukau (yellow card) 42'; Slimani (yellow card) 45+2'; Mrabti 57'	Stadium: Bosuilstadion; Attendance: 16,000; Referee: Wesli De Cremer

25 February 2024 27	Gent	2–2	Antwerp	Ghent
16:00 CET (UTC+1)	Alderweireld 16' (o.g.); Gerkens 28'; Kandouss (yellow card) 49'		Ondrejka 25' (pen.), (yellow card) 71'; Bataille (yellow card) 49'; Ilenikhena 84'	Stadium: Ghelamco Arena; Attendance: 17,263; Referee: Jasper Vergoote

3 March 2024 28	Antwerp	3–0	STVV	Antwerp
16:00 CET (UTC+1)	Ondrejka 62' (pen.), 87'; Ejuke 74'			Stadium: Bosuilstadion; Attendance: 15,500; Referee: Kevin Van Damme

9 March 2024 29	Kortrijk	0–1	Antwerp	Kortrijk
16:00 CET (UTC+1)			Ilenikhena 31'; Van den Bosch (yellow card) 40'	Stadium: Guldensporen Stadion; Attendance: 8,062; Referee: Bert Put

17 March 2024 30	Antwerp	1–1	Union SG	Antwerp
16:00 CET (UTC+1)	Bataille (yellow card) 52'; Van den Bosch (yellow card) 67'; Ejuke (yellow card) 82'; Kerk 90+2'		Machida (yellow card) 48' (yellow-red card) 72'; Puertas (yellow card) 60'; Burgess (yellow card) 77'; Nilsson 84', (yellow card) 90+8'	Stadium: Bosuilstadion; Attendance: 15,000; Referee: Bram Van Driessche

==== Champions' Play-Off ====
Pos	Team	Pld	W	D	L	GF	GA	GD	Pts	Qualification or relegation	CLU	USG	AND	CER	GNK	ANT
1	Club Brugge (C)	10	7	3	0	21	6	+15	50	Qualification for the Champions League league stage	—	2–2	3–1	0–0	4–0	3–0
2	Union SG	10	4	2	4	17	12	+5	49	Qualification for the Champions League third qualifying round	1–2	—	0–0	2–3	2–0	4–1
3	Anderlecht	10	4	2	4	12	12	0	46	Qualification for the Europa League play-off round	0–1	2–1	—	3–0	2–1	1–0
4	Cercle Brugge	10	3	4	3	13	13	0	37	Qualification for the Europa League second qualifying round (Note: Union SG qualified for the Europa League play-off round by winning the 2023–24 Belgian Cup. The Europa League second qualifying spot and the European competition play-off spot were thus passed to the next two highest-placed teams that did not qualify for European competitions.)	1–1	1–2	1–1	—	4–1	0–1
5	Genk	10	4	1	5	8	17	−9	37	Qualification for the European competition play-off	0–3	1–0	2–1	1–1	—	1–0
6	Antwerp	10	2	0	8	7	18	−11	32		1–2	0–3	3–1	1–2	0–1	—

Source: Jupiler Pro League (in Dutch), Soccerway
Legend: Blue = home team win; Yellow = draw; Red = away team win.
Rules for classification: 1) Points; 2) Points without (possible) half points added due to rounding; 3) Regular season finishing position.
(C) Champions

==== Results summary ====
Overall								Home						Away					
Pld	W	D	L	GF	GA	GD	Pts	W	D	L	GF	GA	GD	W	D	L	GF	GA	GD
10	2	0	8	7	18	−11	6	1	0	4	5	9	−4	1	0	4	2	9	−7

Source: Jupiler Pro League

==== Results by round ====
Round	1	2	3	4	5	6	7	8	9	10
Ground	A	H	A	A	H	A	H	H	A	H
Result	L	L	L	W	L	L	L	L	L	W
Position	5	6	6	5	5	6	6	6	6	6

Source: Jupiler Pro League
A = Away; H = Home; W = Win; D = Draw; L = Loss

==== Matches ====
30 March 2024 1	Anderlecht	1–0	Antwerp	Anderlecht
20:45 CEST (UTC+2)	Sardella 52'; Hazard (yellow card) 73'; Delaney (yellow card) 78'		Janssen (yellow card) 19'; Ondrejka (yellow card) 38'; Wijndal (red card) 43'; Ekkelenkamp (yellow card) 79'; Alderweireld (yellow card) 90+4'	Stadium: Lotto Park; Attendance: 21,900; Referee: Jasper Vergoote

6 April 2024 2	Antwerp	0–1	Genk	Antwerp
20:45 CEST (UTC+2)	Janssen (yellow card) 32'; Yusuf (yellow card) 50'; Kerk (yellow card) 89'		El Hadj 44'; El Khannous (yellow card) 50'	Stadium: Bosuilstadion; Attendance: 15,000; Referee: Lothar D'hondt

14 April 2024 3	Club Brugge	3–0	Antwerp	Bruges
13:30 CEST (UTC+2)	Onyedika 44', (yellow card) 51'; Thiago (yellow card) 49'; Skóraś 60'; Zinckernagel 90+6'		Van den Bosch (yellow card) 60'; Balikwisha (yellow card) 81'	Stadium: Jan Breydel Stadium; Attendance: 23,000; Referee: Bram Van Driessche

21 April 2024 4	Cercle Brugge	0–1	Antwerp	Bruges
13:30 CEST (UTC+2)	Francis (yellow card) 76'; Van der Bruggen (yellow card) 78'; Denkey (yellow card) 82'; Daland (yellow card) 87'		Ejuke 66'; Balikwisha (yellow card) 87'	Stadium: Jan Breydel Stadium; Attendance: 10,294; Referee: Nathan Verboomen

25 April 2024 5	Antwerp	0–3	Union SG	Antwerp
20:30 CEST (UTC+2)	Alderweireld (yellow card) 47'; Bataille (yellow card) 58'; Keita (yellow card) 69'		Amoura (yellow card) 16', (goal) 56'; Mac Allister (yellow card) 19'; Rasmussen (yellow card) 36'; Puertas 48', 87'; Castro-Montes (yellow card) 84'	Stadium: Bosuilstadion; Attendance: 12,000; Referee: Nicolas Laforge

28 April 2024 6	Union SG	4–1	Antwerp	Forest
18:30 CEST (UTC+2)	Nilsson 37'; Sadiki (yellow card) 33'; Mac Allister 39'; Puertas 54', 90+3'; Teklab (yellow card) 74'		Janssen 17'; Yusuf (yellow card) 21'; Wijndal (yellow card) 31'; Kerk (yellow card) 34'; De Laet (yellow card) 52'	Stadium: Stade Joseph Marien; Attendance: 8,203; Referee: Wesli De Cremer

5 May 2024 7	Antwerp	1–2	Club Brugge	Antwerp
13:30 CEST (UTC+2)	Janssen (yellow card) 1'; Van den Bosch (yellow card) 55'; Balikwisha 67' (pen.); Coulibaly (yellow card) 90+4'		Alderweireld 48' (o.g.); Skov Olsen 64'; Ordóñez (yellow card) 65'	Stadium: Bosuilstadion; Attendance: 12,000; Referee: Jasper Vergoote

12 May 2024 8	Antwerp	1–2	Cercle Brugge	Antwerp
18:30 CEST (UTC+2)	Kerk 79'; Udoh (yellow card) 90'		Lemaréchal 33'; Denkey 44'; Popović (yellow card) 74'; Augusto (yellow card) 76'	Stadium: Bosuilstadion; Attendance: 9,925; Referee: Bert Put

20 May 2024 9	Genk	1–0	Antwerp	Genk
18:30 CEST (UTC+2)	Zeqiri 28'; Cuesta (yellow card) 65'; El Ouahdi (yellow card) 78'; Sadick (yellow card) 90'		Udoh (yellow card) 90+6'	Stadium: Cegeka Arena; Attendance: 19,419; Referee: Nicolas Laforge

26 May 2024 10	Antwerp	3–1	Anderlecht	Antwerp
18:30 CEST (UTC+2)	Keita (yellow card) 47'; Ekkelenkamp (yellow card) 56'; Matazo 63', (yellow card) 79'; Doumbia 90+3', (yellow card) 90+4'; Balikwisha 90+7'		Dreyer 41'; Patris (yellow card) 90+7'	Stadium: Bosuilstadion; Attendance: 16,500; Referee: Bram Van Driessche

=== Belgian Cup ===
1 November 2023 Seventh round	Lierse Kempenzonen	1–4	Antwerp	Lier
15:45 CET (UTC+1)	Van Acker 28' (pen.); Poelmans (yellow card) 37'; Kireev (yellow card) 90+1'		Alderweireld 15'; Ilenikhena 36'; De Laet 42'; Oulare 65' (o.g.)	Stadium: Herman Vanderpoortenstadion; Attendance: 9,200; Referee: Laurent Willems

6 December 2023 Eighth round	Antwerp	5–2	Charleroi	Antwerp
20:30 CET (UTC+1)	Ejuke 45'; Ilenikhena 57', 76'; Janssen 71', 90+1'		Dabbagh 28'; Heymans 31'; Boukamir (yellow card) 64'	Stadium: Bosuilstadion; Attendance: 12,500; Referee: Jan Boterberg

24 January 2024 Quarter-finals	OH Leuven	2–3	Antwerp	Leuven
20:30 CET (UTC+1)	Maziz 2'; Banzuzi (yellow card) 64'; Maertens 79'; Shlomo (yellow card) 90'		Janssen 8' (pen.), 18', (yellow card) 50' (yellow-red card) 90+3'; Van den Bosch 54'; Ekkelenkamp (yellow card) 74'	Stadium: Den Dreef; Attendance: 5,888; Referee: Bert Put

8 February 2024 Semi-final 1st leg	Oostende	1–1	Antwerp	Ostend
20:00 CET (UTC+1)	Henderson (yellow card) 29', (goal) 37'; Berte (yellow card) 90+4'		Doumbia 24'; Wijndal (yellow card) 72'	Stadium: Diaz Arena; Referee: Nathan Verboomen

29 February 2024 Semi-final 2nd leg	Antwerp	3–0 (4–1 agg.)	Oostende	Antwerp
20:45 CET (UTC+1)	Ilenikhena 16', 88'; Van den Bosch 26'		Dewaele (yellow card) 63'; Pérez (yellow card) 82'	Stadium: Bosuilstadion; Attendance: 15,000; Referee: Erik Lambrechts

9 May 2024 Final	Union SG	1–0	Antwerp	Brussels
15:30 CEST (UTC+2)	Amoura (yellow card) 24'; Machida 45+1'; Burgess (yellow card) 68'; Castro-Montes (yellow card) 90'; Moris (yellow card) 90+1'		Matazo (yellow card) 30'; Janssen (yellow card) 54'; Van den Bosch (yellow card) 88'	Stadium: King Baudouin Stadium; Attendance: 47,000; Referee: Erik Lambrechts

=== Belgian Super Cup ===
23 July 2023 Match	Antwerp	1–1 (a.e.t.) (5–4 p)	Mechelen	Antwerp
18:00 CEST (UTC+2)	Balikwisha 9'; Yusuf (yellow card) 55'; Kerk (yellow card) 58'; Ávila (red card) 69'	Report	Foulon (yellow card) 47'; De Laet 78' (o.g.); Mrabti (yellow card) 85'	Stadium: Bosuilstadion; Attendance: 16,000; Referee: Lawrence Visser
	Penalties
	Vines (penalty missed); Ilenikhena (penalty scored); Van den Bosch (penalty missed); Vermeeren (penalty scored); Alderweireld (penalty scored); Butez (penalty scored); Scott (penalty scored)		(penalty scored) Schoofs; (penalty scored) Mrabti; (penalty missed) Vanlerberghe; (penalty missed) Lauberbach; (penalty scored) Storm; (penalty scored) Ngoy; (penalty missed) Lavalée

=== UEFA Champions League ===
==== Play-off round ====
The draw for the play-off round was held on 7 August 2023.

22 August 2023 First leg	Antwerp (Belgium)	1–0	(Greece) AEK Athens	Antwerp
21:00 UTC+2	Janssen 16'; Bataille (red card) 50'; De Laet (yellow card) 67'; Butez (yellow card) 90+2'	Report	Szymański (yellow card) 25'; Pineda (yellow card) 53'	Stadium: Bosuilstadion; Attendance: 13,376; Referee: François Letexier (France)

30 August 2023 First leg	AEK Athens (Greece)	1–2 (1–3 agg.)	(Belgium) Antwerp	Athens
21:00 UTC+2	Araujo 90'; Mantalos (yellow card) 90+7'	Report	Kerk 73'; Balikwisha 90+5'	Stadium: Agia Sophia Stadium; Attendance: 29,300; Referee: Jesús Gil Manzano (Spain)

==== Group stage ====
The draw for the group stage was held on 31 August 2023.

Pos	Team	Pld	W	D	L	GF	GA	GD	Pts	Qualification	BAR	POR	SHK	ANT
1	(Spain) Barcelona	6	4	0	2	12	6	+6	12 (Note: Head-to-head points: Barcelona 6, Porto 0.)	Advance to knockout phase	—	2–1	2–1	5–0
2	(Portugal) Porto	6	4	0	2	15	8	+7	12	Advance to knockout phase	0–1	—	5–3	2–0
3	(Ukraine) Shakhtar Donetsk	6	3	0	3	10	12	−2	9	Transfer to Europa League	1–0	1–3	—	1–0
4	(Belgium) Antwerp	6	1	0	5	6	17	−11	3		3–2	1–4	2–3	—

Source: UEFA
Rules for classification: Group stage tiebreakers
Notes:

19 September 2023 1	Barcelona (Spain)	5–0	(Belgium) Antwerp	Barcelona
21:00 CEST (UTC+2)	Félix 11', 66'; Lewandowski 19'; Bataille 22' (o.g.); Gavi (yellow card) 36', (goal) 54'	Report		Stadium: Estadi Olímpic Lluís Companys; Attendance: 40,989; Referee: Radu Petrescu (Romania)

4 October 2023 2	Antwerp (Belgium)	2–3	(Ukraine) Shakhtar Donetsk	Antwerp
18:45 CEST (UTC+2)	Muja 3'; Keita (yellow card) 12'; Balikwisha 33'; Janssen (yellow card) 37'; Alderweireld (yellow card) 88'	Report	Konoplya (yellow card) 36'; Sikan 48', 76', (yellow card) 82'; Rakitskyi (yellow card) 66', (goal) 71'	Stadium: Bosuilstadion; Attendance: 13,509; Referee: Rade Obrenovič (Slovenia)

25 October 2023 3	Antwerp (Belgium)	1–4	(Portugal) Porto	Antwerp
21:00 CEST (UTC+2)	Yusuf 37'; Muja (yellow card) 72'; Alderweireld (yellow card) 90'		Eustáquio (yellow card) 14', (goal) 54'; Carmo (yellow card) 45+2'; Evanilson 46', 69', 84'; Pepê (yellow card) 61'	Stadium: Bosuilstadion; Attendance: 13,651; Referee: Benoît Bastien (France)

7 November 2023 4	Porto (Portugal)	2–0	(Belgium) Antwerp	Porto
21:00 CET (UTC+1)	Evanilson 32' (pen.); Carmo (yellow card) 58'; Conceição (yellow card) 84'; Pepe 90+1'		Yusuf (yellow card) 20'; Vermeeren (yellow card) 45+2'; Ekkelenkamp (red card) 52'; Wijndal (yellow card) 62'	Stadium: Estádio do Dragão; Attendance: 44,830; Referee: Maurizio Mariani (Italy)

28 November 2023 5	Shakhtar Donetsk (Ukraine)	1–0	(Belgium) Antwerp	Hamburg (Germany)
18:45 CET (UTC+1)	Matviyenko 12'; Gocholeishvili (yellow card) 83'; Riznyk (yellow card) 90+7'	Report	Coulibaly (yellow card) 30'; Kerk (yellow card) 45+1'; Muja (yellow card) 90+4' (yellow-red card) 90+7'	Stadium: Volksparkstadion; Attendance: 47,209; Referee: Bartosz Frankowski (Poland)

13 December 2023 6	Antwerp (Belgium)	3–2	(Spain) Barcelona	Antwerp
21:00 CET (UTC+1)	Vermeeren 2'; Wijndal (yellow card) 23'; Janssen 56'; De Laet (yellow card) 90'; Ilenikhena 90+2'; Bataille (yellow card) 90+6'	Report	Torres 35', (yellow card) 90+6'; Yamal (yellow card) 42'; Roberto (yellow card) 54'; Guiu 90+1'	Stadium: Bosuilstadion; Attendance: 13,550; Referee: Marco Guida (Italy)

== Statistics ==
=== Goalscorers ===
As of 26 May 2024

Rank	No.	Pos	Nat	Name	Belgian Pro League	Belgian Cup	Champions League	Super Cup	Total
1	18	FW	(Netherlands)	Vincent Janssen	11	4	2	0	17
2	9	FW	(Nigeria)	George Ilenikhena	8	5	1	0	14
3	10	FW	(Belgium)	Michel-Ange Balikwisha	7	0	2	1	10
4	11	FW	(Kosovo)	Arbnor Muja	5	0	1	0	6
5	17	FW	(Sweden)	Jacob Ondrejka	5	0	0	0	5
5	19	FW	(Nigeria)	Chidera Ejuke	4	1	0	0	5
5	24	MF	(Netherlands)	Jurgen Ekkelenkamp	5	0	0	0	5
8	7	FW	(Suriname)	Gyrano Kerk	3	0	1	0	4
8	23	DF	(Belgium)	Toby Alderweireld	3	1	0	0	4
10	84	MF	(Mali)	Mahamadou Doumbia	2	1	0	0	3
11	33	DF	(Belgium)	Zeno Van den Bosch	0	2	0	0	2
11	48	MF	(Belgium)	Arthur Vermeeren	1	0	1	0	2
13	2	DF	(Belgium)	Ritchie De Laet	0	1	0	0	1
13	5	DF	(Netherlands)	Owen Wijndal	1	0	0	0	1
13	6	MF	(Belgium)	Eliot Matazo	1	0	0	0	1
13	8	MF	(Nigeria)	Alhassan Yusuf	0	0	1	0	1
13	21	DF	(United States)	Sam Vines	1	0	0	0	1
13	34	DF	(Belgium)	Jelle Bataille	1	0	0	0	1
13	52	DF	(Belgium)	Kobe Corbanie	1	0	0	0	1
Own goals					3	1	0	0	4
Totals					62	16	9	1	88
