= List of Belgian football transfers winter 2023–24 =

This is a list of Belgian football transfers in the winter transfer window 2023–24 by club. Only transfers of the Jupiler Pro League are included.

== Jupiler Pro League ==
Note: Flags indicate national team as has been defined under FIFA eligibility rules. Players may hold more than one non-FIFA nationality.

=== Genk ===
In:

| No. | Pos. | Nation | Player |
|---|---|---|---|
| 22 | DF | UKR | Eduard Sobol (on loan from (France) Strasbourg) |
| 27 | FW | BEL | Ken Nkuba (from Charleroi) |

Out:

| No. | Pos. | Nation | Player |
|---|---|---|---|
| 5 | DF | MEX | Gerardo Arteaga (to (Mexico) Monterrey) |
| 23 | DF | COL | Daniel Muñoz (to (England) Crystal Palace) |
| 28 | FW | GHA | Joseph Paintsil (to (United States) LA Galaxy) |

=== Union SG ===
In:

| No. | Pos. | Nation | Player |
|---|---|---|---|
| 12 | GK | AUT | Heinz Lindner (on loan from (Switzerland) Sion) |

Out:

| No. | Pos. | Nation | Player |
|---|---|---|---|
| 15 | DF | ENG | Matthew Sorinola (to (England) Plymouth Argyle) |

=== Antwerp ===
In:

| No. | Pos. | Nation | Player |
|---|---|---|---|
| 6 | MF | BEL | Eliot Matazo (on loan from (France) Monaco) |

Out:

| No. | Pos. | Nation | Player |
|---|---|---|---|
| 11 | FW | ALB | Arbnor Muja (to (Turkey) Samsunspor) |
| 21 | DF | USA | Sam Vines (to (United States) Colorado Rapids) |
| 26 | GK | BEL | Ortwin De Wolf (to Zulte Waregem) |
| 48 | MF | BEL | Arthur Vermeeren (to (Spain) Atlético Madrid) |
| — | FW | SUI | Michael Frey (to (England) Queens Park Rangers) |

=== Club Brugge ===
In:

| No. | Pos. | Nation | Player |

Out:

| No. | Pos. | Nation | Player |
|---|---|---|---|
| 17 | MF | CAN | Tajon Buchanan (to (Italy) Inter Milan) |
| 76 | FW | BEL | Romeo Vermant (on loan to Westerlo) |
| — | DF | FRA | Faitout Maouassa (on loan to (Spain) Granada, previously on loan at (France) Lens) |

=== Gent ===
In:

| No. | Pos. | Nation | Player |
|---|---|---|---|
| 9 | FW | SWE | Momodou Sonko (from (Sweden) Häcken) |
| 12 | DF | CTA | Hugo Gambor (from (France) Dunkerque) |
| 14 | MF | JPN | Daisuke Yokota (from (Poland) Górnik Zabrze) |
| 16 | GK | JPN | Daniel Schmidt (from Sint-Truiden) |
| 19 | FW | SUI | Franck Surdez (from (Switzerland) Neuchâtel Xamax) |
| 20 | DF | SRB | Stefan Mitrović (from (Spain) Getafe) |

Out:

| No. | Pos. | Nation | Player |
|---|---|---|---|
| 11 | FW | BEL | Hugo Cuypers (to (United States) Chicago Fire) |
| 15 | DF | BEL | Bram Lagae (on loan to (France) Dunkerque) |
| 19 | FW | BEL | Malick Fofana (to (France) Lyon) |
| 20 | FW | NGA | Gift Orban (to (France) Lyon) |
| — | MF | AUS | Keegan Jelacic (on loan to (Australia) Brisbane Roar, previously on loan at (Norway) Stabæk) |
| — | MF | GEO | Giorgi Chakvetadze (to (England) Watford, previously on loan) |

=== Standard Liège ===
In:

| No. | Pos. | Nation | Player |
|---|---|---|---|
| 5 | DF | ENG | Jonathan Panzo (on loan from (England) Nottingham Forest, previously on loan at (Wales) Cardiff City) |
| 9 | FW | ITA | Kelvin Yeboah (on loan from (Italy) Genoa, previously on loan at (France) Montpellier) |
| 11 | FW | ITA | Seydou Fini (on loan from (Italy) Genoa) |
| 15 | DF | CIV | Souleyman Doumbia (free agent) |

Out:

| No. | Pos. | Nation | Player |
|---|---|---|---|
| 9 | FW | BEL | Renaud Emond (to Eupen) |
| 10 | FW | NED | Noah Ohio (on loan to (England) Hull City) |
| 11 | MF | ENG | Isaac Hayden (loan return to (England) Newcastle United) |
| 21 | MF | ENG | Romaine Mundle (to (England) Sunderland) |

=== Westerlo ===
In:

| No. | Pos. | Nation | Player |
|---|---|---|---|
| 17 | FW | BEL | Romeo Vermant (on loan from Club Brugge) |
| 28 | MF | POL | Karol Borys (from (Poland) Śląsk Wrocław) |
| 90 | FW | IRN | Allahyar Sayyadmanesh (from (England) Hull City) |

Out:

| No. | Pos. | Nation | Player |
|---|---|---|---|
| 7 | MF | BEL | Lukas Van Eenoo (to Patro Eisden) |
| 13 | FW | SCO | Adedire Mebude (on loan to (England) Bristol City) |
| 16 | DF | SUI | Léo Seydoux (to (Netherlands) Dordrecht) |
| 21 | FW | MKD | Erdon Daci (on loan to Beveren) |
| 79 | MF | JPN | Yusuke Matsuo (loan return to (Japan) Urawa Red Diamonds) |

=== Cercle Brugge ===
In:

| No. | Pos. | Nation | Player |
|---|---|---|---|
| 7 | FW | FRA | Malamine Efekele (on loan from (France) Monaco) |
| 8 | MF | BRA | Erick Nunes (on loan from (Brazil) Fluminense) |
| 10 | FW | BRA | Felipe Augusto (from (Brazil) Corinthians) |

Out:

| No. | Pos. | Nation | Player |
|---|---|---|---|
| 10 | FW | FRA | Yann Gboho (to (France) Toulouse) |

=== Charleroi ===
In:

| No. | Pos. | Nation | Player |
|---|---|---|---|
| 5 | MF | FRA | Etienne Camara (from (Italy) Udinese) |
| 37 | DF | MAR | Achraf Dari (on loan from (France) Brest) |
| 98 | DF | FRA | Jeremy Petris (from (Bulgaria) Levski Sofia) |

Out:

| No. | Pos. | Nation | Player |
|---|---|---|---|
| 5 | DF | TOG | Loïc Bessilé (to (France) Dunkerque) |
| 28 | FW | BEL | Ken Nkuba (to Genk) |
| 88 | FW | BEL | Mitchy Ntelo (to (Bulgaria) Lokomotiv Plovdiv) |

=== OH Leuven ===
In:

| No. | Pos. | Nation | Player |
|---|---|---|---|
| 24 | DF | ARG | Franco Russo (on loan from (Bulgaria) Ludogorets Razgrad) |
| 25 | MF | BEL | Manuel Osifo (from Oostende) |
| 30 | MF | JPN | Takahiro Akimoto (on loan from (Japan) Urawa Red Diamonds) |

Out:

| No. | Pos. | Nation | Player |
|---|---|---|---|
| 3 | DF | ISR | Raz Shlomo (to (Israel) Maccabi Tel Aviv) |
| 10 | MF | AUT | Raphael Holzhauser (to (Luxembourg) Swift Hesperange) |
| — | DF | ARG | Santiago Ramos Mingo (to (Argentina) Defensa y Justicia, previously on loan) |

=== Anderlecht ===
In:

| No. | Pos. | Nation | Player |
|---|---|---|---|
| 16 | GK | DEN | Mads Kikkenborg (from (Denmark) Lyngby) |
| 33 | DF | ARG | Federico Gattoni (on loan from (Spain) Sevilla) |

Out:

| No. | Pos. | Nation | Player |
|---|---|---|---|
| 1 | GK | FRA | Maxime Dupé (to (France) Nice) |
| 8 | MF | FRA | Alexis Flips (on loan to (Turkey) Ankaragücü) |
| 9 | FW | BEL | Benito Raman (to (Turkey) Samsunspor) |
| 19 | MF | NED | Justin Lonwijk (loan return to (Ukraine) Dynamo Kyiv) |

=== Sint-Truiden ===
In:

| No. | Pos. | Nation | Player |
|---|---|---|---|
| 1 | GK | JPN | Zion Suzuki (from (Japan) Urawa Red Diamonds, previously on loan) |
| 91 | FW | BEL | Adriano Bertaccini (from RFC Liège) |

Out:

| No. | Pos. | Nation | Player |
|---|---|---|---|
| 4 | DF | JPN | Daiki Hashioka (to (England) Luton Town) |
| 21 | GK | JPN | Daniel Schmidt (to Gent) |

=== Mechelen ===
In:

| No. | Pos. | Nation | Player |
|---|---|---|---|
| 3 | DF | ZIM | Munashe Garananga (from (Moldova) Sheriff Tiraspol) |
| 9 | FW | ALG | Islam Slimani (from (Brazil) Coritiba) |

Out:

| No. | Pos. | Nation | Player |
|---|---|---|---|
| 10 | FW | ISR | Yonas Malede (to (Israel) Maccabi Tel Aviv) |
| 28 | FW | BEL | Frederic Soelle Soelle (from RWDM) |
| 30 | DF | BEL | Jordi Vanlerberghe (to (Denmark) Brøndby) |

=== Kortrijk ===
In:

| No. | Pos. | Nation | Player |
|---|---|---|---|
| 9 | FW | IRL | Jonathan Afolabi (from (Republic of Ireland) Bohemians) |
| 14 | MF | NOR | Iver Fossum (from (Denmark) Midtjylland) |
| 17 | MF | ZAM | Kings Kangwa (on loan from (Serbia) Red Star Belgrade) |
| 24 | DF | JPN | Haruya Fujii (on loan from (Japan) Nagoya Grampus) |
| 33 | DF | JPN | Ryotaro Tsunoda (on loan from (Wales) Cardiff City) |

Out:

| No. | Pos. | Nation | Player |
|---|---|---|---|
| 7 | MF | BEL | Dylan Mbayo (on loan to (Netherlands) Dordrecht) |
| 23 | FW | ENG | Alex Mighten (loan return to (England) Nottingham Forest) |
| 29 | FW | SVK | Martin Regáli (to (Czech Republic) Karviná) |
| 66 | DF | SRB | Aleksandar Radovanović (to (Spain) Almería) |
| 77 | FW | TOG | David Henen (to (Kazakhstan) Tobol) |
| 98 | DF | ROU | Raul Opruț (on loan to (Romania) Hermannstadt) |
| — | FW | MAS | Luqman Hakim (on loan to (Japan) YSCC Yokohama, previously on loan at (Iceland) Njarðvík) |

=== Eupen ===
In:

| No. | Pos. | Nation | Player |
|---|---|---|---|
| 9 | FW | BEL | Renaud Emond (from Standard Liège) |
| 20 | DF | IDN | Shayne Pattynama (from (Norway) Viking) |

Out:

| No. | Pos. | Nation | Player |
|---|---|---|---|
| 30 | DF | SVN | Jan Gorenc (on loan to (Slovenia) Bravo) |

=== RWDM ===
In:

| No. | Pos. | Nation | Player |
|---|---|---|---|
| 10 | FW | ENG | Malcolm Ebiowei (on loan from (England) Crystal Palace) |
| 11 | DF | IRL | Tayo Adaramola (on loan from (England) Crystal Palace) |
| 22 | FW | BEL | Frederic Soelle Soelle (from Mechelen) |
| 29 | DF | FRA | Mamadou Sarr (on loan from (France) Lyon) |
| 34 | DF | CGO | Christ Makosso (from (France) Sochaux) |
| 43 | DF | BRA | David Sousa (from (Brazil) Botafogo) |
| 80 | FW | PAR | Matías Segovia (reloan from (Brazil) Botafogo) |
| 89 | FW | BRA | Carlos Alberto (on loan from (Brazil) Botafogo) |
| 94 | DF | BRA | Philipe Sampaio (on loan from (Brazil) Botafogo) |

Out:

| No. | Pos. | Nation | Player |
|---|---|---|---|
| 2 | DF | ECU | Luis Segovia (loan return to (Brazil) Botafogo) |
| 3 | DF | FRA | Florian Le Joncour (to SV Elversberg) |
| 11 | FW | BEL | Niklo Dailly (on loan to Francs Borains) |
| 14 | FW | BEL | Kylian Hazard (on loan to Beveren) |
| 20 | MF | BEL | Théo Gécé (on loan to Francs Borains) |
| 31 | FW | BOL | Sebastian Joffre (to (United States) Real Salt Lake) |
| 62 | MF | BRA | Kayque (loan return to (Brazil) Botafogo) |
| — | FW | BRA | Ênio (to (Brazil) Amazonas) |

== See also ==
- 2023–24 Belgian Pro League
