= 2023–24 Cercle Brugge KSV season =

Cercle Brugge K.S.V.
2023–24 season
- Manager: Miron Muslic
- Stadium: Jan Breydel Stadium
- Belgian Pro League: 5th
- Champions' play-offs: 4th
- Belgian Cup: Seventh round
- Top goalscorer: League: Kévin Denkey (25); All: Kévin Denkey (26)
- Average home league attendance: 5,404
- Biggest defeat: Cercle Brugge 0–3 Anderlecht

The 2023–24 season was Cercle Brugge K.S.V.'s 125th season in existence and sixth consecutive in the Belgian Pro League. They also competed in the Belgian Cup.

== Players ==
=== First-team squad ===
As of 24 January 2024

Note: Flags indicate national team as defined under FIFA eligibility rules; some limited exceptions apply. Players may hold more than one non-FIFA nationality.

No.	Pos.	Nation	Player
1	GK	BRA	Warleson
3	MF	LTU	Edgaras Utkus
4	DF	NOR	Jesper Daland
5	DF	SRB	Boris Popović
6	FW	FRA	Félix Lemaréchal (on loan from Monaco)
7	FW	FRA	Malamine Efekele (on loan from Monaco)
8	MF	BRA	Erick (on loan from Fluminense)
9	FW	TOG	Kévin Denkey
10	FW	BRA	Felipe Augusto
11	MF	ECU	Alan Minda
17	MF	GHA	Abu Francis
18	DF	BEL	Senna Miangué
19	FW	BEL	Kazeem Olaigbe
20	DF	POR	Flávio Nazinho (on loan from Sporting)

No.	Pos.	Nation	Player
21	GK	BEL	Maxime Delanghe
22	MF	POR	Leonardo Lopes
27	MF	BEL	Nils De Wilde
28	MF	BEL	Hannes Van der Bruggen
29	DF	FRA	Louis Torres
32	FW	FRA	Romaric Etonde (on loan from Monaco)
34	FW	BEL	Thibo Somers
41	DF	BEL	Hugo Siquet (on loan from Freiburg)
66	DF	BEL	Christiaan Ravych
76	DF	BEL	Jonas Lietaert
77	DF	FRA	Jordan Semedo (on loan from Monaco)
84	GK	BEL	Bas Langenbick
89	GK	BEL	Sébastien Bruzzese
99	FW	BFA	Abdoul Ouattara

=== Other players under contract ===
Note: Flags indicate national team as defined under FIFA eligibility rules; some limited exceptions apply. Players may hold more than one non-FIFA nationality.

No.	Pos.	Nation	Player
—	GK	FRA	Thomas Didillon

=== Out on loan ===
Note: Flags indicate national team as defined under FIFA eligibility rules; some limited exceptions apply. Players may hold more than one non-FIFA nationality.

No.	Pos.	Nation	Player
—	FW	GER	Emilio Kehrer (at Deinze until 30 June 2024)

== Transfers ==
=== In ===
Pos.	Player	Transferred from	Fee	Date	Source
MF	(Belgium) Nils De Wilde	(Belgium) RSCA Futures	Free	1 July 2023	
MF	(Ecuador) Alan Minda	(Ecuador) Independiente del Valle	€2,000,000	12 July 2023	
MF	(France) Félix Lemaréchal	Monaco	Loan	1 September 2023	
DF	(Portugal) Nazinho	(Portugal) Sporting CP	Loan	6 September 2023	
MF	(Belgium) Noah De Ridder	(Belgium) Gent	Loan	6 January 2024	
FW	(Brazil) Felipe Augusto	(Brazil) Corinthians	€3,000,000	6 January 2024	
FW	(France) Malamine Efekele	Monaco	Loan	24 January 2024	

=== Out ===
Pos.	Player	Transferred to	Fee	Date	Source
MF	(Bosnia and Herzegovina) Dino Hotić	(Poland) Lech Poznań	Free	12 July 2023	
FW	(Japan) Ayase Ueda	(Netherlands) Feyenoord	€9,000,000	3 August 2023	
MF	(Belgium) Olivier Deman	(Germany) Werder Bremen	€4,000,000	31 August 2023	

== Pre-season and friendlies ==
7 July 2023 Friendly	Servette (Switzerland)	2–0	(Belgium) Cercle Brugge
18:00

14 July 2023 Friendly	Cercle Brugge (Belgium)	0–0	(Belgium) Dender
13:00

15 July 2023 Friendly	Cercle Brugge (Belgium)	3–0	(France) Monaco
17:00

22 July 2023 Friendly	Lille (France)	7–2	(Belgium) Cercle Brugge
11:00

13 October 2023 Friendly	Cercle Brugge (Belgium)	3–1	(Belgium) Deinze
13:00

16 November 2023 Friendly	RKC Waalwijk (Netherlands)	3–5	(Belgium) Cercle Brugge
13:00

== Competitions ==
=== Overall record ===
Competition	First match	Last match	Starting round	Final position	Record							
Competition	First match	Last match	Starting round	Final position	Pld	W	D	L	GF	GA	GD	Win %
Belgian Pro League Regular season	30 July 2023	17 March 2024	Matchday 1	5th	30	14	5	11	44	34	+10	46.67
Champions' Play-offs	1 April 2024	26 May 2024	5th		9	3	3	3	13	13	+0	33.33
Belgian Cup	31 October 2023		Seventh round	Seventh round	1	0	1	0	2	2	+0	0.00
Total					40	17	9	14	59	49	+10	42.50

Last updated: 19 May 2024
Source: Soccerway

=== Belgian Pro League ===
==== Regular season ====
Pos	Team	Pld	W	D	L	GF	GA	GD	Pts	Qualification or relegation
3	Antwerp	30	14	10	6	55	27	+28	52	Qualification for the champions' play-offs
4	Club Brugge	30	14	9	7	62	29	+33	51	Qualification for the champions' play-offs
5	Cercle Brugge	30	14	5	11	44	34	+10	47	Qualification for the champions' play-offs
6	Genk	30	12	11	7	51	31	+20	47	Qualification for the champions' play-offs
7	Gent	30	12	11	7	53	38	+15	47	Qualification for the Europe play-offs

Source: Jupiler Pro League (in Dutch), Soccerway
Rules for classification: 1) Points; 2) Matches won; 3) Goal difference; 4) Goals scored; 5) Away matches won; 6) Away goal difference; 7) Away goals scored; 8) Play-off.

==== Results summary ====
Overall								Home						Away					
Pld	W	D	L	GF	GA	GD	Pts	W	D	L	GF	GA	GD	W	D	L	GF	GA	GD
30	14	5	11	44	34	+10	47	8	2	5	27	18	+9	6	3	6	17	16	+1

Source: Worldfootball

==== Results by round ====
Round	1	2	3	4	5	6	7	8	9	10	11	12	13	14	15	16	17	18	19	20	21	22	23	24	25	26	27	28	29	30
Ground	A	H	H	A	H	H	A	H	A	H	H	A	H	A	H	A	H	A	H	A	A	H	A	H	A	H	A	H	A	H
Result	L	W	L	W	W	W	L	L	L	W	W	W	L	D	W	L	L	W	W	L	D	D	L	W	W	D	W	L	D	W
Position	13	6	10	9	6	4	6	8	8	6	4	4	4	6	4	6	7	7	6	7	7	7	7	6	5	6	5	5	7	5

Source: Worldfootball
A = Away; H = Home; W = Win; D = Draw; L = Loss

==== Matches ====
The league fixtures were unveiled on 22 June 2023.

30 July 2023 1	Antwerp	1–0	Cercle Brugge	Antwerp
13:30 CEST (UTC+2)	Daland 45+1' (o.g.)	Report	Ravych (yellow card) 58'; Francis (yellow card) 72'	Stadium: Bosuilstadion; Attendance: 12,277; Referee: Jonathan Lardot

5 August 2023 2	Cercle Brugge	2–0	Charleroi	Bruges
18:15				Stadium: Jan Breydel Stadium

13 August 2023 3	Cercle Brugge	0–1	Genk	Bruges
16:00				Stadium: Jan Breydel Stadium

19 August 2023 4	Standard Liège	0–1	Cercle Brugge	Liège
16:00				Stadium: Stade Maurice Dufrasne

27 August 2023 5	STVV	0–2	Cercle Brugge	Sint-Truiden
16:00				Stadium: Stayen

2 September 2023 6	Cercle Brugge	2–1	Westerlo	Bruges
16:00				Stadium: Jan Breydel Stadium

16 September 2023 7	RWDM	2–1	Cercle Brugge	Brussels
16:00				Stadium: Edmond Machtens Stadium

24 September 2023 8	Cercle Brugge	0–2	Union Saint-Gilloise	Bruges
16:00				Stadium: Jan Breydel Stadium

29 September 2023 9	Kortrijk	2–1	Cercle Brugge	Kortrijk
20:45				Stadium: Guldensporen Stadion

7 October 2023 10	Cercle Brugge	3–2	OH Leuven	Bruges
16:00				Stadium: Jan Breydel Stadium

22 October 2023 11	Cercle Brugge	2–0	Gent	Bruges
16:00				Stadium: Jan Breydel Stadium

28 October 2023 12	Mechelen	0–2	Cercle Brugge	Mechelen
16:00				Stadium: Achter de Kazerne

5 November 2023 13	Cercle Brugge	0–3	Anderlecht	Bruges
13:30				Stadium: Jan Breydel Stadium

12 November 2023 14	Club Brugge	0–0	Cercle Brugge	Brugge
13:30				Stadium: Jan Breydel Stadium

25 November 2023 15	Cercle Brugge	2–0	Eupen	Bruges
16:00				Stadium: Jan Breydel Stadium

25 November 2023 16	Union Saint-Gilloise	2–1	Cercle Brugge	Forest
19:15 CET				Stadium: Joseph Marien Stadium

==== Results summary ====
Overall								Home						Away					
Pld	W	D	L	GF	GA	GD	Pts	W	D	L	GF	GA	GD	W	D	L	GF	GA	GD
9	3	3	3	13	13	0	12	1	2	2	7	6	+1	2	1	1	6	7	−1

Last updated: 19 May 2024.
Source: Worldfootball

==== Results by round ====
Round	1	2	3	4	5	6	7	8	9	10
Ground	H	A	A	H	A	H	H	A	H	A
Result	D	W	D	L	L	D	W	W	L	
Position	6	5	5	6	6	5	5	4	5	

Updated to match(es) played on 19 May 2024. Source: Worldfootball
A = Away; H = Home; W = Win; D = Draw; L = Loss

==== Matches ====
1 April 2024 1	Cercle Brugge	1–1	Club Brugge	Bruges
13:30 CEST (UTC+2)	Denkey 32'	Report	Skov Olsen 83'	Stadium: Jan Breydel Stadium; Attendance: 8,762; Referee: Erik Lambrechts

26 May 2024 10	Club Brugge	v	Cercle Brugge	Bruges
18:30 CEST (UTC+2)		Report		Stadium: Jan Breydel Stadium

=== Belgian Cup ===
31 October 2023 Seventh round	Cercle Brugge	2–2 (a.e.t.) (3–4 p)	Zulte Waregem	Bruges
20:30				Stadium: Jan Breydel Stadium
