= 2025–26 Trabzonspor season =

Trabzonspor
2025–26 season
- President: Ertuğrul Doğan
- Head coach: Fatih Tekke
- Stadium: Şenol Güneş Sports Complex
- Süper Lig: 3rd
- Turkish Cup: Winners
- Turkish Super Cup: Semi-finals
- Top goalscorer: League: Paul Onuachu (22); All: Paul Onuachu (26)
- Average home league attendance: 27,335
Home colours	Away colours	Third colours

The 2025–26 season was the 59th season in the history of Trabzonspor, and the club's 52nd consecutive season in the Süper Lig. In addition to the domestic league, the club participated in the Turkish Cup, and the Turkish Super Cup.

On 22 May 2026, the club defeated Konyaspor 2–1 in the Turkish Cup final to lift the trophy for the 10th time.

Paul Onuachu finished the seasons as the league's joint top scorer with 22 goals alongside İstanbul Başakşehir forward Eldor Shomurodov.

== Competitions ==
=== Süper Lig ===
==== League table ====
Pos	Team	Pld	W	D	L	GF	GA	GD	Pts	Qualification or relegation
1	Galatasaray (C)	34	24	5	5	77	30	+47	77	Qualification for the Champions League league phase
2	Fenerbahçe	34	21	11	2	77	37	+40	74	Qualification for the Champions League second qualifying round
3	Trabzonspor	34	20	9	5	61	39	+22	69	Qualification for the Europa League play-off round (Note: The 2025–26 Turkish Cup winners qualified for the Europa League play-off round. Since the cup winners (Trabzonspor) qualified based on league position, the Europa League play-off round spot was passed to the third-placed team, the Europa League second round spot was passed to the fourth-placed team, and the Conference League spot was passed to the fifth-placed team.)
4	Beşiktaş	34	17	9	8	59	40	+19	60	Qualification for the Europa League second qualifying round
5	Başakşehir	34	16	9	9	58	35	+23	57	Qualification for the Conference League second qualifying round

Source: Süper Lig
Rules for classification: 1) Points; 2) Head-to-head points; 3) Head-to-head goal difference; 4) Head-to-head goals scored; 5) Goal difference; 6) Goals scored; 7) Play-off.
(Note: Head-to-head record is used only after all the matches between the teams in question have been played)
(C) Champions

==== Results summary ====
Overall								Home						Away					
Pld	W	D	L	GF	GA	GD	Pts	W	D	L	GF	GA	GD	W	D	L	GF	GA	GD
34	20	9	5	61	39	+22	69	9	6	2	29	17	+12	11	3	3	32	22	+10

Last updated: 17 May 2026.
Source: Süper Lig

==== Results by round ====
Round	1	2	3	4	5	6	7	8	9	10	11	12	13	14	15	16	17	18	19	20	21	22	23	24	25	26	27	28	29	30	31	32	33	34
Ground	H	A	H	H	A	H	A	H	A	H	A	H	A	H	A	H	A	A	H	A	A	H	A	H	A	H	A	H	A	H	A	H	A	H
Result	W	W	W	D	L	D	W	W	W	W	D	D	W	W	W	D	L	W	W	D	W	L	W	W	W	W	W	W	D	D	L	D	W	L
Position	8	6	3	2	4	6	4	2	2	2	3	3	3	3	2	3	3	3	3	3	3	3	3	3	3	3	3	3	3	3	3	3	3	3

Updated to match(es) played on 17 May 2026. Source: TFF.org
W = Win; D = Draw; L = Loss

=== Turkish Cup ===
==== Group stage ====
The draw for the group stage was held on 5 December 2025.

Pos	Team	Pld	W	D	L	GF	GA	GD	Pts	Qualification
1	Galatasaray	4	4	0	0	8	3	+5	12	Quarter-finals
2	Trabzonspor	4	3	0	1	13	4	+9	9	Quarter-finals
3	Alanyaspor	4	2	1	1	8	4	+4	7	Quarter-finals
4	Başakşehir	4	2	0	2	8	7	+1	6	
5	Fatih Karagümrük	4	1	2	1	5	6	−1	5	
6	Boluspor	4	0	2	2	1	6	−5	2	
7	İstanbulspor	4	0	2	2	2	9	−7	2	
8	Fethiyespor	4	0	1	3	1	7	−6	1	

Source: TFF.org

17 December 2025 1	Trabzonspor	0–1	Alanyaspor	Trabzon
20:30		Report	Yalçın 17'	Stadium: Papara Park

14 January 2026 2	İstanbulspor	1–6	Trabzonspor	Istanbul
18:00	Krstovski 29'	Report	Muçi 41', 60'; Batagov 57'; Olaigbe 70'; Sikan 85', 90+1'	Stadium: Esenyurt Necmi Kadıoğlu Stadium

3 February 2026 3	Trabzonspor	3–0	Fethiyespor	Trabzon
20:30	Muçi 69'; Onuachu 77'; Nwakaeme 79'	Report		Stadium: Papara Park

3 March 2026 4	Başakşehir	2–4	Trabzonspor	Istanbul
20:30	Costa 46'; Brnić 66'	Report	Augusto 6'; Eskihellaç 70'; Onuachu 84'; Tufan 85'	Stadium: Başakşehir Fatih Terim Stadium

==== Quarter-finals ====
The draw for the quarter-finals and semi-finals was held on 11 March 2026.

23 April 2026 Quarter-finals	Samsunspor	0–0 (a.e.t.) (1–3 p)	Trabzonspor	Samsun
18:45		Report		Stadium: Samsun 19 Mayıs Stadium
	Penalties
	Satka (penalty missed); Mouandilmadji (penalty missed); Çift (penalty missed); Tomasson (penalty scored)		(penalty scored) Onuachu; (penalty missed) Eskihellaç; (penalty missed) Bouchouari; (penalty scored) Nwakaeme; (penalty scored) Muçi

==== Semi-finals ====
13 May 2026 Semi-finals	Gençlerbirliği	1–2	Trabzonspor	Ankara
20:30	Aslan 62'	Report	Çelik 78' (o.g.); Muçi 90+2'	Stadium: Eryaman Stadium

==== Final ====
On 29 April 2026, the TFF announced that the final would take place at Antalya Stadium in Antalya, Turkey.

22 May 2026 Final	Trabzonspor	2–1	Konyaspor	Antalya Stadium, Antalya
20:45 TRT	Onuachu 18', 79' (pen.)	Report	Muleka 50'	Referee: Halil Umut Meler

=== Turkish Super Cup ===
5 January 2026 Semi-final	Galatasaray	4–1	Trabzonspor	Gaziantep
20:30 UTC+3	Yılmaz 38'; Elmalı 45+3'; Akgün 63'; Icardi 81'	Report	Felipe Augusto 55'	Stadium: Gaziantep Stadium; Referee: Cihan Aydın
