= Flávio Nazinho =

Portuguese footballer (born 2003)

Personal information
- Full name: Flávio Basilua Jacinto Nazinho
- Date of birth: 20 July 2003 (age 23)
- Place of birth: Almada, Portugal
- Height: 1.78 m (5 ft 10 in)
- Position: Left-back

Team information
- Current team: Monaco
- Number: 20

Youth career
- 2011–2012: Monte Caparica
- 2012–2013: Leão Altivo
- 2013–2015: Cova da Piedade
- 2015–2017: Pescadores
- 2017–2018: Braga
- 2018–2021: Sporting CP

Senior career*
Years	Team	Apps	(Gls)
2020–2024	Sporting CP B	29	(3)
2021–2024	Sporting CP	5	(0)
2023–2024	→ Cercle Brugge (loan)	22	(1)
2024–2026	Cercle Brugge	57	(4)
2026–	Monaco	10	(1)

International career^{‡}
2019	Portugal U16	2	(0)
2021	Portugal U18	2	(0)
2021–2022	Portugal U19	5	(0)
2022–2023	Portugal U20	6	(0)
2024–2025	Portugal U21	8	(0)
- * Club domestic league appearances and goals as of 8 November 2026 ‡ National team caps and goals as of 21 June 2025

Flávio Basilua Jacinto Nazinho (Portuguese pronunciation: [ˈflaviu nɐˈziɲu]; born 20 July 2003) is a Portuguese professional footballer who plays as a left-back for Ligue 1 club Monaco.

== Club career ==
=== Early career ===
Born in Almada, Setúbal District, and of Bissau-Guinean descent, Nazinho began his youth career at Sporting CP's youth system. He would be forced to leave their academy, due to his father being unable to take him to training. Due to the fatigue shown by him, his father preferred to put his son to play in clubs in the region where they lived, leading him to be integrated into Monte Caparica, Leão Altivo, Cova da Piedade and Pescadores's youth academies. At the age of 14, Nazinho sparked the interest of several scouts, caught the attention of Braga, whom he signed a contract with, before returning to Sporting CP's academy in 2018, after impressing in an exhibition match against them.

=== Sporting CP ===
Nazinho joined Sporting's B-team in 2020 and signed a professional contract with the club on 1 March 2021. During this time, he initially played as a left-winger, before being converted to a left-back. After impressing in his new position, he was called up to the first team by manager Ruben Amorim, and occasionally played in the club's under 23s and B teams.

He made his professional debut for Sporting in a 3–1 UEFA Champions League group stage victory against Borussia Dortmund on 24 November 2021, replacing Pedro Gonçalves in the 88th minute, in a match, where his team ensured qualification to the round of sixteen for the first time since the 2008–09 season. He would make his league debut for the club, as a starter on 11 December in a 2–0 home win over Boavista.

=== Cercle Brugge ===
On 6 September 2023, Sporting CP sent Nazinho on a season-long loan to Belgian Pro League side Cercle Brugge. The deal reportedly included a €2 million option-to-buy. On 27 June 2024, it was announced that Nazinho had joined Cercle Brugge on a permanent deal, signing a contract until 30 June 2028.

=== Monaco ===
On 30 June 2026, Nazinho signed a four-year contract with Monaco in Ligue 1. He made his debut for the team in the Five Violins Trophy match against Sporting CP, starting the game.

== International career ==
Nazinho represented Portugal at under-16, under-18, under-19 levels, for a total of 6 caps.

He was one of the players who were called-up with the Portugal national team by head coach Jorge Jesus for the 2026–27 UEFA Nations League matches against Denmark and Wales on 14 and 17 November 2026, respectively.

== Career statistics ==
=== Club ===
As of match played 8 November 2026

Appearances and goals by club, season and competition
Club	Season	League			National cup (Note: Includes Taça de Portugal, Belgian Cup)		League cup		Europe		Other		Total	
Club	Season	Division	Apps	Goals	Apps	Goals	Apps	Goals	Apps	Goals	Apps	Goals	Apps	Goals
Sporting CP B	2020–21	Campeonato de Portugal	5	0	—		—		—		—		5	0
Sporting CP B	2021–22	Liga 3	12	1	—		—		—		—		12	1
Sporting CP B	2022–23	Liga 3	12	2	—		—		—		—		12	2
Sporting CP B	Total		29	3	—		—		—		—		29	3
Sporting CP	2021–22	Primeira Liga	2	0	1	0	0	0	2 (Note: Appearances in UEFA Champions League)	0	0	0	5	0
Sporting CP	2022–23	Primeira Liga	3	0	0	0	0	0	3	0	—		6	0
Sporting CP	Total		5	0	1	0	0	0	5	0	0	0	11	0
Cercle Brugge (loan)	2023–24	Belgian Pro League	22	1	1	0	—		—		—		23	1
Cercle Brugge	2024–25	Belgian Pro League	29	2	0	0	—		6 (Note: Four appearances in UEFA Europa League, two appearances in UEFA Conference League)	0	—		35	2
Cercle Brugge	2025–26	Belgian Pro League	30	3	2	0	—		—		—		32	3
Cercle Brugge	Total		59	5	2	0	—		6	0	—		67	5
Monaco	2026–27	Ligue 1	10	1	0	0	—		4 (Note: Appearances in UEFA Conference League)	0	—		14	1
Career total			125	10	4	0	0	0	15	0	0	0	144	10
