= Miron Muslić =

Football manager (born 1982)

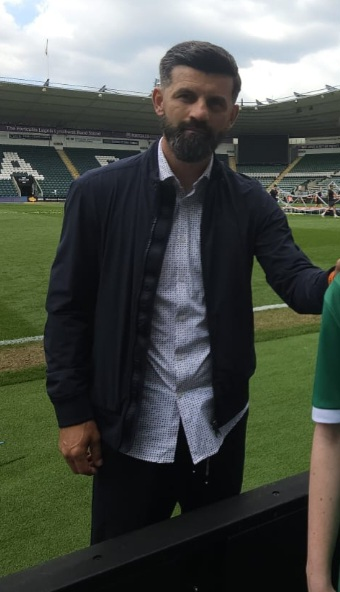
- Muslić in 2025

Personal information
- Date of birth: 14 September 1982 (age 44)
- Place of birth: Bihać, SR Bosnia and Herzegovina, SFR Yugoslavia
- Height: 1.84 m (6 ft 0 in)
- Position: Forward

Team information
- Current team: Schalke 04 (manager)

Youth career
- 1994–1999: Wacker Innsbruck

Senior career*
Years	Team	Apps	(Gls)
1999–2000	Wacker Innsbruck		
2000–2002	SV Wörgl	10	(0)
2002–2003	NK Novalja		
2003–2005	SV Wörgl	47	(10)
2005–2006	SVG Reichenau	18	(5)
2006–2007	SV Hall	29	(21)
2007–2008	SV Ried	82	(9)
2008–2010	SV Gmunden	66	(33)
2010–2012	ATSV Sattledt	46	(23)
2012–2015	Union Weißkirchen	65	(64)
2015–2017	SV Ried II		

Managerial career
- 2018: SV Ried (caretaker)
- 2020: Floridsdorfer AC
- 2021: SV Ried
- 2022–2024: Cercle Brugge
- 2025: Plymouth Argyle
- 2025–: Schalke 04
- * Club domestic league appearances and goals

Miron Muslić (born 14 September 1982) is an Austrian and Bosnian professional football manager and former player who is the current manager of Bundesliga club Schalke 04.

== Club career ==
Muslić came to Austria with his family during the turmoil of the Bosnian war and started playing football in the academy of Wacker Innsbruck in 1994 at the age of twelve. After the club disbanded, he played for Tirol Innsbruck from 1999. In October 2000, he moved to the second division club Wörgl. He made his debut for Wörgl in the second division in March 2001, when he was substituted for Markus Unterrainer at half-time on matchday 24 of the 2000–01 season against First Vienna.

Muslić moved to Novalja in Croatia for the 2002–03 season. After a season abroad, he returned to Wörgl in 2003. In September 2003, he scored his first second league goal in a 2–2 draw against BSV Juniors. With Wörgl, he was relegated from the second-highest division in the 2004–05 season.

He then moved to third division club SVG Reichenau for the 2005–06 season, for whom he played 18 games. In the summer of 2006, he joined league rivals Hall. In the 2006–07 season, he scored 21 goals in 29 games for Hall in the Regionalliga West. He moved to Bundesliga club SV Ried for the 2007–08 season. He made his Bundesliga debut in July 2007, coming on as an 83rd-minute substitute for Jovan Damjanović on matchday three of that season against Austria Kärnten.

After four games in the Bundesliga, Muslić moved to third division club Gmunden during the winter break of the 2007–08 season. With Gmunden, he was relegated to the OÖ Liga at the end of the season. He joined league rivals ATSV Sattledt for the 2010–11 season. With Sattledt, he was relegated from the fourth-highest division in 2012. He then joined fifth-tier Union Weißkirchen in the summer of 2012, with whom he was promoted to the OÖ Liga in 2014. After finishing second in the scoring charts in the 2012–13 season with 24 goals in 26 games, he became the top scorer in the fifth-tier Landesliga Ost in the 2013–14 season, with 31 goals in 24 appearances.

He returned to Ried for the 2015–16 season, where he joined the amateur team. He ended his active career after the 2016–17 season.

== Managerial career ==
=== Early career ===
Muslić was assistant coach to Alfred Olzinger at Union Weißkirchen in 2014. From the 2015–16 season, he was also assistant coach to Thomas Weissenböck at Ried's amateur team.

From the 2017–18 season, he coached the Ried Under-18s team. In April 2018, he became Weissenböck's assistant coach with the first team at SV Ried. He also took over as head coach of Ried's amateurs for the 2018–19 season.

Following Weissenböck's resignation in November 2018, Muslić took over Ried as head coach on an interim basis for one match. In December 2018, he gave up his role as coach of the amateurs to work only as an assistant coach. After the 2018–19 season, he returned to the academy.

On 14 July 2020, Muslić was hired as a manager by Austrian Football Second League club Floridsdorfer AC.

Muslić returned to Austrian Bundesliga club SV Ried in January 2021 and became head coach of the club. After ten games as coach of Ried, he resigned in March 2021, with the Upper Austrians picking up just three points in this period and remaining winless.

=== Cercle Brugge ===
In October 2021, Muslić became assistant coach to Yves Vanderhaeghe at Cercle Brugge. He also remained at the club under Dominik Thalhammer, and was promoted to the main first-team managerial role the following year, replacing Thalhammer on 19 September 2022. Helped by the goals of Japan international Ayase Ueda, Muslić steered Cercle from the relegation zone to a regular-season finishing position of eighth for the 2022–23 campaign, qualifying them for a streamlined version of the Belgian Pro League's European play-offs. They finished runners-up to Gent in these play-offs for the final European qualifying place, seeing them officially finish in sixth position.

With Ueda moving to Feyenoord, and Kevin Denkey promoted to become Muslić's first-choice striker, Cercle would qualify for the title play-offs for the first time, going on to finish fourth for the 2023–24 season, their highest finish since 2008, qualifying them for Europe for the first time in 14 years, and only the fourth time ever.

Early season struggles for the 2024–25 season did not clear, and after a 2–0 lead over bottom side Beerschot turned into a 2–3 defeat, Muslić was dismissed as Cercle manager on 2 December 2024.

=== Plymouth Argyle ===
On 10 January 2025, Muslić signed a three-and-a-half-year contract to become head coach of EFL Championship side Plymouth Argyle.

On 9 February 2025, with Plymouth in the bottom position in the Championship, Muslić's team met Liverpool at Home Park in the FA Cup Fourth Round and won 1–0. The win marked only the fourth time in FA Cup history that the leaders of the Premier League have been knocked out by a team outside the top flight.

On 28 May 2025, the club announced they had "reluctantly" given Muslić permission to speak to a team in the German second division, reportedly Schalke 04, about becoming their manager. Plymouth expressed frustration in their official statement announcing the decision, noting that they had "received repeated verbal promises from Miron that he was committed to Argyle."

=== Schalke 04 ===
On 31 May 2025, Muslić joined Schalke 04 on a two-year deal. In his first match in charge, he led Schalke to a 2–1 home win over Hertha BSC on 1 August 2025. On 2 May 2026, he led the club to secure promotion to the Bundesliga by finishing top of the 2025–26 season with a 1–0 victory over Fortuna Düsseldorf, triggering an automatic contract extension until 2028.

== Personal life ==
Born in SFR Yugoslavia, in what is now Bosnia and Herzegovina, Muslić and his family fled to Innsbruck as refugees in 1992, when he was nine years old after his hometown came under siege. Speaking to BBC Sport, Muslić described how, "[his family] had to leave Bosnia, and Bihać, our hometown, literally overnight, grabbing things you can grab with your hands."

He has three children with his wife, Ensada.

== Managerial statistics ==
As of match played 21 November 2026

Team	From	To	Record				
Team	From	To	P	W	D	L	W%
SV Ried (caretaker)	12 November 2018	25 November 2018	1	1	0	0	100.00
Floridsdorfer AC	1 August 2020	31 December 2020	16	7	2	7	43.75
SV Ried	1 January 2021	25 March 2021	10	0	3	7	0.00
Cercle Brugge	19 September 2022	2 December 2024	101	43	24	34	42.57
Plymouth Argyle	10 January 2025	28 May 2025	23	8	5	10	34.78
Schalke 04	31 May 2025	present	48	24	11	13	50.00
Total			199	83	45	71	41.71

== Honours ==
=== Manager ===
Schalke 04

- 2. Bundesliga: 2025–26
