= Alan Minda =

Ecuadorian footballer (born 2003)

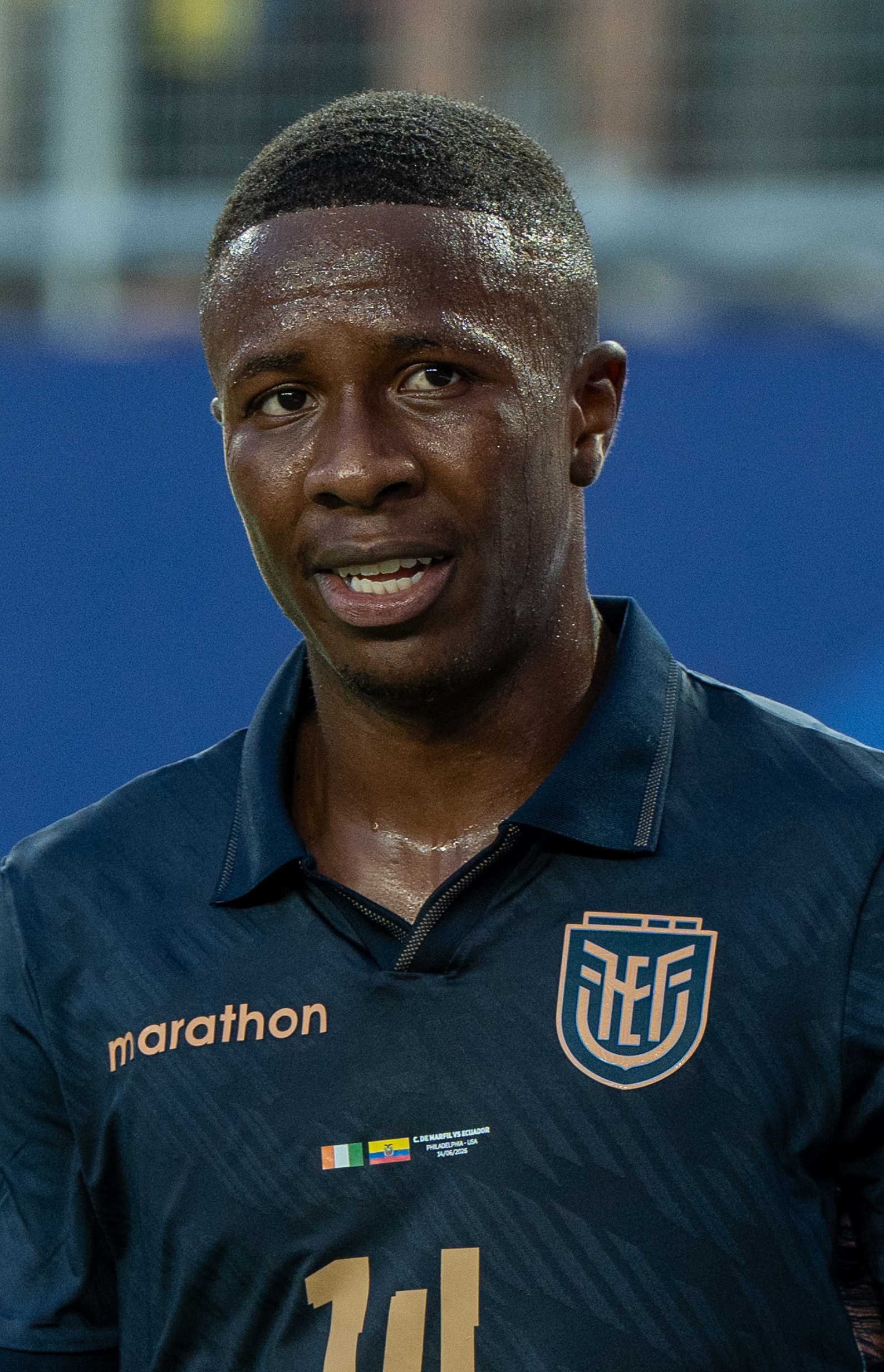
- Minda with Ecuador in 2026

Personal information
- Full name: Alan Steve Minda García
- Date of birth: 14 May 2003 (age 23)
- Place of birth: Esmeraldas, Ecuador
- Height: 1.71 m (5 ft 7 in)
- Position: Winger

Team information
- Current team: Atlético Mineiro
- Number: 27

Youth career
- 2013–2015: El Nacional
- 2016–2022: Independiente del Valle

Senior career*
Years	Team	Apps	(Gls)
2020–2023	Independiente Juniors	29	(10)
2021–2023	Independiente del Valle	31	(3)
2023–2026	Cercle Brugge	84	(12)
2026–	Atlético Mineiro	20	(2)

International career^{‡}
2022–2023	Ecuador U20	13	(3)
2024–	Ecuador	24	(2)
- * Club domestic league appearances and goals as of 19 September 2026 ‡ National team caps and goals as of 5 October 2026

Alan Steve Minda García (born 14 May 2003) is an Ecuadorian professional footballer who plays as a winger for Campeonato Brasileiro Série A club Atlético Mineiro and the Ecuador national team.

== Club career ==
=== Independiente del Valle ===
Born in Esmeraldas, Minda joined Independiente del Valle's youth setup in 2016, from El Nacional. After making his senior debut with the reserve team Independiente Juniors in the 2020 Ecuadorian Serie B, he made his debut with the main squad on 22 May 2021, coming on as a second-half substitute for José Hurtado in a 3–0 Ecuadorian Serie A home win over Guayaquil City.

Minda scored his first professional goal on 1 August 2021, netting his team's third in a 4–0 home routing of Macará. After featuring regularly, he suffered a serious knee injury in December, being sidelined for several months of the 2022 season.

On 18 April 2023, on his Copa Libertadores debut, Minda scored IDV's second in a 2–0 win over Liverpool Montevideo; by doing so, he became the quickest to score for the club after coming on a substitute in the tournament's history.

=== Cercle Brugge ===
On 12 July 2023, Belgian club Cercle Brugge announced the signing of Minda on a five-year contract, for a reported fee of around €2 million.

=== Atlético Mineiro ===
On 6 January 2026, Brazilian club Atlético Mineiro announced an agreement in principle to sign Minda. On 14 January, the deal was confirmed and he signed a five-year contract.

== International career ==
Minda made his debut for the Ecuador national under-20 team in November 2022, in two friendlies against Colombia. He was also included in the side's squads for the 2023 South American U-20 Championship and the 2023 FIFA U-20 World Cup.

Minda made his debut for the senior Ecuador national team on 22 March 2024 in a friendly against Guatemala.

On 31 May 2026, Minda was selected in the 26-man squad for the 2026 FIFA World Cup.

== Career statistics ==
=== Club ===
As of match played 19 September 2026

Appearances and goals by club, season and competition
Club	Season	League			State League		National Cup (Note: Includes Copa Ecuador, Belgian Cup)		Continental		Other		Total	
Club	Season	Division	Apps	Goals	Apps	Goals	Apps	Goals	Apps	Goals	Apps	Goals	Apps	Goals
Independiente Juniors	2021	LigaPro Serie B	12	3	—		—		—		—		12	3
Independiente Juniors	2022	LigaPro Serie B	16	6	—		—		—		—		16	6
Independiente Juniors	2023	LigaPro Serie B	1	1	—		—		—		—		1	1
Independiente Juniors	Total		29	10	—		—		—		—		29	10
Independiente del Valle	2021	LigaPro Serie A	14	2	—		—		2 (Note: Appearance(s) in Copa Sudamericana)	0	0	0	16	2
Independiente del Valle	2022	LigaPro Serie A	11	0	—		4	1	3	0	—		18	1
Independiente del Valle	2023	LigaPro Serie A	6	1	—		0	0	1 (Note: Appearance(s) in Copa Libertadores)	1	1 (Note: Appearance(s) in Recopa Sudamericana)	0	8	2
Independiente del Valle	Total		31	3	—		4	1	6	1	1	0	42	5
Cercle Brugge	2023–24	Belgian Pro League	38	8	—		1	0	—		—		39	8
Cercle Brugge	2024–25	Belgian Pro League	29	1	—		2	0	10 (Note: Two appearances in UEFA Europa League, eight appearances and two goals in UEFA Conference League)	2	1 (Note: Appearances in Belgian Pro League relegation play-offs)	0	42	3
Cercle Brugge	2025–26	Belgian Pro League	17	3	—		1	0	—		—		18	3
Cercle Brugge	Total		84	12	—		4	0	10	2	1	0	99	14
Atlético Mineiro	2026	Série A	16	2	4	0	6	1	7 (Note: Appearances in Copa Sudamericana)	1	—		33	3
Career total			160	27	4	0	14	2	23	3	2	0	203	32

=== International ===
As of match played 5 October 2026

Appearances and goals by national team and year
National team	Year	Apps	Goals
Ecuador	2024	12	2
Ecuador	2025	6	0
Ecuador	2026	6	0
Total		24	2

Scores and results list Venezuela's goal tally first, score column indicates score after each Minda goal.

List of international goals scored by Alan Minda
No.	Date	Venue	Opponent	Score	Result	Competition
1	26 June 2024	Allegiant Stadium, Las Vegas, United States	Jamaica	3–1	3–1	2024 Copa América
2	14 November 2024	Estadio Isidro Romero Carbo, Guayaquil, Ecuador	Bolivia	4–0	4–0	2026 FIFA World Cup qualification

== Honours ==
Independiente del Valle

- Ecuadorian Serie A: 2021
- Copa Ecuador: 2022
- Copa Sudamericana: 2022
- Supercopa Ecuador: 2023
- Recopa Sudamericana: 2023
