= Jesper Daland =

Norwegian footballer (born 2000)

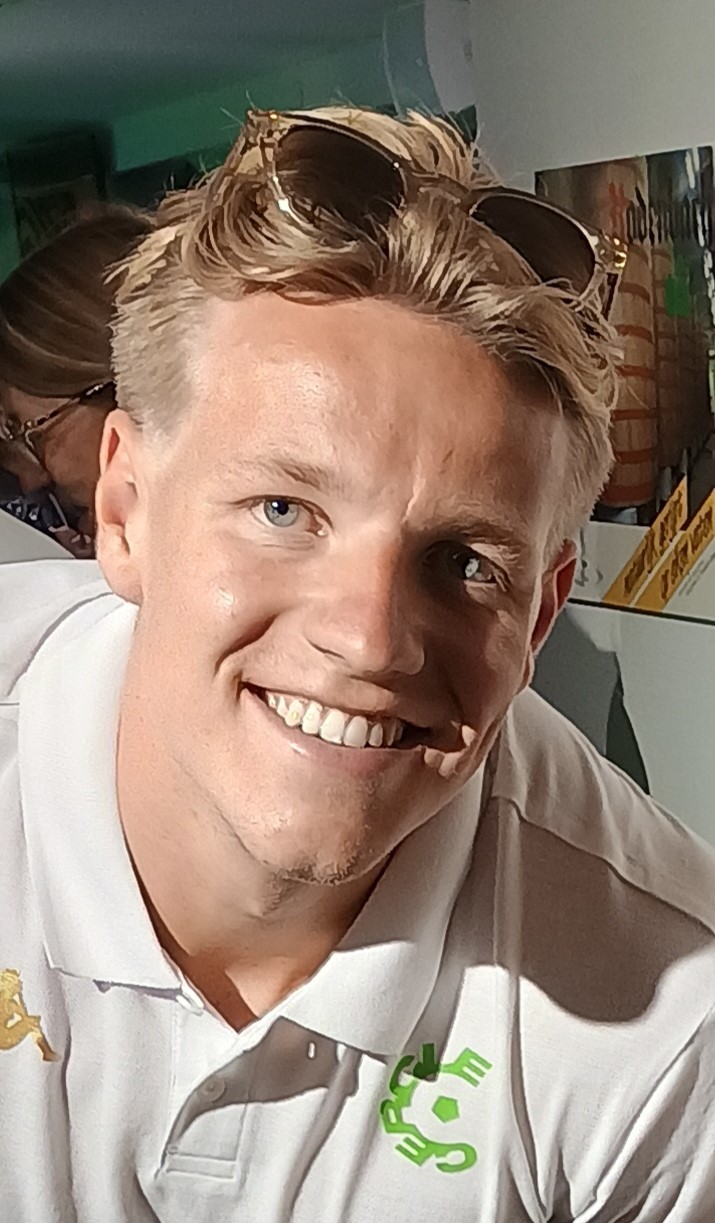
- Jesper Daland in 2024.

Personal information
- Full name: Jesper Norman Daland
- Date of birth: 6 January 2000 (age 26)
- Place of birth: Kristiansand, Norway
- Height: 1.89 m (6 ft 2 in)
- Position: Centre-back

Team information
- Current team: Viking
- Number: 27

Youth career
- 2013–2016: Vigør
- 2016–2018: Stabæk

Senior career*
Years	Team	Apps	(Gls)
2015	Vigør	7	(0)
2019–2021	Start	30	(1)
2021–2024	Cercle Brugge	110	(4)
2024–	Cardiff City	21	(0)
2025–2026	→ Fortuna Düsseldorf (loan)	23	(0)
2026–	→ Viking (loan)	2	(0)

International career^{‡}
2015	Norway U15	3	(0)
2016	Norway U16	17	(2)
2017	Norway U17	7	(0)
2018	Norway U18	13	(1)
2019	Norway U19	1	(0)
2020–2023	Norway U21	15	(1)
- * Club domestic league appearances and goals as of 20 September 2026 (UTC) ‡ National team caps and goals as of 28 March 2023

Jesper Norman Daland (born 6 January 2000) is a Norwegian professional footballer who plays as a centre-back for Eliteserien club Viking, on loan from Cardiff City.

== Club career ==
=== Start ===
Daland signed with Start before the 2019 season. A knee injury ruined his entire first season at the club, which meant that he only made his league debut for the club on 17 June 2020 in a 2–2 draw against Strømsgodset. Four days later, he scored his first league goal in a 2–2 draw against Sandefjord. His strong performances during the 2020 season meant that he was awarded the IK Start Young Player of the Year award in January 2021.

=== Cercle Brugge ===
In May 2021, Daland signed a four-year contract with Belgian Pro League club Cercle Brugge. He made his debut as a starter on 24 July 2021 in a match against Beerschot which was interrupted after 55 minutes due to heavy rainfall. The match was continued on 27 July, and ended in a 1–0 win for Cercle.

=== Cardiff City ===
On 20 August 2024, Daland signed for EFL Championship club Cardiff City on a four-year deal for an undisclosed fee.

=== Fortuna Düsseldorf ===
On 30 August 2025, Daland joined 2. Bundesliga club Fortuna Düsseldorf on a season-long loan with an option to buy.

== Career statistics ==
As of match played 17 May 2026

Appearances and goals by club, season and competition
Club	Season	League			National cup (Note: Includes Norwegian Cup, Belgian Cup, FA Cup, DFB-Pokal)		League cup (Note: Includes EFL Cup)		Other		Total	
Club	Season	Division	Apps	Goals	Apps	Goals	Apps	Goals	Apps	Goals	Apps	Goals
Vigør	2015	Norwegian Third Division	7	0	0	0	—		—		7	0
Start	2020	Eliteserien	30	1	0	0	—		—		30	1
Cercle Brugge	2021–22	Belgian Pro League	32	2	1	0	—		—		33	2
Cercle Brugge	2022–23	Belgian Pro League	37	1	2	0	—		—		39	1
Cercle Brugge	2023–24	Belgian Pro League	39	1	1	0	—		—		40	1
Cercle Brugge	2024–25	Belgian Pro League	2	0	0	0	—		4 (Note: Appearances in UEFA Europa League)	0	6	0
Cercle Brugge	Total		110	4	4	0	—		4	0	118	4
Cardiff City	2024–25	Championship	20	0	2	0	—		—		22	0
Cardiff City	2025–26	EFL League One	1	0	0	0	0	0	0	0	1	0
Cardiff City	Total		21	0	2	0	0	0	0	0	23	0
Fortuna Düsseldorf (loan)	2025–26	2. Bundesliga	23	0	1	0	—		—		24	0
Viking (loan)	2026	Eliteserien	0	0	0	0	—		—		0	0
Career total			191	5	7	0	0	0	4	0	202	5
