= Malamine Efekele =

French footballer (born 2004)

Personal information
- Full name: Malamine Efekele
- Date of birth: 19 July 2004 (age 22)
- Place of birth: Livry-Gargan, France
- Height: 1.80 m (5 ft 11 in)
- Position: Forward

Team information
- Current team: St. Gallen
- Number: 21

Youth career
- 2012–2019: AS Bondy
- 2019–2023: Monaco

Senior career*
Years	Team	Apps	(Gls)
2023–2025	Monaco	0	(0)
2024–2025	→ Cercle Brugge (loan)	23	(1)
2025–	St. Gallen	19	(0)

International career^{‡}
2023	France U19	3	(1)
2023–2024	France U20	7	(0)
- * Club domestic league appearances and goals as of 26 May 2026 ‡ National team caps and goals as of 25 March 2024

Malamine Efekele (born 19 July 2004) is a French professional footballer who plays for Swiss Super League club St. Gallen.

== Club career ==
Born in Livry-Gargan, Malamine Efekele joined the AS Monaco academy in 2019, from the Bondy football club, after also spending some time in the INF Clairefontaine.

During the 2021–22 season, despite being sidelined for several months because of injury, he was among the top goalscorer of Monaco under-19s.

Efekele signed his first professional contract with the club on the summer 2022, then making headlines for his striking resemblance to Kylian Mbappé, both in term of profile—a Bondy-grown paced striker playing in the Monaco academy—and physical appearance.

The following season, he played both the Championnat U19 and the Premier League International Cup, emerging as one of the standouts of the academy by March 2023, having proven to be decisive against the likes of West Ham, as he scored a brace in a 2–1 away International Cup win against them.

On 24 January 2024, Efekele moved on loan to Cercle Brugge in Belgium.

On 28 August 2025, Efekele signed a two-season contract with Swiss club St. Gallen.

== International career ==
Efekele was born in France and is of DR Congolese descent. He was called up to a training camp for the DR Congo U20s in December 2021. He is a youth international for France, first receiving a call with the under-19 in March 2023, along the likes of Warren Zaïre-Emery and Mathys Tel.

In May 2023, he was selected with France under-20s for the FIFA World Cup.

== Honours ==
Monaco U19

- Championnat National U19 runner-up: 2021–22

== Career statistics ==
=== Club ===
As of match played 17 March 2026

Appearances and goals by club, season and competition
Club	Season	League			National cup (Note: Includes Coupe de France, Belgian Cup and Swiss Cup)		Continental		Other		Total	
Club	Season	Division	Apps	Goals	Apps	Goals	Apps	Goals	Apps	Goals	Apps	Goals
Monaco	2023–24	Ligue 1	0	0	0	0	—		—		0	0
Monaco	2024–25	Ligue 1	0	0	0	0	0	0	0	0	0	0
Monaco	Total		0	0	0	0	0	0	0	0	0	0
Cercle Brugge (loan)	2023–24	Belgian Pro League	10	1	—		—		—		10	1
Cercle Brugge (loan)	2024–25	Belgian Pro League	13	0	2	0	7 (Note: Appearance(s) in UEFA Europa Conference League)	1	2 (Note: Appearance(s) in Belgian Pro League Promotion/Relegation play-off)	0	24	1
Cercle Brugge (loan)	Total		23	1	2	0	7	1	2	0	34	2
St. Gallen	2025–26	Swiss Super League	17	0	3	0	—		—		20	0
Career total			40	1	5	0	7	1	2	0	54	2
