= Kazeem Olaigbe =

Belgian footballer (born 2003)

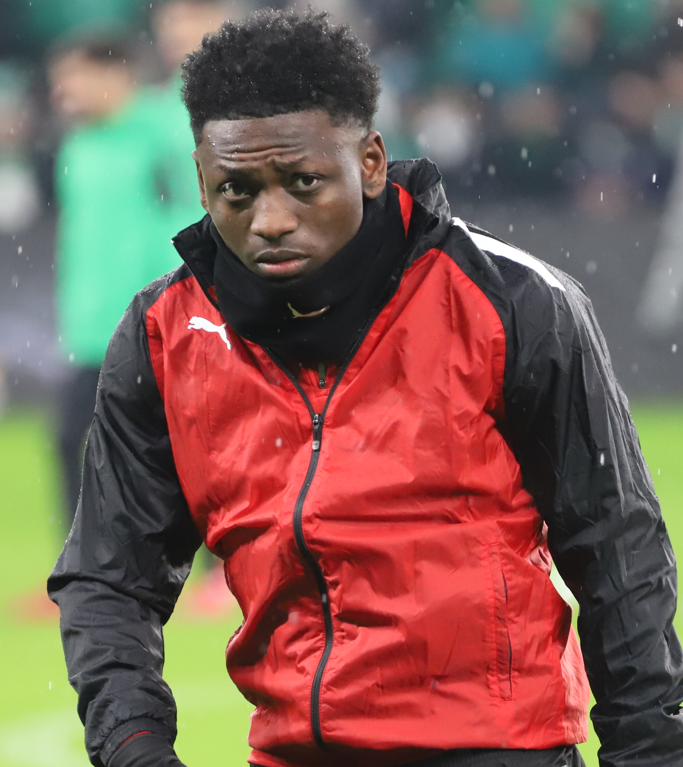
- Olaigbe with Rennes in 2025

Personal information
- Full name: Kazeem Aderemi J Olaigbe
- Date of birth: 2 January 2003 (age 23)
- Place of birth: Brussels, Belgium
- Height: 1.78 m (5 ft 10 in)
- Position: Winger

Team information
- Current team: FC Basel (on loan from Trabzonspor)
- Number: 11

Youth career
- –2019: Anderlecht
- 2019–2022: Southampton

Senior career*
Years	Team	Apps	(Gls)
2022–2023	Southampton	0	(0)
2022–2023	→ Ross County (loan)	19	(0)
2023	→ Harrogate Town (loan)	19	(3)
2023–2025	Cercle Brugge	47	(7)
2025	Rennes	10	(0)
2025–	Trabzonspor	18	(0)
2026	→ Konyaspor (loan)	13	(0)
2026–	→ FC Basel (loan)	12	(2)

International career^{‡}
2018	Belgium U15	4	(0)
2018–2019	Belgium U16	11	(3)
2019	Belgium U17	6	(3)
2021–2022	Belgium U19	5	(0)
2022	Belgium U20	2	(0)
2023–2024	Belgium U21	13	(4)
- * Club domestic league appearances and goals as of 06:25, 14 November 2026 (UTC) ‡ National team caps and goals as of 18:37, 30 November 2024 (UTC)

Kazeem Aderemi Olaigbe (born 2 January 2003) is a Belgian professional footballer who plays as a winger for Swiss Super League club FC Basel, on loan from Süper Lig club Trabzonspor. He has represented Belgium at youth international level.

== Club career ==
Olaigbe began his career with Anderlecht before joining Southampton in the summer of 2019. On 15 February 2022, Olaigbe signed a contract extension with Southampton until June 2024.

On 27 June 2022, Olaigbe joined Ross County on a season-long loan. On 16 July 2022, Olaigbe made his first professional appearance for Ross County in the Scottish League Cup in their 1–1 (3–4 pens) victory against Buckie Thistle, coming on as a substitute to replace Owura Edwards in the 66th minute. Ten days later, Olaigbe started his first professional match for the club in a 2–0 win against Alloa Athletic in the Scottish League Cup, and provided an assist for Josh Sims. Olaigbe returned to his parent club on 31 January 2023. Later that day, he joined League Two side Harrogate Town on loan until the end of the season.

Olaigbe joined Belgian Pro League club Cercle Brugge on 29 August 2023.

On 3 February 2025, he joined Ligue 1 side Rennes on a four-and-a-half year contract.

On 7 August 2025, Olaigbe moved to Trabzonspor in Turkey. On 5 February 2026, he joined Konyaspor on loan for the remainder of the 2025–26 season.

On 2 July 2026, Olaigbe joined FC Basel on a season-long loan.

== International career ==
Born in Belgium, Olaigbe is of Nigerian descent. He has represented Belgium at under-17 and under-19 levels.

== Career statistics ==
=== Club ===
As of match played 8 November 2026

Appearances and goals by club, season and competition
Club	Season	League			National cup		League cup		Other		Total	
Club	Season	Division	Apps	Goals	Apps	Goals	Apps	Goals	Apps	Goals	Apps	Goals
Southampton U21	2019–20	–			–		–		1 (Note: Appearances in EFL Trophy)	0	1	0
Southampton U21	2020–21	–			–		–		3	1	3	1
Southampton U21	2021–22	–			–		–		2	2	2	2
Southampton U21	Total		0	0	0	0	0	0	6	3	6	3
Ross County (loan)	2022–23	Scottish Premiership	19	0	1	0	5	2	–		25	2
Harrogate Town (loan)	2022–23	League Two	19	3	—		—		—		19	3
Cercle Brugge	2023–24	Belgian Pro League	28	4	1	0	—		—		29	4
Cercle Brugge	2024–25	Belgian Pro League	19	3	2	0	—		10 (Note: Four appearances in UEFA Europa League, six appearances in UEFA Conference League)	5	31	8
Cercle Brugge	Total		47	7	3	0	0	0	10	5	60	12
Rennes	2024–25	Ligue 1	10	0	0	0	—		—		10	0
Trabzonspor	2025–26	Süper Lig	18	0	3	1	—		—		21	1
Konyaspor (loan)	2025–26	Süper Lig	13	0	2	0	—		—		15	0
FC Basel (loan)	2026–27	Swiss Super League	12	2	2	1	—		—		14	3
Career total			138	12	11	2	5	2	16	8	170	24
