= Emmanuel Kakou =

Ivorian footballer (born 2005)

Personal information
- Full name: Emmanuel Junior Kakou
- Date of birth: 30 June 2005 (age 21)
- Place of birth: Ivory Coast
- Height: 1.79 m (5 ft 10 in)
- Position: Centre-back

Team information
- Current team: Cercle Brugge
- Number: 5

Youth career
- Reference Foot Academy

Senior career*
Years	Team	Apps	(Gls)
2024–2025	Jong Cercle	15	(1)
2024–	Cercle Brugge	43	(3)

International career^{‡}
2026–	Ivory Coast U23	1	(0)
- * Club domestic league appearances and goals as of 11 May 2026 ‡ National team caps and goals as of 15:09, 27 March 2026 (UTC)

Emmanuel Junior Kakou (born 30 June 2005) is an Ivorian professional football player who plays as a centre-back for Belgian Pro League club Cercle Brugge.

== Career ==
A product of the Reference Foot Academy in the Ivory Coast, on 29 January 2024 Kakou signed a contract with Jong Cercle until 30 June 2026. On 22 September 2024, he made his debut with the senior Cercle Brugge squad in a 2–0 Belgian Pro League loss to KV Mechelen. On 8 July 2025, was formally promoted and signed a contract with Cercle Brugge until 2027.

== International career ==
Kakou was called up to the Ivory Coast U23s for a set of friendlies in March 2026.
