= Abdoul Kader Ouattara =

Burkinabé footballer (born 2005)

Personal information
- Date of birth: 26 May 2005 (age 21)
- Height: 1.71 m (5 ft 7 in)
- Position: Forward

Team information
- Current team: Cercle Brugge
- Number: 7

Youth career
- Rahimo FC

Senior career*
Years	Team	Apps	(Gls)
–2023	Rahimo FC		
2023–	Cercle Brugge	18	(2)

International career^{‡}
2023–	Burkina Faso	4	(0)
- * Club domestic league appearances and goals as of 10 March 2026 ‡ National team caps and goals as of 13 October 2024

Abdoul Kader Ouattara (born 26 May 2005) is a Burkinabé professional footballer who plays as a forward for Belgian Pro League club Cercle Brugge.

== Club career ==
Ouattara joined Cercle Brugge in 2023 from Rahimo FC. He made his professional debut for Cercle Brugge on 4 February 2024, in a 4–1 Belgian Pro League home win against Sint-Truiden. Ouattara extended his contract with Cercle Brugge until 2028 on 16 August 2024.

== International career ==
On 22 March 2024, Ouattara made his full debut for the Burkina Faso national team against Libya national football team.
