= Maxime Delanghe =

Belgian footballer (born 2001)

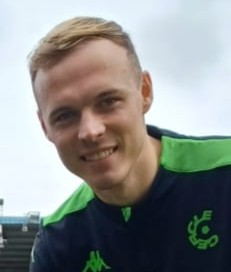
- Delanghe with Cercle Brugge in 2025

Personal information
- Date of birth: 23 May 2001 (age 25)
- Place of birth: Halle, Belgium
- Height: 1.89 m (6 ft 2 in)
- Position: Goalkeeper

Team information
- Current team: Willem II
- Number: 26

Youth career
- FC Pepingen
- –2017: Anderlecht
- 2017–2020: PSV

Senior career*
Years	Team	Apps	(Gls)
2020–2021	Jong PSV	28	(0)
2020–2022	PSV	0	(0)
2022–2023	Lierse	18	(0)
2023–2026	Cercle Brugge	42	(0)
2026–	Willem II	4	(0)

International career
2016	Belgium U15	2	(0)
2016–2017	Belgium U16	5	(0)
2017–2018	Belgium U17	8	(0)
2018–2019	Belgium U18	4	(0)
2020	Belgium U19	1	(0)
2022–2023	Belgium U21	3	(0)
- * Club domestic league appearances and goals as of 20:32, 27 September 2026 (UTC)

Maxime Delanghe (born 23 May 2001) is a Belgian professional footballer who plays as a goalkeeper for Eredivisie club Willem II.

== Club career ==
On 4 August 2022, Delanghe signed a one-year contract with Lierse with an option to extend for the second year.

On 15 June 2023, Delanghe signed for Belgian Pro League club Cercle Brugge on a two-year contract with the option for a further year.

== Career statistics ==
As of 15 September 2020

Appearances and goals by club, season and competition
Club	Season	League			National cup		Continental		Other		Total	
Club	Season	Division	Apps	Goals	Apps	Goals	Apps	Goals	Apps	Goals	Apps	Goals
Jong PSV	2020–21	Eerste Divisie	3	0	—		—		0	0	3	0
Career total			3	0	0	0	0	0	0	0	3	0

== Honours ==
PSV

- KNVB Cup: 2021–22
