= Erick Nunes =

Brazilian footballer (born 2004)

Personal information
- Full name: Erick Nunes Barbosa dos Santos
- Date of birth: 29 February 2004 (age 22)
- Place of birth: São Paulo, Brazil
- Height: 1.80 m (5 ft 11 in)
- Position: Defensive midfielder

Team information
- Current team: Cercle Brugge
- Number: 8

Youth career
- 2017–2024: Fluminense

Senior career*
Years	Team	Apps	(Gls)
2024–2025	Fluminense	0	(0)
2024	→ Jong Cercle (loan)	6	(2)
2024–2025	→ Cercle Brugge (loan)	27	(0)
2025–	Cercle Brugge	15	(0)
- * Club domestic league appearances and goals as of 11 February 2026

Erick Nunes Barbosa dos Santos (born 29 February 2004) is a Brazilian professional football player who plays as a defensive midfielder for Belgian Pro League club Cercle Brugge.

== Career ==
Nunes joined the youth academy of Fluminense in 2017 and worked his way up their youth levels. On 8 January 2024, he joined the Belgian Pro League club Cercle Brugge for the second half of the 2024–25 season, with the option to extend for another season. Originally assigned to their reserves, on 11 August 2024 he made his league debut in a 4–1 win over Beerschot. On 26 April 2025, he permanently signed with Cercle Brugge on a contract until 2029 after a successful loan with 1 goal and 2 assist in 40 matches with the senior team.
