= Felipe Augusto (footballer, born 2004) =

Brazilian footballer

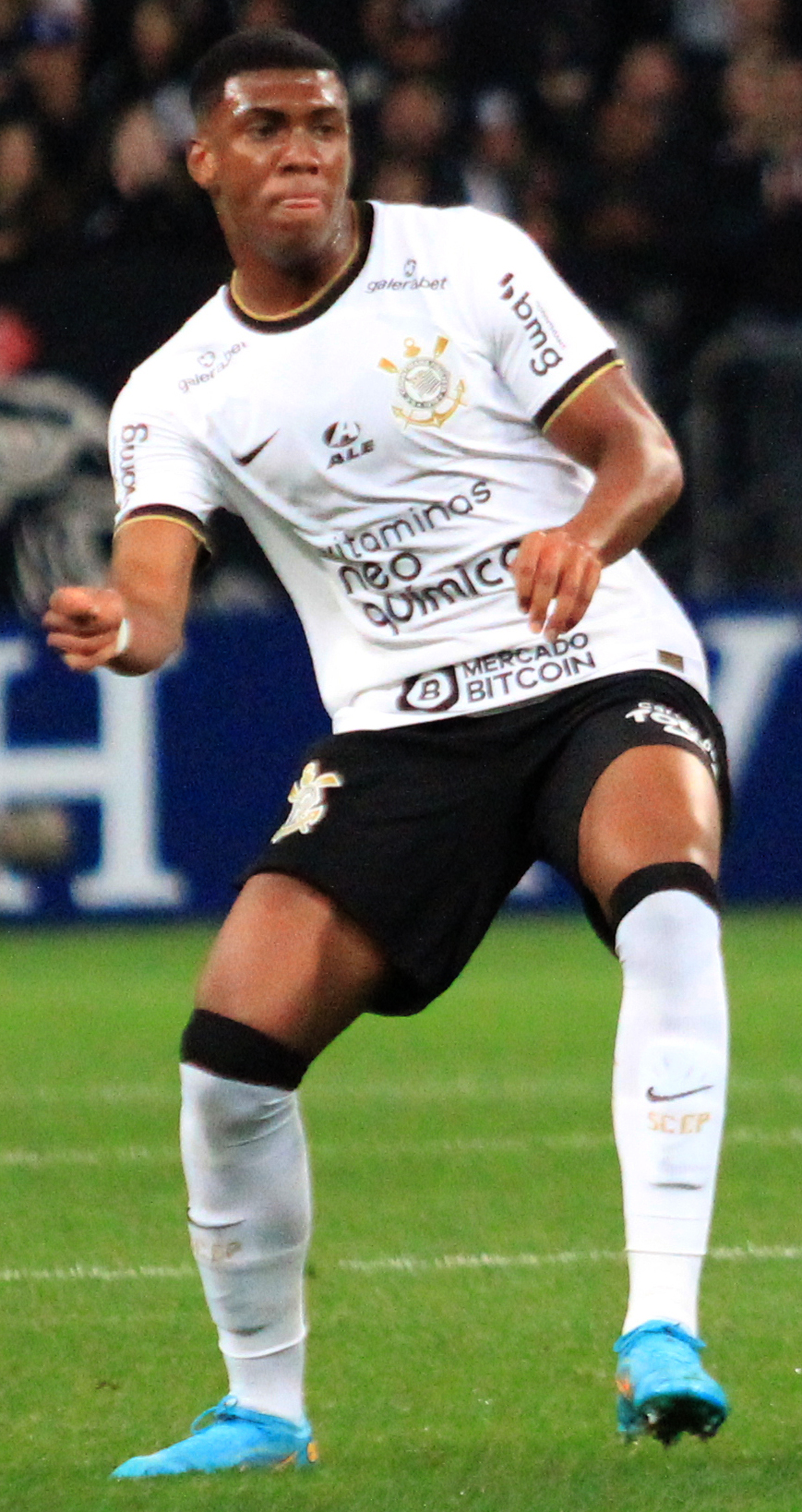

Personal information
- Full name: Felipe Augusto da Silva
- Date of birth: 18 February 2004 (age 22)
- Place of birth: São Paulo, Brazil
- Height: 1.87 m (6 ft 2 in)
- Position: Forward

Team information
- Current team: Zenit St. Petersburg
- Number: 9

Youth career
- 2017-2023: Corinthians

Senior career*
Years	Team	Apps	(Gls)
2021–2023	Corinthians	22	(2)
2024–2025	Cercle Brugge	49	(4)
2025–2026	Trabzonspor	32	(13)
2026–	Zenit St. Petersburg	14	(2)
- * Club domestic league appearances and goals as of 21 November 2026

Felipe Augusto da Silva (born 18 February 2004), known as Felipe Augusto, is a Brazilian professional footballer who plays as a forward for Russian club Zenit St. Petersburg.

== Career ==
On 6 January 2024, Felipe Augusto signed a 4.5-year contract with Cercle Brugge in Belgium.

On 29 June 2026, Felipe Augusto signed a contract with Russian Premier League champions Zenit St. Petersburg for four years, with an option for a fifth year.

== Career statistics ==
As of match played 21 November 2026

Club	Season	League			State league (Note: Includes Campeonato Paulista)		National cup (Note: Includes Copa do Brasil, Belgian Cup, Turkish Cup)		Continental		Other		Total	
Club	Season	Division	Apps	Goals	Apps	Goals	Apps	Goals	Apps	Goals	Apps	Goals	Apps	Goals
Corinthians	2021	Série A	3	0	1	0	—		—		—		4	0
Corinthians	2022	Série A	3	0	—		1	0	—		—		4	0
Corinthians	2023	Série A	15	0	—		2	0	4 (Note: One appearance and one goal in Copa Libertadores, three appearances and one goal in Copa Sudamericana)	2	—		21	2
Corinthians	Total		21	0	1	0	3	0	4	2	—		29	2
Cercle Brugge	2023–24	Belgian Pro League	18	2	—		—		—		—		18	2
Cercle Brugge	2024–25	Belgian Pro League	31	2	—		1	0	14 (Note: Four appearances in UEFA Europa League, ten appearances and three goals in UEFA Conference League)	3	—		46	5
Cercle Brugge	Total		49	4	—		1	0	14	3	—		64	7
Trabzonspor	2025–26	Süper Lig	32	13	—		7	1	—		1 (Note: Appearance in Turkish Super Cup)	1	40	15
Zenit Saint Petersburg	2026–27	Russian Premier League	14	2	—		5	2	—		1 (Note: Appearance in Russian Super Cup)	0	20	4
Career total			116	19	1	0	16	3	18	5	2	1	153	28

== Honours ==
Trabzonspor

- Turkish Cup: 2025–26

Zenit Saint Petersburg

- Russian Super Cup: 2026
