= Christiaan Ravych =

Belgian footballer

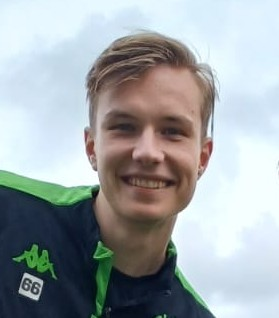
- Christiaan Ravych in 2025.

Personal information
- Date of birth: 30 July 2002 (age 24)
- Place of birth: Kortrijk, Belgium
- Height: 1.87 m (6 ft 2 in)
- Position: Defensive midfielder

Team information
- Current team: Genk
- Number: 5

Youth career
- Club Brugge
- 2021–2022: Cercle Brugge

Senior career*
Years	Team	Apps	(Gls)
2022	Jong Cercle	1	(1)
2022–2026	Cercle Brugge	120	(3)
2026–	Genk	0	(0)

International career
2019	Belgium U17	3	(1)
2022	Belgium U20	1	(0)
2024	Belgium U21	1	(0)
- * Club domestic league appearances and goals as of 20 September 2026

Christiaan Ravych (born 30 July 2002) is a Belgian professional footballer who plays as a centre back for Belgian Pro League club Genk.

== Personal life ==
He is of Ukrainian descent.

== Professional career ==
Ravych is a youth product of the academy of Club Brugge, and moved to the neighboring club Cercle Brugge in 2021. On 8 December 2021, he signed a semi-professional contract with Cercle. He made his professional debut with Cercle Brugge as a substitute replacing an injured Edgaras Utkus in a 1–0 Belgian First Division A win over Anderlecht on 30 July 2022.

On 1 September 2026, Ravych signed a four-year contract with Genk.

== International career ==
Ravych is a youth international for Belgium, having played up to the Belgium U17s.

He has expressed his interest in playing for the Ukraine national team.
