= Abu Francis =

Ghanaian footballer

Personal information
- Date of birth: 27 April 2001 (age 25)
- Place of birth: Accra, Ghana
- Height: 1.82 m (6 ft 0 in)
- Position: Midfielder

Team information
- Current team: Toulouse
- Number: 17

Youth career
- Right to Dream
- 2019–2021: Nordsjælland

Senior career*
Years	Team	Apps	(Gls)
2019–2022	Nordsjælland	55	(8)
2022–2025	Cercle Brugge	82	(2)
2025–	Toulouse	8	(0)

International career^{‡}
2024–	Ghana	6	(0)
- * Club domestic league appearances and goals as of 19 May 2026 ‡ National team caps and goals as of 14:39, 11 October 2025 (UTC)

Abu Francis (born 27 April 2001) is a French-Ghanaian professional footballer who plays as a midfielder for Ligue 1 club Toulouse and the Ghana national team.

== Club career ==
=== Nordsjælland ===
Francis was born in Ghana and was a part of the academy at Right to Dream and joined FC Nordsjælland in the summer 2019. Before his move to Nordsjælland in the summer 2019, Francis had already played a reserve team game for the club in July 2017 and three games for the U19's in the Torneo di Viareggio in March 2019. While playing at Right to Dream, Francis among other things was named as the best player at a J-League Youth tournament in Japan, scoring two goals in the final and helping his team lift the title.

He got his FC Nordsjælland debut on 14 July 2019 in the first league game of the 2019/20 season. Francis was in the starting line up in a 3–0 victory against AC Horsens in the Danish Superliga and played 74 minutes. On 25 July 2019 Nordsjælland announced, that they had extended Francis' contract until June 2023.

=== Cercle Brugge ===
With a year left of his contract with Nordsjælland, the club confirmed on 19 August 2022, that Abu Francis had been sold to Belgian First Division A side Cercle Brugge, with the player signing a deal until June 2025 with an option for an additional season. Francis got his debut for the Belgian side on 27 August 2022 against Zulte Waregem.

=== Toulouse ===
On 6 August 2025, Francis joined French Ligue 1 club Toulouse FC on a deal until June 2029. Francis also became the first Ghanaian player in the clubs history. Francis made his debut on 14 September 2025 against Lille.

== International career ==
Francis made his debut for Ghana in March 2024, in a friendly match against Uganda. On 14 November 2025, Francis suffered a serious injury while playing for Ghana in a friendly match against Japan, ending his season and causing him to miss the 2026 FIFA World Cup.
