= 2022–23 KV Mechelen season =

K.V. Mechelen
2022–23 season
- Manager: Danny Buijs (until 17 October); Steven Defour (from 17 October)
- Stadium: Achter de Kazerne
- Belgian Pro League: 13th
- Belgian Cup: Runners-up

The 2022–23 K.V. Mechelen season was the club's 119th season in existence and the fourth consecutive season in the top flight of Belgian football. In addition to the domestic league, Mechelen participated in this season's edition of the Belgian Cup. The season covered the period from 1 July 2022 to 30 June 2023.

== Players ==
=== First-team squad ===
As of 11 January 2023

Note: Flags indicate national team as defined under FIFA eligibility rules; some limited exceptions apply. Players may hold more than one non-FIFA nationality.

No.	Pos.	Nation	Player
1	GK	BEL	Gaëtan Coucke
2	DF	BEL	Iebe Swers
3	DF	NED	Lucas Bijker
4	MF	BEL	Dries Wouters (on loan from Schalke)
5	DF	IDN	Sandy Walsh
6	MF	BEL	Jannes Van Hecke
7	MF	BEL	Geoffry Hairemans
8	MF	MEX	Jorge Hernandez
9	FW	BEL	Julien Ngoy
10	FW	ISR	Yonas Malede
11	FW	BEL	Nikola Storm
14	DF	BEL	Dimitri Lavalée
15	GK	BEL	Yannick Thoelen
16	MF	BEL	Rob Schoofs
17	MF	CMR	Samuel Gouet

No.	Pos.	Nation	Player
18	DF	BEL	Alec Van Hoorenbeeck
19	FW	SWE	Kerim Mrabti
21	DF	BEL	Boli Bolingoli
22	FW	CPV	Alessio da Cruz
23	DF	FRA	Thibault Peyre
26	FW	BEL	Jules Houttequiet
27	DF	SCO	David Bates
28	FW	BEL	Frederic Soelle Soelle
30	DF	BEL	Jordi Vanlerberghe
31	GK	BEL	Oskar Annell
32	GK	BEL	Rayane Falchou
34	FW	MAR	Ilyas Lefrancq
37	MF	BEL	Bas Van den Eynden
39	FW	BEL	Milan Robberechts
66	MF	BEL	Birger Verstraete (on loan from Antwerp)

=== Out on loan ===
Note: Flags indicate national team as defined under FIFA eligibility rules; some limited exceptions apply. Players may hold more than one non-FIFA nationality.

No.	Pos.	Nation	Player
—	GK	BEL	Arno Valkenaers (to Thes Sport until 30 June 2022)
—	DF	BEL	Dylan Dassy (to Helmond Sport until 30 June 2023)
—	DF	BEL	Toon Raemaekers (to Lierse Kempenzonen until 30 June 2023)
—	DF	SWE	Victor Wernersson (to Stabæk until 31 December 2022)
—	MF	BEL	Gaétan Bosiers (to Helmond Sport until 30 June 2023)

No.	Pos.	Nation	Player
—	MF	BEL	Jarno Lion (to Helmond Sport until 30 June 2023)
—	FW	SWE	Gustav Engvall (to Sarpsborg until 31 December 2022)
—	FW	BEL	Chris Kalulika (to Helmond Sport until 30 June 2023)
—	FW	CIV	William Togui (to Hapoel Jerusalem until 30 June 2023)

=== Other players under contract ===
Note: Flags indicate national team as defined under FIFA eligibility rules; some limited exceptions apply. Players may hold more than one non-FIFA nationality.

No.	Pos.	Nation	Player
—	FW	BEL	Niklo Dailly

== Pre-season and friendlies ==
Win Draw Loss Fixtures

25 June 2022 Friendly	Kortrijk (Belgium)	3–1	(Belgium) Mechelen	Kortrijk
15:30 CEST (UTC+2)	Guèye 9', 40'; Henen 33'	Report	? 54'	Stadium: Guldensporen Stadion

2 July 2022 Friendly	Antwerp (Belgium)	4–0	(Belgium) Mechelen	Antwerp
16:00 CEST (UTC+2)	Scott 48'; Benson 78'; Miyoshi 86'; Janssen 110' (pen.); ? (yellow card) 110'	Report	Schoofs (yellow card) 36'	Stadium: Bosuilstadion

9 July 2022 Friendly	Mechelen (Belgium)	1–0	(Israel) Maccabi Haifa	Mechelen
15:00 CEST (UTC+2)	Jorge Hernandez (yellow card) 51'; Schoofs 90+2'	Report	Lavi (yellow card) 30'; Levi (yellow card) 78'	Stadium: Achter de Kazerne

13 July 2022 Friendly	Mechelen (Belgium)	0–0	(Belgium) RWDM	Sint-Katelijne-Waver
15:30 CEST (UTC+2)		Report	Vorogovskiy (yellow card) 20'; Sankhon (yellow card) 56'	Stadium: Complex Kon. FC Katelijne

16 July 2022 Friendly	Mechelen (Belgium)	3–4	(Germany) VfL Wolfsburg	Alkmaar, Netherlands
16:00 CEST (UTC+2)	Shved 43'; Hernandez 57'; Vanlerberghe (yellow card) 70'; Hairemans 78'	Report	L. Nmecha 9'; Waldschmidt 11'; Marmoush 33'; Baku 36'	Stadium: AFAS Stadion

4 December 2022 Friendly	NAC Breda (Netherlands)	0–2	(Belgium) Mechelen	Breda, Netherlands
14:00 CET (UTC+1)		Report		Stadium: Rat Verlegh Stadion

14 December 2022 Friendly	Espanyol (Spain)	1–1	(Belgium) Mechelen	San Pedro del Pinatar, Spain
12:00 CET (UTC+1)		Report		Stadium: Pinatar Arena

== Competitions ==
=== Overview ===
Competition	First match	Last match	Starting round	Final position	Record							
Competition	First match	Last match	Starting round	Final position	Pld	W	D	L	GF	GA	GD	Win %
Belgian Pro League	24 July 2022	May 2023	Matchday 1	13th	34	11	7	16	49	63	−14	32.35
Belgian Cup	9 November 2022	30 April 2023	Sixth round	Runners-up	6	5	0	1	10	3	+7	83.33
Total					40	16	7	17	59	66	−7	40.00

Source: Soccerway

=== Belgian Pro League ===
==== League table ====
Pos	Team	Pld	W	D	L	GF	GA	GD	Pts
11	Anderlecht	34	13	7	14	49	46	+3	46
12	Sint-Truiden	34	11	9	14	37	40	−3	42
13	Mechelen	34	11	7	16	49	63	−14	40
14	Kortrijk	34	8	7	19	37	61	−24	31
15	Eupen	34	7	7	20	40	75	−35	28

Source: Jupiler Pro League (in Dutch), Soccerway
Rules for classification: 1) Points; 2) Matches won; 3) Goal difference; 4) Goals scored; 5) Away matches won; 6) Away goal difference; 7) Away goals scored; 8) Play-off.

==== Results summary ====
Overall								Home						Away					
Pld	W	D	L	GF	GA	GD	Pts	W	D	L	GF	GA	GD	W	D	L	GF	GA	GD
25	7	6	12	35	46	−11	27	6	5	3	27	23	+4	1	1	9	8	23	−15

Last updated: 17 February 2023.
Source: Jupiler Pro League

==== Results by round ====
Round	1	2	3	4	5	6	7	8	9	10	11	12	13	14	15	16	17	18	19	20	21	22	23	24
Ground	H	A	H	A	H	A	H	A	H	A	H	A	H	H	A	H	A	H	A	H	A	H	A	H
Result	L	L	W	D	W	L	L	W	D	L	L	L	W	W	L	D	W	D	L	W	L	W	L	D
Position	14	17	12	11	8	10	11	10	12	12	12	13	13	10	13	13	13	12	13	12	12	11	12	12

Updated to match(es) played on 5 February 2023. Source: Calendar
A = Away; H = Home; W = Win; D = Draw; L = Loss

==== Matches ====
The league fixtures were announced on 22 June 2022.

24 July 2022 1	Mechelen	0–2	Antwerp	Mechelen
16:00 CEST (UTC+2)	Vanlerberghe (yellow card) 23'	Report	Frey 31', 35' (pen.); Alderweireld (yellow card) 50'	Stadium: Achter de Kazerne; Attendance: 11,565; Referee: Erik Lambrechts

30 July 2022 2	Oostende	2–1	Mechelen	Ostend
18:15 CEST (UTC+2)	Atanga 17', 43'; Albanese (red card) 55'; Bätzner (yellow card) 65'	Report	Shved (yellow card) 63'; Peyre 75'; Van Hoorenbeeck (yellow card) 89'	Stadium: Albertpark; Attendance: 3,569; Referee: Wim Smet

6 August 2022 3	Mechelen	3–0	Union SG	Mechelen
20:45 CEST (UTC+2)	Schoofs 44'; Walsh 51'; Ngoy 59'; Lavalée (yellow card) 60'; Schoofs (yellow card) 65'	Report	Boone (yellow card) 11'; Ziani (yellow card) 56'; Teuma (yellow card) 58'; Lapoussin (yellow card) 88'; Puertas (yellow card) 90+1'	Stadium: Achter de Kazerne; Attendance: 11,521; Referee: Jasper Vergoote

13 August 2022 4	Cercle Brugge	0–0	Mechelen	Bruges
18:15 CEST (UTC+2)	Somers (yellow card) 90+5'	Report	Hairemans (yellow card) 11'; Bolingoli (yellow card) 34'; Hernandez (yellow card) 89'; Van Hoorenbeeck (yellow card) 90+5'	Stadium: Jan Breydel Stadium; Attendance: 3,851; Referee: Wesli De Cremer

21 August 2022 5	Mechelen	5–4	Westerlo	Mechelen
21:00 CEST (UTC+2)	Hairemans 39', 48'; Schoofs (yellow card) 63' (goal) 76'; Robberechts 77', 85'	Report	Bernát (yellow card) 22'; Nene 26'; Dierckx 60' (pen.), 63'; Foster 73'; Van den Keybus (yellow card) 90'	Stadium: Achter de Kazerne; Attendance: 12,157; Referee: Bert Put

27 August 2022 6	STVV	3–1	Mechelen	Sint-Truiden
20:45 CEST (UTC+2)	Al Dakhil (yellow card) 52'; Kagawa 57'; Bruno 76', 90+5'	Report	Gouet (yellow card) 51'; Hairemans 53'; Walsh (yellow card) 75'; Van Hoorenbeeck (yellow card) 82'	Stadium: Stayen; Attendance: 4,987; Referee: Wim Smet

3 September 2022 7	Mechelen	2–3	Seraing	Mechelen
18:15 CEST (UTC+2)	Ngoy (yellow card) 13'; Peyre 27'; Walsh 44'; Wouters (yellow card) 50'	Report	Thoelen 22' (o.g.); Mouandilmadji (yellow card) 25', (goal) 71', 81'; Sylla (yellow card) 75'	Stadium: Achter de Kazerne; Attendance: 13,944; Referee: Brent Staessens

10 September 2022 8	Kortrijk	1–4	Mechelen	Kortrijk
16:00 CEST (UTC+2)	Vandendriessche (yellow card) 30'; Lamkel Zé 63'; Silva (yellow card) 70'; D'Haene (yellow card) 83'	Report	Hairemans (yellow card) 24', (goal) 53'; Walsh 37'; Schoofs 41', 90+3'; Vanlerberghe (yellow card) 61'; Da Cruz (yellow card) 68'; Malede (yellow card) 88'; Ngoy (yellow card) 90'	Stadium: Guldensporenstadion; Attendance: 4,402; Referee: Nicolas Laforge

17 September 2022 9	Mechelen	0–0	OH Leuven	Mechelen
16:00 CEST (UTC+2)	Da Cruz (red card) 44'; Soelle (yellow card) 90'; Bolingoli-Mbombo (yellow card) 90+2'	Report	Maertens (yellow card) 70'; Dom (yellow card) 87'	Stadium: Achter de Kazerne; Attendance: 10,663; Referee: Bert Put

1 October 2022 10	Club Brugge	3–0	Mechelen	Bruges
20:45 CEST (UTC+2)	Jutglà 37'; Sobol 53'; Buchanan 86'	Report		Stadium: Jan Breydelstadion; Attendance: 20,076; Referee: Kevin Van Damme

9 October 2022 11	Mechelen	1–3	Anderlecht	Mechelen
13:30 CEST (UTC+2)	Vanlerberghe 15'; Soelle (yellow card) 90+1'	Report	Diawara (yellow card) 9'; Refaelov 31'; Stroeykens 46', 67', (yellow card) 79'; Silva 71'; Van Crombrugge (yellow card) 84'	Stadium: Achter de Kazerne; Attendance: 16,125; Referee: Bram Van Driessche

16 October 2022 12	Gent	3–0	Mechelen	Ghent
16:00 CEST (UTC+2)	Samoise 35'; Owusu (yellow card) 45'; Fortuna 64'; Odjidja-Ofoe 72'	Report	Bolingoli-Mbombo (yellow card) 40'; Da Cruz (yellow card) 47'; Walsh (yellow card) 48'; Verstraete (red card) 49'	Stadium: Ghelamco Arena; Attendance: 17,000; Referee: Jan Boterberg

19 October 2022 13	Mechelen	2–0	Standard	Mechelen
20:45 CEST (UTC+2)	Verstraete (yellow card) 32'; Vanlerberghe 71'; Ngoy 74'	Report	Alzate (yellow card) 49'; Zinckernagel (yellow card) 79'	Stadium: Achter de Kazerne; Attendance: 10,890; Referee: Jasper Vergoote

22 October 2022 14	Mechelen	2–1	Eupen	Mechelen
18:15 CEST (UTC+2)	Da Cruz 22'; Bates (yellow card) 49' (yellow-red card) 63'; Ngoy 76'; Schoofs (yellow card) 90+5'	Report	N'Dri 16', (yellow card) 78'; Lambert (yellow card) 40'; Jeggo (yellow card) 75'; Wakaso (yellow card) 80'	Stadium: Achter de Kazerne; Attendance: 11,225; Referee: Jonathan Lardot

28 October 2022 15	Genk	3–1	Mechelen	Genk
20:45 CEST (UTC+2)	Muñoz 9'; Arteaga 57'; El Khannous (yellow card) 59' (yellow-red card) 64'; Paintsil 90+1'	Report	Schoofs 15'; Bolingoli-Mbombo (yellow card) 25'; Wouters (yellow card) 74'	Stadium: Cegeka Arena; Attendance: 19,248; Referee: Nathan Verboomen

5 November 2022 16	Mechelen	2–2	Zulte Waregem	Mechelen
16:00 CEST (UTC+2)	Verstraete 16'; Dismas 41' (o.g.); Van Hecke (yellow card) 80'	Report	Offor (yellow card) 36'; Sissako (yellow card) 44' (yellow-red card) 75'; Sangaré 54'; Vossen 62'; Rommens (yellow card) 66'	Stadium: Achter de Kazerne; Attendance: 12,325; Referee: Kevin Van Damme

12 November 2022 17	Charleroi	0–5	Mechelen	Charleroi
20:45 CEST (UTC+2)	Ilaimaharitra (yellow card) 37'; Benbouali 52'	Report	Walsh (yellow card) 45'	Stadium: Stade du Pays de Charleroi; Referee: Jan Boterberg
Note: The match was stopped at the 67th minute while Charleroi led 1–0, due to Charleroi supporters throwing pyrotechnics on to the pitch. On 23 November 2022, Charleroi was penalized with a fine of €75,000 and a threat of three matches behind closed doors. A few months later following appeals, the Belgian Court of Arbitration for Sport ruled a forfeit victory for Mechelen.

23 December 2022 18	Mechelen	1–1	Cercle Brugge	Mechelen
20:30 CEST (UTC+2)	Bates (yellow card) 19'; Verstraete (yellow card) 47'; Storm 71'; Mrabti (yellow card) 73'	Report	Denkey 3'; Deman (yellow card) 32' (yellow-red card) 52'; Daland (yellow card) 74'; Vanhoutte (yellow card) 83'	Stadium: Achter de Kazerne; Attendance: 10,344; Referee: Brent Staessens

8 January 2023 19	Zulte Waregem	2–0	Mechelen	Waregem
16:00 CEST (UTC+2)	Rommens 5'; Derijck (yellow card) 23'; Gano 73'; Ciranni (yellow card) 90+4'	Report	Van Hoorenbeeck (yellow card) 4'; Walsh (yellow card) 59'; Lavalée (yellow card) 68'; Verstraete (yellow card) 77'; Bates (yellow card) 84'; Schoofs (yellow card) 88'	Stadium: Elindus Arena; Attendance: 6,985; Referee: Bert Put

14 January 2023 20	Mechelen	2–1	Oostende	Mechelen
18:15 CEST (UTC+2)	Da Cruz 40'; Bates (yellow card) 50', (goal) 70'	Report	Rodin (yellow card) 30'; Bätzner 63'; Awokoya-Mebude (red card) 76'	Stadium: Achter de Kazerne; Attendance: 10,341; Referee: Jan Boterberg

17 January 2023 21	Standard	2–0	Mechelen	Liège
20:45 CEST (UTC+2)	Laifis 45+1'; Cimirot (yellow card) 60'; Davida (yellow card) 78'; Ohio 85'	Report		Stadium: Stade Maurice Dufrasne; Attendance: 12,226; Referee: Jonathan Lardot

21 January 2023 22	Mechelen	3–2	Kortrijk	Mechelen
18:15 CEST (UTC+2)	Storm 37'; Mrabti 48'; Ngoy 73'; Van Hecke (yellow card) 89'; Bolingoli-Mbombo (yellow card) 90+3'	Report	Silva (yellow card) 17'; De Neve 33'; Wasinski (yellow card) 46'; Kadri 57'; Lončar (yellow card) 68'; Guèye (yellow card) 87'	Stadium: Achter de Kazerne; Attendance: 10,889; Referee: Arthur Denil

28 January 2023 23	Westerlo	2–0	Mechelen	Westerlo
16:00 CEST (UTC+2)	Vaesen 22', 56'; Madsen (yellow card) 53'	Report	Verstraete (yellow card) 52'; Lavalée (yellow card) 68' (yellow-red card) 77'	Stadium: Het Kuipje; Attendance: 5,927; Referee: Brent Staessens

5 February 2023 24	Mechelen	2–2	Charleroi	Mechelen
16:00 CEST (UTC+2)	Storm 5'; Hairemans 27'; Schoofs (red card) 40'	Report	Štulić (yellow card) 54'; Zorgane 66', 67', (yellow card) 83'; Kayembe (yellow card) 90+4'	Stadium: Achter de Kazerne; Attendance: 10,980; Referee: Nicolas Laforge

=== Belgian Cup ===
9 November 2022 Sixth round	Lokeren-Temse	0–5	Mechelen	Lokeren
22:00 CEST (UTC+2)		Report	Schoofs 21'; Malede 44', 52'; Da Cruz 71'; Van Hoorenbeeck 88'	Stadium: Daknamstadion; Referee: Anthony Letellier

20 December 2022 Seventh round	Mechelen	1–0	Seraing	Mechelen
22:00 CEST (UTC+2)	Mrabti 57'	Report		Stadium: Achter de Kazerne; Referee: Alexandre Boucaut

11 January 2023 Quarter-finals	Kortrijk	0–1	Mechelen	Kortrijk
18:30 CEST (UTC+2)		Report	Walsh 90+1'	Stadium: Guldensporen Stadion; Referee: Jasper Vergoote

2 February 2023 Semi-finals 1st leg	Zulte Waregem	1–2	Mechelen	Waregem
20:45 CET	Fadera 2'	Report	Storm 25'; Mrabti 51'	Stadium: Elindus Arena; Referee: Jan Boterberg

28 February 2023 Semi-finals 2nd leg	Mechelen	1–0	Zulte Waregem	Mechelen
20:45 CET	David Bates 76'	Report		Stadium: Achter de Kazerne; Referee: Bram Van Driessche
