= 2020–21 KV Mechelen season =

K.V. Mechelen
2020–21 season
- Manager: Wouter Vrancken
- Stadium: Achter de Kazerne
- Belgian First Division A: 8th
- Belgian Cup: Quarter-finals
- Top goalscorer: League: Igor de Camargo; Geoffry Hairemans (8 each); All: Igor de Camargo; Geoffry Hairemans (8 each)
Home colours	Away colours	Third colours

The 2020–21 K.V. Mechelen season was the club's 117th season in existence and its second consecutive season in the top flight of Belgian football. In addition to the domestic league, KV Mechelen participated in this season's edition of the Belgian Cup. The season covered the period from 1 July 2020 to 30 June 2021.

== Players ==
=== First-team squad ===
As of 16 February 2021

Note: Flags indicate national team as defined under FIFA eligibility rules; some limited exceptions apply. Players may hold more than one non-FIFA nationality.

No.	Pos.	Nation	Player
1	GK	BEL	Gaëtan Coucke
3	DF	NED	Lucas Bijker
4	DF	TTO	Sheldon Bateau
5	DF	NED	Sandy Walsh
7	MF	BEL	Geoffry Hairemans
8	MF	BEL	Onur Kaya (captain)
9	FW	NED	Ferdy Druijf (on loan from AZ)
10	FW	BEL	Igor de Camargo
11	FW	BEL	Nikola Storm
12	GK	BEL	Sofiane Bouzian
13	MF	BEL	Joachim Van Damme
14	DF	BEL	Siemen Voet (on loan from Club Brugge)
15	GK	BEL	Yannick Thoelen

No.	Pos.	Nation	Player
16	MF	BEL	Rob Schoofs
17	MF	BFA	Trova Boni
19	FW	SWE	Kerim Mrabti
20	FW	SWE	Gustav Engvall
21	FW	BEL	Niklo Dailly
23	DF	FRA	Thibault Peyre
26	DF	SWE	Victor Wernersson
29	DF	BFA	Issa Kaboré (on loan from Manchester City)
30	DF	BEL	Jordi Vanlerberghe (on loan from Club Brugge)
32	GK	BEL	Maxime Wenssens
35	FW	UKR	Marian Shved (on loan from Celtic)
40	MF	BEL	Aster Vranckx
88	MF	BEL	Steven Defour

=== Out on loan ===
Note: Flags indicate national team as defined under FIFA eligibility rules; some limited exceptions apply. Players may hold more than one non-FIFA nationality.

No.	Pos.	Nation	Player
19	DF	BEL	Alec Van Hoorenbeeck (on loan at Helmond)
27	FW	CIV	William Togui (on loan at Espérance Tunis)
33	MF	BEL	Gaétan Bosiers (on loan at Helmond)
—	DF	BEL	Maxime De Bie (on loan at Helmond)
—	MF	BEL	Arno Van Keilegom (on loan at Helmond)

== Pre-season and friendlies ==
Win Draw Loss

11 July 2020 Friendly	Club Brugge (Belgium)	6–0	(Belgium) Mechelen	Knokke-Heist, Belgium
18:00 CEST (UTC+2)				Stadium: Complex Molenhoek

18 July 2020 Friendly	Mechelen (Belgium)	0–6	(Belgium) Westerlo	Kampenhout, Belgium
10:30 CEST (UTC+2)				Stadium: Sportcentrum De Zeype

18 July 2020 Friendly	Standard Liège (Belgium)	4–0	(Belgium) Mechelen	Boncelles, Belgium
18:00 CEST (UTC+2)				Stadium: Académie Robert Louis-Dreyfus

25 July 2020 Friendly	OH Leuven (Belgium)	3–0	(Belgium) Mechelen	Leuven, Belgium
19:00 CEST (UTC+2)				Stadium: King Power Stadion

29 July 2020 Friendly	Mechelen (Belgium)	Cancelled	(Netherlands) Jong FC Utrecht	Mechelen, Belgium
14:00 CEST (UTC+2)				Stadium: Achter de Kazerne

1 August 2020 Friendly	Metz (France)	1–0	(Belgium) Mechelen	Metz, France
10:30 CEST (UTC+2)	Boulaya 29'			Stadium: Stade Saint-Symphorien

== Competitions ==
=== Overview ===
Competition	First match	Last match	Starting round	Final position	Record							
Competition	First match	Last match	Starting round	Final position	Pld	W	D	L	GF	GA	GD	Win %
Belgian First Division A	9 August 2020	22 May 2021	Matchday 1	8th	40	16	11	13	69	65	+4	40.00
Belgian Cup	3 February 2021	4 March 2021	Sixth round	Quarter-finals	3	2	0	1	4	4	+0	66.67
Total					43	18	11	14	73	69	+4	41.86

Source: Soccerway

=== Belgian First Division A ===
==== Regular season ====
Pos	Team	Pld	W	D	L	GF	GA	GD	Pts	Qualification or relegation
6	Standard Liège	34	13	11	10	52	41	+11	50	Qualification for the Play-offs II
7	Gent	34	14	7	13	55	42	+13	49	Qualification for the Play-offs II
8	Mechelen	34	13	9	12	54	54	0	48	Qualification for the Play-offs II
9	Beerschot	34	14	5	15	58	64	−6	47	
10	Zulte Waregem	34	14	4	16	53	69	−16	46	

Source: Jupiler Pro League (in Dutch), Soccerway
Rules for classification: 1) Points; 2) Matches won; 3) Goal difference; 4) Goals scored; 5) Away matches won; 6) Away goal difference; 7) Away goals scored; 8) Play-off.

==== Results summary ====
Overall								Home						Away					
Pld	W	D	L	GF	GA	GD	Pts	W	D	L	GF	GA	GD	W	D	L	GF	GA	GD
34	13	9	12	54	54	0	48	5	5	7	29	30	−1	8	4	5	25	24	+1

Source: Jupiler Pro League

==== Results by round ====
Round	1	2	3	4	5	6	7	8	9	10	11	12	13	14	15	16	17	18	19	20	21	22	23	24	25	26	27	28	29	30	31	32	33	34
Ground	H	A	H	A	H	A	H	A	H	A	A	H	A	H	A	H	H	A	H	H	A	H	H	A	H	A	A	H	A	A	H	A	H	A
Result	D	W	L	L	L	L	W	L	L	D	D	D	W	L	D	L	L	W	W	W	W	L	W	W	D	W	W	D	L	D	D	L	W	W
Position	8	6	7	12	15	16	13	14	15	15	15	15	14	15	16	16	16	16	14	13	13	15	13	11	10	10	8	9	9	9	10	12	10	8

Source: Jupiler Pro League
A = Away; H = Home; W = Win; D = Draw; L = Loss

==== Matches ====
The league fixtures were announced on 8 July 2020.

9 August 2020 1	Mechelen	2–2	Anderlecht	Mechelen
18:15 CEST (UTC+2)	Van Damme (yellow card) 30'; Kaboré (yellow card) 42'; Vranckx (yellow card) 70'; De Camargo 83'; Vanlerberghe 85'	Report	Luckassen (yellow card) 44'; Vlap (yellow card) 53'; Doku 64'; Bushiri 75' (o.g.); Colassin (yellow card) 88'	Stadium: Achter de Kazerne; Referee: Alexandre Boucaut

14 August 2020 2	Excel Mouscron	0–1	Mechelen	Mouscron
19:00 CEST (UTC+2)	Antonov (yellow card) 8'; Koffi (yellow card) 8'; Bakić (yellow card) 48'	Report	Storm 9' (pen.); Van Damme (yellow card) 47'; Bushiri (yellow card) 48'; Coucke (yellow card) 86'	Stadium: Stade Le Canonnier; Attendance: 0 Referee: Christof Dierick

22 August 2020 3	Mechelen	2–3	Cercle Brugge	Mechelen
18:30 CEST (UTC+2)	Togui 37'; Vranckx 64', (yellow card) 72'; De Camargo (yellow card) 82'; Kaya (yellow card) 88'; Bijker (yellow card) 90+5'	Report	Omolo (yellow card) 29'; Ugbo 54'; Hotić 57'; Taravel (yellow card) 76'; Somers 80'	Stadium: Achter de Kazerne; Attendance: 0 Referee: Kevin Van Damme

30 August 2020 4	Gent	1–0	Mechelen	Ghent
20:45 CEST (UTC+2)	Niangbo 36'; Chakvetadze (yellow card) 56'; Castro-Montes (yellow card) 90+4'	Report	Schoofs (yellow card) 59'	Stadium: Ghelamco Arena; Attendance: 0 Referee: Lawrence Visser

12 September 2020 5	Mechelen	0–1	Oostende	Mechelen
16:15 CEST (UTC+2)	Van Damme (yellow card) 52'; Kaboré (yellow card) 61'; Bijker (yellow card) 75'; Hairemans (yellow card) 83'; Vanlerberghe (yellow card) 89'	Report	D'Arpino (yellow card) 82'; Vandendriessche (yellow card) 90'; Hendry 90+5'	Stadium: Achter de Kazerne; Referee: Lothar D'Hondt

20 September 2020 6	Genk	3–1	Mechelen	Genk
18:15 CEST (UTC+2)	Onuachu 10', 68'; Ito 55'	Report	Mrabti 6'; Van Damme (yellow card) 45+1'	Stadium: Luminus Arena; Referee: Alexandre Boucaut

26 September 2020 7	Mechelen	2–0	Sint-Truiden	Mechelen
18:30 CEST (UTC+2)	Van Damme (yellow card) 23'; Vranckx 60', 64', (yellow card) 68'; Peyre (yellow card) 90+1'	Report	Colidio (yellow card) 12'; Lee (yellow card) 23'; Suzuki (yellow card) 43'; Durkin (yellow card) 45+1'; Konaté (yellow card) 65'; Sankhon (yellow card) 74'	Stadium: Achter de Kazerne; Referee: Nathan Verboomen

2 October 2020 8	Antwerp	4–1	Mechelen	Antwerp
20:45 CEST (UTC+2)	Bushiri 5' (o.g.); Miyoshi 8'; Mbokani 43'; Hongla (yellow card) 57'; Seck 78'	Report	Bushiri (yellow card) 62'; Hairemans 67'; Bijker (yellow card) 76'	Stadium: Bosuilstadion; Attendance: 3,900; Referee: Nicolas Laforge

17 October 2020 9	Mechelen	1–2	Kortrijk	Mechelen
18:30 CEST (UTC+2)	Voet 53'	Report	Jonckheere 71'; Makarenko 74'	Stadium: Achter de Kazerne; Attendance: 5,160; Referee: Lawrence Visser

31 October 2020 11	Club Brugge	2–2	Mechelen	Bruges
20:45 CET (UTC+1)	Vormer 13', (yellow card) 20'; Lang 28'	Report	De Camargo 42'; Schoofs 81'	Stadium: Jan Breydel Stadium; Attendance: 0 Referee: Jonathan Lardot

6 November 2020 12	Mechelen	3–3	Charleroi	Mechelen
20:45 CET (UTC+1)	Hairemans 9'; De Camargo 32'; Voet (yellow card) 58'; Defour (yellow card) 61'; Van Damme 83'	Report	Fall (yellow card) 8'; Rezaei 20'; Vanlerberghe 57' (o.g.); Ilaimaharitra (yellow card) 68'; Gholizadeh 72'; Willems (yellow card) 82'	Stadium: Achter de Kazerne; Attendance: 0 Referee: Bert Put

22 November 2020 13	Zulte Waregem	1–2	Mechelen	Waregem
16:00 CET (UTC+1)	Bruno 54'	Report	Storm 40'; Hairemans 48'; Van Damme (yellow card) 86'; Kaya (yellow card) 87'	Stadium: Regenboogstadion; Attendance: 0 Referee: Christof Dierick

29 November 2020 14	Mechelen	2–3	Beerschot	Mechelen
13:30 CET (UTC+1)	Frans 21' (o.g.); Vanlerberghe (yellow card) 39'; Mboko 44' (o.g.); Vranckx (red card) 60'; Storm (yellow card) 67'; Hairemans (yellow card) 68'; Schoofs (yellow card) 74'	Report	Tissoudali 13'; Coulibaly (yellow card) 18', (goal) 80'; Pietermaat (yellow card) 42'; Van den Bergh 69'	Stadium: Achter de Kazerne; Attendance: 0 Referee: Lawrence Visser

3 December 2020 10	Eupen	1–1	Mechelen	Eupen
17:00 CET (UTC+1)	Ngoy 20'	Report	Vanlerberghe (yellow card) 78'; Van Damme (yellow card) 88'; Schoofs 90+2'	Stadium: Kehrwegstadion; Attendance: 0 Referee: Jasper Vergoote

6 December 2020 15	Standard Liège	2–2	Mechelen	Liège
18:15 CET (UTC+1)	Laifis 45'; Fai (yellow card) 73'; Balikwisha 78'; Dussenne (yellow card) 90'	Report	Van Damme 63' (pen.); Walsh 88'; Mrabti (yellow card) 90+6'	Stadium: Stade Maurice Dufrasne; Attendance: 0 Referee: Erik Lambrechts

13 December 2020 16	Mechelen	2–3	Waasland-Beveren	Mechelen
20:45 CET (UTC+1)	Hairemans 27'; Voet (red card) 36'; Mrabti 60'	Report	Heymans 47'; Koita 49'; Bertone 67'	Stadium: Achter de Kazerne; Attendance: 0 Referee: Alexandre Boucaut

17 December 2020 17	Mechelen	0–3	Club Brugge	Mechelen
20:45 CET (UTC+1)	Peyre (yellow card) 41'; Storm (yellow card) 45'; Bushiri (yellow card) 63'	Report	Diatta 69', 74'; Okereke 89'	Stadium: Achter de Kazerne; Attendance: 0 Referee: Jonathan Lardot

20 December 2020 18	OH Leuven	1–2	Mechelen	Leuven
16:00 CET (UTC+1)	Vlietinck (yellow card) 43'; De Norre (yellow card) 54'; Henry 61', (yellow card) 90+3'	Report	Vranckx (yellow card) 8'; Mrabti 27'; Hubert 31' (o.g.); Hairemans (yellow card) 83'; Walsh (yellow card) 90+2'; Engvall (yellow card) 90+3'	Stadium: Den Dreef; Attendance: 0 Referee: Jan Boterberg

27 December 2020 19	Mechelen	2–1	Excel Mouscron	Mechelen
20:45 CET (UTC+1)	Mrabti 38'; Shved 83'	Report	Mohamed 69' (pen.)	Stadium: Achter de Kazerne; Attendance: 0 Referee: Jasper Vergoote

10 January 2021 30	Mechelen	3–0	Antwerp	Mechelen
13:30 CET (UTC+1)	Schoofs 59'; Engvall (yellow card) 62'; Hairemans 63', 67'	Report	Batubinsika (yellow card) 42'; Buta (yellow card) 45+1'; Haroun (yellow card) 90+1'	Stadium: Achter de Kazerne; Attendance: 0 Referee: Erik Lambrechts

16 January 2021 20	Charleroi	0–1	Mechelen	Charleroi
20:45 CET (UTC+1)	Nicholson (yellow card) 46'	Report	Schoofs (yellow card) 30'; Hairemans 59'	Stadium: Stade du Pays de Charleroi; Attendance: 0 Referee: Nicolas Laforge

20 January 2021 21	Mechelen	0–4	Standard Liège	Mechelen
18:45 CET (UTC+1)	De Camargo (yellow card) 77'	Report	Dussenne 22'; Amallah 49'; Pavlovic (yellow card) 51'; Bastien 54'; Balikwisha 57'	Stadium: Achter de Kazerne; Attendance: 0 Referee: Kevin Van Damme

23 January 2021 22	Mechelen	3–0	Eupen	Mechelen
16:15 CET (UTC+1)	Hairemans 26'; Mrabti 47'; De Camargo 74'	Report		Stadium: Achter de Kazerne; Attendance: 0 Referee: Wesli De Cremer

26 January 2021 23	Waasland-Beveren	2–3	Mechelen	Beveren
18:45 CET (UTC+1)	Mandjeck (yellow card) 29'; Faucher 60', 70'; Sinani (yellow card) 77'	Report	Walsh 8'; Shved 26', 90+2'; De Camargo (yellow card) 63'	Stadium: Freethiel Stadion; Attendance: 0 Referee: Jasper Vergoote

30 January 2021 24	Mechelen	0–0	Genk	Mechelen
16:15 CET (UTC+1)	Bijker (yellow card) 5'; Van Damme (yellow card) 56'	Report	Preciado (yellow card) 9'; Thorstvedt (yellow card) 51'; Heynen (yellow card) 90+1'	Stadium: Achter de Kazerne; Attendance: 0 Referee: Christof Dierick

6 February 2021 25	Cercle Brugge	0–1	Mechelen	Bruges
18:30 CET (UTC+1)	Somers (yellow card) 73'; Van der Bruggen (yellow card) 77'	Report	Druijf (yellow card) 85'; De Camargo 87'	Stadium: Jan Breydel Stadium; Attendance: 0 Referee: Jan Boterberg

14 February 2021 26	Beerschot	1–2	Mechelen	Antwerp
16:00 CET (UTC+1)	Radić (yellow card) 34'; Holzhauser 52' (pen.); Brogno (yellow card) 81'	Report	Walsh 90'; Druijf 90+4'	Stadium: Olympisch Stadion; Attendance: 0 Referee: Nathan Verboomen

19 February 2021 27	Mechelen	1–1	Gent	Mechelen
20:45 CET (UTC+1)	Storm 16'; Vanlerberghe (yellow card) 56'	Report	Yaremchuk 10'; Castro-Montes (yellow card) 81'	Stadium: Achter de Kazerne; Attendance: 0 Referee: Alexandre Boucaut

27 February 2021 28	Oostende	2–0	Mechelen	Ostend
18:30 CET (UTC+1)	D'Arpino (yellow card) 15'; Gueye 27' (pen.); Tanghe (yellow card) 28'; Capon 86'	Report	Hairemans (yellow card) 17'; Bateau (yellow card) 26'; Vanlerberghe (yellow card) 88'	Stadium: Diaz Arena; Attendance: 0 Referee: Bert Put

7 March 2021 29	Anderlecht	1–1	Mechelen	Anderlecht
18:15 CET (UTC+1)	Nmecha 43' (pen.)	Report	De Camargo 66' (pen.); Walsh (yellow card) 84'	Stadium: Constant Vanden Stock Stadium; Attendance: 0 Referee: Lothar D'hondt

21 March 2021 31	Mechelen	2–2	OH Leuven	Mechelen
16:00 CET (UTC+1)	Defour (yellow card) 28'; Vranckx 30'; Schoofs (yellow card) 53'; Druijf 80' (pen.); Bijker (yellow card) 90+5'	Report	De Norre (yellow card) 36', (goal) 40'; Schrijvers 70'	Stadium: Achter de Kazerne; Attendance: 0 Referee: Jasper Vergoote

3 April 2021 32	Sint-Truiden	2–1	Mechelen	Sint-Truiden
18:30 CEST (UTC+2)	Suzuki 11'; Mboyo 42' (pen.)	Report	Walsh (yellow card) 41'; Kaboré (yellow card) 65'; De Camargo 90'	Stadium: Stayen; Attendance: 0 Referee: Kevin Van Damme

10 April 2021 33	Mechelen	4–2	Zulte Waregem	Mechelen
18:30 CEST (UTC+2)	Storm 30', 33'; Druijf (yellow card) 44', (goal) 66'; Bijker (yellow card) 72'; De Camargo 80'; Kaboré (yellow card) 90+2'	Report	Bruno 64', 78', (penalty missed) 90+4'	Stadium: Achter de Kazerne; Attendance: 0 Referee: Bert Put

18 April 2021 34	Kortrijk	1–4	Mechelen	Kortrijk
18:00 CEST (UTC+2)	Selemani 10' (pen.); Jonckheere (yellow card) 74'	Report	Defour (yellow card) 14'; Mrabti 28' (pen.); Storm 35', 46'; Schoofs 82'	Stadium: Guldensporen Stadion; Attendance: 0 Referee: Wim Smet

==== Play-Off II ====
Pos	Team	Pld	W	D	L	GF	GA	GD	Pts	Qualification or relegation	GNT	MEC	OOS	STA
1	Gent	6	4	1	1	13	6	+7	38	Qualification for the Europa Conference League second qualifying round	—	2–2	2–1	2–0
2	Mechelen	6	3	2	1	15	11	+4	35		1–2	—	5–3	3–1
3	Oostende	6	2	1	3	15	16	−1	34		0–4	2–2	—	6–2
4	Standard Liège	6	1	0	5	7	17	−10	28		2–1	1–2	1–3	—

Source: Jupiler Pro League (in Dutch), Soccerway
Legend: Blue = home team win; Yellow = draw; Red = away team win.
Rules for classification: 1) Points; 2) Points without (possible) half points added due to rounding; 3) Regular season finishing position.

==== Results summary ====
Overall								Home						Away					
Pld	W	D	L	GF	GA	GD	Pts	W	D	L	GF	GA	GD	W	D	L	GF	GA	GD
6	3	2	1	15	11	+4	11	2	0	1	9	6	+3	1	2	0	6	5	+1

Source: Jupiler Pro League

==== Results by round ====
Round	1	2	3	4	5	6
Ground	A	H	A	H	A	H
Result	D	W	W	W	D	L
Position	4	3	1	1	1	2

Source: Jupiler Pro League
A = Away; H = Home; W = Win; D = Draw; L = Loss

==== Matches ====
2 May 2021 1	Gent	2–2	Mechelen	Ghent
16:00 CEST (UTC+2)	Owusu (yellow card) 7'; Yaremchuk 46'; Odjidja-Ofoe 49'	Report	Storm 29'; Druijf 32'; Schoofs (yellow card) 39'	Stadium: Ghelamco Arena; Attendance: 0 Referee: Nathan Verboomen

9 May 2021 2	Mechelen	5–3	Oostende	Mechelen
16:00 CEST (UTC+2)	Vranckx (yellow card) 16'; Storm 34', 66', (yellow card) 63'; Mrabti 38'; Vanlerberghe 84'; De Camargo 90+2'	Report	Sakala 14'; Bataille (yellow card) 17'; Theate 30', (yellow card) 55'; Hjulsager 81'	Stadium: Achter de Kazerne; Attendance: 0 Referee: Bram Van Driessche

13 May 2021 3	Standard Liège	1–2	Mechelen	Liège
16:00 CEST (UTC+2)	Amallah (yellow card) 36'; Raskin 68'	Report	Gavory 14' (o.g.); Storm 54'; Peyre (red card) 69'; Walsh (yellow card) 73'; Bijker (yellow card) 84'	Stadium: Stade Maurice Dufrasne; Attendance: 0 Referee: Kevin Van Damme

16 May 2021 4	Mechelen	3–1	Standard Liège	Mechelen
16:00 CEST (UTC+2)	Schoofs 13', 71'; Shved 57'; Vanlerberghe (yellow card) 70'	Report	Delferrière (yellow card) 5'; Sissako (yellow card) 35'; Bastien (yellow card) 82'; Muleka 89'	Stadium: Achter de Kazerne; Attendance: 0 Referee: Bert Put

19 May 2021 5	Oostende	2–2	Mechelen	Ostend
18:30 CEST (UTC+2)	Sakala 5', 20'; Jäkel (yellow card) 42'; Hubert (yellow card) 51'; Vandendriessche (yellow card) 69'	Report	Vranckx (yellow card) 40' (yellow-red card) 81'; Druijf 47'; Bateau 63'	Stadium: Diaz Arena; Attendance: 0 Referee: Nathan Verboomen

22 May 2021 6	Mechelen	1–2	Gent	Mechelen
20:00 CEST (UTC+2)	Mrabti (yellow card) 53'; Druijf 72' (pen.); Engvall (yellow card) 85'; Schoofs (yellow card) 88'; Bateau (yellow card) 90+2'	Report	Bezus (yellow card) 51', (goal) 57'; Tissoudali 67', (yellow card) 90+2'; Godeau (yellow card) 85'; Bolat (yellow card) 90+1'; Kums (yellow card) 90+5'; Emeka (yellow card) 90+5'	Stadium: Achter de Kazerne; Attendance: 0 Referee: Bram van Driessche

=== Belgian Cup ===
3 February 2021 Sixth round	Mechelen	2–0	RWDM	Mechelen
16:00 CET (UTC+1)	Druijf 28'; Shved 65'	Report		Stadium: Achter de Kazerne; Attendance: 0

11 February 2021 Seventh round	Beerschot	0–1	Mechelen	Antwerp
18:00 CET (UTC+1)	Van den Bergh (yellow card) 21'; Prychynenko (yellow card) 54'	Report	Schoofs 41'; Kaya (yellow card) 86'; Kaboré (yellow card) 89'	Stadium: Olympic Stadium; Attendance: 0 Referee: Kevin Van Damme

4 March 2021 Quarter-finals	Genk	4–1	Mechelen	Genk
18:00 CET (UTC+1)	Thorstvedt 2', 64'; Muñoz 10'; Bongonda 85'	Report	Mrabti 82'; Vranckx (yellow card) 87'	Stadium: Luminus Arena; Attendance: 0 Referee: Nicolas Laforge
