= 2023 Belgian Cup final =

- Event: 2022–23 Belgian Cup
KV Mechelen	Antwerp
0	2
- Date: 30 April 2023
- Venue: King Baudouin Stadium, Brussels
- Referee: Jonathan Lardot
- Attendance: 41,500
- Weather: sunny

The 2023 Belgian Cup final, named Croky Cup after the sponsor, was the 68th Belgian Cup final which took place on 30 April 2023. The match was contested by KV Mechelen and Antwerp.

Mechelen had qualified for its seventh Belgian Cup Final on 28 February 2023, and already won the tournament twice, first in 1987 and more recently in 2019. Two days later, Antwerp qualified as well, making this their fifth appearance in the final, having already won the cup three times, most notably in 1992 when they also met KV Mechelen and a penalty shoot-out ended in their favor.

Antwerp won the match 2–0.

== Route to the final ==
Mechelen					Antwerp
Opponent	Result	Legs	Scorers	Round	Opponent	Result	Legs	Scorers
Lokeren-Temse (IV)	5–0	5–0 away	Schoofs, Malede (2), Da Cruz, Van Hoorenbeeck	Sixth round	Beveren (II)	2–2	2–2 away (a.e.t.) (4–2 p)	Stengs, Tshimanga (o.g.)
Seraing (I)	1–0	1–0 home	Mrabti	Seventh round	Standard Liège (I)	4–0	4–0 home	Bataille, Frey, Muja, Stengs
Kortrijk (I)	1–0	1–0 away	Walsh	Quarter-finals	Genk (I)	3–0	3–0 away	Janssen, De Laet, Balikwisha
Zulte Waregem (I)	3–1	2–1 away; 1–0 home	Storm, Mrabti; Bates	Semi-finals	Union SG (I)	1–1	0–1 away; 1–0 home (a.e.t.) (4–3 p)	none; Janssen

== Pre-match ==
Going into the match, Antwerp were deemed (slight) favorites based on their season thus far. Already certain of qualifying for the 2022–23 Belgian Pro League Championship Play-offs several weeks before the match, Antwerp was quasi-certain of qualifying for European football during the 2023–24 season. Towards the final matchdays of the regular season, however, the club had edged closer to the top of the table as league leaders Genk started dropping points and as a result, Antwerp would start the Championship Play-offs, to commence a week after the final, just two points off the lead. This momentum on the one hand could give the team extra energy for the Cup final, while on the other hand losing it would put extra pressure on them to obtain the title, which would be their first since 1957.

Meanwhile, while on the road to the final Antwerp had beaten bigger teams (leaders Genk, second-place Union SG as well as Standard Liège), Mechelen had seemingly taken the easier route via teams all finishing in the bottom five of the table, with Seraing and Zulte Waregem even relegated. Furthermore, the team itself had played a dull season, never in real danger of relegation but always in the bottom half of the table. Especially from the moment the team qualified for the final, their league performance dropped with many players seemingly not willing to risk long-term injuries. On the final matchday of the regular season, Mechelen did beat Anderlecht away from home, their first win since early March. As they finished 13th, for Mechelen the league was done for the season, meaning the Cup final would be their last match before the summer break.

The winner of the match will qualify for the 2023–24 UEFA Europa League Play-off round. If Antwerp were to win but also finish in the top two of the league, they would instead qualify for the qualifying rounds of the 2023–24 UEFA Champions League, with the ticket for the 2023–24 UEFA Europa League Play-off round, in that case, being passed along to the third-place finisher in the league.

== Match ==
=== Summary ===
For the first half hour the Antwerp Province derby was a dull match to watch, with a lot of atmosphere in the stands and at the sidelines, but no entertainment on the pitch. This changed when Mechelen defender Dries Wouters made an unfortunate error in the penalty area, fouling Jurgen Ekkelenkamp and causing referee Jonathan Lardot to immediately award a penalty kick to Antwerp. Vincent Janssen scored twice past Gaëtan Coucke, after the first penalty kick was disallowed as he had kicked the ball prior to the referee blowing his whistle to indicate it could be taken. Mechelen responded immediately, with both Nikola Storm and Rob Schoofs getting opportunities to shoot, none without any real danger.

After the break, the level went up strongly for a short period of time as Antwerp received multiple chances to double its lead. Ekkelenkamp shot wide after preparatory work by Arbnor Muja, while Janssen aimed a shot straight at Coucke. Several substitutions as well as injury treatments to Willian Pacho and Janssen caused the pace of the match to slow considerably and it took until ten minutes from time for the match to be decided, when Michel-Ange Balikwisha started a counterattack which he in the end converted himself on an assist from Calvin Stengs. Mechelen was not able to respond and became the logical runner-up in a match without many chances.

=== Details ===
30 April 2023
14:30 CEST

KV Mechelen	0–2	Antwerp
	Report	Janssen 35' (pen.); Balikwisha 81'

King Baudouin Stadium, Brussels
Attendance: 41,500
Referee: Jonathan Lardot

KV Mechelen	Antwerp

GK	1	(Belgium) Gaëtan Coucke
CB	4	(Belgium) Dries Wouters
CB	30	(Belgium) Jordi Vanlerberghe
CB	27	(Scotland) David Bates		(substituted off) 84'
RWB	5	(Indonesia) Sandy Walsh
LWB	18	(Belgium) Alec Van Hoorenbeeck		(substituted off) 63'
CM	16	(Belgium) Rob Schoofs
CM	7	(Belgium) Geoffry Hairemans
CM	14	(Belgium) Dimitri Lavalée	(yellow card) 43'	(substituted off) 46'
CF	19	(Sweden) Kerim Mrabti		(substituted off) 75'
CF	11	(Belgium) Nikola Storm
Substitutes:
GK	15	(Belgium) Yannick Thoelen
DF	6	(Belgium) Jannes Van Hecke
FW	9	(Belgium) Julien Ngoy		(substituted on) 75'
FW	10	(Israel) Yonas Malede
DF	21	(Belgium) Boli Bolingoli		(substituted on) 63'
MF	22	(Cape Verde) Alessio da Cruz		(substituted on) 46'
DF	23	(Belgium) Enock Agyei		(substituted on) 84'
Manager:
(Belgium) Steven Defour

GK	1	(France) Jean Butez
RB	2	(Belgium) Ritchie De Laet
CB	51	(Ecuador) Willian Pacho		(substituted off) 69'
CB	23	(Belgium) Toby Alderweireld	(yellow card) 9'
LB	34	(Belgium) Jelle Bataille	(yellow card) 6'	(substituted off) 69'
DM	48	(Belgium) Arthur Vermeeren
RM	7	(Netherlands) Gyrano Kerk		(substituted off) 85'
CM	14	(Netherlands) Calvin Stengs
CM	24	(Netherlands) Jurgen Ekkelenkamp		(substituted off) 69'
LM	11	(Albania) Arbnor Muja
CF	18	(Netherlands) Vincent Janssen		(substituted off) 73'
Substitutes:
GK	26	(Belgium) Ortwin De Wolf
MF	8	(Nigeria) Alhassan Yusuf
FW	10	(Belgium) Michel-Ange Balikwisha	(yellow card) 87'	(substituted on) 73'
DF	22	(Argentina) Gastón Ávila		(substituted on) 69'
MF	27	(Belgium) Mandela Keita		(substituted on) 69'
MF	32	(Germany) Christopher Scott		(substituted on) 85'
DF	33	(Belgium) Zeno van den Bosch		(substituted on) 69'
Manager:
(Netherlands) Mark van Bommel

Match rules

- 90 minutes.
- 30 minutes of extra time if necessary.
- Penalty shoot-out if scores still level.
- Seven named substitutes.
- Maximum of five substitutions.
