= 2022–23 Belgian Cup =

Tournament details
- Country: Belgium
- Dates: 24 July 2022 – 30 April 2023
- Teams: 314

Final positions
- Champions: Antwerp
- Runners-up: Mechelen

Tournament statistics
- Matches played: 313
- Goals scored: 1,135 (3.63 per match)

The 2022–23 Belgian Cup, called the Croky Cup for sponsorship reasons, was the 68th season of Belgium's annual football cup competition. The competition began on 24 July 2022 and ended with the final on 30 April 2023. The winners of the competition will qualify for the 2023–24 UEFA Europa League play-off round.

Match times up to 30 October 2022 and from 26 March 2023 were CEST (UTC+2). Times on interim ("winter") days were CET (UTC+1).

== Competition format ==
The competition consists of one preliminary round, followed by ten proper rounds. All rounds are single-match elimination rounds. When tied after 90 minutes in the first three rounds, penalties will be taken immediately. From round four, when tied after 90 minutes first an extra time period of 30 minutes will be played, then penalties are to be taken if still necessary.

Teams will enter the competition in different rounds, based upon their 2022–23 league affiliation. Teams from the fifth-level Belgian Division 3 or lower will begin in round 1, with the exception of sixteen teams from the Belgian Provincial Leagues which were randomly drawn to start in the preliminary round. Belgian Division 2 teams entered in round 2, Belgian National Division 1 teams entered in round 3, Belgian First Division B teams in round 5 and finally the Belgian First Division A teams entered in round 6. U23 teams are not eligible for the Belgian Cup and will not enter the cup.

Round	Clubs remaining	Clubs involved	Winners from previous round	New entries this round	Leagues entering at this round
Preliminary Round	314	16	none	16	Belgian Provincial Leagues (16 teams)
Round 1	306	216	8	208	Belgian Division 3 (63 teams) and Belgian Provincial Leagues (154 teams)
Round 2	198	156	108	48	Belgian Division 2 (48 teams)
Round 3	120	96	78	18	Belgian National Division 1 (16 teams) and Belgian First Division B (2 teams)
Round 4	72	48	48	none	none
Round 5	48	32	24	8	Belgian First Division B (6 teams) and Belgian First Division A (2 teams)
Round 6	32	32	16	16	Belgian First Division A (16 teams)
Round 7	16	16	16	none	none
Quarter-Finals	8	8	8	none	none
Semi-Finals	4	4	4	none	none
Final	2	2	2	none	none

== Round and draw dates ==
Round	Draw date	Match dates
Preliminary Round	29 June 2022	24 July 2022
First Round	29 June 2022	31 July 2022
Second Round	29 June 2022	6 & 7 August 2022
Third Round	29 June 2022	13, 14 & 16 August 2022
Fourth Round	6 July 2022	20, 21 & 23 August 2022
Fifth Round	6 July 2022	August & September 2022
Sixth Round	27 September 2022	8, 9 & 10 November 2022
Seventh Round	10 November 2022	20, 21 & 22 December 2022
Quarter-finals	22 December 2022	10, 11 & 12 January 2023
Semi-finals	13 January 2023	Leg 1: 1–2 February 2023; Leg 2: 1–2 March 2023
Final		30 April 2023

== Preliminary round ==
This round of matches was played on 24 July 2022 and included sixteen teams playing in the Belgian Provincial Leagues.

Tie	Home team (tier)	Score	Away team (tier)
1	Jabbeke (6)	1–3	Sassport Boezinge (6)
2	Rhodienne-De-Hoek (6)	2–0	Waterloo (7)
3	Huy B (7)	3–0	Chastre (7)
4	St. Vith (8)	0–5	Vaux-Noville (6)
5	Hoeselt (7)	11–0	Bressoux (8)
6	Schriek (8)	4–1	Groot-Dilbeek (7)
7	Rapid Leest (7)	1–2	Peer (7)
8	Sint-Niklaas (6)	2–5	Liedekerke (6)

== First round ==
This round of matches was played on 31 July 2022.

Tie	Home team (tier)	Score	Away team (tier)
Group 1
9	Roeselare-Daisel (6)	1–0	RC Lauwe (6)
10	Rumbeke (6)	1–0	Blankenberge (7)
11	Sassport Boezinge (6)	8–0	Lissewege (7)
12	Varsenare (6)	0–2	Anzegem (5)
13	Etoiles D'Ere (7)	0–5	Diksmuide (6)
14	Aalter (5)	3–2	Club Roeselare (7)
15	Lendelede Sport (8)	0–2	Wervik (5)
16	Zedelgem (6)	2–3	Racing Waregem (6)
17	Wielsbeke (5)	1–0	Club Lauwe (6)
18	Wevelgem (6)	2–1	Zonnebeke (7)
19	Poesele (7)	2–3	Kleit Maldegem (6)
20	Heestert (6)	7–0	Zandvoorde (8)
21	Tournai (5)	1–1 (p)	Deerlijk (6)
Group 2
22	Rhodienne-De-Hoek (6)	9–0	Cuesmes (7)
23	Vlaamse Ardennen (6)	4–1	Anvaing (7)
24	Pays Vert Ostiches-Ath (5)	4–0	Soignies (6)
25	Oetingen (8)	1–4	Geraardsbergen (7)
26	Le Rœulx (6)	0–1	Entité Manageoise (5)
27	Ophain (7)	(p) 0–0	Voorde-Appelterre (5)
28	Lasne Ohain (6)	4–1	Rapid Symphorinois A (5)
29	Union Saint-Ghislain Tertre-Hautrage (5)	4–0	Winnik (7)
30	CS Braine (5)	1–2	Beloeil (6)
31	Ecaussinnes (8)	0–1	Jemappes (7)
32	Anderlues (7)	3–0	Rapid Symphorinois B (7)
33	Renaissance Mons A (5)	3–1	Rixensart (7)
34	Renaissance Mons B (6)	2–0	BX Brussels (6)
Group 3
35	Montignies A (6)	1–2	Fizoise (6)
36	Couvin-Mariembourg (5)	2–0	Huy B (7)
37	Arquet (6)	(p) 0–0	Ransartoise (6)
38	Spy (6)	1–2	Aische (6)
39	Olympic Namur (7)	0–2	Grand-Leez (6)
40	Onhaye (5)	2–0	Loyers (6)
41	Jeunesse Roselies (7)	3–2	Huccorgne (7)
42	Perwez (6)	9–1	Montignies B (8)
43	Nismes (6)	0–6	Bossière/Gembloux (7)
44	Huy (5)	3–2	Lustin (7)
45	Villers-la-Ville (7)	0–1	Gosselies (5)
46	Monceau (5)	7–1	Gerpinnes (7)
47	Biesme (6)	1–1 (p)	Thisnes (8)
48	Tamines (5)	5–0	La Molignée (7)
Group 4
49	Chevetogne (6)	0–2	Habay La Neuve (5)
50	Malmundaria (6)	5–0	Givry (5)
51	Saint-Mard (7)	0–4	Marloie (5)
52	Vaux-Noville (6)	1–1 (p)	Meix-dt-Virton (6)
53	Trois-Ponts (7)	1–0	Ethe Belmont (7)
54	Libramont (5)	1–2	Condrusien (6)
55	Ster Francorchamps (6)	2–2 (p)	Freylange (6)
56	Assenois (6)	0–1	Longlier (6)
57	Bastogne (6)	0–2	Durbuy (5)
58	Arlon (6)	2–1	Aubange (7)
59	Houffaloise (6)	0–2	Rochefort (5)
60	Ciney (5)	1–0	Messancy (6)
61	Mormont (5)	5–0	Sart (7)

Tie	Home team (tier)	Score	Away team (tier)
Group 5
62	Torpedo Hasselt (6)	2–1	Schoonbeek-Beverst (5)
63	Wellen (5)	11–0	Oreye Union (8)
64	Hombourg (6)	(p) 1–1	Zonhoven United (6)
65	Richelle (5)	6–2	Bree-Beek (6)
66	STA Genk (9)	0–10	Herstal (5)
67	La Calamine (5)	1–0	Aubel (6)
68	Zepperen-Brustem (6)	2–1	Ans Montegnée (8)
69	Raeren-Eynatten (5)	3–0	Hoeselt (7)
70	Sprimont (5)	3–0	Louwel (6)
71	Heide Hasselt (7)	3–0	Neeroeteren (9)
72	Vlijtingen (7)	0–4	Termien (5)
73	Esperanza Pelt (5)	2–2 (p)	Elsautoise (6)
74	Eupen 1963 B (9)	0–7	Aywaille (5)
75	Sart-Les-Spa (7)	5–0	Biesen (8)
Group 6
76	Kampenhout (5)	(p) 3–3	Vissenaken (8)
77	Wavre Limal (7)	0–3	Schriek (8)
78	Borgth-Humbeek (6)	2–1	Herk-De-Stad (7)
79	Meerbeek (7)	2–1	Hoegaarden-Outgaarden (8)
80	Overijse (5)	4–0	FC Schaerbeek (7)
81	Léopold (5)	3–1	Herselt (6)
82	Bierbeek (6)	1–0	RWL Sport (7)
83	Infinity Vilvoorde (8)	0–1	Stade Everois (6)
84	Betekom (5)	2–0	Grimbergen (6)
85	Jodoigne (5)	4–1	Stockel (6)
86	Grez-Doiceau (6)	2–1	Wolvertem Merchtem (5)
87	Linden (6)	5–1	Eppegem (5)
88	Wijgmaal (5)	5–0	Kortenaken (8)
89	Crossing Schaerbeek (5)	1–0	Wambeek Ternat (6)
Group 7
90	Zoersel (6)	0–5	ASV Geel (5)
91	Wijnegem (8)	0–3	Nijlen (7)
92	Koersel (6)	3–1	Berchem Sport B (8)
93	Zwarte Leeuw (5)	3–1	Antonia (6)
94	Punt-Larum (7)	0–8	Sint-Lenaarts (5)
95	Wezel Sport (5)	6–0	Lutlommel (8)
96	Beringen (5)	4–0	Sparta Lille (9)
97	Kontich (6)	0–4	Ranst (6)
98	Peer (7)	0–1	Achel (6)
99	Schorvoort Turnhout (7)	1–5	Witgoor Dessel (5)
100	Houtvenne (5)	3–0	De Kempen Tielen-Lichtaart A (6)
101	De Kempen Tielen-Lichtaart B (8)	0–2	Berlaar-Heikant (6)
102	Diest (5)	1–2	Retie (6)
103	Ternesse Wommelgem (6)	1–2	Svelta Melsele (6)
Group 8
104	Grembergen (6)	1–3	Mariekerk-Branst (6)
105	Kalfort Puursica (9)	7–1	Relegem (8)
106	Avanti Stekene (5)	1–0	Eendracht Zele (6)
107	Destelbergen (7)	3–0	St-Joris Sleidinge (7)
108	Nielse (9)	1–7	Elene-Grotenberge (5)
109	St-Martens-Latem (7)	(p) 1–1	Meetjesland (7)
110	Mariakerke (6)	4–0	Oppuurs (8)
111	Munkzwalm (6)	0–2	Drongen (7)
112	Hekelgem (7)	0–1	Hamme (5)
113	Berlare (8)	4–3	Zingem (8)
114	Liedekerke (6)	1–3	Hoger Op Kalken (5)
115	Denderhoutem (6)	1–0	Dendermonde (7)
116	Lokeren Doorslaar (7)	0–2	Jong Lede (5)

== Second round ==
This round of matches was played on 6 and 7 August 2022.

Tie	Home team (tier)	Score	Away team (tier)
117	Oostkamp (4)	1–1 (p)	Mariekerk-Branst (6)
118	Tongeren (4)	3–2	Termien (5)
119	Erpe-Mere United (4)	2–0	Jeunesse Roselies (7)
120	Destelbergen (7)	1–2	Merelbeke (4)
121	Berlare (8)	2–0	Vlaamse Ardennen (6)
122	Jodoigne (5)	2–3	Herstal (5)
123	Wevelgem (6)	3–3 (p)	Overijse (5)
124	Sint-Lenaarts (5)	1–0	Denderhoutem (6)
125	Beringen (5)	1–0	Elene-Grotenberge (5)
126	Aische (6)	2–2 (p)	Jong Lede (5)
127	Oudenaarde (4)	(p) 2–2	Taminoise (5)
128	Verlaine (4)	4–1	Sart-Les-Spa (7)
129	Pepingen-Halle (4)	0–0 (p)	Renaissance Mons A (5)
130	Hades (4)	4–1	Lasne Ohaine (6)
131	Grand-Leez (6)	1–2	Arquet (6)
132	Koersel (6)	2–0	Lebbeke (4)
133	Trois-Ponts (7)	3–1	Renaissance Mons B (6)
134	Fizoise (6)	2–1	Rhodienne-De-Hoek (6)
135	Entité Manageoise (5)	2–1	Turnhout (4)
136	Diegem (4)	5–4	Longlier (6)
137	Borgth-Humbeek (6)	2–0	Huy (5)
138	Diksmuide (6)	1–1 (p)	Avanti Stekene (5)
139	Geraardsbergen (7)	3–5	Ranst (6)
140	Gosselies (5)	6–3	Anderlues (7)
141	Meux (4)	3–1	Beloeil (6)
142	RC Gent (4)	3–4	Pays Vert Ostiches-Ath (5)
143	Wellen (5)	3–0	Elsautoise (6)
144	Torhout (4)	0–0 (p)	Witgoor Dessel (5)
145	Meerbeek (7)	0–1	Bossière/Gembloux (7)
146	Hoger Op Kalken (5)	3–3 (p)	Wielsbeke (5)
147	Wijgmaal (5)	2–1	Monceau (5)
148	Zelzate (4)	2–0	Racing Waregem (6)
149	Retie (6)	0–2	Deerlijk (6)
150	Zwarte Leeuw (5)	2–1	Solières (4)
151	Richelle (5)	1–2	Wezel Sport (5)
152	Zepperen-Brustem (6)	1–2	Drongen (7)
153	Lyra-Lierse Berlaar (4)	2–1	Bierbeek (6)
154	Aywaille (5)	1–2	Harelbeke (4)
155	Waremmien (4)	2–1	Vaux-Noville (6)

Tie	Home team (tier)	Score	Away team (tier)
156	Schriek (8)	0–1	Biesme (6)
157	Perwez (6)	2–0	Ciney (5)
158	Dison (4)	1–1 (p)	Hamme (5)
159	Gullegem (4)	2–1	Berlaar-Heikant (6)
160	Olsa Brakel (4)	5–0	Jemappes (7)
161	KRC Mechelen (4)	4–0	Betekom (5)
162	St-Martens-Latem (7)	1–3	Houtvenne (5)
163	City Pirates (4)	3–1	Rochefort (5)
164	Raeren-Eynatten (5)	7–1	Grez-Doiceau (6)
165	Sprimont (5)	9–1	Mariakerke (6)
166	Rebecq (4)	4–0	Freylange (6)
167	Kalfort Puursica (9)	0–6	Bocholter (4)
168	Heide Hasselt (7)	0–4	Couvin-Mariembourg (5)
169	Acren-Lessines (4)	4–1	Malmundaria (6)
170	Onhaye (5)	4–1	Kampenhout (5)
171	Lille (4)	3–1	Arlon (6)
172	Warnant (4)	0–0 (p)	Habay La Neuve (5)
173	Binche (4)	2–0	Union Saint-Ghislain Tertre-Hautrage (5)
174	Ganshoren (4)	2–1	Léopold (5)
175	Marloie (5)	0–1	Sporting Hasselt (4)
176	Rumbeke (6)	0–3	Sparta Petegem (4)
177	Lokeren-Temse (4)	2–1	Nijlen (7)
178	Jette (4)	2–1	Svelta Melsele (6)
179	La Louvière Centre (4)	1–1 (p)	Roeselare-Daisel (6)
180	ASV Geel (5)	(p) 1–1	Aalter (5)
181	Cappellen (4)	1–0	Torpedo Hasselt (6)
182	Namur (4)	1–0	Crossing Schaerbeek (5)
183	Berchem (4)	3–0	Durbuy (5)
184	Hombourg (6)	(p) 2–2	Hamoir (4)
185	Sassport Boezinge	1–2	Westhoek (4)
186	Mormont (5)	2–1	Heestert (6)
187	Dikkelvenne (4)	1–0	Wervik (5)
188	Tubize-Braine (4)	2–0	Ophain (7)
189	Linden (6)	(p) 2–2	La Calamine (5)
190	Londerzeel (4)	9–0	Condrusien (6)
191	Stade Everois (6)	1–4	Belisia (4)
192	Achel (6)	5–2	Stockay (4)
193	Wetteren (4)	6–0	Kleit Maldegem (6)
194	Eendracht Aalst (4)	5–1	Anzegem (5)

== Third round ==
This round of matches was played on 13, 14 and 16 August 2022.

Tie	Home team (tier)	Score	Away team (tier)
195	Dikkelvenne (4)	3–1	Herstal (5)
196	Onhaye (5)	1–1 (p)	Beringen (5)
197	Dessel Sport (3)	7–1	Wielsbeke (5)
198	Pays Vert Ostiches-Ath (5)	2–0	Acren-Lessines (4)
199	Lyra-Lierse Berlaar (4)	2–0	Zwarte Leeuw (5)
200	Rebecq (4)	1–2	Meux (4)
201	Dender EH (2)	4–0	Wetteren (4)
202	Heist (3)	3–0	Achel (6)
203	Tienen (3)	0–1	Perwez (6)
204	Binche (4)	3–0	Wijgmaal (5)
205	Westhoek (4)	3–2	Habay La Neuve (5)
206	Eendracht Aalst (4)	8–0	Mandel United (3)
207	Waremmien (4)	0–2	Ganshoren (4)
208	Hades (4)	0–2	Sint-Eloois-Winkel (3)
209	Borgth-Humbeek (6)	0–2	Sparta Petegem (4)
210	Arquet (6)	1–9	Virton (2)
211	Bocholter (4)	2–1	Entité Manageoise (5)
212	Zelzate (4)	3–4	Olsa Brakel (4)
213	Gullegem (4)	1–0	Witgoor Dessel (5)
214	Verlaine (4)	0–3	RFC Liège (3)
215	Avanti Stekene (5)	1–3	Linden (6)
216	Knokke (3)	3–1	ASV Geel (5)
217	Fizoise (6)	3–2	Roeselare-Daisel (6)
218	Londerzeel (4)	2–4	RAAL La Louvière (3)

Tie	Home team (tier)	Score	Away team (tier)
219	Francs Borains (3)	2–0	Merelbeke (4)
220	Deerlijk (6)	0–2	Overijse (5)
221	Raeren-Eynatten (5)	0–4	Tubize-Braine (4)
222	Sprimont (5)	1–3	Thes Sport (3)
223	Erpe-Mere United (4)	1–1 (p)	Lille (4)
224	Koersel (6)	1–1 (p)	Belisia (4)
225	Visé (3)	2–2 (p)	Harelbeke (4)
226	Ranst (6)	0–3	Houtvenne (5)
227	Lokeren-Temse (4)	3–0	Renaissance Mons A (5)
228	Trois-Ponts (7)	1–6	Jette (4)
229	Gosselies (5)	1–2	Wezel Sport (5)
230	Hombourg (6)	0–1	Jong Lede (5)
231	KRC Mechelen (4)	6–2	Drongen (7)
232	Oudenaarde (4)	2–0	Berlare (8)
233	City Pirates (4)	1–0	Olympic Club Charleroi (3)
234	Berchem (4)	1–7	Patro Eisden Maasmechelen (3)
235	Mariekerk-Branst (6)	1–7	Wellen (5)
236	Biesme (6)	0–2	Hamme (5)
237	Namur (4)	1–1 (p)	Tongeren (4)
238	Ninove (3)	3–1	Couvin-Mariembourg (5)
239	Sint-Lenaarts (5)	2–2 (p)	Cappellen (4)
240	Sporting Hasselt (4)	7–0	Bossière/Gembloux (7)
241	Diegem (4)	0–4	Rupel Boom (3)
242	Mormont (5)	0–1	Hoogstraten (3)

== Fourth round ==
This round of matches was played on 20, 21 and 23 August 2022

Tie	Home team (tier)	Score	Away team (tier)
243	Linden (6)	2–3	Cappellen (4)
244	Ninove (3)	1–2	Bocholter (4)
245	Thes Sport (3)	2–1	Pays Vert Ostiches-Ath (5)
246	Oudenaarde (4)	3–0	Hamme (5)
247	Knokke (3)	(p)0–0	Houtvenne (5)
248	Wellen (5)	2–3	Lokeren-Temse (4)
249	Dender EH (2)	2–1	Jette (4)
250	Westhoek (4)	(p)1–1	Jong Lede (5)
251	Overijse (5)	2–1	RFC Liège (3)
252	Sporting Hasselt (4)	2–0	Gullegem (4)
253	Sparta Petegem (4)	2–4	KRC Mechelen (4)
254	City Pirates (4)	1–2	Dikkelvenne (4)
255	Lille (4)	2–3	Heist (3)
256	Meux (4)	(p)1–1	Perwez (6)
257	Patro Eisden Maasmechelen (3)	3–2	Ganshoren (4)
258	Tubize-Braine (4)	1–3	Hoogstraten (3)
259	Koersel (6)	1–5	Rupel Boom (3)
260	Namur (4)	1–2	Virton (2)
261	Francs Borains (3)	3–2	Olsa Brakel (4)
262	Fizoise (6)	0–2	Dessel Sport (3)
263	Visé (3)	3–1	Binche (4)
264	Sint-Eloois-Winkel (3)	2–1	Onhaye (5)
265	RAAL La Louvière (3)	2–1	Lyra-Lierse Berlaar (4)
266	Eendracht Aalst (4)	2–1	Wezel Sport (5)

== Fifth round ==
This round of matches was played between 27 August 2022 and 25 September 2022

Tie	Home team (tier)	Score	Away team (tier)
267	Lierse Kempenzonen (2)	5–1	KRC Mechelen (4)
268	Dender EH (2)	2–0	Dikkelvenne (4)
269	Dessel Sport (3)	2–1 (a.e.t.)	Virton (2)
270	Thes Sport (3)	3–1	Hoogstraten (3)
271	Molenbeek (2)	3–0	Oudenaarde (4)
272	Francs Borains (3)	3–1	Rupel Boom (3)
273	Cappellen (4)	2–1	Heist (3)
274	Patro Eisden Maasmechelen (3)	3–0	Westhoek (4)
275	Eendracht Aalst (4)	1–3 (a.e.t.)	Westerlo (1)
276	Bocholter (4)	1–2 (a.e.t.)	Deinze (2)
277	Meux (4)	4–1	Sporting Hasselt (4)
278	Lokeren-Temse (4)	1–0	Overijse (5)
279	Knokke (3)	0–4	Beerschot (2)
280	Sint-Eloois-Winkel (3)	0–2	Seraing (1)
281	Beveren (2)	2–0	Visé (3)
282	Lommel (2)	2–0	RAAL La Louvière (3)

== Sixth round ==
The draw for the sixth round was made on 28 September 2022, a few days after the conclusion of the last match of the previous round. Newly entering this round were the teams from the Belgian First Division A, with the exception of Westerlo and Seraing which had entered in the prior round. The 16 teams entering at this stage were seeded and could not meet each other. The lowest teams still in the competition were Cappellen, Lokeren-Temse and Meux, from the Belgian Division 2 (tier 4).

8 November 2022	Seraing (1)	4–1 (a.e.t.)	Charleroi (1)	Seraing
19:30 CET	Sambu 79'; Vagner 105', 110'; Wasinski 107' (o.g.)	Report	Heymans 16'	Stadium: Stade du Pairay; Referee: Simon Bourdeaud'hui

8 November 2022	Dender EH (2)	0–1	Standard Liège (1)
20:30 CET		Report	Balikwisha 74'

10 November 2022	Lierse Kempenzonen (2)	2–2 (a.e.t.) (8–9 p)	Anderlecht (1)
20:45 CET	Tabekou 24'; Vekemans 78'		Silva 23' (pen.); Stroeykens 45+4'
	Penalties
	Raemaekers (penalty scored); Rocha (penalty scored); Schouterden (penalty scored); Brebels (penalty scored); Van Acker (penalty scored); Vekemans (penalty scored); Gillekens (penalty scored); De Schrijver (penalty scored); De Schryver (penalty missed); Libert (penalty missed)		(penalty scored) Refaelov; (penalty scored) Leoni; (penalty scored) Diawara; (penalty scored) Sadiki; (penalty scored) Silva; (penalty scored) Delcroix; (penalty scored) Raman; (penalty scored) Ashimeru; (penalty missed) Lissens; (penalty scored) Verbruggen

8 November 2022	Deinze (2)	3–0	Eupen (1)	Deinze
20:00 CET	De Belder 37'; Quintero 44'; Balaj 90'	Report		Stadium: Burgemeester Van De Wiele Stadion

9 November 2022	Westerlo (1)	0–1	Genk (1)	Westerlo
20:30 CET		Report	Onuachu 14'	Stadium: Het Kuipje; Referee: Bert Put

9 November 2022	Lommel (2)	0–1	Zulte Waregem (1)	Lommel
20:00 CET		Report	Gano 69'	Stadium: Soevereinstadion; Referee: Ken Vermeiren

10 November 2022	Beveren (2)	2–2 (a.e.t.) (2–4 p)	Antwerp (1)	Beveren
20:00 CET	Mbokani 66', 79'		Stengs 45'; Tshimanga 85' (o.g.)	Stadium: Freethiel Stadion
	Penalties
	Hoggas (penalty missed); Mbokani (penalty missed); Kablan (penalty scored); Barry (penalty scored)		(penalty scored) Frey; (penalty scored) Muja; (penalty scored) Nsimba; (penalty scored) Balikwisha

9 November 2022	Cercle Brugge (1)	3–1	Beerschot (2)	Bruges
20:00 CET	Denkey 4', 51'; Ueda 48'	Report	Verlinden 44'	Stadium: Jan Breydel Stadium; Referee: Matonga Simonini

9 November 2022	Patro Eisden Maasmechelen (3)	0–2 (a.e.t.)	Club Brugge (1)	Maasmechelen
20:45 CET		Report	Lang 103', 118'	Stadium: Patro Stadion

9 November 2022	Sint-Truiden (1)	1–0	Meux (4)
20:30 CET	Kaya 83'	Report

9 November 2022	Lokeren-Temse (4)	0–5	KV Mechelen (1)	Lokeren
20:00 CET		Report	Schoofs 20'; Malede 42', 49'; Da Cruz 64'; Van Hoorenbeeck 85'	Stadium: Daknamstadion

9 November 2022	Dessel Sport (3)	0–5	Gent (1)	Dessel
20:30 CET		Report	Hong 1', 20'; Van Daele 7'; Depoitre 24'; Hjulsager 48'	Stadium: Armand Melis Stadium; Referee: Kevin Debeuckelaere

8 November 2022	Francs Borains (3)	0–5	OH Leuven (1)	Boussu
20:30 CET		Report	Maertens 17'; De Norre 44'; González 48'; Mpati 63' (o.g.); Vlietinck 70'	Stadium: Stade Robert Urbain

9 November 2022	Thes Sport (3)	1–4	Oostende (1)	Tessenderlo
20:00 CET	Vanaken 81'	Report	Ambrose 56'; Atanga 64'; Bätzner 77'; Berte 88'	Stadium: Sportcentrum Tessenderlo; Referee: Theophile Diskeuve

10 November 2022	RWDM (2)	1–3	Kortrijk (1)	Brussels
20:00 CET	Botella 56'	Report	Bruno 72', 83'; Messaoudi 90+3'	Stadium: Stade Edmond Machtens

9 November 2022	Cappellen (4)	1–7	Union SG (1)	Kapellen
20:00 CET	El Madani 28'	Report	Adingra 40', 69'; El Azzouzi 52', 56'; Nilsson 64', 74'; Puertas 82'	Stadium: Stadion Jos van Wellen; Referee: Laurent Willems

== Seventh round ==
This round of matches was played on 20, 21 and 22 December 2022. The draw took place on 10 November 2022 after the conclusion of the last game, which was Lierse Kempenzonen against Anderlecht. All teams left played in the Jupiler Pro League, apart from KMSK Deinze who played in the Challenger Pro League (2nd level).

20 December 2022	Antwerp (1)	4–0	Standard Liège (1)	Antwerp
20:45 CET	Bataille 17'; Frey 56'; Muja 60'; Stengs 80'	Report		Stadium: Bosuilstadion

20 December 2022	KV Mechelen (1)	1–0	Seraing (1)	Mechelen
20:00 CET	Mrabti 57'	Report		Stadium: Achter de Kazerne; Referee: Alexandre Boucaut

21 December 2022	Club Brugge (1)	1–4	Sint-Truiden (1)	Bruges
20:00 CET	Lang 18'	Report	Brüls 34'; Bruno 63', 89'; Hayashi 70'	Stadium: Jan Breydel Stadium

20 December 2022	Union SG (1)	2–1	Oostende (1)	Forest
20:00 CET	Boniface 11'; Adingra 84'	Report		Stadium: Joseph Marien Stadium; Referee: Kevin Van Damme

21 December 2022	Genk (1)	1–0 (a.e.t.)	Anderlecht (1)	Genk
20:45 CET	Paintsil 96'	Report		Stadium: Cegeka Arena

20 December 2022	OH Leuven (1)	1–3	Kortrijk (1)	Leuven
20:00 CET	González 90+5'	Report	Bruno 55'; Keïta 82'; Avenatti 87'	Stadium: Den Dreef

21 December 2022	Deinze (2)	1–2	Zulte Waregem (1)	Deinze
20:00 CET	Balaj 50'	Report	Ndour 87', 89'	Stadium: Burgemeester Van De Wiele Stadion; Referee: Wesli De Cremer

20 December 2022	Gent (1)	2–0 (a.e.t.)	Cercle Brugge (1)	Ghent
20:00 CET	Cuypers 110'; Fofana 120'	Report		Stadium: Ghelamco Arena

== Quarter-finals ==
The draw for the quarter-finals was made on Thursday 22 December, one day after the conclusion of the last match of the previous round. All teams left played at the top level (Belgian Pro League).

11 January 2023	Kortrijk (1)	0–1	KV Mechelen (1)	Kortrijk
18:30 CET		Report	Walsh 90+1'	Stadium: Guldensporen Stadion; Referee: Jasper Vergoote

11 January 2023	Zulte Waregem (1)	2–0	Sint-Truiden (1)	Waregem
20:00 CET	Fadera 42'; Vormer 63'	Report		Stadium: Elindus Arena; Referee: Alexandre Boucaut

11 January 2023	Genk (1)	0–3	Antwerp (1)	Genk
20:45 CET		Report	Janssen 4'; De Laet 43'; Balikwisha 50'	Stadium: Cegeka Arena; Referee: Erik Lambrechts

12 January 2023	Union SG (1)	4–0	Gent (1)	Vorst
20:45 CET	Nilsson 3'; Lazare 33', 90+2'; Boniface 40'	Report		Stadium: Joseph Marien Stadium; Referee: Jonathan Lardot

== Semi-finals ==
The draw for the semi-finals was made on Friday 13 January, one day after the conclusion of the last match of the previous round.

=== First legs ===
1 February 2023	Union SG (1)	1–0	Antwerp (1)	Forest
20:45 CET	Nieuwkoop 84'	Report		Stadium: Joseph Marien Stadium; Referee: Jonathan Lardot

2 February 2023	Zulte Waregem (1)	1–2	KV Mechelen (1)	Waregem
20:45 CET	Fadera 2'	Report	Storm 25'; Mrabti 51'	Stadium: Elindus Arena; Referee: Jan Boterberg

=== Second legs ===
28 February 2023	KV Mechelen (1)	1–0 (3–1 agg.)	Zulte Waregem (1)	Mechelen
20:45 CET	Bates 76'	Report		Stadium: Achter de Kazerne; Referee: Bram Van Driessche

2 March 2023	Antwerp (1)	1–0 (a.e.t.) (1–1 agg.) (4–3 p)	Union SG (1)	Antwerp
20:45 CET	Janssen 56'	Report		Stadium: Bosuilstadion; Referee: Lawrence Visser
	Penalties
	Janssen (penalty missed); Keita (penalty scored); Muja (penalty scored); Corbanie (penalty scored); Ávila (penalty scored)		(penalty scored) Nilsson; (penalty scored) Puertas; (penalty missed) Adingra; (penalty scored) Nieuwkoop; (penalty missed) Teuma

== Final ==
30 April 2023
14:30 CEST

KV Mechelen	0–2	Antwerp
	Report	Janssen 35' (pen.); Balikwisha 81'

King Baudouin Stadium, Brussels
Attendance: 41,500
Referee: Jonathan Lardot
