= Keyennu Lont =

Dutch footballer (born 2000)

Personal information
- Date of birth: 4 April 2000 (age 26)
- Place of birth: Zwaag, Netherlands
- Position: Winger

Youth career
- –2012: De Zouaven
- 2012–2019: AZ
- 2020–2021: Feyenoord

Senior career*
Years	Team	Apps	(Gls)
2019–2020	Jong AZ	4	(0)
2020	Jong ADO Den Haag	3	(0)
2021–2022	Helmond Sport	7	(0)
Total		14	(0)
- * Club domestic league appearances and goals

Keyennu Lont (born 4 April 2000) is a Dutch former professional footballer who played as a winger.

== Career ==
=== Early years ===
Lont started his youth career with VV De Zouaven before moving to the academy of AZ. He was included in the reserve team Jong AZ in 2019, where he made his professional debut in the Eerste Divisie on 13 September 2019. This was in the 2–3 away loss against Jong PSV, in which he came on as a substitute for Thijs Oosting in the 87th minute.

In January 2020, Lont signed a contract until the end of the season with ADO Den Haag, where he played three games for the reserve team Jong ADO Den Haag in the Derde Divisie. In July 2020, Lont signed on a free transfer for Feyenoord where he was included in the reserve team, Feyenoord U21.

=== Helmond Sport ===
On 25 May 2021, Lont went on trial with Helmond Sport which proved successful. He signed a one-year contract with an option for an additional year on 30 July 2021. On 6 August, the opening day of the 2021–22 Eerste Divisie season, Lont made his debut for Helmond Sport, coming on as a substitute for Jules Houttequiet in a 0–2 loss against FC Den Bosch at De Vliert. He suffered a toe injury into the season, which kept him sidelined for months. On 31 March 2022, the club announced that it would not extend the contracts of a number of players, including Lont, effectively making him a free agent from 1 July.

== Personal life ==
In 2021, Lont started dating Dutch television presenter Veronica van Hoogdalem.

In 2024, Lont announced his departure from professional football to pursue a career in boxing, expressing confidence in an interview: "I feel that I will become a professional boxer."

== Career statistics ==
Appearances and goals by club, season and competition
Club	Season	League			Cup		Other		Total	
Club	Season	Division	Apps	Goals	Apps	Goals	Apps	Goals	Apps	Goals
Jong AZ	2019–20	Eerste Divisie	4	0	—		—		4	0
Jong ADO Den Haag	2020–21	Derde Divisie	3	0	—		—		3	0
Helmond Sport	2021–22	Eerste Divisie	7	0	0	0	—		7	0
Career total			14	0	0	0	0	0	14	0
