= Jordi Vanlerberghe =

Belgian footballer (born 1996)

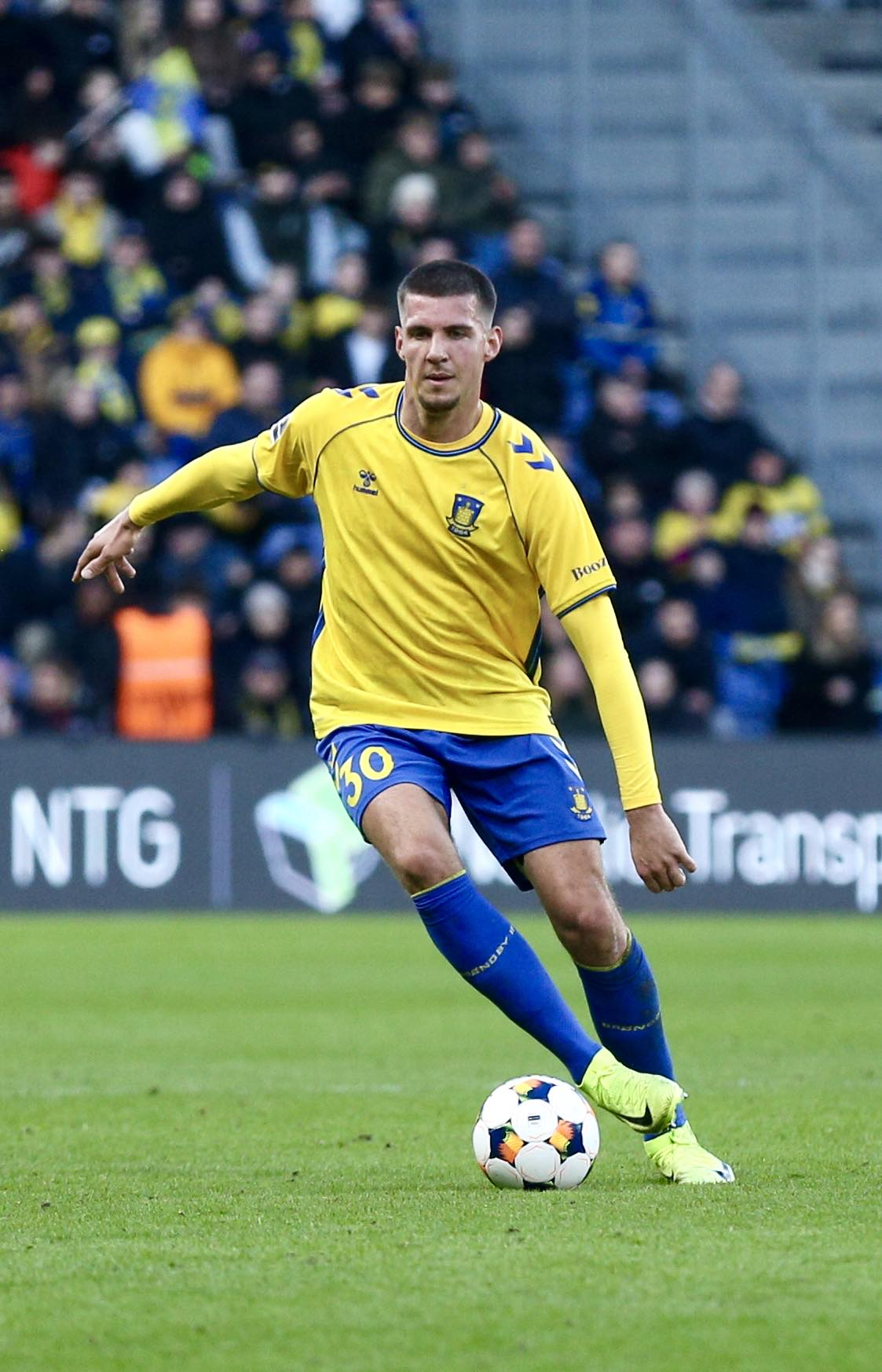
- Vanlerberghe in 2025 with Brøndby

Personal information
- Date of birth: 27 June 1996 (age 30)
- Place of birth: Duffel, Belgium
- Height: 1.89 m (6 ft 2 in)
- Positions: Centre-back; defensive midfielder

Team information
- Current team: Brøndby
- Number: 30

Youth career
- 2001–2004: KFC Duffel
- 2004–2012: Mechelen

Senior career*
Years	Team	Apps	(Gls)
2012–2017	Mechelen	47	(3)
2017–2020	Club Brugge	7	(0)
2018–2019	→ Oostende (loan)	31	(4)
2019–2020	→ Mechelen (loan)	17	(3)
2020–2024	Mechelen	122	(9)
2024–	Brøndby	53	(4)

International career
2011–2012	Belgium U16	5	(2)
2012–2013	Belgium U17	8	(0)
2013–2014	Belgium U18	3	(2)
2014	Belgium U19	5	(0)
2017–2019	Belgium U21	8	(1)
- * Club domestic league appearances and goals as of 20:01, 25 August 2026 (UTC)

Jordi Vanlerberghe (born 27 June 1996) is a Belgian professional footballer who plays as a defensive midfielder or centre-back for Danish Superliga club Brøndby.

== Club career ==
=== Early career and Mechelen ===
Born in Duffel to a family with a footballing background, Vanlerberghe began playing at local club KFC Duffel before joining the KV Mechelen youth academy at the age of six.

He made his Belgian Pro League debut on 27 October 2012 against Lierse at the age of 16, replacing Nicklas Pedersen as an 88th-minute substitute. He scored his first senior goal on 25 January 2014 in a Belgian Cup tie against Mons. Over five seasons in Mechelen's first-team squad he accumulated 50 senior appearances across the league, championship play-offs and cup before agreeing to a move in the summer of 2017.

=== Club Brugge ===
In June 2017, Vanlerberghe signed a four-year contract with Club Brugge. He struggled to displace established midfielders under head coach Ivan Leko during a season in which the club won the Belgian league title; Vanlerberghe later described his first year at Brugge as a difficult period in which he felt he had stopped developing as a player.

==== Loan to Oostende ====
In July 2018, Vanlerberghe was loaned to Oostende, where he was reunited with Gert Verheyen, who had managed him in the Belgium under-21 team. He said on arrival that his priority was to "become a footballer again" after the limited involvement at Brugge.

==== Loan to Mechelen ====
On 10 August 2019, with Mechelen newly promoted in name—the club had been administratively involved in the Operatie Propere Handen match-fixing investigation, the eventual outcome of which left their status uncertain—Vanlerberghe rejoined his first club on a season-long loan with an option to purchase.

=== Return to Mechelen ===
After a brief return to Brugge in the summer of 2020, Vanlerberghe rejoined Mechelen permanently on 29 June 2020; Belgian media reported that he had been judged surplus to requirements at Brugge. In a long-form interview with Gazet van Antwerpen in September 2020 he discussed his transition into a more defensive role, having previously been deployed mainly as a central midfielder.

Across his second spell Vanlerberghe became a regular in the Mechelen side, operating as either a defensive midfielder or centre-back. He was part of the team that reached the 2023 Belgian Cup final on 30 April 2023, which Mechelen lost 2–0 to Antwerp, and again featured in the resulting 2023 Belgian Super Cup in July, which Antwerp won on penalties. In all, he made 183 senior appearances for Mechelen across the two spells.

=== Brøndby ===
On 29 January 2024, Vanlerberghe signed a three-and-a-half-year contract with Danish Superliga club Brøndby. The move from Mechelen, reported to have cost €600,000, was his first transfer abroad after a career spent entirely in Belgium. Assigned the number 30 shirt, Vanlerberghe described the ambitions of himself and the club as "a perfect match". Football director Carsten V. Jensen welcomed him as "a footballer in his prime" with a strong desire to compete, noting his ability to play out from the back.

He made his debut when he came on at half-time in a Superliga win over Viborg in March 2024 and was quickly established in Jesper Sørensen's starting defence. He scored his first goal for the club with a strike from distance in the 4–1 home victory over Silkeborg in the final round of the regular season, sending Brøndby into the championship round one point off the lead. In the championship round he was named in Tipsbladet's team of the round following a strong display against Nordsjælland, the publication describing him as a "solid rock in Brøndby's defence" who was "also strong on the ball". Brøndby's title bid ended on the final matchday when they lost 3–2 at home to AGF and finished a single point behind champions Midtjylland.

Vanlerberghe began the 2024–25 season as a regular starter but suffered a knee and ankle sprain during a 2–0 win at Lyngby on 4 August 2024. Fearing an anterior cruciate ligament injury, he left the stadium on crutches and was ruled out for six weeks. On his return in late September he re-established himself in the starting lineup. Sørensen was dismissed on 11 December 2024 with the club in a difficult run of form; assistant Frederik Birk initially took charge on a caretaker basis before being confirmed as permanent head coach in January 2025. Brøndby finished the season in third place, qualifying for the UEFA Conference League qualifying rounds.

After the 2025–26 season had begun under Frederik Birk, whose dismissal on 9 September 2025 was followed by the appointment of the Welshman Steve Cooper, Vanlerberghe found himself out of the squad by late September after the new coach moved to a two-centre-back system. Cooper described the decision as tactical, telling reporters that Vanlerberghe had "become surplus" to his preferred pairing of Frederik Alves and Luis Binks.

The club placed Vanlerberghe on the transfer list over the winter break. He did not travel to the first-team training camp in Spain and trained instead with the under-19 side, rejoining the squad in Portugal in late January 2026 after a proposed move had collapsed. Vanlerberghe made his first start of 2026 on 7 April, away to Nordsjælland in the championship round, in place of the suspended Binks; Brøndby lost 2–1. Cooper deployed him at right-back ten days later, in a 6–0 home win over Sønderjyske. On 17 May, Vanlerberghe started in a back three at Midtjylland as Brøndby came from 0–2 down to win 3–2 and secure fourth place in the Superliga. Four days later, he came on as an extra-tima substitute and scored a goal, that was controversially deemed off-side, as Brøndby lost the European play-off 3–1 at home to rivals Copenhagen, missing out on Conference League qualification.

== Career statistics ==
As of match played 25 August 2026

Appearances and goals by club, season and competition
Club	Season	League			National cup		Europe		Other		Total	
Club	Season	Division	Apps	Goals	Apps	Goals	Apps	Goals	Apps	Goals	Apps	Goals
Mechelen	2012–13	Pro League	1	0	0	0	—		0	0	1	0
Mechelen	2013–14	Pro League	6	1	0	0	—		0	0	6	1
Mechelen	2014–15	Pro League	2	0	1	0	—		0	0	3	0
Mechelen	2015–16	Pro League	16	0	2	0	—		0	0	18	0
Mechelen	2016–17	First Division A	22	2	0	0	—		—		22	2
Mechelen	Total		47	3	3	0	—		0	0	50	3
Club Brugge	2017–18	First Division A	7	0	1	0	0	0	—		8	0
Oostende (loan)	2018–19	First Division A	31	4	2	0	—		—		33	4
Mechelen (loan)	2019–20	First Division A	17	3	0	0	—		—		17	3
Mechelen	2020–21	First Division A	31	2	3	0	—		—		34	2
Mechelen	2021–22	First Division A	33	2	3	0	—		—		36	2
Mechelen	2022–23	Belgian Pro League	20	2	3	0	—		1 (Note: Appearances in Belgian Super Cup)	0	24	2
Mechelen	2023–24	Belgian Pro League	21	0	1	0	—		—		22	0
Mechelen	Total		122	9	10	0	—		1	0	133	9
Brøndby	2023–24	Danish Superliga	12	1	—		—		—		12	1
Brøndby	2024–25	Danish Superliga	22	2	6	0	1 (Note: Appearance(s) in UEFA Conference League)	0	—		29	2
Brøndby	2025–26	Danish Superliga	14	0	1	0	5	0	1 (Note: Appearance in Danish Superliga play-off)	0	21	0
Brøndby	2026–27	Danish Superliga	5	1	0	0	—		—		5	1
Brøndby	Total		53	4	7	0	6	0	1	0	67	4
Career total			260	20	23	0	6	0	2	0	291	20

== Honours ==
Club Brugge

- Belgian First Division A: 2017–18
