= Jules Houttequiet =

Belgian footballer (born 2002)

Personal information
- Date of birth: 5 September 2002 (age 24)
- Place of birth: Bornem, Belgium
- Position: Left winger

Team information
- Current team: Lebbeke
- Number: 62

Youth career
- –2014: Mechelen
- 2014–2020: Anderlecht
- 2020–2022: Mechelen

Senior career*
Years	Team	Apps	(Gls)
2021–2022	→ Helmond Sport (loan)	25	(1)
2022–2023	Jong Mechelen	18	(4)
2023–2026	Rupel Boom	83	(16)
2026–	Lebbeke	6	(0)
- * Club domestic league appearances and goals as of 13:05, 13 October 2026 (UTC)

Jules Houttequiet (born 5 September 2002) is a Belgian professional footballer who plays as a left winger for Belgian Division 2 club Lebbeke.

== Career ==
=== Mechelen ===
Houttequiet started his youth career with Mechelen before moving to the academy of Anderlecht. He returned to Mechelen in 2020.

==== Loan to Helmond Sport ====
On 8 August 2021, Houttequiet signed his first professional contract with Mechelen and was sent on loan to Dutch Eerste Divisie club Helmond Sport as part of the two clubs' partnership. He made his professional debut on 6 August 2021, the opening day of the 2021–22 Eerste Divisie season, where he was a starter at right wing, before being substituted off for Keyennu Lont in the second half of the 0–2 loss against FC Den Bosch at De Vliert. On 29 April 2022, he scored his first goal, which proved to be the winner in a 1–0 league victory against Jong AZ.

On 27 June 2022, Houttequiet's loan to Helmond Sport was extended for a second season. However, shortly after, before the 2022–23 season began, Houttequiet returned to Mechelen by the mutual agreement of two clubs.

==== Return to Mechelen ====
After Houttequiet's loan with Helmond Sport was terminated, he was included in the Mechelen under-23 team, Jong Mechelen, competing for the first time in the fourth-tier Belgian Division 2 in the 2022–23 season. He made his first appearance for the team on 3 September 2022, scoring a brace against Turnhout.

=== Rupel Boom ===
In July 2023, Houttequiet signed with Belgian Division 2 club Rupel Boom. He spent three seasons with the club, remaining a Rupel Boom player until the end of the 2025–26 campaign.

=== Lebbeke ===
In March 2026, fellow Belgian Division 2 club Lebbeke announced the signing of Houttequiet with effect from the 2026–27 season.

== Career statistics ==
As of match played 10 May 2026

Appearances and goals by club, season and competition
Club	Season	League			National cup		Other		Total	
Club	Season	Division	Apps	Goals	Apps	Goals	Apps	Goals	Apps	Goals
Helmond Sport (loan)	2021–22	Eerste Divisie	25	1	1	0	—		26	1
Jong Mechelen	2022–23	Belgian Division 2	18	4	—		—		18	4
Rupel Boom	2023–24	Belgian Division 2	28	3	1	0	1 (Note: Appearance(s) in Belgian Division 2 promotion play-offs)	0	30	3
Rupel Boom	2024–25	Belgian Division 2	25	5	0	0	1	0	26	5
Rupel Boom	2025–26	Belgian Division 2	30	8	1	0	2	0	33	8
Rupel Boom	Total		83	16	2	0	4	0	89	16
Career total			126	21	3	0	4	0	133	21
