= Joachim Van Damme =

Belgian footballer

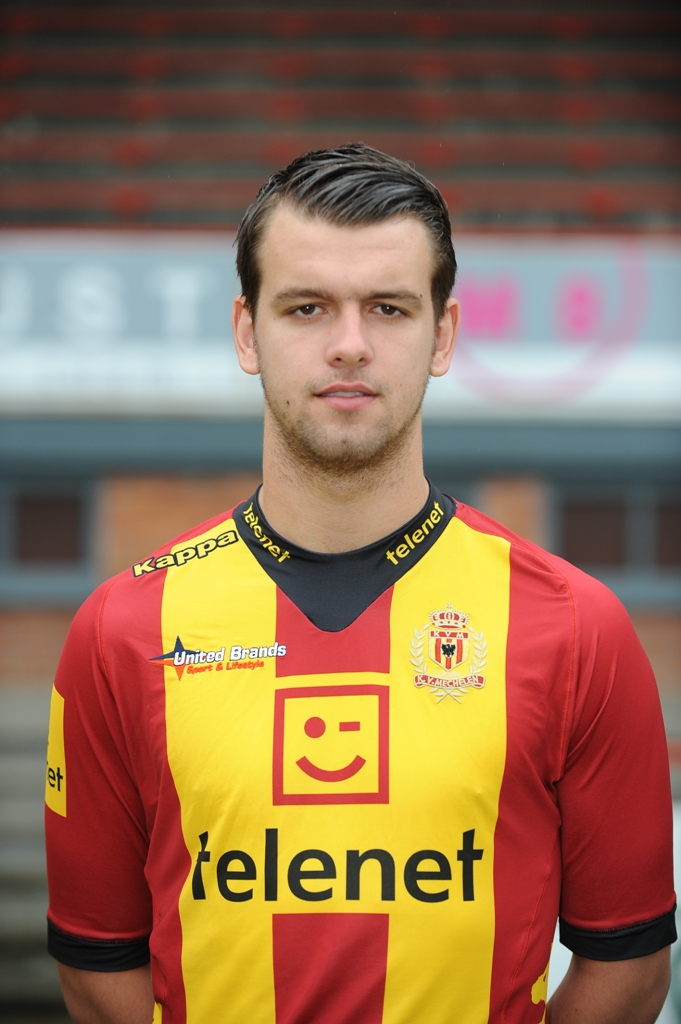
- Van Damme with Mechelen

Personal information
- Full name: Joachim Marc Van Damme
- Date of birth: 23 July 1991 (age 35)
- Place of birth: Beveren, Belgium
- Height: 1.95 m (6 ft 5 in)
- Positions: Defensive midfielder; centre-back

Team information
- Current team: Hamme
- Number: 13

Youth career
- –2008: KSK Beveren

Senior career*
| Years | Team | Apps | (Gls) |
| 2008–2012 | Waasland-Beveren | 83 | (10) |
| 2012–2016 | Mechelen | 60 | (4) |
| 2017–2018 | Waasland-Beveren | 14 | (1) |
| 2018–2022 | Mechelen | 71 | (10) |
| 2022–2023 | Standard Liège | 4 | (0) |
| 2022–2023 | → Beveren (loan) | 17 | (2) |
| 2024 | Zelzate | 12 | (2) |
| 2024– | Hamme | 24 | (10) |

International career
| 2010 | Belgium U19 | 3 | (1) |
- * Club domestic league appearances and goals as of 22 January 2026

Joachim Marc Van Damme (born 23 July 1991) is a Belgian professional footballer who plays as a defensive midfielder or centre-back for Hamme.

== Cocaine suspension ==
Van Damme tested positive for cocaine on 16 January 2016 and was suspended by the Flemish doping tribunal for two years, until 29 January 2018. KV Mechelen subsequently cancelled his contract. As a free player, his former club Waasland-Beveren offered him a contract in May 2017. End of November 2017, although still under suspension and unavailable to play for his club, Van Damme signed a contract extension at Waasland-Beveren keeping him at the club until June 2020.

On 11 January 2022, Van Damme moved to Standard Liège. On 19 August 2022, Van Damme returned to Beveren on a season-long loan. Van Damme's contract with Standard was terminated by mutual consent on 6 September 2023.

== Honours ==
Mechelen

- Belgian Cup: 2018–19
