= Gaëtan Coucke =

Belgian footballer (born 1998)

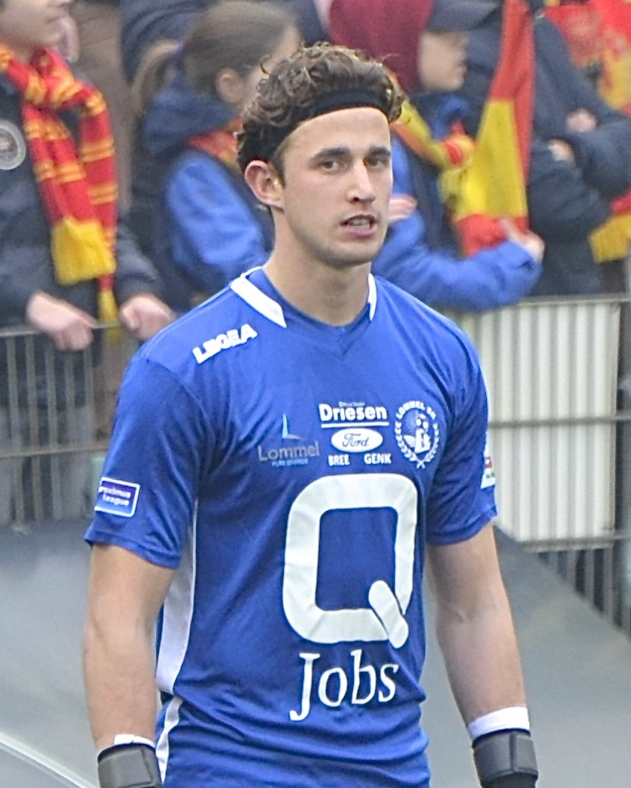
- Coucke in 2019

Personal information
- Full name: Gaëtan Coucke
- Date of birth: 3 November 1998 (age 28)
- Place of birth: Tongeren, Belgium
- Height: 1.87 m (6 ft 2 in)
- Position: Goalkeeper

Team information
- Current team: Cercle Brugge
- Number: 1

Youth career
- –2006: Vliermaal FC
- 2006–2016: Genk

Senior career*
Years	Team	Apps	(Gls)
2016–2020	Genk	18	(0)
2018–2019	→ Lommel (loan)	34	(0)
2020–2024	Mechelen	116	(0)
2024–2025	Al-Orobah	32	(0)
2025–2026	Sampdoria	2	(0)
2026–	Cercle Brugge	2	(0)

International career
2013	Belgium U16	1	(0)
2015	Belgium U17	6	(0)
2016	Belgium U19	1	(0)
- * Club domestic league appearances and goals as of 14 August 2026

Gaëtan Coucke (born 3 November 1998) is a Belgian professional footballer who plays as a goalkeeper for Belgian Pro League club Cercle Brugge.

== Club career ==
Coucke progressed from the youth team at Genk in 2006, having started at the club as a ball boy at the age of 8. He joined Lommel during the 2018–19 season on a one-year loan deal. On 1 July 2020 Coucke joined KV Mechelen after his contract at Genk was not extended.

On 12 August 2024, Coucke joined Saudi Pro League club Al-Orobah.

On 19 August 2025, Coucke moved to Sampdoria in Italy on a two-season deal.

On 10 July 2026, Coucke returned to Belgium and signed a three-year contract with Cercle Brugge.

== International career ==
Coucke was called up to the senior Belgium squad in November 2020, and was on the bench for the game against Denmark on 18 November.

== Career statistics ==
As of match played 26 May 2025

Appearances and goals by club, season and competition
Club	Season	League			National cup (Note: Includes Taça de Portugal, Coupe de France, FA Cup, Turkish Cup, King Cup)		Continental		Other		Total	
Club	Season	Division	Apps	Goals	Apps	Goals	Apps	Goals	Apps	Goals	Apps	Goals
Genk	2016–17	Belgian First Division A	0	0	0	0	0	0	0	0	0	0
Genk	2017–18	Belgian First Division A	0	0	0	0	—		—		0	0
Genk	2019–20	Belgian First Division A	18	0	0	0	5	0	0	0	23	0
Genk	Total		18	0	0	0	5	0	0	0	23	0
Lommel (loan)	2018–19	Belgian First Division B	34	0	6	0	—		—		40	0
Mechelen	2020–21	Belgian First Division A	16	0	3	0	—		—		19	0
Mechelen	2021–22	Belgian First Division A	35	0	1	0	—		—		36	0
Mechelen	2022–23	Belgian Pro League	29	0	3	0	—		—		32	0
Mechelen	2023–24	Belgian Pro League	36	0	1	0	—		—		37	0
Mechelen	Total		116	0	8	0	—		—		124	0
Al-Orobah	2024–25	Saudi Pro League	32	0	1	0	—		—		33	0
Career total			200	0	15	0	5	0	0	0	220	0

== Honours ==
Genk

- Belgian Super Cup: 2019
