= Gaétan Bosiers =

Belgian footballer (born 1999)

Personal information
- Full name: Gaétan Carina Alexander Bosiers
- Date of birth: 25 February 1999 (age 27)
- Place of birth: Wilrijk, Belgium
- Height: 1.80 m (5 ft 11 in)
- Position: Midfielder

Youth career
- 2012–2013: Beerschot
- 2013–2017: PSV
- 2017–2019: Mechelen

Senior career*
Years	Team	Apps	(Gls)
2019–2023	Mechelen	0	(0)
2020–2023	→ Helmond Sport (loan)	76	(2)
- * Club domestic league appearances and goals as of 21 June 2023

Gaétan Carina Alexander Bosiers (born 25 February 1999) is a Belgian professional footballer who plays as a midfielder.

== Professional career ==
Bosiers made his debut for Mechelen in the 2019 Belgian Super Cup, in a 3–0 loss to Genk.

He was sent on a season-long loan to Helmond Sport on 15 August 2020 as part of a new cooperation agreement between Mechelen and Helmond Sport. On 8 June 2021, the loan was extended by one season. On 15 June 2022, Bosiers' loan to Helmond Sport was extended for a third season.
