= Lucas Bijker =

Dutch footballer (born 1993)

Personal information
- Date of birth: 4 March 1993 (age 33)
- Place of birth: São Paulo, Brazil
- Height: 1.75 m (5 ft 9 in)
- Position: Left-back

Team information
- Current team: ONS Sneek

Youth career
- FVC
- Cambuur

Senior career*
Years	Team	Apps	(Gls)
2011–2015	Cambuur	85	(0)
2015–2017	Heerenveen	63	(0)
2017–2018	Cádiz	22	(0)
2018–2023	Mechelen	102	(0)
2023–2024	Ethnikos Achna	24	(3)
2025–	ONS Sneek		

International career
2013	Netherlands U21	2	(0)
- * Club domestic league appearances and goals as of 20 June 2024

Lucas Bijker (born 4 March 1993) is a Dutch retired footballer who played as a left-back.

== Club career ==
Born in São Paulo, Brazil, Bijker came through SC Cambuur's youth system and made his senior debut for them in November 2011. In the summer 2015 he joined arch rivals Heerenveen.

On 7 August 2017, Bijker signed a three-year contract with Spanish Segunda División club Cádiz CF, after impressing on a trial. He made his debut for the club on 19 August, starting in a 2–1 away win against Córdoba CF.

On 15 June 2018, Bijker was transferred to Belgian side KV Mechelen, with Cádiz retaining 15% of a future transfer. He signed a three-year contract with the club.

== Personal life ==
In July 2013 Bijker was sentenced to 20 hours community service after he was found guilty of violently harassing two young women and a former teammate. After retiring professionally at Cypriot side Ethnikos Achna, he started working for the Heerenveen municipality while joining amateur side ONS Sneek.

== Honours ==
Cambuur

- Eerste Divisie: 2012–13

Mechelen

- Belgian Cup: 2018–19
