= Rob Schoofs =

Belgian footballer

Personal information
- Date of birth: 23 March 1994 (age 32)
- Place of birth: Sint-Truiden, Belgium
- Height: 1.78 m (5 ft 10 in)
- Position: Central midfielder

Team information
- Current team: Union Saint-Gilloise
- Number: 17

Senior career*
Years	Team	Apps	(Gls)
2010–2016	Sint-Truiden	104	(9)
2016–2017	Gent	19	(1)
2017–2025	KV Mechelen	260	(42)
2025–	Union Saint-Gilloise	37	(2)

International career
2010	Belgium U16	3	(1)
2010	Belgium U17	2	(0)
2012–2013	Belgium U19	10	(0)
2016	Belgium U21	1	(0)
- * Club domestic league appearances and goals as of 20 September 2026

Rob Schoofs (born 23 March 1994) is a Belgian professional footballer who plays as a central midfielder for Belgian Pro League club Union SG.

== Club career ==
Schoofs was Gent's then record signing in the summer of 2017, but only stayed there for one season.

In 2018, Schoofs moved to newly relegated Mechelen, helping them in his first season at the club to promotion and Cup success, becoming only the second club from outside the top flight in history to win the Belgian Cup. They were the first club to do this double.

On 1 September 2025, Schoofs signed a three-year contract with Union SG.

== Career statistics ==
As of match played 20 September 2026

Appearances and goals by club, season and competition
Club	Season	League			Belgian Cup		Europe		Other		Total	
Club	Season	Division	Apps	Goals	Apps	Goals	Apps	Goals	Apps	Goals	Apps	Goals
Sint-Truiden	2010–11	Belgian Pro League	1	0	—		—		1	0	2	0
Sint-Truiden	2011–12	Belgian Pro League	8	0	—		—		1 (Note: Appearance in relegation play-offs)	0	9	0
Sint-Truiden	2012–13	Belgian Pro League	22	0	4	0	—		—		26	0
Sint-Truiden	2013–14	Belgian Pro League	19	3	0	0	—		5	2	24	5
Sint-Truiden	2014–15	Challenger Pro League	31	4	2	0	—		—		33	4
Sint-Truiden	2015–16	Belgian Pro League	23	2	2	0	—		—		25	2
Sint-Truiden	Total		104	9	8	0	—		7	2	119	11
Gent	2015–16	Belgian Pro League	5	0	0	0	0	0	—		5	0
Gent	2016–17	Belgian Pro League	14	1	2	1	2 (Note: Appearances in UEFA Europa League)	0	—		18	2
Gent	Total		19	1	2	1	2	0	0	0	23	2
Mechelen	2017–18	Belgian Pro League	21	2	1	0	—		—		22	2
Mechelen	2018–19	Challenger Pro League	29	5	6	0	—		—		35	5
Mechelen	2019–20	Belgian Pro League	26	3	0	0	—		1 (Note: Appearance in Belgian Super Cup)	0	27	3
Mechelen	2020–21	Belgian Pro League	40	6	3	1	—		—		43	7
Mechelen	2021–22	Belgian Pro League	35	4	2	0	—		—		37	4
Mechelen	2022–23	Belgian Pro League	27	7	6	1	—		—		33	8
Mechelen	2023–24	Belgian Pro League	38	7	0	0	—		1	0	39	7
Mechelen	2024–25	Belgian Pro League	38	6	2	0	—		—		40	6
Mechelen	2025–26	Belgian Pro League	9	2	1	0	—		—		10	2
Mechelen	Total		263	42	21	2	—		2	0	286	44
Union SG	2025–26	Belgian Pro League	30	2	5	0	7 (Note: Appearances in UEFA Champions League)	0	—		42	2
Union SG	2026–27	Belgian Pro League	7	0	0	0	3 (Note: Two appearances in UEFA Champions League, one appearance in UEFA Europa League)	0	0	0	10	0
Union SG	Total		37	2	5	0	10	0	0	0	52	2
Career total			423	54	36	3	12	0	9	2	480	59

== Honours ==
Mechelen

- Belgian First Division B: 2018–19
- Belgian Cup: 2018–19

Union SG

- Belgian Cup: 2025–26
