= Thibault Peyre =

French footballer (born 1992)

Personal information
- Date of birth: 3 October 1992 (age 34)
- Place of birth: Martigues, France
- Height: 1.82 m (6 ft 0 in)
- Position: Defender

Team information
- Current team: Al-Jandal
- Number: 23

Senior career*
Years	Team	Apps	(Gls)
2012–2013	Toulouse B	22	(1)
2013–2014	Lille B	9	(0)
2014–2017	Royal Mouscron-Péruwelz	73	(3)
2017–2019	Union SG	48	(4)
2019–2023	KV Mechelen	103	(5)
2023–2025	Al-Batin	66	(5)
2025–	Al-Jandal	0	(0)
- * Club domestic league appearances and goals as of 13:14, 7 January 2023 (UTC)

Thibault Peyre (born 3 October 1992) is a French professional footballer who plays as a defender for Al-Jandal in the Saudi First Division League.

== Career ==
In January 2019, Peyre moved to KV Mechelen.

On 6 January 2023, he joined Saudi Arabian club Al-Batin.

On 9 August 2025, Peyre joined Al-Jandal.

== Honours ==
Mechelen

- Belgian Cup: 2018–19
