= David Bates (footballer) =

Scottish footballer

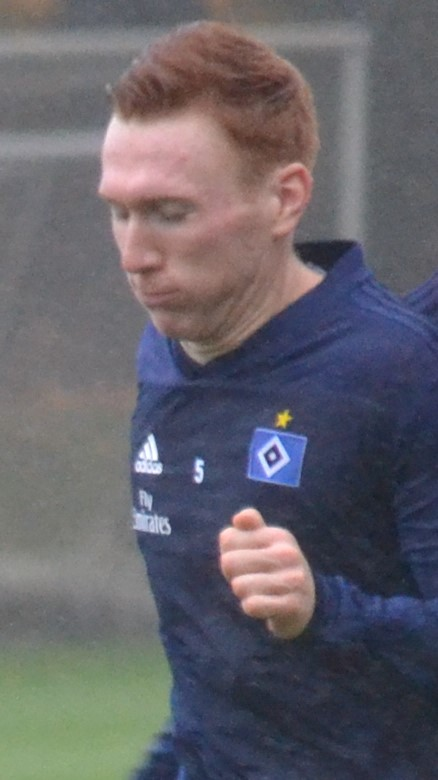
- Bates with Hamburger SV in 2018

Personal information
- Full name: David Robert Bates
- Date of birth: 5 October 1996 (age 30)
- Place of birth: Kirkcaldy, Fife, Scotland
- Height: 1.93 m (6 ft 4 in)
- Position: Centre-back

Team information
- Current team: Amedspor
- Number: 34

Youth career
- Raith Rovers

Senior career*
Years	Team	Apps	(Gls)
2013–2017	Raith Rovers	10	(0)
2015	→ East Stirlingshire (loan)	17	(1)
2015	→ Brechin City (loan)	10	(1)
2016–2017	→ Rangers (loan)	0	(0)
2017–2018	Rangers	22	(1)
2018–2021	Hamburger SV	25	(1)
2019–2020	→ Sheffield Wednesday (loan)	0	(0)
2020–2021	→ Cercle Brugge (loan)	19	(0)
2021–2022	Aberdeen	33	(2)
2022–2024	Mechelen	60	(4)
2024–2026	Standard Liège	27	(1)
2026–	Amedspor	11	(0)

International career^{‡}
2018	Scotland U21	4	(0)
2018–	Scotland	4	(0)
- * Club domestic league appearances and goals as of 13:50, 11 November 2026 (UTC) ‡ National team caps and goals as of 08:58, 19 April 2019 (UTC)

David Robert Bates (born 5 October 1996) is a Scottish professional footballer who plays as a centre-back for Süper Lig club Amedspor and the Scotland national team.

He has previously played for Raith Rovers, East Stirlingshire, Brechin City, Rangers, Hamburg, Cercle Brugge, Sheffield Wednesday, Aberdeen, Mechelen and Standard Liège.

Bates has been capped four times at full international level by Scotland.

== Club career ==
=== Raith Rovers ===
Born in Kirkcaldy, Bates began his career at his hometown club Raith Rovers. He was first included in a matchday squad on 21 September 2013, remaining an unused substitute in their 4–2 Scottish Championship home win over Alloa Athletic. He was again unused in 13 more league games and two Scottish Challenge Cup fixtures.

In January 2015, Bates was loaned to Scottish League Two team East Stirlingshire for the remainder of the campaign. He made his debut on 3 January, playing the full 90 minutes of a 3–0 loss at Berwick Rangers. Two weeks later, he received a straight red card in a 3–1 home defeat to Annan Athletic. He made 17 appearances in all for the Shire; in his last one he headed the first goal of his career as they finished the season with a 5–1 loss to Albion Rovers at Ochilview Park.

On 25 July 2015, Bates made his first appearance for Raith, playing the entirety of a 1–0 win at Cowdenbeath in the first round of the Challenge Cup. On 8 August, he played his first league game, a 3–0 win over Livingston at Stark's Park on the first day of the Championship season. On 11 September 2015, Bates moved on loan to Brechin City in Scottish League One until 12 December 2015.

=== Rangers ===
On 5 August 2016, Bates moved on a development loan to Rangers until January 2017. At the end of his loan, Bates moved on a permanent basis to Rangers. He made his debut for Rangers in a Scottish Premiership match against Kilmarnock on 6 April 2017, starting at centre-back. Bates made his European debut in the opening game of Rangers' 2017–18 season against Progrès Niederkorn on 29 June 2017.

=== Hamburger SV ===
On 12 April 2018, Hamburger SV announced the signing of Bates on a four-year contract after his contract expired with Rangers in the summer of 2018. By February 2019 he was described as a "favourite" at the club, having started in 13 of 20 Hamburg's league games. Football writer Daniel Busch commented that Bates "plays like a 'no-nonsense centre-back' and already has strong physical attributes. Having improved his passing so quickly, he will further improve and become a more rounded player". In May 2019, he suffered a ligament part rupture in his left ankle during the away game against SC Paderborn 07, effectively ending his season.

On 8 August 2019, Bates signed for Sheffield Wednesday on a season-long loan. After starting only one match in the Owls' 1-0 EFL Cup victory over Rotherham United, he suffered a hip flexor injury that ruled him out for an extended period.

On 7 August 2020, Bates signed a season-long loan for Cercle Brugge.

=== Aberdeen ===
Bates returned to Scotland in August 2021, signing a three-year contract with Aberdeen.

=== Mechelen ===
After one season with Aberdeen, Bates signed a three-year contract with Belgian club K.V. Mechelen on 1 September 2022.

=== Standard Liège ===
On 24 July 2024, Bates moved to Standard Liège on a three-year contract.

=== Amedspor ===
On 26 June 2026, Bates signed with Amedspor in Turkey for two years, with an optional third year.

== International career ==
Bates was selected for the Scotland under-21 team in September 2018. He made four appearances for the under-21 team, all in the early part of the 2018–19 season. Bates was then called into the full Scotland squad in November 2018, and he made his international debut in a 4–0 win against Albania on 17 November. In November 2026, Bates was called-up to the Scotland squad for the first time in seven years for matches against North Macedonia and Switzerland.

== Career statistics ==
=== Club ===
As of match played 23 April 2023

Appearances and goals by club, season and competition
Club	Season	League			National cup (Note: Includes Scottish Cup, DFB-Pokal, Belgian Cup)		League cup (Note: Includes Scottish League Cup, EFL Cup)		Europe		Other		Total	
Club	Season	Division	Apps	Goals	Apps	Goals	Apps	Goals	Apps	Goals	Apps	Goals	Apps	Goals
Raith Rovers	2013–14	Scottish Championship	0	0	0	0	0	0	—		0	0	0	0
Raith Rovers	2014–15	Scottish Championship	0	0	0	0	0	0	—		0	0	0	0
Raith Rovers	2015–16	Scottish Championship	10	0	2	0	1	0	—		2 (Note: Appearances in Scottish Challenge Cup)	0	15	0
Raith Rovers	Total		10	0	2	0	1	0	0	0	2	0	15	0
East Stirlingshire (loan)	2014–15	Scottish League Two	17	1	0	0	0	0	—		0	0	17	1
Brechin City (loan)	2015–16	Scottish League One	10	1	0	0	0	0	—		0	0	10	1
Rangers	2016–17	Scottish Premiership	7	0	1	0	0	0	—		—		8	0
Rangers	2017–18	Scottish Premiership	15	1	3	0	0	0	2 (Note: Appearances in UEFA Europa League)	0	—		20	1
Rangers	Total		22	1	4	0	0	0	2	0	0	0	28	1
Hamburger SV	2018–19	2. Bundesliga	25	1	3	0	—		—		—		28	1
Hamburger SV	2019–20	2. Bundesliga	0	0	0	0	—		—		—		0	0
Hamburger SV	2020–21	2. Bundesliga	0	0	0	0	—		—		—		0	0
Hamburger SV	Total		25	1	3	0	0	0	0	0	0	0	28	1
Sheffield Wednesday (loan)	2019–20	EFL Championship	0	0	0	0	1	0	—		—		1	0
Cercle Brugge (loan)	2020–21	Belgian Pro League	19	0	2	0	—		—		—		21	0
Aberdeen	2021–22	Scottish Premiership	33	2	2	0	0	0	0	0	—		28	1
Mechelen	2022–23	Belgian Pro League	25	2	5	1	—		—		—		30	3
Career total			154	7	18	1	2	0	2	0	2	0	178	8

=== International ===
As of match played 24 March 2019

Appearances and goals by national team and year
National team	Year	Apps	Goals
Scotland	2018	2	0
Scotland	2019	2	0
Total		4	0
