= Achter de Kazerne =

Football stadium in Mechelen, Belgium

Coordinates: 51°02′14″N 4°29′11″E

- Achter de Kazerne
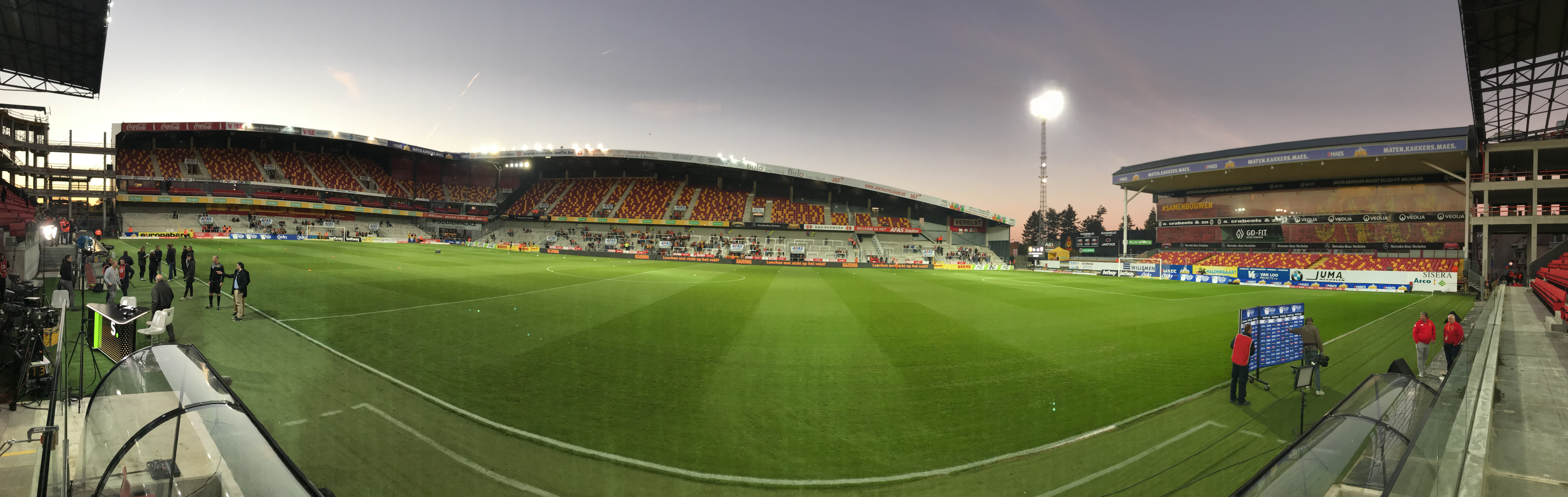
- Achter de Kazerne in 2018
- Interactive map of Achter de Kazerne
- Location: Kleine Nieuwedijk 53, Mechelen, Belgium
- Capacity: 16,672

Construction
- Renovated: 2015–2020

Tenant
- KV Mechelen

Achter de Kazerne is a football stadium in Mechelen, Belgium. It is used for football matches and is the home ground of KV Mechelen. Currently, the ground has a capacity of 16,672. The stadium is called Achter de Kazerne, which means "Behind the Army Barracks". It is called this because the stadium was once located behind an army base.

In the past it was called Scarletstadion (2003–2006) after the stadium's sponsor Scarlet. It was the first commercialised stadium name in Belgium. After this, Veolia took over the deal (2006–2009) followed by Argos Oil until May 2015. AFAS Software started with a sponsorship deal and was the name-holder of Achter de Kazerne until 2025. A major reconstruction of the stadium started in 2015 and finished in 2020.

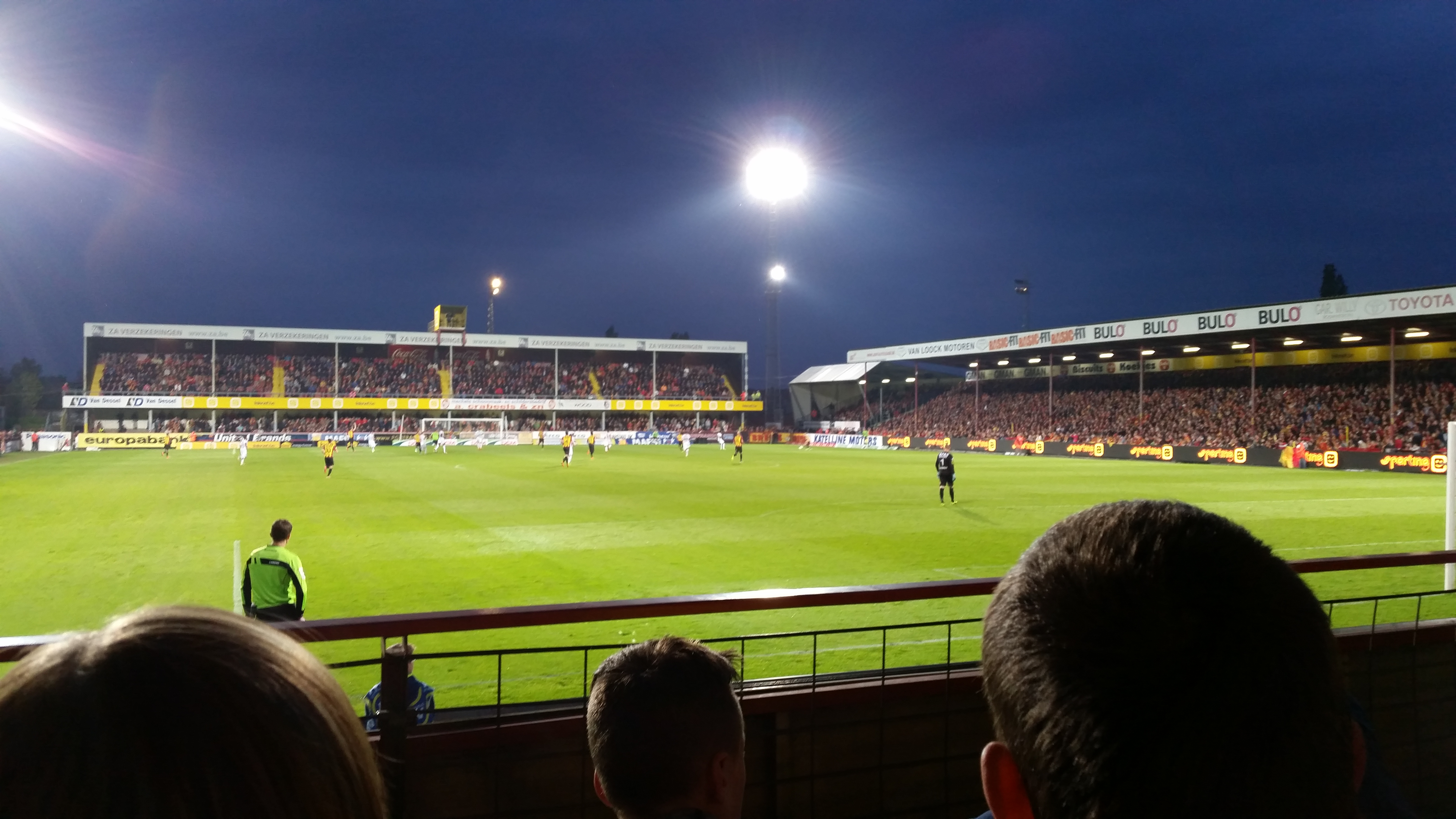
Achter De Kazerne Oud
