= Geoffry Hairemans =

Belgian footballer

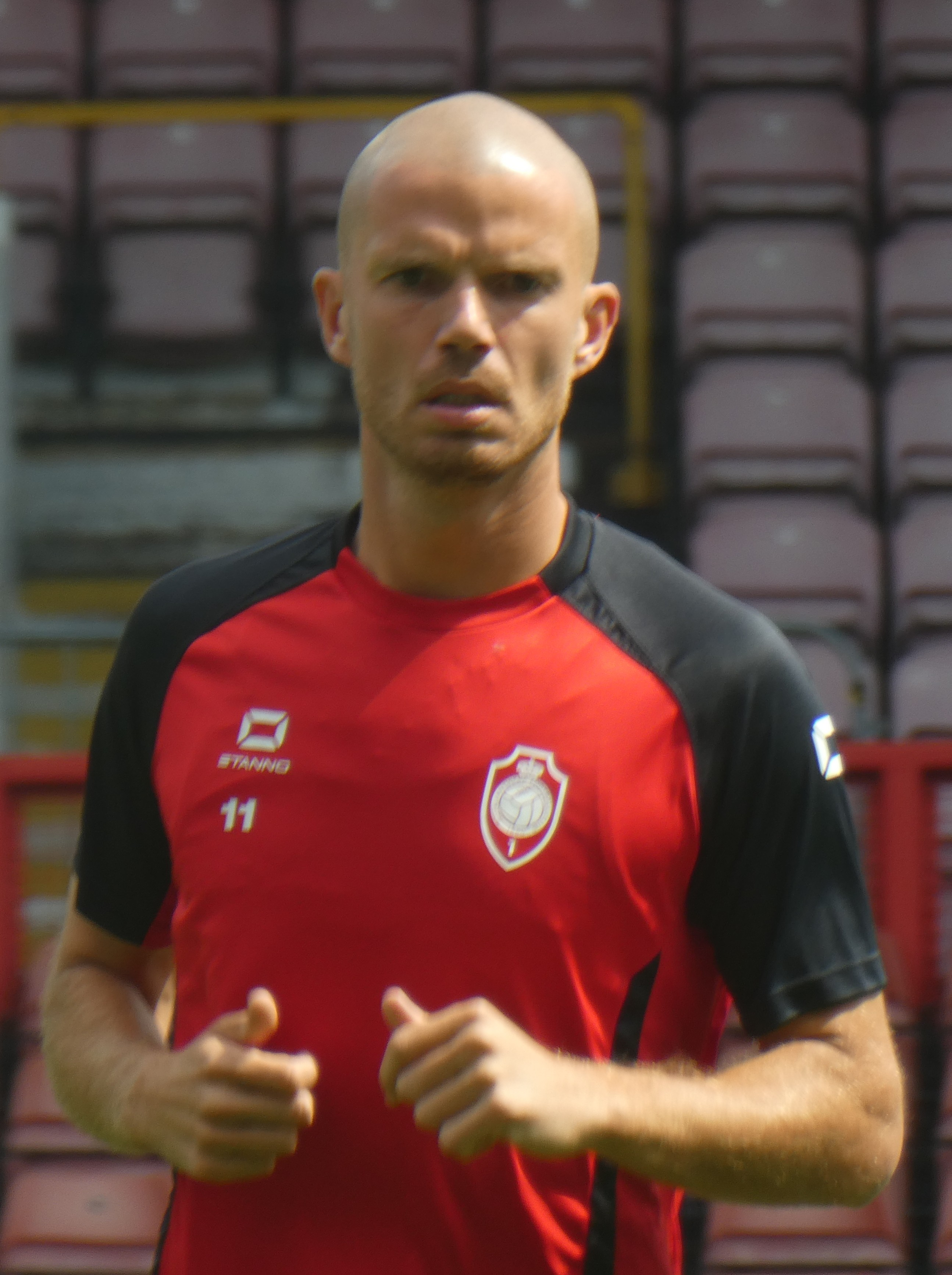

Personal information
- Date of birth: 21 October 1991 (age 35)
- Place of birth: Wilrijk, Belgium
- Height: 1.84 m (6 ft 0 in)
- Position: Midfielder

Team information
- Current team: Hasselt
- Number: 7

Youth career
- 2001–2006: Rapid Deurne
- 2006–2007: Tubantia Borgerhout
- 2007–2008: Royal Antwerp

Senior career*
Years	Team	Apps	(Gls)
2008–2010	Royal Antwerp	14	(1)
2010–2011	De Graafschap	11	(1)
2012–2014	Lierse	15	(0)
2013–2014	→ KV Turnhout (loan)	37	(8)
2014–2015	Heist	29	(4)
2015–2019	Royal Antwerp	113	(12)
2019–2025	Mechelen	189	(31)
2025–2026	Antwerp	6	(0)
2026–	Hasselt	2	(0)
- * Club domestic league appearances and goals as of 19 September 2026

Geoffry Hairemans (born 21 October 1991) is a Belgian professional footballer who plays as a midfielder for Hasselt in the Challenger Pro League.

== Career ==
Hairemans joined Eerste Divisie side De Graafschap on 22 January 2010, and after spells with Lierse, Turnhout and Heist, he returned to his childhood team Antwerp for the 2015 season.

On 2 September 2019, Hairemans signed a three-year contract with K.V. Mechelen. On 25 November 2021, he extended his contract at K.V. Mechelen till 2025.

== Career statistics ==
As of 30 January 2018

Appearances and goals by club, season and competition
Club	Season	League			Cup		Other		Total	
Club	Season	Division	Apps	Goals	Apps	Goals	Apps	Goals	Apps	Goals
Antwerp	2008–09	Belgian Second Division	1	0	0	0	0	0	1	0
Antwerp	2009–10	Belgian Second Division	13	1	2	0	0	0	15	1
Antwerp	Total		14	1	2	0	0	0	16	1
De Graafschap	2009–10	Eerste Divisie	4	1	0	0	0	0	4	1
De Graafschap	2010–11	Eredivisie	5	0	1	0	0	0	6	0
De Graafschap	2011–12	Eredivisie	2	0	0	0	0	0	2	0
De Graafschap	Total		11	1	1	0	0	0	12	1
Lierse	2011–12	Belgian Pro League	5	0	1	0	0	0	6	0
Lierse	2012–13	Belgian Pro League	10	0	0	0	0	0	10	0
Lierse	2013–14	Belgian Pro League	0	0	0	0	0	0	0	0
Lierse	Total		15	0	1	0	0	0	16	0
Turnhout (loan)	2012–13	Belgian Third Division	11	3	0	0	0	0	11	3
Turnhout (loan)	2013–14	Belgian Third Division	26	5	0	0	2 (Note: Appearances in Promotion play-offs)	1	28	6
Heist	2014–15	Belgian Second Division	29	4	1	0	0	0	30	4
Antwerp	2015–16	Belgian Second Division	28	6	3	1	0	0	31	7
Antwerp	2016–17	Belgian First Division B	23	2	2	0	0	0	25	2
Antwerp	2017–18	Belgian First Division A	22	3	1	0	0	0	23	3
Antwerp	Total		73	11	6	1	0	0	79	12
Career total			179	24	11	1	2	1	192	26
