= Yannick Thoelen =

Belgian footballer

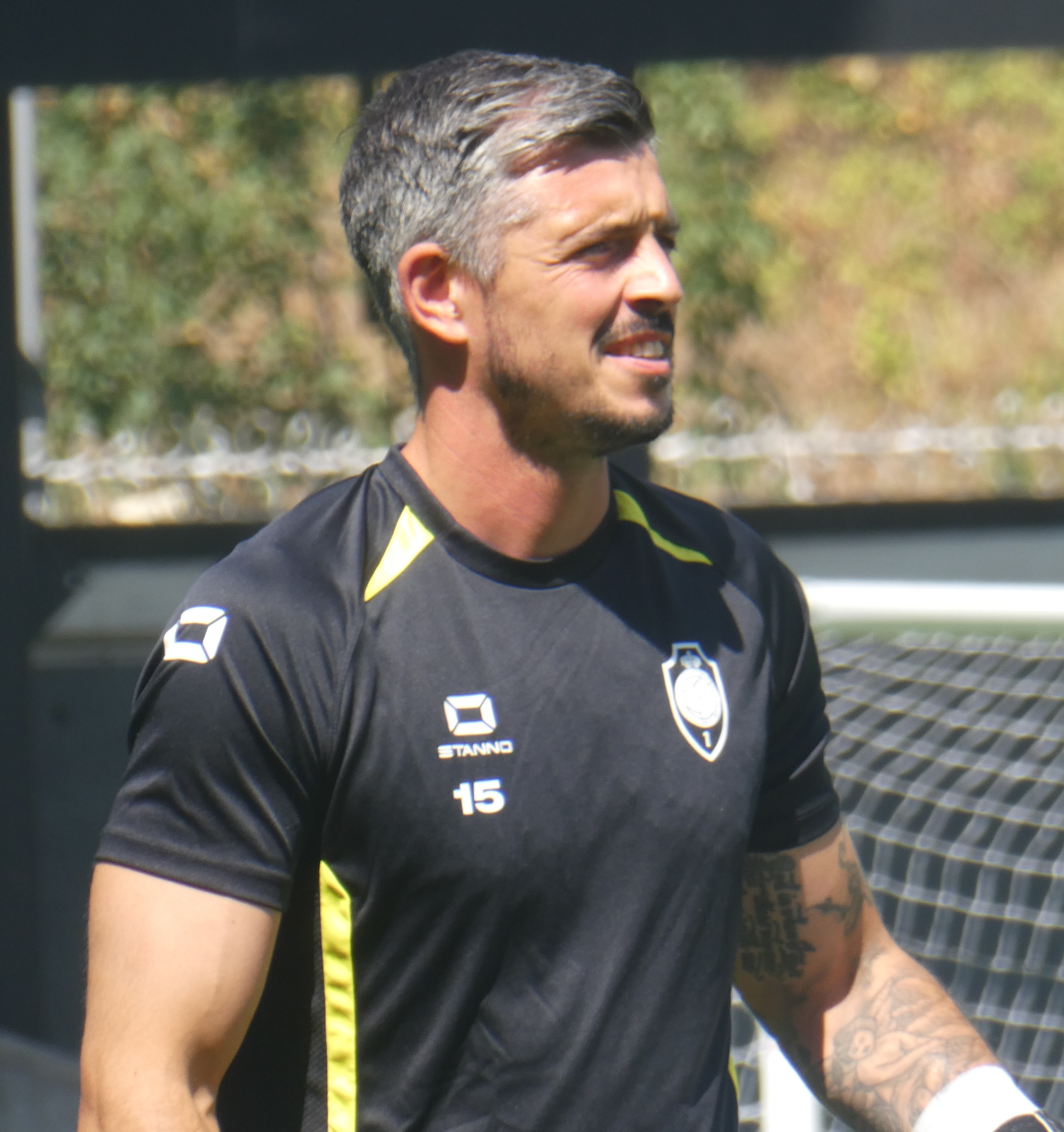

Personal information
- Date of birth: 18 July 1990 (age 36)
- Place of birth: Tessenderlo, Belgium
- Height: 1.88 m (6 ft 2 in)
- Position: Goalkeeper

Team information
- Current team: Antwerp
- Number: 15

Youth career
- Geel

Senior career*
Years	Team	Apps	(Gls)
2007–2008	Geel	8	(0)
2008–2012	Mechelen	2	(0)
2011–2012	→ Lommel United (loan)	34	(0)
2012–2015	Lommel United	96	(0)
2015–2019	Gent	19	(0)
2019–2025	Mechelen	61	(0)
2025–	Antwerp	7	(0)
- * Club domestic league appearances and goals as of 11 February 2026

Yannick Thoelen (born 18 July 1990) is a Belgian footballer who plays as a goalkeeper for Antwerp in the Belgian Pro League.

== Career ==
On 24 July 2019, he returned to Mechelen, signing a 3-year contract.

On 30 January 2025, Thoelen signed a contract with Antwerp for one and a half years, with an additional one-year extension option.
