= Kerim Mrabti =

Swedish footballer (born 1994)

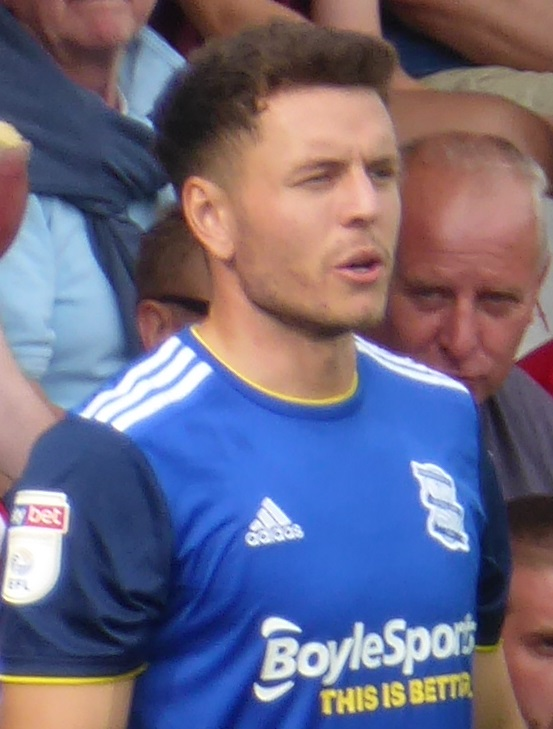
- Mrabti with Birmingham City in 2019

Personal information
- Full name: Abdallah Kerim Mrabti
- Date of birth: 20 May 1994 (age 32)
- Place of birth: Nacka, Sweden
- Height: 1.75 m (5 ft 9 in)
- Positions: Midfielder; striker

Team information
- Current team: AEK Larnaca

Youth career
- 1999–2010: Enköpings SK

Senior career*
Years	Team	Apps	(Gls)
2011–2012	Enköpings SK	26	(6)
2013–2014	IK Sirius	45	(5)
2015–2018	Djurgårdens IF	77	(18)
2019–2020	Birmingham City	27	(3)
2020–2026	Mechelen	191	(33)
2026–	AEK Larnaca	0	(0)

International career^{‡}
2011–2013	Sweden U19	4	(0)
2014–2017	Sweden U21	17	(5)
2016–2018	Sweden	3	(0)
- * Club domestic league appearances and goals as of 31 May 2026 ‡ National team caps and goals as of 08:58, 18 August 2020 (UTC)

Abdallah Kerim Mrabti (Arabic: كريم عبدالله مرابطي; born 20 May 1994) is a Swedish professional footballer who plays as a midfielder for Cypriot First Division club AEK Larnaca.

He began his career with Enköpings SK, and moved on to for IK Sirius and Djurgårdens IF, with whom he won the 2017–18 Svenska Cupen. In January 2019, he joined English EFL Championship (second-tier) club Birmingham City on an 18-month contract, and signed for KV Mechelen in August 2020. He made his senior international debut for Sweden in 2016.

== Career ==
Mrabti was born in Stockholm and moved to Enköping as a five-year-old. He started out playing for the local club Enköpings SK. At 17 he played a big part in Enköping winning their fourth tier league and getting promoted. After the following season had ended in November 2012 he trialed with Uppsala-based club IK Sirius and impressed enough to be signed on a two-year deal.

After two seasons with IK Sirius, one in the third tier and the next in the second-tier Superettan, Mrabti was sold to Allsvenskan club Djurgårdens IF in early 2015 for 600,000–700,000 SEK. On 25 May Mrabti scored his first two goals for Djurgården in the Tvillingderby against local rival AIK in front of 27,137 people at the Tele2 Arena in a game which ended 2–2. At the end of the 2015 Allsvenskan season he received the player of the year award by the club's supporter group Järnkaminerna as well as the award for best newcomer of the year in the entire league. Ahead of the new season in 2017 Mrabti was handed the number 10 shirt. On 10 May 2018 he scored as Djurgården beat Malmö FF 3–0 in the Swedish Cup Final.

He left the club at the end of the season, and on 18 January 2019, signed an 18-month contract on a free deal with Birmingham City of the EFL Championship, the second tier of football in England. Always in or around the first team but never a regular in the starting eleven, Mrabti made 27 appearances in all competitions (18 league starts) and scored three goals. The arrival of Scott Hogan in January 2020 and the season interrupted by the COVID-19 pandemic further restricted his opportunities, and he left the club when his contract expired in June 2020.

After training with his former club, Djurgården, Mrabti signed a three-year contract with KV Mechelen of the Belgian First Division A.

On 5 August 2026, Mrabti moved to AEK Larnaca in Cyprus on a two-season deal.

== International career ==
Mrabti represented Sweden at under-19 and under-21 levels. In January 2016 he suffered an ACL injury only 25 minutes into his senior debut for Sweden against Estonia. Mrabti was expected to back in full training in September later that year. He was included in Sweden's squad in December 2017.

Despite his having played for Sweden in friendly matches, Tunisia were keen to add him to their 2018 World Cup squad. On 13 May 2018 Mrabti announced he had turned down the opportunity. He was called into Sweden's squad in December 2018.

== Personal life ==
Mrabti's father is Tunisian while his mother is half Swedish and half Finnish. He first became a Djurgårdens IF supporter after attending the 2003–04 UEFA Champions League qualifier against FK Partizan and he also visited their training ground to collect autographs from the players. In November 2016 Mrabti said in the Fan-TV show "08 Fotboll" that his dream was to one day play in the German Bundesliga.

== Career statistics ==
=== International ===
As of 1 June 2022

Appearances and goals by national team and year
National team	Year	Apps	Goals
Sweden	2016	1	0
Sweden	2017	0	0
Sweden	2018	2	0
Total		3	0

== Honours ==
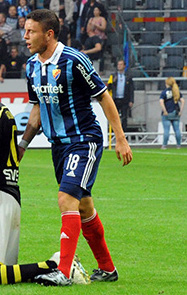
Mrabti playing for Djurgårdens IF in 2015

Djurgårdens IF

- Svenska Cupen: 2017–18

Individual

- Allsvenskan newcomer of the year: 2015
- Årets Järnkamin: 2015
