= 2024–25 Royal Antwerp FC season =

Royal Antwerp
2024–25 season
- Manager: Andries Ulderink
- Stadium: Bosuilstadion
- Pro League: 5th
- Belgian Cup: Semi-finals
- Top goalscorer: League: Tjaronn Chery (14); All: Tjaronn Chery (18)
- Average home league attendance: 13,196

The 2024–25 season was Royal Antwerp Football Club's 145th season in existence and eighth consecutive in the Belgian Pro League. They also competed in the Belgian Cup.

== Players ==
=== First-team squad ===
As of 3 February 2025

Note: Flags indicate national team as defined under FIFA eligibility rules; some limited exceptions apply. Players may hold more than one non-FIFA nationality.

No.	Pos.	Nation	Player
2	DF	BEL	Kobe Corbanie
3	DF	BEL	Björn Engels
4	MF	NED	Jaïro Riedewald
5	DF	BEL	Olivier Deman (on loan from SV Werder Bremen)
6	DF	GHA	Denis Odoi
7	FW	SUR	Gyrano Kerk (on loan from Lokomotiv Moscow)
8	MF	BEL	Dennis Praet
9	MF	SUR	Tjaronn Chery
10	FW	BEL	Michel-Ange Balikwisha
11	FW	ENG	Kadan Young (on loan from Aston Villa F.C.)
16	MF	ARG	Mauricio Benítez (on loan from Boca Juniors)
18	FW	NED	Vincent Janssen
20	MF	MLI	Mahamadou Doumbia

No.	Pos.	Nation	Player
22	MF	CIV	Farouck Adekami
23	DF	BEL	Toby Alderweireld (captain)
25	DF	BEL	Jelle Bataille
26	DF	BUL	Rosen Bozhinov
27	FW	GUI	Mohamed Bayo (on loan from Lille OSC)
27	MF	BEL	Mandela Keita
30	MF	GER	Christopher Scott
33	DF	BEL	Zeno Van Den Bosch
43	MF	MAR	Youssef Hamdaoui
46	MF	BEL	Milan Smits
55	FW	ECU	Anthony Valencia
91	GK	BEL	Senne Lammens
—	GK	BEL	Yannick Thoelen

== Transfers ==
=== In ===
Pos.	Player	Transferred from	Fee	Date	Source
FW	(England) Kadan Young	(England) Aston Villa F.C.	On loan	3 February 2025	
FW	(Guinea) Mohamed Bayo	(France) Lille OSC	On loan	3 February 2025	
MF	(Argentina) Mauricio Benítez	(Argentina) Boca Juniors	On loan	2 February 2025	
GK	(Belgium) Yannick Thoelen	(Belgium) K.V. Mechelen	Free	30 January 2025	
DF	(Belgium) Olivier Deman	(Germany) SV Werder Bremen	On loan	6 January 2025	
MF	(Belgium) Dennis Praet	(England) Leicester City	Free	6 September 2024	
MF	(Netherlands) Jaïro Riedewald	(England) Crystal Palace	Free	13 August 2024	
MF	(Ivory Coast) Farouck Adekami	(Ghana) Right to Dream Academy	Undisclosed	8 August 2024	
FW	(Suriname) Gyrano Kerk	(Russia) FC Lokomotiv Moscow	On loan	1 July 2024	
DF	(Belgium) Denis Odoi	(Belgium) Club Brugge	Free	26 June 2024	
DF	(Argentina) Ayrton Costa	(Argentina) Club Atlético Independiente	Undisclosed	2 July 2024	
DF	(Bulgaria) Rosen Bozhinov	(Bulgaria) CSKA 1948 Sofia	Undisclosed	21 June 2024	
MF	(Netherlands) Tjaronn Chery	(Israel) Maccabi Haifa	Undisclosed	26 May 2024	

=== Out ===
Pos.	Player	Transferred to	Fee	Date	Source
FW	(Nigeria) Victor Udoh	(England) Southampton	Undisclosed	3 February 2025	
FW	(Sweden) Jacob Ondrejka	(Italy) Parma Calcio	€ 7,000,000	23 January 2025	
DF	(Argentina) Ayrton Costa	(Argentina) Boca Juniors	€ 3,400,000	16 January 2025	
GK	(France) Jean Butez	(Italy) Como 1907	€ 2,000,000	7 January 2025	
DF	(Kosovo) Laurit Krasniqi	(Lithuania) FK Panevėžys	Free	5 January 2025	
MF	(Belgium) Mandela Keita	(Italy) Parma Calcio	€ 15,000,000	30 August 2024	
MF	(Belgium) Pierre Dwomoh	(England) Watford	€ 1,000,000	26 August 2024	
MF	(Nigeria) Alhassan Yusuf	(United States) New England Revolution	€ 2,300,000	12 August 2024	
MF	(Netherlands) Jurgen Ekkelenkamp	(Italy) Udinese Calcio	€ 5,500,000	6 August 2024	
FW	(Nigeria) George Ilenikhena	(France) AS Monaco	€ 18,750,000	24 July 2024	
DF	(Belgium) Dorian Dessoleil	(Belgium) Francs Borains	End of contract	30 June 2024	
DF	(Belgium) Ritchie De Laet		Retired	30 June 2024	
GK	(Belgium) Davino Verhulst		Retired	30 June 2024	

== Pre-season and friendlies ==
The team will start preparations with a test match versus third-tier side Hoogstraten VV on 29 June behind closed doors.

29 June 2024 Friendly	Antwerp (Belgium)	2–0	(Belgium) Hoogstraten VV	Antwerp, Belgium
	Vandeplas 19'; Ilenikhena 58'			Stadium: Bosuilstadion; Attendance: 0

6 July 2024 Friendly	Antwerp (Belgium)	2–1	(Belgium) K.V. Mechelen	Antwerp, Belgium
	Smits; Ekkelenkamp		Lauberbach	Stadium: Bosuilstadion; Attendance: 0
Note: Four periods of 30 minutes.

11 July 2023 Friendly	SGV Reichenau (Austria)	0–2	(Belgium) Antwerp	Wörgl, Austria
			Ondrejka 42'; Udoh 55'	Stadium: Sportzentrum Wörgl; Attendance: 0
Note: Two periods of 35 minutes.

13 July 2023 Friendly	Brøndby IF (Denmark)	0–0	(Belgium) Antwerp	Waidring, Austria
				Stadium: Waldstadion; Attendance: 0

20 July 2024 Friendly	Antwerp (Belgium)	2–3	(Belgium) Francs Borains	Antwerp, Belgium
	Vandeplas; Valencia			Stadium: Bosuilstadion; Attendance: 0

20 July 2024 Friendly	Antwerp (Belgium)	1–2	(Italy) Parma Calcio	Antwerp, Belgium
	Balikwisha 24'		Partipilo 31'; Hernani 33'	Stadium: Bosuilstadion; Referee: Wim Smet

5 September 2024 Friendly	Antwerp (Belgium)	4–1	(Netherlands) Helmond Sport	Antwerp, Belgium
	Scott; Smits; Stanic; Chery			Stadium: Bosuilstadion

10 October 2024 Friendly	Antwerp (Belgium)	2–1	(Belgium) Beveren	Antwerp, Belgium
	Valencia; Janssen			Stadium: Bosuilstadion

4 January 2025 Friendly	Antwerp (Belgium)	4–2	(Netherlands) PEC Zwolle	Antwerp, Belgium
	Chery (pen.), Janssen; Adekami		Vente; Krastev	Stadium: Bosuilstadion

== Competitions ==
=== Overall record ===
Competition	First match	Last match	Starting round	Record							
Competition	First match	Last match	Starting round	Pld	W	D	L	GF	GA	GD	Win %
Belgian Pro League	28 July 2024	14–16 March 2025	Matchday 1	30	12	10	8	47	32	+15	40.00
Belgian Cup	31 October 2024	6 February 2025	Seventh round	5	2	2	1	13	5	+8	40.00
Total				35	14	12	9	60	37	+23	40.00

Last updated: 16 March 2025
Source: Competitions

=== Belgian Pro League ===
==== League table ====
Pos	Team	Pld	W	D	L	GF	GA	GD	Pts	Qualification or relegation
3	Union SG	30	15	10	5	49	25	+24	55	Qualification for the Champions' play-offs
4	Anderlecht	30	15	6	9	50	27	+23	51	Qualification for the Champions' play-offs
5	Antwerp	30	12	10	8	47	32	+15	46	Qualification for the Champions' play-offs
6	Gent	30	11	12	7	41	33	+8	45	Qualification for the Champions' play-offs
7	Standard Liège	30	10	9	11	22	35	−13	39	Qualification for the Europe play-offs

Source: Jupiler Pro League (in Dutch), Soccerway
Rules for classification: 1) Points; 2) Matches won; 3) Goal difference; 4) Goals scored; 5) Away matches won; 6) Away goal difference; 7) Away goals scored; 8) Play-off.

==== Results summary ====
Overall								Home						Away					
Pld	W	D	L	GF	GA	GD	Pts	W	D	L	GF	GA	GD	W	D	L	GF	GA	GD
30	12	10	8	47	32	+15	46	8	3	4	33	17	+16	4	7	4	14	15	−1

Last updated: 16 March 2025.

==== Results by round ====
Round	1	2	3	4	5	6	7	8	9	10	11	12	13	14	15	16	17	18	19	20	21	22	23	24	25	26	27	28	29	30
Ground	A	H	H	A	H	A	H	A	H	H	A	H	A	A	H	A	H	A	A	H	A	H	A	H	A	H	H	A	H	A
Result	W	L	W	L	L	D	W	W	W	W	D	W	L	W	D	L	L	D	W	D	D	W	D	W	L	W	D	D	L	D
Position	2	9	4	6	10	11	8	2	2	2	2	2	3	2	3	3	4	4	4	4	4	5	5	4	5	5	5	5	5	5

Updated to match(es) played on 16 March 2025. Source:
A = Away; H = Home; W = Win; D = Draw; L = Loss

==== Matches ====
The league fixtures were announced on 11 June 2024.

28 July 2024 1	Charleroi	0–1	Antwerp	Charleroi
18:30 CEST (UTC+2)	Petris (yellow card) 15'; Camara (yellow card) 64'; Dragsnes (yellow card) 76'; Titraoui (yellow card) 88'; Heymans (yellow card) 90+1'		Janssen 10', (yellow card) 83'; Odoi (yellow card) 90+2'	Stadium: Stade du Pays de Charleroi; Attendance: 8,000; Referee: Lawrence Visser

4 August 2024 2	Antwerp	1–2	Anderlecht	Antwerp
13:30 CEST (UTC+2)	Lammens 25' (o.g.); Ashimeru 80'		Kerk 34'; Alderweireld (yellow card) 39'; Odoi (yellow card) 90+1'	Stadium: Bosuilstadion; Attendance: 16,144; Referee: Erik Lambrechts

11 August 2024 3	Antwerp	6–1	STVV	Antwerp
16:00 CEST (UTC+2)	Chery 4'; Costa (yellow card) 22'; Doumbia 39'; Ondrejka 55', 65', 81'; Valencia 68'		Ogawa 54'	Stadium: Bosuilstadion; Attendance: 12,000; Referee: Kevin Van Damme

18 August 2024 4	Club Brugge	1–0	Antwerp	Bruges
13:30 CEST (UTC+2)	Nilsson (yellow card) 57', (goal) 81' (pen.)		Doumbia (yellow card) 21'; Odoi (yellow card) 21' (yellow-red card) 87'; Van den Bosch (yellow card) 90+4'	Stadium: Jan Breydel Stadium; Attendance: 22,876; Referee: Lothar D'hondt

24 August 2024 5	Antwerp	0–1	K.V. Mechelen	Antwerp
20:45 CEST (UTC+2)	Costa (yellow card) 71'; Alderweireld (yellow card) 80'		Ouattara (yellow card) 4'; Van den Eynden (yellow card) 57', (goal) 42'; Schoofs (yellow card) 80'	Stadium: Bosuilstadion; Attendance: 13,000; Referee: Nicolas Laforge

1 September 2024 6	Gent	1–1	Antwerp	Ghent
16:00 CEST (UTC+2)	Kums 16', (yellow card) 33'; Torunarigha (yellow card) 45+4'; Watanabe (yellow card) 75'; Mitrović (yellow card) 90+5'		Chery 30'; Odoi (yellow card) 48'; Costa (yellow card) 57'; Corbanie (yellow card) 87'	Stadium: Planet Group Arena; Attendance: 15,023; Referee: Nathan Verboomen

15 September 2024 7	Antwerp	2–0	Union SG	Antwerp
13:30 CEST (UTC+2)	Janssen 53', (yellow card) 54'; Odoi (yellow card) 57'; Chery 62'		Mac Allister (yellow card) 45+2' (yellow-red card) 60'; Ivanović (yellow card) 60'	Stadium: Bosuilstadion; Attendance: 15,000; Referee: Lawrence Visser

21 September 2024 8	Westerlo	1–2	Antwerp	Westerlo
18:15 CEST (UTC+2)	Piedfort (yellow card) 32'; Frigan (yellow card) 32', (goal) 45'; Reynolds (yellow card) 74'; Vušković (yellow card) 90+4'		Alderweireld 41', 90+5'; Janssen (yellow card) 82'	Stadium: Het Kuipje; Attendance: 6,500; Referee: Erik Lambrechts

29 September 2024 9	Antwerp	5–0	Beerschot VA	Antwerp
13:30 CEST (UTC+2)	Ondrejka 28', (yellow card) 54'; Chery 58', 61'; Janssen 62'		Weymans (yellow card) 5'; Konstantopoulos (yellow card) 71'	Stadium: Bosuilstadion; Attendance: 16,144; Referee: Lothar D'hondt
Note: The match got suspended at a 4-0 score, because of flares being thrown on the pitch multiple times by the visiting fans. Beerschot decided to forfeit the remainder of the match, resulting in a 5-0 score.

6 October 2024 10	Antwerp	3–0	Cercle Brugge	Antwerp
16:00 CEST (UTC+2)	Kerk 19'; Chery 23'; Ondrejka (yellow card) 36', (goal) 83'		Van der Bruggen (yellow card) 17'; Miangue (yellow card) 48'; Ravych (yellow card) 75'	Stadium: Bosuilstadion; Attendance: 12,500; Referee: Nicolas Laforge

20 October 2024 11	OH Leuven	1–1	Antwerp	Leuven
16:00 CEST (UTC+2)	Mitrović 66'		Ondrejka 34'	Stadium: Den Dreef; Attendance: 8,703; Referee: Wim Smet

27 October 2024 12	Antwerp	3–0	Standard Liège	Antwerp
16:00 CET (UTC+1)	Costa (yellow card) 35'; Janssen 45'; Valencia (yellow card) 60'; Chery 63'; Ondrejka 90+8'		Šutalo (yellow card) 75'; Lawrence (yellow card) 87'	Stadium: Bosuilstadion; Attendance: 15,000; Referee: Nathan Verboomen

3 November 2024 13	Genk	2–0	Antwerp	Genk
13:30 CET (UTC+1)	Smets (yellow card) 27'; Hrošovský 45+1', 54'; Sadick (yellow card) 61'		Costa (yellow card) 77'; Alderweireld (yellow card) 82'	Stadium: Cegeka Arena; Attendance: 20,407; Referee: Lothar D'hondt

9 November 2024 14	Kortrijk	1–2	Antwerp	Kortrijk
16:00 CET (UTC+1)	Van Den Bosch 56' (o.g.); Ferri (yellow card) 84'; Dejaegere (yellow card) 87'; Mehssatou (yellow card) 90+4'		Janssen 8'; Van Den Bosch 50'; Bozhinov (yellow card) 70'; Smits (yellow card) 90+4'	Stadium: Guldensporen Stadion; Attendance: 6,814; Referee: Jan Boterberg

22 November 2024 15	Antwerp	1–1	Dender EH	Antwerp
20:45 CET (UTC+1)	Verstraeten (yellow card) 6'; Janssen (yellow card) 39'; Costa (yellow card) 54'; Kerk 80'		Fila 3', (yellow card) 55'; Berte (yellow card) 64'; Gonçalves (yellow card) 90+44'	Stadium: Bosuilstadion; Attendance: 12,000; Referee: Kevin Van Damme

1 December 2024 16	Union SG	2–1	Antwerp	Saint-Gilles
18:30 CET (UTC+1)	Mac Allister (yellow card) 13', (goal) 45+5'; Machida (yellow card) 40' (yellow-red card) 49'; Burgess (yellow card) 45+1'; Sadiki (yellow card) 69'; Sykes 69'		Janssen 1'; Kerk (yellow card) 59'; Bataille (yellow card) 68'; Costa (yellow card) 72'; Valencia (yellow card) 75'; Odoi (yellow card) 90+4'	Stadium: Joseph Marien Stadium; Attendance: 8,004; Referee: Nicolas Laforge

8 December 2024 17	Antwerp	1–3	Charleroi	Antwerp
13:30 CET (UTC+1)	Janssen (yellow card) 9'; Alderweireld (yellow card) 58'; Chery 90+1' (pen.)		Štulić 2', 54', (yellow card) 21'; Andreou 49'; Koné (yellow card) 88'	Stadium: Bosuilstadion; Attendance: 11,000; Referee: Jan Boterberg

13 December 2024 18	KV Mechelen	1–1	Antwerp	Mechelen
20:45 CET (UTC+1)	Raman (yellow card) 66'; Van den Eynden 79'		Touba 45' (o.g.); Odoi (yellow card) 78'; Valencia (yellow card) 89'	Stadium: Achter de Kazerne; Attendance: 16,112; Referee: Wim Smet

21 December 2024 19	Dender EH	1–3	Antwerp	Denderleeuw
18:15 CET (UTC+1)	Scheidler 56'		Cools 6' (o.g.); Bataille (yellow card) 23'; Janssen 60'; Gonçalves 72' (o.g.)	Stadium: Van Roystadion; Attendance: 4,500; Referee: Bert Put

26 December 2024 20	Antwerp	2–2	Genk	Antwerp
13:30 CET (UTC+1)	Kerk 9', 32'; Van Den Bosch (yellow card) 83'; Corbanie (yellow card) 90'		Arokodare 12', 51'; Nkuba (yellow card) 62'	Stadium: Bosuilstadion; Attendance: 17,400; Referee: Lothar D'hondt

12 January 2025 21	Beerschot VA	1–1	Antwerp	Antwerp
13:30 CET (UTC+1)	Verlinden 1'; Henderson (yellow card) 28'; Fayed (yellow card) 66'; Al-Ghamdi (yellow card) 85'		Odoi (yellow card) 19'; Janssen (yellow card) 25'; Chery 59'; Van Den Bosch (yellow card) 76'	Stadium: Olympisch Stadion; Attendance: 12,500; Referee: Jan Boterberg

19 January 2025 22	Antwerp	3–2	Westerlo	Antwerp
19:15 CET (UTC+1)	Janssen 15'; Alderweireld 57', (yellow card) 63'; Deman (yellow card) 60'; Doumbia 90+7' (pen.), (yellow card) 90+9'		Bos 23'; Yow 36' (pen.); Rommens (yellow card) 79'; Haspolat (yellow card) 84'; Reynolds (yellow card) 90+1'; Bayram (yellow card) 90+7'; Devine (yellow card) 90+11'	Stadium: Bosuilstadion; Attendance: 12,211; Referee: Bram Van Driessche

24 January 2025 23	STVV	1–1	Antwerp	Sint-Truiden
20:45 CET (UTC+1)	Lamkel Zé 18', (yellow card) 90+2'; Belaïd (yellow card) 54'		Valencia 10'; Doumbia (yellow card) 44'; Riedewald (red card) 90+1'; Deman (yellow card) 90+2'; Odoi (yellow card) 90+2'; Bozhinov (yellow card) 90+5'	Stadium: Stayen; Attendance: 4,825; Referee: Kevin Van Damme

2 February 2025 24	Antwerp	2–1	Club Brugge	Antwerp
13:30 CET (UTC+1)	Adekami (yellow card) 85'; Doumbia 86'; Chery 90', (yellow card) 90'		Vanaken 23', (yellow card) 77'; De Cuyper (yellow card) 64'	Stadium: Bosuilstadion; Attendance: 15,000; Referee: Lawrence Visser

9 February 2025 25	Anderlecht	2–0	Antwerp	Anderlecht
13:30 CET (UTC+1)	Sardella (yellow card) 28'; Dolberg 58', 64'		Kerk (yellow card) 26'; Renders (yellow card) 35'; Janssen (yellow card) 44'; Alderweireld (yellow card) 73'	Stadium: Lotto Park; Attendance: 21,900; Referee: Jan Boterberg

15 February 2025 26	Antwerp	2–1	Kortrijk	Antwerp
18:15 CET (UTC+1)	Janssen 22'; Chery 42'		Kadri 53'; Ferri (yellow card) 72'	Stadium: Bosuilstadion; Attendance: 11,245; Referee: Bram Van Driessche

22 February 2025 27	Antwerp	2–2	OH Leuven	Antwerp
20:45 CET (UTC+1)	Kerk (yellow card) 38'; Odoi 47'; Janssen 58'; Van Den Bosch (yellow card) 71'; Deman (yellow card) 86'		Ikwuemesi (yellow card) 16'; Verstraete (yellow card) 22'; Pletinckx 56'; Mijatović (yellow card) 90+3'; Banzuzi 90+6'	Stadium: Bosuilstadion; Attendance: 13,000; Referee: Nicolas Laforge

1 March 2025 28	Cercle Brugge	0–0	Antwerp	Bruges
16:00 CET (UTC+1)	Diakité (yellow card) 53'; Ravych (red card) 74'		Riedewald (yellow card) 47'; Achichi (yellow card) 81'	Stadium: Jan Breydel Stadium; Attendance: 5,683; Referee: Bert Put

9 March 2025 29	Antwerp	0–1	Gent	Antwerp
18:30 CET (UTC+1)	Doumbia (yellow card) 90+5'		Omgba 83'	Stadium: Bosuilstadion; Attendance: 13,000; Referee: Erik Lambrechts

16 March 2025 30	Standard Liège	0–0	Antwerp	Liège
13:30 CET (UTC+1)	Bolingoli (yellow card) 90+5'		Benítez (yellow card) 19'; Janssen (yellow card) 22'; Deman (yellow card) 87'; Doumbia (yellow card) 90+1'	Stadium: Stade Maurice Dufrasne; Attendance: 14,019; Referee: Bram Van Driessche

==== Champions' Play-Off ====
Pos	Team	Pld	W	D	L	GF	GA	GD	Pts	Qualification or relegation	USG	CLU	GNK	AND	ANT	GNT
1	Union SG (C)	10	9	1	0	22	3	+19	56	Qualification for the Champions League league phase		0–0	1–0	2–0	5–1	3–1
2	Club Brugge	10	7	2	1	21	6	+15	53	Qualification for the Champions League third qualifying round	0–1		1–0	2–0	1–1	4–1
3	Genk	10	4	1	5	14	11	+3	47	Qualification for the Europa League play-off round (Note: Club Brugge won the 2024–25 Belgian Cup and qualified for the Champions League through finishing second, the Europa League play-off round berth was therefore transferred to regular season winners Genk.)	1–2	0–2		2–1	0–1	4–0
4	Anderlecht	10	3	1	6	12	13	−1	36	Qualification for the Europa League second qualifying round	0–1	1–3	1–2		0–0	5–0
5	Antwerp	10	2	3	5	10	18	−8	32	Qualification for the European competition play-off	0–4	2–3	1–1	1–3		0–1
6	Gent	10	1	0	9	4	32	−28	26		0–3	0–5	1–4	0–1	0–3	

Source: Jupiler Pro League (in Dutch), Soccerway
Rules for classification: 1) Points; 2) Points without (possible) half points added due to rounding; 3) Regular season finishing position.
(C) Champions

==== Results summary ====
Overall								Home						Away					
Pld	W	D	L	GF	GA	GD	Pts	W	D	L	GF	GA	GD	W	D	L	GF	GA	GD
10	2	3	5	10	18	−8	9	0	1	4	4	12	−8	2	2	1	6	6	0

Source: Jupiler Pro League

==== Results by round ====
Round	1	2	3	4	5	6	7	8	9	10
Ground	A	H	H	A	H	A	H	A	H	A
Result	L	L	L	D	D	W	L	W	L	D
Position	5	5	6	6	6	5	5	5	5	5

Source: Jupiler Pro League
A = Away; H = Home; W = Win; D = Draw; L = Loss

==== Matches ====
29 March 2025 1	Union SG	5–1	Antwerp	Forest
20:45 CET (UTC+1)	Khalaili 4', (yellow card) 34'; David 14'; Ivanović 45+3' (pen.), 87'; Niang (yellow card) 68'; Machida 71'		Kerk 37'; Bozhinov (yellow card) 15' (yellow-red card) 45+1'; Deman (yellow card) 67'	Stadium: Stade Joseph Marien; Attendance: 8,800; Referee: Nicolas Laforge

6 April 2025 2	Antwerp	2–3	Club Brugge	Antwerp
13:30 CEST (UTC+2)	Janssen 63'; Balikwisha 71', (yellow card) 84'; Deman (yellow card) 90+4'		Jutglà 9'; Jashari 29'; Tzolis 45+3'; Siquet (yellow card) 61'; Vermant (yellow card) 90+1'	Stadium: Bosuilstadion; Attendance: 16,144; Referee: Lothar D'hondt

13 April 2025 3	Antwerp	0–1	AA Gent	Antwerp
13:30 CEST (UTC+2)	Janssen (yellow card) 27'; Odoi (yellow card) 41'; Bataille (yellow card) 90'		Fadiga 22', (yellow card) 29'; Torunarigha (yellow card) 79'; Watanabe (yellow card) 90'; Mitrović (yellow card) 90+6'	Stadium: Bosuilstadion; Attendance: 12,000; Referee: Nathan Verboomen

20 April 2025 4	Anderlecht	0–0	Antwerp	Anderlecht
13:30 CEST (UTC+2)	Simić (yellow card) 43'; Huerta (yellow card) 90+1'		Deman (yellow card) 28'; Lammens (yellow card) 90'	Stadium: Lotto Park; Attendance: 21,900; Referee: Bram Van Driessche

23 April 2025 5	Antwerp	1–1	Racing Genk	Antwerp
20:30 CEST (UTC+2)	Van Den Bosch (yellow card) 42'; Balikwisha 61'; Renders (yellow card) 83'; Bayo (yellow card) 90+3'		Arokodare 71'	Stadium: Bosuilstadion; Attendance: 12,188; Referee: Lawrence Visser

27 April 2025 6	Racing Genk	0–1	Antwerp	Genk
16:00 CEST (UTC+2)	Kayembe (yellow card) 37'		Chery 35' (pen.), (yellow card) 37'; Kerk (yellow card) 37'	Stadium: Cegeka Arena; Attendance: 20,161; Referee: Jan Boterberg

1 May 2025 7	Antwerp	1–3	Anderlecht	Antwerp
13:30 CEST (UTC+2)	Odoi (yellow card) 47' (yellow-red card) 63'; Balikwisha 88'		Gotō 55'; De Cat 69'; Edozie 86'	Stadium: Bosuilstadion; Attendance: 14,000; Referee: Erik Lambrechts

11 May 2025 8	AA Gent	0–3	Antwerp	Ghent
13:30 CEST (UTC+2)	Brown (yellow card) 52'; Samoise (yellow card) 57'; Fadiga (red card) 64'		Deman (yellow card) 18'; Doumbia (yellow card) 45+3'; Chery 34', 42'; Kerk 59'	Stadium: Planet Group Arena; Attendance: 11,386; Referee: Lothar D'hondt

17 May 2025 9	Antwerp	0–4	Union SG	Antwerp
20:45 CEST (UTC+2)	Kerk (yellow card) 29'		Fuseini 6', 35'; Ivanović 41' (pen.); Mac Allister (yellow card) 55'; David 83'	Stadium: Bosuilstadion; Attendance: 14,987; Referee: Jasper Vergoote

25 May 2025 10	Club Brugge	1–1	Antwerp	Bruges
18:30 CEST (UTC+2)	Tzolis 43'; Vanaken (yellow card) 90'		Balikwisha 35'; Doumbia (yellow card) 72'	Stadium: Jan Breydel Stadium; Attendance: 24,800; Referee: Lothar D'hondt

=== European competition play-off ===
29 May 2025	Antwerp	1–2	Charleroi	Antwerp
18:30 CEST (UTC+2)	Deman (yellow card) 76'; Bayo 86'		Keita 61'; Zorgane (yellow card) 65'; Guiagon 90+5'; Heymans (yellow card) 90+10'	Stadium: Bosuilstadion; Attendance: 14,000; Referee: Erik Lambrechts

=== Belgian Cup ===
31 October 2024 Seventh round	Antwerp	6–1	Deinze	Antwerp
21:00 CET (UTC+1)	Praet (yellow card) 26'; Janssen 29'; Corbanie 31'; Chery 48', 71'; Valencia 68', 87'		Prychynenko (yellow card) 12'; Mertens 53'	Stadium: Bosuilstadion; Attendance: 12,423; Referee: Arthur Denil

4 December 2024 Eighth round	Kortrijk	0–0 (a.e.t.) (3–4 p)	Antwerp	Kortrijk
20:30 CET (UTC+1)	Kadri (yellow card) 17'; Da Silva (yellow card) 60'; Lagae (yellow card) 74'; Ambrose (yellow card) 80'; El Idrissy (yellow card) 90'		Praet (yellow card) 37'; Chery (yellow card) 80'; Scott (yellow card) 96'; Odoi (yellow card) 116'	Stadium: Guldensporen Stadion; Attendance: 3,772; Referee: Bert Put
	Penalties
	Ambrose (penalty scored); El Idrissy (penalty missed); Kaneko (penalty scored); Fossum (penalty missed); Mehssatou (penalty scored)		Odoi (penalty missed); Vandeplas (penalty scored); Butez (penalty scored); Corbanie (penalty scored); Alderweireld (penalty scored)

8 January 2025 Quarter-finals	Antwerp	5–1	Union SG	Antwerp
20:45 CET (UTC+1)	Valencia (yellow card) 33'; Chery 40', 50' (pen.); Van Den Bosch (yellow card) 52'; Janssen 64'; Kerk 84'; Corbanie (yellow card) 87'; Praet 90+3'		Vanhoutte (yellow card) 26'; Boufal (yellow card) 31'; Sykes (yellow card) 42'; Fuseini (yellow card) 52'; Sadiki 56'	Stadium: Bosuilstadion; Attendance: 13,000; Referee: Lawrence Visser

16 January 2025 Semi-final 1st leg	Anderlecht	1–0	Antwerp	Anderlecht
20:45 CET (UTC+1)	Adryelson (yellow card) 4'; Simić (yellow card) 4'; Degreef 30'		Janssen (yellow card) 4'; Doumbia (yellow card) 39'; Deman (yellow card) 70'; Odoi (yellow card) 74'	Stadium: Lotto Park; Referee: Nathan Verboomen

6 February 2025 Semi-final 2nd leg	Antwerp	2–2 (2–3 agg.)	Anderlecht	Antwerp
20:45 CET (UTC+1)	Odoi 26', (yellow card) 21' (yellow-red card) 37'; Deman (yellow card) 30'; Doumbia (yellow card) 55'; Janssen (yellow card) 83'; Kerk 85'		Sardella (yellow card) 30'; Verschaeren 32'; Leoni (yellow card) 37'; Hazard (yellow card) 87'; Dendoncker 90+1'	Stadium: Bosuilstadion; Attendance: 16,000; Referee: Jasper Vergoote

== Statistics ==
=== Appearances and goals ===
No.	Pos	Nat	Player	Total		Belgian Pro League		Belgian Cup	
No.	Pos	Nat	Player	Apps	Goals	Apps	Goals	Apps	Goals
Goalkeepers
1	GK	(France) FRA	Jean Butez	0	0	0	0	0	0
41	GK	(Belgium) BEL	Mathis Van Gils	0	0	0	0	0	0
81	GK	(Germany) GER	Niels Devalckeneer	0	0	0	0	0	0
91	GK	(Belgium) BEL	Senne Lammens	8	0	8	0	0	0
Defenders
2	DF	(Belgium) BEL	Kobe Corbanie	4	0	1+3	0	0	0
3	DF	(Belgium) BEL	Bjorn Engels	0	0	0	0	0	0
5	DF	(Argentina) ARG	Ayrton Costa	7	0	7	0	0	0
6	DF	(Ghana) GHA	Denis Odoi	6	0	6	0	0	0
23	DF	(Belgium) BEL	Toby Alderweireld	8	2	8	2	0	0
25	DF	(Belgium) BEL	Jelle Bataille	8	0	8	0	0	0
26	DF	(Bulgaria) BUL	Rosen Bozhinov	0	0	0	0	0	0
33	DF	(Belgium) BEL	Zeno van den Bosch	8	0	8	0	0	0
50	DF	(Kosovo) KOS	Laurit Krasniqi	0	0	0	0	0	0
54	DF	(Belgium) BEL	Semm Renders	0	0	0	0	0	0
75	DF	(Belgium) BEL	Andreas Verstraeten	0	0	0	0	0	0
Midfielders
4	MF	(Netherlands) NED	Jairo Riedewald	2	0	0+2	0	0	0
8	MF	(Belgium) BEL	Dennis Praet	2	0	0+2	0	0	0
9	MF	(Suriname) SUR	Tjaronn Chery	8	3	8	3	0	0
20	MF	(Mali) MLI	Mahamadou Doumbia	8	1	8	1	0	0
22	MF	(Ivory Coast) CIV	Farouck Adekami	0	0	0	0	0	0
21	MF	(Guinea) GUI	Amadou Diawara	0	0	0	0	0	0
30	MF	(Germany) GER	Christopher Scott	4	0	0+4	0	0	0
46	MF	(Belgium) BEL	Milan Smits	1	0	0+1	0	0	0
Forwards
7	FW	(Suriname) SUR	Gyrano Kerk	8	1	7+1	1	0	0
10	FW	(Belgium) BEL	Michel Balikwisha	1	0	1	0	0	0
11	FW	(Sweden) SWE	Jacob Ondrejka	8	3	7+1	3	0	0
14	FW	(Ecuador) ECU	Anthony Valencia	7	1	0+7	1	0	0
18	FW	(Netherlands) NED	Vincent Janssen	8	2	8	2	0	0
19	FW	(Nigeria) NGA	Victor Udoh	6	0	0+6	0	0	0
67	FW	(Belgium) BEL	Alexandre Stanic	1	0	0+1	0	0	0
79	FW	(Belgium) BEL	Gerard Vandeplas	0	0	0	0	0	0
Players transferred out during the season
8	MF	(Niger) NIG	Alhassan Yusuf	1	0	0+1	0	0	0
16	MF	(Belgium) BEL	Mandela Keita	5	0	2+3	0	0	0
24	MF	(Netherlands) NED	Jurgen Ekkelenkamp	1	0	1	0	0	0

Last updated: 28 September 2024
Source: Competitions

=== Goalscorers ===
Rank	No.	Pos	Nat	Name	Belgian Pro League	Belgian Cup	Total
1	9	MF	(Suriname)	Tjaronn Chery	14	4	18
2	18	FW	(Netherlands)	Vincent Janssen	11	2	13
3	7	FW	(Suriname)	Gyrano Kerk	7	2	9
4	11	FW	(Sweden)	Jacob Ondrejka	7	0	7
5	10	FW	(Belgium)	Michel-Ange Balikwisha	4	0	4
5	14	FW	(Ecuador)	Anthony Valencia	2	2	4
7	20	MF	(Mali)	Mahamadou Doumbia	3	0	3
7	23	DF	(Belgium)	Toby Alderweireld	3	0	3
9	6	DF	(Ghana)	Denis Odoi	1	1	2
10	2	DF	(Belgium)	Kobe Corbanie	0	1	1
10	8	MF	(Belgium)	Dennis Praet	0	1	1
10	27	FW	(Guinea)	Mohamed Bayo	1	0	1
10	33	DF	(Belgium)	Zeno Van Den Bosch	1	0	1
Forfeit goals					1	0	1
Owngoals					3	0	1
Totals					58	13	71
