= 2024 Belgian Cup final =

- Event: 2023–24 Belgian Cup
Union SG	Antwerp
1	0
- Date: 9 May 2024
- Venue: King Baudouin Stadium, Brussels
- Referee: Erik Lambrechts
- Weather: sunny

The 2024 Belgian Cup final, named Croky Cup after the sponsor, will be the 69th Belgian Cup final and is scheduled to be played on 9 May 2024. Union SG qualified on 28 February for its third ever Cup final, 110 years after last reaching it in 1914. One day later, current cup holders Antwerp became their opponent, qualifying for its sixth final. Antwerp would be the first club to defend its title since Club Brugge won the 1996 Belgian Cup final after having already won the 1995 Belgian Cup final.

== Route to the final ==
Union SG					Antwerp
Opponent	Result	Legs	Scorers	Round	Opponent	Result	Legs	Scorers
Meux (IV)	2–1	2–1 home	Leysen, Rasmussen	Seventh round	Lierse Kempenzonen (II)	4–1	4–1 away	Alderweireld, Ilenikhena, De Laet, Oularé (o.g.)
Beveren (II)	2–0	2–0 away	Bateau (o.g.), Koyalipou (o.g.)	Eighth round	Charleroi (I)	5–2	5–2 home	Ejuke, Boukamir (o.g.), Janssen (2), Ilenikhena
Anderlecht (I)	2–1	2–1 home	Lapoussin, Rodríguez (pen.)	Quarter-finals	OH Leuven (I)	3–2	3–2 away	Janssen (2 of which 1 pen.), Van Den Bosch
Club Brugge (I)	3–2	1–2 away; 2–0 home	Machida; Amoura, Sykes	Semi-finals	Oostende (II)	4–1	1–1 away; 3–0 home	Doumbia; Ilenikhena (2), Van Den Bosch

== Pre-match ==
Going into the match, both teams were struggling: Antwerp had a difficult season as defending league and cup champions and despite playing in the UEFA Champions League during the season, the club had ups and downs throughout the season and was currently only in 6th in the league, which would mean they were not going to qualify for European football. Meanwhile, Union SG had dominated the regular season, but had been struggling since the playoffs (starting with four losses) and had dropped from first to third place, with three matches to go however, they could still win the title.

The winner of the match qualifies for the 2024–25 UEFA Europa League Play-off round. If Union SG were to win but also finish in the top two of the league, they would instead qualify for the qualifying rounds of the 2024–25 UEFA Champions League, with the ticket for the 2024–25 UEFA Europa League Play-off round, in that case, being passed along to the third-place finisher in the league.

== Match ==
=== Summary ===
Both teams started the match in no-risk mode, with lots of duels for the ball, but without any major chances. Union SG had most possession (about 75%). First excitement came when Jurgen Ekkelenkamp hit the outside of the post from a long range kick over the ground from outside of the penalty area, about midway through the first half. In the added time of the first half, Zeno Van Den Bosch headed-on a corner kick which ended up with Kōki Machida who reacted fasted to open the scoring. During the second half Antwerp tried to equalize, but no chances came from it until 10 minutes from time when Christian Burgess lost the ball to Ekkelenkamp whose shot went straight at Anthony Moris. It would turn out to be the only big chance for Antwerp, after that on multiple occasions Union SG came close to extending the lead on counter-attacks, with both Cameron Puertas and Mohamed Amoura missing big chances in the final minutes to leave the score at 1–0.

=== Details ===
9 May 2024
15:30 CEST

Union SG	1–0	Antwerp
Machida 45+1'	Report

King Baudouin Stadium, Brussels
Referee: Erik Lambrechts

Union SG	Antwerp

GK	49	(Luxembourg) Anthony Moris	(yellow card) 90+1'
LB	5	(Argentina) Kevin Mac Allister
CB	16	(England) Christian Burgess	(yellow card) 68'
CB	28	(Japan) Kōki Machida
CB	21	(Belgium) Alessio Castro-Montes	(yellow card) 90'
RB	24	(Belgium) Charles Vanhoutte
MF	23	(Spain) Cameron Puertas
MF	4	(Norway) Mathias Rasmussen		(substituted off) 84'
MF	10	(Madagascar) Loïc Lapoussin		(substituted off) 81'
CF	47	(Algeria) Mohamed Amoura	(yellow card) 24'	(substituted off) 90+6'
CF	29	(Sweden) Gustaf Nilsson		(substituted off) 81'
Substitutes:
FW	7	(Belgium) Elton Kabangu
MF	8	(Ivory Coast) Jean Thierry Lazare		(substituted on) 90+6'
FW	11	(Germany) Henok Teklab
GK	12	(Austria) Heinz Lindner
FW	13	(Ecuador) Kevin Rodríguez		(substituted on) 81'
DF	26	(England) Ross Sykes		(substituted on) 81'
DF	27	(Democratic Republic of the Congo) Noah Sadiki		(substituted on) 84'
Manager:
(Germany) Alexander Blessin

GK	91	(Belgium) Senne Lammens
RB	2	(Belgium) Ritchie De Laet		(substituted off) 73'
CB	23	(Belgium) Toby Alderweireld
CB	33	(Belgium) Zeno Van Den Bosch	(yellow card) 88'
LB	5	(Netherlands) Owen Wijndal		(substituted off) 86'
RW	7	(Suriname) Gyrano Kerk		(substituted off) 73'
MF	27	(Belgium) Mandela Keita
MF	24	(Netherlands) Jurgen Ekkelenkamp		(substituted off) 86'
LW	6	(Belgium) Eliot Matazo	(yellow card) 30'	(substituted off) 73'
FW	10	(Belgium) Michel-Ange Balikwisha
FW	18	(Netherlands) Vincent Janssen	(yellow card) 55'
Substitutes:
MF	8	(Nigeria) Alhassan Yusuf		(substituted on) 73'
FW	9	(Nigeria) George Ilenikhena		(substituted on) 86'
FW	19	(Nigeria) Chidera Ejuke		(substituted on) 73'
DF	34	(Belgium) Jelle Bataille		(substituted on) 73'
DF	44	(France) Soumaïla Coulibaly		(substituted on) 86'
FW	60	(Nigeria) Victor Udoh
GK	81	(Belgium) Niels Devalckeneer
Manager:
(Netherlands) Mark van Bommel

Match rules

- 90 minutes.
- 30 minutes of extra time if necessary.
- Penalty shoot-out if scores still level.
- Seven named substitutes.
- Maximum of five substitutions.
