= Kobe Corbanie =

Belgian footballer (born 2005)

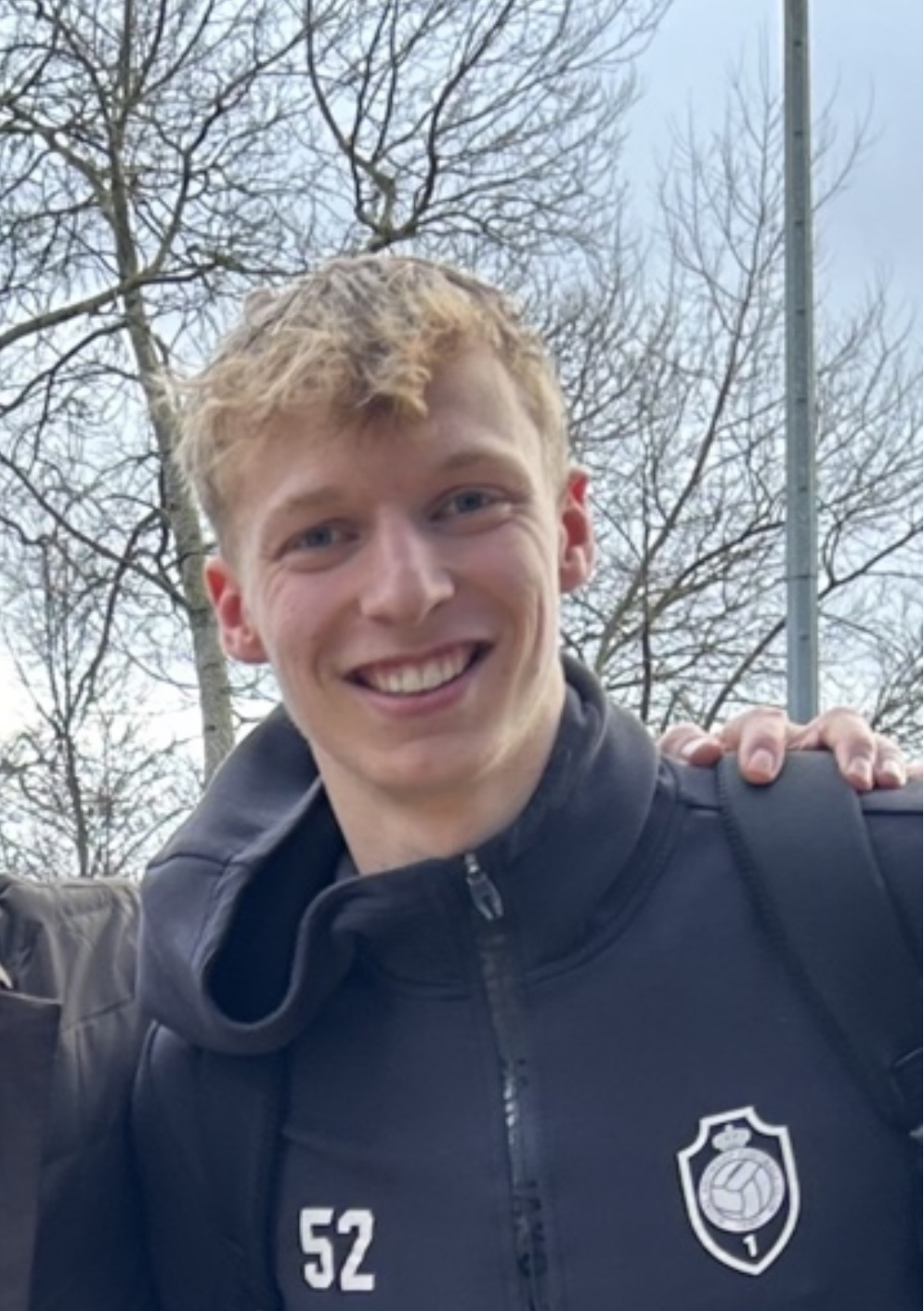
- Corbanie with Royal Antwerp in 2024

Personal information
- Date of birth: 10 May 2005 (age 21)
- Height: 1.79 m (5 ft 10 in)
- Position: Defender

Team information
- Current team: Mechelen
- Number: 20

Youth career
- 2010–2012: Heindonk
- 2012–2013: Mechelen
- 2013–2018: Lierse
- 2018–2022: Royal Antwerp

Senior career*
Years	Team	Apps	(Gls)
2022–2026	Young Reds	29	(1)
2023–2026	Royal Antwerp	43	(1)
2026–	Mechelen	1	(0)

International career
2022	Belgium U17	4	(0)
2023	Belgium U18	3	(0)
2023–2024	Belgium U19	6	(1)
- * Club domestic league appearances and goals as of 14:49, 15 August 2026 (UTC)

Kobe Corbanie (born 10 May 2005) is a Belgian footballer who plays as a defender for Mechelen.

== Career ==
=== Royal Antwerp ===
Corbanie grew up in a family supporting Club Brugge KV. He played youth football for K.V. Mechelen and Lierse S.K. before joining Young Reds, the reserve team of Royal Antwerp.

Corbanie made his debut on 15 January 2023 in a 2–0 loss at Royale Union Saint-Gilloise, playing the final five minutes as a substitute for Arthur Vermeeren. He totalled six brief substitute appearances as the team won the Belgian Pro League, and was profiled by the Voetbal Primeur website as competing with Jelle Bataille to replace the ageing Ritchie De Laet. He also won the Belgian Cup in his first season, playing the final three minutes of the semi-final second leg at home to Union SG and scoring in the penalty shootout. At the end of the season, he signed his first professional contract, of three years.

On 4 February 2024, Corbanie scored his first goal. One minute after replacing Mahamadou Doumbia, he took a long-range shot past Club Brugge goalkeeper Simon Mignolet to equalise in a 2–1 home win. His season ended on 28 April when he was injured in a 4–1 loss at eventual champions Union SG, and he missed the 2024 Belgian Cup final loss to the same club.

=== Mechelen ===
On 19 February 2026, Corbanie signed a three-year contract at Mechelen, effective from the new season. He mentioned his family home being within ten minutes of the stadium as a reason to sign. He had not appeared at all for Antwerp that season, due to the signing of Thibo Somers.

== Honours ==
Royal Antwerp

- Belgian Pro League: 2023–24
- Belgian Cup: 2023–24
