= Jacob Ondrejka =

Swedish footballer (born 2002)

Personal information
- Full name: Jacob Axel Per Ondrejka
- Date of birth: 2 September 2002 (age 24)
- Place of birth: Landskrona, Sweden
- Height: 1.80 m (5 ft 11 in)
- Positions: Left winger; attacking midfielder

Team information
- Current team: Groningen (on loan from Parma)
- Number: 11

Youth career
- –2014: BK Landora
- 2015–2018: Landskrona BoIS

Senior career*
Years	Team	Apps	(Gls)
2019	Landskrona BoIS	23	(1)
2020–2023	IF Elfsborg	90	(15)
2023–2025	Royal Antwerp	45	(12)
2025–	Parma	28	(5)
2026–	→ Groningen (loan)	2	(0)

International career^{‡}
2019–2020	Sweden U19	3	(0)
2022–2024	Sweden U21	12	(2)
2023	Sweden	1	(1)
- * Club domestic league appearances and goals as of 23 August 2026 ‡ National team caps and goals as of 16:35, 16 October 2024 (UTC)

Jacob Axel Per Ondrejka (born 2 September 2002) is a Swedish professional footballer who plays as a left winger or attacking midfielder for Eredivisie club Groningen, on loan from Serie A club Parma.

== Club career ==
On 1 July 2023, Ondrejka moved to reigning Belgian Pro League champions Royal Antwerp from Elfsborg in a deal worth €1,700,000.

On 23 January 2025, Ondrejka signed with Parma in Italy.

== International career ==
Ondrejka made his full international debut for Sweden on 12 January 2023, scoring the winning goal in a friendly 2–1 win against Iceland.

== Career statistics ==
=== Club ===
As of match played 1 February 2026

Appearances and goals by club, season and competition
Club	Season	League			National cup (Note: Includes Svenska Cupen, Belgian Cup)		Europe		Other		Total	
Club	Season	Division	Apps	Goals	Apps	Goals	Apps	Goals	Apps	Goals	Apps	Goals
Landskrona BoIS	2019	Ettan	23	1	0	0	–		–		23	1
IF Elfsborg	2020	Allsvenskan	20	1	3	0	–		–		23	1
IF Elfsborg	2021	Allsvenskan	28	3	3	1	3 (Note: Appearances in UEFA Europa Conference League)	0	–		34	4
IF Elfsborg	2022	Allsvenskan	30	4	6	5	2	0	–		38	9
IF Elfsborg	2023	Allsvenskan	12	7	0	0	–		–		12	7
IF Elfsborg	Total		90	15	12	6	5	0	–		107	21
Royal Antwerp	2023–24	Belgian Pro League	23	5	3	0	2 (Note: Appearances in UEFA Champions League)	0	1 (Note: Appearance in Belgian Super Cup)	0	29	5
Royal Antwerp	2024–25	Belgian Pro League	22	7	4	0	—		—		26	7
Royal Antwerp	Total		45	12	7	0	2	0	1	0	55	12
Parma	2024–25	Serie A	12	5	—		—		—		12	5
Parma	2025–26	Serie A	11	0	1	0	—		—		12	0
Parma	Total		23	5	1	0	0	0	0	0	24	5
Career total			181	33	20	6	7	0	1	0	209	39

=== International ===
Appearances and goals by national team and year
National team	Year	Apps	Goals
Sweden	2023	1	1
Total		1	1

Scores and results list Sweden's goal tally first, score column indicates score after each Ondrejka goal.

List of international goals scored by Jacob Ondrejka
No.	Date	Venue	Opponent	Score	Result	Competition	Ref.
1	12 January 2023	Estádio Algarve, Faro/Loulé, Portugal	Iceland	2–1	2–1	Friendly	

== Honours ==
Royal Antwerp

- Belgian Super Cup: 2023
