= Jean Butez =

French footballer (born 1995)

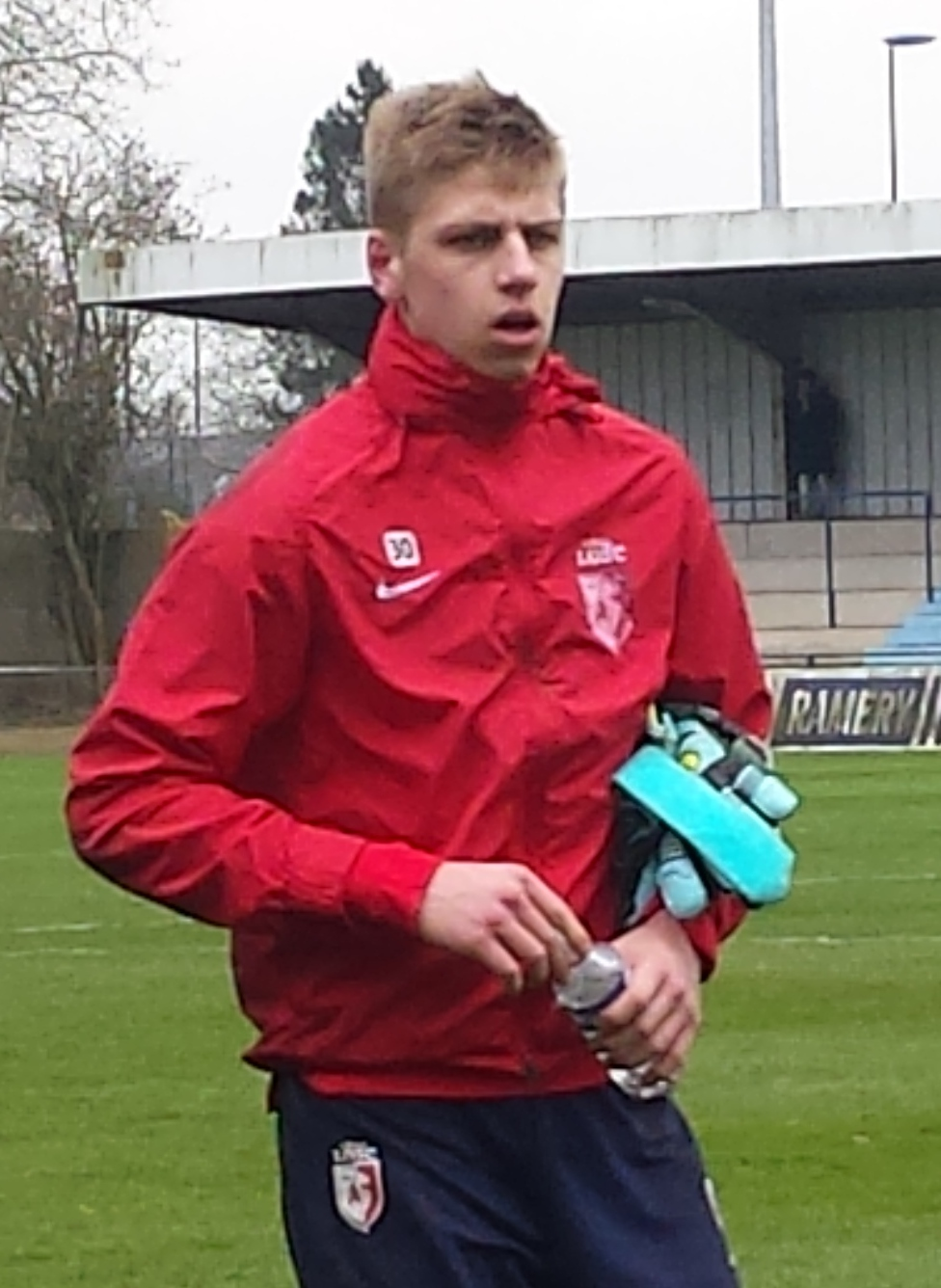
- Butez in 2015

Personal information
- Date of birth: 8 June 1995 (age 31)
- Place of birth: Lille, France
- Height: 1.89 m (6 ft 2 in)
- Position: Goalkeeper

Team information
- Current team: Como
- Number: 1

Youth career
- 2001–2003: Merris
- 2003–2016: Lille

Senior career*
| Years | Team | Apps | (Gls) |
| 2013–2018 | Lille II | 81 | (0) |
| 2017–2018 | Lille | 0 | (0) |
| 2017–2018 | → Mouscron (loan) | 10 | (0) |
| 2018–2020 | Mouscron | 46 | (0) |
| 2020–2025 | Antwerp | 135 | (0) |
| 2025– | Como | 66 | (0) |
- * Club domestic league appearances and goals as of 17:25, 21 November 2026 (UTC)

Jean Butez (born 8 June 1995) is a French professional footballer who plays as a goalkeeper for Serie A club Como.

Butez began his career at Lille, spending five seasons with the club's reserve team without making a first-team appearance. In 2017, he moved to Mouscron on loan and impressed enough to earn a permanent transfer the following year. In 2020, Butez signed with Antwerp, where he quickly became the starting goalkeeper. He played a key role in Antwerp's domestic and European success, contributing to their domestic treble in 2023 with 27 clean sheets, establishing himself as one of Belgium's top goalkeepers.

In 2026, aged 31, he was called up to the France national team for the first time, becoming the oldest player to receive his first call-up to the team in 50 years.

== Club career ==
=== Early career ===
Butez started playing football at the local club from his home town of Merris. Two years later, he made the move to the Lille academy, who had scouted him down during a futsal tournament in which he was named best goalkeeper. In the 2012–13 season, he gained his first playing minutes for Lille B in the CFA, the fourth tier in French football. After being relegated from the CFA with the club in 2015, he won the CFA 2 title a year later. In five seasons, he made 81 official appearances for Lille's second team. In the meantime, he occasionally was part of the first team of Lille, but he never made his professional debut.

=== Mouscron ===
For the 2017–18 season, Butez was sent on a one-season loan to Mouscron, Lille's former cooperation club. On the first match day of the Belgian First Division A, he immediately made a start against Oostende (0–1 win). On the second matchday, he received a red card against Charleroi in the 82nd minute for a handball outside of the penalty area. Logan Bailly took his place in goal on the third day matchday. Butez would only make eleven appearances for the Hainaut-based club that season. After Lille terminated his contract in the summer of 2018, Mouscron permanently signed him.

In the 2018–19 season, Butez left a strong impression as Mouscron won 23 out of a possible 27 points in the spring. In the winter of 2019, he was explicitly mentioned as a potential successor to Lovre Kalinić at Gent, and in February 2019, football analyst Stéphane Pauwels had him down as a transfer target at Lyon. After the regular season, he was also rumoured as a prospect Standard Liège and Anderlecht. In the summer of 2019, he seemed like a serious option for Club Brugge, but when Mouscron had an asking price of €6 million and Club could sign Liverpool and Belgium international goalkeeper Simon Mignolet for only one million more, they chose not to continue their pursuit of Butez. Later, negotiations with Monaco, who wanted to send him on loan to Cercle Brugge if he signed, also broke down due to the high transfer price. The price had been set high because Mouscron had to share half of the transfer fee with Lille.

=== Antwerp ===
On 12 June 2020, it was announced that Butez had signed with Antwerp, where he was set to succeed Sinan Bolat, whose contract was not renewed. The transfer fee was deemed to be around €2 million. Mouscron refused an offer of €1 million not long before.

Butez made his debut for Antwerp on 8 August 2020 in the league match against his former club Mouscron. In January 2021, he was sidelined with an ankle injury, after which he was replaced by first Alireza Beiranvand and since Ortwin De Wolf, who had been loaned during the January transfer window. At the start of the play-offs, however, manager Frank Vercauteren again opted for Butez as the starter.

Under manager Brian Priske, Butez began the 2021–22 season as Antwerp's first-choice goalkeeper. In August 2021, he played a crucial role in the UEFA Europa League play-off round against Omonia, saving penalties from Jan Lecjaks and Panagiotis Zachariou in the shoot-out, which secured Antwerp's place in the group stage. However, the team struggled in the group stage, finishing last in their group with five points from 18 in matches against Eintracht Frankfurt, Fenerbahçe and Olympiacos.

In the domestic league, Antwerp recovered from a slow start, losing their first two matches, but remained in the top four from the eighth matchday onwards, with Butez's numerous saves contributing significantly to their success.

In the 2022–23 season, under new manager Mark van Bommel, Butez remained the undisputed first-choice goalkeeper, playing every minute. Strengthened by the arrival of Toby Alderweireld, Antwerp's defense improved, and Butez had an outstanding season, recording 27 clean sheets in 52 matches across all competitions. Antwerp achieved a domestic treble, winning the Belgian Pro League, the Belgian Cup and the Belgian Super Cup.

On 30 March 2024, Butez broke his hand during a match against Anderlecht, requiring surgery that ended his season early. Antwerp reportedly planned to sell him, having already signed Senne Lammens as his replacement, but interested clubs, including Ajax and Anderlecht, did not meet the asking price, and Butez remained at the club.

Under new head coach Jonas De Roeck, Butez lost his starting position to Senne Lammens. Despite his efforts to secure a transfer, no deal was finalized, and he remained at the club. Manager and analyst Hein Vanhaezebrouck described Butez as one of Belgium's top goalkeepers and expressed surprise at his demotion and failure to secure a transfer.

=== Como ===
On 7 January 2025, Butez signed a three-year contract with Como in Italy.

== International career ==
On 20 September 2026, Butez was called up to the France national team for the first time by Zinedine Zidane, replacing the injured Robin Risser. Aged 31 years and 3 months, he became the oldest player to receive his first call-up to the national team since Gérard Farison in 1976, who was 32 years and 1 month old.

== Career statistics ==
As of match played 21 November 2026

Appearances and goals by club, season and competition
| Club | Season | League | | | Cup | | Europe | | Other | | Total | |
| Club | Season | Division | Apps | Goals | Apps | Goals | Apps | Goals | Apps | Goals | Apps | Goals |
|---|---|---|---|---|---|---|---|---|---|---|---|---|
| Lille II | 2012–13 | CFA | 4 | 0 | — | | — | | — | | 4 | 0 |
| Lille II | 2013–14 | CFA | 8 | 0 | — | | — | | — | | 8 | 0 |
| Lille II | 2014–15 | CFA | 28 | 0 | — | | — | | — | | 28 | 0 |
| Lille II | 2015–16 | CFA 2 | 18 | 0 | — | | — | | — | | 18 | 0 |
| Lille II | 2016–17 | CFA | 23 | 0 | — | | — | | — | | 23 | 0 |
| Lille II | Total | | 81 | 0 | — | | — | | — | | 81 | 0 |
| Mouscron (loan) | 2017–18 | Belgian Pro League | 10 | 0 | 1 | 0 | — | | — | | 11 | 0 |
| Mouscron | 2018–19 | Belgian Pro League | 30 | 0 | 1 | 0 | — | | — | | 31 | 0 |
| Mouscron | 2019–20 | Belgian Pro League | 16 | 0 | 0 | 0 | — | | — | | 16 | 0 |
| Mouscron | Mouscron total | | 56 | 0 | 2 | 0 | — | | — | | 58 | 0 |
| Antwerp | 2020–21 | Belgian Pro League | 24 | 0 | 0 | 0 | 5 (Note: Appearances in UEFA Europa League) | 0 | — | | 29 | 0 |
| Antwerp | 2021–22 | Belgian Pro League | 40 | 0 | 0 | 0 | 8 | 0 | — | | 48 | 0 |
| Antwerp | 2022–23 | Belgian Pro League | 40 | 0 | 6 | 0 | 6 (Note: Appearances in UEFA Europa Conference League) | 0 | — | | 52 | 0 |
| Antwerp | 2023–24 | Belgian Pro League | 31 | 0 | 0 | 0 | 7 (Note: Appearances in UEFA Champions League) | 0 | 1 (Note: Appearance in Belgian Super Cup) | 0 | 39 | 0 |
| Antwerp | 2024–25 | Belgian Pro League | 0 | 0 | 2 | 0 | — | | — | | 2 | 0 |
| Antwerp | Total | | 135 | 0 | 8 | 0 | 26 | 0 | 1 | 0 | 170 | 0 |
| Como | 2024–25 | Serie A | 19 | 0 | — | | — | | — | | 19 | 0 |
| Como | 2025–26 | Serie A | 38 | 0 | 6 | 0 | — | | — | | 44 | 0 |
| Como | 2026–27 | Serie A | 9 | 0 | 0 | 0 | 3 | 0 | — | | 12 | 0 |
| Como | Total | | 66 | 0 | 6 | 0 | 3 | 0 | — | | 75 | 0 |
| Career total | | | 338 | 0 | 16 | 0 | 29 | 0 | 1 | 0 | 384 | 0 |

== Honours ==
Antwerp

- Belgian Pro League: 2022–23
- Belgian Cup: 2022–23
- Belgian Super Cup: 2023

Individual

- Belgian Goalkeeper of the Year: 2023
