= 2023 Belgian Super Cup =

Antwerp	Mechelen
League winners	Cup finalists
1	1
- Antwerp won 5–4 on penalties
- Date: 23 July 2023
- Venue: Bosuilstadion, Antwerp
- Referee: Lawrence Visser
- Attendance: 16,000

The 2023 Belgian Super Cup was a football match that took place on 23 July 2023 between the winners of the 2022–23 Belgian Pro League and the winners of the 2022–23 Belgian Cup. As Antwerp secured a double, winning both titles, they played the runners-up of the 2022–23 Belgian Cup, Mechelen.

== Pre-match ==
Both clubs had been able to keep most of their squad together, with the main exceptions being Willian Pacho, Calvin Stengs and Mandela Keita who all left Antwerp, and Alessio da Cruz and Dries Wouters no longer at KV Mechelen.

== Match ==
=== Summary ===
Gaëtan Coucke was forced to intervene a first time on an attempt from Jelle Bataille, but a minute later and with less than ten minutes played, Balikwisha scored from Bataille's assist. Balikwisha immediately added a second which was disallowed for offside after several minutes of VAR-review. Before half time, Antwerp again came close to doubling their lead, the crossbar preventing an own-goal by Jordi Vanlerberghe and Coucke pushing a hard strike from Gastón Ávila over the goal.

Mid-way through the second half, Ávila committed a foul on the ankle of Nikola Storm and was sent off. Ritchie De Laet scored an own-goal, resulting in the game to be decided after penalty kicks as no extra-time was permitted.

Antwerp scored once in their first three attempts, but then won. Jean Butez first saved a penalty kick, then converted one himself before also forcing Dimitri Lavalée to make a crucial error.

=== Details ===
23 July 2023
18:00 CEST

Antwerp	1–1	Mechelen
Balikwisha 9'	Report	De Laet 78' (o.g.)
Penalties
Vines (penalty missed); Ilenikhena (penalty scored); Van Den Bosch (penalty missed); Vermeeren (penalty scored); Alderweireld (penalty scored); Butez (penalty scored); Scott (penalty scored)	5–4	(penalty scored) Schoofs; (penalty scored) Mrabti; (penalty missed) Vanlerberghe; (penalty missed) Lauberbach; (penalty scored) Storm; (penalty scored) Ngoy; (penalty missed) Lavalée

Bosuilstadion, Antwerp
Attendance: 16,000
Referee: Lawrence Visser

Antwerp	Mechelen

GK	1	(France) Jean Butez
RB	34	(Belgium) Jelle Bataille
CB	23	(Belgium) Toby Alderweireld (c)
CB	2	(Belgium) Ritchie De Laet
LB	22	(Argentina) Gastón Ávila	(red card) 69'
MF	48	(Belgium) Arthur Vermeeren
MF	17	(Sweden) Jacob Ondrejka		(substituted off) 86'
MF	8	(Nigeria) Alhassan Yusuf	(yellow card) 55'
RW	11	(Kosovo) Arbnor Muja		(substituted off) 86'
CF	7	(Netherlands) Gyrano Kerk	(yellow card) 58'	(substituted off) 71'
LW	10	(Belgium) Michel-Ange Balikwisha		(substituted off) 86'
Substitutes:
CF	9	(France) George Ilenikhena		(substituted on) 86'
DF	21	(United States) Sam Vines		(substituted on) 71'
MF	32	(Germany) Christopher Scott		(substituted on) 86'
DF	33	(Belgium) Zeno Van Den Bosch		(substituted on) 86'
CF	55	(Ecuador) Anthony Valencia
CF	60	(Nigeria) Victor Udoh
GK	91	(Belgium) Senne Lammens
Manager:
(Netherlands) Mark van Bommel

GK	1	(Belgium) Gaëtan Coucke
RW	12	(Belgium) Tristan Loiseaux		(substituted off) 46'
CB	30	(Belgium) Jordi Vanlerberghe
CB	14	(Belgium) Dimitri Lavalée
LW	18	(Belgium) Alec Van Hoorenbeeck		(substituted off) 46'
MF	19	(Sweden) Kerim Mrabti	(yellow card) 85'
MF	34	(Belgium) Ngal'ayel Mukau		(substituted off) 79'
MF	16	(Belgium) Rob Schoofs (c)
LW	11	(Belgium) Nikola Storm
RW	9	(Belgium) Julien Ngoy
CF	20	(Germany) Lion Lauberbach
Substitutes:
DF	21	(Belgium) Boli Bolingoli		(substituted on) 46'
DF	23	(Belgium) Daam Foulon	(yellow card) 47'	(substituted on) 46'
FW	28	(Belgium) Frederic Soelle Soelle		(substituted on) 79'
GK	15	(Belgium) Yannick Thoelen
DF	27	(Scotland) David Bates
MF	35	(Belgium) Bilal Bafdili
MF	36	(Belgium) Dirk Asare
Manager:
(Belgium) Steven Defour

== See also ==
- 2023–24 Belgian Pro League
- 2023–24 Belgian Cup
