= Milan Smits =

Belgian footballer (born 2004)

Personal information
- Date of birth: 13 November 2004 (age 21)
- Place of birth: Berendrecht, Belgium
- Height: 1.87 m (6 ft 2 in)
- Position: Midfielder

Team information
- Current team: De Graafschap
- Number: 6

Youth career
- 2009–2013: Zandvliet Sport
- 2013–2015: Lierse
- 2015–2018: KV Mechelen
- 2018–2022: Antwerp

Senior career*
Years	Team	Apps	(Gls)
2022–2025	Young Reds Antwerp	62	(2)
2023–2025	Antwerp	7	(0)
2025–	De Graafschap	18	(1)
- * Club domestic league appearances and goals as of 28 April 2026

Milan Smits (born 13 November 2004) is a Belgian professional footballer who plays as a midfielder for Dutch Eerste Divisie club De Graafschap.

== Career ==
Smits was born in Berendrecht, Belgium, and began his footballing development at local club Zandvliet Sport, where he spent four years in the youth setup from 2009 to 2013. He then joined the academy of Lierse, remaining there for two seasons before moving to KV Mechelen in 2015. In 2018, Smits transferred to the youth department of Antwerp.

He made his Belgian Pro League debut on 5 March 2023, coming on as a late substitute in a 5–0 home win against former club Mechelen. It was his only appearance of the season. Later that month, he was given his first professional contract, to last until 2025, with the option of a further year.

Smits returned to the first team on 24 January 2024, starting in a 3–2 victory away to OH Leuven in the quarter-finals of the Belgian Cup, shortly after the departure of midfielder Arthur Vermeeren to Atlético Madrid.

On 25 June 2025, Smits joined Dutch Eerste Divisie side De Graafschap, signing a two-year contract with an option for a third. Technical director Berry Powel described him as "a versatile midfielder with great stamina," highlighting his tactical awareness and ambition to grow.

== Personal life ==
Smits's father, Björn Smits was also a footballer, who played for Royal Antwerp in the 1990s.
