= Anthony Valencia =

Ecuadorian footballer (born 2003)

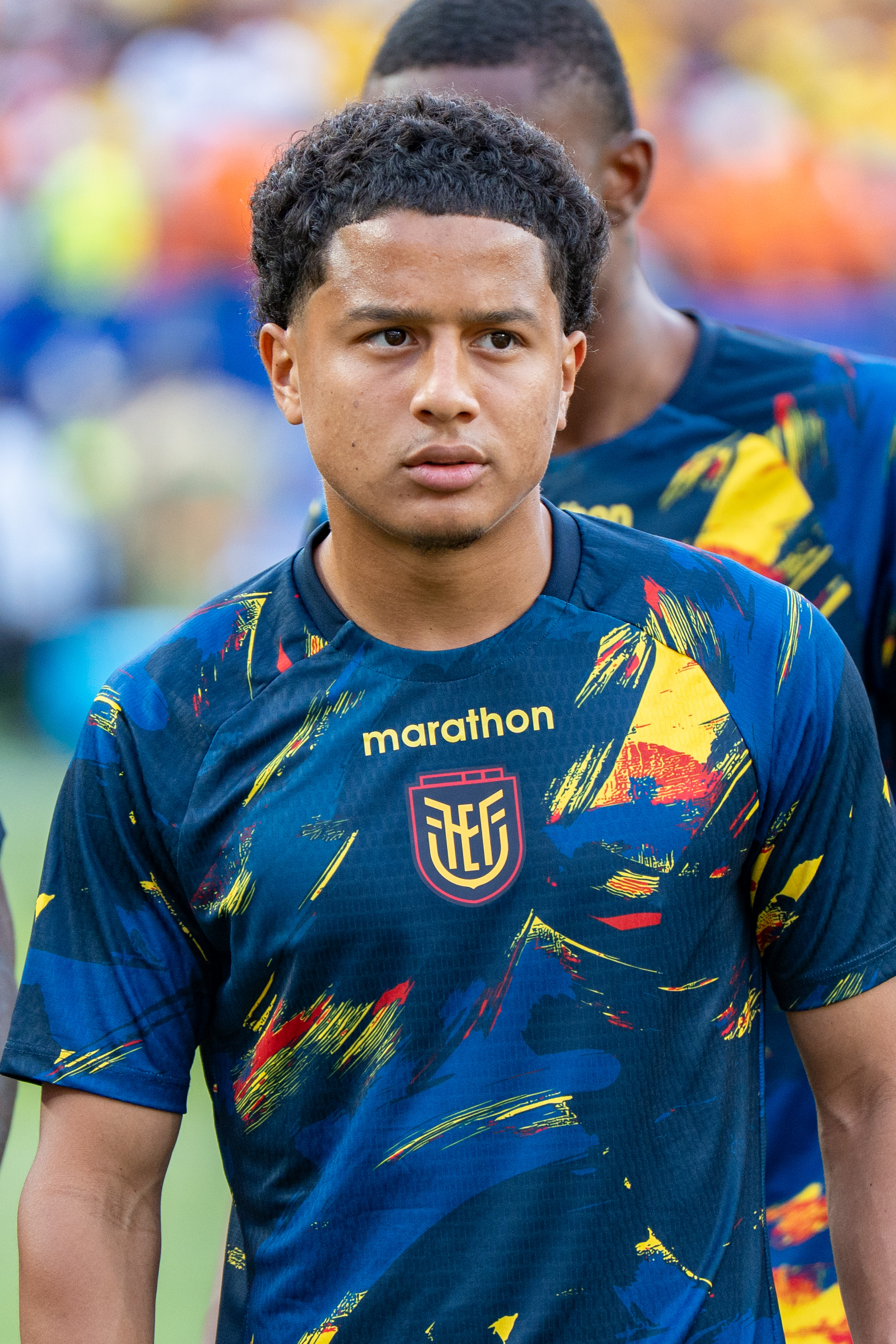
- Valencia with Ecuador in 2026

Personal information
- Full name: Anthony Lenín Valencia Bajaña
- Date of birth: 21 July 2003 (age 23)
- Place of birth: Guayaquil, Ecuador
- Height: 1.76 m (5 ft 9 in)
- Position: Midfielder

Team information
- Current team: Flamengo
- Number: 14

Youth career
- 2013–2014: Deportivo Azogues
- 2017–2020: Independiente del Valle

Senior career*
Years	Team	Apps	(Gls)
2020–2021	Independiente Juniors	28	(5)
2022	Independiente del Valle	2	(0)
2022–2026	Royal Antwerp	70	(10)
2022–2024	Young Reds Antwerp	5	(0)
2026–	Flamengo	1	(0)

International career^{‡}
2026–	Ecuador	6	(1)
- * Club domestic league appearances and goals as of 10 September 2026 ‡ National team caps and goals as of 5 October 2026

Anthony Lenín Valencia Bajaña (born 21 July 2003) is an Ecuadorian professional footballer who plays as a midfielder for Campeonato Brasileiro Série A club Flamengo and the Ecuador national team.

== Club career ==
=== Early career ===
Born in the Ecuadorean city of Guayaquil, Valencia began his footballing career with Deportivo Azogues, training with the Azogues-based side from 2013 until 2014. He went on to join Independiente del Valle in 2017, and represented the club's youth side at the U-20 Copa Libertadores, with his performances earning him a place in The Guardian's "Next Generation 2020", highlighting the best young players in world football.

=== Royal Antwerp ===
On 8 June 2022 it was announced that Valencia would join Belgian club Royal Antwerp on a 4-year deal. He notched his first assist for the club in his second appearance for the club; providing the pass for Radja Nainggolan's second goal in a 3–1 win over Norwegian opposition Lillestrøm in the UEFA Europa Conference League on 4 August 2022. The following month, he scored his first goal for the club; after an attack by Royal Antwerp, the attempted clearance from a Westerlo defender rebounded off forward Vincent Janssen and fell for Valencia, who headed the ball past goalkeeper Sinan Bolat.

=== Flamengo ===
On 1 September 2026 Brazilian club Flamengo officially announced the signing of Valencia after agreeing to pay a €5m transfer fee. He arrived at the club as substitute of is compatriot Fynn Bijsterveld who recently left Flamengo.

== International career ==
On 31 May 2026, Valencia was selected in the 26-man squad for the 2026 FIFA World Cup.

== Career statistics ==
=== Club ===
As of match played 10 September 2026

Appearances and goals by club, season and competition
Club	Season	League			National cup (Note: Includes Copa Ecuador, Belgian Cup)		Continental		Other		Total	
Club	Season	Division	Apps	Goals	Apps	Goals	Apps	Goals	Apps	Goals	Apps	Goals
Independiente Juniors	2020	Ecuadorian Serie B	10	2	—		—		0	0	10	2
Independiente Juniors	2021	Ecuadorian Serie B	18	3	—		—		0	0	18	3
Independiente Juniors	Total		28	5	—		—		0	0	28	5
Independiente del Valle	2022	LigaPro Serie A	2	0	0	0	1 (Note: Appearance in Copa Libertadores)	0	0	0	3	0
Royal Antwerp	2022–23	Belgian Pro League	10	1	1	0	3 (Note: Appearances in UEFA Europa Conference League)	1	0	0	14	2
Royal Antwerp	2023–24	Belgian Pro League	8	0	0	0	3 (Note: Appearances in UEFA Champions League)	0	0	0	11	0
Royal Antwerp	2024–25	Belgian Pro League	26	2	3	2	—		—		29	4
Royal Antwerp	2025–26	Belgian Pro League	23	4	4	0	—		—		27	4
Royal Antwerp	2026–27	Belgian Pro League	3	3	—		—		—		3	3
Royal Antwerp	Total		70	10	8	2	6	1	0	0	84	13
Young Reds Antwerp	2022–23	Belgian Division 1	1	0	—		—		—		1	0
Young Reds Antwerp	2023–24	Belgian Division 1	4	0	—		—		—		4	0
Young Reds Antwerp	Total		5	0	—		—		—		5	0
Flamengo	2026	Série A	1	0	—		0 (Note: Appearance in Copa Libertadores)	0	—		1	0
Career total			103	12	8	2	7	1	0	0	118	15

=== International ===
As of match played 5 October 2026

Appearances and goals by national team and year
National team	Year	Apps	Goals
Ecuador	2026	6	1
Total		6	1

Scores and results list Ecuador's goal tally first, score column indicates score after each Valencia goal.

List of international goals scored by Anthony Valencia
No.	Date	Venue	Cap	Opponent	Score	Result	Competition
1	30 May 2026	Sports Illustrated Stadium, Harrison, United States	2	Saudi Arabia	2–0	2–1	Friendly

== Honours ==
Royal Antwerp

- Belgian Pro League: 2022–23
- Belgian Cup: 2022–23
- Belgian Super Cup: 2023

Flamengo

- Campeonato Brasileiro Série A: 2026
