= Victor Udoh =

Nigerian footballer (2004–2026)

- Udoh with Royal Antwerp in 2024

Personal information
- Full name: Victor Akaniyene Udoh
- Date of birth: 18 October 2004
- Place of birth: Akwa Ibom State, Nigeria
- Date of death: 25 May 2026 (aged 21)
- Place of death: Abuja, Nigeria
- Height: 1.72 m (5 ft 8 in)
- Position: Forward

Youth career
- Hypebuzz
- Royal Antwerp

Senior career*
| Years | Team | Apps | (Gls) |
| 2023–2025 | Young Reds Antwerp | 27 | (12) |
| 2024–2025 | Royal Antwerp | 24 | (0) |
| 2025 | Southampton | 0 | (0) |
| 2025–2026 | Dynamo České Budějovice | 0 | (0) |
| 2025 | Dynamo České Budějovice B | 3 | (2) |
| Total | | 54 | (14) |
- * Club domestic league appearances and goals

Victor Akaniyene Udoh (18 October 2004 – 25 May 2026) was a Nigerian professional footballer who played as a forward.

Udoh was a product of the Royal Antwerp academy in Belgium and made his senior debut for the club during the 2023–24 season. In February 2025, he joined English club Southampton. Udoh left the club by mutual consent in September 2025 in an attempt to move into regular senior football. In October 2025, he joined Czech club Dynamo České Budějovice which was his last club before his death.

== Career ==
=== Royal Antwerp ===
In March 2023, 18-year-old Udoh moved from Hypebuzz FC in Abuja to Royal Antwerp of the Belgian Pro League. He signed his first professional contract there.

Udoh was first called up for first-team training by manager Mark van Bommel in July 2023. For the 2023 Belgian Super Cup on 23 July, he remained an unused substitute as his team won on penalties against Mechelen. He made his debut in the Belgian Pro League on 21 January 2024, playing the final 12 minutes of a 4–1 home win over Charleroi. Having made two substitute appearances in previous rounds, he was unused on 9 May as they lost the 2024 Belgian Cup final by a single goal to Union SG.

=== Southampton ===
On 3 February 2025, Udoh joined Premier League side Southampton on a three-and-a-half-year contract, initially joining the Under-21s squad. On 9 September, he left the club by mutual consent to facilitate a move into regular senior football.

=== Dynamo České Budějovice ===
On 23 October 2025, Udoh joined Czech National Football League side Dynamo České Budějovice on a three-year contract.

== Personal life and death ==
Udoh grew up in Madalla in the Federal Capital Territory. He returned there to distribute food and drink.

Udoh was found dead on 25 May 2026, at the age of 21, in the Nigerian capital Abuja. His death was announced the following day.

== Career statistics ==
Appearances and goals by club, season and competition
| Club | Season | League | | | National cup | | League cup | | Other | | Total | |
| Club | Season | Division | Apps | Goals | Apps | Goals | Apps | Goals | Apps | Goals | Apps | Goals |
|---|---|---|---|---|---|---|---|---|---|---|---|---|
| Young Red Antwerp | 2023–24 | Belgian National Division 1 | 21 | 12 | 0 | 0 | — | | — | | 21 | 12 |
| Young Red Antwerp | 2024–25 | Belgian National Division 1 | 6 | 0 | 0 | 0 | — | | — | | 6 | 0 |
| Young Red Antwerp | Total | | 27 | 12 | 0 | 0 | — | | — | | 27 | 12 |
| Royal Antwerp | 2023–24 | Belgian Pro League | 12 | 0 | 2 | 0 | — | | 0 | 0 | 14 | 0 |
| Royal Antwerp | 2024–25 | Belgian Pro League | 12 | 0 | 2 | 0 | — | | — | | 14 | 0 |
| Royal Antwerp | Total | | 24 | 0 | 4 | 0 | — | | 0 | 0 | 28 | 0 |
| Southampton | 2024–25 | Premier League | 0 | 0 | 0 | 0 | 0 | 0 | — | | 0 | 0 |
| Dynamo České Budějovice | 2025–26 | Czech National Football League | 0 | 0 | 0 | 0 | — | | — | | 0 | 0 |
| Dynamo České Budějovice B | 2025–26 | Bohemian Football League | 3 | 2 | — | | — | | — | | 3 | 2 |
| Career total | | | 54 | 14 | 4 | 0 | 0 | 0 | 0 | 0 | 58 | 14 |

== Honours ==
Royal Antwerp

- Belgian Super Cup: 2023
