= Senne Lammens =

Belgian footballer (born 2002)

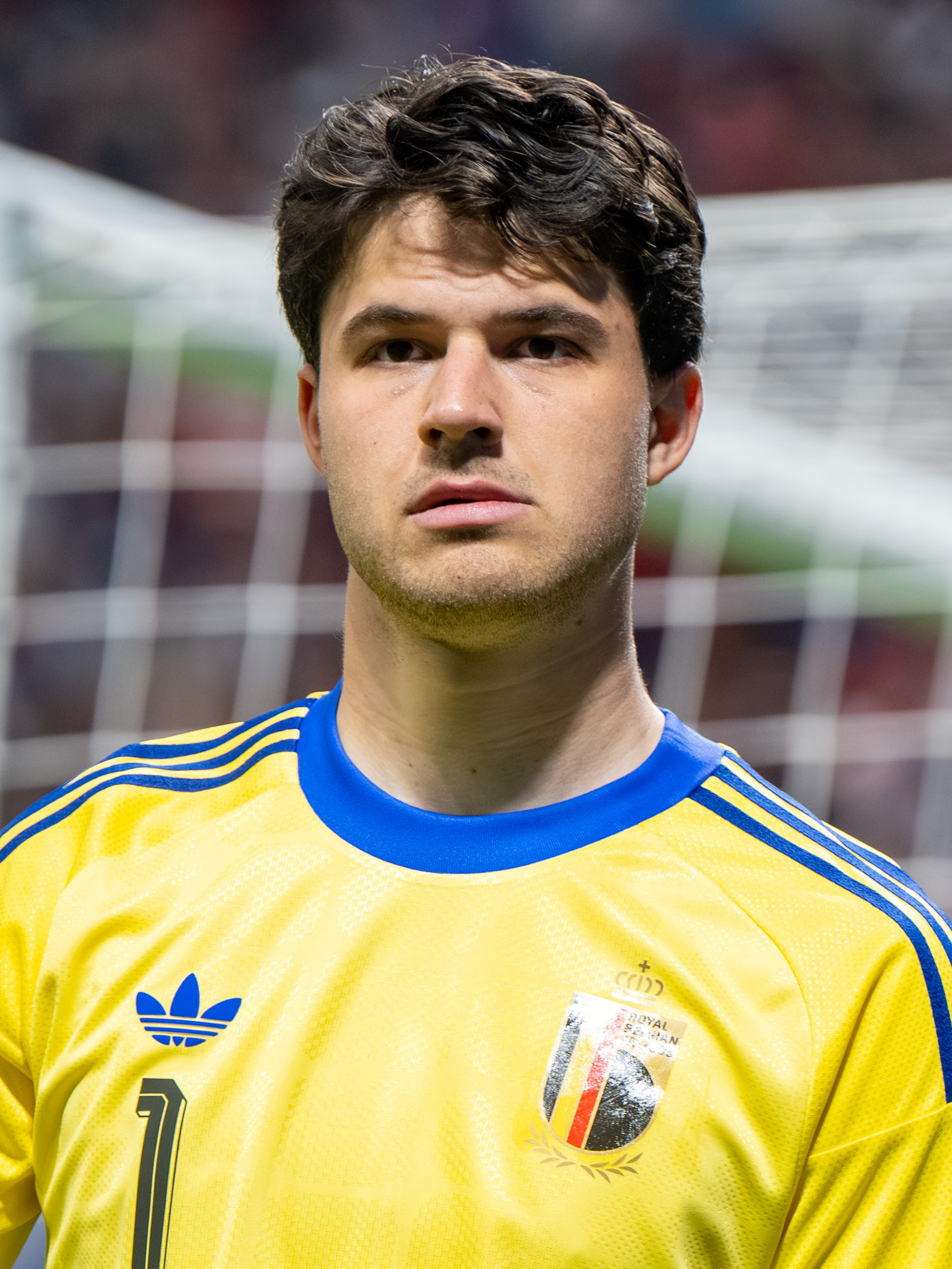
- Lammens with Belgium in 2026

Personal information
- Full name: Senne Lammens
- Date of birth: 7 July 2002 (age 24)
- Place of birth: Zottegem, East Flanders, Belgium
- Height: 1.93 m (6 ft 4 in)
- Position: Goalkeeper

Team information
- Current team: Manchester United
- Number: 1

Youth career
- KRC Bambrugge
- Dender
- –2020: Club Brugge

Senior career*
Years	Team	Apps	(Gls)
2020–2023	Club NXT	24	(0)
2020–2023	Club Brugge	2	(0)
2023–2025	Young Reds Antwerp	2	(0)
2023–2025	Royal Antwerp	53	(0)
2025–	Manchester United	43	(0)

International career^{‡}
2017	Belgium U15	1	(0)
2017–2018	Belgium U16	8	(0)
2018–2019	Belgium U17	9	(0)
2019	Belgium U18	1	(0)
2021–2024	Belgium U21	9	(0)
2025–	Belgium	8	(0)
- * Club domestic league appearances and goals as of 20:22, 22 November 2026 (UTC) ‡ National team caps and goals as of 22:00, 15 November 2026 (UTC)

Senne Lammens (Dutch: ['sɛnə 'lɑməns]; born 7 July 2002) is a Belgian professional footballer who plays as a goalkeeper for Premier League club Manchester United and the Belgium national team.

Lammens commenced his senior football career at Club Brugge. At the age of 20, he moved to Royal Antwerp on a four-year contract. In September 2025, he moved to Manchester United on a deadline day transfer.

Lammens played 28 times for Belgium at youth international level. He made his senior international debut in November 2025, and represented Belgium at the 2026 FIFA World Cup.

== Early life ==
Senne Lammens was born on 7 July 2002 in Zottegem, East Flanders.

== Club career ==
=== Club Brugge ===
Lammens came through the youth systems of KRC Bambrugge, Dender and Club Brugge. On 3 October 2018, he was included in the first-team matchday squad for the UEFA Champions League group match away against Atlético Madrid at the age of 16.

On 11 December 2019, Lammens scored a stoppage-time headed equaliser to make it 2–2 for Club Brugge's under-19 against Real Madrid's under-19 in the UEFA Youth League group stage. The result secured Brugge's progress to the knockout phase. He played for Club NXT, Club Brugge's U23 club in the First Division B during the 2020–21 season, the team's debut campaign at that level.

With first choice goalkeeper Simon Mignolet injured, Lammens started for the senior club in the Belgian Super Cup on 17 July 2021, a 3–2 victory against Genk. He restarted in the opening matchday of the Pro League season on 25 July against Eupen before appearing in a 3–0 Croky Cup victory against Deinze on 27 October. On 22 May 2022, Lammens came on as a second-half substitute for Mignolet in the final match of the champions' play-offs against Anderlecht.

=== Antwerp ===
On 8 June 2023, Lammens left Club Brugge once his contract ended and signed a four-year one with Antwerp, then-reigning Belgian champions. He made his senior Antwerp debut on 1 November 2023, starting in a 4–1 away victory at the Belgian Cup against Lierse. Coach Mark van Bommel had previously indicated that Lammens would be considered for the tie.

During the 2023–24 season, Lammens primarily served as understudy to Jean Butez – featuring again in the domestic cup – including a December draw against Lierse. By the start of the 2024–25 season, he had established himself as Antwerp's first choice goalkeeper ahead of Butez, a change noted widely in Belgian coverage.

Lammens' performances in 2024–25 drew particular notice for shot-stopping and penalty saves; by mid-February he had saved four penalties in all competitions. He was also a regular winner of Antwerp's fan-voted Player of the Month award during the season, including November 2024 and March 2025.

=== Manchester United ===
On 1 September 2025, Manchester United signed Lammens in a deadline day move from Royal Antwerp for a reported transfer fee of £18.1m. He made his debut on 4 October and kept the first clean sheet of the season for Manchester United against newly promoted Sunderland in a 2–0 home victory. In his debut season with Manchester United, Lammens was named the 2025–26 Premier League Transfer of the Season, an award recognising the player judged to have made the biggest impact for his new club in the season.

== International career ==
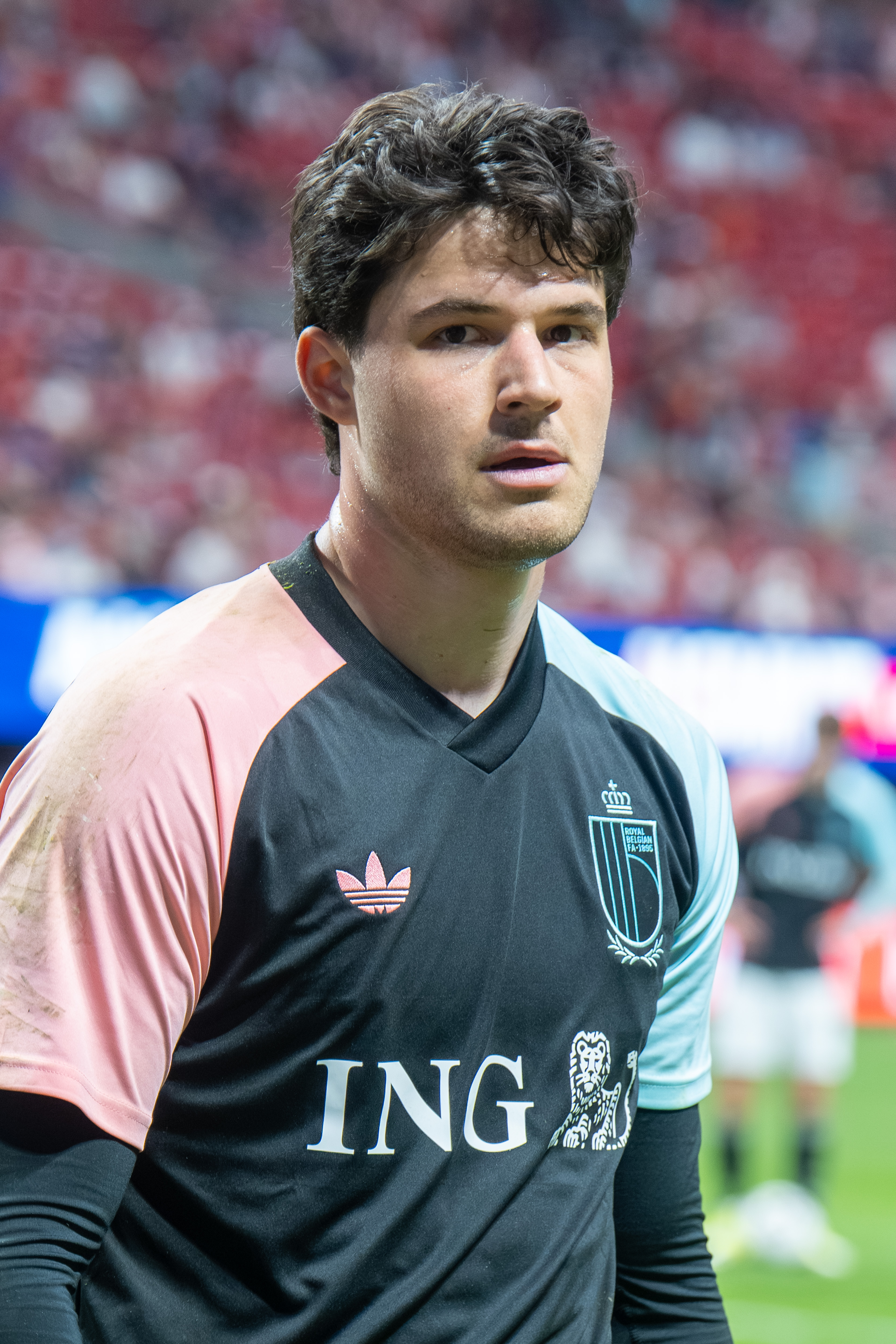
Lammens with Belgium in 2026

In March 2025, Lammens received his first call-up to the Belgian senior team for the 2024–25 UEFA Nations League play-off matches against Ukraine on 20 and 23 March 2025, respectively. On 18 November, he made his senior debut for Belgium, keeping a clean sheet in a 7–0 World Cup qualifying victory against Liechtenstein.

On 15 May 2026, Lammens was named in the Belgian squad for the 2026 FIFA World Cup. Lammens made his World Cup debut on 10 July in the quarter-finals against Spain, subbed on for the injured Thibaut Courtois. He spilled a long-range shot from Spain defender Pau Cubarsí in the 88th minute, allowing Mikel Merino to score the winning goal. Belgium lost the game 2–1 and were eliminated, while Spain would win the tournament.

== Career statistics ==
=== Club ===
As of match played 22 November 2026

Appearances and goals by club, season and competition
Club	Season	League			National cup (Note: Includes Belgian Cup, FA Cup)		League cup		Europe		Other		Total	
Club	Season	Division	Apps	Goals	Apps	Goals	Apps	Goals	Apps	Goals	Apps	Goals	Apps	Goals
Club NXT	2020–21	Belgian First Division B	13	0	—		—		—		—		13	0
Club NXT	2022–23	Challenger Pro League	11	0	—		—		—		—		11	0
Club NXT	Total		24	0	—		—		—		—		24	0
Club Brugge	2021–22	Belgian Pro League	2	0	1	0	—		0	0	1 (Note: Appearance in Belgian Super Cup)	0	4	0
Young Reds Antwerp	2023–24	National Division 1	2	0	—		—		—		—		2	0
Antwerp	2023–24	Belgian Pro League	9	0	6	0	—		1 (Note: Appearance(s) in UEFA Champions League)	0	—		16	0
Antwerp	2024–25	Belgian Pro League	40	0	3	0	—		—		1 (Note: Appearance in Belgian Pro League European competition play-offs)	0	44	0
Antwerp	2025–26	Belgian Pro League	4	0	—		—		—		—		4	0
Antwerp	Total		53	0	9	0	—		1	0	1	0	64	0
Manchester United	2025–26	Premier League	32	0	1	0	—		—		—		33	0
Manchester United	2026–27	Premier League	11	0	0	0	0	0	4	0	—		15	0
Manchester United	Total		43	0	1	0	0	0	4	0	—		48	0
Career total			124	0	11	0	0	0	5	0	2	0	142	0

=== International ===
As of match played 15 November 2026

Appearances and goals by national team and year
National team	Year	Apps	Goals
Belgium	2025	1	0
Belgium	2026	7	0
Total		8	0

== Honours ==
Club Brugge

- Belgian Super Cup: 2021

Royal Antwerp

- Belgian Super Cup: 2023

Individual

- Premier League Transfer of the Season: 2025–26
