= Mahamadou Doumbia =

Malian footballer (born 2004)

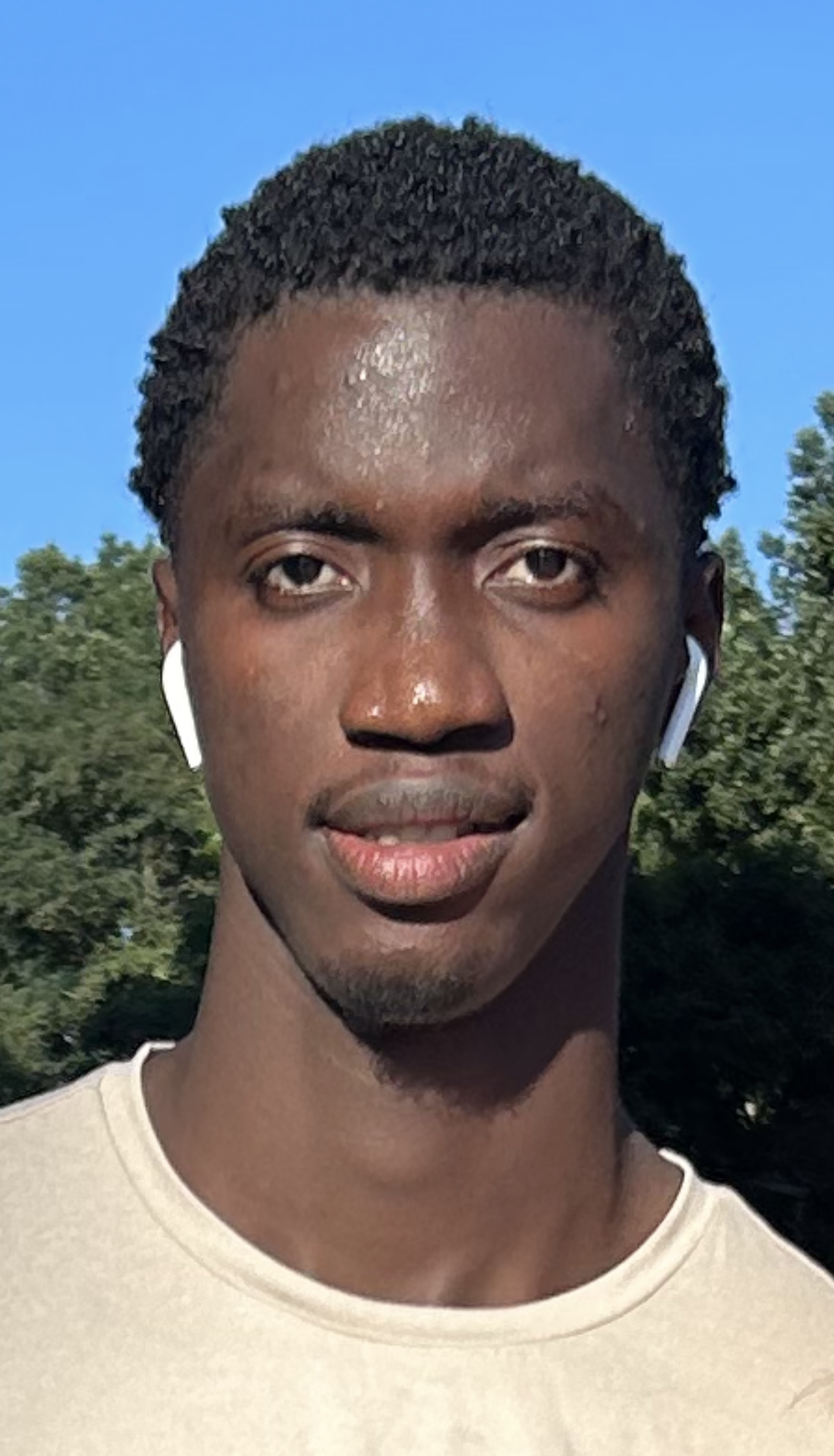
- Doumbia in August 2024

Personal information
- Date of birth: 15 May 2004 (age 22)
- Place of birth: Bamako, Mali
- Position: Midfielder

Team information
- Current team: Al-Ittihad
- Number: 17

Youth career
- –2023: JMG Academy
- 2022–2023: → Nordsjælland (loan)

Senior career*
| Years | Team | Apps | (Gls) |
| 2023–2024 | Royal Antwerp B | 14 | (2) |
| 2024–2025 | Royal Antwerp | 50 | (7) |
| 2025– | Al-Ittihad | 14 | (1) |

International career^{‡}
| 2025– | Mali | 9 | (0) |
- * Club domestic league appearances and goals as of 6 March 2026 ‡ National team caps and goals as of 31 March 2026

Mahamadou Doumbia (born 15 May 2004) is a Malian footballer who plays as a midfielder for Saudi Pro League club Al-Ittihad and the Mali national team.

Having begun his career at JMG Academy, he was loaned to Denmark's Nordsjælland before making his debut for Royal Antwerp in 2024. In 2025, he was sold to Al-Ittihad for an initial €15 million. He made his senior international debut for Mali in 2024 and was chosen for the 2025 Africa Cup of Nations.

== Club career ==
Doumbia began his career at the JMG Academy in his homeland. In July 2022, he was loaned to FC Nordsjælland of the Danish Superliga for one year with the option to buy. His only involvement with the first team was as an unused substitute on 12 October 2022 in a 5–0 win at BSF in the third round of the Danish Cup.

On 6 September 2023, Doumbia signed a four-year contract at Royal Antwerp, reigning champions of the Belgian Pro League. The transfer fee was €700,000. He made his first-team debut on 28 January 2024 as a half-time substitute for Owen Wijndal in a 1–0 loss at K.A.S. Eupen. Three days later at Standard Liège, he scored the only goal; he had started the game as Arthur Vermeeren had been sold to Atlético Madrid. On 8 February, he scored away to K.V. Oostende in the first leg of the Belgian Cup semi-finals, a 1–1 draw.

On 8 September 2025, Doumbia joined Saudi Pro League side Al-Ittihad on a five-year contract. The transfer fee was reported as €16 million plus €9 million in bonuses, making him the fourth biggest sale by Antwerp.

== International career ==
In March 2024, Doumbia was called up by Mali for two friendlies against Mauritania and Nigeria in Morocco. He was chosen for the 2025 Africa Cup of Nations, in the same country.

== Career statistics ==
=== Club ===
As of match played 18 March 2026

Appearances and goals by club, season and competition
| Club | Season | League | | | Cup | | Continental | | Other | | Total | |
| Club | Season | Division | Apps | Goals | Apps | Goals | Apps | Goals | Apps | Goals | Apps | Goals |
|---|---|---|---|---|---|---|---|---|---|---|---|---|
| Royal Antwerp B | 2023–24 | Belgian National Division 1 | 14 | 2 | — | | — | | — | | 14 | 2 |
| Royal Antwerp | 2023–24 | Belgian Pro League | 13 | 2 | 1 | 1 | — | | — | | 14 | 3 |
| Royal Antwerp | 2024–25 | Belgian Pro League | 31 | 3 | 3 | 0 | — | | — | | 34 | 3 |
| Royal Antwerp | 2025–26 | Belgian Pro League | 6 | 2 | 0 | 0 | — | | — | | 6 | 2 |
| Royal Antwerp | Total | | 50 | 7 | 4 | 1 | 0 | 0 | — | | 54 | 8 |
| Al-Ittihad | 2025–26 | Saudi Pro League | 14 | 1 | 3 | 1 | 5 (Note: Appearances in AFC Champions League Elite) | 0 | — | | 22 | 2 |
| Career total | | | 78 | 10 | 7 | 2 | 5 | 0 | 0 | 0 | 90 | 12 |

=== International ===
As of match played on 31 March 2026

Appearances and goals by national team and year
| National team | Year | Apps | Goals |
|---|---|---|---|
| Mali | 2024 | 1 | 0 |
| Mali | 2025 | 5 | 0 |
| Mali | 2026 | 3 | 0 |
| Total | | 9 | 0 |
