= Zeno Van Den Bosch =

Belgian footballer (born 2003)

Personal information
- Date of birth: 6 July 2003 (age 23)
- Place of birth: Brasschaat, Belgium
- Height: 1.92 m (6 ft 4 in)
- Position: Centre-back

Team information
- Current team: Union Berlin
- Number: 4

Youth career
- 2008–2011: Mariaburg VK
- 2011–2013: Beerschot
- 2013–2016: Lierse
- 2016–2022: Royal Antwerp

Senior career*
Years	Team	Apps	(Gls)
2022–2023	Royal Antwerp II	12	(0)
2022–2026	Royal Antwerp	116	(1)
2026–	Union Berlin	7	(0)

International career^{‡}
2020	Belgium U17	4	(0)
2024	Belgium U21	6	(0)
- * Club domestic league appearances and goals as of 1 November 2026 ‡ National team caps and goals as of 18:30, 30 November 2024 (UTC)

Zeno Van Den Bosch (Dutch pronunciation: [ˈzeːnoː vɑn dɛm ˈbɔs]; born 6 July 2003) is a Belgian professional footballer who plays as a centre-back for Bundesliga club Union Berlin. He has also played for the Belgium national under-21 football team.

== Club career ==
Van Den Bosch was born in Brasschaat, in Flanders. He trained as a youngster at Mariaburg VK, Beerschot and Lierse.

=== Royal Antwerp ===
Van Den Bosch joined up with the Royal Antwerp football academy in 2016. In September 2020, he signed his first professional contract with the club. In September 2022, his contract was extended to 2025, with the club having an option to extend it further.

On 18 January 2023, Van Den Bosch made his official debut in the club's first team: in a 3–0 league match win against KV Oostende. In April 2023, Van Den Bosch appeared as a substitute in the Belgian Cup final as Antwerp defeated KV Mechelen 2–0. Later that year, on 22 August, he made his debut in European competitions in a 1–0 victory over Greek club side AEK Athens in the play-off round of the UEFA Champions League. By the beginnings of the 2024–25 season, it was reported in the Belgian media that the contract had been extended to the summer of end of the 2025–26 season, amid reported transfer interest in the player from clubs in Portugal, Italy and Germany, such as Mainz and Torino. He scored his first league goal for Antwerp on 9 November 2024, in a 2–1 away win against KV Kortrijk.

=== Union Berlin ===
On 15 June 2026, Van Den Bosch signed for Bundesliga side Union Berlin.

== International career ==
Van Den Bosch featured for the Belgium national under-21 football team in a 3–1 home win against Malta U21 on 21 March 2024 in a UEFA European U21 Championship qualifying match.

== Career statistics ==
As of match played 1 November 2026

Appearances and goals by club, season and competition
Club	Season	League			National cup (Note: Includes Belgian Cup, DFB-Pokal)		Europe		Other		Total	
Club	Season	Division	Apps	Goals	Apps	Goals	Apps	Goals	Apps	Goals	Apps	Goals
Royal Antwerp	2022–23	Belgian Pro League	7	0	2	0	0	0	–		9	0
Royal Antwerp	2023–24	Belgian Pro League	33	0	6	2	5 (Note: Appearances in UEFA Champions League)	0	1 (Note: Appearance in Belgian Super Cup)	0	45	2
Royal Antwerp	2024–25	Belgian Pro League	41	1	5	0	—		—		46	1
Royal Antwerp	2025–26	Belgian Pro League	35	0	5	0	—		—		40	0
Royal Antwerp	Total		116	1	18	2	5	0	1	0	140	3
Union Berlin	2026–27	Bundesliga	7	0	2	1	—		—		9	1
Career total			123	1	20	3	5	0	1	0	149	4

== Honours ==
Royal Antwerp

- Belgian Pro League: 2022–23
- Belgian Cup: 2022–23
- Belgian Super Cup: 2023
