= Semm Renders =

Belgian footballer (born 2007)

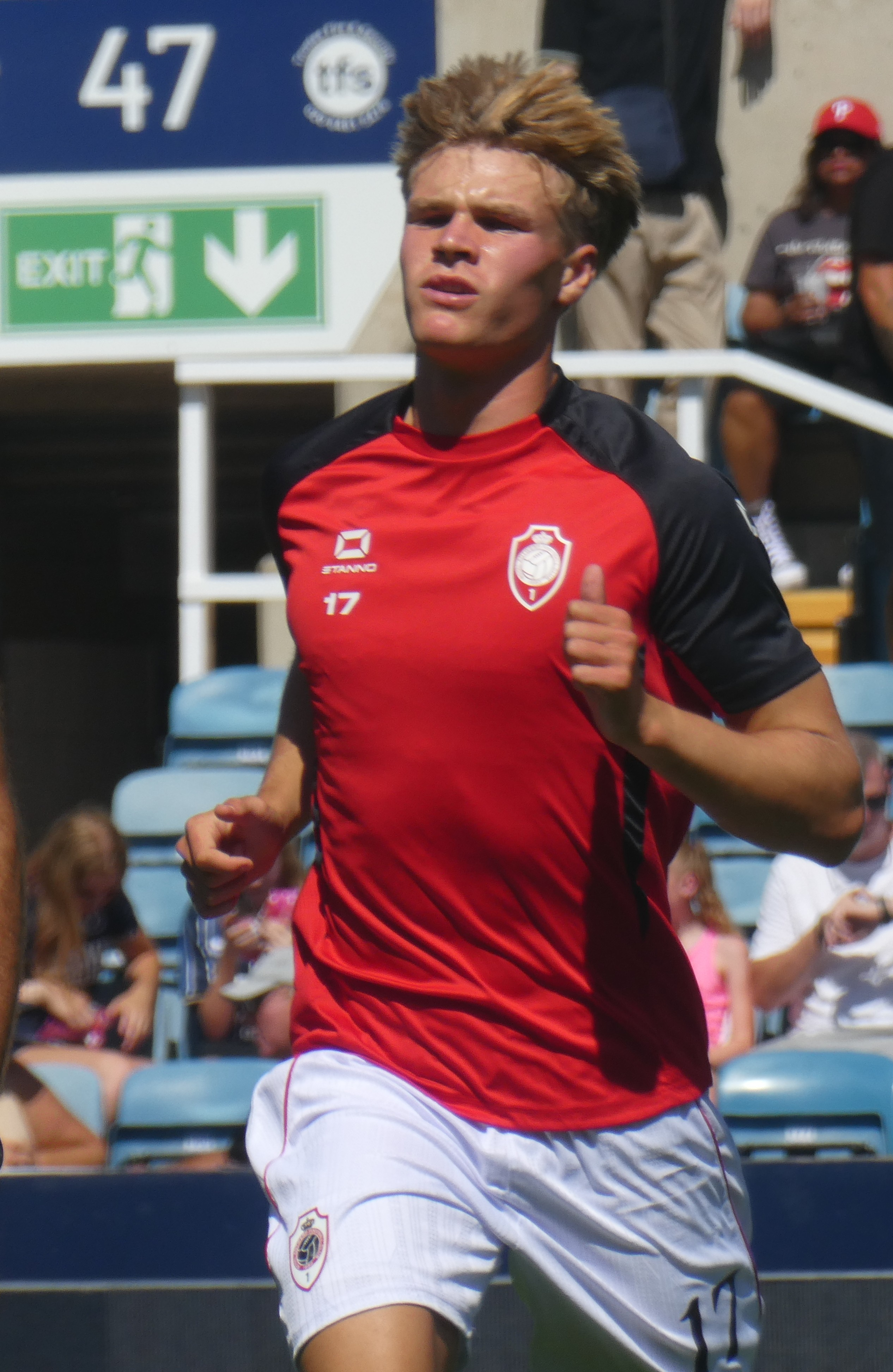

Personal information
- Date of birth: 17 December 2007 (age 18)
- Place of birth: Belgium
- Position: Right-back

Team information
- Current team: Antwerp
- Number: 17

Youth career
- Antwerp

Senior career*
| Years | Team | Apps | (Gls) |
| 2024– | Young Reds | 16 | (1) |
| 2024– | Antwerp | 33 | (0) |

International career^{‡}
| 2024 | Belgium U18 | 2 | (0) |
| 2026– | Belgium U19 | 3 | (0) |
| 2025– | Belgium U21 | 2 | (0) |
- * Club domestic league appearances and goals as of 1 June 2026 ‡ National team caps and goals as of 23:03, 24 September 2026 (UTC)

Semm Renders (17 December 2007) is a Belgian footballer who plays as a right-back for Belgian Pro League club Royal Antwerp

== Club career ==
=== Antwerp ===
In August 2024, Renders signed his first professional contract with Royal Antwerp F.C. He was given his professional debut as a 16-year-old by Antwerp coach Jonas De Roeck, coming on as substitute against Cercle Brugge on 6 October 2024, likewise coming off the bench in Antwerp's next two matches against Oud-Heverlee Leuven and Standard Liege.

== International career ==
Renders made his first appearance at any level for Belgium starting in a 1–0 win for the national under-18s team over Germany in Oliva Nova on 15 November 2024.

He came on as a substitute in a 1–0 loss to Poland three days later at the same venue.
