= Michel-Ange Balikwisha =

Footballer (born 2001)

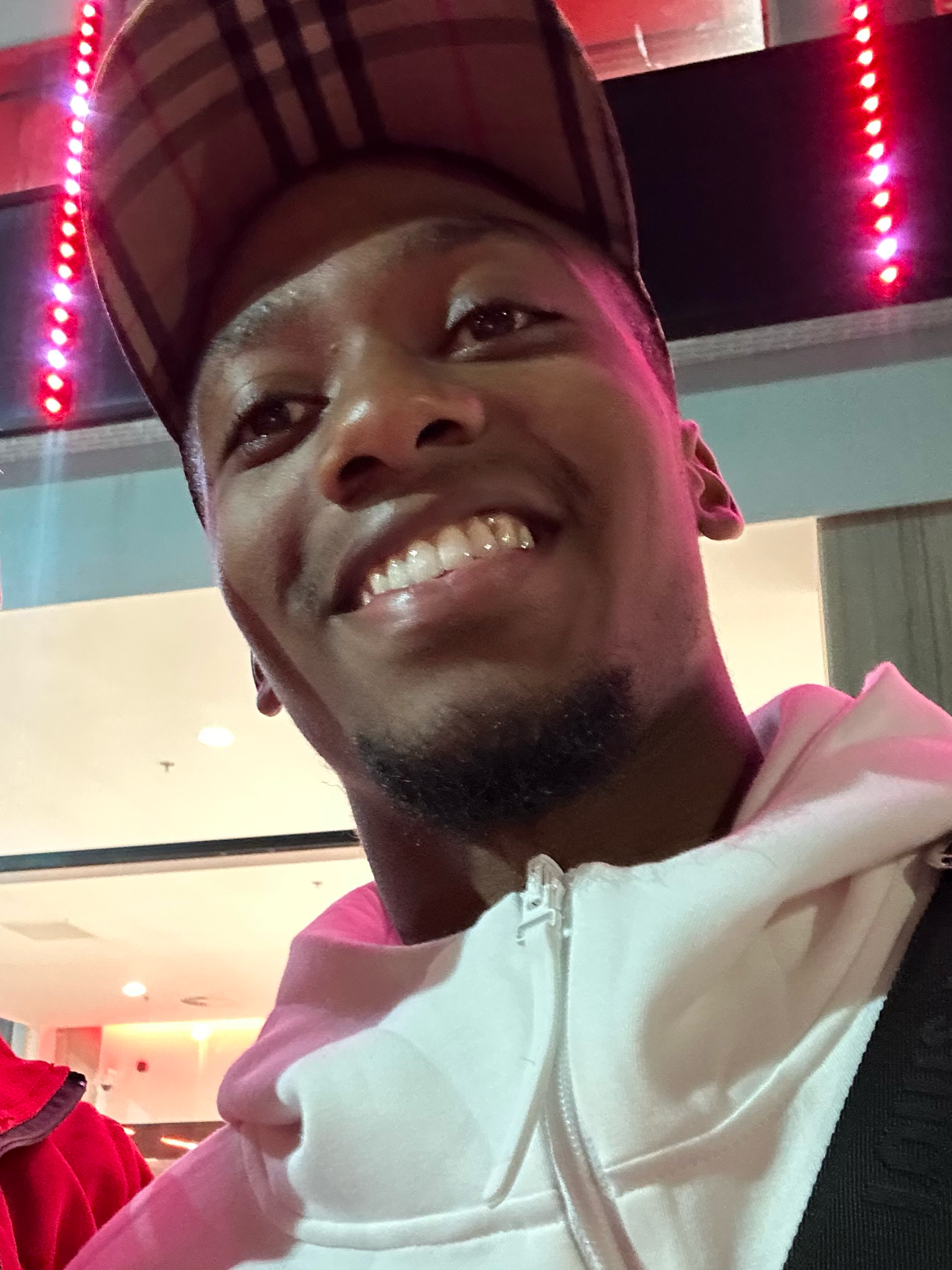
- Balikwisha in 2023

Personal information
- Full name: Michel-Ange Sumaï N'Koyi Limpata Balikwisha
- Birth name: Michel-Ange Sumai Balikwisha
- Date of birth: 10 May 2001 (age 25)
- Place of birth: Ghent, Belgium
- Height: 1.78 m (5 ft 10 in)
- Position: Forward

Team information
- Current team: Gent (on loan from Celtic)
- Number: 7

Youth career
- –2014: Anderlecht
- 2014–2020: Standard Liège

Senior career*
Years	Team	Apps	(Gls)
2020–2021	Standard Liège	32	(9)
2021–2025	Antwerp	118	(23)
2025–	Celtic	7	(0)
2026–	→ Gent (loan)	6	(1)

International career^{‡}
2017	Belgium U16	4	(1)
2018	Belgium U17	5	(1)
2019	Belgium U18	1	(0)
2019	Belgium U19	3	(0)
2021–2023	Belgium U21	10	(1)
2025–	DR Congo	5	(0)
- * Club domestic league appearances and goals as of 22:45, 18 October 2026 (UTC) ‡ National team caps and goals as of 19:46, 6 January 2026 (UTC)

Michel-Ange Sumaï N'Koyi Limpata Balikwisha (born 10 May 2001) is a professional footballer who plays as a forward for Belgian Pro League side Gent, on loan from Scottish Premiership club Celtic. Born in Belgium, he plays for the DR Congo national team.

== Club career ==
Balikwisha made his professional debut for Standard Liège on 20 September 2020 in a Belgian Pro League game against KV Kortrijk.

=== Royal Antwerp ===
On 4 July 2021, Balikwisha joined Royal Antwerp on a long-term contract for an undisclosed fee.

He was part of the squad that won a domestic double during the 2022–23 season, including the club's first league title in 66 years.

On 23 July 2023, Balikwisha scored a goal in the Belgian Super Cup against Mechelen. Antwerp would win on penalties to claim the trophy for the first time in their history.

On 30 August 2023, he helped the club secure a spot in the group stage of the UEFA Champions League for the first time ever, by scoring a goal in the second leg of their 3–1 aggregate victory over AEK Athens in the play-off round. He scored in Antwerp's first home match in the Champions League proper on 4 October, putting his side 2–0 up against Shakhtar Donetsk, but would squander the lead and fall to a 3–2 defeat.

=== Celtic ===
In July 2024, Scottish club Celtic approached Royal Antwerp to sign Balikwisha. Celtic made a second attempt to sign him on 20 August 2025 and, although the player agreed personal terms, it was reported that internal issues at his club were preventing the move from happening.

Celtic finally completed the signing of Balikwisha on 28 August 2025, on a five-year contract. Balikwisha made his debut for the club three days later against Rangers in the Scottish Premiership.

=== Gent ===
On 29 August 2026, Balikwisha joined Gent on loan until the end of the season.

== International career ==
Born in Belgium, Balikwisha is of DR Congolese descent. He was a youth international for Belgium.

On 1 November 2025, Balikwisha received his first call-up to the DR Congo national team for the 2026 FIFA World Cup qualifying play-offs. His request to switch international allegiance to the DR Congo was approved by FIFA on 11 November and he made his debut in the World Cup playoff against Nigeria, scoring in a penalty shootout that helped the Leopards progress to the Intercontinental playoffs.

== Personal life ==
Balikwisha is the brother of the footballer William Balikwisha.

== Career statistics ==
=== Club ===
As of match played 22 October 2026

Appearances and goals by club, season and competition
Club	Season	League			National cup (Note: Includes Belgian Cup)		League cup (Note: Includes Scottish League Cup)		Europe		Other		Total	
Club	Season	Division	Apps	Goals	Apps	Goals	Apps	Goals	Apps	Goals	Apps	Goals	Apps	Goals
Standard Liège	2020–21	Belgian Pro League	32	9	2	0	—		6 (Note: Appearances in UEFA Europa League)	0	—		40	9
Antwerp	2021–22	Belgian Pro League	32	4	1	0	—		5	1	—		38	5
Antwerp	2022–23	Belgian Pro League	33	7	5	2	—		4 (Note: Appearances in UEFA Europa Conference League)	1	—		42	10
Antwerp	2023–24	Belgian Pro League	33	7	3	0	—		7 (Note: Appearances in UEFA Champions League)	2	1 (Note: Appearance in Belgian Super Cup)	1	44	10
Antwerp	2024–25	Belgian Pro League	16	4	1	0	—		—		—		17	4
Antwerp	2025–26	Belgian Pro League	4	1	—		—		—		—		4	1
Antwerp	Total		118	23	10	2	—		16	4	1	1	145	30
Celtic	2025–26	Scottish Premiership	7	0	1	0	2	0	4	0	—		14	0
Celtic	2026–27	Scottish Premiership	0	0	—		0	0	0 (Note: Appearances in UEFA Champions League)	0	—		0	0
Celtic	Total		7	0	1	0	2	0	4	0	—		14	0
Gent (loan)	2026–27	Belgian Pro League	6	1	1	0	—		2 (Note: Appearances in UEFA Conference League)	0	—		9	1
Career total			163	33	14	2	2	0	28	4	1	1	208	40

== Honours ==
Royal Antwerp

- Belgian Pro League: 2022–23
- Belgian Cup: 2022–23
- Belgian Super Cup: 2023

Celtic

- Scottish Premiership: 2025-26
