= Rosen Bozhinov =

Bulgarian footballer (born 2005)

Personal information
- Full name: Rosen Petkov Bozhinov
- Date of birth: 23 January 2005 (age 21)
- Place of birth: Knezha, Bulgaria
- Height: 1.93 m (6 ft 4 in)
- Position: Defender

Team information
- Current team: Pisa
- Number: 2

Youth career
- 2011–2016: Miziya Knezha
- 2016–2021: Etar
- 2021–2022: CSKA Sofia

Senior career*
Years	Team	Apps	(Gls)
2022	CSKA Sofia	2	(0)
2022–2023	CSKA 1948 III	39	(3)
2022–2024	CSKA 1948 II	12	(1)
2024	CSKA 1948	16	(0)
2024–2025	Young Reds	6	(0)
2024–2026	Antwerp	24	(1)
2026–	Pisa	12	(0)

International career^{‡}
2021–2022	Bulgaria U17	3	(0)
2022–2023	Bulgaria U18	4	(0)
2022–2024	Bulgaria U19	5	(0)
2024	Bulgaria U20	1	(0)
2024–	Bulgaria U21	5	(0)
2025–	Bulgaria	6	(0)
- * Club domestic league appearances and goals as of 10:14, 8 September 2026 (UTC) ‡ National team caps and goals as of 20:01, 16 November 2026 (UTC)

Rosen Petkov Bozhinov (Bulgarian: Росен Петков Божинов; born 23 January 2005) is a Bulgarian professional footballer who plays as a defender for Serie B club Pisa and the Bulgaria national team.

== Club career ==
Born in Knezha, he started his youth career in local Miziya Knezha, then moved to Etar, before joining CSKA Sofia in 2021. On 30 April 2022, he made his professional debut for CSKA in a league match against Ludogorets Razgrad.

On 17 June 2022, he left CSKA Sofia to join CSKA 1948. In January 2024, he underwent a trial at Polish club Śląsk Wrocław, but returned to his parent club after two weeks. On 16 February 2024, he re-signed with CSKA 1948. Two days later, he completed his professional debut for the team in a league match against Etar.

On 21 June 2024, Bozhinov joined Belgium club Antwerp, signing a contract until June 2028. He was given his first-team debut at Antwerp by coach Jonas De Roeck, coming on as substitute against Cercle Brugge on 6 October 2024.

On 15 January 2026, Bozhinov moved to Pisa in Italy.

== International career ==
In June 2025, Bozhinov received his first call-up to the senior national team for a friendly match against Greece, but remained an unused substitute. In August 2025, he was once again included in the national team's roster, for the 2026 World Cup qualifiers against Spain and Georgia. On 4 September 2025, Bozhinov earned his first cap, appearing as a substitute for Fabian Nürnberger during the second half of a 3–0 loss against the reigning European champions.

== Career statistics ==
=== Club ===
As of 17 August 2025

Appearances and goals by club, season and competition
Club	Season	League			National cup (Note: Includes Bulgarian Cup, Belgian Cup)		Europe		Other		Total	
Club	Season	Division	Apps	Goals	Apps	Goals	Apps	Goals	Apps	Goals	Apps	Goals
CSKA Sofia	2021–22	First League	2	0	0	0	0	0	—		2	0
CSKA 1948 III	2022–23	Third League	29	2	—		—		—		29	2
CSKA 1948 III	2023–24	Third League	10	1	—		—		—		10	1
CSKA 1948 III	Total		39	3	—		—		—		39	3
CSKA 1948 II	2022–23	Second League	2	0	—		—		—		2	0
CSKA 1948 II	2023–24	Second League	10	1	—		—		—		10	1
CSKA 1948 II	Total		12	1	—		—		—		12	1
CSKA 1948	2023–24	First League	16	0	1	0	0	0	1	0	18	0
Young Reds	2024–25	Belgian Division 1	5	0	—		—		—		5	0
Antwerp	2024–25	Belgian Pro League	8	0	1	0	—		—		9	0
Antwerp	2025–26	Belgian Pro League	4	0	0	0	—		—		4	0
Antwerp	Total		12	0	1	0	—		—		13	0
Career total			86	4	2	0	0	0	1	0	!89	4

=== International ===
As of match played 16 November 2026

Appearances and goals by national team and year
National team	Year	Apps	Goals
Bulgaria	2025	3	0
Bulgaria	2026	3	0
Total		6	0
