= Jelle Bataille =

Belgian footballer (born 1999)

Personal information
- Date of birth: 20 May 1999 (age 27)
- Place of birth: Tournai, Belgium
- Height: 1.91 m (6 ft 3 in)
- Position: Right-back

Team information
- Current team: Maccabi Haifa
- Number: 25

Youth career
- 2006–2011: Oostende
- 2011–2013: Club Brugge
- 2013–2017: Oostende

Senior career*
Years	Team	Apps	(Gls)
2017–2021	Oostende	86	(4)
2021–2025	Antwerp	127	(1)
2025–	Maccabi Haifa	33	(0)

International career
2016–2017	Belgium U18	5	(1)
2017	Belgium U19	6	(1)
2019–2020	Belgium U21	6	(1)
- * Club domestic league appearances and goals as of 23 June 2026

Jelle Bataille (born 20 May 1999) is a Belgian professional footballer who plays as a right-back for the Israeli Premier League club Maccabi Haifa.

== Club career ==
Bataille scored his first goal in the Belgian First Division A on 9 May 2018 at home against Lokeren, on an assist from Robbie D'Haese, a player he grew through the youth ranks of the club with.

On 18 June 2021, he signed a three-year contract with Antwerp.

On 17 July 2025, he signed a two-year contract in Maccabi Haifa.

== Honours ==
Royal Antwerp

- Belgian Pro League: 2022-23
- Belgian Cup: 2022–23
- Belgian Super Cup: 2023
