= Arthur Vermeeren =

Belgian footballer (born 2005)

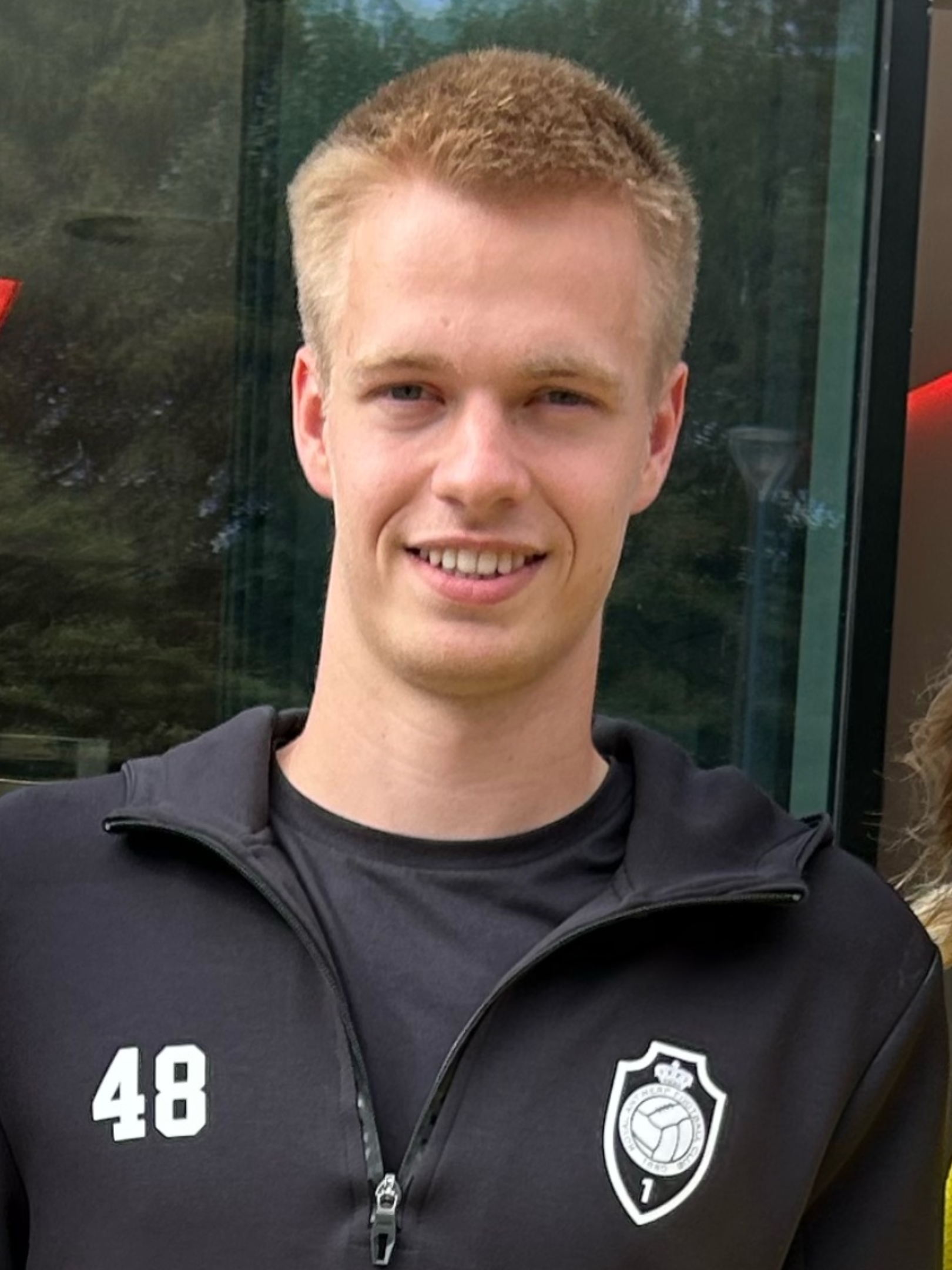
- Vermeeren with Royal Antwerp in 2023

Personal information
- Full name: Arthur Denis Vermeeren
- Date of birth: 7 February 2005 (age 21)
- Place of birth: Lier, Belgium
- Height: 1.80 m (5 ft 11 in)
- Position: Central midfielder

Team information
- Current team: Royal Antwerp (on loan from RB Leipzig)
- Number: 48

Youth career
- 2018–2022: Royal Antwerp

Senior career*
| Years | Team | Apps | (Gls) |
| 2022 | Royal Antwerp II | 6 | (1) |
| 2022–2024 | Royal Antwerp | 47 | (2) |
| 2024–2025 | Atlético Madrid | 5 | (0) |
| 2024–2025 | → RB Leipzig (loan) | 15 | (0) |
| 2025– | RB Leipzig | 14 | (0) |
| 2025–2026 | → Marseille (loan) | 20 | (0) |
| 2026– | → Royal Antwerp (loan) | 0 | (0) |

International career^{‡}
| 2021–2022 | Belgium U17 | 10 | (0) |
| 2022 | Belgium U18 | 3 | (0) |
| 2023 | Belgium U19 | 3 | (0) |
| 2023– | Belgium U21 | 14 | (1) |
| 2023– | Belgium | 6 | (0) |
- * Club domestic league appearances and goals as of 17:24, 29 August 2026 (UTC) ‡ National team caps and goals as of 15:40, 18 November 2026 (UTC)

Arthur Denis Vermeeren (Dutch pronunciation: [ˈɑrtyr vərˈmeːrə(n)]; born 7 February 2005) is a Belgian professional footballer who plays as a central midfielder for Belgian Pro League club Royal Antwerp, on loan from Bundesliga club RB Leipzig, and the Belgium national team.

== Club career ==
=== Antwerp ===
==== 2022–23 season ====
Vermeeren made his professional debut for Royal Antwerp as a second-half substitute in the 2022–23 UEFA Europa Conference League at home in Antwerp at the Bosuilstadion on the 59th minute in a 2–0 second leg win against Lillestrøm SK on 11 August 2022. He told the media after his debut that he could not imagine a better debut. He received praise from coach Mark Van Bommel who was quoted as saying “Arthur is a smart footballer, a fun guy to work with. He is eager to learn and show he can play. So he will get some playing time. He enjoyed it, I think. It's nice to see."

In April 2023, Vermeeren was a starter in the 2023 Belgian Cup Final as Antwerp defeated KV Mechelen 2–0. On 14 May, he scored his first goal for Antwerp in a 3–2 win over Club Brugge during the Champions' play-off.

==== 2023–24 season ====
On 23 July 2023, Vermeeren was a starter in the Belgian Super Cup as Antwerp defeated KV Mechelen on penalty kicks. On 19 September, he made his Champions League debut in a 5–0 defeat against Barcelona. On 13 December, he scored his first Champions League goal in a 3–2 victory in the return leg against the same opponent. Vermeeren was awarded Man of the Match for his performance and told reporters in the post-match interview: "Today, a dream came true. I am very happy and I hope I have made my family proud." Vermeeren ended his season at Antwerp with 8 G/A in 32 games in all competitions. Prior to his departure from the club, he made 64 consecutive starts across all competitions for the club, playing 99.4% of the available minutes during that run.

=== Atlético Madrid ===
On 26 January 2024, Vermeeren joined La Liga club Atlético Madrid on a six-and-a-half-year contract. The deal reportedly included a €18 million transfer fee, with up to €5 million in add-ons, and Royal Antwerp keeping a 10% sell-on clause.

=== RB Leipzig ===
On 26 August 2024, Vermeeren joined Bundesliga club RB Leipzig on a season-long loan, with an obligation to buy once certain conditions were met. On 17 January 2025, Leipzig confirmed that the conditions had been met, and Vermeeren had joined the club permanently on a deal until 2029.

==== Loan to Marseille ====
On 31 August 2025, Vermeeren was loaned to Marseille in France for the season.

==== Loan to Antwerp ====
On 3 September 2026, Vermeeren returned to Antwerp on loan from Leipzig for the 2026–27 season.

== International career ==
Vermeeren played for the Belgian youth teams, featuring for the Belgium U17 in the 2022 European Under-17 Championship. He debuted for the Belgian senior squad on 13 October 2023, at the same time as his at the time Royal Antwerp teammate Mandela Keita, coming off the bench in the 87th minute to replace Johan Bakayoko, in a 3–2 away victory over Austria during the UEFA Euro 2024 qualifying. On 28 May 2024, Vermeeren was named in the 25-man squad for the UEFA Euro 2024.

== Career statistics ==
=== Club ===
As of match played 29 August 2026

Appearances and goals by club, season and competition
| Club | Season | League | | | National cup (Note: Includes Belgian Cup, DFB-Pokal, Coupe de France) | | Europe | | Other | | Total | |
| Club | Season | Division | Apps | Goals | Apps | Goals | Apps | Goals | Apps | Goals | Apps | Goals |
|---|---|---|---|---|---|---|---|---|---|---|---|---|
| Royal Antwerp II | 2022–23 | Belgian National Division 1 | 6 | 1 | — | | — | | — | | 6 | 1 |
| Royal Antwerp | 2022–23 | Belgian Pro League | 26 | 1 | 6 | 0 | 2 (Note: Appearances in UEFA Europa Conference League) | 0 | — | | 34 | 1 |
| Royal Antwerp | 2023–24 | Belgian Pro League | 21 | 1 | 2 | 0 | 7 (Note: Appearances in UEFA Champions League) | 0 | 1 (Note: Appearance in Belgian Super Cup) | 0 | 31 | 1 |
| Royal Antwerp | Total | | 47 | 2 | 8 | 0 | 9 | 0 | 1 | 0 | 65 | 2 |
| Atlético Madrid | 2023–24 | La Liga | 5 | 0 | 0 | 0 | 0 | 0 | — | | 5 | 0 |
| RB Leipzig (loan) | 2024–25 | Bundesliga | 15 | 0 | 2 | 0 | 5 | 0 | — | | 22 | 0 |
| RB Leipzig | 2024–25 | Bundesliga | 13 | 0 | 2 | 0 | 2 | 0 | — | | 17 | 0 |
| RB Leipzig | 2026–27 | Bundesliga | 1 | 0 | 1 | 0 | — | | — | | 2 | 0 |
| RB Leipzig | Leipzig total | | 29 | 0 | 5 | 0 | 7 | 0 | — | | 41 | 0 |
| Marseille (loan) | 2025–26 | Ligue 1 | 20 | 0 | 1 | 0 | 5 | 0 | 0 | 0 | 26 | 0 |
| Royal Antwerp (loan) | 2026–27 | Belgian Pro League | 0 | 0 | 0 | 0 | — | | — | | 0 | 0 |
| Career total | | | 107 | 3 | 14 | 0 | 21 | 0 | 1 | 0 | 143 | 3 |

=== International ===
As of match played 17 November 2024

Appearances and goals by national team and year
| National team | Year | Apps | Goals |
|---|---|---|---|
| Belgium | 2023 | 2 | 0 |
| Belgium | 2024 | 4 | 0 |
| Total | | 6 | 0 |

== Honours ==
Royal Antwerp

- Belgian Pro League: 2022–23
- Belgian Cup: 2022–23
- Belgian Super Cup: 2023

Individual

- Belgian Young Professional Footballer of the Year: 2022–23
- Belgian Youngster of the Year: 2023
- Dominique D'Onofrio Award: 2023
