= 2021–22 KV Mechelen season =

K.V. Mechelen
2021–22 season
- Manager: Wouter Vrancken
- Stadium: Achter de Kazerne
- Belgian First Division A: 7th
- Belgian Cup: Quarter-finals
- Top goalscorer: League: Nikola Storm (15); All: Nikola Storm (16)
Home colours	Away colours	Third colours

The 2021–22 season was the 118th season in the existence of K.V. Mechelen and the club's third consecutive season in the top flight of Belgian football. In addition to the domestic league, Mechelen participated in this season's edition of the Belgian Cup.

== Players ==
=== First-team squad ===
As of 2 February 2022

Note: Flags indicate national team as defined under FIFA eligibility rules; some limited exceptions apply. Players may hold more than one non-FIFA nationality.

No.	Pos.	Nation	Player
1	GK	BEL	Gaëtan Coucke
2	DF	BEL	Iebe Swers
3	DF	NED	Lucas Bijker
4	MF	BEL	Dries Wouters (on loan from Schalke 04)
5	DF	IDN	Sandy Walsh
6	MF	BEL	Jannes Van Hecke
7	MF	BEL	Geoffry Hairemans
8	MF	BEL	Onur Kaya (captain)
10	FW	FRA	Élie Youan (on loan from St. Gallen)
11	FW	BEL	Nikola Storm
14	FW	BEL	Hugo Cuypers
15	GK	BEL	Yannick Thoelen
16	MF	BEL	Rob Schoofs
17	MF	CMR	Samuel Gouet

No.	Pos.	Nation	Player
18	DF	BEL	Alec Van Hoorenbeeck
19	FW	SWE	Kerim Mrabti
20	FW	SWE	Gustav Engvall
21	FW	BEL	Niklo Dailly
22	DF	BEL	Dylan Dassy
23	DF	FRA	Thibault Peyre
30	DF	BEL	Jordi Vanlerberghe
31	GK	BEL	Senne Carleer
32	GK	RWA	Maxime Wenssens
33	MF	BRA	Vinícius Souza (on loan from Lommel)
34	DF	NED	Rick van Drongelen (on loan from Union Berlin)
35	FW	UKR	Marian Shved
37	MF	BEL	Bas Van den Eynden
—	MF	USA	Jorge Hernandez

=== Other players under contract ===
Note: Flags indicate national team as defined under FIFA eligibility rules; some limited exceptions apply. Players may hold more than one non-FIFA nationality.

No.	Pos.	Nation	Player
—	DF	SWE	Victor Wernersson

=== Out on loan ===
Note: Flags indicate national team as defined under FIFA eligibility rules; some limited exceptions apply. Players may hold more than one non-FIFA nationality.

No.	Pos.	Nation	Player
—	GK	BEL	Arno Valkenaers (to Thes Sport until 30 June 2022)
—	DF	BEL	Ilias Breugelmans (to Helmond Sport until 30 June 2022)
—	DF	BEL	Maxime De Bie (to Helmond Sport until 30 June 2022)
—	MF	BEL	Gaétan Bosiers (to Helmond Sport until 30 June 2022)

No.	Pos.	Nation	Player
—	MF	BEL	Senne Ceulemans (to Thes Sport until 30 June 2022)
—	MF	BEL	Jarno Lion (to Helmond Sport until 30 June 2022)
—	FW	BEL	Jules Houttequiet (to Helmond Sport until 30 June 2022)
—	FW	CIV	William Togui (to RWDM until 30 June 2022)

== Transfers ==
=== In ===
No.	Pos	Player	Transferred from	Fee	Date	Source
–	MF	(Cameroon) Samuel Gouet	(Austria) Rheindorf Altach	Undisclosed	1 July 2021	
–	FW	(Belgium) Hugo Cuypers	(Greece) Olympiacos	Undisclosed	1 July 2021	
–	MF	(Brazil) Vinicius Souza	(Belgium) Lommel	Loan	1 July 2021	
–	DF	(Belgium) Iebe Swers	(Belgium) Seraing	Undisclosed	1 July 2021	
–	DF	(Belgium) Flor Van Den Eynden	Free agent	Free	1 January 2022	
–	MF	(Belgium) Dries Wouters	(Germany) Schalke 04	Loan	12 January 2022	
–	DF	(Netherlands) Rick van Drongelen	(Germany) Union Berlin	Loan	31 January 2022	
–	FW	(France) Élie Youan	(Switzerland) St. Gallen	Loan	31 January 2022	

== Pre-season and friendlies ==
Win Draw Loss Fixtures

26 June 2021 Friendly	Tempo Overijse (Belgium)	1–7	(Belgium) Mechelen	Overijse, Belgium
13:15 CEST (UTC+2)		Report		Stadium: Begijnhofstadion

30 June 2021 Friendly	FC Utrecht (Netherlands)	7–2	(Belgium) Mechelen	Utrecht, Netherlands
17:00 CEST (UTC+2)	Sylla 2'; Ramselaar 19'; Dalmau 28', 44'; Balk 57'; Kerk 65'; Cuypers 71' (o.g.)	Report	Hairemans 32'; Cuypers 75'	Stadium: Sportcomplex Zoudenbalch; Attendance: 0

2 July 2021 Friendly	Mechelen (Belgium)	Cancelled	(Belgium) Sint-Truiden	Belgium
14:00 CEST (UTC+2)

9 July 2021 Friendly	Mechelen (Belgium)	2–2	(Netherlands) Roda JC	Geel, Belgium
13:00 CEST (UTC+2)	Dailly 8'; Cuypers (penalty missed) 69', 74'	Report	Jensen 30'; Goppel 61'	Stadium: De Leunen

10 July 2021 Friendly	Standard Liège (Belgium)	2–2	(Belgium) Mechelen	Belgium
17:00 CEST (UTC+2)	Drăguș 30'; Klauss 46'		Hairemans 7'; Walsh 29'

17 July 2021 Friendly	Mechelen (Netherlands)	2–1	(Greece) Volos	Geel, Belgium
14:30 CEST (UTC+2)	Schoofs 29'; Cuypers 68'		Fernandes 66'	Stadium: De Leunen

18 July 2021 Friendly	Westerlo (Belgium)	3–1	(Belgium) Mechelen	Belgium
11:00 CEST (UTC+2)	Vaesen 2', 35'; Van Eenoo 52'	Report	Van Hoorenbeeck 17'

7 January 2022 Friendly	Wehen Wiesbaden (Germany)	4–1	(Belgium) Mechelen	Oliva, Spain
14:30 CET (UTC+1)	Iredale 13', 30'; Langford 63', 113'		Druijf 5' (pen.)	Stadium: Oliva Nova Golf & Beach Resort

== Competitions ==
=== Overall record ===
Competition	First match	Last match	Starting round	Final position	Record							
Competition	First match	Last match	Starting round	Final position	Pld	W	D	L	GF	GA	GD	Win %
First Division A	25 July 2021	21 May 2022	Matchday 1	7th	40	16	8	16	67	78	−11	40.00
Belgian Cup	26 October 2021	22 December 2021	Sixth round	Quarter-finals	3	2	0	1	5	5	+0	66.67
Total					43	18	8	17	72	83	−11	41.86

Last updated: 21 May 2022
Source: Soccerway

=== First Division A ===
==== Regular season ====
Pos	Team	Pld	W	D	L	GF	GA	GD	Pts	Qualification or relegation
5	Gent	34	18	8	8	56	30	+26	62	Qualification for the Play-offs II
6	Charleroi	34	15	9	10	55	46	+9	54	Qualification for the Play-offs II
7	Mechelen	34	15	7	12	57	61	−4	52	Qualification for the Play-offs II
8	Genk	34	15	6	13	66	47	+19	51	Qualification for the Play-offs II
9	Sint-Truiden	34	15	6	13	42	40	+2	51	

Source: Jupiler Pro League (in Dutch), Soccerway
Rules for classification: 1) Points; 2) Matches won; 3) Goal difference; 4) Goals scored; 5) Away matches won; 6) Away goal difference; 7) Away goals scored; 8) Play-off.

==== Results summary ====
Overall								Home						Away					
Pld	W	D	L	GF	GA	GD	Pts	W	D	L	GF	GA	GD	W	D	L	GF	GA	GD
34	15	7	12	57	61	−4	52	10	4	3	36	24	+12	5	3	9	21	37	−16

Source: Jupiler Pro League

==== Results by round ====
Round	1	2	3	4	5	6	7	8	9	10	11	12	13	14	15	16	17	18	19	20	21	22	23	24	25	26	27	28	29	30	31	32	33	34
Ground	H	A	H	A	H	A	A	H	A	H	A	H	A	H	H	A	H	A	H	A	H	A	H	A	A	H	H	A	H	A	H	A	H	A
Result	W	L	L	L	W	D	L	W	W	W	W	D	W	L	W	L	D	L	W	L	W	L	L	L	W	W	W	W	D	D	D	D	W	L
Position	4	8	14	15	10	13	16	12	9	6	5	5	4	4	4	4	7	7	7	8	7	7	7	9	7	7	7	6	6	6	6	7	6	7

Source: Jupiler Pro League
A = Away; H = Home; W = Win; D = Draw; L = Loss

==== Matches ====
The league fixtures were announced on 8 June 2021.

25 July 2021 1	Mechelen	3–2	Antwerp	Mechelen
13:30 CEST (UTC+2)	De Laet 60' (o.g.); Walsh (yellow card) 66'; Druijf 73', 74'; Schoofs (yellow card) 76'	Report	Frey 18'; Benson 56'; Verstraete (yellow card) 79'; Bataille (yellow card) 90+3'	Stadium: Achter de Kazerne; Attendance: 4,800; Referee: Nicolas Laforge

31 July 2021 2	Seraing	1–0	Mechelen	Seraing
18:30 CEST (UTC+2)	Mouandilmadji 14'	Report		Stadium: Stade du Pairay; Attendance: 1,684; Referee: Wesli De Cremer

7 August 2021 3	Mechelen	1–3	Eupen	Mechelen
18:30 CEST (UTC+2)	Vinícius Souza 33'	Report	Peeters 49'; Agbadou 85'; Embaló 90'	Stadium: AFAS Stadion; Attendance: 4,800; Referee: Christof Dierick

15 August 2021 4	Gent	2–0	Mechelen	Ghent
16:00 CEST (UTC+2)	Ngadeu-Ngadjui 28'; Fortuna 90+2'	Report		Stadium: Ghelamco Arena; Attendance: 14,604; Referee: Nathan Verboomen

22 August 2021 5	Mechelen	3–1	Union Saint-Gilloise	Mechelen
21:00 CEST (UTC+2)	Costa (yellow card) 8'; Cuypers 13'; Schwed 55'; Shved (yellow card) 64'; Storm 77'	Report	Vanzeir 1', (yellow card) 69'; Sorinola (yellow card) 91'; Nieuwkoop (yellow card) 93'	Stadium: AFAS-stadion Achter de Kazerne; Attendance: 12,652; Referee: Bert Put

27 August 2021 6	Kortrijk	2–2	Mechelen	Kortrijk
20:45 CEST (UTC+2)	D'haene 58'; Guèye 76'	Report	Storm 14', 20'	Stadium: Guldensporen Stadion; Attendance: 3,493; Referee: Alexandre Boucaut

12 September 2021 7	Anderlecht	7–2	Mechelen	Anderlecht
13:30 CEST (UTC+2)	Raman 23'; Kouamé 49' 57'; Olsson (yellow card) 60'; Murillo 61'; Amuzu 74'; Verschaeren 85'; Zirkzee 87'	Report	Storm 36'; Kaya 90+1'	Stadium: Constant Vanden Stock Stadium; Attendance: 19,500; Referee: Jonathan Lardot

18 September 2021 8	Mechelen	2–0	OH Leuven	Mechelen
CEST (UTC+2)		Report		Stadium: AFAS Stadion

26 September 2021 9	Charleroi	0–2	Mechelen	Charleroi
21:00 CEST (UTC+2)		Report	Storm 20'; Vanlerberghe 8'	Stadium: Stade du Pays de Charleroi

1 October 2021 10	Mechelen	3–1	Standard Liège	Mechelen
20:45 CEST (UTC+2)	Cuypers 4'; Mrabti 10' (pen.); Walsh 18'		Drăguș 82'	Stadium: AFAS Stadion; Referee: Nathan Verboomen

17 October 2021 11	Beerschot	0–1	Mechelen	Antwerp
16:00 CET (UTC+1)			Mrabti 30'	Stadium: Olympisch Stadion; Referee: Lothar D'hondt

23 October 2021 12	Mechelen	2–2	Zulte Waregem	Mechelen
18:30 CEST (UTC+2)	Verstraete 16'; Dismas 41' (o.g.)		Sangare 54'; Vossen 62' (pen.)	Stadium: AFAS Stadion; Referee: Jasper Vergoote

29 October 2021 13	Oostende	2–4	Mechelen	Ostend
21:00 CET (UTC+1)				Stadium: Diaz Arena

6 November 2021 14	Mechelen	0–1	Sint-Truiden	Mechelen
CET (UTC+1)				Stadium: AFAS Stadion

19 November 2021 15	Mechelen	2–1	Club Brugge	Mechelen
20:45 CET (UTC+1)				Stadium: Achter de Kazerne; Referee: Nathan Verboomen

27 November 2021 16	Cercle Brugge	3–1	Mechelen	Bruges
18:30 CET (UTC+1)				Stadium: Jan Breydel Stadium

5 December 2021 17	Mechelen	1–1	Genk	Mechelen
21:00 CET (UTC+1)				Stadium: AFAS Stadion

12 December 2021 18	Union Saint-Gilloise	2–0	Mechelen	Brussels
16:00 CET (UTC+1)	François (yellow card) 16'; Vanzeir 35'; Nielsen (yellow card) 46'; Teuma 55'; Burgess (yellow card) 69'; Van der Heyden (yellow card) 70'	Report	Mrabti (yellow card) 13'; Van Hoorenbeeck (yellow card) 52'	Stadium: Stade Joseph Marien; Attendance: 8,100; Referee: Christof Dierick

15 December 2021 19	Mechelen	4–3	Gent	Mechelen
18:45 CET (UTC+1)	Mrabti 36', 60'; Storm 54', 70'	Report	Tissoudali 33', 68'; Depoitre 50'	Stadium: Achter de Kazerne; Attendance: 12,385; Referee: Erik Lambrechts

18 December 2021 20	Zulte Waregem	3–2	Mechelen	Waregem
18:30 CET (UTC+1)				Stadium: Elindus Arena; Referee: Kevin Van Damme

27 December 2021 21	Mechelen	2–0	Seraing	Mechelen
18:45 CET (UTC+1)				Stadium: Achter de Kazerne; Referee: Jasper Vergoote

15 January 2022 22	OH Leuven	5–0	Mechelen	Leuven
16:15 CET (UTC+1)				Stadium: Den Dreef
Note: The result was awarded as 5–0 forfeit win due to Mechelen opting to not send their team after multiple COVID-19 cases. Their initial request to postpone the match was declined.

23 January 2022 23	Mechelen	0–1	Anderlecht	Mechelen
18:30 CET (UTC+1)		Report	Zirkzee 23'	Stadium: Achter de Kazerne; Referee: Jan Boterberg

30 January 2022 25	Standard Liège	1–2	Mechelen	Liège
18:30 CET (UTC+1)	Cafaro 44'	Report	Mrabti 49'; Storm 90'	Stadium: Stade Maurice Dufrasne; Attendance: 10,286; Referee: Bram Van Driessche

6 February 2022 26	Mechelen	3–2	Beerschot	Mechelen
16:00 CET (UTC+1)		Report		Stadium: Achter de Kazerne; Referee: Alexandre Boucaut

12 February 2022 27	Mechelen	3–0	Oostende	Mechelen
18:30 CET (UTC+1)				Stadium: Achter de Kazerne; Referee: Nicola Laforge

16 February 2022 24	Genk	4–1	Mechelen	Genk
21:00 CET (UTC+1)				Stadium: Luminus Arena

20 February 2022 28	Antwerp	1–2	Mechelen	Antwerp
13:30 CET (UTC+1)	Haroun (yellow card) 67'; Frey 83'		Cuypers 24'; Storm 26'; Vinícius (yellow card) 67'; Vanlerberghe (yellow card) 85'	Stadium: Bosuilstadion; Attendance: 11,354; Referee: Lothar D'hondt

26 February 2022 29	Mechelen	2–2	Cercle Brugge	Mechelen
CET (UTC+1)				Stadium: Achter de Kazerne

4 March 2022 30	Sint-Truiden	1–1	Mechelen	Sint-Truiden
20:45 CET (UTC+1)				Stadium: Stayen

12 March 2022 31	Mechelen	2–2	Charleroi	Mechelen
CET (UTC+1)				Stadium: Achter de Kazerne

19 March 2022 32	Eupen	1–1	Mechelen	Eupen
16:15 CET (UTC+1)				Stadium: Kehrwegstadion

2 April 2022 33	Mechelen	3–2	Kortrijk	Mechelen
18:30 CEST (UTC+2)				Stadium: Achter de Kazerne

10 April 2022 34	Club Brugge	2–0	Mechelen	Bruges
18:30 CEST (UTC+2)	Rits 32'; Skov Olsen 76'	Report		Stadium: Jan Breydel Stadium; Attendance: 21,802; Referee: Bram Van Driessche

==== Play-Off II ====
Pos	Team	Pld	W	D	L	GF	GA	GD	Pts	Qualification or relegation	GNT	GNK	CHA	MEC
1	Gent	6	4	0	2	9	5	+4	43	Qualification for the Europa League play-off round (Note: Gent qualified for the Europa League play-off round as the 2021–22 Belgian Cup winners.)	—	0–1	1–2	1–0
2	Genk	6	3	2	1	10	8	+2	37		0–2	—	3–2	4–2
3	Charleroi	6	2	1	3	10	12	−2	34		1–3	2–2	—	3–2
4	Mechelen	6	1	1	4	6	10	−4	30		1–2	0–0	1–0	—

Source: Jupiler Pro League (in Dutch), Soccerway
Legend: Blue = home team win; Yellow = draw; Red = away team win.
Rules for classification: 1) Points; 2) Points without (possible) half points added due to rounding; 3) Regular season finishing position.

==== Results summary ====
Overall								Home						Away					
Pld	W	D	L	GF	GA	GD	Pts	W	D	L	GF	GA	GD	W	D	L	GF	GA	GD
6	1	1	4	6	10	−4	4	1	1	1	2	2	0	0	0	3	4	8	−4

Last updated: 21 May 2022.
Source: Jupiler Pro League

==== Results by round ====
Round	1	2	3	4	5	6
Ground	H	A	A	H	A	H
Result	W	L	L	L	L	D
Position						

Updated to match(es) played on 21 May 2022. Source: Jupiler Pro League
A = Away; H = Home; W = Win; D = Draw; L = Loss

==== Matches ====
23 April 2022 1	Mechelen	1–0	Charleroi	Mechelen
20:45 CEST (UTC+2)	Vanlerberghe 51'	Report		Stadium: Achter de Kazerne; Attendance: 9,068; Referee: Nicolas Laforge

29 April 2022 2	Genk	4–2	Mechelen	Genk
20:45 CEST (UTC+2)		Report		Stadium: Cegeka Arena; Attendance: 14,021; Referee: Lawrence Visser

7 May 2022 3	Gent	1–0	Mechelen	Ghent
20:45 CEST (UTC+2)	De Sart (yellow card) 70'; Okumu 82'	Report	Van Hoorenbeeck (yellow card) 62'; Van Hecke (yellow card) 88'; Hairemans (yellow card) 90'; Peyre (red card) 90+3'	Stadium: Ghelamco Arena; Attendance: 8,363; Referee: Alexandre Boucaut

10 May 2022 4	Mechelen	1–2	Gent	Mechelen
18:45 CEST (UTC+2)	Mrabti (penalty missed) 45+4'; Hairemans 89'	Report	Ngadeu-Ngadjui 36'; Bezus (yellow card) 85'; Godeau (yellow card) 87'; Owusu (yellow card) 90'; Tissoudali 90+4'	Stadium: Achter de Kazerne; Attendance: 8,213; Referee: Jan Boterberg

14 May 2022 5	Charleroi	3–2	Mechelen	Charleroi
20:45 CEST (UTC+2)		Report		Stadium: Stade du Pays de Charleroi; Attendance: 4,111; Referee: Wim Smet

21 May 2022 6	Mechelen	0–0	Genk	Mechelen
20:45 CEST (UTC+2)	Van Hecke (yellow card) 31'; Souza (yellow card) 54'	Report		Stadium: Achter de Kazerne; Attendance: 11,278; Referee: Christof Dierick

=== Belgian Cup ===
26 October 2021 Sixth round	Mechelen	2–1	Union Saint-Gilloise	Mechelen
20:30 CEST (UTC+2)	Shved 16'; Swers (yellow card) 24'; Hairemans 65'; Schoofs (yellow card) 82'	Report	Sorinola (yellow card) 40'; Vanzeir 82', (yellow card) 93'	Stadium: Achter de Kazerne; Referee: Arthur Denil

1 December 2021 Seventh round	Mechelen	2–1 (a.e.t.)	Cercle Brugge	Mechelen
20:30 CET (UTC+1)	De Camargo 67'; Storm 117'	Report	Somers 30'	Stadium: Achter de Kazerne; Referee: Bram Van Driessche

22 December 2021 Quarter-finals	Mechelen	1–3	Eupen	Mechelen
20:30 CET (UTC+1)	De Camargo 23'	Report	Ngoy 55'; Prevljak 83', 90+6'	Stadium: Achter de Kazerne; Referee: Lothar D'hondt

== Statistics ==
=== Goalscorers ===
As of 21 May 2022

Rank	Pos.	No.	Player	Pro League	Belgian Cup	Total
1	FW	11	(Belgium) Nikola Storm	15	1	16
2	FW	14	(Belgium) Hugo Cuypers	13	0	13
3	FW	19	(Sweden) Kerim Mrabti	10	0	10
4	MF	7	(Belgium) Geoffry Hairemans	5	1	6
5	MF	16	(Belgium) Rob Schoofs	4	0	4
6	DF	7	(Netherlands) Sandy Walsh	3	0	3
6	FW	35	(Ukraine) Marian Shved	2	1	3
8	DF	30	(Belgium) Jordi Vanlerberghe	2	0	2
8	FW	10	(Belgium) Igor de Camargo	2	0	2
8	FW	20	(Sweden) Gustav Engvall	2	0	2
Total				67	5	72
