= 2023–24 Royale Union Saint-Gilloise season =

Royale Union Saint-Gilloise
2023–24 season
- Chairman: Alex Muzio
- Manager: Alexander Blessin
- Stadium: Joseph Marien Stadium
- Belgian Pro League: 2nd
- Belgian Cup: Winners
- UEFA Europa League: Group stage
- UEFA Europa Conference League: Round of 16
- Top goalscorer: League: Mohamed Amoura (18); All: Mohamed Amoura (25)
Home colours	Away colours

The 2023–24 season was Royale Union Saint-Gilloise's 126th season in existence and third consecutive in the Belgian Pro League. They also competed in the Belgian Cup, UEFA Europa League and the Europa Conference League. They reached the final of and won the Belgian Cup for the first time since 1914.

== Players ==
=== First-team squad ===
As of 21 December 2023

Note: Flags indicate national team as defined under FIFA eligibility rules; some limited exceptions apply. Players may hold more than one non-FIFA nationality.

No.	Pos.	Nation	Player
4	MF	NOR	Mathias Rasmussen
5	DF	ARG	Kevin Mac Allister
7	MF	BEL	Elton Kabangu
8	MF	CIV	Jean Thierry Lazare
9	FW	GER	Dennis Eckert
10	MF	MAD	Loïc Lapoussin
11	FW	GER	Henok Teklab
12	GK	AUT	Heinz Lindner
13	FW	ECU	Kevin Rodríguez
14	GK	SWE	Joachim Imbrechts
16	DF	ENG	Christian Burgess
17	FW	FIN	Casper Terho
19	DF	BEL	Guillaume François

No.	Pos.	Nation	Player
21	MF	BEL	Alessio Castro-Montes
23	MF	ESP	Cameron Puertas
24	MF	BEL	Charles Vanhoutte
26	DF	ENG	Ross Sykes
27	DF	COD	Noah Sadiki
28	DF	JPN	Koki Machida
29	FW	SWE	Gustaf Nilsson
34	GK	RWA	Maxime Wenssens
35	MF	BEL	Nathan Huygevelde
47	FW	ALG	Mohamed Amoura
48	DF	BEL	Fedde Leysen
49	GK	LUX	Anthony Moris

== Transfers ==
=== In ===
Pos.	Player	Transferred from	Fee	Date	Source
MF	(Norway) Mathias Rasmussen	(Norway) Brann	€1,200,000	1 July 2023	
DF	(Belgium) Fedde Leysen	(Netherlands) Jong PSV	Free	1 July 2023	
FW	(Belgium) Elton Kabangu	(Netherlands) Willem II	Free	1 July 2023	
DF	(Japan) Koki Machida	(Japan) Kashima Antlers	€1,000,000	1 July 2023	
DF	(Argentina) Kevin Mac Allister	(Argentina) Argentinos Juniors	€1,500,000	12 July 2023	
DF	(Democratic Republic of the Congo) Noah Sadiki	(Belgium) Anderlecht	€1,400,000	27 July 2023	
FW	(Algeria) Mohamed El Amine Amoura	(Switzerland) Lugano	€4,000,000	18 August 2023	
GK	(Rwanda) Maxime Wenssens	Unattached	Undisclosed	27 August 2023	
FW	(Ecuador) Kevin Rodríguez	(Ecuador) Independiente del Valle	Undisclosed	1 September 2023	
MF	(Belgium) Alessio Castro-Montes	(Belgium) Gent	€2,000,000	1 September 2023	
GK	(Austria) Heinz Lindner	(Switzerland) Sion	Loan	16 January 2024	

=== Out ===
Pos.	Player	Transferred to	Fee	Date	Source
MF	(Morocco) Ilyes Ziani	(Belgium) SL16 FC	Undisclosed	1 July 2023	
MF	(Malta) Teddy Teuma	(France) Reims	€3,600,000	7 July 2023	
DF	(Morocco) Ismaël Kandouss	(Belgium) Gent	€3,000,000	12 July 2023	
DF	(Belgium) Siebe Van der Heyden	(Spain) Mallorca	€2,500,000	18 July 2023	
MF	(Morocco) Oussama El Azzouzi	(Italy) Bologna	€2,000,000	20 July 2023	
FW	(Nigeria) Victor Boniface	(Germany) Bayer Leverkusen	€20,000,000	22 July 2023	
MF	(Belgium) Senne Lynen	(Germany) Werder Bremen	€2,100,000	8 August 2023	
DF	(Netherlands) Bart Nieuwkoop	(Netherlands) Feyenoord	€2,000,000	10 August 2023	
GK	(Belgium) Lucas Pirard	(Belgium) KV Kortrijk	Undisclosed	25 August 2023	
MF	(Belgium) Viktor Boone	(Belgium) Lierse	Loan	5 September 2023	
DF	(Belgium) Arnaud Dony	(Belgium) Dender	Loan	7 September 2023	
DF	(England) Matthew Sorinola	(England) Plymouth Argyle	Released	28 December 2023	

Notes
1.Exercised buy option.

== Pre-season and friendlies ==
Win Draw Loss Fixtures

9 July 2023 Friendly	Monaco (France)	1–1	(Belgium) Union Saint-Gilloise	La Turbie
11:00 UTC+2	Martins 73'		Boniface 42'	Stadium: CMB Training Centre

11 July 2023 Friendly	Nice (France)	v	(Belgium) Union Saint-Gilloise	Nice
10:30 UTC+2
Note: The match was cancelled.

12 July 2023 Friendly	Union Saint-Gilloise (Belgium)	4–0	(Belgium) RFC Liège	Overijse
18:30 UTC+2	Puertas 50'; Boniface 60'; Eckert 118'; Sykes 120'			Stadium: Tempo Overijse facilities
Note: Match was played in two 60-minute periods.

15 July 2023 Friendly	Feyenoord (Netherlands)	0–0	(Belgium) Union Saint-Gilloise	Barendrecht
14:00 UTC+2				Stadium: Sportpark Smitshoek

21 July 2023 Friendly	Oostende (Belgium)	0–1	(Belgium) Union Saint-Gilloise	Oudenburg
18:15 UTC+2			Eckert 32'

22 July 2023 Friendly	Union Saint-Gilloise (Belgium)	1–0	(France) Valenciennes	Nijlen
13:00 UTC+2	Kabangu 8'			Stadium: KFC Nijlen A-terrein

30 July 2023 Friendly	Union Saint-Gilloise (Belgium)	0–1	(Belgium) Royale Jeunesse Aischoise	Brussels
16:00 UTC+2				Stadium: Le Barca Terrein 2

16 November 2023 Friendly	Union Saint-Gilloise (Belgium)	3–0	(Belgium) Lierse
13:00 UTC+1	Kabangu 25'; Eckert Aysena 61', 73'

12 January 2024 Friendly	Union Saint-Gilloise (Belgium)	4–0	(Switzerland) St. Gallen	San Pedro del Pinatar, Spain
13:00 UTC+1	Eckert 18'; Terho 65'; Rodríguez 79'; Kabangu 86' (pen.)			Stadium: Pinatar Arena

== Competitions ==
=== Overall record ===
Competition	First match	Last match	Starting round	Final position	Record							
Competition	First match	Last match	Starting round	Final position	Pld	W	D	L	GF	GA	GD	Win %
Belgian Pro League	28 July 2023	17 March 2024	Matchday 1	1st	30	21	7	2	63	31	+32	70.00
Belgian Pro League Champions' Playoffs	1 April 2024	26 May 2024	1st	2nd	10	4	2	4	17	12	+5	40.00
Belgian Cup	1 November 2023	9 May 2024	Seventh Round	Winners	6	5	0	1	10	4	+6	83.33
UEFA Europa League	24 August 2023	14 December 2023	Play-off round	Group stage	8	4	2	2	8	8	+0	50.00
UEFA Europa Conference League	15 February 2024	14 March 2024	Knockout round play-offs	Round of 16	4	2	1	1	5	6	−1	50.00
Total					58	36	12	10	103	61	+42	62.07

Last updated: 19 May 2024
Source: Soccerway

=== Belgian Pro League ===
==== League table ====
Pos	Team	Pld	W	D	L	GF	GA	GD	Pts	Qualification or relegation
1	Union SG	30	21	7	2	63	31	+32	70	Qualification for the Europa League and champions' play-offs (Note: The regular season winner qualified for the 2024–25 UEFA Europa League if not earning 2024–25 UEFA Champions League in the play-off.)
2	Anderlecht	30	18	9	3	58	30	+28	63	Qualification for the champions' play-offs
3	Antwerp	30	14	10	6	55	27	+28	52	Qualification for the champions' play-offs
4	Club Brugge	30	14	9	7	62	29	+33	51	Qualification for the champions' play-offs
5	Cercle Brugge	30	14	5	11	44	34	+10	47	Qualification for the champions' play-offs

Source: Jupiler Pro League (in Dutch), Soccerway
Rules for classification: 1) Points; 2) Matches won; 3) Goal difference; 4) Goals scored; 5) Away matches won; 6) Away goal difference; 7) Away goals scored; 8) Play-off.

==== Results summary ====
Overall								Home						Away					
Pld	W	D	L	GF	GA	GD	Pts	W	D	L	GF	GA	GD	W	D	L	GF	GA	GD
30	21	7	2	63	31	+32	70	11	3	1	34	16	+18	10	4	1	29	15	+14

Last updated: complete.

==== Results by round ====
Round	1	2	3	4	5	6	7	8	9	10	11	12	13	14	15	16	17	18	19	20	21	22	23	24	25	26	27	28	29	30
Ground	H	A	H	A	A	H	H	A	H	A	H	A	H	H	A	H	A	H	A	A	H	A	H	A	H	A	H	A	H	A
Result	W	W	W	L	W	D	L	W	W	W	W	W	W	W	D	W	W	W	W	D	W	D	W	W	D	W	W	W	D	D
Position	2	1	1	3	5	6	9	4	1	1	1	1	1	1	1	1	1	1	1	1	1	1	1	1	1	1	1	1	1	1

A = Away; H = Home; W = Win; D = Draw; L = Loss

==== Matches ====
The league fixtures were unveiled on 22 June 2023.

28 July 2023 1	Union Saint-Gilloise	2–0	Anderlecht	Brussels
20:45 UTC+2	Burgess (yellow card) 17'; Rasmussen (yellow card) 27'; Eckert 30'; Vanhoutte (yellow card) 54'; Nilsson (yellow card) 83'; Mac Allister (yellow card) 85'; Puertas 90+8' (pen.)	Report	Sardella (yellow card) 75'; Vertonghen (yellow card) 83'; Leoni (yellow card) 87'	Stadium: Joseph Marien Stadium; Attendance: 7,000; Referee: Bram Van Driessche

4 August 2023 2	Standard Liège	0–1	Union Saint-Gilloise	Liège
20:45 UTC+2	Balikwisha (yellow card) 5' (yellow-red card) 36'; Dønnum (yellow card) 62'	Report	Eckert 21'; Lynen (yellow card) 57'	Stadium: Stade Maurice Dufrasne; Attendance: 19,923; Referee: Jonathan Lardot

12 August 2023 3	Union Saint-Gilloise	5–1	OH Leuven	Brussels
18:15 UTC+2	Terho 21'; Puertas 34'; Burgess (yellow card) 60'; Eckert 65' (pen.), 74' (pen.); Nilsson 90+7' (pen.)	Report	Þorsteinsson 38'; Banzuzi (yellow card) 44'; Dom (yellow card) 53'; Kiyine (yellow card) 61'; Mendyl (yellow card) 90+7'	Stadium: Joseph Marien Stadium; Attendance: 5,731; Referee: Erik Lambrechts

19 August 2023 4	Mechelen	4–0	Union Saint-Gilloise	Mechelen
20:45 UTC+2	Mrabti 38'; Hairemans 78'; Belghali 89'; Bates 90+4'	Report	Amani (yellow card) 83'; Puertas (yellow card) 90+4'	Stadium: AFAS Stadion; Attendance: 11,651; Referee: Wim Smet

3 September 2023 6	Union Saint-Gilloise	2–2	Antwerp	Brussels
16:00 UTC+2	Eckert 4' (pen.); Nilsson 87' (pen.); Amoura (yellow card) 90+4'	Report	Coulibaly (yellow card) 7'; Vines 23'; Ekkelenkamp 44'; Vermeeren (yellow card) 81'	Stadium: Joseph Marien Stadium; Attendance: 6,890; Referee: Jan Boterberg

16 September 2023 7	Union Saint-Gilloise	0–2	Genk	Brussels
18:15 UTC+2	Vanhoutte (yellow card) 34'	Report	Zeqiri 16'; Oyen (yellow card) 29'; El Khannouss (yellow card) 43'; Muñoz (yellow card) 45+1'; Galarza (yellow card) 45+3', (goal) 90+2'; Paintsil (yellow card) 51'; Kayembe (yellow card) 56'	Stadium: Joseph Marien Stadium; Attendance: 6,983; Referee: Lawrence Visser

24 September 2023 8	Cercle Brugge	0–2	Union Saint-Gilloise	Brugge
16:00 UTC+2	Van der Bruggen (yellow card) 14'; Miangue (yellow card) 57' (yellow-red card) 83'		Amoura 16', 52'; Vanhoutte (yellow card) 29'; Leysen (yellow card) 65'	Stadium: Jan Breydel Stadium; Attendance: 4,729; Referee: Bram Van Driessche

28 September 2023 5	RWD Molenbeek	2–3	Union Saint-Gilloise	Molenbeek-Saint-Jean
18:30	Gueye 43'; Dwomoh 45+1'; Abe (yellow card) 47'; Sissako (yellow card) 83'		Nilsson 13', (yellow card) 49'; Amoura 33'; Mac Allister (yellow card) 56'; Rasmussen (yellow card) 89'; Lapoussin 90+6'	Stadium: Edmond Machtens Stadium; Attendance: 7,000
Note: Postponed from 27 August 2023.

1 October 2023 9	Union Saint-Gilloise	3–1	Charleroi	Brussels
13:30 UTC+2	Sykes 17', 45+4'; Burgess 45', (yellow card) 64'	Report	Guiagon 28'; Marcq (yellow card) 55'; Ilaimaharitra (yellow card) 86'	Stadium: Joseph Marien Stadium; Attendance: 5,850; Referee: Jasper Vergoote

8 October 2023 10	STVV	0–4	Union Saint-Gilloise	Sint-Truiden
19:15 UTC+2	Koita (yellow card) 90+1'	Report	Castro-Montes 37', (yellow card) 74'; Nilsson 45+2' (pen.), 58', (yellow card) 61'; Mac Allister (yellow card) 55'; Machida (yellow card) 70'; Amoura 86'	Stadium: Stayen; Attendance: 7,500; Referee: Kevin Van Damme

20 October 2023 11	Union Saint-Gilloise	4–1	Eupen	Brussels
20:45 CEST	Nilsson 27'; Rasmussen 31'; Amoura 68'; Kabangu 82'		Möhwald (yellow card) 61'; Pálsson 81'; Bitumazala (yellow card) 85' (yellow-red card) 90'	Stadium: Joseph Marien Stadium; Attendance: 5,125; Referee: Lothar D'Hondt

29 October 2023 12	Westerlo	1–3	Union Saint-Gilloise	Westerlo
16:00 UTC+1	Daci 11'; Rommens (yellow card) 61'		Lapoussin 33'; Eckert 56'; Burgess (yellow card) 59'; Amoura 88'	Stadium: Het Kuipje; Attendance: 7,000; Referee: Wim Smet

5 November 2023 13	Union Saint-Gilloise	2–1	Club Brugge	Brussels
18:30 CET	Amoura 22' (yellow card) 35' (goal) 68'; Lapoussin (yellow card) 90+1'; Burgess (yellow card) 90+4'	Report	Odoi (yellow card) 20'; Vetlesen (yellow card) 56'; De Cuper 60'; Mingolet (yellow card) 90+4'; Spileers (yellow card) 90+5'	Stadium: Joseph Marien Stadium; Attendance: 7,265; Referee: Jasper Vergoote

12 November 2023 14	Union Saint-Gilloise	3–0	Kortrijk	Brussels
19:15 CET	Leysen (yellow card) 14'; Lapoussin (yellow card) 23', (goal) 54' (Puertas); Rodríguez 45', 45+4' (Puertas)	Report	Kadri (yellow card) 6'	Stadium: Joseph Marien Stadium; Attendance: 5,420; Referee: Brent Staessens

26 November 2023 15	Gent	1–1	Union Saint-Gilloise	Ghent
13:30 CET	Kums (yellow card) 43'; Fofana (yellow card) 43'; De Sart 45+3' (pen.)		Amoura (yellow card) 4'; Puertas 55'; Nilsson (yellow card) 66'; Lapoussin (yellow card) 88'	Stadium: Ghelamco Arena; Attendance: 18,007

3 December 2023 16	Union Saint-Gilloise	2–1	Cercle Brugge	Brussels
19:15 CET	Amoura 27'; Nilsson 31'; Vanhoutte (yellow card) 90+3'	Report	Denkey 33', (yellow card) 48'; Somers (yellow card) 49'; De Wilde (yellow card) 79'	Stadium: Joseph Marien Stadium; Attendance: 5,794; Referee: Bram Van Driessche

10 December 2023 17	Charleroi	1–3	Union Saint-Gilloise	Charleroi
19:15 CET	Bager (yellow card) 32'; Badji (yellow card) 59'; Andreou (yellow card) 62'; Guiagon 90+2'	Report	Amoura 15', 65'; Machida (yellow card) 38'; Amani (yellow card) 40'; Terho 50'	Stadium: Stade du Pays de Charleroi; Attendance: 6,693; Referee: Erik Lambrechts

17 December 2023 18	Union Saint-Gilloise	1–0	Mechelen	Brussels
16:00 CET	Amoura 54'; Nilsson (yellow card) 74'; Lapoussin (yellow card) 90+1'	Report	Bafdili (yellow card) 90+3'	Stadium: Joseph Marien Stadium; Attendance: 6,321; Referee: Bert Put

23 December 2023 19	Eupen	1–2	Union Saint-Gilloise	Eupen
16:00 CET	Davidson (yellow card) 11', (goal) 66'; Král (yellow card) 45'; Nuhu (yellow card) 54'; Paeshuyse (yellow card) 57'; Keita (yellow card) 90+3'	Report	Amoura 21'; Puertas 23'; Amani (yellow card) 82'	Stadium: Kehrwegstadion; Attendance: 2,956; Referee: Nicolas Laforge

26 December 2023 20	Club Brugge	1–1	Union Saint-Gilloise	Brugge
20:45 CET	Thiago 56' (pen.); Odoi (yellow card) 75'; Spileers (yellow card) 84'		Burgess (yellow card) 21'; Nilsson 27'; Vanhoutte (yellow card) 66'; Amani (yellow card) 70'; Mac Allister (yellow card) 77'; Puertas (yellow card) 89'; Moris (red card) 90+5'	Stadium: Jan Breydel Stadium

21 January 2024 21	Union Saint-Gilloise	2–1	STVV	Brussels
16:00 CET	Sykes 45+2'; Nilsson (yellow card) 77'; Rodríguez 90+7', (yellow card) 90+7'	Report	Zahiroleslam 17'; Hashioka (yellow card) 37'; Fujita (yellow card) 60'; Ananou (yellow card) 83'; Bocat (yellow card) 90+4'; Kaya (yellow card) 90+11'	Stadium: Joseph Marien Stadium; Attendance: 5,629

28 January 2024 22	Anderlecht	2–2	Union Saint-Gilloise	Brussels
18:30 CET	Vertonghen 35'; Stroeykens (yellow card) 58'; Arnstad (yellow card) 66'; Hazard 90+2'; Angulo (yellow card) 90+4'	Report	Nilsson 8'; Amoura 29'; Vanhoutte (yellow card) 45'; Mac Allister (yellow card) 70'	Stadium: Lotto Park; Attendance: 18,600

31 January 2024 23	Union Saint-Gilloise	3–2	RWDM	Brussels
21:00 CET	Nilsson 23'; Puertas 32' (pen.); Amoura 52' (pen.); Lapoussin (yellow card) 79'; François (yellow card) 90+2'	Report	Alberto 64'; Dwomoh (yellow card) 77'; Sampaio (yellow card) 83'; Biron 90+4'	Stadium: Joseph Marien Stadium; Attendance: 6,375

3 February 2024 24	Genk	0–1	Union Saint-Gilloise	Genk
20:45 CET	Hrošovský (yellow card) 53'	Report	Moris (yellow card) 16'; Burgess (yellow card) 25'; Amoura 67'; Nilsson (yellow card) 71'; Vanhoutte (yellow card) 90+2'	Stadium: Cegeka Arena

10 February 2024 25	Union Saint-Gilloise	2–2	Westerlo	Brussels
18:15 CET	Lapoussin 15', 59'; Terho (yellow card) 25'; Vanhoutte (yellow card) 62'; Amoura (yellow card) 72'; Mac Allister (yellow card) 75'	Report	Keybus 6'; Bayram (yellow card) 49'; Yow (yellow card) 52'; Madsen 90+6' (pen.)	Stadium: Joseph Marien Stadium

18 February 2024 26	Kortrijk	1–3	Union Saint-Gilloise	Kortrijk
16:00 CET	Tsunoda (yellow card) 4'; Ojo (yellow card) 26'; Bruno (yellow card) 50'; Davies 54'; Kadri (yellow card) 76'	Report	Rasmussen 8', (yellow card) 84'; Castro-Montes 17'; Amoura 52'	Stadium: Guldensporen Stadion

25 February 2024 27	Union Saint-Gilloise	2–1	Standard Liège	Brussels
18:30 CET	Vanhoutte (yellow card) 14'; Nilsson 35' (pen.); Eckert 38'	Report	Vanheusden (yellow card) 34'; Djenepo 50'; O'Neill (yellow card) 90+3'; Balikwisha (yellow card) 90+5'	Stadium: Joseph Marien Stadium

2 March 2024 28	OH Leuven	0–2	Union Saint-Gilloise	Leuven
18:15 CET	Thorsteinsson (yellow card) 6'; Maertens (yellow card) 24'; Misao (yellow card) 79'	Report	Burgess (yellow card) 24'; Sykes 28', (yellow card) 40'; Teklab (yellow card) 52'; Terho 74'	Stadium: Den Dreef

10 March 2024 29	Union Saint-Gilloise	1–1	Gent	Brussels
18:30 CET	Amoura (yellow card) 3'; Lapoussin (yellow card) 21'; Castro-Montes 65'; Eckert (yellow card) 90+3'	Report	Torunarigha (yellow card) 49'; Gerkens 53'	Stadium: Joseph Marien Stadium

17 March 2024 30	Antwerp	1–1	Union Saint-Gilloise	Antwerp
18:30 CET	Bataille (yellow card) 52'; Van Den Bosch (yellow card) 67'; Ejuke (yellow card) 82'; Kerk 90+2'	Report	Machida (yellow card) 48' (yellow-red card) 73'; Puertas (yellow card) 60'; Burgess (yellow card) 77'; Nilsson 84', (yellow card) 90+8'	Stadium: Bosuilstadion

==== Champions' Play-offs ====
Union Saint-Gilloise finished first in the regular season and will start the Champions' play-offs on 35 points, their nearest rivals Anderlecht start three points behind them.

Pos	Team	Pld	W	D	L	GF	GA	GD	Pts	Qualification or relegation	CLU	USG	AND	CER	GNK	ANT
1	Club Brugge (C)	10	7	3	0	21	6	+15	50	Qualification for the Champions League league stage	—	2–2	3–1	0–0	4–0	3–0
2	Union SG	10	4	2	4	17	12	+5	49	Qualification for the Champions League third qualifying round	1–2	—	0–0	2–3	2–0	4–1
3	Anderlecht	10	4	2	4	12	12	0	46	Qualification for the Europa League play-off round	0–1	2–1	—	3–0	2–1	1–0
4	Cercle Brugge	10	3	4	3	13	13	0	37	Qualification for the Europa League second qualifying round (Note: Union SG qualified for the Europa League play-off round by winning the 2023–24 Belgian Cup. The Europa League second qualifying spot and the European competition play-off spot were thus passed to the next two highest-placed teams that did not qualify for European competitions.)	1–1	1–2	1–1	—	4–1	0–1
5	Genk	10	4	1	5	8	17	−9	37	Qualification for the European competition play-off	0–3	1–0	2–1	1–1	—	1–0
6	Antwerp	10	2	0	8	7	18	−11	32		1–2	0–3	3–1	1–2	0–1	—

Source: Jupiler Pro League (in Dutch), Soccerway
Legend: Blue = home team win; Yellow = draw; Red = away team win.
Rules for classification: 1) Points; 2) Points without (possible) half points added due to rounding; 3) Regular season finishing position.
(C) Champions

==== Results by round ====
Round	1	2	3	4	5	6	7	8	9	10
Ground	A	H	A	H	A	H	A	H	A	H
Result	L	L	L	L	W	W	D	D	W	W
Position	1	1	2	3	3	3	3	3	2	2

A = Away; H = Home; W = Win; D = Draw; L = Loss

==== Matches ====
1 April 2024 1	Genk	1–0	Union Saint-Gilloise	Genk
18:30 CEST	Arokodare 27'; El Khannou (yellow card) 83'	Report	Sykes (yellow card) 83'; Burgess (red card) 90+5'	Stadium: Cegeka Arena

7 April 2024 2	Union Saint-Gilloise	2–3	Cercle Brugge	Brussels
13:30 CEST	Nilsson 45+4'; Moris (yellow card) 78'; Eckert 90+1'; Teklab (yellow card) 90+2'	Report	Minda 4' (yellow card) 78'; Denkey 5'; Lopes (yellow card) 46'; Utkus (yellow card) 68'; Somers 70'; Olaigbe (yellow card) 90'; Daland (yellow card) 90+5'	Stadium: Joseph Marien Stadium

14 April 2024 3	Anderlecht	2–1	Union Saint-Gilloise	Brussels
18:30 CEST	Dolberg 11'; Debast (yellow card) 29' (yellow-red card) 64'; Leoni (yellow card) 57'; Amuzu 76'		Puertas (yellow card) 25', (goal) 66' (pen.); Terho (yellow card) 85'; Machida (yellow card) 90+6'	Stadium: Constant Vanden Stock Stadium

21 April 2024 4	Union Saint-Gilloise	1–2	Club Brugge	Brussels
18:30 CEST	Amoura (yellow card) 60'; Puertas 82'; Lapoussin (yellow card) 90+2'; Castro-Montes (yellow card) 90+4'		Vetlesen (yellow card) 52' (yellow-red card) 65', (goal) 52'; Meijer 74'; Odoi (yellow card) 90+5'	Stadium: Joseph Marien Stadium

25 April 2024 5	Antwerp	0–3	Union Saint-Gilloise	Antwerp
20:30 CEST	Alderweireld (yellow card) 47'; Bataille (yellow card) 58'; Keita (yellow card) 69'		Amoura (yellow card) 16', (goal) 56'; Mac Allister (yellow card) 19'; Rasmussen (yellow card) 36'; Puertas 48', 87'; Castro-Montes (yellow card) 84'	Stadium: Bosuilstadion

28 April 2024 6	Union Saint-Gilloise	4–1	Antwerp	Brussels
18:30 CEST	Sadiki (yellow card) 33'; Nillson 37'; Mac Allister 39'; Puertas 54', 90+3'; Teklab (yellow card) 74'	Report	Janssen 17'; Yusuf (yellow card) 21'; Wijndal (yellow card) 31'; Kerk (yellow card) 34'; De Laet (yellow card) 52'	Stadium: Joseph Marien Stadium

5 May 2024 7	Union Saint-Gilloise	0–0	Anderlecht	Brussels
18:30 CEST	Vanhoutte (yellow card) 10'; Mac Allister (yellow card) 56'; Amani (yellow card) 75'	Report	Sardella (yellow card) 33'	Stadium: Joseph Marien Stadium

13 May 2024 8	Club Brugge	2–2	Union Saint-Gilloise	Bruges
20:30 CEST (UTC+2)	Onyedika (yellow card) 33'; Skov Olsen 57', 72'	Report	Teklab 48'; Castro-Montes (yellow card) 71'; Machida 84'; Burgess (yellow card) 90+5'	Stadium: Jan Breydel Stadium; Referee: Jonathan Lardot

19 May 2024 9	Cercle Brugge	1–2	Union Saint-Gilloise	Brugge
13:30 CEST	Felipe Augusto 32'	Report	Nilsson 28'; Castro-Montes 50'	Stadium: Jan Breydel Stadium; Referee: Wesli De Cremer

26 May 2024 10	Union Saint-Gilloise	2–0	Genk	Brussels
18:30 CEST	Vanhoutte 37', (yellow card) 66'; Teklab (yellow card) 42'; Nilsson 80' (pen.); Burgess (yellow card) 88'		Zeqiri (yellow card) 63'; El Ouahdi (red card) 78'	Stadium: Joseph Marien Stadium

=== Belgian Cup ===
1 November 2023 Seventh round	Union Saint-Gilloise	2–1	Meux	Brussels
15:00 CET (UTC+1)	Leysen 36'; Rasmussen 84'		Smal 83'	Stadium: Joseph Marien Stadium; Attendance: 5,800

7 December 2023 Eighth round	Beveren	0–2	Union Saint-Gilloise	Beveren
20:00 CET (UTC+1)	Goncalves (yellow card) 90+4'	Report	Sykes (yellow card) 60'; Bateau 90+3' (o.g.); Koyalipou 90+5' (o.g.)	Stadium: Freethiel Stadion; Attendance: 4,850

25 January 2024 Quarter-finals	Union Saint-Gilloise	2–1	Anderlecht	Brussels
20:30 CET (UTC+1)	Lapoussin 26', (yellow card) 90+9'; Mac Allister (red card) 32'; Burgess (yellow card) 53'; Rodríguez 62' (pen.); Moris (yellow card) 90+10'	Report	Leoni (yellow card) 24'; Rits (yellow card) 53'; Dreyer 90+4'	Stadium: Joseph Marien Stadium
Note: Postponed from 18 January 2024 due to adverse weather conditions

7 February 2024 Semi-finals; First leg	Club Brugge	2–1	Union Saint-Gilloise	Brugge
20:45 CET (UTC+1)	Olsen 10', (yellow card) 67'; Mechele (yellow card) 30'; Spileers (yellow card) 36'; Blanch 46'; Odoi (yellow card) 78'		Lapoussin (yellow card) 31'; Amoura (yellow card) 67'; Machida 90+2'; Burgess (yellow card) 90+3'	Stadium: Jan Breydel Stadium; Referee: Bram Van Driessche

28 February 2024 Semi-finals; Second leg	Union Saint-Gilloise	2–0 (3–2 agg.)	Club Brugge	Brussels
20:30 CET (UTC+1)	Rasmussen (yellow card) 50'; Amoura 73'; Vanhoutte (yellow card) 86'; Sykes 90+2'		Vanaken (yellow card) 43'; De Cuyper (red card) 90+9'	Stadium: Joseph Marien Stadium; Referee: Lothar D'hondt

9 May 2024 Final	Union Saint-Gilloise	1–0	Antwerp	Brussels
15:30 CEST (UTC+2)	Amoura (yellow card) 34'; Machida 45+1'; Burgess (yellow card) 68'; Castro-Montes (yellow card) 90'; Moris (yellow card) 90+1'	Report	Matazo (yellow card) 30'; Janssen (yellow card) 54'; Van den Bosch (yellow card) 88'	Stadium: King Baudouin Stadium; Referee: Eric Lambrechts

=== UEFA Europa League ===
==== Play-off round ====
The draw for the play-off round was held on 7 August 2023.

24 August 2023 First leg	Union Saint-Gilloise (Belgium)	2–0	(Switzerland) Lugano	Brussels
20:30 UTC+2	Eckert 8', (yellow card) 42'; Mac Allister (yellow card) 67'; Terho 71'; Nilsson (yellow card) 90+6'	Report	Sabbatini (yellow card) 76'	Stadium: Constant Vanden Stock Stadium; Attendance: 7,238; Referee: Enea Jorgji (Albania)

31 August 2023 Second leg	Lugano (Switzerland)	0–1 (0–3 agg.)	(Belgium) Union Saint-Gilloise	Geneva, Switzerland
20:30 UTC+2	Hajdari (yellow card) 40' (red card) 90+3'; Bislimi (yellow card) 45'	Report	Eckert 6'; Lapoussin (yellow card) 38'	Stadium: Stade de Genève; Attendance: 1,171; Referee: Harm Osmers (Germany)

==== Group stage ====
The draw for the group stage was held on 1 September 2023.

Pos	Team	Pld	W	D	L	GF	GA	GD	Pts	Qualification	LIV	TOU	USG	LAS
1	(England) Liverpool	6	4	0	2	17	7	+10	12	Advance to round of 16	—	5–1	2–0	4–0
2	(France) Toulouse	6	3	2	1	8	9	−1	11	Advance to knockout round play-offs	3–2	—	0–0	1–0
3	(Belgium) Union Saint-Gilloise	6	2	2	2	5	8	−3	8	Transfer to Europa Conference League	2–1	1–1	—	2–1
4	(Austria) LASK	6	1	0	5	6	12	−6	3		1–3	1–2	3–0	—

Source: UEFA
Rules for classification: Group stage tiebreakers

21 September 2023 1	Union Saint-Gilloise (Belgium)	1–1	(France) Toulouse	Brussels
18:55 UTC+2	Vanhoutte (yellow card) 14'; Mac Allister (yellow card) 53'; Amoura 69'; Sadiki (yellow card) 78'	Report	Dønnum (yellow card) 33'; Dallinga 45+3'; Costa (yellow card) 66' (yellow-red card) 90+4'; Magri (yellow card) 86'	Stadium: Constant Vanden Stock Stadium; Attendance: 12,161; Referee: Rohit Saggi (Norway)
Note: Kick-off was delayed due to the late arrival of both teams.

5 October 2023 2	Liverpool (England)	2–0	(Belgium) Union Saint-Gilloise	Liverpool, England
20:00 UTC+1	Gravenberch 44'; Jota 90+2'	Report		Stadium: Anfield; Attendance: 49,513; Referee: Morten Krogh (Denmark)

26 October 2023 3	Union Saint-Gilloise (Belgium)	2–1	(Austria) LASK	Brussels
21:00 UTC+2	Vanhoutte (yellow card) 80'; Puertas 84'; Burgess (yellow card) 88' (goal) 90+4'	Report	Usor 24'; Bello (yellow card) 26'; Žulj (yellow card) 28'; Horvath (yellow card) 90+1'; Talovierov (yellow card) 90+3'	Stadium: Constant Vanden Stock Stadium; Attendance: 11,426; Referee: Atilla Karaoglan (Türkiye)

9 November 2023 4	LASK (Austria)	3–0	(Belgium) Union Saint-Gilloise	Linz, Austria
18:45 UTC+1	Ljubic (yellow card) 19'; Horvath 25' (pen.); Talovierov 45+4'; Stojković (yellow card) 49'; Žulj 77'	Report	Puertas (yellow card) 71'	Stadium: Raiffeisen Arena; Attendance: 15,900; Referee: Simone Sozza (Italy)

30 November 2023 5	Toulouse (France)	0–0	(Belgium) Union Saint-Gilloise	Toulouse, France
21:00 UTC+1	Sierro (yellow card) 57'		Vanhoutte (yellow card) 14'; Mac Allister (yellow card) 34'; Amoura (yellow card) 56'; Sadiki (yellow card) 90+2'	Stadium: Stadium de Toulouse; Attendance: 31,205; Referee: Matej Jug (Slovenia)

14 December 2023 6	Union Saint-Gilloise (Belgium)	2–1	(England) Liverpool	Brussels
18:45 UTC+1	Amoura 32'; Puertas 43'; Sadiki (yellow card) 53'	Report	Bradley (yellow card) 23'; Quansah 39'; Scanlon (yellow card) 90+2'	Stadium: Constant Vanden Stock Stadium; Attendance: 16,959

=== UEFA Europa Conference League ===
==== Knockout round play-off ====
The draw for the knockout round play-offs was held 18 December 2023.

15 February 2024 First leg	Union Saint-Gilloise (Belgium)	2–2	(Germany) Eintracht Frankfurt	Brussels
18:45 UTC+1	Burgess (yellow card) 26'; Rasmussen 31'; Vanhoutte (yellow card) 35' (yellow-red card) 78'; Nilsson 68'; Lindner (yellow card) 90+5'	Report	Chaïbi 3', (yellow card) 85'; Tuta (yellow card) 4'; Kalajdžić 10'; Buta (yellow card) 82'	Stadium: Constant Vanden Stock Stadium; Attendance: 9,015; Referee: Craig Pawson (England)

22 February 2024 Second leg	Eintracht Frankfurt (Germany)	1–2 (3–4 agg.)	(Belgium) Union Saint-Gilloise	Frankfurt, Germany
21:00 UTC+1	Buta (yellow card) 20'; Trapp (yellow card) 76'; Chandler (yellow card) 82'; Dina Ebimbe 88', (yellow card) 89'	Report	Puertas 47'; Amoura (yellow card) 76'; Eckert 80'; Machida (yellow card) 87'	Stadium: Waldstadion; Referee: Espen Eskås, (Norway)

==== Round of 16 ====
The draw for the round of 16 was held on 23 February 2024, Union Saint-Gilloise were unseeded in the draw and was prevented from drawing Club Brugge as clubs from the same association can not play in this round.

7 March 2024 First leg	Union Saint-Gilloise (Belgium)	0–3	(Turkey) Fenerbahçe	Brussels
20:00	Amoura (yellow card) 45'; Machida (yellow card) 54'; Burgess (yellow card) 90+3'	Report	Batshuayi 20'; Krunić (yellow card) 81'; Oosterwolde 84'; Tadić 90+4' (pen.)	Stadium: Constant Vanden Stock Stadium

14 March 2024 Second leg	Fenerbahçe (Turkey)	0–1 (3–1 agg.)	(Belgium) Union Saint-Gilloise	Istanbul, Turkey
18:45	Yüksek (yellow card) 38'; Eğribayat (yellow card) 87'	Report	Rasmussen 68'; Ayensa (yellow card) 87'	Stadium: Şükrü Saracoğlu Stadium

== Statistics ==
=== Squad appearances and goals ===
No.	Pos	Nat	Player	Total		Belgian Division		Belgian Cup		UEFA Europa League		UEFA Europa Conference League	
No.	Pos	Nat	Player	Apps	Goals	Apps	Goals	Apps	Goals	Apps	Goals	Apps	Goals
Goalkeepers
12	GK	(Austria) AUT	Heinz Lindner	3	0	1	0	0	0	0	0	2	0
14	GK	(Sweden) SWE	Joachim Imbrechts	3	0	0+1	0	2	0	0	0	0	0
34	GK	(Rwanda) RWA	Maxime Wenssens	0	0	0	0	0	0	0	0	0	0
49	GK	(Luxembourg) LUX	Anthony Moris	53	0	39	0	4	0	8	0	2	0
Defenders
5	DF	(Argentina) ARG	Kevin Mac Allister	47	1	24+7	1	6	0	8	0	2	0
16	DF	(England) ENG	Christian Burgess	52	2	37	1	4	0	8	1	3	0
19	DF	(Belgium) BEL	Guillaume François	7	0	1+4	0	0+2	0	0	0	0	0
26	DF	(England) ENG	Ross Sykes	34	5	19+5	4	4+2	1	0+1	0	1+2	0
27	DF	(Democratic Republic of the Congo) COD	Noah Sadiki	53	0	15+22	0	4+1	0	3+5	0	3	0
28	DF	(Japan) JPN	Koki Machida	45	3	29+2	1	2+1	2	7	0	4	0
48	DF	(Belgium) BEL	Fedde Leysen	9	1	4	0	2+1	1	1+1	0	0	0
Midfielders
4	MF	(Norway) NOR	Mathias Rasmussen	53	5	23+13	2	5+1	1	2+5	0	3+1	2
8	MF	(Ivory Coast) CIV	Lazare Amani	45	0	19+12	0	2+2	0	7+1	0	1+1	0
10	MF	(Madagascar) MAD	Loïc Lapoussin	48	6	26+5	5	3+2	1	7+1	0	3+1	0
21	MF	(Belgium) BEL	Alessio Castro-Montes	47	4	31+2	4	4	0	6	0	4	0
23	MF	(Spain) ESP	Cameron Puertas	56	14	39+1	11	3+1	0	8	2	3+1	1
24	MF	(Belgium) BEL	Charles Vanhoutte	54	1	36+3	1	4+1	0	7	0	3	0
35	MF	(Belgium) BEL	Nathan Huygevelde	4	0	0+2	0	0	0	0+1	0	0+1	0
Forwards
7	FW	(Belgium) BEL	Elton Kabangu	19	1	0+15	1	1+2	0	0+1	0	0	0
9	FW	(Germany) GER	Dennis Eckert	44	11	15+16	8	1+2	0	3+3	2	1+3	1
11	FW	(Germany) GER	Henok Teklab	30	1	9+12	1	3	0	0+2	0	1+3	0
13	FW	(Ecuador) ECU	Kevin Rodríguez	30	4	4+16	3	3+1	1	2+4	0	0	0
17	FW	(Finland) FIN	Casper Terho	32	4	11+10	3	2+1	0	3+4	1	1	0
29	FW	(Sweden) SWE	Gustaf Nilsson	49	17	26+9	16	4	0	3+3	0	4	1
47	FW	(Algeria) ALG	Mohamed Amoura	45	25	25+7	18	3+1	2	5+1	2	3	3
Players who have made an appearance this season but have left the club
2	DF	(Netherlands) NED	Bart Nieuwkoop	2	0	2	0	0	0	0	0	0	0
3	DF	(Belgium) BEL	Viktor Boone	0	0	0	0	0	0	0	0	0	0
	DF	(Belgium) BEL	Senne Lynen	2	0	2	0	0	0	0	0	0	0
15	DF	(England) ENG	Matthew Sorinola	0	0	0	0	0	0	0	0	0	0
