= 2022–23 RCD Espanyol season =

RCD Espanyol
2022–23 season
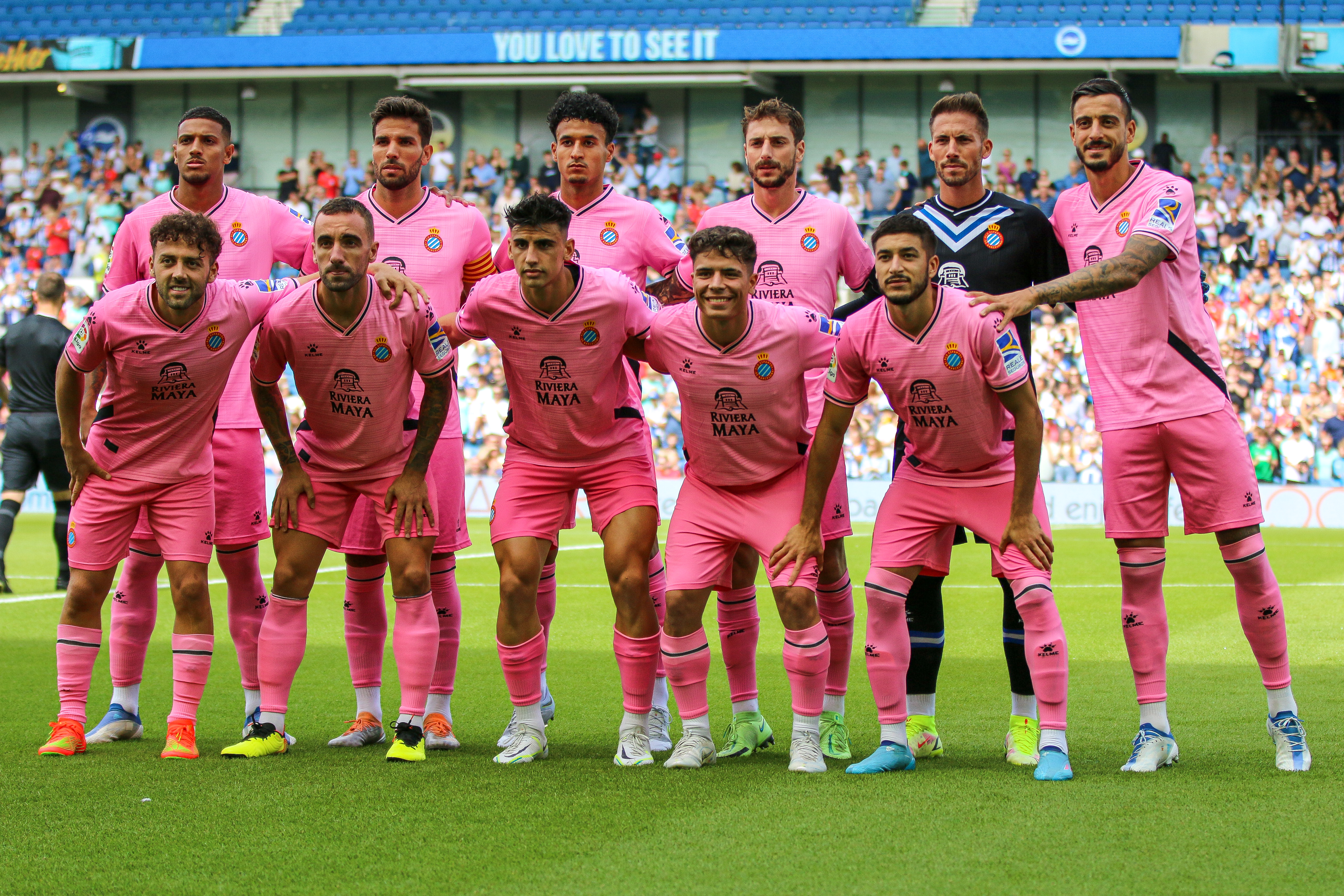
- Owner: Rastar Group
- President: Chen Yansheng
- Head coach: Diego Martínez (until 3 April); Luis García (from 3 April)
- Stadium: RCDE Stadium
- La Liga: 19th (relegated)
- Copa del Rey: Round of 16
- Top goalscorer: League: Joselu (16); All: Joselu (17)
Home colours	Away colours	Third colours

The 2022–23 season was the 88th season in the history of RCD Espanyol and their second consecutive season in the top flight. The club participated in La Liga and the Copa del Rey.

== First team ==
As of 27 January 2023.

Note: Flags indicate national team as defined under FIFA eligibility rules; some limited exceptions apply. Players may hold more than one non-FIFA nationality.

No.	Pos.	Nation	Player
1	GK	ESP	Joan García
2	DF	ESP	Óscar Gil
3	DF	ESP	Adrià Pedrosa
4	DF	URU	Leandro Cabrera (captain)
5	DF	ESP	Fernando Calero
6	MF	ESP	Pol Lozano
7	FW	ESP	Javi Puado
8	MF	ALB	Keidi Bare
9	FW	ESP	Joselu
10	MF	ESP	Sergi Darder (vice-captain)
12	MF	BRA	Vinícius Souza (on loan from Lommel)

No.	Pos.	Nation	Player
14	DF	ESP	Brian Oliván
16	MF	ESP	José Carlos Lazo
17	FW	DEN	Martin Braithwaite
19	FW	ESP	Dani Gómez (on loan from Levante)
20	MF	ESP	Edu Expósito
21	MF	ESP	Nico Melamed
22	DF	ESP	Aleix Vidal
23	DF	MEX	César Montes
24	DF	ESP	Sergi Gómez
25	GK	ESP	Álvaro Fernández (on loan from Huesca)
—	DF	FRA	Ronaël Pierre-Gabriel (on loan from Mainz)

=== Reserve team ===
Note: Flags indicate national team as defined under FIFA eligibility rules; some limited exceptions apply. Players may hold more than one non-FIFA nationality.

No.	Pos.	Nation	Player
26	DF	MAR	Omar El Hilali
27	DF	ESP	Rubén Sánchez
28	DF	ESP	Simo Keddari
30	FW	ITA	Luca Koleosho
31	MF	ESP	Dani Villahermosa

No.	Pos.	Nation	Player
32	FW	MAR	Nabil Touaizi
33	FW	ESP	Kenneth Soler
34	GK	ESP	Ángel Fortuño
35	MF	ESP	Roger Martínez

=== Out on loan ===
Note: Flags indicate national team as defined under FIFA eligibility rules; some limited exceptions apply. Players may hold more than one non-FIFA nationality.

No.	Pos.	Nation	Player
—	DF	ESP	Álvaro García (at Ibiza until 30 June 2023)
—	DF	ESP	Miguelón (at Cartagena until 30 June 2023)
—	DF	ESP	Víctor Gómez (at Braga until 30 June 2023)
—	MF	NED	Tonny Vilhena (at Salernitana until 30 June 2023)

No.	Pos.	Nation	Player
—	FW	ESP	Álvaro Vadillo (at Eibar until 30 June 2023)
—	FW	ESP	Jofre Carreras (at Mirandés until 30 June 2023)
—	FW	BEL	Landry Dimata (at NEC Nijmegen until 30 June 2023)
—	FW	ESP	Max Svensson (at Deportivo La Coruña until 30 June 2023)

== Transfers ==
=== In ===
No.	Pos	Player	Transferred from	Fee	Date	Source
–	DF	(Spain) Brian Oliván	(Spain) Mallorca	Free transfer	21 June 2022	
–	FW	(Spain) Joselu	(Spain) Alavés	Free transfer	27 June 2022	
–	MF	(Spain) Pol Lozano	(Spain) Girona	Loan Return	30 June 2022	
–	FW	(Spain) Juan Camilo Becerra	(Spain) Gimnàstic	Loan Return	30 June 2022	
–	FW	(Spain) Matías Vargas	(Turkey) Adana Demirspor	Loan Return	30 June 2022	
–	FW	(Spain) Álvaro Vadillo	(Spain) Málaga	Loan Return	30 June 2022	
31	DF	(Spain) Victor Gómez	(Spain) Málaga	Loan Return	30 June 2022	
19	MF	(Netherlands) Tonny Vilhena	(Russia) Krasnodar	€2.6m	12 July 2022	

=== Out ===
Date	Player	To	Type	Fee	Ref
1 July 2022	(Spain) Diego López	Rayo Vallecano	End of contract		
1 July 2022	(Spain) Víctor Gómez	(Portugal) Braga	Loan		
1 July 2022	(Spain) Óscar Melendo	Released			
1 July 2022	(Spain) Fran Mérida	Released			
1 July 2022	(Spain) Oier Olazábal	Released			
1 July 2022	(Spain) Dídac Vilà	Released			
12 August 2022	(China) Wu Lei	(China) Shanghai Port	Undisclosed		

== Pre-season and friendlies ==
Win Draw Loss Fixtures

16 July 2022 Friendly	Espanyol	2–0	Montpellier	Sant Adrià de Besòs
18:30 CEST (UTC+2)	Melamed 44'; Vinícius (yellow card) 63'; Villahermosa 83'	Report	Mendes (yellow card) 15'; Chotard (yellow card) 42'; Khazri (yellow card) 63'; Ferri (red card) 87'	Stadium: Ciutat Esportiva Dani Jarque

22 July 2022 Friendly	Espanyol	0–0	Las Palmas	Marbella
19:15 CEST (UTC+2)	Gil (yellow card) 15'	Report		Stadium: Marbella Football Center

24 July 2022 Friendly	Espanyol	2–0	Lille	Marbella
10:30 CEST (UTC+2)	Darder (yellow card) 21'; Joselu 59'; Puado 65'		Fonte (yellow card) 22'; Ribeiro (yellow card) 28'	Stadium: Marbella Football Center

28 July 2022 Friendly	Espanyol	0–1	Linense	Marbella
11:00 CEST (UTC+2)			Oliva 89'	Stadium: Marbella Football Center

30 July 2022 Friendly	Brighton & Hove Albion	5–1	Espanyol	Falmer, England
15:00 BST (UTC+1)	Webster 17'; Dunk 47'; Trossard 54', 63', 69'		Joselu 77'	Stadium: Falmer Stadium; Referee: Stuart Attwell

6 August 2022 Friendly	Napoli	0–0	Espanyol	Castel di Sangro
20:30 CEST (UTC+2)	Osimhen (yellow card) 44'; Juan Jesus (yellow card) 82'; Demme (yellow card) 88'		Gómez (yellow card) 44'; Vinícius (yellow card) 45'; Cabrera (yellow card) 45'; Oliván (yellow card) 79'; Villahermosa (yellow card) 90+3'	Stadium: Stadio Teofilo Patini; Referee: Gabriele Scatena (Italy)

10 December 2022 Friendly	Espanyol	0–1	Torino	San Pedro del Pinatar, Spain
16:00 CET (UTC+1)				Stadium: Pinatar Arena Football Center

14 December 2022 Friendly	Espanyol	1–1	Mechelen	San Pedro del Pinatar, Spain
12:00 CET (UTC+1)				Stadium: Pinatar Arena

== Competitions ==
=== Overall record ===
Competition	First match	Last match	Starting round	Final position	Record							
Competition	First match	Last match	Starting round	Final position	Pld	W	D	L	GF	GA	GD	Win %
La Liga	13 August 2022	4 June 2023	Matchday 1	19th	38	8	13	17	52	69	−17	21.05
Copa del Rey	12 November 2022	18 January 2023	First round	Round of 16	4	3	0	1	7	2	+5	75.00
Total					42	11	13	18	59	71	−12	26.19

Source: Soccerway

=== La Liga ===
==== League table ====
Pos	Team	Pld	W	D	L	GF	GA	GD	Pts	Qualification or relegation
16	Valencia	38	11	9	18	42	45	−3	42 (Note: Head-to-head points: Cádiz 8, Getafe 5, Valencia 3.)	
17	Almería	38	11	8	19	49	65	−16	41	
18	Valladolid (R)	38	11	7	20	33	63	−30	40	Relegation to Segunda División
19	Espanyol (R)	38	8	13	17	52	69	−17	37	Relegation to Segunda División
20	Elche (R)	38	5	10	23	30	67	−37	25	Relegation to Segunda División

Source: LaLiga Santander
Rules for classification: 1) Points; 2) Head-to-head points; 3) Head-to-head goal difference; 4) Goal difference; 5) Goals scored; 6) Fair-play points (Note: Head-to-head record is used only after all the matches between the teams in question have been played)
(R) Relegated

==== Results summary ====
Overall								Home						Away					
Pld	W	D	L	GF	GA	GD	Pts	W	D	L	GF	GA	GD	W	D	L	GF	GA	GD
38	8	13	17	52	69	−17	37	4	7	8	27	35	−8	4	6	9	25	34	−9

Source: La Liga

==== Results by round ====
Round	1	2	3	4	5	6	7	8	9	10	11	12	13	14	15	16	17	18	19	20	21	22	23	24	25	26	27	28	29	30	31	32	33	34	35	36	37	38
Ground	A	H	H	A	H	A	H	A	H	A	H	A	A	H	A	H	A	H	A	H	H	A	H	A	A	H	A	H	A	H	A	H	A	H	A	H	A	H
Result	D	L	L	W	L	L	D	D	W	L	D	D	D	L	D	D	W	W	L	D	L	W	W	L	L	L	L	L	L	D	L	W	L	L	W	D	D	D
Position	9	15	16	15	15	17	16	17	13	16	14	15	16	16	16	19	14	13	15	15	17	13	12	13	15	17	18	19	19	19	19	18	19	19	19	19	19	19

Source: La Liga
A = Away; H = Home; W = Win; D = Draw; L = Loss

==== Matches ====
The league fixtures were announced on 23 June 2022.

13 August 2022 1	Celta Vigo	2–2	Espanyol	Vigo
17:00 CEST (UTC+2)	Mallo (yellow card) 15'; Aidoo (yellow card) 37'; Aspas 45+2', (yellow card) 80'; Paciência 63'; Galán (yellow card) 90+2'; Marchesín (yellow card) 90+7'	Report	Vinícius (yellow card) 60'; Expósito 72'; Gil (yellow card) 90+1'; Joselu 90+8'	Stadium: Balaídos; Attendance: 13,859; Referee: Miguel Ángel Ortiz Arias

19 August 2022 2	Espanyol	0–2	Rayo Vallecano	Cornellà de Llobregat
20:00 CEST (UTC+2)	Gil (yellow card) 7'; S. Gómez (red card) 30'; Oliván (yellow card) 45+3'	Report	Lejeune (yellow card) 14' (yellow-red card) 16'; Dimitrievski (yellow card) 24'; Trejo (yellow card) 36'; Palazón 40'; Ciss 59'; Valentín (yellow card) 76'	Stadium: RCDE Stadium; Attendance: 16,071; Referee: Jorge Figueroa Vázquez

28 August 2022 3	Espanyol	1–3	Real Madrid	Cornellà de Llobregat
22:00 CEST (UTC+2)	Joselu 43'; Lecomte (red card) 90+6'	Report	Vinícius 12'; Benzema 88', 90+10'	Stadium: RCDE Stadium; Attendance: 25,778; Referee: Mario Melero López

4 September 2022 4	Athletic Bilbao	0–1	Espanyol	Bilbao
16:15 CEST (UTC+2)	Sancet (yellow card) 54'; De Marcos (yellow card) 90'; Vencedor (yellow card) 90+3'	Report	Cabrera (yellow card) 45+3'; Braithwaite 83'; D. Gómez (yellow card) 90+1'	Stadium: San Mamés; Attendance: 41,574; Referee: Juan Martínez Munuera

10 September 2022 5	Espanyol	2–3	Sevilla	Cornellà de Llobregat
16:15 CEST (UTC+2)	Gil (yellow card) 13'; Joselu (yellow card) 42', (goal) 45+4' (pen.); Vinícius (yellow card) 58'; Braithwaite 62'; D. Gómez (yellow card) 90+6'	Report	Lamela 1', (yellow card) 29' (yellow-red card) 84'; Carmona 26', 45'; Acuña (yellow card) 45+2'; Fernando (yellow card) 90+4'; En-Nesyri (yellow card) 90+6'	Stadium: RCDE Stadium; Attendance: 20,135; Referee: Guillermo Cuadra Fernández

18 September 2022 6	Real Sociedad	2–1	Espanyol	San Sebastián
18:30 CEST (UTC+2)	Méndez 17', (yellow card) 82'; Sørloth 29', (yellow card) 88'; Elustondo (yellow card) 83'	Report	Expósito 19'	Stadium: Anoeta; Attendance: 31,511; Referee: Carlos del Cerro Grande

2 October 2022 7	Espanyol	2–2	Valencia	Cornellà de Llobregat
14:00 CEST (UTC+2)	Joselu 56'; Darder (yellow card) 58', (goal) 83'; Oliván (yellow card) 76'; Braithwaite (red card) 90+2'	Report	Gabriel 53'; Marcos André (red card) 85'; Cömert 90+6'; Diakhaby (yellow card) 90+8'	Stadium: RCDE Stadium; Attendance: 19,766; Referee: Valentín Pizarro Gómez

9 October 2022 8	Cádiz	2–2	Espanyol	Cádiz
16:15 CEST (UTC+2)	San Emeterio (yellow card) 32'; Chust (yellow card) 36', (goal) 41'; Zaldúa (yellow card) 47'; Ocampo (yellow card) 69'; Pérez 78'	Report	Joselu 51', 67'; Vidal (yellow card) 68'; Gil (yellow card) 90+2'; Lozano (yellow card) 90+3'	Stadium: Nuevo Mirandilla; Attendance: 16,572; Referee: Alejandro Hernández Hernández

16 October 2022 9	Espanyol	1–0	Valladolid	Cornellà de Llobregat
18:30 CEST (UTC+2)	Vinícius (yellow card) 63'; Joselu 78'	Report	Feddal (yellow card) 15'; Escudero (yellow card) 31'; Monchu (yellow card) 52'; Mesa (yellow card) 59'	Stadium: RCDE Stadium; Attendance: 17,770; Referee: Antonio Mateu Lahoz

20 October 2022 10	Osasuna	1–0	Espanyol	Pamplona
20:00 CEST (UTC+2)	Braithwaite (yellow card) 53'; Budimir 55'	Report	D. García (yellow card) 27'; Calero (yellow card) 73'	Stadium: El Sadar; Attendance: 17,832; Referee: Mario Melero López

23 October 2022 11	Espanyol	2–2	Elche	Cornellà de Llobregat
14:00 CEST (UTC+2)	Vinícius (yellow card) 4'; Puado 24'; Braithwaite 67'; Vidal (yellow card) 82'	Report	Milla 11'; Palacios (yellow card) 45'; Boyé (yellow card) 49'; Mascarell (yellow card) 78'; Verdú 82'	Stadium: RCDE Stadium; Attendance: 17,560; Referee: José Luis Munuera Montero

28 October 2022 12	Mallorca	1–1	Espanyol	Palma
21:00 CEST (UTC+2)	Ruiz de Galarreta (yellow card) 45+1'; Muriqi 48'; González (yellow card) 76'; Raíllo (yellow card) 89'; Valjent (yellow card) 90+4'	Report	Lazo 70'; Darder (yellow card) 78'	Stadium: Visit Mallorca Stadium; Attendance: 13,982; Referee: Isidro Díaz de Mera Escuderos

6 November 2022 13	Atlético Madrid	1–1	Espanyol	Madrid
14:00 CET (UTC+1)	Kondogbia (yellow card) 59'; Félix 78', (yellow card) 88'; Giménez (yellow card) 83'	Report	Cabrera (red card) 28'; Oliván (yellow card) 34'; Braithwaite (yellow card) 53'; Darder 62'; Lecomte (yellow card) 74'; Vidal (yellow card) 85'; Omar (yellow card) 90+5'	Stadium: Cívitas Metropolitano; Attendance: 50,007; Referee: Juan Luis Pulido Santana

9 November 2022 14	Espanyol	0–1	Villarreal	Cornellà de Llobregat
20:00 CET (UTC+1)	Melamed (yellow card) 89'	Report	Capoue (yellow card) 38'; Lecomte 64' (o.g.); Pino (yellow card) 79'; Albiol (yellow card) 90+2'	Stadium: RCDE Stadium; Attendance: 17,400; Referee: Javier Iglesias Villanueva

31 December 2022 15	Barcelona	1–1	Espanyol	Barcelona
14:00 CET (UTC+1)	Alonso 7'; Fati (yellow card) 25'; Gavi (yellow card) 30'; Alba (yellow card) 74' (yellow-red card) 78'; Torres (yellow card) 75'; Pedri (yellow card) 76'; Raphinha (yellow card) 90+5'	Report	Oliván (yellow card) 30'; Cabrera (yellow card) 31'; Calero (yellow card) 55'; Joselu 73' (pen.); Vinícius (yellow card) 74' (yellow-red card) 80'; Expósito (yellow card) 74'; Puado (yellow card) 90+6'	Stadium: Camp Nou; Attendance: 88,095; Referee: Antonio Mateu Lahoz

7 January 2023 16	Espanyol	2–2	Girona	Cornellà de Llobregat
21:00 CET (UTC+1)	Expósito (yellow card) 4'; Oliván (yellow card) 21'; Puado 51'; Joselu 76'; Montes (yellow card) 87'	Report	Castellanos (yellow card) 9'; Toni 32'; Herrera 85', (yellow card) 88'	Stadium: RCDE Stadium; Attendance: 21,429; Referee: Carlos del Cerro Grande

15 January 2023 17	Getafe	1–2	Espanyol	Getafe
14:00 CET (UTC+1)	Ünal 7'; Duarte (yellow card) 16'; Álvarez (yellow card) 90'	Report	Joselu 6'; Calero (yellow card) 30'; Cabrera (yellow card) 33'; Montes (yellow card) 51'; Puado 62'	Stadium: Coliseum Alfonso Pérez; Attendance: 10,286; Referee: Jorge Figueroa Vázquez

21 January 2023 18	Espanyol	1–0	Real Betis	Cornellà de Llobregat
16:15 CET (UTC+1)	Puado (yellow card) 27'; Braithwaite 43'; Montes (yellow card) 56'; Sánchez (yellow card) 89'	Report	Rodríguez (yellow card) 24'; Ruibal (yellow card) 90+1'	Stadium: RCDE Stadium; Attendance: 20,811; Referee: Pablo González Fuertes

27 January 2023 19	Almería	3–1	Espanyol	Almería
21:00 CET (UTC+1)	Suárez 21'; Robertone (yellow card) 41'; Baptistão 61'; Portillo 77', (yellow card) 78'; Eguaras (yellow card) 90+7'	Report	Gil (yellow card) 44'; Vinícius (yellow card) 55'; Puado (yellow card) 57'; Joselu 90+3'	Stadium: Estadio de los Juegos Mediterráneos; Attendance: 11,629; Referee: Javier Iglesias Villanueva

4 February 2023 20	Espanyol	1–1	Osasuna	Cornellà de Llobregat
14:00 CET (UTC+1)	Pierre-Gabriel (yellow card) 45+4' (yellow-red card) 45+4'; Vidal (yellow card) 45+4'; Braithwaite 59'	Report	Ezzalzouli (yellow card) 16' (yellow-red card) 45+4'; Gómez (yellow card) 29'; Budimir 45'; U. García (yellow card) 61'; Moncayola (yellow card) 78'	Stadium: RCDE Stadium; Attendance: 22,313; Referee: Jesús Gil Manzano

13 February 2023 21	Espanyol	2–3	Real Sociedad	Cornellà de Llobregat
21:00 CET (UTC+1)	Gil (yellow card) 18'; Braithwaite (yellow card) 57'; Darder 74'; Cabrera (yellow card) 80' (yellow-red card) 90+4'; Oliván 87'	Report	Kubo 23'; Sørloth 51'; Cabrera 63' (o.g.); Fernández (yellow card) 90+7'	Stadium: RCDE Stadium; Attendance: 15,732; Referee: Alejandro Muñiz Ruiz

19 February 2023 22	Elche	0–1	Espanyol	Elche
14:00 CET (UTC+1)	Carmona (yellow card) 71' (yellow-red card) 81'	Report	Gil (yellow card) 43'; Oliván (yellow card) 44'; Darder 90+2'; Expósito (yellow card) 90+6'	Stadium: Martínez Valero; Attendance: 18,963; Referee: Carlos del Cerro Grande

25 February 2023 23	Espanyol	2–1	Mallorca	Cornellà de Llobregat
14:00 CET (UTC+1)	Braithwaite 22', 51'; Gragera (yellow card) 74'; Melamed (yellow card) 83'	Report	Muriqi 41'; Ruiz de Galarreta (yellow card) 62'; Rajković (yellow card) 83'	Stadium: RCDE Stadium; Attendance: 21,403; Referee: Javier Alberola Rojas

5 March 2023 24	Valladolid	2–1	Espanyol	Valladolid
14:00 CET (UTC+1)	I. Sánchez 25'; Mesa (yellow card) 29'; Escudero (yellow card) 40'; Hongla (yellow card) 45+1'; Aguado 62'	Report	Gil (yellow card) 24'; Joselu (yellow card) 75'; Braithwaite 87'	Stadium: José Zorilla; Attendance: 19,212; Referee: Valentín Pizarro Gómez

11 March 2023 25	Real Madrid	3–1	Espanyol	Madrid
14:00 CET (UTC+1)	Vinícius 22', (yellow card) 32'; Militão 39'; Ceballos (yellow card) 86'; Carvajal (yellow card) 88'; Asensio 90+3'	Report	Joselu 8'; Cabrera (yellow card) 19'; Gil (yellow card) 56'	Stadium: Santiago Bernabéu; Attendance: 59,872; Referee: Jorge Figueroa Vázquez

18 March 2023 26	Espanyol	1–3	Celta Vigo	Cornellà de Llobregat
18:30 CET (UTC+1)	Darder (yellow card) 31'; Cabrera (yellow card) 44'; Gragera 86'	Report	Veiga 26'; Aspas 45' (pen.); Galán (yellow card) 62'; Pérez 82'; Larsen (yellow card) 90'	Stadium: RCDE Stadium; Attendance: 26,231; Referee: Guillermo Cuadra Fernández

1 April 2023 27	Girona	2–1	Espanyol	Girona
14:00 CEST (UTC+2)	Romeu (yellow card) 24'; Martín (yellow card) 35'; Martínez 53', (yellow card) 90+3'; Castellanos (yellow card) 71'; Reinier (red card) 71'; Stuani 88' (pen.)	Report	Braithwaite 74'; S. Gómez (red card) 83'; Suárez (yellow card) 83'; Calero (yellow card) 87'	Stadium: Montilivi; Attendance: 12,841; Referee: Miguel Ángel Ortiz Arias
Note: Reinier was sent off for dissent while a substitute.

8 April 2023 28	Espanyol	1–2	Athletic Bilbao	Cornellà de Llobregat
16:15 CEST (UTC+2)	Braithwaite (yellow card) 21'; Gragera (yellow card) 53'; Gil (yellow card) 59'; Calero (yellow card) 78'; Darder 90'; Vidal (yellow card) 90+1' (yellow-red card) 90+1'	Report	De Marcos (yellow card) 21'; I. Williams 22'; D. García (yellow card) 30'; Sancet (yellow card) 44'; N. Williams 75'; Simón (yellow card) 90+4'	Stadium: RCDE Stadium; Attendance: 24,903; Referee: José Luis Munuera Montero

15 April 2023 29	Real Betis	3–1	Espanyol	Seville
18:30 CEST (UTC+2)	Luiz Felipe (yellow card) 15'; Montoya (yellow card) 17'; Pérez 27'; Miranda 34'; Carvalho 69'	Report	Vinícius (yellow card) 38'; Montes 48'; Cabrera (yellow card) 64'	Stadium: Benito Villamarín; Attendance: 45,313; Referee: Alejandro Hernández Hernández

21 April 2023 30	Espanyol	0–0	Cádiz	Cornellà de Llobregat
21:00 CEST (UTC+2)	Gil (yellow card) 10'; Cabrera (yellow card) 26'; Montes (yellow card) 30'; Vidal (yellow card) 67'	Report	San Emeterio (yellow card) 39'; Carcelén (yellow card) 68'	Stadium: RCDE Stadium; Attendance: 28,512; Referee: Juan Martínez Munuera

27 April 2023 31	Villarreal	4–2	Espanyol	Villarreal
19:30 CEST (UTC+2)	Jackson (yellow card) 16', (goal) 80'; Capoue 53', 90+2'; Pino (yellow card) 58'; Parejo (penalty missed) 63', 63'	Report	Calero (yellow card) 40'; Puado 45', (yellow card) 58'; Montes (yellow card) 62'; Joselu 73'; Gil (yellow card) 77'; Expósito (red card) 90+5'	Stadium: Estadio de la Cerámica; Attendance: 16,134; Referee: César Soto Grado

30 April 2023 32	Espanyol	1–0	Getafe	Cornellà de Llobregat
18:30 CEST (UTC+2)	Joselu 38'; Braithwaite (yellow card) 42'; Fernández (yellow card) 47'; Melamed (yellow card) 71'; Vidal (yellow card) 90+1'	Report	Aleñá (yellow card) 37'; Duarte (yellow card) 51'; Maksimović (yellow card) 57'; Villar (yellow card) 73'; Latasa (yellow card) 81'	Stadium: RCDE Stadium; Attendance: 26,953; Referee: José María Sánchez Martínez

4 May 2023 33	Sevilla	3–2	Espanyol	Seville
19:30 CEST (UTC+2)	Gil 22', (yellow card) 45+2'; Ocampos 69' (pen.); Gueye 88'	Report	Rekik 29' (o.g.); Puado 43'; Suárez (yellow card) 62'; Vinícius (yellow card) 90+1'	Stadium: Ramón Sánchez Pizjuán; Attendance: 35,391; Referee: Javier Alberola Rojas

14 May 2023 34	Espanyol	2–4	Barcelona	Cornellà de Llobregat
21:00 CEST (UTC+2)	Darder (yellow card) 39'; Puado 73'; Joselu 90+2'	Report	Koundé (yellow card) 2', (goal) 53'; Lewandowski 11', 40'; Balde 20'; Gavi (yellow card) 39'; Alba (yellow card) 82'	Stadium: RCDE Stadium; Attendance: 27,360; Referee: Ricardo de Burgos Bengoetxea

21 May 2023 35	Rayo Vallecano	1–2	Espanyol	Madrid
14:00 CEST (UTC+2)	Trejo (yellow card) 40'; De Tomás 42'; Catena (yellow card) 70'	Report	Darder 23'; Cabrera (yellow card) 39'; Melamed 59'; Gil (yellow card) 85'	Stadium: Vallecas; Attendance: 12,142; Referee: Alejandro Hernández Hernández

24 May 2023 36	Espanyol	3–3	Atlético Madrid	Cornellà de Llobregat
22:00 CEST (UTC+2)	Montes 64'; Vidal (yellow card) 66'; Joselu 76' (pen.); Vinícius 79', (yellow card) 80'	Report	Saúl 21'; Griezmann 44'; Carrasco 46'; Grbić (yellow card) 75'; Martín (yellow card) 89'; Giménez (yellow card) 90+4'	Stadium: RCDE Stadium; Attendance: 25,822; Referee: Mario Melero López

28 May 2023 37	Valencia	2–2	Espanyol	Valencia
19:00 CEST (UTC+2)	López 38'; Lino 90+3'	Report	Montes (yellow card) 12', (goal) 40'; Gil (yellow card) 37'; Braithwaite 50'; Vidal (yellow card) 90'	Stadium: Mestalla; Attendance: 44,141; Referee: Jesús Gil Manzano

4 June 2023 38	Espanyol	3–3	Almería	Cornellà de Llobregat
21:00 CEST (UTC+2)	Puado 13'; Oliván (yellow card) 30'; Montes (yellow card) 41'; Pierre-Gabriel 49'; Koleosho 73'	Report	Touré 10'; Pozo (yellow card) 30'; Costa (yellow card) 45'; Embarba 58', 87' (pen.); Ramazani (yellow card) 83'; Melero (yellow card) 90+3'	Stadium: RCDE Stadium; Attendance: 14,213; Referee: César Soto Grado

=== Copa del Rey ===
12 November 2022 First round	Rincón	0–3	Espanyol	Málaga
21:00 CET (UTC+1)	Enri (yellow card) 28'; Conejo (red card) 50'; Chechu (yellow card) 61'	Report	Melamed (yellow card) 24'; D. Gómez (red card) 44'; Puado 60'; Gil (yellow card) 61'; Expósito 70'; Lazo (yellow card) 71'; Soler (yellow card) 80'; Joselu 83'	Stadium: La Rosaleda; Referee: Valentín Pizarro Gómez

20 December 2022 Second round	Atlético Paso	0–1	Espanyol	El Paso
22:00 CET (UTC+1)	González (yellow card) 61'	Report	Bare (yellow card) 61'; Melamed 80'; Gil (yellow card) 84'	Stadium: Municipal; Attendance: 5,000; Referee: César Soto Grado

3 January 2023 Round of 32	Espanyol	3–1 (a.e.t.)	Celta Vigo	Cornellà de Llobregat
19:00 CET (UTC+1)	Martínez (yellow card) 25'; Vinícius (yellow card) 32'; Puado 53'; Vidal (yellow card) 69'; Cabrera (yellow card) 79'; Darder 97'; Melamed (yellow card) 100', (goal) 118'	Report	Vázquez (yellow card) 12'; Paciência 15'; Tapia (yellow card) 27'; Beltrán (yellow card) 51'; Aidoo (yellow card) 64'; Larsen (yellow card) 73'; Marchesín (yellow card) 97' (yellow-red card) 112'; Rodriguez (yellow card) 120'	Stadium: RCDE Stadium; Attendance: 20,050; Referee: Juan Martínez Munuera

18 January 2023 Round of 16	Athletic Bilbao	1–0	Espanyol	Bilbao
20:00 CET (UTC+1)	De Marcos 27'; Yeray (yellow card) 45'	Report	Puado (yellow card) 36'; Sánchez (yellow card) 44'; S. Gómez (yellow card) 45+3'; Vinícius (yellow card) 90+3'	Stadium: San Mamés; Attendance: 37,564; Referee: Juan Luis Pulido Santana

== Statistics ==
=== Appearances and goals ===
Last updated 5 March 2023

No.	Pos	Nat	Player	Total		La Liga		Copa del Rey	
No.	Pos	Nat	Player	Apps	Goals	Apps	Goals	Apps	Goals
Goalkeepers
1	GK	(Spain) ESP	Joan García	3	0	0	0	3	0
13	GK	(Spain) ESP	Fernando Pacheco	3	0	3	0	0	0
25	GK	(Spain) ESP	Álvaro Fernández	12	0	11	0	1	0
Defenders
2	DF	(Spain) ESP	Óscar Gil	23	0	19+1	0	1+2	0
3	DF	(Spain) ESP	Adrià Pedrosa	0	0	0	0	0	0
4	DF	(Uruguay) URU	Leandro Cabrera	25	0	20+1	0	4	0
5	DF	(Spain) ESP	Fernando Calero	20	0	15+3	0	1+1	0
14	MF	(Spain) ESP	Brian Oliván	26	1	23	1	3	0
18	FW	(France) FRA	Ronaël Pierre-Gabriel	4	0	1+3	0	0	0
22	DF	(Spain) ESP	Aleix Vidal	21	0	10+8	0	1+2	0
23	MF	(Mexico) MEX	César Montes	9	0	6+1	0	2	0
24	DF	(Spain) ESP	Sergi Gómez	19	0	15+3	0	1	0
26	DF	(Morocco) MAR	Omar El Hilali	6	0	1+4	0	1	0
27	DF	(Spain) ESP	Rubén Sánchez	14	0	4+8	0	2	0
28	DF	(Spain) ESP	Simo	7	0	0+5	0	2	0
Midfielders
6	MF	(Spain) ESP	Denis Suárez	7	0	3+2	0	1+1	0
8	MF	(Albania) ALB	Keidi Bare	13	0	3+8	0	1+1	0
10	MF	(Spain) ESP	Sergi Darder	27	5	24	4	1+2	1
12	MF	(Brazil) BRA	Vinícius Souza	25	0	22	0	2+1	0
15	MF	(Spain) ESP	José Gragera	4	0	1+3	0	0	0
16	MF	(Spain) ESP	José Carlos Lazo	14	1	0+10	1	3+1	0
20	MF	(Spain) ESP	Edu Expósito	24	3	11+9	2	3+1	1
21	MF	(Spain) ESP	Nico Melamed	22	2	7+11	0	2+2	2
30	MF	(Italy) ITA	Luca Koleosho	3	0	0+2	0	0+1	0
31	MF	(Spain) ESP	Dani Villahermosa	1	0	0	0	1	0
35	MF	(Spain) ESP	Roger Martínez	2	0	0+1	0	1	0
Forwards
9	FW	(Spain) ESP	Joselu	27	12	16+7	11	3+1	1
7	FW	(Spain) ESP	Javi Puado	25	5	20+1	3	2+2	2
17	FW	(Denmark) DEN	Martin Braithwaite	21	8	19	8	1+1	0
19	FW	(Spain) ESP	Dani Gómez	8	0	0+7	0	1	0
32	FW	(Morocco) MAR	Nabil Touaizi	1	0	0+1	0	0	0
33	FW	(Spain) ESP	Kenneth Soler	1	0	0	0	0+1	0
Players who have made an appearance or had a squad number this season but have left the club
13	GK	(France) FRA	Benjamin Lecomte	10	0	10	0	0	0
6	MF	(Spain) ESP	Pol Lozano	6	0	0+4	0	1+1	0
