= Gustaf Nilsson (footballer, born 1997) =

Swedish footballer (born 1997)

- Nilsson with Sweden in 2026

Personal information
- Full name: Håkan Gustaf Nilsson
- Date of birth: 23 May 1997 (age 29)
- Place of birth: Falkenberg, Sweden
- Height: 1.97 m (6 ft 6 in)
- Position: Forward

Team information
- Current team: Hertha BSC (on loan from Club Brugge)
- Number: 9

Youth career
- Falkenbergs FF

Senior career*
| Years | Team | Apps | (Gls) |
| 2014–2016 | Falkenbergs FF | 31 | (8) |
| 2016–2018 | Brøndby IF | 11 | (1) |
| 2017–2018 | → Silkeborg IF (loan) | 26 | (4) |
| 2018–2019 | Vejle BK | 19 | (2) |
| 2019–2020 | BK Häcken | 19 | (2) |
| 2020 | → Falkenbergs FF (loan) | 6 | (0) |
| 2021–2022 | Wehen Wiesbaden | 45 | (18) |
| 2022–2024 | Union SG | 65 | (21) |
| 2024– | Club Brugge | 36 | (9) |
| 2026– | → Hertha BSC (loan) | 5 | (1) |

International career^{‡}
| 2014–2016 | Sweden U19 | 10 | (5) |
| 2015–2018 | Sweden U21 | 6 | (0) |
| 2018– | Sweden | 11 | (4) |
- * Club domestic league appearances and goals as of 13:30, 11 November 2026 (UTC) ‡ National team caps and goals as of 16:05, 1 July 2026 (UTC)

Håkan Gustaf Nilsson (born 23 May 1997) is a Swedish professional footballer who plays as a forward for 2. Bundesliga club Hertha BSC, on loan from Belgian Pro League club Club Brugge, and the Sweden national team.

== Club career ==
The son of Falkenbergs FF second highest ever goal scorer Håkan Nilsson, Gustaf followed in his father’s footsteps and started his career at Falkenbergs FF. He got promoted to the first team in 2014 and made his senior debut in July in a Allsvenskan match against Mjällby AIF. In the upcoming fixture he scored his first goal in a 4-1 victory against AIK.

On 22 January 2016 he signed a four-year pre-contract with the Danish team Brøndby IF starting from the summer of 2016. On 5 January 2021 Nilsson signed for SV Wehen Wiesbaden in the German 3. Liga.

On 28 July 2022, Nilsson signed a three-year contract with Union SG in Belgium.

On 12 July 2024, Club Brugge announced they had signed Nilsson from Union on a four-year contract.

== International career ==
Nilsson made his debut for Sweden men's national football team on 7 January 2018 in a friendly game against Estonia. On 11 January 2018, he scored in the 90th minute to give his country a 1–0 victory in a friendly against Denmark.

More than six years later, on 21 March 2024, Nilsson played his third match for Sweden and scored in a 5–2 defeat away against Portugal. Four days later, Nilsson scored the winning goal against Albania in a 1–0 home win.

Nilsson made his competitive debut for Sweden on 8 September 2024 in a UEFA Nations League game against Estonia, replacing Alexander Isak in the 79th minute of a 3–0 win.

On 12 May 2026, Nilsson was named in the Sweden squad for the 2026 FIFA World Cup. He made his FIFA World Cup debut on 30 June 2026 in a round of 32 game against France, replacing Alexander Isak in the 89th minute of a 0–3 loss.

== Career statistics ==
=== Club ===
As of match played 22 April 2026

Appearances and goals by club, season and competition
| Club | Season | League | | | National cup (Note: Includes Svenska Cupen, Danish Cup, DFB-Pokal, Belgian Cup) | | Europe | | Other | | Total | |
| Club | Season | Division | Apps | Goals | Apps | Goals | Apps | Goals | Apps | Goals | Apps | Goals |
|---|---|---|---|---|---|---|---|---|---|---|---|---|
| Falkenbergs FF | 2014 | Allsvenskan | 5 | 1 | 2 | 0 | — | | — | | 7 | 1 |
| Falkenbergs FF | 2015 | Allsvenskan | 21 | 6 | 1 | 0 | — | | 2 (Note: Appearances in Relegation play-off) | 0 | 24 | 6 |
| Falkenbergs FF | 2016 | Allsvenskan | 5 | 1 | 2 | 0 | — | | — | | 7 | 1 |
| Falkenbergs FF | Total | | 31 | 8 | 5 | 0 | — | | 2 | 0 | 38 | 8 |
| Brøndby | 2016–17 | Danish Superliga | 11 | 1 | 3 | 0 | 0 | 0 | — | | 14 | 1 |
| Silkeborg (loan) | 2017–18 | Danish Superliga | 26 | 4 | 3 | 0 | — | | 5 (Note: Appearances in Danish Superliga Championship play-offs) | 0 | 34 | 4 |
| Vejle BK | 2018–19 | Danish Superliga | 19 | 2 | 0 | 0 | — | | 2 | 0 | 21 | 2 |
| BK Häcken | 2019 | Allsvenskan | 11 | 1 | 0 | 0 | — | | — | | 11 | 1 |
| BK Häcken | 2020 | Allsvenskan | 8 | 1 | 2 | 0 | — | | — | | 10 | 1 |
| BK Häcken | Total | | 19 | 2 | 2 | 0 | — | | — | | 21 | 2 |
| Falkenbergs FF (loan) | 2020 | Allsvenskan | 6 | 0 | 0 | 0 | — | | — | | 6 | 0 |
| Wehen Wiesbaden | 2020–21 | 3. Liga | 14 | 3 | 0 | 0 | — | | — | | 14 | 3 |
| Wehen Wiesbaden | 2021–22 | 3. Liga | 30 | 14 | 1 | 0 | — | | — | | 31 | 14 |
| Wehen Wiesbaden | 2022–23 | 3. Liga | 1 | 1 | 0 | 0 | — | | — | | 1 | 1 |
| Wehen Wiesbaden | Total | | 45 | 18 | 1 | 0 | — | | — | | 46 | 18 |
| Union SG | 2022–23 | Belgian Pro League | 30 | 5 | 5 | 3 | 9 (Note: Appearances in UEFA Europa League) | 2 | — | | 44 | 10 |
| Union SG | 2023–24 | Belgian Pro League | 35 | 16 | 4 | 0 | 10 (Note: Six appearances in UEFA Europa League, four appearances and one goal in UEFA Conference League) | 1 | — | | 49 | 17 |
| Union SG | Total | | 65 | 21 | 9 | 3 | 19 | 3 | 0 | 0 | 93 | 27 |
| Club Brugge | 2024–25 | Belgian Pro League | 29 | 9 | 5 | 1 | 7 (Note: Appearances in UEFA Champions League) | 1 | 1 (Note: Appearance in Belgian Super Cup) | 0 | 42 | 11 |
| Club Brugge | 2025–26 | Belgian Pro League | 7 | 0 | 2 | 0 | 2 | 0 | 0 | 0 | 11 | 0 |
| Club Brugge | Total | | 36 | 9 | 7 | 1 | 9 | 1 | 1 | 0 | 53 | 11 |
| Career total | | | 258 | 65 | 30 | 4 | 28 | 4 | 10 | 0 | 326 | 73 |

=== International ===
As of match played 30 June 2026

Appearances and goals by national team and year
| National team | Year | Apps | Goals |
|---|---|---|---|
| Sweden | 2018 | 2 | 1 |
| Sweden | 2019 | 0 | 0 |
| Sweden | 2020 | 0 | 0 |
| Sweden | 2021 | 0 | 0 |
| Sweden | 2022 | 0 | 0 |
| Sweden | 2023 | 0 | 0 |
| Sweden | 2024 | 5 | 2 |
| Sweden | 2025 | 1 | 0 |
| Sweden | 2026 | 3 | 1 |
| Total | | 11 | 4 |

Scores and results list Sweden's goal tally first, score column indicates score after each Nilsson goal.

List of international goals scored by Gustaf Nilsson
| No. | Date | Venue | Opponent | Score | Result | Competition | Ref. |
|---|---|---|---|---|---|---|---|
| 1 | 11 January 2018 | Zayed Sports City Stadium, Abu Dhabi, United Arab Emirates | Denmark | 1–0 | 1–0 | Friendly | |
| 2 | 21 March 2024 | Estádio D. Afonso Henriques, Guimarães, Portugal | Portugal | 2–5 | 2–5 | Friendly | |
| 3 | 25 March 2024 | Friends Arena, Solna, Sweden | Albania | 1–0 | 1–0 | Friendly | |
| 4 | 4 June 2026 | Strawberry Arena, Solna, Sweden | Greece | 2–1 | 2–2 | Friendly | |

== Honours ==
Wehen Wiesbaden

- Hessian Cup: 2020–21

Union Saint-Gilloise

- Belgian Cup: 2023–24

Club Brugge

- Belgian Pro League: 2025–26
- Belgian Cup: 2024–25
