= Vinícius Souza =

Brazilian footballer (born 1999)

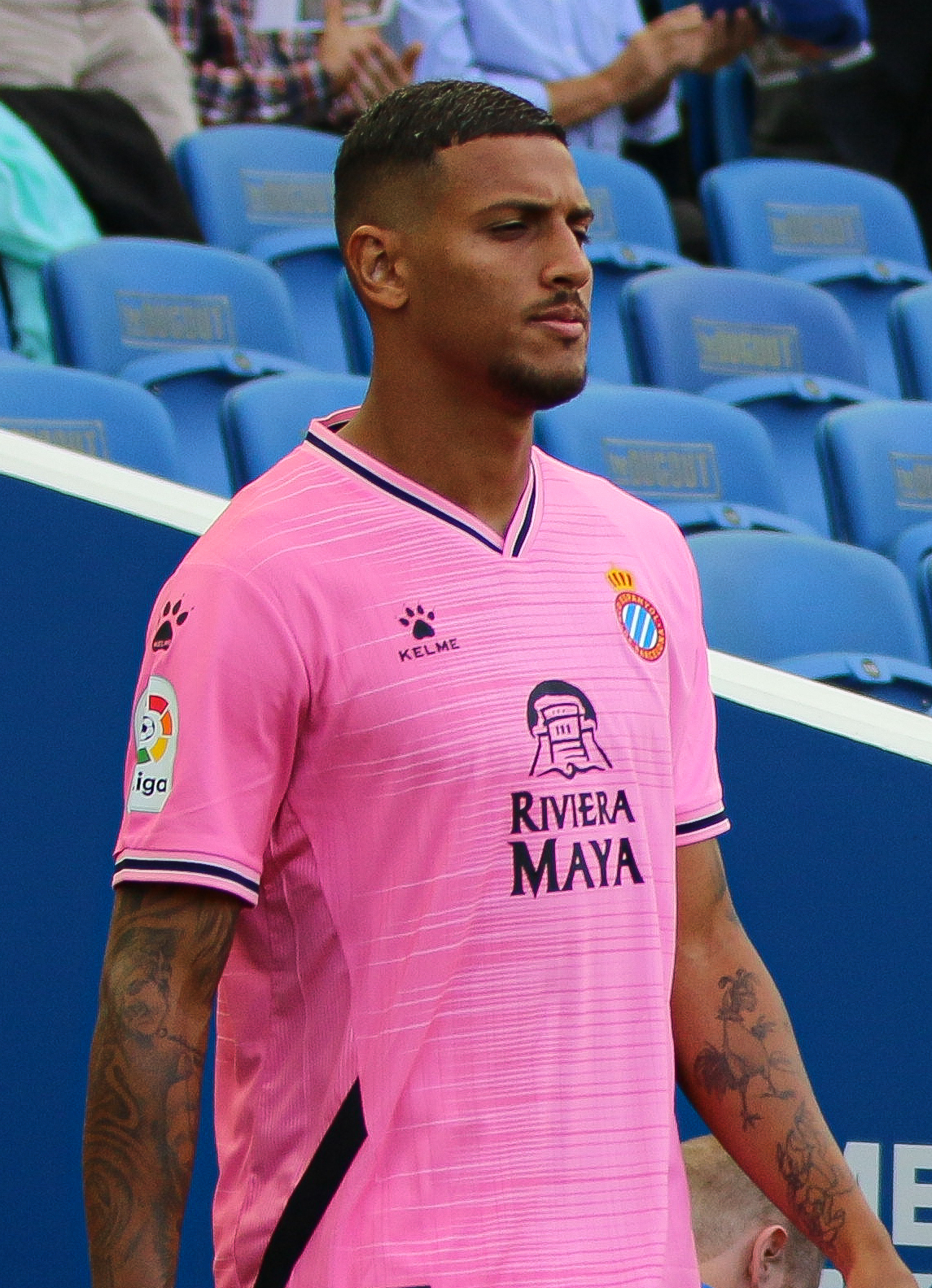
- Vinícius with Espanyol in 2022

Personal information
- Full name: Vinícius de Souza Costa
- Date of birth: 17 June 1999 (age 27)
- Place of birth: Rio de Janeiro, Brazil
- Height: 1.87 m (6 ft 2 in)
- Position: Defensive midfielder

Team information
- Current team: VfL Wolfsburg
- Number: 5

Youth career
- 2014–2019: Flamengo

Senior career*
Years	Team	Apps	(Gls)
2019–2020	Flamengo	8	(0)
2020–2023	Lommel	18	(0)
2021–2022	→ Mechelen (loan)	32	(2)
2022–2023	→ Espanyol (loan)	34	(1)
2023–2025	Sheffield United	71	(1)
2025–	VfL Wolfsburg	30	(2)

International career^{‡}
2017	Brazil U20	3	(0)
- * Club domestic league appearances and goals as of 18 September 2026 (UTC) ‡ National team caps and goals as of 17:17, 26 October 2019 (UTC)

Vinícius de Souza Costa (born 17 June 1999) is a Brazilian professional footballer who plays as a defensive midfielder for 2. Bundesliga club VfL Wolfsburg.

== Career ==
=== Early career ===
Born and raised in Padre Miguel, neighborhood of Rio de Janeiro, Vinícius arrived at Flamengo in 2014 to play in the club's under 15 team approved by coach Zé Ricardo. In the youth team, he played alongside Matheus Thuler and Lincoln, future teammates in the professional team.

=== Flamengo ===
On 9 March 2019, Vinícius debuted in the professional team playing in the final minutes of a Campeonato Carioca 1–1 draw against Vasco da Gama at the Maracanã Stadium.

After the transfer of Gustavo Cuéllar to Al-Hilal in August 2019, head coach Jorge Jesus promoted Vinícius to the professional team. The Portuguese coach praised him very much, comparing him to his former player Nemanja Matić.

On 10 October 2019, Vinícius played his first Campeonato Brasileiro Série A against Atlético Mineiro at the Maracanã Stadium, replacing Reinier in injury time; Flamengo won 3–1.

=== Lommel ===
On 25 August 2020, Lommel signed Vinícius from Flamengo for a fee of €2.5 million.

==== Mechelen (loan) ====
On 1 July 2021, Vinícius joined Mechelen on a season-long loan.

==== Espanyol (loan) ====
On 8 July 2022, Vinícius joined Espanyol on a season-long loan.

=== Sheffield United ===
On 9 August 2023, Vinícius signed a four-year deal with Sheffield United. He made his debut for the club on 12 August, coming on as a substitute in 1–0 loss against Crystal Palace in the Premier League.

=== VfL Wolfsburg ===
On 5 July 2025, Vinícius moved to Germany and joined Bundesliga side VfL Wolfsburg for an undisclosed transfer fee.

== Career statistics ==
As of match played 18 September 2026

Appearances and goals by club, season and competition
Club	Season	League			State league (Note: Includes Campeonato Carioca)		National cup (Note: Includes Belgian Cup, Copa del Rey, FA Cup, DFB-Pokal)		Continental		Other		Total	
Club	Season	Division	Apps	Goals	Apps	Goals	Apps	Goals	Apps	Goals	Apps	Goals	Apps	Goals
Flamengo	2019	Série A	3	0	1	0	0	0	0	0	0	0	4	0
Flamengo	2020	Série A	0	0	4	0	0	0	0	0	0	0	4	0
Flamengo	Total		3	0	5	0	0	0	0	0	0	0	8	0
Lommel	2020–21	Belgian First Division B	18	0	–		1	0	–		–		19	0
Lommel	2022–23	Challenger Pro League	0	0	–		0	0	–		–		0	0
Lommel	Total		18	0	0	0	1	0	0	0	0	0	19	0
Mechelen (loan)	2021–22	Belgian Pro League	32	2	–		3	0	–		–		35	2
Espanyol (loan)	2022–23	La Liga	34	1	–		3	0	–		–		37	1
Sheffield United	2023–24	Premier League	36	1	–		2	0	–		0	0	38	1
Sheffield United	2024–25	Championship	35	0	–		0	0	–		3 (Note: Appearances in Championship play-offs)	0	38	0
Sheffield United	Total		71	1	0	0	2	0	0	0	3	0	76	1
VfL Wolfsburg	2025–26	Bundesliga	24	0	–		2	0	–		1 (Note: Appearance in Bundesliga relegation play-offs)	0	27	0
VfL Wolfsburg	2026–27	2. Bundesliga	6	2	–		1	0	–		–		7	2
VfL Wolfsburg	Total		30	2	–		3	0	–		1	0	34	2
Career total			188	6	5	0	12	0	0	0	4	0	209	6

== Honours ==
Flamengo

- Copa Libertadores: 2019
- Recopa Sudamericana: 2020
- Campeonato Brasileiro Série A: 2019
- Supercopa do Brasil: 2020
- Campeonato Carioca: 2019, 2020
