= Roger Martínez (footballer, born 2004) =

Spanish footballer

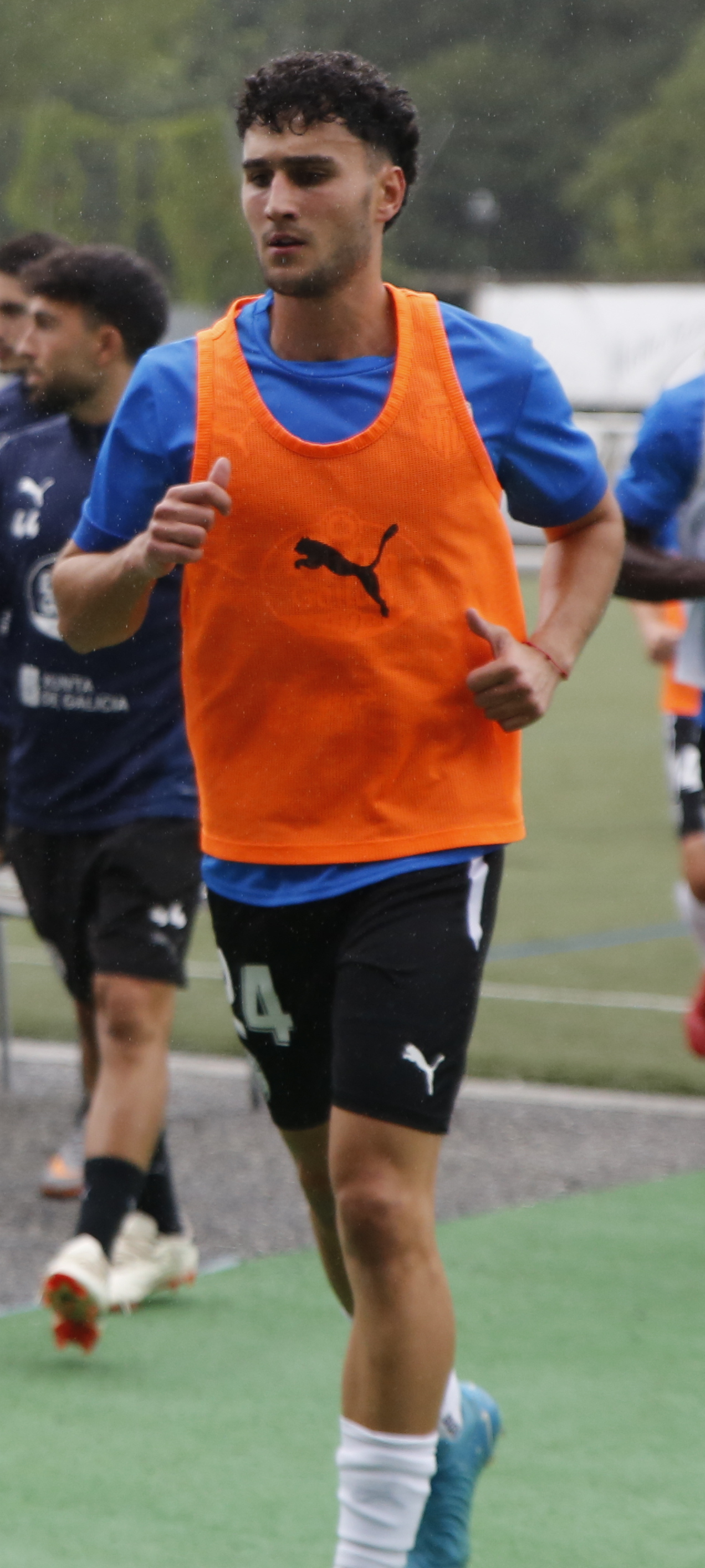
- Martínez with Lugo in 2024

Personal information
- Full name: Roger Martínez Santamaría
- Date of birth: 5 April 2004 (age 22)
- Place of birth: Badalona, Spain
- Height: 1.77 m (5 ft 10 in)
- Position: Midfielder

Team information
- Current team: Al-Markhiya
- Number: 6

Youth career
- 2013–2016: Barcelona
- 2016–2018: Cornellà
- 2018–2021: Espanyol

Senior career*
Years	Team	Apps	(Gls)
2020–2024	Espanyol B	87	(7)
2023–2025	Espanyol	2	(0)
2024–2025	→ Lugo (loan)	34	(1)
2025–2026	Barcelona B	14	(0)
2026–	Al-Markhiya	0	(0)

International career^{‡}
2018–2019	Spain U15	7	(0)
2020	Spain U16	3	(0)
2021–2022	Spain U18	8	(0)
2022–2023	Spain U19	6	(1)
- * Club domestic league appearances and goals as of 15 May 2026 ‡ National team caps and goals as of 21 February 2023

Roger Martínez Santamaría (born 5 April 2004) is a Spanish professional footballer who plays as a midfielder for Qatar Stars League 2 club Al-Markhiya.

== Club career ==
Born in Badalona, Barcelona, Catalonia, Martínez represented FC Barcelona and UE Cornellà before joining RCD Espanyol's youth categories in 2018. He made his senior debut with the reserves at the age of 16 on 15 November 2020, coming on as a late substitute for Iván Gil in a 3–1 Segunda División B home loss against Lleida Esportiu.

Martínez scored his first senior goal on 16 April 2022, netting Espanyol B's second in a 2–1 home win over Terrassa FC. He made his first team debut on 3 January of the following year, starting in a 3–1 home victory against RC Celta de Vigo in the season's Copa del Rey.

Martínez made his La Liga debut on 7 January 2023, replacing Brian Oliván late into a 2–2 home draw against Girona FC. On 25 April 2024, he renewed his contract with the Pericos until 2026, and was loaned to Primera Federación side CD Lugo on 8 August.

On 2 July 2025, Martínez left Espanyol. The following 28 July, free agent Martínez agreed to a two-year contract with Barcelona Atlètic. He made his debut for Barça Atlètic on 22 September, replacing Juan Hernández in a 4–0 home win against CD Castellón B in Segunda Federación.
