= Théo Leoni =

Belgian footballer (born 2000)

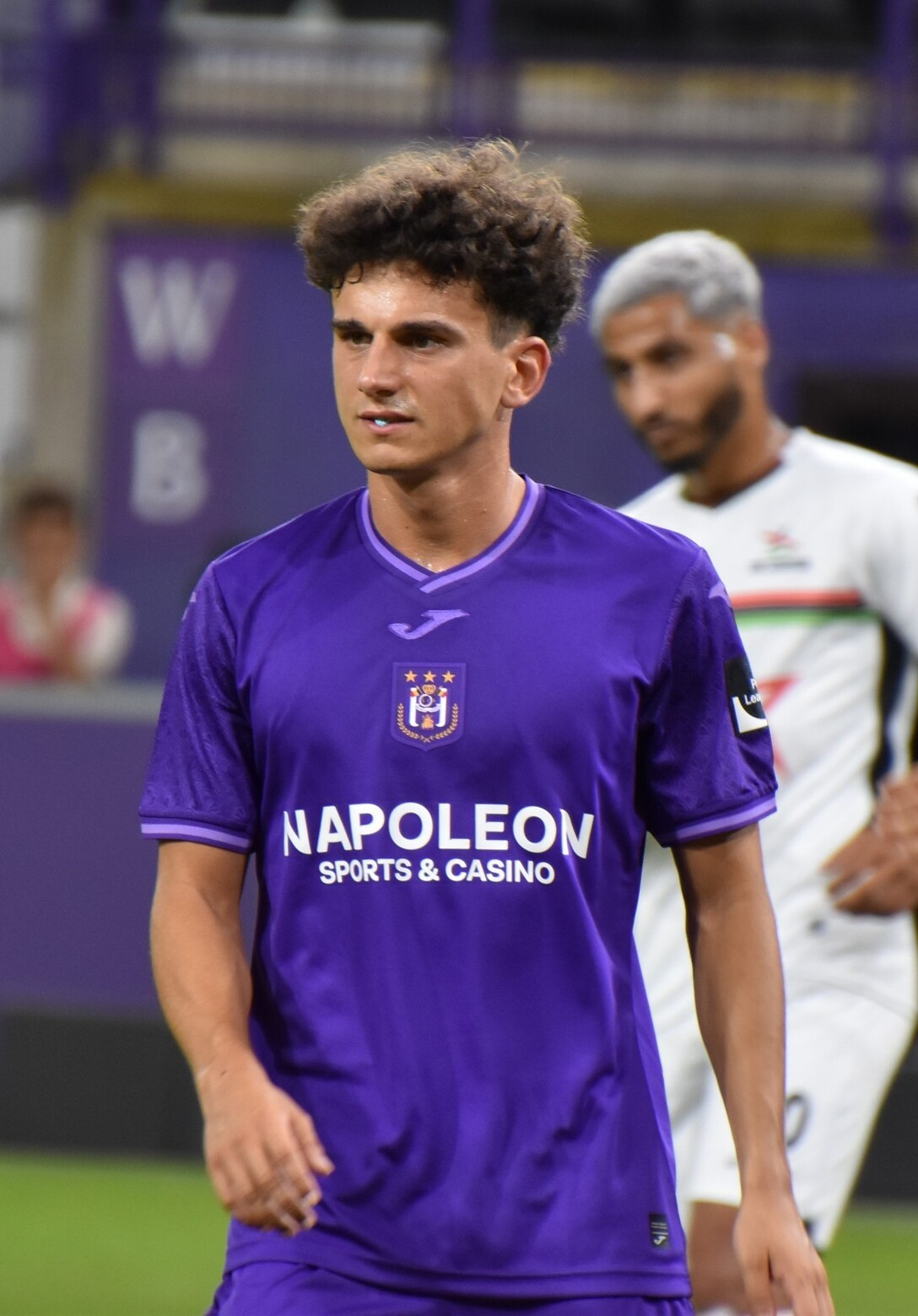
- Théo Leoni with RSC Anderlecht in 2024

Personal information
- Date of birth: 21 April 2000 (age 26)
- Place of birth: Brussels, Belgium
- Height: 1.70 m (5 ft 7 in)
- Position: Midfielder

Team information
- Current team: Reims
- Number: 6

Youth career
- –2012: Charleroi
- 2012–2022: Anderlecht

Senior career*
Years	Team	Apps	(Gls)
2022–2023	RSCA Futures	19	(1)
2022–2025	Anderlecht	71	(7)
2025–	Reims	30	(0)

International career^{‡}
2017	Belgium U17	6	(0)
2019	Belgium U19	4	(0)
- * Club domestic league appearances and goals as of 11 May 2026 ‡ National team caps and goals as of 03:40, 11 October 2023 (UTC)

Théo Leoni (born 21 April 2000) is a Belgian footballer who plays as a midfielder for French Ligue 2 club Reims.

== Career ==
Leoni moved from the youth ranks of R. Charleroi S.C. to Anderlecht in 2012. On 5 September 2017, he signed his first professional contract with Anderlecht. He made his debut for Anderlecht in the Belgian First Division A on 30 October 2022 against K.A.S. Eupen. He had been captaining RSCA Futures in the Challenger Pro League, and been training with the Anderlecht first team since being promoted under former manager Vincent Kompany in 2019. A graceful left-footed playmaker, a debut in the first team prior to 2022 had been delayed by an initial lack of physicality but this part of his game developed with time. This development was to the extent that he has been described as “a revelation at number 8, the engine of the RCSA Futures”. Commenting after his debut at the relatively late age of 22, Leoni said he “had always remained positive” during his ten years at the club despite seeing players younger than him make first team starts before him.

On 27 August 2023, he scored a stunning first goal for Anderlecht during a 2–1 home win against R. Charleroi S. C. in the Belgian Pro League. On 17 August 2024, he made his 50th appearance for the club in a Belgian Pro League match against KV Mechelen in a 1–3 away win, scoring the 3rd goal of the game.

On 3 October 2024, he scored his first European goal in a UEFA Europa League match against Real Sociedad, scoring the winning goal with a great volley from outside of the box.

On 1 September 2025, Leoni joined French Ligue 2 side Reims, signing a five-year contract.

== International career ==
Leoni was born in Belgium to an Italian father and Spanish mother. He is a youth international for Belgium, having played up to the Belgium U19s.

== Career statistics ==
As of match played 1 May 2025

Appearances and goals by club, season and competition
Club	Season	League			National cup		Europe		Other		Total	
Club	Season	Division	Apps	Goals	Apps	Goals	Apps	Goals	Apps	Goals	Apps	Goals
RSCA Futures	2022–23	Challenger Pro League	19	1	—		—		—		19	1
Anderlecht	2022–23	Belgian Pro League	6	0	1	0	0	0	—		7	0
Anderlecht	2023–24	Belgian Pro League	37	5	2	0	—		—		39	5
Anderlecht	2024–25	Belgian Pro League	27	2	4	0	10 (Note: Appearances in UEFA Europa League)	1	—		41	3
Anderlecht	Total		70	7	7	0	10	1	—		87	8
Career total			89	8	7	0	10	1	0	0	106	9
