= Iebe Swers =

Belgian footballer

Personal information
- Date of birth: 27 December 1996 (age 29)
- Place of birth: Hasselt, Belgium
- Height: 1.75 m (5 ft 9 in)
- Position: Right-back

Team information
- Current team: Thes Sport
- Number: 2

Youth career
- Sint-Truiden

Senior career*
Years	Team	Apps	(Gls)
2013–2019	Sint-Truiden	29	(0)
2017–2018	→ Lommel (loan)	30	(1)
2019	→ Seraing (loan)	14	(0)
2019–2021	Seraing	46	(0)
2021–2024	Mechelen	24	(0)
2023–2024	→ Patro Eisden (loan)	15	(0)
2024–2025	Jong KVM	19	(0)
2025–	Thes Sport	24	(2)

International career
2011	Belgium U15	1	(0)
2013–2014	Belgium U18	4	(1)
2014–2015	Belgium U19	4	(0)
- * Club domestic league appearances and goals as of 3 May 2026

Iebe Swers (born 27 December 1996) is a Belgian professional footballer who plays as a right back for Thes Sport. He represented Belgium at youth international level.

== Club career ==
On 28 May 2021, he signed a four-year contract with Mechelen. On 20 June 2023, Swers was loaned by Patro Eisden, with an option to buy.
