= Jannes Van Hecke =

Belgian footballer

Personal information
- Date of birth: 15 January 2002 (age 24)
- Place of birth: Maldegem, Belgium
- Height: 1.75 m (5 ft 9 in)
- Position: Midfielder

Team information
- Current team: NAC Breda
- Number: 78

Youth career
- –2015: Club Brugge
- 2015–2018: Zulte Waregem

Senior career*
Years	Team	Apps	(Gls)
2019–2021	Zulte Waregem	16	(0)
2021–2024	Mechelen	60	(0)
2024–2026	Beveren	48	(7)
2026–	NAC Breda	1	(0)

International career^{‡}
2018–2019	Belgium U17	7	(0)
2019	Belgium U18	2	(0)
- * Club domestic league appearances and goals as of 14 August 2026 ‡ National team caps and goals as of 16 November 2019

Jannes Van Hecke (born 15 January 2002) is a Belgian footballer who plays for Dutch Eerste Divisie club NAC Breda.

== Club career ==
On 20 April 2021, he signed a three-year contract with Mechelen.

In October 2024, Van Hecke joined Belgian Pro League club Beveren on a contract until the end of the season with the option for a further year.
