= Maxime Wenssens =

Belgian-Rwandan footballer (born 2004)

Personal information
- Full name: Maxime Kali Nathan Wenssens
- Date of birth: 17 November 2001 (age 24)
- Place of birth: Uccle, Belgium
- Height: 1.91 m (6 ft 3 in)
- Position: Goalkeeper

Team information
- Current team: Thes Sport
- Number: 34

Youth career
- Sint-Truiden

Senior career*
Years	Team	Apps	(Gls)
2018–2020	Sint-Truiden	0	(0)
2020–2022	Mechelen	0	(0)
2023–2024	Union SG B	8	(0)
2023–2024	Union SG	0	(0)
2025–	Thes Sport	0	(0)

International career^{‡}
2024–	Rwanda	1	(0)
- * Club domestic league appearances and goals as of 3 May 2026 ‡ National team caps and goals as of 20:35, 17 September 2024 (UTC)

Maxime Kali Nathan Wenssens (born 17 November 2001) is a professional footballer who plays as a goalkeeper for Thes Sport. Born in Belgium, he plays for the Rwanda national team.

== Career ==
On 13 March 2018, he signed his first professional contract with Sint-Truidense V.V. for 2.5 season. On 19 November 2020, he transferred to K.V. Mechelen where he was the reserve goalkeeper. On 27 August 2023, he transferred to Union Saint-Gilloise on a 1+1 year contract to act as third goalkeeper. On 10 July 2024, Wenssens was released by Union Saint-Gilloise.

== International career ==
Wenssens was born in Belgium to a Belgian father and Rwandan mother. He was first called up to the Rwanda national team for a set of 2026 FIFA World Cup qualification matches. He debuted for Rwanda in a friendly 2–0 win over Madagascar on 25 March 2024.

== Honours ==
Union Saint-Gilloise

- Belgian Cup: 2023–24
