= 2025–26 Royal Antwerp FC season =

Royal Antwerp
2025–26 season
- Owner: Paul Gheysens
- Chairman: Paul Gheysens
- Manager: Stef Wils
- Stadium: Bosuilstadion
- Pro League: 7th
- Belgian Cup: TBD
- Top goalscorer: League: Vincent Janssen (2 goals); All: Vincent Janssen (2 goals)
- All statistics correct as of 25 June 2025.

The 2025–26 season is Royal Antwerp Football Club's 146th season in existence and ninth consecutive in the Belgian Pro League. They are also competing in the Belgian Cup.

== Players ==
=== First-team squad ===
As of 23 January 2026

Note: Flags indicate national team as defined under FIFA eligibility rules; some limited exceptions apply. Players may hold more than one non-FIFA nationality.

No.	Pos.	Nation	Player
2	DF	BEL	Kobe Corbanie
3	DF	BEL	Björn Engels
4	DF	JPN	Yuto Tsunashima
5	DF	BEL	Daam Foulon
6	MF	COD	Jules Ahoka
7	FW	SUR	Gyrano Kerk
8	MF	BEL	Dennis Praet
9	FW	KSA	Marwan Al-Sahafi (on loan from Al-Ittihad)
10	MF	NED	Isaac Babadi (on loan from PSV)
11	MF	BEL	Geoffry Hairemans
15	GK	BEL	Yannick Thoelen
16	MF	ARG	Mauricio Benítez (on loan from Boca Juniors)
17	DF	BEL	Semm Renders
18	FW	NED	Vincent Janssen
19	FW	UZB	Mukhammadali Urinboev
20	DF	BEL	Rein Van Helden
21	MF	BEL	Andreas Verstraeten
22	MF	CIV	Farouck Adekami

No.	Pos.	Nation	Player
23	DF	NED	Glenn Bijl
24	FW	BEL	Thibo Somers
25	DF	MLI	Boubakar Kouyaté
30	MF	GER	Christopher Scott
33	DF	BEL	Zeno Van Den Bosch
34	MF	FRA	Mahamadou Diawara (on loan from Olympique Lyon)
41	GK	JPN	Taishi Brandon Nozawa
43	MF	BEL	Youssef Hamdaoui
55	FW	ECU	Anthony Valencia
67	DF	CIV	Arouna Koné
76	FW	NGA	Orseer Achihi
78	MF	BEL	Xander Dierckx
79	FW	BEL	Gerard Vandeplas
81	GK	BEL	Niels Devalckeneer
92	FW	NGA	Gabriel Jesus David

== Transfers ==
=== In ===
Pos.	Player	Transferred from	Fee	Date	Source
DF	(Belgium) Rein Van Helden	(Belgium) STVV	€ 1,500,000	23 January 2026	
MF	(Democratic Republic of the Congo) Jules Ahoka	(Democratic Republic of the Congo) AC Normands	Undisclosed	8 September 2025	
MF	(France) Mahamadou Diawara	(France) Olympique Lyon	On loan	8 September 2025	
MF	(Netherlands) Isaac Babadi	(Netherlands) PSV	On loan	1 September 2025	
FW	(Saudi Arabia) Marwan Al-Sahafi	(Saudi Arabia) Al-Ittihad	On loan	21 August 2025	
DF	(Mali) Boubakar Kouyaté	(France) Montpellier HSC	Free	12 August 2025	
DF	(Japan) Yuto Tsunashima	(Japan) Tokyo Verdy	€ 800,000	6 August 2025	
DF	(Netherlands) Glenn Bijl	(Russia) KS Samara	Free	24 July 2025	
FW	(Belgium) Thibo Somers	(Belgium) Cercle Brugge	€ 1,500,000	18 July 2025	
FW	(Uzbekistan) Mukhammadali Urinboev	(Uzbekistan) Pakhtakor FC	€ 500,000	7 July 2025	
GK	(Japan) Taishi Brandon Nozawa	(Japan) FC Tokyo	€ 1,000,000	26 June 2025	
MF	(Argentina) Mauricio Benítez	(Argentina) Boca Juniors	On loan	1 July 2025	
MF	(Belgium) Geoffry Hairemans	(Belgium) K.V. Mechelen	Free	1 July 2025	
DF	(Belgium) Daam Foulon	(Belgium) K.V. Mechelen	Free	1 July 2025	

=== Out ===
Pos.	Player	Transferred to	Fee	Date	Source
DF	(Bulgaria) Rosen Bozhinov	(Italy) Pisa SC	€ 5,000,000	14 January 2026	
MF	(Mali) Mahamadou Doumbia	(Saudi Arabia) Al-Ittihad	€ 16,000,000	8 September 2025	
GK	(Belgium) Senne Lammens	(England) Manchester United	€ 21,000,000	1 September 2025	
FW	(Belgium) Michel-Ange Balikwisha	(Scotland) Celtic	€ 5,200,000	28 August 2025	
DF	(Belgium) Jelle Bataille	(Israel) Maccabi Haifa	Option not validated	3 July 2025	
MF	(Ghana) Denis Odoi	(Netherlands) NAC Breda	Mutual consent	24 June 2025	
MF	(Netherlands) Tjaronn Chery	(Netherlands) NEC Nijmegen	€ 500,000	15 June 2025	
MF	(Netherlands) Jaïro Riedewald	(England) Sheffield United	End of contract	30 June 2025	
MF	(Belgium) Milan Smits	(Netherlands) De Graafschap	End of contract	30 June 2025	
DF	(Belgium) Toby Alderweireld		End of career	30 June 2025	

== Pre-season and friendlies ==
28 June 2025 Friendly	Antwerp (Belgium)	0–1	(Belgium) Zulte Waregem	Antwerp, Belgium
			Traoré	Stadium: Bosuilstadion; Attendance: 0

3 July 2025 Friendly	Antwerp (Belgium)	1–2	(Belgium) Beveren	Antwerp, Belgium
	Gabriel Jesus		Brüls; Servais	Stadium: Bosuilstadion; Attendance: 0

11 July 2025 Friendly	Antwerp (Belgium)	2–1	(Denmark) FC Nordsjælland	Wörgl, Austria
12:30 CEST (UTC+2)	Janssen (pen.); Doumbia		Goal	Stadium: Sportzentrum Wörgl; Attendance: 0

11 July 2025 Friendly	Antwerp (Belgium)	0–0	(Denmark) FC Nordsjælland	Wörgl, Austria
14:30 CEST (UTC+2)				Stadium: Sportzentrum Wörgl; Attendance: 0

19 July 2025 Friendly	Antwerp (Belgium)	2–0	(Netherlands) Willem II Tilburg	Antwerp, Belgium
18:30 CEST (UTC+2)	Kerk 52'; Balikwisha 72'			Stadium: Bosuilstadion; Attendance: 5,000

20 July 2025 Friendly	Antwerp (Belgium)	2–0	(Belgium) Eupen	Antwerp, Belgium
	Gabriel Jesus; Achichi			Stadium: Bosuilstadion; Attendance: 0

== Competitions ==
=== Overall record ===
Competition	First match	Last match	Starting round	Record							
Competition	First match	Last match	Starting round	Pld	W	D	L	GF	GA	GD	Win %
Belgian Pro League	25 July 2025	22 March 2026	Matchday 1	30	9	8	13	31	32	−1	30.00
Europe Play-offs	3 April 2026	23 May 2026	Matchday 1	10	4	1	5	12	16	−4	40.00
Belgian Cup	29 October 2025	12 February 2026	Seventh round	5	3	1	1	9	9	+0	60.00
Total				45	16	10	19	52	57	−5	35.56

Source: Competitions

=== Belgian Pro League ===
==== League table ====
Pos	Team	Pld	W	D	L	GF	GA	GD	Pts	Qualification or relegation
8	Standard Liège	30	11	7	12	27	35	−8	40	Qualification for the Europe play-offs
9	Westerlo	30	10	9	11	36	40	−4	39	Qualification for the Europe play-offs
10	Antwerp	30	9	8	13	31	32	−1	35	Qualification for the Europe play-offs
11	Charleroi	30	9	7	14	38	42	−4	34	Qualification for the Europe play-offs
12	OH Leuven	30	9	7	14	32	43	−11	34	Qualification for the Europe play-offs

Source: Jupiler Pro League (in Dutch)
Rules for classification: 1) Points; 2) Matches won; 3) Goal difference; 4) Goals scored; 5) Away matches won; 6) Away goal difference; 7) Away goals scored; 8) Play-off.

==== Results summary ====
Overall								Home						Away					
Pld	W	D	L	GF	GA	GD	Pts	W	D	L	GF	GA	GD	W	D	L	GF	GA	GD
30	9	8	13	31	32	−1	35	6	4	5	21	18	+3	3	4	8	10	14	−4

==== Results by round ====
Round	1	2	3	4	5	6	7	8	9	10	11	12	13	14	15	16	17	18	19	20	21	22	23	24	25	26	27	28	29	30
Ground	H	A	H	A	H	A	H	A	A	H	A	H	A	H	H	A	H	A	H	H	A	H	A	A	H	A	H	A	H	A
Result	D	D	W	D	W	L	L	D	L	D	L	L	L	W	L	W	W	W	D	W	L	L	W	L	L	L	W	D	D	L
Position	9	10	7	7	5	6	8	12	13	13	14	14	15	14	14	12	10	8	8	7	8	9	9	10	11	11	10	10	10	10

A = Away; H = Home; W = Win; D = Draw; L = Loss

==== Matches ====
The league fixtures were announced on 20 June 2025.

25 July 2025 1	Antwerp	1–1	Union SG	Antwerp
20:45 CEST (UTC+2)	Janssen (yellow card) 21', (goal) 36'; Doumbia (yellow card) 26'; Kerk (yellow card) 77'		Niang (yellow card) 45+2'; Leysen (yellow card) 57'; Vanhoutte (yellow card) 67'; Florucz 68'	Stadium: Bosuilstadion; Attendance: 12,398; Referee: Erik Lambrechts

3 August 2025 2	Genk	1–1	Antwerp	Genk
13:30 CEST (UTC+2)	El Ouahdi 28'		Janssen 24'; Somers (yellow card) 71'; Praet (yellow card) 89'	Stadium: Cegeka Arena; Attendance: 18,030; Referee: Lawrence Visser

10 August 2025 3	Antwerp	3–1	OH Leuven	Antwerp
19:15 CEST (UTC+2)	Balikwisha 36' (pen.); Kerk (yellow card) 48'; Doumbia 78' (pen.); Van Den Bosch (yellow card) 90+6'; Adekami 90+7', (yellow card) 90+8'		Traoré (yellow card) 32'; Pletinckx (yellow card) 40', (goal) 87'; Verstraete (yellow card) 45+2' (yellow-red card) 83'; Vlietinck (yellow card) 90+6'	Stadium: Bosuilstadion; Attendance: 12,000; Referee: Wesli De Cremer

17 August 2025 4	Charleroi	1–1	Antwerp	Charleroi
18:30 CEST (UTC+2)	Guiagon 34'; Bernier (yellow card) 47'; Nzita (yellow card) 82'; Colassin (yellow card) 90+4'		Adekami 13', (yellow card) 59'; Van Den Bosch (yellow card) 74'; David (yellow card) 90+5'	Stadium: Stade du Pays de Charleroi; Attendance: 6,600; Referee: Simon Bourdeaud'hui

24 August 2025 5	Antwerp	2–1	K.V. Mechelen	Antwerp
13:30 CEST (UTC+2)	Somers 27'; Praet (red card) 54'; Doumbia 80'		Koudou 11', (yellow card) 87'; Lauberbach (yellow card) 31'; Hammar (yellow card) 87'	Stadium: Bosuilstadion; Attendance: 12,818; Referee: Bram Van Driessche

30 August 2025 6	Westerlo	2–0	Antwerp	Westerlo
18:15 CEST (UTC+2)	Sakamoto 28'; Alcócer (yellow card) 66'; Ferri (yellow card) 73'; Piedfort 75'		Doumbia (yellow card) 18'; Verstraeten (yellow card) 60'; Kerk (yellow card) 89'	Stadium: Het Kuipje; Attendance: 5,500; Referee: Jan Boterberg

14 September 2025 7	Antwerp	1–2	Gent	Antwerp
13:30 CEST (UTC+2)	Tsunashima (yellow card) 17'; Foulon (yellow card) 29'; Bozhinov 36'; Hamdaoui (yellow card) 74'; Al-Sahafi (yellow card) 88'		Kotto (red card) 14'; Van der Heyden (yellow card) 31'; Skóraś 45+2'; Samoise 47'; Duverne (yellow card) 53'	Stadium: Bosuilstadion; Attendance: 13,650; Referee: Lawrence Visser

20 September 2025 8	Anderlecht	0–0	Antwerp	Anderlecht
20:45 CEST (UTC+2)	Huerta (yellow card) 52'; Vázquez (yellow card) 59'; Saliba (yellow card) 90'		Al-Sahafi (yellow card) 49'; Kouyaté (yellow card) 90'	Stadium: Lotto Park; Attendance: 22,500; Referee: Erik Lambrechts

27 September 2025 9	Zulte Waregem	2–0	Antwerp	Waregem
16:00 CEST (UTC+2)	Erenbjerg 56'; Aké 84'		Tsunashima (yellow card) 18'	Stadium: Elindus Arena; Attendance: 6,947; Referee: Bert Verbeke

4 October 2025 10	Antwerp	1–1	Cercle Brugge	Antwerp
20:45 CEST (UTC+2)	Adekami (yellow card) 24'; Benítez 28'		Agyekum (yellow card) 12'; Diakité 41'	Stadium: Bosuilstadion; Attendance: 11,495; Referee: Nathan Verboomen

17 October 2025 11	Standard Liège	1–0	Antwerp	Liège
20:45 CEST (UTC+2)	Saïd 1', (yellow card) 72'; Abid (red card) 39'; Hautekiet (yellow card) 55'		Scott (yellow card) 41'; Babadi (yellow card) 63'; Van Den Bosch (yellow card) 86'	Stadium: Stade Maurice Dufrasne; Attendance: 17,000; Referee: Lothar D'Hondt
Note: The match got suspended at a 1-0 score, because of cups being thrown on the pitch and to the referee multiple times by the homefans. The match will be finished on 20 October behind closed doors.

26 October 2025 12	Antwerp	0–1	Club Brugge	Antwerp
13:30 CET (UTC+1)	Benítez (yellow card) 27'; Somers (yellow card) 72'		Vermant 12'; Jackers (yellow card) 90+5'	Stadium: Bosuilstadion; Attendance: 14,036; Referee: Nicolas Laforge

2 November 2025 13	STVV	1–0	Antwerp	Sint-Truiden
18:30 CET (UTC+1)	Muja (yellow card) 13'; Ito 16'; Goto (yellow card) 71'; Kokubo (yellow card) 84'		Diawara (yellow card) 17'; Foulon (red card) 22'; Benítez (yellow card) 70'	Stadium: Stayen; Attendance: 6,489; Referee: Nathan Verboomen

8 November 2025 14	Antwerp	3–1	La Louvière	Antwerp
20:45 CET (UTC+1)	Kouyaté (yellow card) 6'; Janssen 59' (pen.); Adekami (yellow card) 62'; Al-Sahafi 63'; Scott 72'; Bozhinov (yellow card) 85'; Van Den Bosch (yellow card) 90+2'		Benavides (yellow card) 23'; Okou (yellow card) 42'; Maës (red card) 45'; Gueulette (yellow card) 69'; Beka 86'	Stadium: Bosuilstadion; Attendance: 11,328; Referee: Bram Van Driessche

23 November 2025 15	Antwerp	1–2	Dender EH	Antwerp
16:00 CET (UTC+1)	Praet (yellow card) 36'; Kouyaté 76'		Květ (yellow card) 45'; Toshevski 50'; Mbamba (yellow card) 57'; Jahanbakhsh (yellow card) 61'; Sambu (yellow card) 61'; Oratmangoen 88'	Stadium: Bosuilstadion; Attendance: 11,352; Referee: Wesli De Cremer

30 November 2025 16	Club Brugge	0–1	Antwerp	Bruges
13:30 CET (UTC+1)			Benítez (yellow card) 68', (goal) 88'; Kouyaté (yellow card) 90+3'; Nozawa (yellow card) 90+7'	Stadium: Jan Breydel Stadium; Attendance: 29,042; Referee: Lothar D'Hondt

7 December 2025 17	Antwerp	3–0	Genk	Antwerp
18:30 CET (UTC+1)	Somers 8'; Benítez 14'; Kouyaté (yellow card) 17'; Janssen 56'		Heynen (yellow card) 71'	Stadium: Bosuilstadion; Attendance: 21,000; Referee: Jasper Vergoote

14 December 2025 18	Gent	0–2	Antwerp	Ghent
13:30 CET (UTC+1)	Skóraś (red card) 90+1'		Kerk 30'; Janssen (yellow card) 74'; Valencia 83'	Stadium: Planet Group Arena; Attendance: 14,747; Referee: Nicolas Laforge

21 December 2025 19	Antwerp	2–2	Anderlecht	Antwerp
18:30 CET (UTC+1)	Janssen 16' (pen.); Somers 19'		Llansana (yellow card) 15'; Hazard 49' (pen.); Bertaccini (yellow card) 52'; Degreef 87'; Maamar (yellow card) 90+1'	Stadium: Bosuilstadion; Attendance: 20,495; Referee: Erik Lambrechts

27 December 2025 20	Antwerp	2–1	Zulte Waregem	Antwerp
13:30 CET (UTC+1)	Janssen 43', (yellow card) 90+4'; Kerk 60'; Benítez (yellow card) 71'; Dierckx (yellow card) 82'		Erenbjerg 28'	Stadium: Bosuilstadion; Attendance: 18,567; Referee: Bert Verbeke

18 January 2026 21	Dender EH	1–0	Antwerp	Denderleeuw
16:00 CET (UTC+1)	Květ 32', (yellow card) 56'; Moutha-Sebtaoui (yellow card) 90+7'			Stadium: Dender Football Complex; Attendance: 2,512; Referee: Michiel Allaerts

25 January 2026 22	Antwerp	0–2	Charleroi	Antwerp
13:30 CET (UTC+1)	Somers (yellow card) 37'; Janssen (yellow card) 73'		Scheidler 9'; Camara (yellow card) 45+1'; Titraoui (yellow card) 51'; Guiagon 57' (pen.)	Stadium: Bosuilstadion; Attendance: 16,783; Referee: Jan Boterberg

31 January 2026 23	Cercle Brugge	0–4	Antwerp	Bruges
16:00 CET (UTC+1)	Warleson (red card) 10'; Nazinho (yellow card) 88'		Scott 43'; Janssen 45+6' (pen.); Verstraeten (yellow card) 47'; Tsunashima 49'; Somers 59'	Stadium: Jan Breydel Stadium; Attendance: 5,450; Referee: Simon Bourdeaud'hui

8 February 2026 24	KV Mechelen	2–0	Antwerp	Mechelen
19:15 CET (UTC+1)	Van Brederode 11'; Vanrafelghem 65'; Decoene (yellow card) 71'		Verstraeten (yellow card) 62'	Stadium: Achter de Kazerne; Attendance: 14,003; Referee: Lothar D'Hondt

15 February 2026 25	Antwerp	0–2	Westerlo	Antwerp
16:00 CET (UTC+1)	Tsunashima (yellow card) 21'; Valencia (yellow card) 88'		Sayyadmanesh 16'; Reynolds (yellow card) 22', (goal) 64'; Alcócer (yellow card) 74'; Nsiala (yellow card) 78'; Neustädter (yellow card) 89'	Stadium: Bosuilstadion; Attendance: 11,830; Referee: Bert Verbeke

21 February 2026 26	Union SG	2–1	Antwerp	Saint-Gilles
20:45 CET (UTC+1)	Van Den Bosch 44' (o.g.); Chambaere (yellow card) 69'; Sykes 90+1'; Mac Allister (yellow card) 90+8'		Kouyaté (yellow card) 7'; Valencia 51'	Stadium: Joseph Marien Stadium; Attendance: 6,344; Referee: Bram Van Driessche

28 February 2026 27	Antwerp	1–0	STVV	Antwerp
18:15 CET (UTC+1)	Janssen (yellow card) 26'; Van Den Bosch (yellow card) 45'; Valencia 51'		Muja (yellow card) 3'	Stadium: Bosuilstadion; Attendance: 13,272; Referee: Wesli De Cremer

6 March 2026 28	La Louvière	0–0	Antwerp	La Louvière
20:45 CET (UTC+1)	Maisonneuve (yellow card) 59'		Scott (yellow card) 65'; Dierckx (yellow card) 81' (yellow-red card) 88'	Stadium: Easi Arena; Attendance: 4,978; Referee: Jasper Vergoote

15 March 2026 29	Antwerp	1–1	Standard Liège	Antwerp
16:00 CET (UTC+1)	Foulon (yellow card) 68' (yellow-red card) 71'; Valencia 79'		Karamoko (yellow card) 45+5'; Nielsen (yellow card) 50'; Henry (yellow card) 89'; Mohr 90'	Stadium: Bosuilstadion; Attendance: 16,549; Referee: Nathan Verboomen

22 March 2026 30	OH Leuven	1–0	Antwerp	Leuven
18:30 CET (UTC+1)	Dussenne (yellow card) 5'; Maziz (yellow card) 84'; Kaba 90', (yellow card) 90+2'		Tsunashima (yellow card) 28'; Van Den Bosch (yellow card) 39' (yellow-red card) 50'; Janssen (yellow card) 50'; Bijl (yellow card) 82'	Stadium: Den Dreef; Attendance: 7,204; Referee: Nicolas Laforge

==== Europe Play-Off ====
Pos	Team	Pld	W	D	L	GF	GA	GD	Pts	Qualification or relegation	GNK	STA	CHA	WES	ANT	OHL
1	Genk	10	4	5	1	11	6	+5	38	Qualification for the European competition play-off	—	1–1	1–1	3–0	0–0	0–0
2	Standard Liège	10	5	2	3	17	11	+6	37		0–0	—	0–2	1–2	1–2	2–1
3	Charleroi	10	5	2	3	12	8	+4	34		2–0	1–2	—	0–1	2–1	1–1
4	Westerlo	10	4	1	5	14	17	−3	33		1–2	1–2	2–0	—	2–4	3–3
5	Antwerp	10	4	1	5	12	16	−4	31		1–2	0–5	0–1	2–0	—	2–0
6	OH Leuven	10	1	3	6	9	17	−8	23		0–2	1–3	0–2	0–2	3–0	—

Source: Jupiler Pro League (in Dutch), Soccerway
Rules for classification: 1) Points; 2) Points without (possible) half points added due to rounding; 3) Regular season finishing position.

==== Results summary ====
Overall								Home						Away					
Pld	W	D	L	GF	GA	GD	Pts	W	D	L	GF	GA	GD	W	D	L	GF	GA	GD
10	4	1	5	12	16	−4	13	2	0	3	5	8	−3	2	1	2	7	8	−1

Source: Jupiler Pro League

==== Results by round ====
Round	1	2	3	4	5	6	7	8	9	10
Ground	H	A	H	A	A	H	H	A	A	H
Result	L	L	W	W	W	L	L	L	D	W
Position	4	6	4	4	4	5	5	5	5	5

Source: Jupiler Pro League
A = Away; H = Home; W = Win; D = Draw; L = Loss

==== Matches ====
3 April 2026 1	Antwerp	1–2	Genk	Antwerp
20:45 CEST (UTC+2)	Scott 86'; Hamdaoui (yellow card) 90'; Valencia (yellow card) 90+5'		Bangoura (yellow card) 20'; Heymans 45+2', 51' (pen.); Smets (yellow card) 66'	Stadium: Bosuilstadion; Attendance: 12,606; Referee: Lothar D'Hondt

10 April 2026 2	Charleroi	2–1	Antwerp	Charleroi
20:45 CEST (UTC+2)	Bernier 30', (yellow card) 69'; Boukamir (yellow card) 43'; Pflücke 63'; Ousou (yellow card) 70'		Adekami (yellow card) 54'; Valencia (yellow card) 89'; Janssen 90+4' (pen.)	Stadium: Stade du Pays de Charleroi; Attendance: 4,633; Referee: Jan Boterberg

18 April 2026 3	Antwerp	2–0	OH Leuven	Antwerp
16:00 CEST (UTC+2)	Dierckx 51', (yellow card) 78'; Hamdaoui 89'; Janssen (yellow card) 90+5'		Gil (yellow card) 24' (yellow-red card) 28'; Verstraete (yellow card) 61' (red card) 73'; Ikwuemesi (yellow card) 85'	Stadium: Bosuilstadion; Attendance: 9,437; Referee: Bert Put

21 April 2026 4	Standard Liège	1–2	Antwerp	Liège
20:30 CEST (UTC+2)	Nielsen 78' (pen.); Lawrence (yellow card) 80'		Scott 47', 66'; Kerk (yellow card) 71'; Adekami (yellow card) 80'	Stadium: Stade Maurice Dufrasne; Attendance: 8,229; Referee: Nathan Verboomen

25 April 2026 5	Westerlo	2–4	Antwerp	Westerlo
20:45 CEST (UTC+2)	Bayram (red card) 10'; Alcócer (yellow card) 32'; Piedfort (yellow card) 38'; Sakamoto 58'; Sayyadmanesh (yellow card) 64'; Saito 87'; Neustädter (yellow card) 90+3'		Janssen 25', 28'; Scott (yellow card) 38', (goal) 44'; Foulon (yellow card) 40'; Kerk 60'; Hamdaoui (yellow card) 90+3'	Stadium: Het Kuipje; Attendance: 6,487; Referee: Nicolas Laforge

3 May 2026 6	Antwerp	0–5	Standard Liège	Antwerp
16:00 CEST (UTC+2)	Van Den Bosch (yellow card) 59'; Kouyaté (yellow card) 72' (yellow-red card) 90'		Tsunashima 33' (o.g.); Nkada 38'; Bates 42'; Saïd 48', 62'	Stadium: Bosuilstadion; Attendance: 13,329; Referee: Jasper Vergoote

10 May 2026 7	Antwerp	0–1	Charleroi	Antwerp
16:00 CEST (UTC+2)	Praet (yellow card) 39'; Janssen (yellow card) 67'		Titraoui 41'; Blum (yellow card) 57'; Romsaas (yellow card) 81'; Koné (yellow card) 90'	Stadium: Bosuilstadion; Attendance: 11,457; Referee: Bert Verbeke

15 May 2026 8	OH Leuven	3–0	Antwerp	Leuven
20:45 CEST (UTC+2)	Teklab (yellow card) 29', (goal) 53'; Traoré 34'; Schrijvers 43'		Foulon (yellow card) 25'	Stadium: Den Dreef; Attendance: 4,773; Referee: Anthony Letellier

19 May 2026 9	Genk	0–0	Antwerp	Genk
20:30 CEST (UTC+2)			Tsunashima (yellow card) 75'; Tuypens (yellow card) 78'	Stadium: Cegeka Arena; Attendance: 12,981; Referee: Bram Van Driessche

23 May 2026 10	Antwerp	2–0	Westerlo	Antwerp
20:45 CEST (UTC+2)	Tsunashima (yellow card) 11'; Adekami (yellow card) 24'; Van Helden 45+2'; Foulon (yellow card) 65'; Fofana 69'		Van den Keybus (yellow card) 2'; Bayram (yellow card) 36'	Stadium: Bosuilstadion; Attendance: 10,739; Referee: Massimiliano Ledda

=== Belgian Cup ===
29 October 2025 Seventh round	Antwerp	3–1	Eupen	Antwerp
20:30 CET (UTC+1)	Janssen 3', 20'; Hamdaoui 31'; Kouyaté (yellow card) 63'; Scott (yellow card) 68'		Müller (yellow card) 53'; Busquets 70'	Stadium: Bosuilstadion; Attendance: 8,838; Referee: Matonga Simonini

3 December 2025 Eighth round	Antwerp	3–3 (a.e.t.) (4–3 p)	STVV	Antwerp
20:30 CET (UTC+1)	Kerk 15', 61'; Scott 21'; Kouyaté (yellow card) 48'; Bozhinov (yellow card) 83'		Goto 17', 68', (yellow card) 59'; Vanwesemael 45+4'; Yamamoto (yellow card) 88'; Musliu (yellow card) 107'; Van Helden (yellow card) 119'	Stadium: Bosuilstadion; Attendance: 9,021; Referee: Erik Lambrechts
	Penalties
	Janssen (penalty scored); Corbanie (penalty scored); Babadi (penalty scored); Van Den Bosch (penalty scored)		Merlen (penalty missed); Ferrari (penalty scored); Musliu (penalty scored); Janssens (penalty scored); Sebaoui (penalty missed)

13 January 2026 Quarter-finals	Antwerp	2–1 (a.e.t.)	La Louvière	Antwerp
20:30 CET (UTC+1)	Kerk 12', 116'; Kouyaté (yellow card) 65'; Janssen (yellow card) 75'; Benítez (yellow card) 99'		Lamego (yellow card) 33'; Fall 45+1'; Afriyie (yellow card) 47'; Benavides (yellow card) 75'	Stadium: Bosuilstadion; Attendance: 12,865; Referee: Nathan Verboomen

5 February 2026 Semi-final 1st leg	Anderlecht	0–1	Antwerp	Anderlecht
20:30 CET (UTC+1)	Sardella (yellow card) 38' (yellow-red card) 74'; Diarra (red card) 79'		Verstraeten (yellow card) 6'; Janssen 45+1'; Scott (yellow card) 65'; Nozawa (yellow card) 90+2'	Stadium: Lotto Park; Attendance: 16,000; Referee: Lawrence Visser

12 February 2026 Semi-final 2nd leg	Antwerp	0–4 (1–4 agg.)	Anderlecht	Antwerp
20:30 CET (UTC+1)	Kerk (yellow card) 5'; Scott (yellow card) 34'; Tsunashima (red card) 90'; Van Den Bosch (yellow card) 90+3'; Janssen (yellow card) 90+7'		Saliba 1'; Degreef 45+2'; De Cat 47'; Scott 84' (o.g.); Augustinsson (yellow card) 90+5'; Llansana (yellow card) 90+7'	Stadium: Bosuilstadion; Attendance: 20,780; Referee: Nathan Verboomen

=== Goalscorers ===
Rank	No.	Pos	Nat	Name	Belgian Pro League	Belgian Cup	Total
1	18	FW	(Netherlands)	Vincent Janssen	10	3	13
2	7	FW	(Suriname)	Gyrano Kerk	3	4	7
2	30	MF	(Germany)	Christopher Scott	6	1	7
4	14	FW	(Ecuador)	Anthony Valencia	4	0	4
4	24	FW	(Belgium)	Thibo Somers	4	0	4
6	16	MF	(Argentina)	Mauricio Benítez	3	0	3
7	20	MF	(Mali)	Mahamadou Doumbia	2	0	2
7	22	MF	(Ivory Coast)	Farouck Adekami	2	0	2
7	43	MF	(Belgium)	Youssef Hamdaoui	1	1	2
10	4	DF	(Japan)	Yuto Tsunashima	1	0	1
10	9	FW	(Saudi Arabia)	Marwan Al-Sahafi	1	0	1
10	10	FW	(Belgium)	Michel-Ange Balikwisha	1	0	1
10	20	DF	(Belgium)	Rein Van Helden	1	0	1
10	25	DF	(Mali)	Boubakar Kouyaté	1	0	1
10	26	DF	(Bulgaria)	Rosen Bozhinov	1	0	1
10	58	MF	(Ivory Coast)	Modibo Fofana	1	0	1
10	78	MF	(Belgium)	Xander Dierckx	1	0	1
Totals					43	8	51
