= 2002–03 Manchester United F.C. season =

English football club season

Manchester United
2002–03 season
- Chairman: Martin Edwards
- Manager: Sir Alex Ferguson
- Premier League: 1st
- FA Cup: Fifth round
- League Cup: Runners-up
- UEFA Champions League: Quarter-finals
- Top goalscorer: League: Ruud van Nistelrooy (25); All: Ruud van Nistelrooy (44)
- Highest home attendance: 67,721 vs Charlton Athletic (3 May 2003)
- Lowest home attendance: 47,848 vs Leicester City (5 November 2002)
- Average home league attendance: 67,602
Home colours	Away colours	Third colours

The 2002–03 season was Manchester United's 11th season in the Premier League, and their 28th consecutive season in the top division of English football. This season saw the club regain the Premier League title, just one year after coming third, their lowest finish in the history of the Premier League. United also reached the final of the League Cup, losing 2–0 to Liverpool, and were knocked out of the FA Cup in the fifth round by eventual winners Arsenal, who had held an eight-point lead at the top of the league table in March. United also reached the quarter-finals of the UEFA Champions League, losing 6–5 on aggregate to title holders Real Madrid.

The club broke the English transfer record for the third time in just over a year as they paid £29.1 million for Leeds United defender Rio Ferdinand. At the end of the season, United midfielder David Beckham moved to Real Madrid in a £25 million deal, having spent 12 years at United (eight of them as a first-team regular). Meanwhile, 37-year-old centre-back Laurent Blanc announced his retirement from playing, and fellow defender David May was given a free transfer after nine years at the club, the last five of which had seen his first team opportunities limited to a handful of appearances.

== Season review ==
After ending the previous season by surrendering the title to Arsenal at home and finishing third behind rejuvenated Liverpool, Alex Ferguson reiterated his desire to dominate English football by signing a three-year contract in the late winter of 2002. By the end of the season, Ferguson got his wish and bagged Manchester United their fifteenth domestic league title, thanks largely to the form of striker Ruud van Nistelrooy who scored an impressive 25 goals during the run-in. The manager also assembled a new defence which included new signing Rio Ferdinand, whose deal broke the transfer record in English football and indeed, the world record for a defender.

The Red Devils started their quest to regain the Premier League title at home to newly promoted West Bromwich Albion and claimed all three points thanks to super-sub Ole Gunnar Solskjær's late goal. Results didn't flow as Ferguson hoped and as early autumn approached, Manchester United had made their worst start since the inauguration of the Premier League, lying in 10th place. Things didn't get better as losses to Bolton Wanderers and Leeds United were eclipsed by a derby day defeat to Manchester City in November which allowed a four-point gap to open between themselves and leaders Liverpool. Following an emphatic 5–3 win against Newcastle United, the team embarked on a run of wins that included rivals Liverpool, struggling West Ham and champions Arsenal to help their Premier League challenge gather ominous momentum. Although they slumped to defeat on Boxing Day at Middlesbrough, the team were in third place, five points short of table-toppers Arsenal at the turn of the year.

The defeat to Middlesbrough turned out to be their last league defeat of the season, as a series of late home wins against Sunderland and Chelsea in January helped pile the pressure somewhat on runaway leaders Arsenal, who were struggling with a minor goalkeeping crisis. After United drew at Bolton in the late evening kick-off on 22 February, Arsenal had the chance to open a five-point gap at the Premier League summit if they won at Maine Road. A five-star performance ensured this through a rampant display of attacking football that virtually put one hand on the trophy. However the difference in the title race was later whittled down to two after Blackburn completed a sensational double over the reigning champions at home while United recorded a victory over Aston Villa thanks to a David Beckham goal.

April began with a 4–0 win over Liverpool at Old Trafford, which helped them reclaim top spot albeit temporarily. However, Kolo Touré's late own goal gifted Aston Villa a point when Arsenal perhaps should have taken all three. By the end of the week, just goal difference separated the top two, favouring the Gunners. A 6–2 rout at Newcastle preceded the game of the season: against Arsenal at Highbury. A 2–2 draw did not prove to be decisive, but it was advantage Manchester United, who maintained a three-point lead, although the Gunners had a game in hand and a slightly superior goal difference. Despite more European disappointment – this time at the hands of Real Madrid through an impressive performance by Ronaldo – a comeback by Bolton Wanderers dented Arsenal's hopes of retaining the double and installed Manchester United as sole favourites to win the league. They cruised to a 4–1 home win against Charlton Athletic and clinched their eighth title in eleven seasons after Arsenal lost at home to Leeds a day later.

Manchester United wrapped up their successful league campaign with a 2–1 victory at Everton, David Beckham scored United's leveller in what was his last appearance for the club.

== Pre-season and friendlies ==
Date	Opponents	H/A	Result F–A	Scorers	Attendance
20 July 2002	Shelbourne	A	5–0	Van Nistelrooy (3) 17', 20', 63', Forlán 22', Yorke 60'	10,000
27 July 2002	Chesterfield	A	5–0	Blanc 19', Van Nistelrooy 54', Forlán 80', Keane 83', Richardson 86'	6,583
27 July 2002	Bournemouth	A	3–2	Verón 33', Muirhead 61', Stewart 66'	8,104
30 July 2002	Vålerenga	A	2–1	Solskjær 26' (pen.), Keane 84'	25,572
2 August 2002	Ajax	A	1–2	Scholes 78'	48,000
4 August 2002	Parma	N	3–0	Giggs 23', Verón 50', Solskjær 55'	48,000
6 August 2002	Aarhus XI	A	5–0	Van Nistelrooy (2) 44', 80', Solskjær 71', Giggs 81', Forlán 87'	20,500
10 August 2002	Boca Juniors	H	2–0	Van Nistelrooy (2) 23', 40'	56,724

== Premier League ==
Manchester United started their attempts to regain the Premier League title with a home match against newly promoted West Bromwich Albion. Although the fans were confident of taking maximum points they had to wait until the 78th minute for Ole Gunnar Solskjær, the late-goal specialist, to give them the lead with his 100th goal for the club. They could not add to their one-goal advantage, despite West Brom having to play with ten men with Derek McInnes being sent off for two bookings, the second for a foul on Nicky Butt in the 64th minute, but held on to begin the season with victory.

Date	Opponents	H/A	Result F–A	Scorers	Attendance	League position
17 August 2002	West Bromwich Albion	H	1–0	Solskjær 78'	67,645	7th
23 August 2002	Chelsea	A	2–2	Beckham 26', Giggs 66'	41,541	7th
31 August 2002	Sunderland	A	1–1	Giggs 7'	47,586	8th
3 September 2002	Middlesbrough	H	1–0	Van Nistelrooy 28' (pen.)	67,464	4th
11 September 2002	Bolton Wanderers	H	0–1		67,623	7th
14 September 2002	Leeds United	A	0–1		39,622	10th
21 September 2002	Tottenham Hotspur	H	1–0	Van Nistelrooy 62' (pen.)	67,611	8th
28 September 2002	Charlton Athletic	A	3–1	Scholes 54', Giggs 82', Van Nistelrooy 90'	26,630	4th
7 October 2002	Everton	H	3–0	Scholes (2) 86', 90', Van Nistelrooy 90' (pen.)	67,629	4th
19 October 2002	Fulham	A	1–1	Solskjær 62'	18,103	4th
26 October 2002	Aston Villa	H	1–1	Forlán 77'	67,619	4th
2 November 2002	Southampton	H	2–1	P. Neville 15', Forlán 85'	67,691	3rd
9 November 2002	Manchester City	A	1–3	Solskjær 7'	34,649	5th
17 November 2002	West Ham United	A	1–1	Van Nistelrooy 38'	35,049	5th
23 November 2002	Newcastle United	H	5–3	Scholes 25', Van Nistelrooy (3) 38', 45', 53', Solskjær 55'	67,625	5th
1 December 2002	Liverpool	A	2–1	Forlán (2) 63', 66'	44,250	4th
7 December 2002	Arsenal	H	2–0	Verón 20', Scholes 72'	67,650	3rd
14 December 2002	West Ham United	H	3–0	Solskjær 15', Verón 17', Schemmel 61' (o.g.)	67,555	2nd
22 December 2002	Blackburn Rovers	A	0–1		30,475	3rd
26 December 2002	Middlesbrough	A	1–3	Giggs 60'	34,673	3rd
28 December 2002	Birmingham City	H	2–0	Forlán 37', Beckham 73'	67,640	3rd
1 January 2003	Sunderland	H	2–1	Beckham 81', Scholes 90'	67,609	2nd
11 January 2003	West Bromwich Albion	A	3–1	Van Nistelrooy 8', Scholes 22', Solskjær 55'	27,129	2nd
18 January 2003	Chelsea	H	2–1	Scholes 39', Forlán 90'	67,606	2nd
1 February 2003	Southampton	A	2–0	Van Nistelrooy 15', Giggs 22'	32,085	2nd
4 February 2003	Birmingham City	A	1–0	Van Nistelrooy 56'	29,475	2nd
9 February 2003	Manchester City	H	1–1	Van Nistelrooy 18'	67,646	2nd
22 February 2003	Bolton Wanderers	A	1–1	Solskjær 90'	27,409	2nd
5 March 2003	Leeds United	H	2–1	Radebe 20' (o.g.), Silvestre 79'	67,135	2nd
15 March 2003	Aston Villa	A	1–0	Beckham 12'	42,602	2nd
22 March 2003	Fulham	H	3–0	Van Nistelrooy (3) 44', 68', 90'	67,706	2nd
5 April 2003	Liverpool	H	4–0	Van Nistelrooy (2) 5' (pen.), 65' (pen.), Giggs 78', Solskjær 90'	67,639	2nd
12 April 2003	Newcastle United	A	6–2	Solskjær 32', Scholes (3) 34', 38', 52', Giggs 44', Van Nistelrooy 58' (pen.)	52,164	1st
16 April 2003	Arsenal	A	2–2	Van Nistelrooy 24', Giggs 63'	38,164	1st
19 April 2003	Blackburn Rovers	H	3–1	Van Nistelrooy 20', Scholes (2) 42', 61'	67,626	1st
27 April 2003	Tottenham Hotspur	A	2–0	Scholes 69', Van Nistelrooy 90'	36,073	1st
3 May 2003	Charlton Athletic	H	4–1	Beckham 11', Van Nistelrooy (3) 32', 37', 52'	67,721	1st
11 May 2003	Everton	A	2–1	Beckham 45', Van Nistelrooy 79' (pen.)	40,168	1st

Pos	Team	Pld	W	D	L	GF	GA	GD	Pts	Qualification or relegation
1	Manchester United (C)	38	25	8	5	74	34	+40	83	Qualification for the Champions League group stage
2	Arsenal	38	23	9	6	85	42	+43	78	Qualification for the Champions League group stage
3	Newcastle United	38	21	6	11	63	48	+15	69	Qualification for the Champions League third qualifying round
4	Chelsea	38	19	10	9	68	38	+30	67	Qualification for the Champions League third qualifying round
5	Liverpool	38	18	10	10	61	41	+20	64	Qualification for the UEFA Cup first round (Note: Since Liverpool qualified for the UEFA Cup via the league, their place in the UEFA Cup as League Cup winners reverted to the league and was awarded to Blackburn Rovers as the highest-placed team not already qualified for European competitions.)

Source: Premier League
Rules for classification: 1) points; 2) goal difference; 3) number of goals scored.
(C) Champions

== FA Cup ==
Date	Round	Opponents	H/A	Result F–A	Scorers	Attendance
4 January 2003	Round 3	Portsmouth	H	4–1	Van Nistelrooy (2) 5' (pen.), 82' (pen.), Beckham 16', Scholes 89'	67,222
26 January 2003	Round 4	West Ham United	H	6–0	Giggs (2) 8', 29', Van Nistelrooy (2) 49', 58', P. Neville 50', Solskjær 69'	67,181
15 February 2003	Round 5	Arsenal	H	0–2		67,209

== League Cup ==
Date	Round	Opponents	H/A	Result F–A	Scorers	Attendance
5 November 2002	Round 3	Leicester City	H	2–0	Beckham 80' (pen.), Richardson 90'	47,848
3 December 2002	Round 4	Burnley	A	2–0	Forlán 35', Solskjær 65'	22,034
17 December 2002	Round 5	Chelsea	H	1–0	Forlán 80'	57,985
7 January 2003	Semi-final; First leg	Blackburn Rovers	H	1–1	Scholes 58'	62,740
22 January 2003	Semi-final; Second leg	Blackburn Rovers	A	3–1	Scholes (2) 30', 42', Van Nistelrooy 77' (pen.)	29,048
2 March 2003	Final	Liverpool	N	0–2		74,500

== UEFA Champions League ==
=== Third qualifying round ===
Date	Round	Opponents	H/A	Result F–A	Scorers	Attendance
14 August 2002	Third qualifying round First leg	Zalaegerszeg	A	0–1		40,000
27 August 2002	Third qualifying round Second leg	Zalaegerszeg	H	5–0	Van Nistelrooy (2) 6', 76' (pen.), Beckham 15', Scholes 21', Solskjær 84'	66,814

=== Group stage ===
Date	Opponents	H/A	Result F–A	Scorers	Attendance	Group position
18 September 2002	Maccabi Haifa	H	5–2	Giggs 10', Solskjær 35', Verón 46', Van Nistelrooy 54', Forlán 89' (pen.)	63,439	2nd
24 September 2002	Bayer Leverkusen	A	2–1	Van Nistelrooy (2) 31', 44'	22,500	1st
1 October 2002	Olympiacos	H	4–0	Giggs 19', Verón 26', Anatolakis 66' (o.g.), Solskjær 77'	66,902	1st
23 October 2002	Olympiacos	A	3–2	Blanc 21', Verón 59', Scholes 84'	13,220	1st
29 October 2002	Maccabi Haifa	A	0–3		22,000	1st
13 November 2002	Bayer Leverkusen	H	2–0	Verón 42', Van Nistelrooy 69'	66,185	1st

Pos	Team	Pld	W	D	L	GF	GA	GD	Pts	Qualification
1	(England) Manchester United	6	5	0	1	16	8	+8	15	Advance to second group stage
2	(Germany) Bayer Leverkusen	6	3	0	3	9	11	−2	9	Advance to second group stage
3	(Israel) Maccabi Haifa	6	2	1	3	12	12	0	7	Transfer to UEFA Cup
4	(Greece) Olympiacos	6	1	1	4	11	17	−6	4	

Source: RSSSF

=== Second group stage ===
Date	Opponents	H/A	Result F–A	Scorers	Attendance	Group position
26 November 2002	Basel	A	3–1	Van Nistelrooy (2) 62', 63', Solskjær 68'	29,501	1st
11 December 2002	Deportivo La Coruña	H	2–0	Van Nistelrooy (2) 7', 55'	67,014	1st
19 February 2003	Juventus	H	2–1	Brown 4', Van Nistelrooy 85'	66,703	1st
25 February 2003	Juventus	A	3–0	Giggs (2) 15', 41', Van Nistelrooy 63'	59,111	1st
12 March 2003	Basel	H	1–1	G. Neville 53'	66,870	1st
18 March 2003	Deportivo La Coruña	A	0–2		25,000	1st

Pos	Team	Pld	W	D	L	GF	GA	GD	Pts	Qualification
1	(England) Manchester United	6	4	1	1	11	5	+6	13	Advance to knockout stage
2	(Italy) Juventus	6	2	1	3	11	11	0	7	Advance to knockout stage
3	(Switzerland) Basel	6	2	1	3	5	10	−5	7	
4	(Spain) Deportivo La Coruña	6	2	1	3	7	8	−1	7	

Source: RSSSF

=== Knockout phase ===
Date	Round	Opponents	H/A	Result F–A	Scorers	Attendance
8 April 2003	Quarter-final; First leg	Real Madrid	A	1–3	Van Nistelrooy 52'	75,000
23 April 2003	Quarter-final; Second leg	Real Madrid	H	4–3	Van Nistelrooy 43', Helguera 52' (o.g.), Beckham (2) 71', 85'	66,708

== Squad statistics ==
No.	Pos.	Name	League		FA Cup		League Cup		Europe		Total	
No.	Pos.	Name	Apps	Goals	Apps	Goals	Apps	Goals	Apps	Goals	Apps	Goals
1	GK	(France) Fabien Barthez	30	0	2	0	4	0	10	0	46	0
2	DF	(England) Gary Neville	19(7)	0	3	0	5	0	8(2)	1	35(9)	1
3	DF	(England) Phil Neville	19(6)	1	2	1	4	0	10(2)	0	35(8)	2
4	MF	(Argentina) Juan Sebastián Verón	21(4)	2	1	0	4(1)	0	11	4	37(5)	6
5	DF	(France) Laurent Blanc	15(4)	0	1	0	0	0	9	1	25(4)	1
6	DF	(England) Rio Ferdinand	27(1)	0	3	0	4	0	11	0	45(1)	0
7	MF	(England) David Beckham	27(4)	6	3	1	5	1	10(3)	3	45(7)	11
8	MF	(England) Nicky Butt	14(4)	0	0(2)	0	0(1)	0	8	0	22(7)	0
10	FW	(Netherlands) Ruud van Nistelrooy	33(1)	25	3	4	4	1	10(1)	14	50(2)	44
11	MF	(Wales) Ryan Giggs	32(4)	8	3	2	4(1)	0	13(2)	4	52(7)	14
13	GK	(Northern Ireland) Roy Carroll	8(2)	0	1	0	2	0	3	0	14(2)	0
14	DF	(England) David May	0(1)	0	0	0	2	0	0(1)	0	2(2)	0
15	MF	(England) Luke Chadwick	0(1)	0	0	0	1	0	0(3)	0	1(4)	0
16	MF	(Republic of Ireland) Roy Keane (c)	19(2)	0	3	0	2	0	6	0	30(2)	0
17	MF	(Scotland) Michael Stewart	0(1)	0	0(1)	0	1	0	0(1)	0	1(3)	0
18	MF	(England) Paul Scholes	31(2)	14	2(1)	1	4(2)	3	9(1)	2	46(6)	20
19	GK	(Spain) Ricardo	0(1)	0	0	0	0	0	3(1)	0	3(2)	0
20	FW	(Norway) Ole Gunnar Solskjær	29(8)	9	1(1)	1	1(3)	1	9(5)	4	40(17)	15
21	FW	(Uruguay) Diego Forlán	7(18)	6	0(2)	0	3(2)	2	5(8)	1	15(30)	9
22	DF	(Republic of Ireland) John O'Shea	26(6)	0	1	0	3	0	12(4)	0	42(10)	0
24	DF	(England) Wes Brown	22	0	1(1)	0	5	0	6	1	34(1)	1
25	MF	(South Africa) Quinton Fortune	5(4)	0	0	0	1	0	3(3)	0	9(7)	0
26	MF	(England) Danny Pugh	0(1)	0	0	0	1	0	1(2)	0	2(3)	0
27	DF	(France) Mikaël Silvestre	34	1	2	0	5	0	13	0	54	1
31	MF	(Scotland) Darren Fletcher	0	0	0	0	0	0	2	0	2	0
34	DF	(England) Lee Roche	0(1)	0	0	0	0	0	1	0	1(1)	0
37	FW	(England) Danny Webber	0	0	0	0	0	0	0(1)	0	0(1)	0
38	DF	(England) Mark Lynch	0	0	0	0	0	0	1	0	1	0
40	FW	(England) Daniel Nardiello	0	0	0	0	1	0	0(1)	0	1(1)	0
42	MF	(England) Kieran Richardson	0(2)	0	1	0	0(1)	1	2(3)	0	3(6)	1
43	FW	(Denmark) Mads Timm	0	0	0	0	0	0	0(1)	0	0(1)	0

== Transfers ==
United's first departure of the 2002–03 season was Nick Culkin, who was released on 7 July. Trinidad and Tobago forward Dwight Yorke left United for Blackburn Rovers on 26 July for £2 million. Culkin and Yorke were United's only summer departures, but they were not United's only departures of the 2002–03 season.

United's only arrivals of the 2002–03 season were Rio Ferdinand, who joined from United's fierce rivals Leeds United, and Spanish goalkeeper Ricardo, who signed for just £1.5 million.

On 5 June, Lee Roche was released from United on a free transfer. On 30 June, defender Laurent Blanc announced his retirement from football. Also on 30 June, David May was released.

=== In ===
Date	Pos.	Name	From	Fee
22 July 2002	DF	(England) Rio Ferdinand	(England) Leeds United	£29.1m
30 August 2002	GK	(Spain) Ricardo	(Spain) Real Valladolid	£1.5m

=== Out ===
Date	Pos.	Name	To	Fee
7 July 2002	GK	(England) Nick Culkin	(England) Queens Park Rangers	Free
26 July 2002	FW	(Trinidad and Tobago) Dwight Yorke	(England) Blackburn Rovers	£2m
5 June 2003	DF	(England) John Cogger	Released	
5 June 2003	DF	(England) David May	(England) Burnley	Free
5 June 2003	FW	(England) Kalam Mooniaruck	(England) Braintree Town	Free
5 June 2003	MF	(Scotland) John Rankin	(Scotland) Ross County	Free
5 June 2003	DF	(England) Lee Roche	(England) Burnley	Free
30 June 2003	DF	(France) Laurent Blanc	Retired	

=== Loan out ===
Date From	Date To	Pos.	Name	To
9 August 2002	14 November 2002	MF	(England) Jimmy Davis	(England) Swindon Town
12 August 2002	27 October 2002	FW	(England) Danny Webber	(England) Watford
30 August 2002	25 May 2003	MF	(England) Kirk Hilton	(Scotland) Livingston
1 September 2002	1 June 2003	MF	(Sweden) Bojan Djordjic	(Denmark) Aarhus Fremad
11 October 2002	11 December 2002	FW	(England) Ben Muirhead	(England) Doncaster Rovers
7 November 2002	23 March 2003	DF	(England) Paul Tierney	(England) Crewe Alexandra
18 November 2002	4 May 2003	DF	(England) Alan Tate	(Wales) Swansea City
29 November 2002	17 December 2002	GK	(England) Ben Williams	(England) Coventry City
1 January 2003	4 May 2003	GK	(England) Ben Williams	(England) Chesterfield
7 February 2003	19 March 2003	MF	(England) Luke Chadwick	(England) Reading
27 March 2003	15 May 2003	MF	(England) Luke Chadwick	(England) Reading
