= Kiki Kouyaté =

Malian footballer (born 1997)

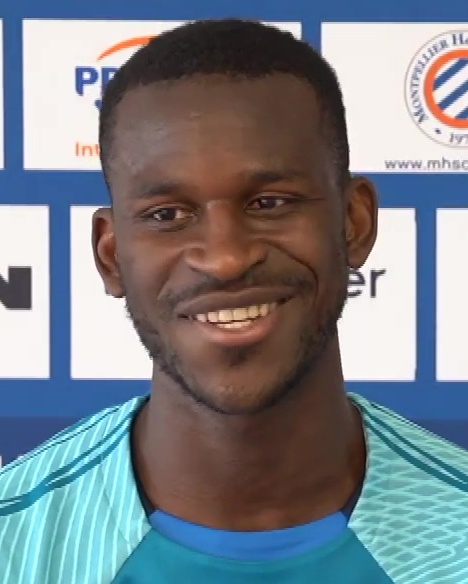
- Kouyaté in 2023

Personal information
- Date of birth: 15 April 1997 (age 29)
- Place of birth: Bamako, Mali
- Height: 1.93 m (6 ft 4 in)
- Position: Centre-back

Team information
- Current team: Al-Khaleej
- Number: 4

Senior career*
Years	Team	Apps	(Gls)
2013–2015	EFC Médije Bamako		
2015–2016	KAC Marrakech	25	(5)
2016–2019	Sporting CP B	45	(0)
2019–2020	Troyes	30	(6)
2020–2023	Metz	67	(2)
2020	Metz B	1	(0)
2023–2025	Montpellier	49	(0)
2025–2026	Antwerp	24	(1)
2026–	Al-Khaleej	8	(1)

International career
2014–2015	Mali U20		
2019–2024	Mali	36	(0)
- * Club domestic league appearances and goals as of 29 October 2026

Boubakar "Kiki" Kouyaté (born 15 April 1997) is a Malian professional footballer who plays as a centre-back for Saudi Pro League club Al-Khaleej.

== Club career ==
=== Early career ===
Kouyaté began his career in 2013 with "Esperance Football Club de Médine" in Bamako at third and second level in Malian football. He signed with Moroccan club KAC Marrakech, playing in the Botola. Having finished third in the previous season, Kawkab qualified for the 2016 CAF Confederation Cup, and the club reached the group stage. Kawkab missed out on qualifying for the knockout stage, and they finished in 14th in the Botola. Kouyaté left the club at the conclusion of the group stage.

=== Sporting CP ===
On 26 August 2016, Kouyaté signed with Portuguese giants Sporting CP, and was assigned to their B-team. He made his professional debut in LigaPro on 11 September in a game against Varzim. Kouyaté made 32 starts in his first season, playing alongside Ivanildo Fernandes at centre-back, as the club finished in 14th.

Kouyaté was included in a senior match-day squad for the first time on 12 October 2017 in a Taça de Portugal match against ARC Oleiros. He made 12 appearances with the reserves in 2017–18 LigaPro, but sustained an injury on 4 February 2018 against Cova da Piedade, missing the rest of the season. Sporting B finished the season in 18th and were relegated. The reserve club was dissolved following the season, preferring to participate in Portugal's new under-23 competition than play in the third-tier. Kouyaté was playing with the under-23 team in the Liga Revelaçao at the time of his transfer, having made 18 appearances.

=== Troyes ===
In January 2019, Kouyaté signed a 3.5-year contract with Troyes in France's second division, Ligue 2, brought in by the club's Portuguese manager, Rui Almeida. His debut came on 1 February playing the final minutes of a 1–1 draw with Metz. His full debut came two weeks later, away to Niort, replacing Jérémy Cordoval at right-back. Kouyaté would start the next five games, the last two on the right of a back three, but was taken off at half-time against Sochaux on 15 March. He wouldn't make another start until a 2–4 win on 10 May against Clermont, a game in which he scored his first goal for the club. Tenth at the time of his acquisition, Troyes were in contention for automatic promotion until the penultimate match-day. Troyes lost in the promotion play-off semi-final to Lens, and Kouyaté finished his first season making 12 appearances. After the season, Almeida left for Caen.

Kouyaté scored on his full season debut, the first goal in a 2–1 defeat to Lens in the Coupe de la Ligue on 9 August, and also scored in the club's next two matches in Ligue 2. Kouyaté made most of his appearances on the right of manager Laurent Batlles's preferred back three, starting 14 of the club's matches in the league in the first half of the season, chipping in with five goals, good enough to make him the club's top goal-scorer. He started Troyes's first two matches out of the break, but picked up an injury against Le Havre on 27 January. Kouyaté would make just one more appearance that season, coming off the bench for added time against Paris FC on 6 March, before the season was cancelled due to the COVID-19 pandemic in France. Kouyaté finished as the club's top goal-scorer, and Troyes finished the season in fourth, two points away from promotion to Ligue 1 after the promotion play-offs were scrapped. For his performances during the season, Kouyaté earned a spot on the bench in L'Équipe's team of the season in Ligue 2. Following the season, Kouyaté was reported to have attracted the interest of English club Nottingham Forest.

=== Metz ===
On 25 August 2020, Kouyaté signed a contract with Metz until 2024.

=== Montpellier ===
On 20 January 2023, Kouyaté joined Ligue 1 side Montpellier. The transfer fee of the deal was reported to be €6 million.

=== Antwerp ===
On 12 August 2025, Kouyaté signed for Belgian club Antwerp.

== International career ==
Kouyaté was part of the Malian squad that reached the 2015 FIFA U-20 World Cup semi-final.

Kouyaté received his first senior call-up in September 2017 for World Cup qualification matches against Morocco. He made his debut for Mali on 26 March 2019 in a friendly against Senegal. Kouyaté was included in the Mali squad for the 2019 Africa Cup of Nations. Mali won their group, but lost in the round of 16 to the Ivory Coast, and Kouyaté started their final group stage game against Angola.

In December 2021, Kouyaté was named by head coach Mohamed Magassouba in Mali's squad for the 2021 Africa Cup of Nations. On 2 January 2024, he was included in the list of twenty-seven Malian players selected by Éric Chelle to compete in the 2023 Africa Cup of Nations.

On 30 July 2025, Kouyaté announced his retirement from the Mali national team.

== Career statistics ==
=== Club ===
As of match played 30 August 2025

Appearances and goals by club, season and competition
Club	Season	League			National cup (Note: Includes Taça de Portugal, Coupe de France)		League cup (Note: Includes Coupe de la Ligue)		Total	
Club	Season	Division	Apps	Goals	Apps	Goals	Apps	Goals	Apps	Goals
Sporting CP B	2016–17	LigaPro	33	0	—		—		33	0
Sporting CP B	2017–18	LigaPro	12	0	0	0	—		12	0
Sporting CP B	Total		45	0	0	0	—		45	0
Troyes	2018–19	Ligue 2	12	1	—		—		12	1
Troyes	2019–20	Ligue 2	18	5	0	0	1	1	19	6
Troyes	Total		30	6	0	0	1	1	31	7
Metz B	2020–21	National 2	1	0	—		—		1	0
Metz	2020–21	Ligue 1	25	1	3	0	—		28	1
Metz	2021–22	Ligue 1	30	1	1	0	—		31	1
Metz	2022–23	Ligue 2	12	0	3	0	—		15	0
Metz	Total		67	2	7	0	—		74	2
Montpellier	2022–23	Ligue 1	15	0	0	0	—		15	0
Montpellier	2023–24	Ligue 1	23	0	0	0	—		23	0
Montpellier	2024–25	Ligue 1	11	0	0	0	—		11	0
Montpellier	Total		49	0	0	0	—		49	0
Antwerp	2025–26	Belgian Pro League	2	0	0	0	—		2	0
Career total			194	8	7	0	1	1	202	9

=== International ===
As of matches played on 6 June 2024

Appearances and goals by national team and year
National team	Year	Apps	Goals
Mali	2019	5	0
Mali	2020	2	0
Mali	2021	6	0
Mali	2022	10	0
Mali	2023	4	0
Mali	2024	7	0
Total		34	0
