= Farouck Adekami =

Malien footballer (born 2004)

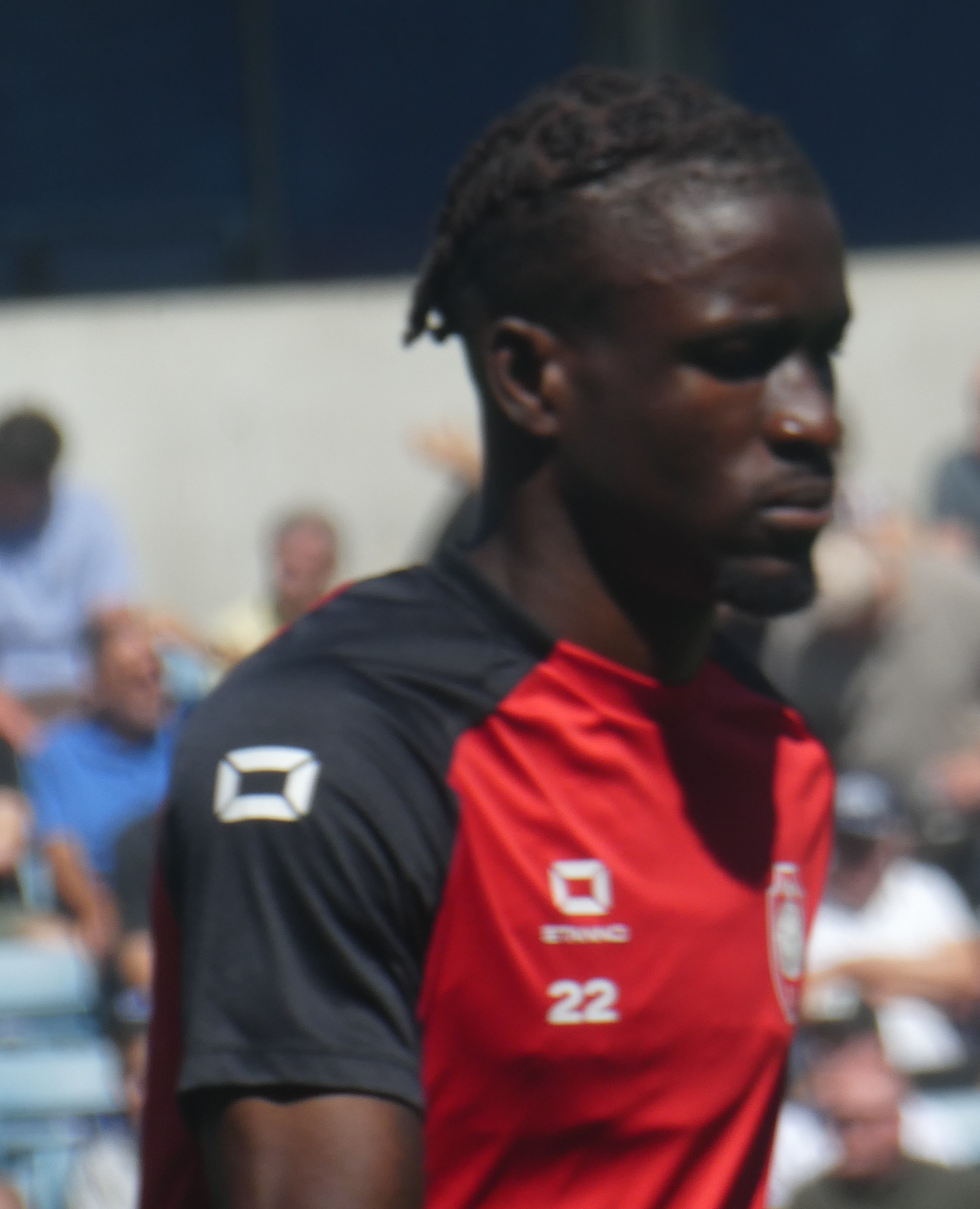

Personal information
- Full name: Muhammed Farouck Adekami
- Date of birth: 7 August 2006 (age 20)
- Place of birth: Ivory Coast
- Position: Attacking midfielder

Team information
- Current team: Royal Antwerp
- Number: 22

Youth career
- –2024: Right to Dream Academy

Senior career*
Years	Team	Apps	(Gls)
2024–2025	Royal Antwerp B	16	(4)
2024–	Royal Antwerp	24	(2)
- * Club domestic league appearances and goals as of 1 June 2026

Muhammed Farouck Adekami (born 7 August 2006) is an Ivorian professional footballer who plays as an attacking midfielder for Belgian Pro League club Royal Antwerp.

== Club career ==
Adekami joined Royal Antwerp on 8 August 2024. Adekami made his professional Belgian Pro League debut for Royal Antwerp against Westerlo on 19 January 2025. He scored his first goal on 10 August 2025 in a 3-1 win against OH Leuven.

== Career statistics ==
=== Club ===
As of match played 1 June 2026

Appearances and goals by club, season and competition
Club	Season	League			Cup		Continental		Other		Total	
Club	Season	Division	Apps	Goals	Apps	Goals	Apps	Goals	Apps	Goals	Apps	Goals
Royal Antwerp B	2024–25	Belgian National Division 1	16	4	—		—		—		16	4
Royal Antwerp	2024–25	Belgian Pro League	3	0	0	0	—		—		3	0
Royal Antwerp	2025–26	Belgian Pro League	21	2	1	0	—		—		22	2
Royal Antwerp	Total		40	6	1	0	0	0	—		41	6
Career total			40	6	1	0	0	0	0	0	41	6
