= Andreas Verstraeten =

Belgian footballer (born 2006)

Personal information
- Date of birth: 10 January 2006 (age 20)
- Place of birth: Herentals, Belgium
- Height: 1.78 m (5 ft 10 in)
- Positions: Centre-back; defensive midfielder

Team information
- Current team: VVV-Venlo (on loan from Royal Antwerp)
- Number: 6

Youth career
- 2011–2013: KFC Heidebloem
- 2013: Beerschot AC
- 2013–2018: Lierse
- 2018–2022: Royal Antwerp

Senior career*
Years	Team	Apps	(Gls)
2022–2026	Young Reds	13	(1)
2024–	Royal Antwerp	32	(0)
2026–	→ VVV-Venlo (loan)	5	(0)

International career^{‡}
2023–2024	Belgium U18	4	(0)
2024–2025	Belgium U19	4	(0)
- * Club domestic league appearances and goals as of 12 October 2026 ‡ National team caps and goals as of 12 October 2026

Andreas Verstraeten (born 10 January 2006) is a Belgian professional footballer who plays as a centre-back for club VVV-Venlo, on loan from Royal Antwerp.

== Club career ==
Born in Herentals, Andreas Verstraeten joined the Royal Antwerp FC academy in 2018.

During the 2022–23 season, he started playing with the reserve team, becoming a regular starter with the National Division 1 team the following season.

He signed his first professional contract with the club in February 2024.

Andreas Verstraeten made his first team debut with Royal Antwerp on the 27 October 2024, Jonas De Roeck starting him as a midfielder in a 3–0 win league over Standard Liège.

In April 2025, Verstraeten signed a contract extension with the club from Antwerp, tying him to the Reds until 2028.

By the 2025–26 season, he established himself as a starter in the Belgian Pro League. But with underwhelming onfield results for the team that only narrowly avoided the relegation play-offs, with several staff changes, Verstraeten ended the season on the bench.

As he was not included in the first team by newly arrived coach Marvin Compper the following season, he was eventually loaned to Dutch Eerste Divisie club VVV-Venlo in the late summer 2026.

== International career ==
Andreas Verstraeten is a youth international for Belgium, first getting called with the under-18 by Sébastien Pocognoli in October 2023.
