= Christopher Scott (footballer, born 2002) =

German footballer (born 2002)

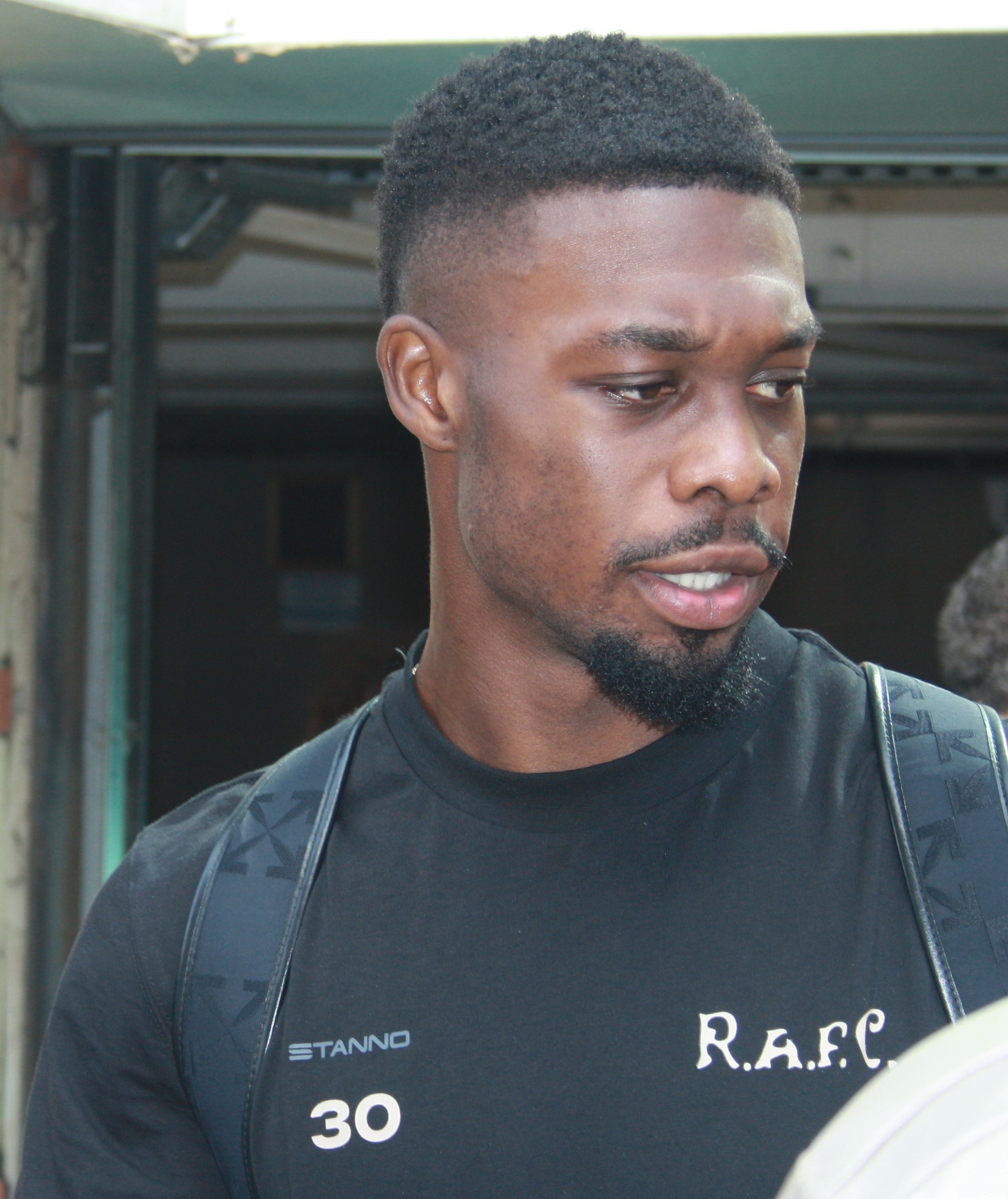

Personal information
- Full name: Christopher Gavin Scott
- Date of birth: 7 June 2002 (age 24)
- Place of birth: Räckelwitz, Germany
- Height: 1.78 m (5 ft 10 in)
- Position: Attacking midfielder

Team information
- Current team: Antwerp
- Number: 30

Youth career
- 2009–2020: Bayer Leverkusen
- 2020: Bayern Munich

Senior career*
Years	Team	Apps	(Gls)
2020–2022	Bayern Munich II	47	(9)
2021–2022	Bayern Munich	2	(0)
2022	Young Reds Antwerp	2	(1)
2022–	Antwerp	70	(7)
2023–2024	→ Hannover 96 (loan)	5	(0)
2023–2024	→ Hannover 96 II (loan)	5	(2)

International career^{‡}
2017	Germany U15	1	(1)
2017–2018	Germany U16	6	(0)
2018	Germany U17	7	(0)
2020	Germany U19	2	(0)
2021–2023	Germany U20	6	(0)
- * Club domestic league appearances and goals as of 1 June 2026 ‡ National team caps and goals as of 27 March 2023

Christopher Gavin Scott (born 7 June 2002) is a German professional footballer who plays as an attacking midfielder for Belgian Pro League club Antwerp. He is a former German youth international.

== Club career ==
Scott made his Bundesliga debut for Bayern Munich during a 1–1 draw against Union Berlin on 10 April 2021.

On 28 June 2022, he was transferred to Belgian Pro League club Royal Antwerp on a four-year deal until 2026, for a reported €1,400,000 fee.

On 1 September 2023, Scott returned to Germany and was loaned out to 2. Bundesliga club Hannover 96 for one season, with the option of a permanent transfer the following season.

== International career ==
Scott was born in Räckelwitz, Germany, and is of Ghanaian descent, he is eligible to represent either Germany or Ghana internationally, having represented Germany at the under-15, under-16, under-17, under-19 and under-20 levels.

== Personal life ==
His younger brother Michael plays as a winger and full-back for Regionalliga Bayern club Bayern Munich II, having progressed through the Bayern Munich youth ranks as well.

== Career statistics ==
As of match played 22 April 2026

Appearances and goals by club, season and competition
Club	Season	League			National cup (Note: Includes Belgian Cup)		Europe		Other		Total	
Club	Season	Division	Apps	Goals	Apps	Goals	Apps	Goals	Apps	Goals	Apps	Goals
Bayern Munich II	2020–21	3. Liga	24	2	–		–		–		24	2
Bayern Munich II	2021–22	Regionalliga Bayern	23	7	–		–		–		23	7
Bayern Munich II	Total		47	9	–		–		–		47	9
Bayern Munich	2020–21	Bundesliga	2	0	0	0	0	0	0	0	2	0
Young Reds Antwerp	2022–23	Belgian National Division 1	2	1	–		–		–		2	1
Antwerp	2022–23	Belgian Pro League	22	1	5	0	3 (Note: Appearances in UEFA Europa Conference League)	0	–		30	1
Antwerp	2023–24	Belgian Pro League	1	0	0	0	0	0	1 (Note: Appearance in Belgian Super Cup)	0	2	0
Antwerp	2024–25	Belgian Pro League	16	0	2	0	–		–		18	0
Antwerp	2025–26	Belgian Pro League	25	5	5	1	–		–		30	6
Antwerp	Total		64	6	12	1	3	0	1	0	80	7
Hannover 96 (loan)	2023–24	2. Bundesliga	5	0	0	0	–		–		5	0
Hannover 96 II (loan)	2023–24	Regionalliga Nord	5	2	–		–		–		5	2
Career total			125	18	12	1	3	0	1	0	141	19

== Honours ==
Royal Antwerp

- Belgian Pro League: 2022–23
- Belgian Cup: 2022–23
- Belgian Super Cup: 2023
