= Rein Van Helden =

Belgian footballer (born 2002)

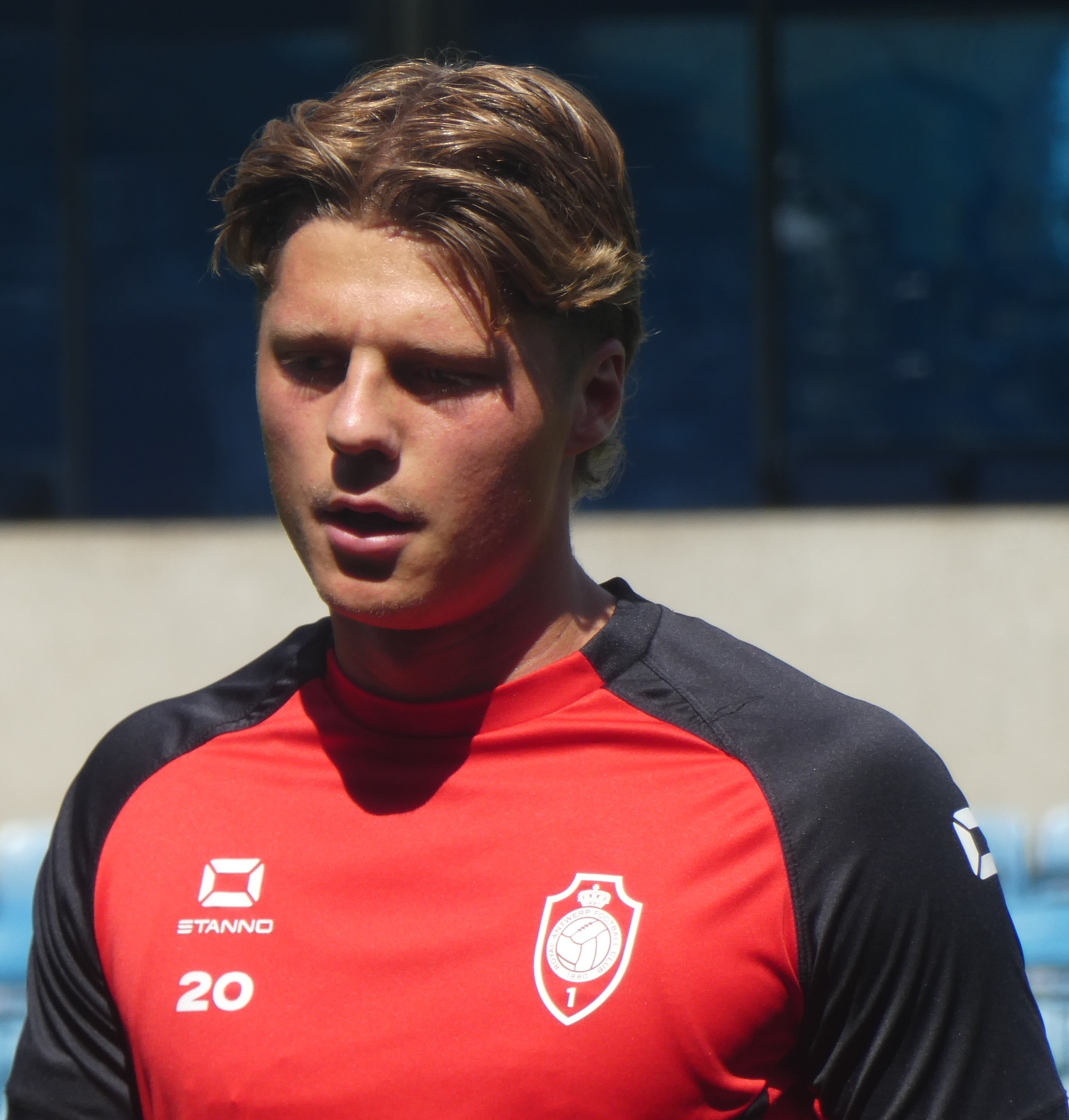
- Van Helden with Antwerp in 2026

Personal information
- Date of birth: 24 July 2002 (age 24)
- Place of birth: Genk, Belgium
- Height: 1.87 m (6 ft 2 in)
- Position: Centre-back

Team information
- Current team: Antwerp
- Number: 20

Youth career
- 2007–2011: Genker VV
- 2011–2016: KRC Genk
- 2016–2021: Sint-Truiden

Senior career*
| Years | Team | Apps | (Gls) |
| 2021–2026 | Sint-Truiden | 77 | (2) |
| 2022–2023 | → MVV (loan) | 33 | (3) |
| 2026– | Antwerp | 17 | (3) |

International career
| 2024 | Belgium U21 | 2 | (0) |
- * Club domestic league appearances and goals as of 11:49, 17 November 2026 (UTC)

Rein Van Helden (born 24 July 2002) is a Belgian professional footballer who plays as a centre-back for Belgian Pro League club Antwerp.

== Career ==
=== Sint-Truiden ===
Van Helden joined the Genk youth academy in 2011 from his childhood club Genker VV. Five years later he moved to the Sint-Truiden academy. He signed his first professional contract with the club in May 2021, after having torn the anterior cruciate ligament on his right knee a few months earlier in February 2021.

==== Loan to MVV ====
On 13 August 2022, Van Helden joined Eerste Divisie club MVV on a one-season loan deal. There, he made his professional debut on 19 August 2022, replacing Mart Remans in injury time of a 3–1 league win over ADO Den Haag. After a difficult start, where he was mainly a substitute, he made his first start for MVV on 16 September in a 4–1 win over Jong Ajax as a replacement for the injured Matteo Waem. He put in a strong performance during the game, and would remain a starter in central defense from then on. On 30 September in a home game against Willem II, Van Helden scored his first professional goal, heading home the 3–2 winner for MVV in the 95th minute to complete a comeback from 2–0 down.

==== Return to Sint-Truiden ====
Van Helden returned to Sint-Truiden at the end of the season, and stated that he was determined to compete for playing time in the new season.

=== Antwerp ===
On 23 January 2026, Van Helden joined Antwerp on a four-and-a-half-year contract.

== Personal life ==
Van Helden is the son of Koen Van Helden, who played professional football for Patro Eisden Maasmechelen, but had to retire prematurely due to a skull fracture. He would later go on to coach Bilzerse Waltwilder VV, Eendracht Mechelen-aan-de-Maas and KFC Park Houthalen.

== Career statistics ==
As of match played 23 January 2026

Appearances and goals by club, season and competition
| Club | Season | League | | | National cup | | Other | | Total | |
| Club | Season | Division | Apps | Goals | Apps | Goals | Apps | Goals | Apps | Goals |
|---|---|---|---|---|---|---|---|---|---|---|
| Sint-Truiden | 2021–22 | Belgian Pro League | 0 | 0 | 0 | 0 | — | | 0 | 0 |
| Sint-Truiden | 2023–24 | Belgian Pro League | 36 | 0 | 1 | 0 | — | | 37 | 0 |
| Sint-Truiden | 2024–25 | Belgian Pro League | 27 | 1 | 3 | 0 | 5 (Note: Appearances in Eredivisie promotion/relegation playoffs) | 0 | 35 | 1 |
| Sint-Truiden | 2025–26 | Belgian Pro League | 21 | 1 | 2 | 0 | — | | 23 | 1 |
| Sint-Truiden | Total | | 84 | 2 | 6 | 0 | 5 | 0 | 95 | 2 |
| MVV (loan) | 2022–23 | Eerste Divisie | 33 | 3 | 1 | 0 | 2 | 0 | 36 | 2 |
| Antwerp | 2025–26 | Belgian Pro League | 0 | 0 | 0 | 0 | 0 | 0 | 0 | 0 |
| Career total | | | 117 | 5 | 7 | 0 | 7 | 0 | 131 | 5 |
