= Kalam Mooniaruck =

Mauritian footballer

Personal information
- Date of birth: 22 November 1983 (age 42)
- Place of birth: Yeovil, England
- Position: Winger

Youth career
- 1997–1999: Norwich City
- 1999–2002: Manchester United

Senior career*
Years	Team	Apps	(Gls)
2003–2004	Braintree Town	17	(2)
2004–2006	Bishop's Stortford Swifts		
2006–2007	Cambridge City	13	(1)
2007	Thurrock	2	(0)
2007	Saffron Walden Town		
2008	Tiptree United		

International career
- England U17
2001	England U20	1	(0)
2005	Mauritius	2	(0)
- * Club domestic league appearances and goals as of 13:00, 7 March 2012 (UTC)

Kalam Mooniaruck (born 22 November 1983) is a footballer who played as a winger. Born in England, he represented the Mauritius national team.

== Playing career ==
Mooniaruck was a member of the youth team at Norwich City, before signing for Manchester United on 3 March 1999 at the age of 13; United attempted to get around the rule that youth team players had to live within 90 minutes of the club by flying him to Manchester from Stansted Airport, and although the Football Association later clarified that it had to be a 90-minute drive, Mooniaruck remained at United. He was released in June 2003 without a single appearance for the first team, despite playing for England U-20 in a friendly match against Germany U-20.

After his release, Mooniaruck had unsuccessful trials with Rotherham United, Queens Park Rangers, Grimsby Town, Wycombe Wanderers, Swindon Town, Sheffield Wednesday and Leyton Orient, before signing for Braintree in August 2003. He was released early in 2004 after the club stated that his skills and style of playing were not suited for the Isthmian League. Following an unsuccessful trial with Cambridge United, He later joined local club Bishop's Stortford Swifts in the same year, playing for the club until 2006.

In August 2006 Kalam joined Cambridge City, before moving to Thurrock in January 2007 and signing for Saffron Walden Town before the end of the season when he announced retirement to become a coach for a David Beckham's football school. He came out of retirement to sign for Tiptree United in 2008, playing two games before leaving football.

== International career ==
Born in England with Mauritian heritage, he played for England U-20 in 2001. In 2005, he played two matches for the Mauritius national football team.

== Coaching career ==
Mooniaruck was Head of Coaching Development at West Ham United and is now The Football Association's Youth Development Phase (YDP) Lead across England's U15 to U16 squads.
