= Yuto Tsunashima =

Japanese footballer (born 2000)

Yuto Tsunashima 綱島 悠斗
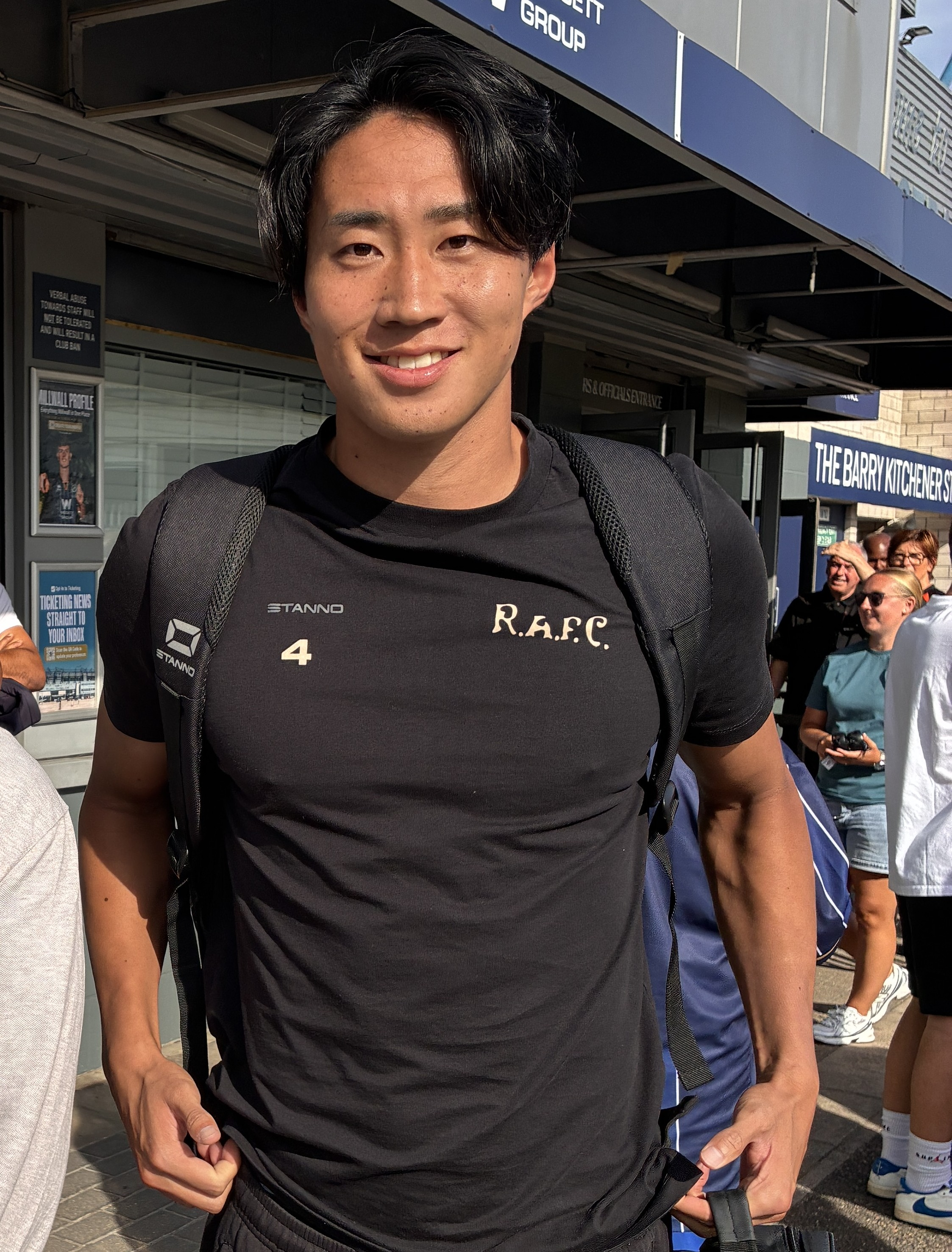

Personal information
- Full name: Yuto Tsunashima
- Date of birth: 15 August 2000 (age 26)
- Place of birth: Sagamihara, Kanagawa, Japan
- Height: 1.88 m (6 ft 2 in)
- Positions: Defensive midfielder; centre-back

Team information
- Current team: Antwerp
- Number: 4

Youth career
- –2012: Sobudai FC New Green
- 2013–2018: Tokyo Verdy

College career
Years	Team	Apps	(Gls)
2019–2022	Kokushikan University		

Senior career*
Years	Team	Apps	(Gls)
2023–2025	Tokyo Verdy	89	(7)
2025–	Antwerp	34	(1)

International career^{‡}
2025–	Japan	1	(0)
- * Club domestic league appearances and goals as of 08:35, 29 May 2026 (UTC) ‡ National team caps and goals as of 12 July 2025

Yuto Tsunashima (綱島 悠斗, Tsunashima Yūto; born 15 August 2000) is a Japanese professional footballer who plays as a defensive midfielder or centre-back for Belgian Pro League club Antwerp and the Japan national team.

== Club career ==
Tsunashima started his football career with Sobudai FC New Green and then spent time with Tokyo Verdy before joining university. He featured in the 2021 and 2022 editions of the All Japan University Football Championship for Kokushikan University before going on to sign for J2 League side Tokyo Verdy ahead of the 2023 season. On 12 March 2023, he made his professional league debut, appearing as a late substitute in a 2–0 win over Tokushima Vortis. On 6 August 2025, Tsunashima signed a three-year deal with Belgian Pro League club Antwerp.

== International career ==
In July 2025, Tsunashima earned his first call-up to the Japan team when he was named in their squad for the 2025 EAFF E-1 Football Championship. On 12 July 2025, he made his international debut, playing the full match in a 2–0 win over China.

== Honours ==
Japan

- EAFF Championship: 2025
