= Daam Foulon =

Belgian footballer

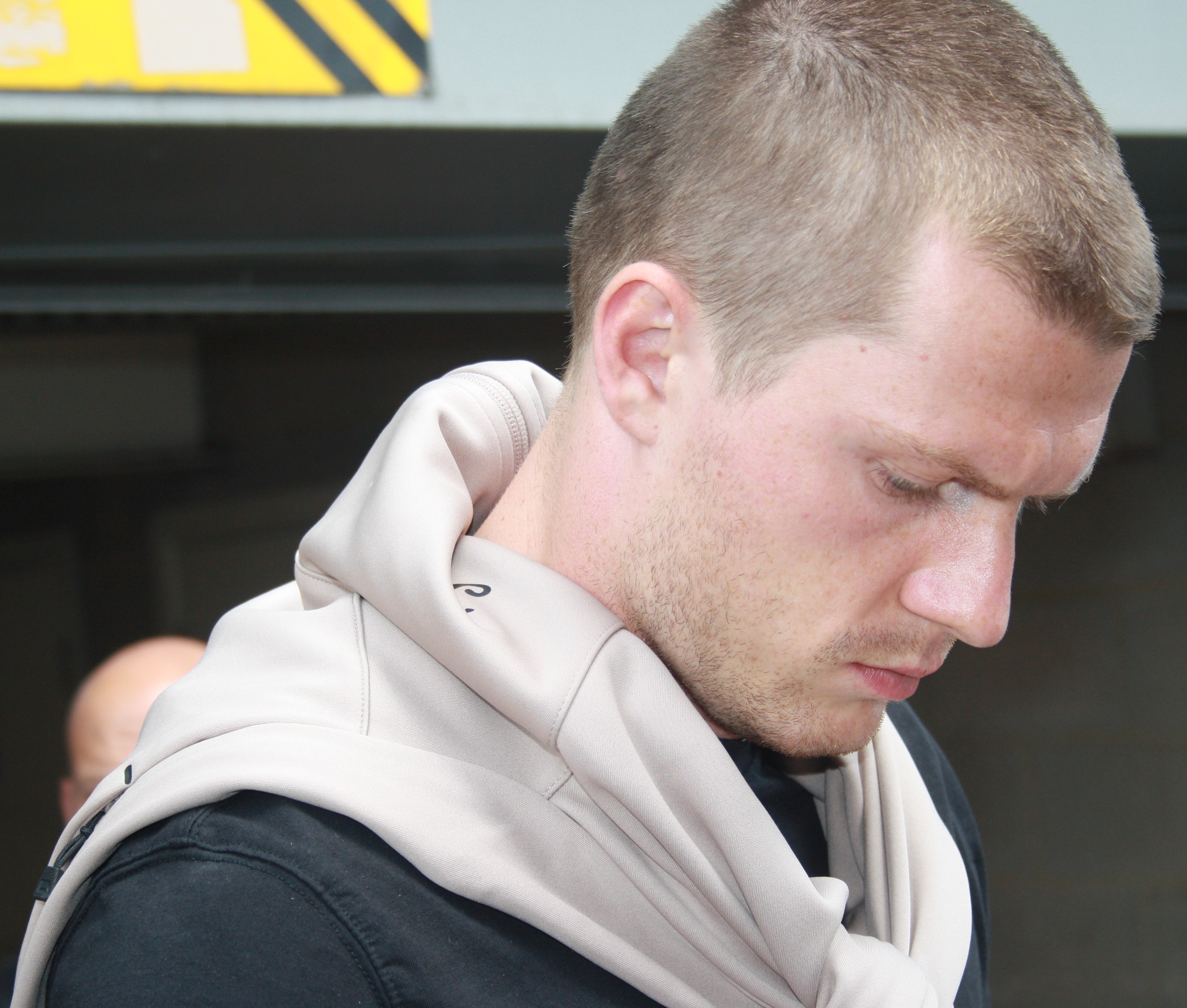

Personal information
- Date of birth: 23 March 1999 (age 27)
- Place of birth: Mechelen, Belgium
- Height: 1.80 m (5 ft 11 in)
- Position: Left back

Team information
- Current team: Antwerp
- Number: 5

Youth career
- 2015–2018: Anderlecht

Senior career*
Years	Team	Apps	(Gls)
2018–2020	Waasland-Beveren	46	(0)
2020–2023	Benevento	81	(3)
2023–2025	Mechelen	61	(6)
2025–	Antwerp	33	(0)

International career^{‡}
2014	Belgium U15	2	(0)
2014–2015	Belgium U16	5	(0)
2015–2016	Belgium U17	17	(0)
2016–2017	Belgium U18	4	(1)
2017–2018	Belgium U19	10	(1)
- * Club domestic league appearances and goals as of 1 June 2026 ‡ National team caps and goals as of 3 July 2018

Daam Foulon (born 23 March 1999) is a Belgian footballer who plays as a defender for Belgian Pro League club Antwerp.

== Club career ==
On 7 July 2023, Foulon signed a two-year contract with Mechelen.

On 19 March 2025, Foulon agreed to join Antwerp in July 2025 on a three-year deal.

== Career statistics ==
As of match played 12 April 2021

Appearances and goals by club, season and competition
Club	Season	League			National Cup		Continental		Total	
Club	Season	Division	Apps	Goals	Apps	Goals	Apps	Goals	Apps	Goals
Waasland-Beveren	2017–18	Pro League	4	0	–		–		4	0
Waasland-Beveren	2018–19	Pro League	18	0	1	0	–		19	0
Waasland-Beveren	2019–20	Pro League	23	0	0	0	–		23	0
Waasland-Beveren	2020–21	Pro League	1	0	–		–		1	0
Waasland-Beveren	Total		46	0	1	0	0	0	47	0
Benevento	2020–21	Serie A	22	0	1	0	–		23	0
Career total			68	0	2	0	0	0	70	0
