= Taishi Nozawa =

Japanese association football player

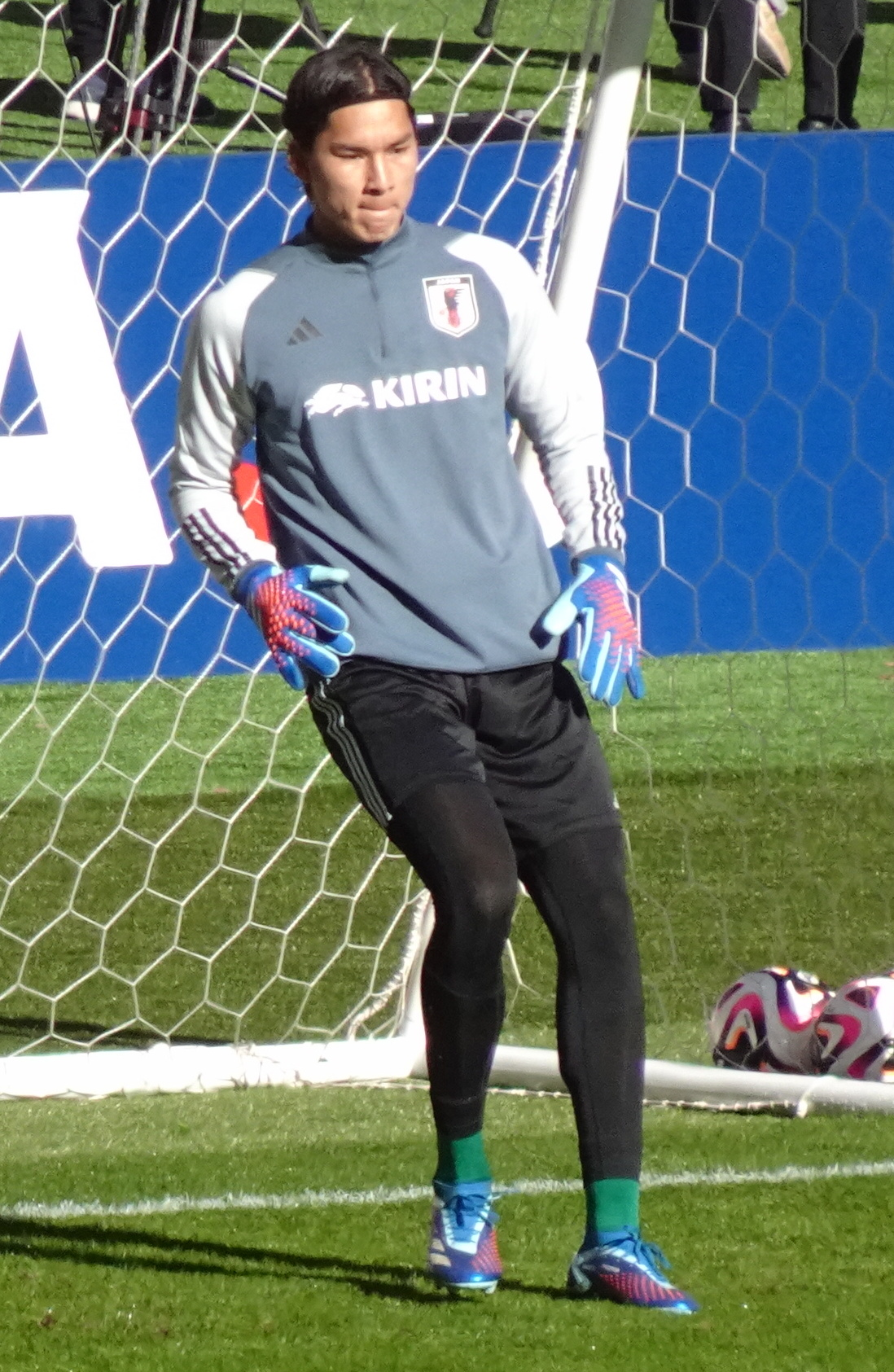

Personal information
- Full name: Taishi Brandon Nozawa
- Date of birth: 25 December 2002 (age 23)
- Place of birth: Ginowan, Okinawa, Japan
- Height: 1.93 m (6 ft 4 in)
- Position: Goalkeeper

Team information
- Current team: Antwerp
- Number: 41

Youth career
- Nagata Dragon FC
- 2014–2017: FC Ryukyu
- 2018–2019: FC Tokyo

Senior career*
Years	Team	Apps	(Gls)
2018–2019	FC Tokyo U-23	5	(0)
2020–2025	FC Tokyo	54	(0)
2021–2022	→ Iwate Grulla Morioka (loan)	36	(0)
2025–	Antwerp	30	(0)

International career^{‡}
2017	Japan U15	2	(0)
2018	Japan U16	5	(0)
2019	Japan U17	4	(0)
2019	Japan U18	2	(0)
2024	Japan U23	1	(0)
Medal record
Representing Japan
AFC U-23 Asian Cup
Gold medal – first place	2024 Qatar
AFC U-16 Championship
Gold medal – first place	2018
- * Club domestic league appearances and goals as of 1 June 2026 ‡ National team caps and goals as of 22 April 2024

Taishi Brandon Nozawa (野澤 大志 ブランドン, Nozawa Taishi Burandon; born 25 December 2002) is a Japanese professional footballer who plays as a goalkeeper for Belgian Pro League club Antwerp.

== Club career ==
On 26 June 2025, Nozawa signed a four-year contract with Antwerp in Belgium.

== International career ==
Nozawa is eligible to represent either Japan or the United States.

Nozawa has been representing Japan since 2017, playing for each youth team. Particularly, in 2018, he contributed to the victory of 2018 AFC U-16 Championship.

In December 2023, he was first called up to Japan for the game against Thailand, that was held on New Year’s Day 2024.

On 4 April 2024, Nozawa was called up to the Japan U23 squad for the 2024 AFC U-23 Asian Cup.

== Career statistics ==
=== Club ===
As of 9 December 2023

Appearances and goals by club, season and competition
Club	Season	League			National Cup		League Cup		Total	
Club	Season	Division	Apps	Goals	Apps	Goals	Apps	Goals	Apps	Goals
Japan			League		Emperor's Cup		J.League Cup		Total	
FC Tokyo U-23	2019	J3 League	6	0	—		—		6	0
FC Tokyo	2020	J1 League	0	0	0	0	0	0	0	0
FC Tokyo	2021	J1 League	0	0	0	0	1	0	1	0
FC Tokyo	2023	J1 League	10	0	1	0	6	0	17	0
FC Tokyo	Total		10	0	1	0	7	0	81	0
Iwate Grulla Morioka (loan)	2021	J3 League	14	0	0	0	—		14	0
Iwate Grulla Morioka (loan)	2022	J2 League	22	0	0	0	—		22	0
Iwate Grulla Morioka (loan)	Total		36	0	0	0	0	0	36	0
Career total			52	0	1	0	7	0	60	0

== Honours ==
Japan U16

- AFC U-16 Championship: 2018

Japan U23

- AFC U-23 Asian Cup: 2024

== Personal life ==
Nozawa is one of the few public Christian sportspeople in Japan, and frequently posts about his faith on social media.

In January 2025, he announced that he had gotten married.
