= Youssef Hamdaoui =

Moroccan footballer (born 2006)

Personal information
- Date of birth: 20 March 2008 (age 18)
- Place of birth: Antwerp, Belgium
- Position: Midfielder

Team information
- Current team: Royal Antwerp
- Number: 43

Youth career
- 2013–2023: Royal Antwerp

Senior career*
Years	Team	Apps	(Gls)
2024–	Young Reds	31	(1)
2025–	Royal Antwerp	22	(1)

International career^{‡}
2023	Belgium U15	5	(0)
2024	Belgium U16	3	(0)
2024	Belgium U17	5	(1)
2025–	Morocco U18	2	(0)
- * Club domestic league appearances and goals as of 1 June 2026 ‡ National team caps and goals as of 27 February 2025

Youssef Hamdaoui (Arabic: يوسف حمداوي; born 20 March 2008) is a footballer who plays as a midfielder for Belgian Pro League club Royal Antwerp. Born in Belgium, he is a youth international for Morocco.

== Club career ==
=== Antwerp ===
A youth product of Royal Antwerp since he was a U8, Hamdaoui signed his first professional contract with the club on 29 May 2024 until 2027. On 2 February 2025, he made his professional debut with Royal Antwerp against Club Brugge K.V..

== International career ==
Born in Belgium, Hamdaoui is of Moroccan descent and holds dual Belgian and Moroccan citizenship. First a youth international for Belgium, Hamdaoui opted to play for the Morocco U18s in August 2025.
