= Kirk Hilton =

English footballer

Personal information
- Full name: Kirk Hilton
- Date of birth: 2 April 1981 (age 45)
- Place of birth: Flixton, England
- Height: 1.73 m (5 ft 8 in)
- Position: Defender

Youth career
- 1997–1999: Manchester United

Senior career*
Years	Team	Apps	(Gls)
1999–2003	Manchester United	0	(0)
1999–2000	→ Royal Antwerp (loan)	11	(1)
2002–2003	→ Livingston (loan)		
2003–2004	Blackpool	14	(1)
2004–2006	Altrincham		
2006–2008	Royal Antwerp	23	(0)
- * Club domestic league appearances and goals as of 17:24, 19 March 2009 (UTC)

Kirk Hilton (born 2 April 1981) is an English former professional footballer who played in the Football League for Blackpool.

== Club career ==
Hilton began his career in the Manchester United youth programme. He was released from United and played for clubs such as Altrincham and Blackpool, before being last seen playing as a defender for Royal Antwerp.

== After football ==
Hilton retired aged 28 after a hip operation. He later moved to Dubai and founded a football academy.
