= Royal Antwerp FC =

Association football club in Belgium

Royal Antwerp
- Full name: Royal Antwerp Football Club
- Nicknames: The Great Old, The Reds
- Founded: 1880; 146 years ago
- Ground: Bosuilstadion
- Capacity: 21,000
- Owner: Paul Gheysens
- Chairman: Paul Gheysens
- Head coach: Marvin Compper
- League: Belgian Pro League
- 2025–26: Belgian Pro League, 11th of 16
- Website: www.rafc.be
| Home colours | Away colours | Third colours |

Royal Antwerp Football Club, commonly referred to as Royal Antwerp or simply Antwerp, is a Belgian professional football club based in the city of Antwerp. The team competes in the Belgian Pro League, the top tier of the Belgian football league system. Founded in 1880, it is the oldest football club in Belgium.

The club has won five Belgian league championships and four Belgian Cup titles, including a domestic double in the 2022–23 season. In European competition, Antwerp reached the final of the European Cup Winners' Cup in 1993 and qualified for the UEFA Champions League group stage for the first time in the 2023–24 season.

Antwerp's traditional kit colours are red and white. Since 1923, the club has played its home matches at the Bosuilstadion, located in the Deurne district of Antwerp.

== History ==
=== Early history (1880–1999) ===
The Antwerp Football and Cricket Club was founded in 1880 by British workers based in Antwerp, 15 years before the creation of the Royal Belgian Football Association. Initially focused on cricket and general athletic activities, the club did not establish organized football until 1887, when the football division was founded with its own board and named Antwerp Football Club. As the oldest active club at the time, it was the first to register with the Association in 1895. Consequently, when matricule numbers were introduced in 1926, the club received matricule number one.

In 1900, many of the players left Royal Antwerp for the new club of Beerschot A.C. based in the Kiel neighborhood, igniting the start of a long rivalry between both clubs. Royal Antwerp became the most recent Belgian team to reach a European final when it advanced to the 1993 European Cup Winners’ Cup Final. Facing Parma at London’s Wembley Stadium on 12 May 1993, striker Francis Severeyns equalized early, but Antwerp ultimately lost 3–1.

Royal Antwerp had a long-term partnership with English club Manchester United from 1998 to 2015, taking their young players on loan to give them first-team experience. Players who required European work permits also benefited from Belgium's more relaxed regulations. An example of the latter was Chinese international Dong Fangzhuo, who was unable to play for United immediately due to work permit issues and was loaned to Antwerp to gain first-team experience.

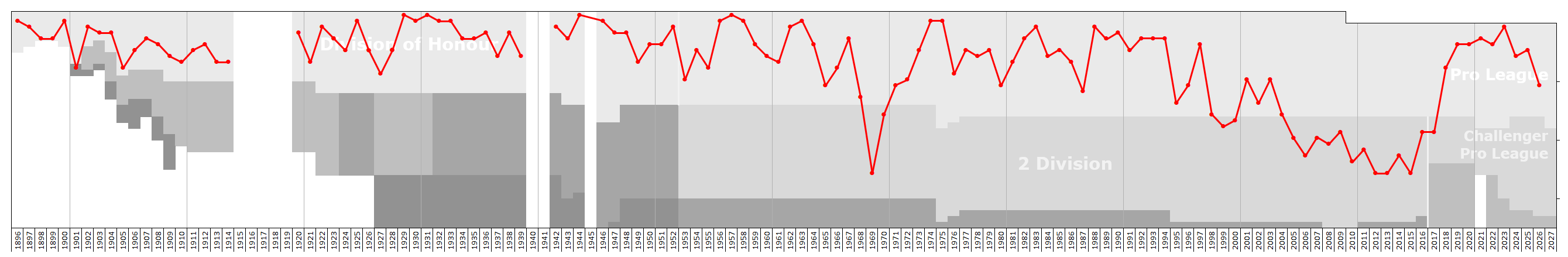
Historical chart of Antwerp league performance

=== Decline, revival, and 5th national championship (2001–present) ===
Despite being one of Belgium's best-supported clubs, Antwerp spent several seasons in the lower divisions during the early 21st century. The club earned promotion back to the top flight in 2000, only to suffer relegation again in 2004. After 13 years in the second tier, Antwerp returned to the First Division A in 2017, securing a 5–2 aggregate victory over Roeselare in the promotion playoff.

After achieving promotion back to the top flight, the club appointed experienced Romanian manager László Bölöni, and demoted his predecessor Wim De Decker to assistant. In his second season, 2018–19, the club qualified for the UEFA Europa League, its first European competition in 25 years. Antwerp won 3–2 in the playoff final against Charleroi, who had led 2–0 after 12 minutes. Their European campaign began with a win over Viktoria Plzeň on the away goals rule in the third qualifying round, followed by a 5–2 loss to AZ Alkmaar of the Netherlands in the playoff.

In May 2020 Bölöni left at the end of his contract. Four months later, under coach Ivan Leko, Antwerp captured their first major trophy in nearly 30 years by defeating Club Brugge 1–0 in the 2020 Belgian Cup final. Israel's Lior Refaelov, a former Brugge player, scored the decisive goal. Ivan Leko led the team through the Europa League group stage in second place, with four wins including one over José Mourinho's Tottenham Hotspur. He left for Shanghai Port at the end of 2020.

Former Netherlands international Mark van Bommel was appointed manager in May 2022. He brought in several compatriots, including Vincent Janssen, who scored the first goal of a 2–0 win over neighbours Mechelen in the 2023 Belgian Cup final.

A major milestone in the club's resurgence occurred on 4 June 2023, when captain Toby Alderweireld scored a 94th-minute equalizer in a 2–2 draw at Genk. The goal secured Antwerp's first national championship in 66 years, ending a title drought since 1957.

Antwerp qualified for the UEFA Champions League group stage for the first time on 30 August 2023. They sealed the achievement by overcoming AEK Athens 3–1 on aggregate in the playoff round, with Michel-Ange Balikwisha scoring late in Athens to send the club into the competition proper.

Antwerp's first UEFA Champions League group stage campaign, in 2023–24, ended with a 3–2 victory over Barcelona at the Bosuilstadion, their first-ever win in the competition. They finished bottom of Group H that season. On the domestic front, they placed 6th in the Pro League and were beaten finalists in the Belgian Cup, losing 1–0 to Union Saint‑Gilloise in May 2024.

== Stadium ==
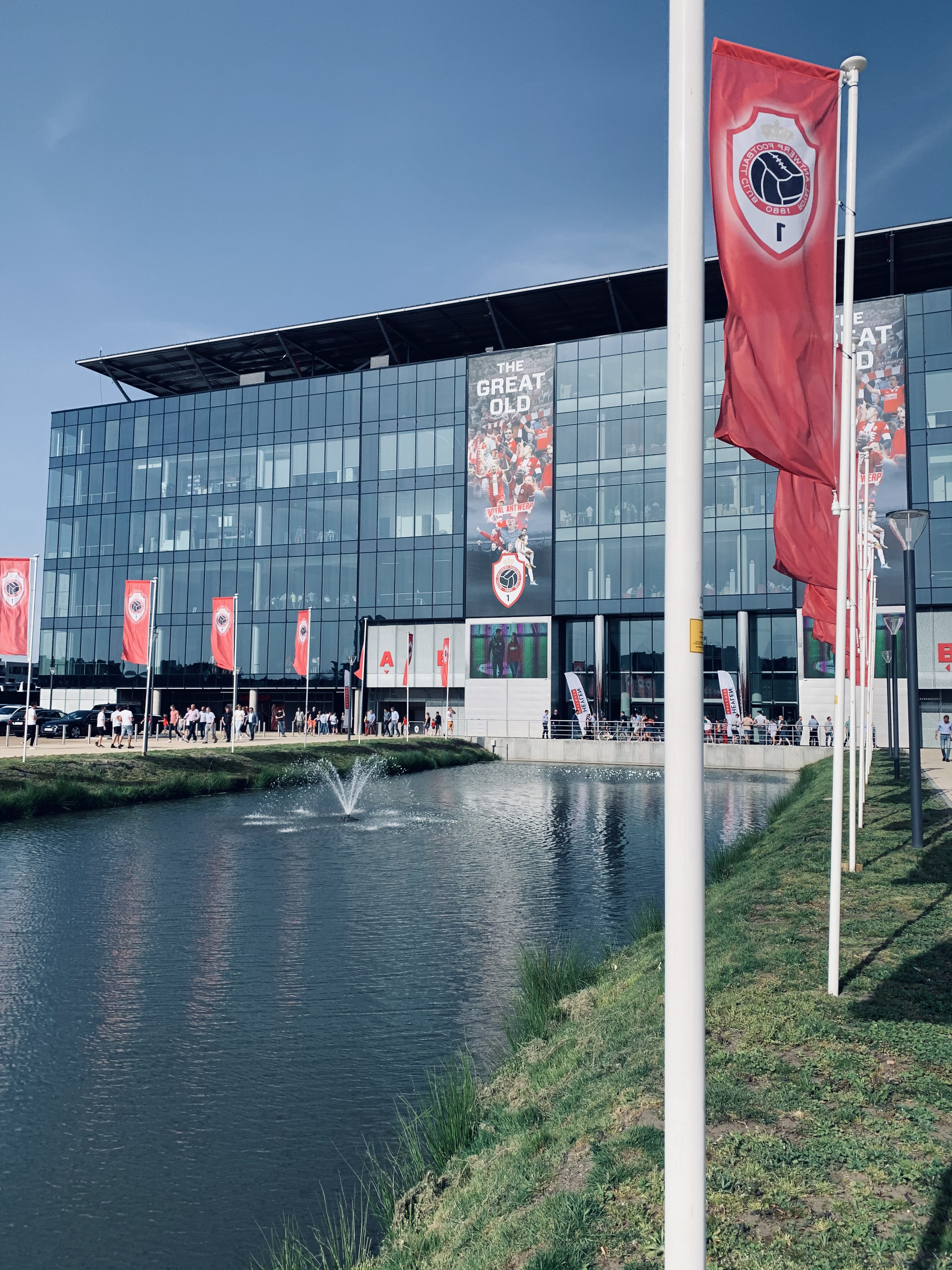

Royal Antwerp have played their home matches at the Bosuilstadion since 1923.

== Rivalries ==
Royal Antwerp share a fierce rivalry with city neighbours Beerschot A.C. (now known as K Beerschot VA). Although in the 2000s and 2010s the two clubs met sparingly, their encounters often involved fan violence. Royal Antwerp are often seen as a culture club with a diverse, cross-class support across the city while Beerschot have either heavily working class or upper class support, locally based in South Antwerp. Beerschot supporters often refer to RAFC fans as "joden" or "Jews" as the RAFC fans must pass through the Jewish district to arrive at Antwerp's stadium, while Great Old supporters refer to Beerschot followers as "the rats".

| Season | Division | Royal Antwerp vs K Beerschot VAC | | | | K Beerschot VAC vs Royal Antwerp | | | |
| Season | Division | Date | Venue | Score | Attendance | Date | Venue | Score | Attendance |
|---|---|---|---|---|---|---|---|---|---|
| 1976–77 | First Division | 28 November 1976 | Bosuilstadion | 2 – 1 | | 26 November 1977 | Olympisch Stadion | 2 – 0 | |
| 1977–78 | First Division | 15 April 1978 | Bosuilstadion | 0 – 0 | | 26 November 1977 | Olympisch Stadion | 4 – 2 | |
| 1978–79 | First Division | 10 December 1978 | Bosuilstadion | 2 – 2 | | 20 May 1979 | Olympisch Stadion | 0 – 3 | |
| 1979–80 | First Division | 20 January 1980 | Bosuilstadion | 1 – 1 | | 15 September 1979 | Olympisch Stadion | 1 – 1 | |
| 1980–81 | First Division | 5 October 1980 | Bosuilstadion | 3 – 2 | | 13 February 1981 | Olympisch Stadion | 0 – 1 | |
| 1982–83 | First Division | 28 November 1982 | Bosuilstadion | 2 – 1 | | 9 April 1983 | Olympisch Stadion | 0 – 1 | |
| 1983–84 | First Division | 15 October 1983 | Bosuilstadion | 0 – 1 | | 18 February 1984 | Olympisch Stadion | 1 – 4 | |
| 1984–85 | First Division | 17 April 1985 | Bosuilstadion | 3 – 1 | | 8 September 1984 | Olympisch Stadion | 2 – 0 | |
| 1985–86 | First Division | 20 October 1985 | Bosuilstadion | 2 – 2 | | 15 March 1986 | Olympisch Stadion | 0 – 0 | |
| 1986–87 | First Division | 15 February 1987 | Bosuilstadion | 1 – 1 | | 13 September 1986 | Olympisch Stadion | 0 – 0 | |
| 1987–88 | First Division | 4 October 1987 | Bosuilstadion | 2 – 1 | | 19 March 1988 | Olympisch Stadion | 0 – 2 | |
| 1988–89 | First Division | 25 February 1989 | Bosuilstadion | 4 – 1 | | 2 September 1988 | Olympisch Stadion | 5 – 1 | |
| 1989–90 | First Division | 17 February 1990 | Bosuilstadion | 4 – 0 | | 16 September 1989 | Olympisch Stadion | 1 – 1 | |
| 1990–91 | First Division | 7 October 1990 | Bosuilstadion | 3 – 0 | | 23 March 1991 | Olympisch Stadion | 1 – 2 | |
| Season | Division | Royal Antwerp vs K Beerschot VA | | | | K Beerschot VA vs Royal Antwerp | | | |
| Season | Division | Date | Venue | Score | Attendance | Date | Venue | Score | Attendance |
| 2017–18 | Europa League playoff | 15 April 2018 | Bosuilstadion | 2 – 0 | 14,194 | 29 April 2018 | Olympisch Stadion | 0 – 0 | 8,600 |
| 2020–21 | First Division A | 25 October 2020 | Bosuilstadion | 3 – 2 | 0 | 7 February 2021 | Olympisch Stadion | 1 – 2 | 0 |
| 2021–22 | First Division A | | Bosuilstadion | 2 – 1 | 16,144 | 5 December 2021 | Olympisch Stadion | 0 – 1 | 11,000 |
| 2024–25 | Pro League | 29 September 2024 | Bosuilstadion | 5 – 0 | 16,430 | | | | |

RAFC also have developed a long-standing rivalry with Club Brugge. They also have a local rivalry with KV Mechelen, although there is mutual respect due to a shared hatred of Beerschot.

== Meuse/Scheldt Cup ==
The best football players of Antwerp and Rotterdam contested a yearly match between 1909 and 1959 for the Meuse- and Scheldt Cup (Maas- en Schelde Beker). It was agreed to play the game at Antwerp's stadium De Bosuil in Belgium and at Sparta Rotterdam's Het Kasteel stadium in the Netherlands. The cup was provided in 1909 by P. Havenith from Antwerp and Kees van Hasselt from Rotterdam.

== Honours ==
Royal Antwerp F.C. honours
| Type | Competition | Titles | Seasons |
|---|---|---|---|
| Domestic | Belgian First Division | 5 | 1928–29, 1930–31, 1943–44, 1956–57, 2022–23 |
| Domestic | Belgian Second Division | 2 | 1999–2000, 2016–17 |
| Domestic | Belgian Cup | 4 | 1954–55, 1991–92, 2019–20, 2022–23 |
| Domestic | Belgian Super Cup | 1 | 2023 |

=== Continental ===
- Challenge International du Nord
  - Winners (2): 1902, 1906
- European Cup Winners' Cup
  - Runners-up: 1992–93

== Players ==
=== Current squad ===
As of 4 September 2026

Note: Flags indicate national team as defined under FIFA eligibility rules; some limited exceptions apply. Players may hold more than one non-FIFA nationality.

| No. | Pos. | Nation | Player |
|---|---|---|---|
| 3 | DF | ESP | Álvaro Cortés |
| 4 | DF | JPN | Yuto Tsunashima |
| 5 | DF | BEL | Daam Foulon |
| 6 | MF | MTN | Bahmed Deuff (on loan from Nantes) |
| 8 | MF | ARG | Mauricio Benítez |
| 9 | FW | SUI | Michael Frey |
| 14 | MF | BEL | Xander Dierckx |
| 15 | GK | BEL | Yannick Thoelen |
| 16 | MF | BEL | Louie Van Gelder |
| 17 | DF | BEL | Semm Renders |
| 19 | FW | UZB | Mukhammadali Urinboev |
| 20 | DF | BEL | Rein Van Helden |
| 22 | MF | CIV | Farouck Adekami |
| 23 | FW | JPN | Koki Ando |
| 24 | DF | BEL | Thibo Somers |

| No. | Pos. | Nation | Player |
|---|---|---|---|
| 25 | MF | CIV | Modibo Fofana |
| 27 | DF | BEL | Eran Tuypens |
| 28 | DF | BEL | Luca Schelfhout |
| 29 | FW | BEL | Jeff Godelaine |
| 30 | MF | GER | Christopher Scott |
| 33 | FW | ECU | Snayder Porozo |
| 41 | GK | JPN | Taishi Nozawa |
| 43 | MF | MAR | Youssef Hamdaoui |
| 44 | DF | BEL | Maxime Busi |
| 48 | MF | BEL | Arthur Vermeeren (on loan from RB Leipzig) |
| 77 | FW | MAR | Ibrahim Salah (on loan from Basel) |
| 80 | FW | ECU | Carlos Mejía |
| 81 | GK | BEL | Niels Devalckeneer |
| 99 | FW | GHA | Luis Narh |

=== Out on loan ===
Note: Flags indicate national team as defined under FIFA eligibility rules; some limited exceptions apply. Players may hold more than one non-FIFA nationality.

| No. | Pos. | Nation | Player |
|---|---|---|---|
| — | MF | BEL | Andreas Verstraeten (at VVV-Venlo until 30 June 2027) |
| — | FW | NGR | Gabriel Jesus David (at SKN St. Pölten until 30 June 2027) |

| No. | Pos. | Nation | Player |
|---|---|---|---|
| — | FW | BEL | Gerard Vandeplas (at Dender EH until 30 June 2027) |

=== Young Reds Antwerp ===
As of 11 February 2025

Note: Flags indicate national team as defined under FIFA eligibility rules; some limited exceptions apply. Players may hold more than one non-FIFA nationality.

| No. | Pos. | Nation | Player |
|---|---|---|---|
| 47 | DF | BEL | Mathijs Gielkens |
| 51 | GK | BEL | Marcel Van Dijck |
| 56 | DF | BEL | Eran Tuypens |
| 60 | MF | BEL | Idrissa Keita |
| 61 | GK | BEL | Lowie Piselé |
| 63 | FW | BEL | Paco Avoki |
| 64 | MF | BEL | Nano Schoenaerts |
| 66 | MF | BEL | Toon Franssen |
| 67 | DF | CIV | Arouna Koné |
| 68 | FW | BEL | Khoi Pham Anh |
| 69 | FW | BEL | Luka Vereecken |
| 70 | DF | BEL | Luca Schelfhout |
| 71 | GK | BEL | Matti Merckx |
| 72 | DF | BEL | Dries Verdonck |

| No. | Pos. | Nation | Player |
|---|---|---|---|
| 74 | FW | BEL | Lennox Valhelmont |
| 75 | FW | KEN | Wilkims Ochieng |
| 76 | FW | NGR | Orseer Achihi |
| 77 | MF | BEL | Milo Horemans |
| 79 | FW | BEL | Gerard Vandeplas |
| 80 | FW | BEL | Richmond Fordjour |
| 81 | GK | BEL | Niels Devalckeneer |
| 82 | MF | BEL | Louie Van Gelder |
| 83 | FW | BEL | Jeff Godelaine |
| 84 | DF | BEL | Jediaél Mbambi |
| 87 | FW | TOG | Abdel-Malik Aziz |
| 88 | MF | BEL | Jef Luyckx |
| 93 | MF | BEL | Mohamed Waki |
| 99 | FW | BEL | Caua Foroni |

== Technical staff ==
| Position | Name |
|---|---|
| Head coach | (Netherlands) Joseph Oosting |
| Assistant coach | (Belgium) Faris Haroun (Netherlands) Robert Molenaar (Netherlands) Nicky Hofs |
| Goalkeeping coach | (Belgium) Brian Vandenbussche |
| Fitness coach | (Belgium) Shaun Huygaerts (Belgium) Thomas Carpels |
| Match analyst | (Belgium) Jonas Dioos |
| Physiotherapist | (Belgium) Dries Meeusen |
| Technical director | (Netherlands) Marc Overmars |

== Manchester United Players loan partnership ==
This is a list of former players acquired on-loan via Manchester United's partnership with Royal Antwerp from 1998 to 2013.

- (Cayman Islands) Jamie Wood
- (China) Dong Fangzhuo
- (Qatar) Hussein Yasser
- (England) Fraizer Campbell
- (England) Luke Chadwick
- (England) John Cofie
- (England) Jimmy Davis
- (England) Sylvan Ebanks-Blake
- (England) Adam Eckersley
- (England) David Fox
- (England) Luke Giverin
- (England) Colin Heath
- (England) Tom Heaton
- (England) Kirk Hilton
- (England) Eddie Johnson
- (England) Ritchie Jones
- (England) Michael Lea
- (England) Lee Martin
- (England) Paul Rachubka
- (England) Ryan Shawcross
- (England) Danny Simpson
- (England) Alan Tate
- (England) Ronnie Wallwork
- (England) Neil Wood
- (The Gambia) Arthur Gómez
- (Gibraltar) Danny Higginbotham
- (Republic of Ireland) Darron Gibson
- (Republic of Ireland) John O'Shea
- (Netherlands) Gyliano van Velzen
- (Northern Ireland) Craig Cathcart
- (Northern Ireland) Jonny Evans
- (Scotland) Phil Bardsley
- (Scotland) David Gray
- (Togo) Souleymane Mamam

== See also ==
- Club of Pioneers
- Royal Antwerp F.C. in European football
