= 2020–21 Royale Union Saint-Gilloise season =

Royale Union Saint-Gilloise
2020–21 season
- Owner: Tony Bloom
- Chairman: Alex Muzio
- Manager: Felice Mazzù
- Stadium: Stade Joseph Marien
- First Division B: 1st (promoted)
- Belgian Cup: Seventh round
- Top goalscorer: League: Dante Vanzeir (19); All: Dante Vanzeir (21)
- Biggest win: Union Saint-Gilloise 6–0 Club NXT
- Biggest defeat: Union Saint-Gilloise 0–5 Anderlecht
Home colours	Away colours

The 2020–21 season was the 124th season in the history of Royale Union Saint-Gilloise and the club's sixth consecutive season in the second division of Belgian football.

== Players ==
=== First-team squad ===
As of 3 August 2020

Note: Flags indicate national team as defined under FIFA eligibility rules; some limited exceptions apply. Players may hold more than one non-FIFA nationality.

No.	Pos.	Nation	Player
3	DF	ENG	Alex Cochrane (on loan from Brighton)
4	DF	DEN	Jonas Bager
5	DF	BEL	Anas Hamzaoui
6	MF	DEN	Casper Nielsen
8	MF	GER	Marcel Mehlem
9	FW	GER	Deniz Undav
11	MF	BEL	Mathias Fixelles
12	DF	BEL	Sébastien Pocognoli
13	FW	BEL	Dante Vanzeir
14	FW	GUI	Ibrahima Bah
16	DF	ENG	Christian Burgess
17	MF	MLT	Teddy Teuma
19	DF	BEL	Guillaume François

No.	Pos.	Nation	Player
20	MF	BEL	Senne Lynen
21	GK	BEL	Lucas Pirard
23	FW	ISL	Aron Sigurðarson
24	DF	BUL	Edisson Jordanov
26	GK	BEL	Adrien Saussez
33	GK	BEL	Tibo Herbots
43	MF	SLO	Nik Lorbek
44	DF	BEL	Siebe Van der Heyden
49	GK	LUX	Anthony Moris
59	DF	MAR	Ismaël Kandouss
94	MF	MAD	Loïc Lapoussin
96	FW	FRA	Brighton Labeau

== Transfers ==
=== Im ===
Date	Name	Moving from	Fee	Note
3 February 2020	Abdelmounaim Boutouil	ASFAR	Undisclosed	
7 April 2020	Deniz Undav	Meppen	Undisclosed	
23 May 2020	Senne Lynen	Telstar	Undisclosed	
9 June 2020	Tibo Herbots	Sint-Truiden	Undisclosed	
2 July 2020	Charlie Brown	Chelsea	Loan	(Note: Brown was already on loan from Chelsea to Union SG during the second half of the 2019–20 season. All parties agreed to extend the loan deal with one more season.)
7 July 2020	Christian Burgess	Portsmouth	Undisclosed	
30 July 2020	Loïc Lapoussin	Virton	Undisclosed	
30 July 2020	Anthony Moris	Virton	Undisclosed	
30 July 2020	Dante Vanzeir	Genk	Undisclosed	(Note: Vanzeir was on loan from Genk to Mechelen during the 2019–20 season. The loan ended and Vanzeir was now sold to Union SG.)
11 August 2020	Guillaume François	Virton	Undisclosed	

=== Out ===
Date	Name	Moving to	Fee	Note
29 May 2020	Sigurd Hauso Haugen	Aalesund	Undisclosed	
10 June 2020	Pietro Perdichizzi	Westerlo	Undisclosed	
12 June 2020	Soufiane El Banouhi	Deinze	Free	
19 June 2020	Roman Ferber	Francs Borains	Loan	
31 July 2020	Kevin Kis	Lommel	Undisclosed	
3 August 2020	Serge Tabekou	Excel Mouscron	Free	

== Pre-season and friendlies ==
Win Draw Loss

15 July 2020 Friendly	Genk (Belgium)	3–1	(Belgium) Union Saint-Gilloise	Genk, Belgium
17:00 CEST (UTC+2)	Paintsil 21', 43'; Dæhli 33'	Report	Undav 49'	Stadium: Luminus Arena; Attendance: 0

18 July 2020 Friendly	Eupen (Belgium)	0–2	(Belgium) Union Saint-Gilloise	Eupen, Belgium
16:00 CEST (UTC+2)				Stadium: Stade Communal

25 July 2020 Friendly	Oostende (Belgium)	1–2	(Belgium) Union Saint-Gilloise	Oudenburg, Belgium
16:00 CEST (UTC+2)				Stadium: Sportterrein Ter Beke

1 August 2020 Friendly	Excel Mouscron (Belgium)	0–2	(Belgium) Union Saint-Gilloise	Mouscron, Belgium
16:00 CEST (UTC+2)				Stadium: Stade Le Canonnier

5 August 2020 Friendly	Lens (France)	1–3	(Belgium) Union Saint-Gilloise	Billy-Montigny, France
15:00 CEST (UTC+2)	Jean (yellow card) 50'; Oudjani 77'	Report	Hamzaoui 53'; Nielsen 59'; Undav 65'	Stadium: Les Carabiniers Billy-Montigny; Attendance: 0

13 January 2021 Friendly	Union Saint-Gilloise (Belgium)	4–4	(Belgium) Genk	Forest, Belgium
13:30 CET (UTC+1)	Burgess 41'; Lynen 45'; Undav 58'; Vanzeir 60' (pen.)	Report	Németh 11', 66'; Geusens 62' (pen.), 70' (pen.)	Stadium: Stade Joseph Marien

16 January 2021 Friendly	Anderlecht (Belgium)	0–1	(Belgium) Union Saint-Gilloise	Brussels, Belgium
14:00 CET (UTC+1)		Report	Vanzeir 27'	Stadium: RSCA Football Academy

== Competitions ==
=== Overall record ===
Competition	First match	Last match	Starting round	Final position	Record							
Competition	First match	Last match	Starting round	Final position	Pld	W	D	L	GF	GA	GD	Win %
First Division B	21 August 2020	25 April 2021	Matchday 1	Winners	28	22	4	2	69	24	+45	78.57
Belgian Cup	11 October 2020	11 February 2021	Fifth round	Seventh round	3	2	0	1	6	6	+0	66.67
Total					31	24	4	3	75	30	+45	77.42

Source: Soccerway

=== Belgian First Division B ===
==== League table ====
Pos	Team	Pld	W	D	L	GF	GA	GD	Pts	Qualification
1	Union SG (C, P)	28	22	4	2	69	24	+45	70	Promotion to the 2021–22 Belgian First Division A
2	Seraing (O, P)	28	16	4	8	54	37	+17	52	Qualification to Promotion play-off
3	Lommel	28	13	4	11	49	47	+2	43	
4	Westerlo	28	10	13	5	41	30	+11	43	
5	Deinze	28	10	9	9	45	46	−1	39	

Source: Belgian First Division B
Rules for classification: 1) Points; 2) Matches won; 3) Goal difference; 4) Goals scored; 5) Away goals scored; 6) Away matches won; 7) Play-off.
(C) Champions; (O) Play-off winners; (P) Promoted

==== Results summary ====
Overall								Home						Away					
Pld	W	D	L	GF	GA	GD	Pts	W	D	L	GF	GA	GD	W	D	L	GF	GA	GD
28	22	4	2	69	24	+45	70	12	2	0	39	13	+26	10	2	2	30	11	+19

==== Results by round ====
Round	1	2	3	4	5	6	7	8	9	10	11	12	13	14	15	16	17	18	19	20	21	22	23	24	25	26	27	28
Ground	A	H	A	H	A	H	A	H	A	H	H	A	H	A	H	A	A	H	H	A	H	A	H	A	H	A	A	H
Result	W	D	D	W	L	W	W	W	W	W	W	L	W	W	W	W	W	W	W	W	W	W	W	D	W	W	W	D
Position																												

A = Away; H = Home; W = Win; D = Draw; L = Loss

==== Matches ====
21 August 2020 1	Deinze	0–2	Union Saint-Gilloise	Deinze
19:00 CEST (UTC+2)				Stadium: Burgemeester Van de Wielestadion

30 August 2020 2	Union Saint-Gilloise	0–0	Westerlo	Forest
16:00 CEST (UTC+2)				Stadium: Stade Joseph Marien; Referee: Frederik Geldhof

13 September 2020 3	Club NXT	1–1	Union Saint-Gilloise	Lokeren
16:00 CEST (UTC+2)				Stadium: Daknamstadion

19 September 2020 4	Union Saint-Gilloise	3–2	Seraing	Forest
20:45 CEST (UTC+2)				Stadium: Stade Joseph Marien; Referee: Lothar D'hondt

26 September 2020 5	RWDM47	3–1	Union Saint-Gilloise	Molenbeek
20:45 CEST (UTC+2)				Stadium: Edmond Machtens Stadium

4 October 2020 6	Union Saint-Gilloise	4–2	Lommel	Forest
18:30 CEST (UTC+2)				Stadium: Stade Joseph Marien

18 October 2020 7	Lierse Kempenzonen	0–2	Union Saint-Gilloise	Lier
18:30 CEST (UTC+2)				Stadium: Herman Vanderpoortenstadion

25 October 2020 8	Union Saint-Gilloise	6–0	Club NXT	Forest
18:30 CEST (UTC+2)				Stadium: Stade Joseph Marien

31 October 2020 9	Westerlo	1–4	Union Saint-Gilloise	Westerlo
18:30 CEST (UTC+2)				Stadium: Het Kuipje

8 November 2020 10	Union Saint-Gilloise	3–0	Deinze	Forest
18:30 CEST (UTC+2)				Stadium: Stade Joseph Marien

22 November 2020 11	Union Saint-Gilloise	2–1	RWDM47	Forest
18:30 CEST (UTC+2)				Stadium: Stade Joseph Marien

29 November 2020 12	Seraing	1–0	Union Saint-Gilloise	Seraing
18:30 CEST (UTC+2)				Stadium: Stade du Pairay

5 December 2020 13	Union Saint-Gilloise	5–0	Lierse Kempenzonen	Forest
18:30 CEST (UTC+2)				Stadium: Stade Joseph Marien

13 December 2020 14	Lommel	0–1	Union Saint-Gilloise	Lommel
18:30 CEST (UTC+2)				Stadium: Soevereinstadion

20 December 2020 15	Union Saint-Gilloise	2–1	Westerlo	Forest
18:30 CEST (UTC+2)				Stadium: Stade Joseph Marien

23 January 2021 16	Deinze	2–4	Union Saint-Gilloise	Deinze
18:30 CEST (UTC+2)				Stadium: Burgemeester Van de Wielestadion

30 January 2021 17	RWDM47	0–2	Union Saint-Gilloise	Molenbeek
18:30 CEST (UTC+2)				Stadium: Edmond Machtens Stadium

5 February 2021 18	Union Saint-Gilloise	2–1	Lierse Kempenzonen	Forest
18:30 CEST (UTC+2)				Stadium: Stade Joseph Marien

14 February 2021 19	Union Saint-Gilloise	3–1	Club NXT	Forest
18:30 CEST (UTC+2)				Stadium: Stade Joseph Marien

19 February 2021 20	Seraing	0–2	Union Saint-Gilloise	Seraing
18:30 CEST (UTC+2)				Stadium: Stade du Pairay

27 February 2021 21	Union Saint-Gilloise	3–2	Lommel	Forest
18:30 CEST (UTC+2)				Stadium: Stade Joseph Marien

5 March 2021 22	Lierse Kempenzonen	1–3	Union Saint-Gilloise	Lier
18:30 CEST (UTC+2)				Stadium: Herman Vanderpoortenstadion

13 March 2021 23	Union Saint-Gilloise	2–1	RWDM47	Forest
18:30 CEST (UTC+2)				Stadium: Stade Joseph Marien

19 March 2021 24	Westerlo	2–2	Union Saint-Gilloise	Westerlo
18:30 CEST (UTC+2)				Stadium: Het Kuipje

3 April 2021 25	Union Saint-Gilloise	2–0	Seraing	Forest
18:30 CEST (UTC+2)				Stadium: Stade Joseph Marien

11 April 2021 26	Lommel	0–2	Union Saint-Gilloise	Lommel
18:30 CEST (UTC+2)				Stadium: Soevereinstadion

16 April 2021 27	Club NXT	0–4	Union Saint-Gilloise	Lokeren
20:00 CEST (UTC+2)				Stadium: Daknamstadion

25 April 2021 28	Union Saint-Gilloise	2–2	Deinze	Forest
18:00 CEST (UTC+2)				Stadium: Stade Joseph Marien; Referee: Laurent Willems

=== Belgian Cup ===
11 October 2020 Fifth round	Union Saint-Gilloise	4–0	Heist	Forest
16:00 CEST (UTC+2)	Sigurðarson 21'; Undav 82'; Vanzeir 84' (pen.); Lapoussin 90'			Stadium: Stade Joseph Marien; Referee: Anthony Letellier

2 February 2021 Sixth round	Union Saint-Gilloise	2–1	Excel Mouscron	Forest
18:00 CET (UTC+1)	Mehlem (red card) 64'; Vanzeir 79'; Teuma (yellow card) 84'; Nielsen 90+2'	Report	Bakić 30'; Gueye (yellow card) 59'; Onana (yellow card) 59'	Stadium: Stade Joseph Marien; Attendance: 0

11 February 2021 Seventh round	Union Saint-Gilloise	0–5	Anderlecht	Forest
20:45 CET (UTC+1)		Report	Nmecha 16', 57'; Mukairu 61'; Diaby 71' (pen.), 82'	Stadium: Stade Joseph Marien; Attendance: 0
