= 2021–22 Royale Union Saint-Gilloise season =

Union Saint-Gilloise
2021–22 season
- Owner: Tony Bloom
- Chairman: Alex Muzio
- Manager: Felice Mazzù
- Stadium: Stade Joseph Marien
- First Division A: 2nd
- Belgian Cup: Sixth round
- Top goalscorer: League: Deniz Undav (26); All: Deniz Undav (27)
- Highest home attendance: 7,000 (vs. RFC Seraing, 16 October 2021)
- Lowest home attendance: 3,200 (vs. Club Brugge, 1 August 2021)
- Biggest win: 1–7 (vs. KV Oostende)
- Biggest defeat: 1–3 (vs. KV Mechelen, 22 August 2021); 0–2 (vs. Club Brugge, 8 May 2022)
Home colours	Away colours	Third colours
- All statistics correct as of 22 May 2022.

The 2021–22 season was the 124th season in the existence of Royale Union Saint-Gilloise and the club's first season back in the top flight of Belgian football since the 1973. In addition to the domestic league, Royale Union Saint-Gilloise also participated in this season's edition of the Belgian Cup, where they reached the sixth round, being knocked out by KV Mechelen.

== Players ==
=== First-team squad ===
As of 31 January 2022

Note: Flags indicate national team as defined under FIFA eligibility rules; some limited exceptions apply. Players may hold more than one non-FIFA nationality.

No.	Pos.	Nation	Player
2	DF	NED	Bart Nieuwkoop
4	DF	DEN	Jonas Bager
6	MF	DEN	Casper Nielsen
7	DF	ENG	Matthew Sorinola
8	MF	CIV	Jean Thierry Lazare (on loan from Charleroi)
9	FW	GER	Deniz Undav (on loan from Brighton)
11	FW	ESP	Álex Millán (on loan from Villarreal)
13	FW	BEL	Dante Vanzeir
16	DF	ENG	Christian Burgess
17	MF	MLT	Teddy Teuma
18	MF	JPN	Kaoru Mitoma (on loan from Brighton)
19	DF	BEL	Guillaume François
20	MF	BEL	Senne Lynen

No.	Pos.	Nation	Player
21	GK	BEL	Lucas Pirard
22	MF	ANG	Pedro Lubamba
23	MF	ESP	Cameron Puertas
24	MF	BEL	Ilyes Ziani
25	MF	FRA	Damien Marcq
28	DF	JPN	Koki Machida (on loan from Kashima Antlers)
33	GK	BEL	Tibo Herbots
44	DF	BEL	Siebe Van der Heyden
49	GK	LUX	Anthony Moris
59	DF	MAR	Ismaël Kandouss
64	MF	POL	Kacper Kozłowski (on loan from Brighton)
94	FW	MAD	Loïc Lapoussin
—	MF	ITA	Lorenzo Paolucci

=== Out on loan ===
Note: Flags indicate national team as defined under FIFA eligibility rules; some limited exceptions apply. Players may hold more than one non-FIFA nationality.

No.	Pos.	Nation	Player
—	GK	BEL	Kerian Atheba (at Diegem Sport)
—	DF	BEL	Anas Hamzaoui (at Virton)

No.	Pos.	Nation	Player
—	MF	BEL	Lucas Defise (at Helmond Sport)
—	MF	ENG	Marcel Lewis (at Accrington Stanley)

== Transfers ==
=== In ===
Pos	Player	Transferred from	Fee	Date	Source
DF	(Netherlands) Bart Nieuwkoop	(Netherlands) Feyenoord	Free transfer	1 July 2021	
MF	(England) Matthew Sorinola	(England) MK Dons	Free transfer	1 July 2021	
MF	(England) Marcel Lewis	(England) Chelsea F.C. Under-23s	Free transfer	1 July 2021	
GK	(Belgium) Lucas Pirard	(Belgium) Waasland-Beveren	Undisclosed fee	1 July 2021	
MF	(Italy) Lorenzo Paolucci	(Italy) Reggina	Undisclosed fee	1 July 2021	
MF	(Ivory Coast) Jean Thierry Lazare	(Belgium) RSC Charleroi	Loan	1 July 2021	
FW	(Belgium) Roman Ferber	(Belgium) Francs Borains	Loan return	1 July 2021	
FW	(Uruguay) Felipe Avenatti	(Belgium) Standard Liège	Loan	2 July 2021	
MF	(Belgium) Damien Marcq	(Belgium) Zulte Waregem	Free transfer	7 July 2021	
FW	(Japan) Kaoru Mitoma	(England) Brighton & Hove Albion	Loan	11 August 2021	

=== Out ===
Pos	Player	Transferred to	Fee	Date	Source
MF	(Belgium) Mathias Fixelles	(Belgium) Kortrijk	Free transfer	1 July 2021	
MF	(Germany) Marcel Mehlem	(Germany) SC Paderborn	Free transfer	1 July 2021	
DF	(Belgium) Sébastien Pocognoli	Retired	Free	1 July 2021	
DF	(Bulgaria) Edisson Jordanov	(Belgium) Westerlo	Free transfer	7 July 2021	
FW	(Belgium) Roman Ferber	(Belgium) RFC Mandel United	Free transfer	22 July 2021	
MF	(Slovenia) Nik Lorbek	(Slovenia) Mura	Undisclosed fee	23 July 2021	
DF	(Morocco) Abdelmounaim Boutouil	(Morocco) SCC Mohammédia	Undisclosed fee	1 August 2021	
FW	(France) Brighton Labeau	(Switzerland) Stade Lausanne Ouchy	Free transfer	3 August 2021	
DF	(Belgium) Anas Hamzaoui	(Belgium) Royal Excel Mouscron	Loan	5 August 2021	
FW	(Iceland) Aron Sigurðarson	(Denmark) AC Horsens	Undisclosed fee	9 August 2021	
FW	(Belgium) Ibrahima Bah	(Spain) Racing Santander	Free transfer	28 August 2021	
GK	(Belgium) Kerian Atheba	(Belgium) Diegem Sport	Loan	30 September 2021	

== Pre-season and friendlies ==
Win Draw Loss Fixtures

19 June 2021 Friendly	Tempo Overijse (Belgium)	0–5	(Belgium) Union Saint-Gilloise	Belgium
16:00 CEST (UTC+2)

23 June 2021 Friendly	Heist (Belgium)	1–3	(Belgium) Union Saint-Gilloise	Belgium
19:30 CEST (UTC+2)

26 June 2021 Friendly	Zulte Waregem (Belgium)	0–4	(Belgium) Union Saint-Gilloise	Belgium
16:00 CEST (UTC+2)

30 June 2021 Friendly	Standard Liège (Belgium)	0–0	(Belgium) Union Saint-Gilloise	Belgium
18:00 CEST (UTC+2)

6 July 2021 Friendly	Union Saint-Gilloise (Belgium)	6–2	(Belgium) Deinze	Belgium
14:00 CEST (UTC+2)

9 July 2021 Friendly	Lens (France)	0–1	(Belgium) Union Saint-Gilloise	France
15:00 CEST (UTC+2)

14 July 2021 Friendly	Union Saint-Gilloise (Belgium)	1–1	(France) Valenciennes	Belgium
18:00 CEST (UTC+2)

17 July 2021 Friendly	Amiens (France)	3–4	(Belgium) Union Saint-Gilloise	France
16:00 CEST (UTC+2)

31 July 2021 Friendly	Jong AZ (Netherlands)	6–1	(Belgium) Union Saint-Gilloise	Netherlands
11:30 CEST (UTC+2)
Note: The match was played in two 45 minutes halves and two 25 minutes halves.

== Competitions ==
=== Overall record ===
Competition	First match	Last match	Starting round	Final position	Record							
Competition	First match	Last match	Starting round	Final position	Pld	W	D	L	GF	GA	GD	Win %
First Division A	25 July 2021	22 May 2022	Matchday 1	2nd	40	26	6	8	83	32	+51	65.00
Belgian Cup	29 August 2021	26 October 2021	Fifth round	Sixth round	2	1	0	1	8	2	+6	50.00
Total					42	27	6	9	91	34	+57	64.29

Last updated: 22 May 2022
Source: Soccerway

=== First Division A ===
==== League table ====
Pos	Team	Pld	W	D	L	GF	GA	GD	Pts	Qualification or relegation
1	Union SG	34	24	5	5	78	27	+51	77	Qualification for the Europa Conference League and Play-offs I (Note: The regular season winners will qualify for the 2022–23 UEFA Europa Conference League if they do not qualify for the 2022–23 UEFA Champions League in the playoffs.)
2	Club Brugge (C)	34	21	9	4	72	37	+35	72	Qualification for the Play-offs I
3	Anderlecht	34	18	10	6	72	36	+36	64	Qualification for the Play-offs I
4	Antwerp	34	19	6	9	55	38	+17	63	Qualification for the Play-offs I
5	Gent	34	18	8	8	56	30	+26	62	Qualification for the Play-offs II

Source: Jupiler Pro League (in Dutch), Soccerway
Rules for classification: 1) Points; 2) Matches won; 3) Goal difference; 4) Goals scored; 5) Away matches won; 6) Away goal difference; 7) Away goals scored; 8) Play-off.
(C) Champions

==== Results summary ====
Overall								Home						Away					
Pld	W	D	L	GF	GA	GD	Pts	W	D	L	GF	GA	GD	W	D	L	GF	GA	GD
34	24	5	5	78	27	+51	77	10	3	4	32	14	+18	14	2	1	46	13	+33

Last updated: 10 April 2022.
Source: Jupiler Pro League

==== Results by round ====
Round	1	2	3	4	5	6	7	8	9	10	11	12	13	14	15	16	17	18	19	20	21	22	23	24	25	26	27	28	29	30	31	32	33	34
Ground	A	H	A	H	A	H	A	H	H	A	H	A	A	H	A	H	A	H	A	H	H	A	H	A	H	A	H	A	H	A	A	H	A	H
Result	W	L	W	W	L	W	D	W	L	W	W	W	W	W	W	L	W	W	W	W	D	W	W	D	W	W	L	W	D	W	W	D	W	W
Position	2	7	1	1	4	1	2	2	5	3	1	1	1	1	1	1	1	1	1	1	1	1	1	1	1	1	1	1	1	1	1	1	1	1

Updated to match(es) played on 10 April 2022. Source: Jupiler Pro League
A = Away; H = Home; W = Win; D = Draw; L = Loss

==== Matches ====
The league fixtures were announced on 8 June 2021.

25 July 2021 1	Anderlecht	1–3	Union Saint-Gilloise	Anderlecht
18:30 CEST (UTC+2)	Verschaeren 45+2'; Hoedt (yellow card) 66'; Murillo (yellow card) 90+4'; Amuzu (yellow card) 90+5'	Report	Undav 20', 62'; François (yellow card) 50'; Lapoussin (yellow card) 52'; Lazare 73'; Avenatti (yellow card) 80'	Stadium: Constant Vanden Stock Stadium; Attendance: 6,000; Referee: Kevin Van Damme

1 August 2021 2	Union Saint-Gilloise	0–1	Club Brugge	Brussels
13:30 CEST (UTC+2)	Avenatti (yellow card) 37'; Van der Heyden (yellow card) 80'	Report	Nsoki (yellow card) 82'; Sobol 84'; Pérez (yellow card) 90'	Stadium: Stade Joseph Marien; Attendance: 3,200; Referee: Wim Smet

7 August 2021 3	Beerschot	0–3	Union Saint-Gilloise	Antwerp
16:15 CEST (UTC+2)	Noubissi (yellow card) 49'; Van den Bergh (yellow card) 90+4'	Report	Undav 14', 50'; Teuma (yellow card) 43'; Lapoussin 54'; Kandouss (yellow card) 84'; Marcq (yellow card) 88'	Stadium: Olympisch Stadion; Attendance: 3,000; Referee: Jan Boterberg

14 August 2021 4	Union Saint-Gilloise	2–0	Kortrijk	Brussels
16:15 CEST (UTC+2)	Vanzeir 9'; Lynen 52'	Report	Palaversa (yellow card) 10'; Derijck (yellow card) 15'; Sainsbury (yellow card) 39'; Rougeaux (yellow card) 43'; Chevalier (yellow card) 54'; Fixelles (red card) 64'; Moreno (yellow card) 83'	Stadium: Stade Joseph Marien; Attendance: 4,500; Referee: Wesli De Cremer

22 August 2021 5	KV Mechelen	3–1	Union Saint-Gilloise	Mechelen
21:00 CEST (UTC+2)	Costa (yellow card) 8'; Cuypers 13'; Schwed 55'; Shved (yellow card) 64'; Storm 77'	Report	Vanzeir 1', (yellow card) 69'; Sorinola (yellow card) 91'; Nieuwkoop (yellow card) 93'	Stadium: AFAS-stadion Achter de Kazerne; Attendance: 12,652; Referee: Bert Put

28 August 2021 6	Union Saint-Gilloise	4–0	Standard Liège	Brussels
20:45 CEST (UTC+2)	Nielsen 23', (yellow card) 75'; Vanzeir 39', 52', 71'	Report	Peeters (yellow card) 22'; Al Dakhil (yellow card) 53'; Rafia (yellow card) 70'; Amallah (yellow card) 87'; Klauss (yellow card) 91'	Stadium: Stade Joseph Marien; Attendance: 6,255; Referee: Jonathan Lardot

12 September 2021 7	Genk	1–1	Union Saint-Gilloise	Genk
21:00 CEST (UTC+2)	Lucumí (yellow card) 43'; Onuachu 74'	Report	Burgess (yellow card) 28'; Bager (red card) 72'; Undav 95'	Stadium: Luminus Arena; Attendance: 14,000; Referee: Erik Lambrechts

18 September 2021 8	Union Saint-Gilloise	2–1	Zulte Waregem	Brussels
18:30 CEST (UTC+2)	Kandouss (yellow card) 18'; Undav 53'; Sorinola 85', (yellow card) 89'	Report	Sissako (red card) 9'; Srarfi (yellow card) 15'; Gano 78'; Pletinckx (yellow card) 91'	Stadium: Stade Joseph Marien; Attendance: 6,000; Referee: Christof Dierick

26 September 2021 9	Union Saint-Gilloise	1–2	Antwerp	Brussels
13:30 CEST (UTC+2)	Lapoussin (yellow card) 38'; Undav 43'; Kandouss (yellow card) 46'; Nieuwkoop (yellow card) 57'	Report	Frey (yellow card) 34', (goal) 70'; Fischer (yellow card) 71'; Benson 79', (yellow card) 87'	Stadium: Stade Joseph Marien; Attendance: 6,800; Referee: Nicolas Laforge

2 October 2021 10	Cercle Brugge	0–3	Union Saint-Gilloise	Brugge
18:30 CEST (UTC+2)	Lopes (yellow card) 22'; Martín (yellow card) 81'	Report	Teuma (yellow card) 24'; Vanzeir 60', 79'; Van der Heyden (yellow card) 70'; Lapoussin 84'	Stadium: Jan Breydelstadion; Attendance: 2,850; Referee: Wesli De Cremer

16 October 2021 11	Union Saint-Gilloise	4–2	RFC Seraing	Brussels
16:15 CEST (UTC+2)	Lazare (yellow card) 16' (yellow-red card) 45'; Mitoma 55', 76', 90'; Vanzeir 66'; Van der Heyden (yellow card) 83'	Report	Jallow 31'; Mikautadze 35'; Jallow (yellow card) 58'; Del Fabro (yellow card) 81'	Stadium: Stade Joseph Marien; Attendance: 7,000; Referee: Nathan Verboomen

23 October 2021 12	Eupen	2–3	Union Saint-Gilloise	Eupen
18:30 CEST (UTC+2)	Kayembe 75'; Agbadou 78'; Maas (yellow card) 97'	Report	Undav 7'; Burgess (yellow card) 21'; Nieuwkoop (yellow card) 23'; Teuma 29'; Undav (yellow card) 68'; Nielsen 79'	Stadium: Kehrwegstadion; Attendance: 2,950; Referee: Bram Van Driessche

31 October 2021 13	Gent	0–2	Union Saint-Gilloise	Gent
21:00 CET (UTC+1)	Kums (yellow card) 43'; Bolat (yellow card) 44'	Report	Vanzeir 7'; Van der Heyden (yellow card) 36'; Undav (yellow card) 41'; Teuma 45'; Mitoma (yellow card) 47'; Nielsen (yellow card) 88'	Stadium: Ghelamco Arena; Attendance: 17,541; Referee: Lawrence Visser

6 November 2021 14	Union Saint-Gilloise	4–0	Charleroi	Brussels
20:45 CET (UTC+1)	Undav 29', 39'; Nieuwkoop 34'; Marcq (yellow card) 67'; Kayembe 78' (o.g.)	Report	Zedadka (yellow card) 53'; Morioka (yellow card) 86'	Stadium: Stade Joseph Marien

21 November 2021 15	Oostende	1–7	Union Saint-Gilloise	Oostende
18:30 CET (UTC+1)	Ambrose 23'; Capon (yellow card) 54'	Report	Undav 5', 16', 59', 80'; Nielsen 30'; Burgess 45+3', 69'	Stadium: Diaz Arena; Referee: Kevin Van Damme

26 November 2021 16	Union Saint-Gilloise	1–3	OH Leuven	Brussels
20:45 CET (UTC+1)	Vanzeir (yellow card) 34'; Mitoma 51'; Nieuwkoop (yellow card) 77'; Sorinola (yellow card) 79'	Report	de Norre 13'; Maertens 40'; Malinov (yellow card) 53'; Mercier (yellow card) 58', (goal) 67'; Özkaçar (yellow card) 62'	Stadium: Stade Joseph Marien; Attendance: 8,100; Referee: Nathan Verboomen

4 December 2021 17	Sint-Truiden	1–2	Union Saint-Gilloise	Sint-Truiden
20:45 CET (UTC+1)	Brüls 63'; Suzuki (yellow card) 65'; Leistner (yellow card) 77'	Report	Nieuwkoop (yellow card) 11'; Undav 32', 73'; Burgess (yellow card) 65'	Stadium: Stadion Stayen; Attendance: 4,238; Referee: Jasper Vergoote

12 December 2021 18	Union Saint-Gilloise	2–0	KV Mechelen	Brussels
16:00 CET (UTC+1)	François (yellow card) 16'; Vanzeir 35'; Nielsen (yellow card) 46'; Teuma 55'; Burgess (yellow card) 69'; Van der Heyden (yellow card) 70'	Report	Mrabti (yellow card) 13'; Van Hoorenbeeck (yellow card) 52'	Stadium: Stade Joseph Marien; Attendance: 8,100; Referee: Christof Dierick

15 December 2021 19	Zulte Waregem	0–2	Union Saint-Gilloise	Waregem
18:45 CET (UTC+1)		Report	Vanzeir 19'; Mitoma (yellow card) 25'; Burgess 39', (yellow card) 50'; Lapoussin (yellow card) 74'; Nieuwkoop (yellow card) 88'	Stadium: Elindus Arena; Attendance: 5,804; Referee: Nicolas Laforge

18 December 2021 20	Union Saint-Gilloise	3–2	Cercle Brugge	Brussels
18:30 CET (UTC+1)	Kandouss (yellow card) 27'; Teuma (yellow card) 45'; Nielsen (yellow card) 49'; Van der Heyden (yellow card) 56'; Mitoma 57'; Nieuwkoop 75'; Daland 90' (o.g.)	Report	Utkus 8'; Matondo 24'; Daland (yellow card) 29'; Somers (yellow card) 68'; Lopes (yellow card) 77'	Stadium: Stade Joseph Marien; Attendance: 7,114; Referee: Jan Boterberg

26 December 2021 21	Union Saint-Gilloise	0–0	Gent	Brussels
18:30 CET (UTC+1)		Report	Hjulsager (yellow card) 21'; De Sart (yellow card) 23'; Bezus (yellow card) 86'	Stadium: Stade Joseph Marien; Referee: Lawrence Visser

15 January 2022 22	RFC Seraing	0–4	Union Saint-Gilloise	Seraing
18:30 CET (UTC+1)	Lahssaini (yellow card) 61'; Galjé (yellow card) 82'	Report	Undav 5', 83' (pen.); Bager (red card) 13'; Vanzeir 26'; Teuma 62' (pen.); Van der Heyden (yellow card) 67'	Stadium: Stade du Pairay; Referee: Wesli De Cremer

23 January 2022 23	Union Saint-Gilloise	2–1	Genk	Brussels
14:00 CET (UTC+1)	Nielsen 27'; Burgess (yellow card) 76'; Vanzeir (yellow card) 84', (goal) 90+10' (pen.); Lazare (yellow card) 90+9'	Report	Onuachu 77' (pen.)	Stadium: Stade Joseph Marien; Referee: Nathan Verboomen

27 January 2022 24	Club Brugge	0–0	Union Saint-Gilloise	Brugge
14:45 CET (UTC+1)	Mata (yellow card) 45+1'	Report	Lazare (yellow card) 41'; Van der Heyden (yellow card) 45+1'; Puertas (yellow card) 89'; Lapoussin (yellow card) 90'	Stadium: Jan Breydel Stadium; Attendance: Closed-Door; Referee: Lawrence Visser

29 January 2022 25	Union Saint-Gilloise	1–0	Anderlecht	Brussels
07:30 CET (UTC+1)	Nielsen 11'	Report		Stadium: Stade Joseph Marien; Attendance: 6,491; Referee: Erik Lambrechts

5 February 2022 26	Antwerp	0–2	Union Saint-Gilloise	Antwerp
14:45 CET (UTC+1)	De Laet (yellow card) 4'; Butez (yellow card) 77'; Frey (yellow card) 90+3'	Report	Van der Heyden (yellow card) 20'; Undav 50', 77', (yellow card) 78'; Moris (yellow card) 90+5'	Stadium: Bosuilstadion; Attendance: 10,000; Referee: Bram Van Driessche

13 February 2022 27	Union Saint-Gilloise	0–1	Sint-Truiden	Brussels
10:00 CET (UTC+1)		Report	Brüls 54' (pen.)	Stadium: Stade Joseph Marien; Attendance: 7,491; Referee: Bert Put

19 February 2022 28	Charleroi	0–3	Union Saint-Gilloise	Charleroi
14:45 CET (UTC+1)		Report	Burgess 4'; Lazare 38'; Millán 90+1'	Stadium: Stade du Pays de Charleroi; Attendance: 7,118; Referee: Nicolas Laforge

26 February 2022 29	Union Saint-Gilloise	0–0	Eupen	Brussels
16:15 CET (UTC+1)		Report		Stadium: Stade Joseph Marien; Attendance: 7,600; Referee: Wesli De Cremer

5 March 2022 30	Kortrijk	2–3	Union Saint-Gilloise	Kortrijk
18:30 CET (UTC+1)	Selemani 8', 76'	Report	Nielsen 13'; Kandouss 67'; Undav 87'	Stadium: Guldensporen Stadion; Attendance: 6,682; Referee: Jan Boterberg

11 March 2022 31	OH Leuven	1–4	Union Saint-Gilloise	Leuven
20:45 CET (UTC+1)	Schrijvers 11' (pen.)	Report	Undav 27', 48', 62' (pen.); Teuma 58'	Stadium: King Power at Den Dreef; Attendance: 7,123; Referee: Jonathan Lardot

18 March 2022 32	Union Saint-Gilloise	1–1	Oostende	Brussels
20:45 CET (UTC+1)	Undav 83'	Report	D'Arpino 9'	Stadium: Stade Joseph Marien; Attendance: 7,850; Referee: Lothar D'hondt

3 April 2022 33	Standard Liège	1–3	Union Saint-Gilloise	Liège
13:30 CEST (UTC+2)	Sissako 24'	Report	Teuma 9'; Nieuwkoop 70'; Nielsen 83'	Stadium: Stade Maurice Dufrasne; Attendance: 21,367; Referee: Nathan Verboomen

10 April 2022 34	Union Saint-Gilloise	5–0	Beerschot	Brussels
18:30 CEST (UTC+2)				Stadium: Stade Joseph Marien
Note: Result awarded due to crowd trouble by Beerschot fans with the result at 0–0.

==== Play-Off I ====
Pos	Team	Pld	W	D	L	GF	GA	GD	Pts	Qualification or relegation	CLU	USG	AND	ANT
1	Club Brugge (C)	6	4	2	0	8	2	+6	50	Qualification for the Champions League group stage	—	1–0	1–1	1–0
2	Union SG	6	2	1	3	5	5	0	46	Qualification for the Champions League third qualifying round	0–2	—	3–1	0–1
3	Anderlecht	6	2	2	2	8	7	+1	40	Qualification for the Europa Conference League third qualifying round	0–0	0–2	—	2–1
4	Antwerp	6	1	1	4	3	10	−7	36	Qualification for the Europa Conference League second qualifying round	1–3	0–0	0–4	—

Source: Jupiler Pro League (in Dutch), Soccerway
Legend: Blue = home team win; Yellow = draw; Red = away team win.
Rules for classification: 1) Points; 2) Points without (possible) half points added due to rounding; 3) Regular season finishing position.
(C) Champions

==== Results summary ====
Overall								Home						Away					
Pld	W	D	L	GF	GA	GD	Pts	W	D	L	GF	GA	GD	W	D	L	GF	GA	GD
6	2	1	3	5	5	0	7	1	0	2	3	4	−1	1	1	1	2	1	+1

Last updated: 22 May 2022.
Source: Jupiler Pro League

==== Results by round ====
Round	1	2	3	4	5	6
Ground	H	A	H	A	A	H
Result	W	D	L	L	W	L
Position	1	1	2	2	2	2

Updated to match(es) played on 22 May 2022. Source: Jupiler Pro League
A = Away; H = Home; W = Win; D = Draw; L = Loss

==== Matches ====
24 April 2022 1	Union Saint-Gilloise	3–1	Anderlecht	Brussels
18:30 CEST (UTC+2)	Nieuwkoop 2'; Vanzeir 12'; Lazare (yellow card) 47'; Mitoma 52'; Bager (yellow card) 90'	Report	Cullen 26', (yellow card) 31'; Murillo (yellow card) 50'; Olsson (yellow card) 90+6'	Stadium: Stade Joseph Marien; Attendance: 8,700; Referee: Jonathan Lardot

1 May 2022 2	Antwerp	0–0	Union Saint-Gilloise	Antwerp
13:30 CEST (UTC+2)	Haroun (yellow card) 39'; De Laet (yellow card) 45+2'; Bataille (yellow card) 58'; Almeida (yellow card) 78'	Report	Nieuwkoop (yellow card) 42'; Bager (yellow card) 57'; Burgess (yellow card) 69'	Stadium: Bosuilstadion; Attendance: 11,781; Referee: Nicolas Laforge

8 May 2022 3	Union Saint-Gilloise	0–2	Club Brugge	Brussels
13:30 CEST (UTC+2)	Teuma (yellow card) 5'; Vanzeir (penalty missed) 55'; Lapoussin (yellow card) 59'; Mitoma (yellow card) 78'; Undav (yellow card) 90+1'	Report	Mata (yellow card) 40'; Odoi (yellow card) 57'; Vanaken 74'; Nsoki (yellow card) 90+1'; Sobol (yellow card) 90+5'; Nusa 90+8'	Stadium: Stade Joseph Marien; Attendance: 9,000; Referee: Lawrence Visser

11 May 2022 4	Club Brugge	1–0	Union Saint-Gilloise	Bruges
20:30 CEST (UTC+2)	Balanta (yellow card) 35'; Moris 65' (o.g.); Mignolet (yellow card) 76'; Buchanan (yellow card) 83' (yellow-red card) 90+3'	Report	Machida (yellow card) 12' (yellow-red card) 59'; Lazare (yellow card) 18'; Nielsen (yellow card) 77'	Stadium: Jan Breydel Stadium; Attendance: 25,856; Referee: Erik Lambrechts

15 May 2022 5	Anderlecht	0–2	Union Saint-Gilloise	Anderlecht
18:30 CEST (UTC+2)		Report	Mitoma 2'; Undav 50'	Stadium: Constant Vanden Stock Stadium; Attendance: 19,000; Referee: Bram van Driessche

22 May 2022 6	Union Saint-Gilloise	0–1	Antwerp	Brussels
18:30 CEST (UTC+2)	Van der Heyden (yellow card) 14'; Undav (yellow card) 74'; Mitoma (yellow card) 82'	Report	Frey 71'; Dwomoh (yellow card) 83'	Stadium: Stade Joseph Marien; Attendance: 8,500; Referee: Jasper Vergoote

=== Belgian Cup ===
21 September 2021 Fifth round	Union Saint-Gilloise	7–0	FC Lebbeke	Brussels
20:30 CEST (UTC+2)	Mitoma 16'; Burgess 53'; Avenatti 57'; Aeyels 60' (o.g.); Undav 82'; Lazare 84'; Teuma 90' (pen.)	Report	Van Damme (yellow card) 49'	Stadium: Stade Joseph Marien

26 October 2021 Sixth round	KV Mechelen	2–1	Union Saint-Gilloise	Mechelen
20:30 CEST (UTC+2)	Shved 16'; Swers (yellow card) 24'; Hairemans 65'; Schoofs (yellow card) 82'		Sorinola (yellow card) 40'; Vanzeir 82', (yellow card) 93'	Stadium: AFAS Stadion; Referee: Arthur Denil

== Statistics ==
=== Squad appearances and goals ===
Last updated on 22 May 2022

No.	Pos	Nat	Player	Total		Belgian Division		Belgian Cup	
No.	Pos	Nat	Player	Apps	Goals	Apps	Goals	Apps	Goals
Goalkeepers
21	GK	(Belgium) BEL	Lucas Pirard	3	0	1	0	2	0
33	GK	(Belgium) BEL	Tibo Herbots	0	0	0	0	0	0
49	GK	(Luxembourg) LUX	Anthony Moris	39	0	39	0	0	0
Defenders
2	DF	(Netherlands) NED	Bart Nieuwkoop	39	4	31+7	4	0+1	0
4	DF	(Denmark) DEN	Jonas Bager	33	0	24+7	0	1+1	0
7	DF	(England) ENG	Matthew Sorinola	16	1	0+14	1	2	0
14	DF	(Belgium) BEL	Noa David Wyns	1	0	0	0	0+1	0
16	DF	(England) ENG	Christian Burgess	36	5	33+1	4	2	1
19	DF	(Belgium) BEL	Guillaume François	25	0	9+15	0	1	0
28	DF	(Japan) JPN	Koki Machida	11	0	8+3	0	0	0
44	DF	(Belgium) BEL	Siebe Van der Heyden	30	0	24+4	0	2	0
59	DF	(Morocco) MAR	Ismaël Kandouss	37	1	30+6	1	1	0
	DF	(Belgium) BEL	Zacarias Antonio	0	0	0	0	0	0
Midfielders
6	MF	(Denmark) DEN	Casper Nielsen	41	7	39	7	1+1	0
8	MF	(Ivory Coast) CIV	Jean Thierry Lazare	36	3	19+15	2	1+1	1
17	MF	(Malta) MLT	Teddy Teuma	40	7	37+1	6	0+2	1
18	MF	(Japan) JPN	Kaoru Mitoma	29	8	16+11	7	1+1	1
20	MF	(Belgium) BEL	Senne Lynen	10	1	7+3	1	0	0
22	MF	(Angola) ANG	Pedro Lubamba	0	0	0	0	0	0
23	MF	(Spain) ESP	Cameron Puertas	9	0	1+8	0	0	0
24	MF	(Belgium) BEL	Ilyes Ziani	4	0	0+4	0	0	0
25	MF	(France) FRA	Damien Marcq	34	0	13+19	0	2	0
64	MF	(Poland) POL	Kacper Kozłowski	9	0	2+7	0	0	0
Forwards
9	FW	(Germany) GER	Deniz Undav	41	27	39	26	0+2	1
11	FW	(Spain) ESP	Álex Millán	8	1	1+7	1	0	0
13	FW	(Belgium) BEL	Dante Vanzeir	36	15	34+1	14	1	1
94	FW	(Madagascar) MAD	Loïc Lapoussin	38	2	33+5	2	0	0
Players who have made an appearance this season but have left the club
10	MF	(England) ENG	Marcel Lewis	1	0	0	0	1	0
11	MF	(Italy) ITA	Lorenzo Paolucci	3	0	0+1	0	2	0
90	FW	(Uruguay) URU	Felipe Avenatti	16	1	0+14	0	2	1

=== Goalscorers ===
As of 4 November 2021

Rank	No.	Pos.	Nat.	Name	Belgian First Division	Belgian Cup	Total
1	13	FW	(Belgium)	Dante Vanzeir	9	1	10
2	9	FW	(Germany)	Deniz Undav	8	1	9
3	18	FW	(Japan)	Kaoru Mitoma	3	1	4
4	17	MF	(Malta)	Teddy Teuma	2	1	3
5	94	MF	(Madagascar)	Loïc Lapoussin	2	0	2
5	6	MF	(Denmark)	Casper Nielsen	2	0	2
5	8	MF	(Ivory Coast)	Jean Thierry Lazare	1	1	2
8	20	MF	(Belgium)	Senne Lynen	1	0	1
8	7	DF	(England)	Matthew Sorinola	1	0	1
8	90	FW	(Uruguay)	Felipe Avenatti	0	1	1
8	16	DF	(England)	Christian Burgess	0	1	1
Own goals					0	1	1
Totals					29	8	37

=== Clean sheets ===
As of 4 November 2021

No.	Player	Belgian First Division	Belgian Cup	Total
49	(Luxembourg) Anthony Moris	5	0	5
21	(Belgium) Lucas Pirard	0	1	1
Total		5	0	6
