= Ilyes Ziani =

Moroccan footballer (born 2003)

Personal information
- Date of birth: 20 June 2003 (age 23)
- Place of birth: Brussels, Belgium
- Height: 1.73 m (5 ft 8 in)
- Position: Midfielder

Team information
- Current team: RWD Molenbeek
- Number: 11

Youth career
- Union SG

Senior career*
Years	Team	Apps	(Gls)
2021–2023	Union SG	6	(0)
2022–2023	→ SL 16 FC (loan)	27	(6)
2023–2024	SL 16 FC	26	(1)
2024	Standard Liège	0	(0)
2024–	RWD Molenbeek	39	(9)

International career^{‡}
2022	Morocco U20	3	(0)
- * Club domestic league appearances and goals as of 20 April 2026 ‡ National team caps and goals as of 18:55, 6 June 2023 (UTC)

Ilyes Ziani (born 20 June 2003) is a professional footballer who plays for Challenger Pro League club RWD Molenbeek. Born in Belgium, he is a youth international for Morocco.

== Club career ==
Coming through the youth ranks of the Royale Union Saint-Gilloise, of which he captained the under-21 side, Ilyes Ziani signed his first professional contract with the club from the Belgian capital on in August 2021.

Ziani made his professional debut for Union SG on the 15 December 2021, replacing Dante Vanzeir during a 2–0 away Division 1A win against Zulte Waregem. The newly promoted team from Saint-Gilles was then enjoying a remarkable spell back in the First Division after 48 years, with Union sitting well on top of the league after the first half of the season.

On 31 May 2023, Ziani signed a two-year contract with Standard Liège after playing for their second team SL16 FC on loan in the previous season.

On 13 August 2024, Ziani moved to RWD Molenbeek on a two-year deal.

== International career ==
Born in Belgium, Ziani is of Moroccan descent. He was called up to the Morocco U20s for a set of friendlies in September 2022.
