= Jonas Bager =

Danish footballer (born 1996)

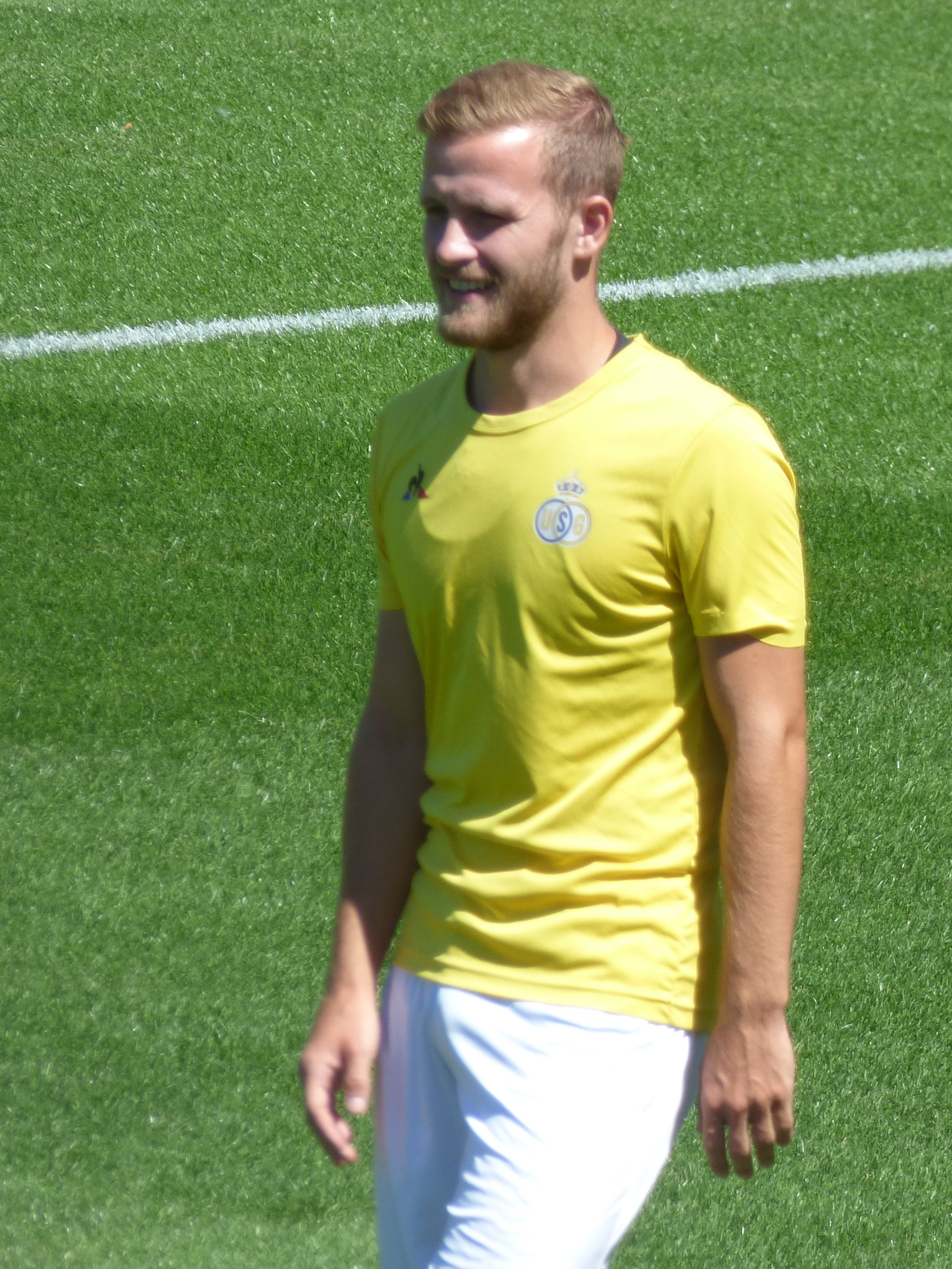
- Bager with Union SG in August 2020

Personal information
- Full name: Jonas Valentin Bager
- Date of birth: 18 July 1996 (age 30)
- Place of birth: Hadsten, Denmark
- Height: 1.82 m (6 ft 0 in)
- Position: Centre-back

Team information
- Current team: IFK Göteborg
- Number: 5

Youth career
- 2002–2006: ØHG
- 2006–2008: HSK Fodbold
- 2008–2013: Randers

Senior career*
Years	Team	Apps	(Gls)
2013–2019	Randers	86	(2)
2019–2022	Union SG	57	(2)
2022–2024	Charleroi	46	(1)
2024–	IFK Göteborg	38	(0)

International career
2011	Denmark U16	1	(0)
2013	Denmark U17	3	(0)
2013–2014	Denmark U18	5	(0)
2014–2015	Denmark U19	8	(0)
2015–2016	Denmark U20	2	(0)
2016–2019	Denmark U21	7	(0)
- * Club domestic league appearances and goals as of 18:56, 19 September 2026 (UTC)

Jonas Valentin Bager (born 18 July 1996) is a Danish professional footballer who plays as a centre-back for Allsvenskan club IFK Göteborg.

== Club career ==
=== Randers ===
Bager is a product of Randers FC's youth academy. In winter 2015 Bager went on a training camp with the first team squad to Spain.

He made his first team debut on 9 July 2015 against Andorran club UE Sant Julià in the UEFA Europa League qualifiers; Randers won 3–0. He came on the pitch in the 76th minute, where he replaced Johnny Thomsen. Later in the same season, Bager also made his debut in the Danish Superliga against FC Nordsjælland on 28 November 2015.

He was officially promoted to the first team in October 2015. Bager's contract was extended in September 2016 until 2020.

=== Union SG ===
In May 2019, Bager signed a three-year contract with Belgian First Division B club Union Saint-Gilloise. He made his debut for the club on 10 August as a substitute in stoppage time for Teddy Teuma in a 1–0 away win over Virton. During his first season at the club, he was mostly a substitute, making 8 total appearances.

In his second season Bager played more, and he scored his first goal for the club on 25 October 2020 in a 6–0 win over Club NXT. As he finished the season with 22 appearances, in which he scored 2 goals – both against Club NXT – Union Saint-Gilloise managed to win promotion to the Belgian First Division A as champions.

On 25 July 2021, Bager made his debut in the Belgian First Division A as a starter, providing an assist for Jean Thierry Lazare in a 3–1 away win over Anderlecht.

=== Sporting Charleroi ===
Bager joined Sporting Charleroi on 13 July 2022, signing a two-year contract with an option for an additional two years. He made his competitive debut for the club on 23 July, the first matchday of the season, coming on as a substitute in the 87th minute for Stefan Knezevic in a 3–1 home win. On 11 February 2023, he scored his first goal for Charleroi, heading home a Damien Marcq corner-kick in a 3–0 league victory against Seraing. He suffered a calf injury in late February 2023, which kept him sidelined for a month, and he returned to practice on 28 March 2023.

=== IFK Göteborg ===
Bager joined Swedish club IFK Göteborg on 16 July 2024, signing a three-and-a-half-year contract.

== International career ==
He has represented Denmark at youth international level from under-16 to under-21.

== Career statistics ==
As of match played 26 February 2023

Appearances and goals by club, season and competition
Club	Season	League			National Cup		Europe		Other		Total	
Club	Season	Division	Apps	Goals	Apps	Goals	Apps	Goals	Apps	Goals	Apps	Goals
Randers	2015–16	Danish Superliga	3	0	1	0	1	0	—		5	0
Randers	2016–17	Danish Superliga	25	0	2	0	—		—		27	0
Randers	2017–18	Danish Superliga	23	1	1	0	—		1	0	25	1
Randers	2018–19	Danish Superliga	35	1	0	0	—		—		36	1
Randers	Total		86	2	4	0	1	0	1	0	93	2
Union SG	2019–20	Challenger Pro League	6	0	2	0	—		—		8	0
Union SG	2020–21	Challenger Pro League	20	2	2	0	—		—		22	2
Union SG	2021–22	Belgian Pro League	31	0	2	0	—		—		33	0
Union SG	Total		57	2	6	0	0	0	0	0	63	2
Sporting Charleroi	2022–23	Belgian Pro League	22	1	1	0	—		—		23	1
Career total			165	5	11	0	1	0	1	0	178	5

== Honours ==
Union SG

- Challenger Pro League: 2020–21
