= Siebe Van der Heyden =

Belgian footballer

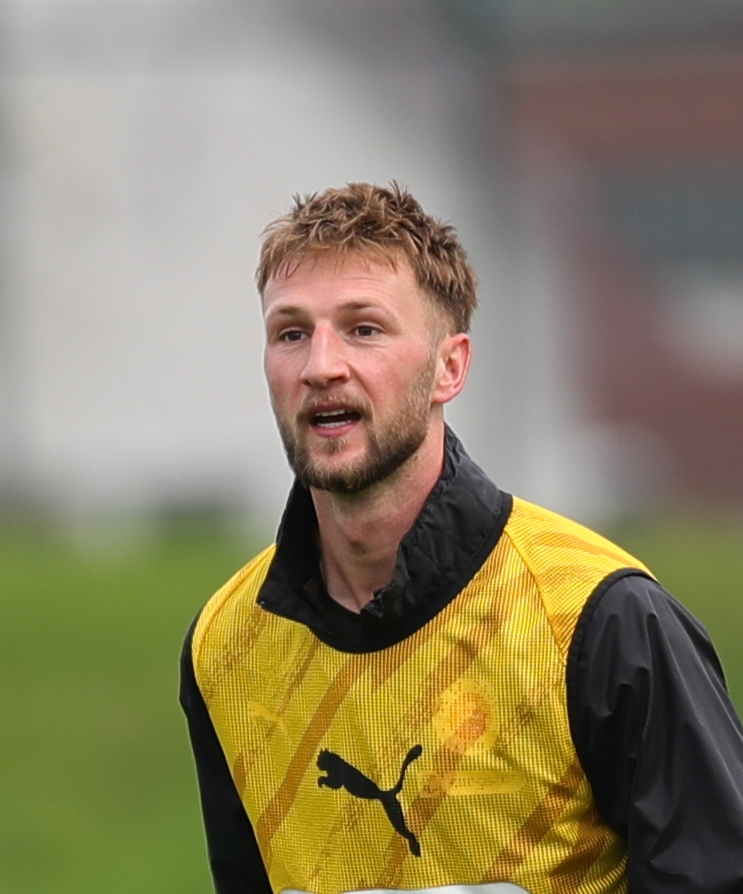
- Van der Heyden in 2025

Personal information
- Date of birth: 30 May 1998 (age 28)
- Place of birth: Denderleeuw, Belgium
- Height: 1.85 m (6 ft 1 in)
- Position: Centre back

Team information
- Current team: Gent
- Number: 44

Youth career
- 2004-2005: SK Denderhoutem
- 2005-2008: Dender
- 2008–2009: Club Brugge
- 2009–2016: Anderlecht

Senior career*
Years	Team	Apps	(Gls)
2016–2018	Oostende	2	(1)
2018–2019	FC Eindhoven	32	(1)
2019–2023	Union SG	97	(3)
2023–2025	Mallorca	8	(0)
2025	→ FC St. Pauli (loan)	13	(1)
2025–	Gent	44	(2)

International career^{‡}
2022–	Belgium	1	(0)
- * Club domestic league appearances and goals as of 25 October 2026 ‡ National team caps and goals as of 29 July 2025

Siebe Van der Heyden (born 30 May 1998) is a Belgian professional footballer who plays as a centre back for the Belgian Pro League side Gent and the Belgium national team.

== Club career ==
=== Early career ===
Van der Heyden started with SK Denderhoutem in 2004, before moving to Dender. He also played for the youth academies of Club Brugge and Anderlecht. He was denied a professional contract at Anderlecht despite regularly starting for their youth team but signed his first professional contract at Belgian Pro League team Oostende in the summer of 2016, where he signed a two-year contract. Van der Heyden made his Belgian First Division A debut for Oostende on 21 May 2017 against Anderlecht, coming on as a substitute in the 88th minute for David Rozehnal. Van der Heyden struggled to break into the first team however, and was released at the end of his contract in 2018.

=== Eindhoven ===
Van der Heyden was offered a contract with FC Knokke, but instead, on 30 July 2018, moved to the Netherlands, signing with FC Eindhoven for one year with an option to extend the contract for one more year following a trial. He made his debut on 17 August 2018, where he lost 2–1 against Jong PSV. He also scored in the same match, the only goal he would score that season. Over the season, he would be a regular starter for David Nascimento's side.

=== Union SG ===
On 10 July 2019, he returned to his home country in the following year, signing a three year old contract with an option to extend for another year with Challenger Pro League team Union SG. He made his debut with the team on 4 August 2019 in a 3–0 win against Roeselare. He scored his first goal for Union SG on 30 January 2021 against Molenbeek. His one-year extension was activated on 11 August 2021, with another option for a one-year extension.

=== Mallorca ===
On 19 July 2023, Van der Heyden signed a five-year contract with La Liga side Mallorca.

==== Loan to St. Pauli ====
On 30 January 2025, Van der Heyden joined St. Pauli in Germany on loan until the end of the 2024–25 season.

=== Gent ===
On 25 July 2025, he joined Pro League side Gent, signing a contract until the summer of 2028.

== International career ==
On 18 March 2022, Van der Heyden was named in the senior Belgium squad for the two friendly matches on 26 and 29 March the same year, respectively against Republic of Ireland and Burkina Faso. He debuted against the former opponent, playing the full match in a 3–0 victory.

== Career statistics ==
=== Club ===
As of match played 25 October 2026

Appearances and goals by club, season and competition
Club	Season	League			National cup		Europe		Other		Total	
Club	Season	Division	Apps	Goals	Apps	Goals	Apps	Goals	Apps	Goals	Apps	Goals
Oostende	2016–17	Belgian First Division A	1	0	0	0	—		—		1	0
Oostende	2017–18	Belgian First Division A	1	0	0	0	—		—		1	0
Oostende	Total		2	0	0	0	0	0	0	0	2	0
FC Eindhoven	2018–19	Eerste Divisie	32	1	1	0	—		—		33	1
Union SG	2019–20	Proximus League	13	0	2	0	—		—		15	0
Union SG	2020–21	Proximus League	24	2	3	0	—		—		27	2
Union SG	2021–22	Belgian First Division A	28	0	2	0	—		—		30	0
Union SG	2022–23	Belgian First Division A	32	1	3	0	10 (Note: Two appearances in UEFA Champions League, eight appearances in UEFA Europa League)	0	—		45	1
Union SG	Total		97	3	10	0	10	0	0	0	117	3
Mallorca	2023–24	La Liga	6	0	5	0	—		—		11	0
Mallorca	2024–25	La Liga	2	0	0	0	—		0	0	2	0
Mallorca	Total		8	0	5	0	—		0	0	13	0
St. Pauli (loan)	2024–25	Bundesliga	13	1	—		—		—		13	1
Gent	2025–26	Belgian Pro League	35	2	3	3	0	0	—		38	5
Gent	2026–27	Belgian Pro League	9	0	0	0	8 (Note: Appearances in UEFA Conference League)	0	—		17	0
Gent	Total		44	2	3	3	8	0	—		55	5
Career total			196	7	19	3	18	0	0	0	233	10

=== International ===
As of match played 29 March 2022

Appearances and goals by national team and year
National team	Year	Apps	Goals
Belgium	2022	1	0
Total		1	0

== Honours ==
K.V. Oostende

- Belgian Cup runner-up: 2016-17

Union SG

- Challenger Pro League: 2020-21
- Belgian First Division A runner-up: 2021-22
