= Ismaël Kandouss =

Moroccan footballer (born 1997)

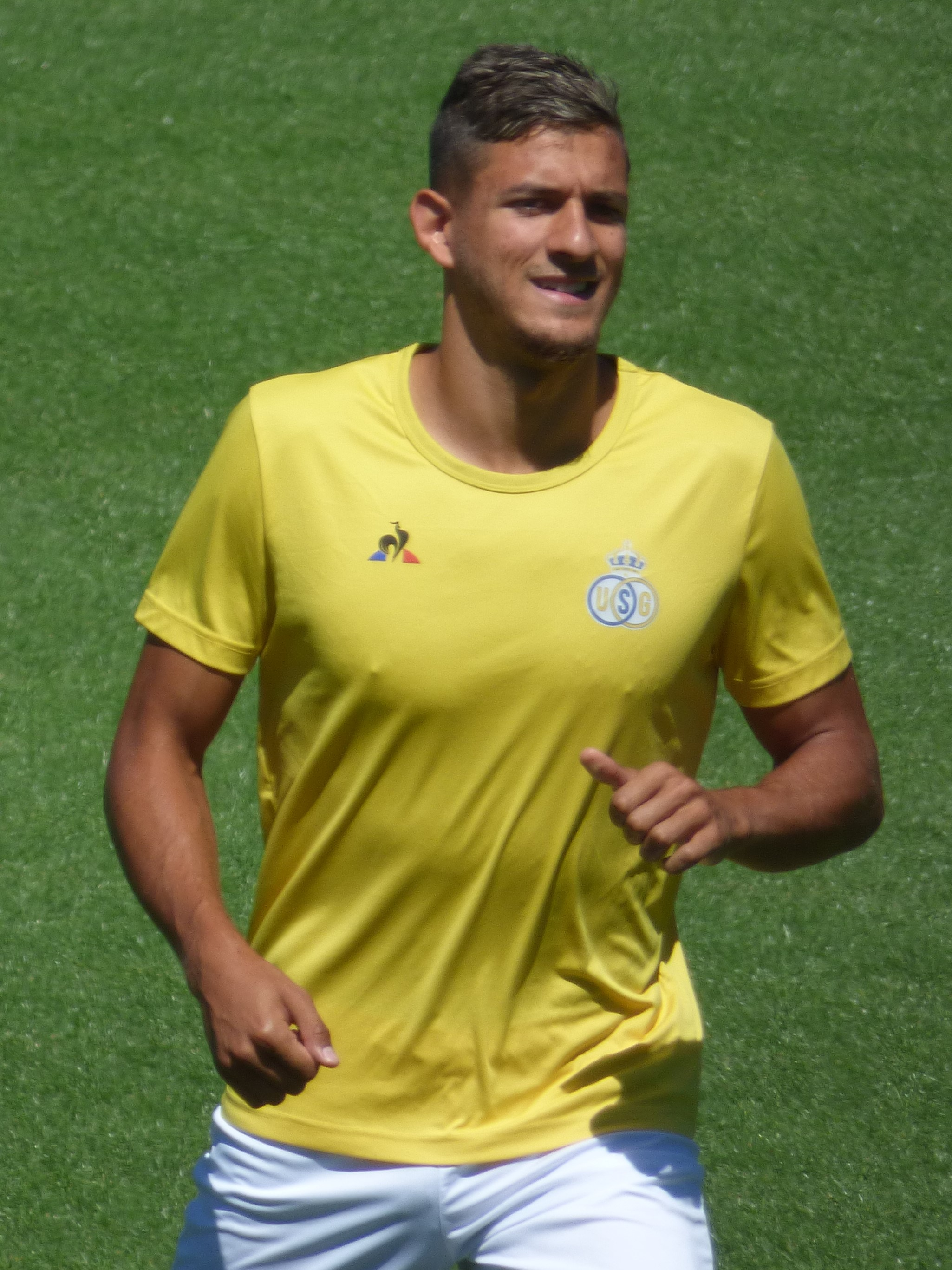
- Kandouss in 2020

Personal information
- Date of birth: 12 November 1997 (age 29)
- Place of birth: Lille, France
- Height: 1.92 m (6 ft 4 in)
- Position: Defender

Team information
- Current team: RS Berkane
- Number: 27

Senior career*
Years	Team	Apps	(Gls)
2017–2018	Dunkerque II	23	(0)
2018–2019	Dunkerque	16	(0)
2019–2023	Union SG	129	(5)
2023–2025	Gent	35	(2)
2024–2025	→ Al-Orobah (loan)	29	(2)
2025–	RS Berkane	10	(0)

International career^{‡}
2019–2020	Morocco U23	3	(0)
2023–	Morocco	1	(0)
- * Club domestic league appearances and goals as of 00:12, 25 January 2026 (CET) ‡ National team caps and goals as of 05:35, 13 June 2023 (UTC)

Ismaël Kandouss (Arabic: اسماعيل قندوس; born 12 November 1997) is a professional footballer who plays as a defender for RS Berkane. Born in France, he plays for the Morocco national team.

== Club career ==
After starting his career at Dunkerque, Kandouss joined Union Saint-Gilloise in January 2019. He made his professional debut with Saint-Gilloise in a 2-1 Belgian First Division B win over Leuven on 20 January 2019. He played with them in the 2022–23 UEFA Europa League, reaching the quarterfinals.

On 12 July 2023, Kandouss signed a four-year contract with Gent. He played with them in the 2023–24 UEFA Europa Conference League.

On 1 September 2024, Kandouss signed for Saudi Pro League club Al-Orobah on a season-long loan deal.

On 25 August 2025, Kandouss joined reigning Botola Pro champions RS Berkane on a three-year contract.

== International career ==
Kandouss was a youth international for Morocco until he joined the senior squad in 2023.

== Personal life ==
He was born in Lille, France, to a Moroccan father from Taza and a French mother. He holds French and Moroccan nationalities.

== Career statistics ==
=== Club ===
As of match played 1 August 2024

Appearances and goals by club, season and competition
Club	Season	League			National Cup		Europe		Other		Total	
Club	Season	Division	Apps	Goals	Apps	Goals	Apps	Goals	Apps	Goals	Apps	Goals
Dunkerque II	2017–18	National 3	20	0	—		—		—		20	0
Dunkerque II	2018–19	National 3	3	0	—		—		—		3	0
Dunkerque II	Total		23	0	—		—		—		23	0
Dunkerque	2017–18	National	5	0	0	0	—		—		5	0
Dunkerque	2018–19	National	11	0	1	0	—		—		12	0
Dunkerque	Total		16	0	1	0	—		—		17	0
Union SG	2018–19	Belgian First Division B	15	0	2	0	—		—		17	0
Union SG	2019–20	Belgian First Division B	25	2	2	0	—		—		22	2
Union SG	2020–21	Belgian First Division B	15	0	2	0	—		—		22	0
Union SG	2021–22	Belgian First Division A	36	1	1	0	—		—		36	1
Union SG	2022–23	Belgian Pro League	33	1	4	0	10	0	—		47	1
Union SG	Total		124	4	11	0	10	0	—		145	4
Gent	2023–24	Belgian Pro League	33	2	3	0	12	0	1	0	49	2
Gent	2024–25	Belgian Pro League	1	0	—		1	0	—		2	0
Gent	Total		34	2	3	0	13	0	1	0	51	2
Career total			197	6	15	0	23	0	1	0	236	6

== Honours ==
Union Saint-Gilloise

- Challenger Pro League: 2020–21

RS Berkane

- Botola Pro runner-up: 2025–26
- CAF Super Cup runner-up: 2025

Individual

- Belgian Lion Award runner-up: 2022, 2023
