= Christian Burgess =

English footballer (born 1991)

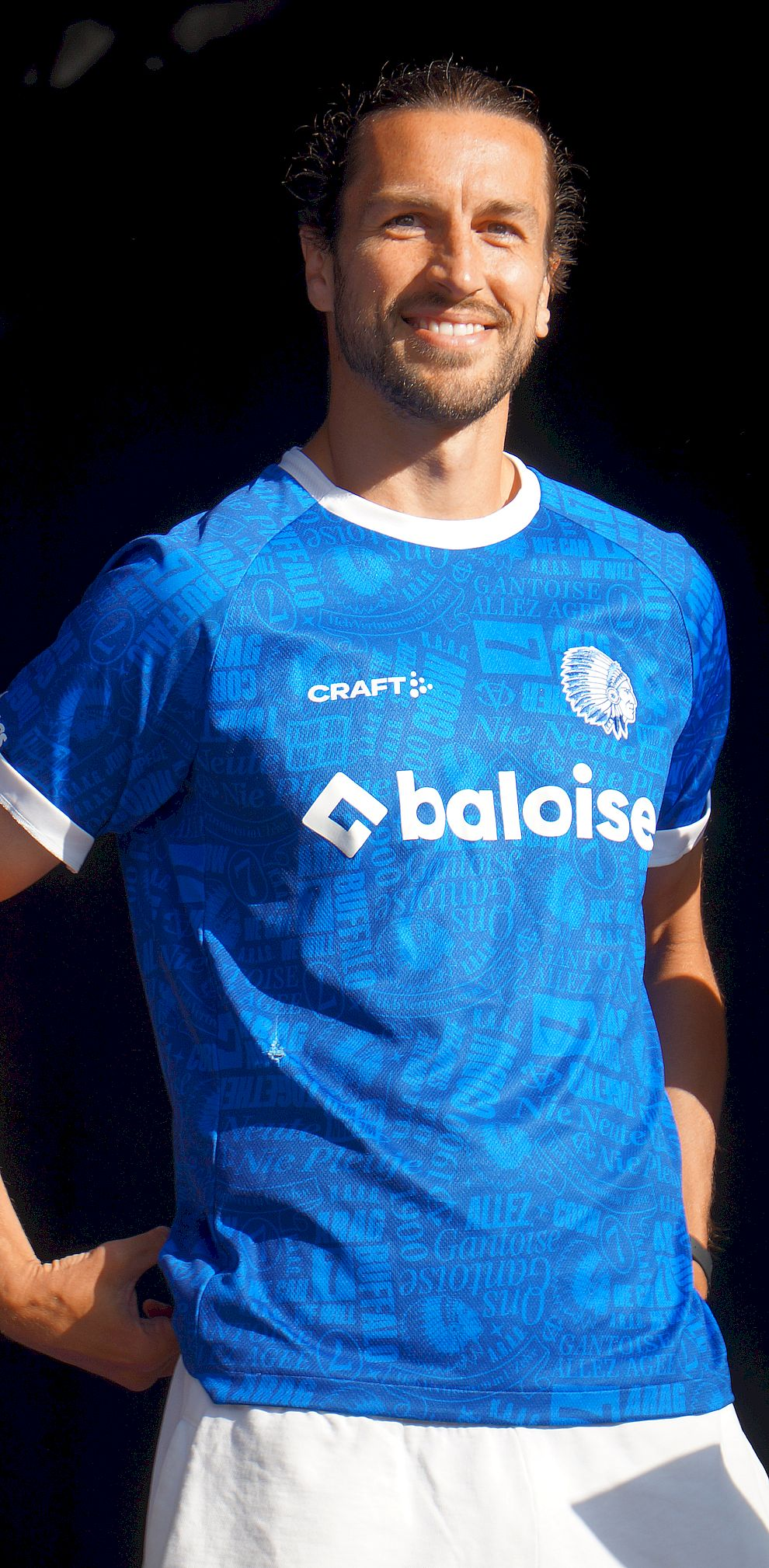
- Burgess for KAA Gent in 2026

Personal information
- Full name: Christian Albert Elliot Burgess
- Date of birth: 7 October 1991 (age 35)
- Place of birth: Barking, London, England
- Height: 6 ft 5 in (1.96 m)
- Position: Centre-back

Team information
- Current team: Gent

Youth career
- Arsenal
- West Ham United
- Bishop's Stortford

Senior career*
Years	Team	Apps	(Gls)
2013–2014	Middlesbrough	1	(0)
2013–2014	→ Hartlepool United (loan)	41	(0)
2014	→ Peterborough United (loan)	1	(0)
2014–2015	Peterborough United	30	(3)
2015–2020	Portsmouth	173	(10)
2020–2026	Union SG	200	(15)
2026–	Gent	9	(1)
- * Club domestic league appearances and goals as of 25 October 2026

Christian Albert Elliot Burgess (born 7 October 1991) is an English professional footballer who plays as a centre-back for Belgian Pro League club Gent.

== Career ==
=== Youth career ===
Burgess began his career at Arsenal's academy and after he was released he went on to play with the youth and reserves teams at non-League Bishop's Stortford before deciding to study history at the University of Birmingham. Whilst in his second year of university, Burgess earned a trial at Middlesbrough through a coach of the university's first team.

=== Middlesbrough ===
He impressed at Boro and he signed a two-year contract in July 2012. He made his professional debut on 4 May 2013 in a 2–0 defeat away at Sheffield Wednesday.

=== Hartlepool United ===
He joined Hartlepool United on loan in August 2013. The loan deal was extended until the end of the season in December. Burgess scored his first goal in professional football in a 5–0 win for Hartlepool in a Football League Trophy game against Bradford City in September 2013.

=== Peterborough United ===
On 19 August 2014, Burgess signed on a month's loan for Peterborough United. He completed a single game on loan, a 2–1 home defeat by Sheffield United, before completing a permanent transfer on 21 August 2014. Burgess signed a four-year contract for an undisclosed fee.

=== Portsmouth ===
On 25 June 2015, Burgess signed for south coast club Portsmouth as part of the summer overhaul at the club by new manager Paul Cook.

He went on to make his debut on 11 July 2015, in a pre-season friendly against local Conference South club Havant & Waterlooville.

During the 2015–16 season, in which Portsmouth reached the play-off semi-finals, Burgess made 43 appearances in all competitions, partnered in most games by either Matthew Clarke or Adam Webster.

Following a successful first campaign for Pompey, during which he established himself as the club's first-choice centre back, Burgess began the 2016–17 season as one of the team's central figures. In total, Burgess made 45 appearances and scored four goals over the course of the season, as Portsmouth won the League Two title. Burgess, along with teammate and fellow defender Enda Stevens, was named in the League Two team of the year; a reward for their part in Portsmouth's league-best defensive record.

Burgess was awarded the EFL League One Player of the Month award in January 2020 and won the award for Portsmouth Player of the Season in the same year.

=== Union SG ===
Burgess turned down a contract extension at Portsmouth and on 7 July 2020 joined Belgian First Division B club Union SG, signing a three-year deal with the option of an additional year. He scored his first goal for the club in a 3–1 victory against Club NXT. At the end of the season Union were promoted, securing the second league title of Burgess' career. Burgess was named in the Division 1B Team of the Season.

On 21 November 2021, Burgess scored twice in a 7–1 victory against Oostende. The team finished first in the regular season of their return campaign to the Belgian Pro League, although they ultimately finished runners-up after the championship play-offs.

The following year, Union again qualified for the championship play-offs after finishing level on points with Genk. In a close title race on the final day, Burgess and Union conceded three late goals against Club Brugge, allowing Antwerp to claim the title by a single point. During the season, Burgess missed only three league matches and earned the nickname "Air Burgey" in recognition of his aerial ability.

In the 2023–24 season, Burgess helped Union win the Belgian Cup, the first major cup title of his career. Union also mounted another challenge for the league championship, ultimately finishing second in the 2023–24 Belgian Pro League, one point behind Club Brugge. In the 2024–25 season, Burgess helped Union secure their first Belgian league title in 90 years. He made his UEFA Champions League debut in a 3–1 away win over PSV Eindhoven on 16 September 2025. He added a second Belgian Cup winner's medal in the 2025–26 season. Following the conclusion of the 2025–26 campaign, Burgess announced that he would leave Union Saint-Gilloise at the expiration of his contract after six seasons with the club.

=== KAA Gent ===
On 15 June 2026, Burgess joined fellow Belgian Pro League side KAA Gent on a free transfer, signing a two-year deal.

== Personal life ==
He earned a BA Hons in history part-time at Teesside University, having previously studied history at University of Birmingham before his move to Middlesbrough. Burgess is also a vegan.

== Career statistics ==
As of match played 25 October 2026

Appearances and goals by club, season and competition
Club	Season	League			National cup (Note: Includes FA Cup, Belgian Cup)		League cup (Note: Includes Football League Cup)		Europe		Other		Total	
Club	Season	Division	Apps	Goals	Apps	Goals	Apps	Goals	Apps	Goals	Apps	Goals	Apps	Goals
Middlesbrough	2012–13	Championship	1	0	0	0	0	0	—		—		1	0
Middlesbrough	2013–14	Championship	0	0	—		—		—		—		0	0
Middlesbrough	2014–15	Championship	0	0	—		—		—		—		0	0
Middlesbrough	Total		1	0	0	0	0	0	—		—		1	0
Hartlepool United (loan)	2013–14	League Two	41	0	2	0	1	0	—		2 (Note: Appearance(s) in Football League Trophy)	1	46	1
Peterborough United	2014–15 (Note: Burgess made one appearance for Peterborough United on loan from Middlesbrough before signing permanently in the summer transfer window)	League One	30	3	2	2	0	0	—		1	0	33	5
Portsmouth	2015–16	League Two	37	2	4	0	0	0	—		2 (Note: Appearances in League Two play-offs)	0	43	2
Portsmouth	2016–17	League Two	44	4	1	0	0	0	—		0	0	45	4
Portsmouth	2017–18	League One	35	0	1	0	1	0	—		2 (Note: Appearances in EFL Trophy)	0	39	0
Portsmouth	2018–19	League One	25	1	2	0	1	1	—		10 (Note: Eight appearances in EFL Trophy, two appearances in League One play-offs)	0	38	2
Portsmouth	2019–20	League One	32	3	5	1	3	0	—		5 (Note: Three appearances in EFL Trophy, two appearances in EFL League One play-offs)	0	45	4
Portsmouth	Total		173	10	13	1	5	1	—		19	0	210	12
Union SG	2020–21	Belgian First Division B	27	2	3	0	—		—		—		30	2
Union SG	2021–22	Belgian Pro League	34	4	2	1	—		—		—		36	5
Union SG	2022–23	Belgian Pro League	37	5	4	0	—		12 (Note: Two appearances in UEFA Champions League, ten in UEFA Europa League)	1	—		53	6
Union SG	2023–24	Belgian Pro League	37	1	4	0	—		11 (Note: Eight appearances in UEFA Europa League, three in UEFA Conference League)	1	—		52	2
Union SG	2024–25	Belgian Pro League	30	1	3	0	—		9 (Note: Appearances in UEFA Europa League)	0	—		42	1
Union SG	2025–26	Belgian Pro League	35	2	5	0	—		8 (Note: Appearances in UEFA Champions League)	0	1 (Note: Appearance in Belgian Super Cup)	0	49	2
Union SG	Total		200	15	21	1	—		40	2	1	0	262	18
KAA Gent	2026–27	Belgian Pro League	9	0	1	0	—		8 (Note: Appearances in UEFA Conference League)	1	—		18	1
Career total			454	25	39	4	6	1	48	3	23	1	570	34

== Honours ==
Portsmouth

- EFL League Two: 2016–17
- EFL Trophy: 2018–19

Union SG

- Belgian Pro League: 2024–25
- Challenger Pro League: 2020–21
- Belgian Cup: 2023–24, 2025–26
- Belgian Super Cup: 2024

Individual

- PFA Team of the Year: 2016–17 League Two
- PFA EFL League One Player of the Month: January 2020
- Portsmouth Player of the Season: 2019–20
- Belgian First Division B Team of the Season: 2020–21
