= Casper Nielsen =

Danish footballer (born 1994)

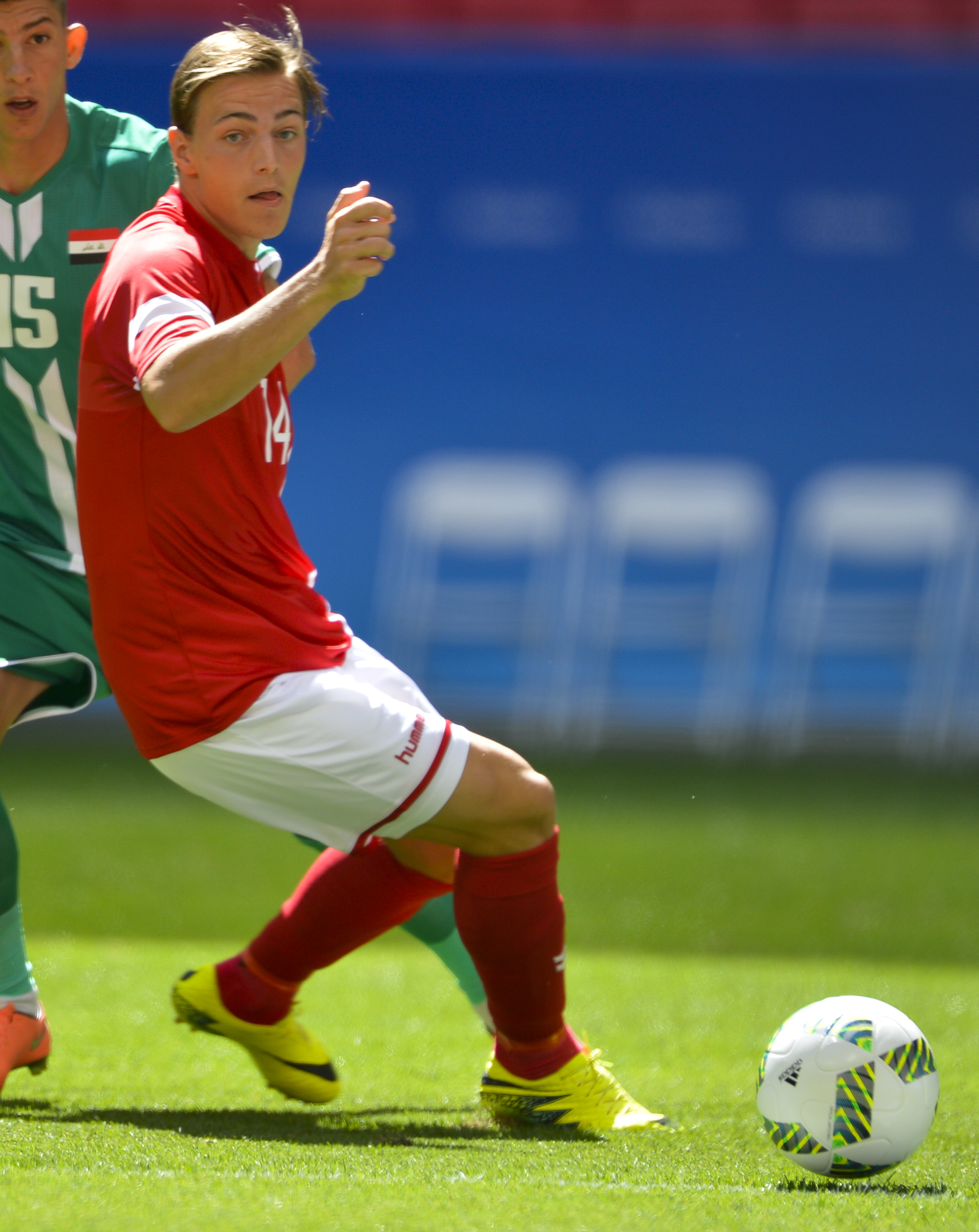
- Nielsen at the 2016 Summer Olympics

Personal information
- Full name: Casper Mørup Nielsen
- Date of birth: 29 April 1994 (age 32)
- Place of birth: Esbjerg, Denmark
- Height: 1.82 m (6 ft 0 in)
- Position: Midfielder

Team information
- Current team: Standard Liège
- Number: 94

Youth career
- Esbjerg fB

Senior career*
Years	Team	Apps	(Gls)
2013–2017	Esbjerg fB	90	(1)
2017–2019	Odense	73	(5)
2019–2022	Union SG	92	(18)
2022–2025	Club Brugge	86	(11)
2025–	Standard Liège	26	(5)

International career
2009–2010	Denmark U-16	5	(1)
2010	Denmark U-17	3	(0)
2013	Denmark U-20	5	(1)
2015–2017	Denmark U-21	22	(4)
- * Club domestic league appearances and goals as of 31 May 2026

Casper Mørup Nielsen (born 29 April 1994) is a Danish professional footballer who plays as a midfielder for Belgian Pro League club Standard Liège.

He is the son of former Esbjerg top scorer Henrik "Ismand" Nielsen.

== Club career ==
=== Esbjerg ===
Nielsen signed his first professional contract with Esbjerg in June 2009 only 15 years old. A few months later, he went on a trial with English Premier League club Manchester City.

His contract was prolonged in January 2013, where he officially was moved up into the Esbjerg first team squad. Later in the season, he made his professional debut on 12 May 2013 in a 2–0 win against Copenhagen.

=== Odense ===
In January 2017, Nielsen signed with Danish Superliga team Odense BK on a 3 1/2-year contract.

=== Union SG ===
On 4 July 2019, Nielsen joined Belgian club Union SG.

=== Club Brugge ===
On 17 July 2022, Club Brugge announced that they had reached an agreement to transfer Nielsen from Union SG. Nielsen signed a four-year contract to keep him with Club through 2026. He scored his first goal for Club on 14 August 2022, the winner in a 3–0 victory over OH Leuven.

=== Standard Liège ===
On 2 July 2025, Nielsen signed a three-year contract with Standard Liège.

== International career ==
He was called up to the senior Denmark squad for friendly matches against the Netherlands and Serbia on 26 and 29 March 2022, respectively.

== Career statistics ==
As of match played 4 May 2025

Appearances and goals by club, season and competition
Club	Season	League			National cup		Europe		Other		Total	
Club	Season	Division	Apps	Goals	Apps	Goals	Apps	Goals	Apps	Goals	Apps	Goals
Esbjerg	2012–13	Danish Superliga	1	0	1	0	—		—		2	0
Esbjerg	2013–14	Danish Superliga	15	1	1	0	3 (Note: Appearances in UEFA Europa League)	0	—		19	1
Esbjerg	2014–15	Danish Superliga	26	1	1	0	4	1	—		31	2
Esbjerg	2015–16	Danish Superliga	31	0	4	0	—		—		35	0
Esbjerg	2016–17	Danish Superliga	17	0	0	0	—		—		17	0
Esbjerg	Total		90	2	7	0	7	1	0	0	104	3
OB	2016–17	Danish Superliga	13	1	1	0	—		—		14	1
OB	2017–18	Danish Superliga	31	1	1	0	—		—		32	1
OB	2018–19	Danish Superliga	29	3	3	2	—		—		32	5
OB	Total		73	5	5	2	0	0	0	0	78	7
Union SG	2019–20	Challenger Pro League	26	7	2	0	—		—		28	7
Union SG	2020–21	Challenger Pro League	27	4	3	1	—		—		30	5
Union SG	2021–22	Belgian Pro League	39	7	2	0	—		—		41	7
Union SG	Total		92	18	7	1	0	0	0	0	99	19
Club Brugge	2022–23	Belgian Pro League	36	9	2	0	8 (Note: Appearances in UEFA Champions League)	0	—		46	9
Club Brugge	2023–24	Belgian Pro League	31	2	4	0	13 (Note: Appearances in UEFA Conference League)	1	—		48	3
Club Brugge	2024–25	Belgian Pro League	14	0	4	1	6	1	1 (Note: Appearance in Belgian Super Cup)	0	25	2
Club Brugge	Total		81	11	10	0	27	2	1	0	119	14
Career total			336	36	29	3	34	3	1	0	400	42

== Honours ==
Club Brugge

- Belgian Pro League: 2023–24
- Belgian Cup: 2024–25
