= Henrik Nielsen (footballer, born 1971) =

Danish footballer

Personal information
- Date of birth: 15 November 1971 (age 54)
- Place of birth: Denmark
- Height: 1.82 m (6 ft 0 in)
- Position: Striker

Senior career*
Years	Team	Apps	(Gls)
- Kvaglund IF
–1999	Esbjerg IF 92		
2000–2003	Esbjerg fB	93	(30)
2003–2004	Kvaglund IF	45	(23)
- * Club domestic league appearances and goals

Henrik "Ismand" Nielsen (born 15 November 1971) is a Danish former professional footballer who most notably had a three-year spell at Esbjerg fB as a striker.

== Career ==
Being a prolific goalscorer in the Danish Serie-1, the sixth tier in Denmark, for local clubs Kvaglund IF and Esbjerg IF 92, he joined Danish Superliga club Esbjerg on a trial in early 2000, at the age of 28, as Esbjerg were in desperate need of strikers.

He scored in his debut match for the club in a 2–1 home defeat against Viborg FF in the Danish Superliga after nine minutes of play. Only a month later, he signed a new contract with Esbjerg, which saw him go from being part-time to a full-time professional. In his first whole season for Esbjerg, he became the club's top scorer in the Danish 1st Division, amassing 15 goals and playing an important part in the club's promotion to the best Danish tier.

Following the arrival of young striker Tommy Bechmann, Nielsen saw his playing time limited, and he decided to retire from professional football, when his contract with Esbjerg expired in the summer of 2003. He decided to join his old low-tier club Kvaglund IF playing as an amateur, but lacking motivation saw him retire only a year later.

== Personal life ==
Prior to becoming a full-time professional for Esbjerg, he was working as an ice cream man for Hjem-IS. Still in this profession in his first months at Esbjerg, he saw himself earning the nickname "Ismand" (Iceman). After his retirement from professional football, Esbjerg helped him find a full-time job at a local company through a sponsor.

Nielsen is the father of current Club Brugge midfielder Casper Nielsen.
