= Anthony Moris =

Luxembourgish footballer

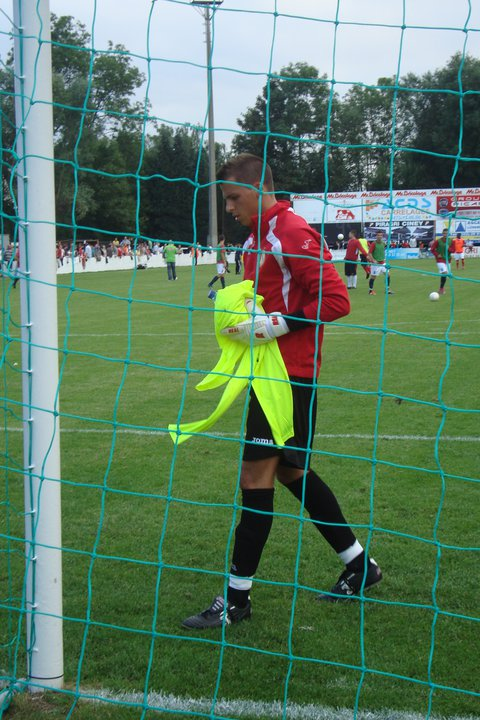
- Moris with Standard Liège

Personal information
- Full name: Anthony Christian Moris
- Date of birth: 29 April 1990 (age 36)
- Place of birth: Arlon, Belgium
- Height: 1.86 m (6 ft 1 in)
- Position: Goalkeeper

Team information
- Current team: Al-Khaleej
- Number: 49

Youth career
- Standard Liège

Senior career*
Years	Team	Apps	(Gls)
2008–2014	Standard Liège	9	(0)
2014	→ Sint-Truiden (loan)	4	(0)
2015–2018	Mechelen	17	(0)
2018–2020	Virton	54	(0)
2020–2025	Union SG	184	(0)
2025–	Al-Khaleej	33	(0)

International career^{‡}
2008	Belgium U18	4	(0)
2008–2009	Belgium U19	4	(0)
2011	Belgium U21	1	(0)
2014–	Luxembourg	88	(0)
- * Club domestic league appearances and goals as of 20 May 2026 ‡ National team caps and goals as of 16 November 2026

Anthony Christian Moris (born 29 April 1990) is a professional footballer who plays as a goalkeeper for Saudi Pro League club Al-Khaleej. Born in Belgium, he plays for the Luxembourg national team.

== Club career ==
Moris played his first friendly match for Standard Liège against R.F.C. Amay where he kept a clean sheet.

He was the third-choice goalkeeper for Standard Liège for the 2008–09 season. He was contracted until 2010 with Standard and extended his contract three more years.

In January 2014, Moris was loaned out to then-Belgian First Division B club Sint-Truiden. He made his competitive debut for the club on 1 February 2014 in a 1–1 home draw with Roeselare, coming on as a 79th-minute substitute for Davy Schollen. He played in just eight more competitive matches during the duration of his loan, with three in the league and five in the playoffs. Moris kept four clean sheets during the loan, including one in his eleven-minute stint on his debut.

In early 2015, Moris was picked up by K.V. Mechelen. He made his league debut for the club on 5 April 2015, coming on as an 88th-minute substitute for Wouter Biebauw in a 4–1 home victory over Waasland-Beveren. On 25 April 2015, in just his third match for the club, Moris suffered a cruciate ligament rupture in his left knee, ending his first season with the club prematurely. In October 2016, in a league match against Anderlecht, Moris tore his meniscus. On 25 March 2017, in a World Cup qualifying match against France, Moris tore his cruciate ligament again, this time in his right knee.

On 18 July 2018, Moris and Mechelen mutually parted ways. The next day, he signed for Belgian First Amateur Division club R.E. Virton on a free transfer. He made his league debut for the club on 1 September 2018, playing all ninety minutes of a 3–0 away victory over Dessel Sport.

Moris signed a three-year deal with Union Saint-Gilloise on 30 July 2020. Having appeared in 26 of the team's 28 league games, Moris helped Union to win promotion by becoming champion of the Belgian First Division B. In their first season in the top flight since 1973, Moris played games but one, keeping 17 clean sheets and finishing second.

The Luxembourger remained Union's starting goalkeeper throughout the 2022–23 season, narrowly missing out on the league title on the final matchday. He also played in ten Europa League fixtures, reaching the quarter finals. In the 2024–25 season, he captained the team to the league title, Union's first since the 1934–35 season.

On 16 July 2025, Union Saint-Gilloise confirmed that Moris had departed the club after five seasons. He subsequently signed with Saudi Pro League side Al-Khaleej.

== International career ==
Anthony has represented several youth national teams of Belgium.

Moris who has a Luxembourgish father, declared himself available to play for Luxembourg in late 2013, thus gaining eligibility to play for Luxembourg national team, the d‘Roud Léiwen (Red Lions).

In February 2014, Moris was called up for the first time into the Luxembourg national football team that drew with Cape Verde 0–0. He has been a regular member of the squad for the past six seasons.

== Career statistics ==
=== Club ===
As of match played 20 May 2026

Appearances and goals by club, season and competition
Club	Season	League			National cup (Note: Includes Belgian Cup)		Continental		Other		Total	
Club	Season	Division	Apps	Goals	Apps	Goals	Apps	Goals	Apps	Goals	Apps	Goals
Standard Liège	2011–12	Belgian Pro League	7	0	2	0	1 (Note: Appearance in UEFA Europa League)	0	—		10	0
Standard Liège	2012–13	Belgian Pro League	2	0	2	0	—		0	0	4	0
Standard Liège	2013–14	Belgian Pro League	0	0	0	0	0	0	0	0	0	0
Standard Liège	Total		9	0	4	0	1	0	0	0	14	0
Sint-Truidense (loan)	2013–14	Belgian First Division B	4	0	—		—		5	0	9	0
Mechelen	2014–15	Belgian Pro League	4	0	0	0	—		—		4	0
Mechelen	2015–16	Belgian Pro League	1	0	0	0	—		—		1	0
Mechelen	2016–17	Belgian Pro League	12	0	0	0	—		—		12	0
Mechelen	2017–18	Belgian Pro League	0	0	0	0	—		—		0	0
Mechelen	Total		17	0	0	0	—		—		17	0
Virton	2018–19	Belgian First Amateur Division	30	0	2	0	—		—		32	0
Virton	2019–20	Belgian First Division B	24	0	0	0	—		—		24	0
Virton	Total		54	0	2	0	—		—		56	0
Union SG	2020–21	Belgian First Division B	26	0	2	0	—		—		28	0
Union SG	2021–22	Belgian Pro League	39	0	0	0	—		—		39	0
Union SG	2022–23	Belgian Pro League	40	0	4	0	12 (Note: Two appearances in UEFA Champions League, ten appearances in UEFA Europa League)	0	—		56	0
Union SG	2023–24	Belgian Pro League	39	0	4	0	10 (Note: Two appearances in UEFA Champions League, eight appearances in UEFA Europa League)	0	—		53	0
Union SG	2024–25	Belgian Pro League	40	0	1	0	12 (Note: Two appearances in UEFA Champions League, ten appearances in UEFA Europa League)	0	—		52	0
Union SG	Total		184	0	11	0	34	0	—		229	0
Al-Khaleej	2025–26	Saudi Pro League	33	0	3	0	—		—		36	0
Career total			300	0	20	0	35	0	5	0	360	0

=== International ===
As of match played 16 November 2026

Appearances and goals by national team and year
National team	Year	Apps	Goals
Luxembourg	2014	2	0
Luxembourg	2015	0	0
Luxembourg	2016	5	0
Luxembourg	2017	2	0
Luxembourg	2018	8	0
Luxembourg	2019	11	0
Luxembourg	2020	6	0
Luxembourg	2021	10	0
Luxembourg	2022	9	0
Luxembourg	2023	10	0
Luxembourg	2024	8	0
Luxembourg	2025	8	0
Luxembourg	2026	9	0
Total		88	0

== Honours ==
Union Saint-Gilloise

- Belgian Pro League: 2024–25
- Belgian Cup: 2023–24
- Belgian Super Cup: 2024
- Belgian First Division B: 2020–21
- Jules Pappaert Cup: 2021, 2022
