= Loïc Lapoussin =

Malagasy footballer (born 1996)

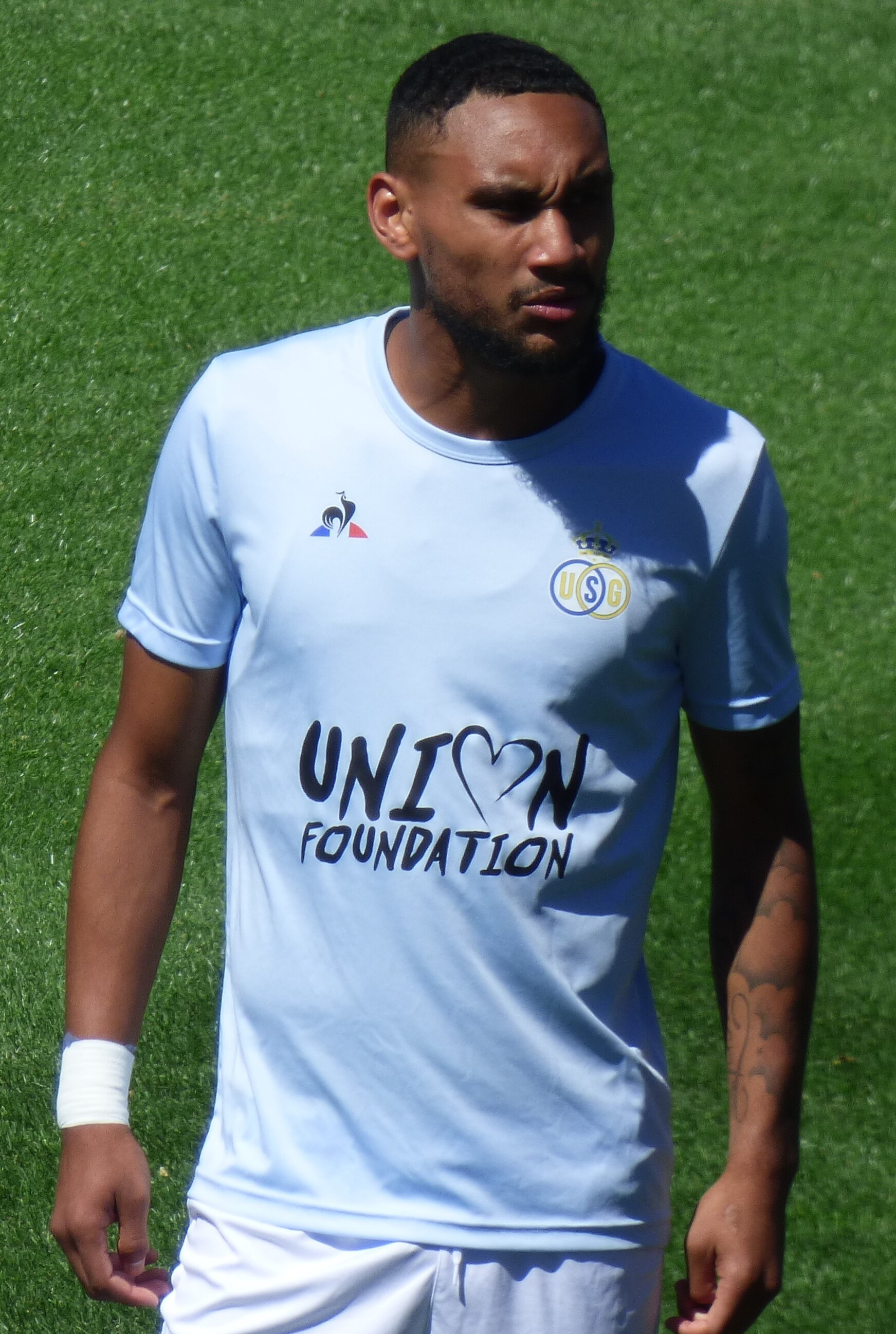
- Lapoussin in 2020

Personal information
- Date of birth: 27 March 1996 (age 30)
- Place of birth: Rosny-sous-Bois, France
- Height: 1.81 m (5 ft 11 in)
- Position: Midfielder

Team information
- Current team: Guangxi Hengchen
- Number: 11

Senior career*
Years	Team	Apps	(Gls)
2016–2017	Créteil II	22	(2)
2017–2019	Red Star	44	(2)
2019–2020	Virton	26	(5)
2020–2025	Union SG	138	(14)
2025	Sint Truiden	12	(3)
2026–	Guangxi Hengchen	0	(0)

International career^{‡}
2020–	Madagascar	21	(1)
- * Club domestic league appearances and goals as of 13 December 2025 ‡ National team caps and goals as of 14 October 2024

Loïc Lapoussin (born 27 March 1996) is a professional footballer who plays as a midfielder for China League One club Guangxi Hengchen. Born in France, he represents Madagascar at international level.

== Club career ==
Lapoussin made his Ligue 2 debut with Red Star F.C. in a 2–1 home defeat to Niort on the first matchday of the 2018–19 season on 27 July 2018.

In summer 2019, he joined Belgian First Division B side R.E. Virton.

After being linked with moves to Beerschot and Charleroi, Lapoussin moved to fellow First Division B club Union Saint-Gilloise in July 2020.

Each of Lapoussin's five seasons at Union would involve a title challenge of one form or another. Lapoussin won the First Division B title with Union in 2020-21, earning them a top flight place for the first time since 1973.

Union would be runners-up in the league behind Club Brugge in their first season back, leading the division for 200 days.

They finished third in the final-day three-way fight for the title in 2022-23, leading the live table entering stoppage time against Club Brugge, only to succumb to three goals from the 90-minute mark.

Lapoussin finished league runner-up again in 2023-24 with Union after being top for most of the season, but was in the starting line-up for their 2024 Belgian Cup Final success over Royal Antwerp, playing 81 minutes of the 1-0 victory at the King Bauduoin Stadium. It was Union's first major trophy since their 1935 League success, and the first time they had won the Cup in 110 years.

Having fallen out of favour with new coach Sebastien Pocognoli and being dropped to the Union B team, Lapoussin moved to Sint Truiden on 2 February 2025.

However, Lapoussin's six league appearances for Union entitled him to a league winner's medal and he was present for the clinching of their league championship triumph with their final day win over KAA Gent. Lapoussin also helped Sint-Truiden successfully win their fight against relegation.

Lapoussin's contract with Sint Truiden was ended in December 2025.

On 6 March 2026, Lapoussin signed with China League One club Guangxi Hengchen.

== International career ==
Lapoussin was born in France, and is of Malagasy descent. Lapoussin debuted with the Madagascar national team in a 2–1 2021 Africa Cup of Nations qualification loss to Ivory Coast on 12 November 2020.

== Career statistics ==
=== Club ===
As of match played 8 January 2025

Appearances and goals by club, season and competition
Club	Season	League			National cup		Europe		Other		Total	
Club	Season	Division	Apps	Goals	Apps	Goals	Apps	Goals	Apps	Goals	Apps	Goals
Créteil II	2016–17	Championnat National 3	22	2	—		—		—		22	2
Red Star	2017–18	Championnat National 2	21	1	2	0	—		—		23	1
Red Star	2018–19	Ligue 2	23	1	2	1	—		—		25	2
Red Star	Total		44	2	4	1	0	0	0	0	48	3
Virton	2019–20	Belgian First Division B	26	5	1	0	—		—		27	5
Union SG	2020–21	Belgian First Division B	21	2	3	1	—		—		24	3
Union SG	2021–22	Belgian First Division A	38	2	0	0	—		—		38	2
Union SG	2022–23	Belgian Pro League	38	3	4	0	12 (Note: Two appearances in the UEFA Champions League, Ten appearances in the UEFA Europa League)	1	—		54	4
Union SG	2023–24	Belgian Pro League	31	3	5	1	12 (Note: Eight appearances in the UEFA Europa League, four appearances in UEFA Conference League)	0	—		47	4
Union SG	2024–25	Belgian Pro League	6	1	3	1	0	0	0	0	9	2
Union SG	Total		134	11	15	3	23	1	0	0	172	15
Union SG II	2024–25	Belgian Division 3	4	1	—		—		—		4	1
Career total			230	21	20	4	23	1	0	0	273	26

=== International ===
As of match played 14 October 2024

Appearances and goals by national team and year
National team	Year	Apps	Goals
Madagascar	2020	2	0
Madagascar	2021	7	0
Madagascar	2022	2	0
Madagascar	2023	5	1
Madagascar	2024	5	0
Total		21	1

Scores and results list Madagascar's goal tally first, score column indicates score after each Lapoussin goal.

List of international goals scored by Loïc Lapoussin
No.	Date	Venue	Opponent	Score	Result	Competition
1	20 November 2023	Stade Municipal d'Oujda, Oujda, Morocco	Chad	3–0	3–0	2026 FIFA World Cup qualification

== Honours ==
Royale Union Saint-Gilloise

- Belgian Pro League: 2024–25
- Belgian Cup: 2023–24
