= Andrea Paolucci =

Italian footballer (born 1986)

Personal information
- Date of birth: 23 November 1986 (age 39)
- Place of birth: Pescara, Italy
- Height: 1.73 m (5 ft 8 in)
- Position: Midfielder

Team information
- Current team: Luparense

Youth career
- Pescara
- 2006: Fiorentina

Senior career*
Years	Team	Apps	(Gls)
2005–2006	Pescara	3	(0)
2006–2008	Fiorentina	0	(0)
2008	→ Cesena (loan)	4	(0)
2008–2009	→ Taranto (loan)	13	(0)
2009–2010	→ Andria BAT (loan)	32	(0)
2010–2012	Andria BAT	32	(2)
2012–2017	Cittadella	144	(5)
2017–2018	Ternana	34	(0)
2018–2023	Virtus Entella	158	(3)
2023–	Luparense	0	(0)
- * Club domestic league appearances and goals as of 23 April 2023

Andrea Paolucci (born 23 November 1986) is an Italian footballer who plays as a midfielder for Serie D club Luparense.

== Career ==
Born in Pescara, Abruzzo, Paolucci joined Fiorentina on 31 January 2006. He was a member of the youth team, losing to Juventus in the final. He remained in the Primavera under-20 team as overage player in 2006–07 and 2007–08 season.

He left for Cesena in January 2008 and then to Taranto. However, he was injured in his knee cruciate ligament. He missed 5 months.

In August 2009 he left for Andria BAT. On 15 July 2010 Andria bought him in co-ownership deal for a peppercorn fee of €500.

On 24 January 2012 Cittadella buy the half that belonged at Andria BAT for €80,000. On 23 June he is purchased entirely by Cittadella.

== Personal life ==
His younger brother Lorenzo Paolucci is also a football player.
