= Lazare Amani =

Ivorian footballer

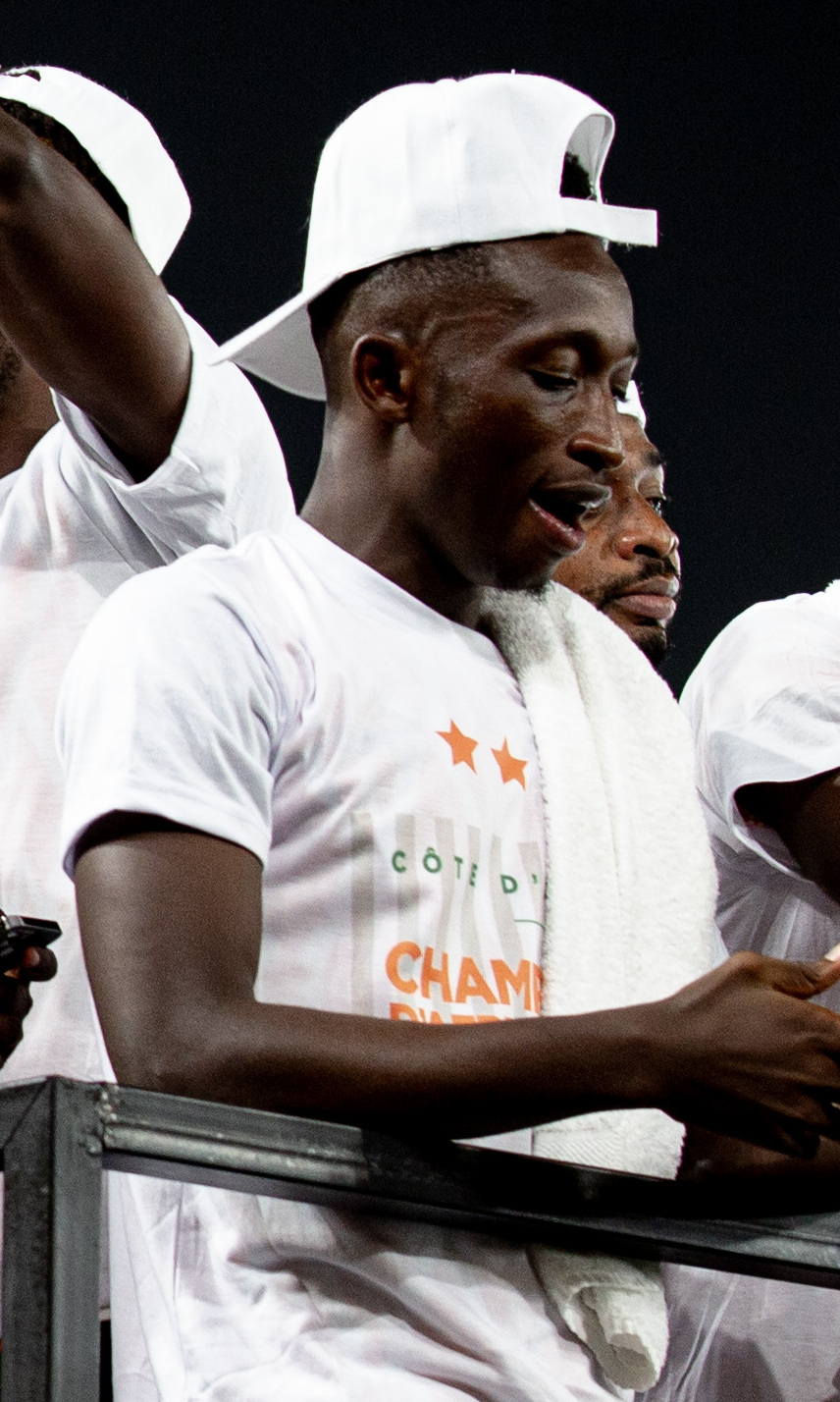
- Lazare in 2024

Personal information
- Full name: Jean Thierry Lazare Amani
- Date of birth: 7 March 1998 (age 28)
- Place of birth: Diégonéfla, Ivory Coast
- Height: 1.72 m (5 ft 8 in)
- Position: Central midfielder

Team information
- Current team: Cercle Brugge
- Number: 10

Youth career
- –2016: Aspire Academy

Senior career*
Years	Team	Apps	(Gls)
2016–2020	Eupen	91	(4)
2020–2022	Charleroi	0	(0)
2020–2021	→ Estoril (loan)	21	(1)
2021–2022	→ Union SG (loan)	34	(2)
2022–2025	Union SG	78	(3)
2025	→ Standard Liège (loan)	18	(2)
2025–2026	Kifisia	29	(2)
2026–	Cercle Brugge	2	(0)

International career^{‡}
2017	Ivory Coast U20	5	(2)
2019	Ivory Coast U23	4	(0)
2022–	Ivory Coast	7	(0)
Medal record
Representing Ivory Coast
Men's football
Africa Cup of Nations
Winner	2023 Ivory Coast
- * Club domestic league appearances and goals as of 14 August 2026 ‡ National team caps and goals as of 11 June 2024

Jean Thierry Lazare Amani (born 7 March 1998) is an Ivorian professional footballer who plays as a central midfielder for Belgian Pro League club Cercle Brugge and the Ivory Coast national team.

== Club career ==
On 22 June 2021, he joined Union Saint-Gilloise on a season-long loan. On 20 April 2022, Union SG exercised their option to make the transfer permanent and signed a three-year contract with Amani.

On 26 January 2025, Lazare moved to Standard Liège on loan with an option to buy.

In the summer of 2026, he signed a two-year contract with Cercle Brugge.

== International career ==
Lazare represented the Ivory Coast national under-20 football team at the 2017 Toulon Tournament.

Lazare made his debut for Ivory Coast national football team in a 4–0 win over Burundi, on 16 November 2022.

During the 2023 Africa Cup of Nations, Lazare was part of the Côte d'Ivoire side that won the tournament; he made a substitute appearance in the final.

== Career statistics ==
=== Club ===
As of match played 9 April 2023

Appearances and goals by club, season and competition
Club	Season	League			Cup		League cup		Continental		Other		Total	
Club	Season	Division	Apps	Goals	Apps	Goals	Apps	Goals	Apps	Goals	Apps	Goals	Apps	Goals
AS Eupen	2016–17	Belgian First Division A	26	2	4	0	—		4 (Note: Appearances in Europa League play-offs)	0	—		34	2
AS Eupen	2017–18	Belgian First Division A	30	0	2	0	—		0	0	—		32	0
AS Eupen	2018–19	Belgian First Division A	28	1	1	0	—		0	0	—		29	1
AS Eupen	2019–20	Belgian First Division A	7	1	1	0	—		0	0	—		8	1
AS Eupen	Total		91	4	8	0	—		4	0	—		103	4
Charleloi	2019–20	Belgian First Division A	0	0	—		—		—		—		0	0
Estoril (loan)	2020–21	Liga Portugal 2	21	1	5	2	1	0	—		—		27	3
Union SG (loan)	2021–22	Belgian First Division A	34	2	2	1	—		—		—		36	3
Union SG	2022–23	Belgian First Division A	28	2	5	2	—		9 (Note: Two appearances in UEFA Champions League, seven appearances and two goals in UEFA Europa League)	2	—		43	6
Career total			174	9	20	5	1	0	13	0	0	0	209	16

=== International ===
As of match played 12 February 2024

Appearances and goals by national team and year
National team	Year	Apps	Goals
Ivory Coast	2022	1	0
Ivory Coast	2023	0	0
Ivory Coast	2024	2	0
Total		3	0

== Honours ==
Union SG

- Belgian Cup: 2023–24

Ivory Coast U23

- Africa U-23 Cup of Nations runner-up:2019

Ivory Coast

- Africa Cup of Nations: 2023

Individual

- Toulon Tournament Best XI: 2017
- Toulon Tournament Third best player: 2017
