= Dante Vanzeir =

Belgian footballer (born 1998)

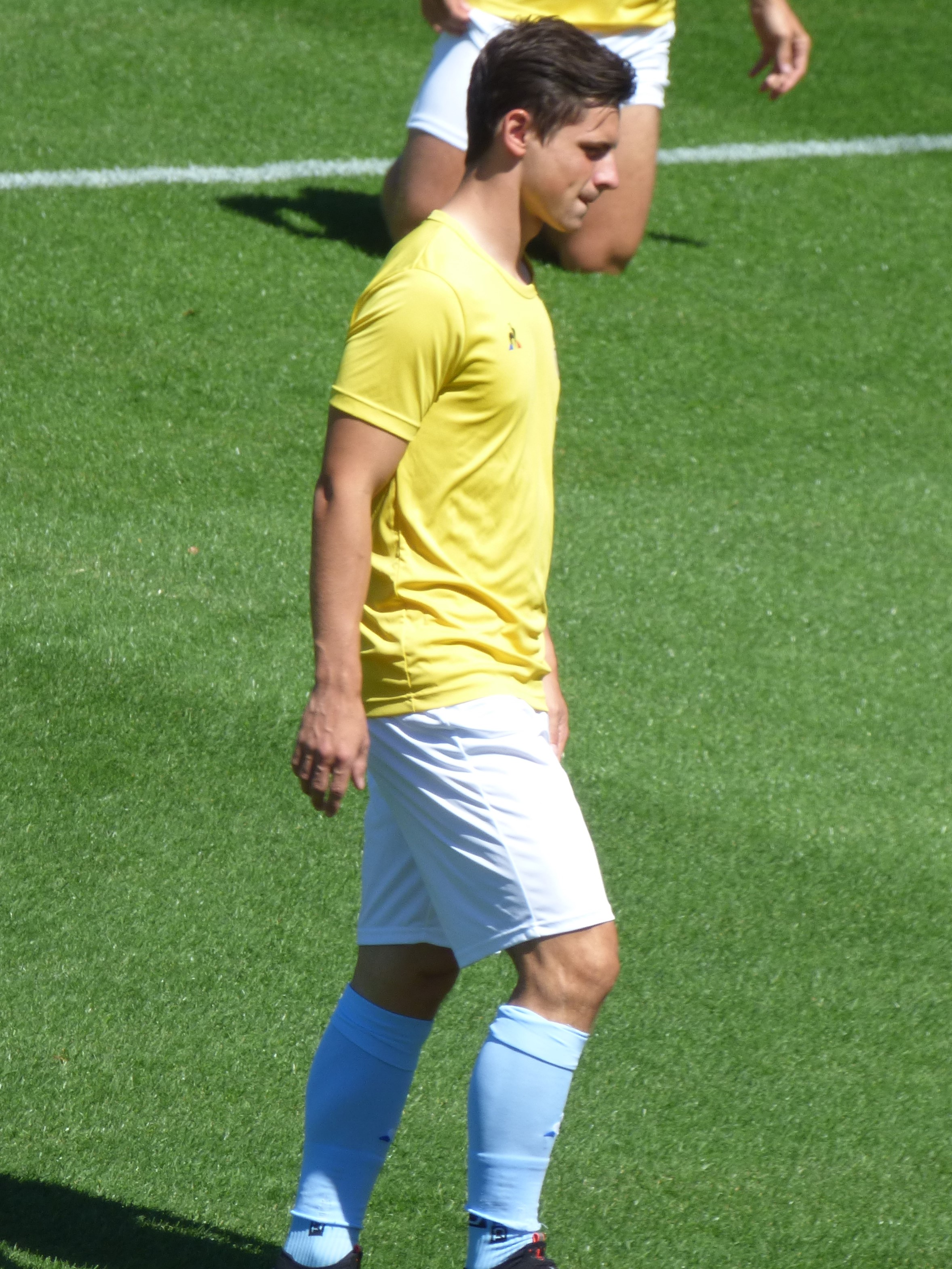
- Vanzeir during a friendly between Union SG and Lens in 2020

Personal information
- Full name: Dante Vanzeir
- Date of birth: 16 April 1998 (age 28)
- Place of birth: Beringen, Belgium
- Height: 1.75 m (5 ft 9 in)
- Positions: Forward; winger

Team information
- Current team: Cercle Brugge (on loan from Gent)
- Number: 13

Youth career
- 2004–2016: Genk

Senior career*
Years	Team	Apps	(Gls)
2016–2020	Genk	6	(1)
2018–2019	→ Beerschot Wilrijk (loan)	37	(15)
2019–2020	→ Mechelen (loan)	18	(3)
2020–2023	Union SG	79	(43)
2023–2024	New York Red Bulls	51	(6)
2025–	Gent	22	(5)
2025–	→ Cercle Brugge (loan)	17	(2)

International career^{‡}
2013	Belgium U15	5	(1)
2013–2014	Belgium U16	11	(4)
2015	Belgium U17	10	(2)
2016	Belgium U18	1	(0)
2016	Belgium U19	5	(1)
2019–2020	Belgium U21	5	(0)
2021–	Belgium	1	(0)
- * Club domestic league appearances and goals as of 14 August 2026 ‡ National team caps and goals as of 21:58, 16 November 2021 (UTC)

Dante Vanzeir (born 16 April 1998) is a Belgian professional footballer who plays as a forward and winger for Pro League side Cercle Brugge on loan from Gent, and the Belgium national team.

== Club career ==
=== Genk ===
Born in Beringen, Vanzeir is a youth exponent from K.R.C. Genk. He started playing with the youth academy of Genk when he was eleven.

He made his Belgian Pro League debut on 18 September 2016 in a 2–0 home defeat against Anderlecht, replacing Leon Bailey after 81 minutes. Vanzeir scored his first goal in the Belgian Pro League on 24 January 2018 in a 2–1 victory against Lokeren. On 20 July 2019, Vanzeir scored the third goal for Genk in a 3–0 victory over Mechelen in the 2019 Belgian Super Cup.

==== Loan to Beerschot Wilrijk ====
For the 2018–19 season Vanzeir was loaned to Beerschot Wilrijk in the second-tier First Division B. While with Beerschot Wilrijk he contributed 16 goals in 39 matches helping his team compete at the top of the division and narrowly missing out on promotion.

==== Loan to KV Mechelen ====
For the 2019–20 season Vanzeir was loaned to newly promoted top flight club KV Mechelen. On 20 September 2019 he scored his first two goals for the club in a 3–2 victory against K.V. Kortrijk.

=== Union SG ===
On 30 July 2020, Genk announced that they had sold Vanzeir to Royale Union Saint-Gilloise, with whom he signed a contract until the summer of 2023. With Union, he became champion in First Division B on 13 March 2021, with Union returning to the Belgian First Division after 48 years. Vanzeir had a big part in the title win, being the club's top scorer and the joint top scorer of the competition with 19 league goals.

On 25 July 2021, the day of his return to the Jupiler Pro League, Vanzeir provided an assist for the go-ahead goal in the Brussels derby against RSC Anderlecht, which Union eventually won 3–1. Two days later, Vanzeir extended his contract until 2024, with an option for an additional year. On 28 August he scored a hat-trick in the home game against Standard Liège. Thanks to the front strike-force of Vanzeir and Deniz Undav, Union finished second behind Club Brugge in their first season back in the top flight since 1973. Union had been top of the table for 200 days.

On 2 August 2022, Vanzeir scored his first international goal in a 2–0 victory over Rangers, at the Den Dreef Stadium in the first leg of the third preliminary round of the UEFA Champions League.

=== New York Red Bulls ===
On 3 February 2023, New York Red Bulls announced that they had acquired Vanzeir from Royale Union Saint-Gilloise. On 18 March 2023, Vanzeir scored his first goal for New York, an 86th-minute strike, helping his club to a 2–1 victory over Columbus Crew.

Vanzeir made his first start for the Red Bulls on 8 April 2023. During the second half of the match, Vanzeir used a racial slur; the incident resulted in a lengthy stoppage in play. He was suspended for six matches and given an undisclosed fine. Vanzeir claimed in an interview he called the referee a "monkey" thinking it meant "clown."

On 30 July 2023, Vanzeir helped New York to a 2–1 victory over Atlético San Luis in the Leagues Cup, scoring two goals including a stoppage time winner which helped his club advance to the next round. These were the first two goals scored in the competition by the club. On 23 March 2024, Vanzeir recorded a club record 4 assists in a 4–0 win over Inter Miami. On 6 April 2024, Vanzeir scored his first goal of the season and assisted on another in a 2–1 victory over FC Cincinnati. On 23 November 2024, Vanzeir scored and assisted on another for New York in a 2–0 victory over New York City FC, helping Red Bulls to advance to the Eastern Conference Final.

=== Gent ===
After struggling for goals in MLS, Vanzeir returned to Belgium on 24 January 2025, signing with Gent until June 2028 for a reported transfer fee of $3 million.

==== Loan to Cercle Brugge ====
After getting little game at Gent, he got sent on loan to Cercle Brugge on 6 January 2026, signing on a 6-month loan deal. The loan was later extended for the 2026–27 season.

== International career ==
In November 2021, he was called up to the senior Belgium squad for 2022 FIFA World Cup qualification matches, on 13 and 16 November against Estonia and Wales respectively. He made his debut against Wales.

== Personal life ==
Vanzeir is of Polish and Ukrainian descent through his mother. His sister, Luna Vanzeir, is also a football player. She plays for Anderlecht of the Super League.

== Career statistics ==
=== Club ===
As of match played 21 December 2025

Appearances and goals by club, season and competition
Club	Season	League			National cup (Note: Includes Belgian Cup.)		League cup		Continental (Note: Includes Leagues Cup.)		Other		Total	
Club	Season	Division	Apps	Goals	Apps	Goals	Apps	Goals	Apps	Goals	Apps	Goals	Apps	Goals
Genk	2016–17	Belgian First Division A	1	0	1	0	—		—		—		2	0
Genk	2017–18	Belgian First Division A	5	1	1	0	—		—		—		6	1
Genk	2019–20	Belgian First Division A	0	0	0	0	—		—		1 (Note: Appearance in Belgian Super Cup)	1	1	1
Genk	Total		6	1	2	0	0	0	0	0	1	1	9	2
Beerschot Wilrijk (loan)	2018–19	Belgian First Division B	29	13	2	1	—		—		8 (Note: Appearances in First Division A Europa League play-offs)	2	39	16
Mechelen (loan)	2019–20	Belgian First Division A	18	3	0	0	—		—		—		18	3
Union SG	2020–21	Belgian First Division B	24	19	3	2	—		—		—		27	21
Union SG	2021–22	Belgian First Division A	35	14	1	1	—		—		—		36	15
Union SG	2022–23	Belgian First Division A	20	10	1	0	—		7 (Note: Appearances in UEFA Champions League third qualifying round and UEFA Europa League)	2	—		28	12
Union SG	Total		79	43	5	3	0	0	7	2	0	0	91	48
New York Red Bulls	2023	MLS	19	2	1	1	0	0	4	2	0	0	24	5
New York Red Bulls	2024	MLS	32	4	0	0	5	2	2	0	0	0	39	6
New York Red Bulls	2025	MLS	0	0	0	0	0	0	0	0	0	0	0	0
New York Red Bulls	Total		51	6	1	1	5	2	6	2	0	0	63	11
Gent	2024–25	Belgian Pro League	17	5	0	0	—		2 (Note: Appearances in UEFA Conference League)	0	—		19	5
Gent	2025–26	Belgian Pro League	5	0	1	0	—		—		—		6	0
Gent	Total		22	5	1	0	—		2	0	—		25	5
Career total			205	71	11	5	5	2	15	4	9	3	245	85

== Honours ==
Genk

- Belgian Super Cup: 2019
- Belgian Cup runner-up: 2017–18

Union SG

- Belgian Pro League runner-up: 2021–22
- Belgian First Division B: 2020–21

Individual

- Belgian Second Division Footballer of the Year: 2020–21
- Belgian First Division B top scorer: 2020–21 (joint – 19 goals)
