= Lorenzo Paolucci =

Italian footballer (born 1996)

Personal information
- Date of birth: 1 October 1996 (age 30)
- Place of birth: Pescara, Italy
- Height: 1.74 m (5 ft 9 in)
- Position: Midfielder

Team information
- Current team: Cittadella

Youth career
- –2014: Pescara

Senior career*
Years	Team	Apps	(Gls)
2015–2019	Pescara	1	(0)
2015–2016	→ Teramo (loan)	21	(0)
2016–2017	→ Taranto (loan)	28	(1)
2017–2018	→ Teramo (loan)	6	(0)
2018–2019	→ Monopoli (loan)	41	(5)
2019–2021	Reggina	8	(1)
2020–2021	→ Monopoli (loan)	33	(3)
2021–2022	Union SG	1	(0)
2022–2024	Ancona	56	(8)
2024–2026	Audace Cerignola	59	(5)
2026–	Cittadella	0	(0)
- * Club domestic league appearances and goals as of 1 May 2026

Lorenzo Paolucci (born 1 October 1996) is an Italian professional footballer who plays as a midfielder for Serie C Group A club Cittadella.

== Club career ==
He made his Serie B debut for Pescara on 17 January 2015 in a game against Trapani.

On 17 July 2019, he signed a 3-year contract with Reggina. On 4 September 2020 he returned to Monopoli on a season-long loan.

On 30 June 2021, he signed a three-year contract with Belgian club Union SG.

On 19 August 2022, Paolucci returned to Italy and joined Ancona.

== Personal life ==
His older brother Andrea Paolucci is also a football player. His younger brother, Alex Paolucci, is also a football player and model in Tollo, Abruzzo.
