= Marcel Mehlem =

German footballer

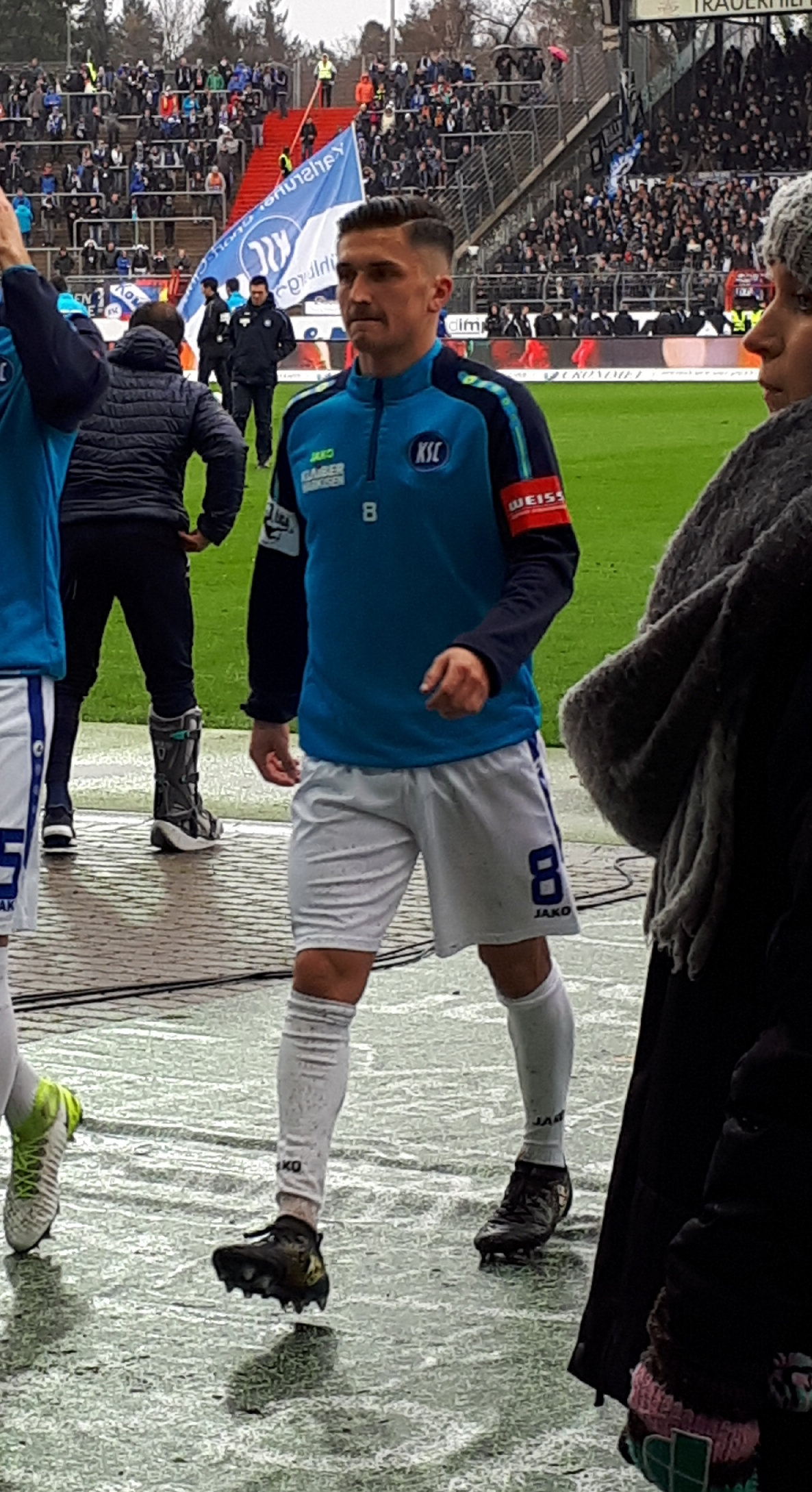
- Mehlem with Karlsruher SC in 2018

Personal information
- Date of birth: 1 March 1995 (age 31)
- Place of birth: Germersheim, Germany
- Height: 1.78 m (5 ft 10 in)
- Position: Defensive midfielder

Youth career
- SV Blankenloch
- –2014: Karlsruher SC

Senior career*
Years	Team	Apps	(Gls)
2014–2017	Karlsruher SC II	76	(8)
2017–2018	Karlsruher SC	32	(2)
2018–2021	Union St. Gilloise	60	(0)
2021–2023	SC Paderborn	31	(1)
2023	→ SV Sandhausen (loan)	8	(0)
2023–2024	SC Verl	18	(0)
- * Club domestic league appearances and goals as of 18 May 2024

Marcel Mehlem (born 1 March 1995) is a German professional footballer who plays as a defensive midfielder.

== Club career ==
On 4 September 2023, Mehlem joined SC Verl in 3. Liga.

== Career statistics ==
As of 1 July 2019

Appearances and goals by club, season and competition
Club	Season	League			National cup		League cup		Other		Total	
Club	Season	Division	Apps	Goals	Apps	Goals	Apps	Goals	Apps	Goals	Apps	Goals
Karlsruher SC	2016–17	2. Bundesliga	4	0	0	0	0	0	0	0	4	0
Karlsruher SC	2017–18	3. Liga	28	2	0	0	0	0	2	0	30	2
Karlsruher SC	Total		32	2	0	0	0	0	2	0	34	2
Union SG	2018–19	Belgian First Division B	23	0	0	0	0	0	0	0	23	0
Career total			54	2	0	0	0	0	2	0	57	2
