= Lucas Pirard =

Belgian footballer

Personal information
- Date of birth: 10 March 1995 (age 31)
- Place of birth: Sprimont, Belgium
- Height: 1.91 m (6 ft 3 in)
- Position: Goalkeeper

Team information
- Current team: Standard Liège
- Number: 21

Youth career
- –2013: Standard Liège

Senior career*
Years	Team	Apps	(Gls)
2013–2016	Standard Liège	0	(0)
2015–2016	→ Lommel United (loan)	28	(0)
2016–2019	Sint-Truiden	57	(0)
2019–2021	Waasland-Beveren	14	(0)
2020–2021	→ Union SG (loan)	2	(0)
2021–2023	Union SG	1	(0)
2023–2025	Kortrijk	24	(0)
2025–	Standard Liège	11	(0)

International career^{‡}
2010	Belgium U15	1	(0)
2010–2011	Belgium U16	5	(0)
2011–2012	Belgium U17	8	(0)
2012–2013	Belgium U18	5	(0)
2013–2014	Belgium U19	10	(0)
2015	Belgium U21	1	(0)
- * Club domestic league appearances and goals as of 31 May 2026 ‡ National team caps and goals as of 18:22, 27 March 2017 (UTC)

Lucas Pirard (born 10 March 1995) is a Belgian professional footballer who plays for Standard Liège in the Belgian Pro League as a goalkeeper.

== Club career ==
On 11 July 2019 he signed a 3-year contract with Waasland-Beveren.

After playing for Union SG on loan in the spring of 2021, on 16 June 2021 he re-joined the club for the 2021–22 season.

On 25 August 2023, Pirard signed a two-season contract with Kortrijk.

On 18 June 2025, Pirard returned to Standard Liège on a three-season deal.
