= Mathias Fixelles =

Belgian footballer

Personal information
- Date of birth: 11 August 1996 (age 30)
- Place of birth: Soignies, Belgium
- Height: 1.83 m (6 ft 0 in)
- Position: Midfielder

Team information
- Current team: Eupen
- Number: 70

Youth career
- –2014: OH Leuven
- 2014–2015: Tubize
- 2015: Sint-Truiden

Senior career*
Years	Team	Apps	(Gls)
2015–2016	Woluwe-Zaventem	33	(3)
2016–2021	Union SG	119	(1)
2021–2022	Kortrijk	20	(0)
2022–2026	Westerlo	61	(3)
2026	Francs Borains	10	(0)
2026–	Eupen	5	(0)
- * Club domestic league appearances and goals as of 19 September 2026

Mathias Fixelles (born 11 August 1996) is a Belgian professional footballer who plays for Challenger Pro League club Eupen. He can play either as a central or attacking midfielder.

== Club career ==
Mathias Fixelles started his career with Woluwe-Zaventem.

On 11 June 2021, he signed a three-year contract with Kortrijk.

On 31 January 2022, Fixelles moved to Westerlo on a 2.5-year contract.

== Honours ==
Westerlo

- Belgian First Division B: 2021–22
