= Roman Ferber =

Malagasy footballer (born 1993)

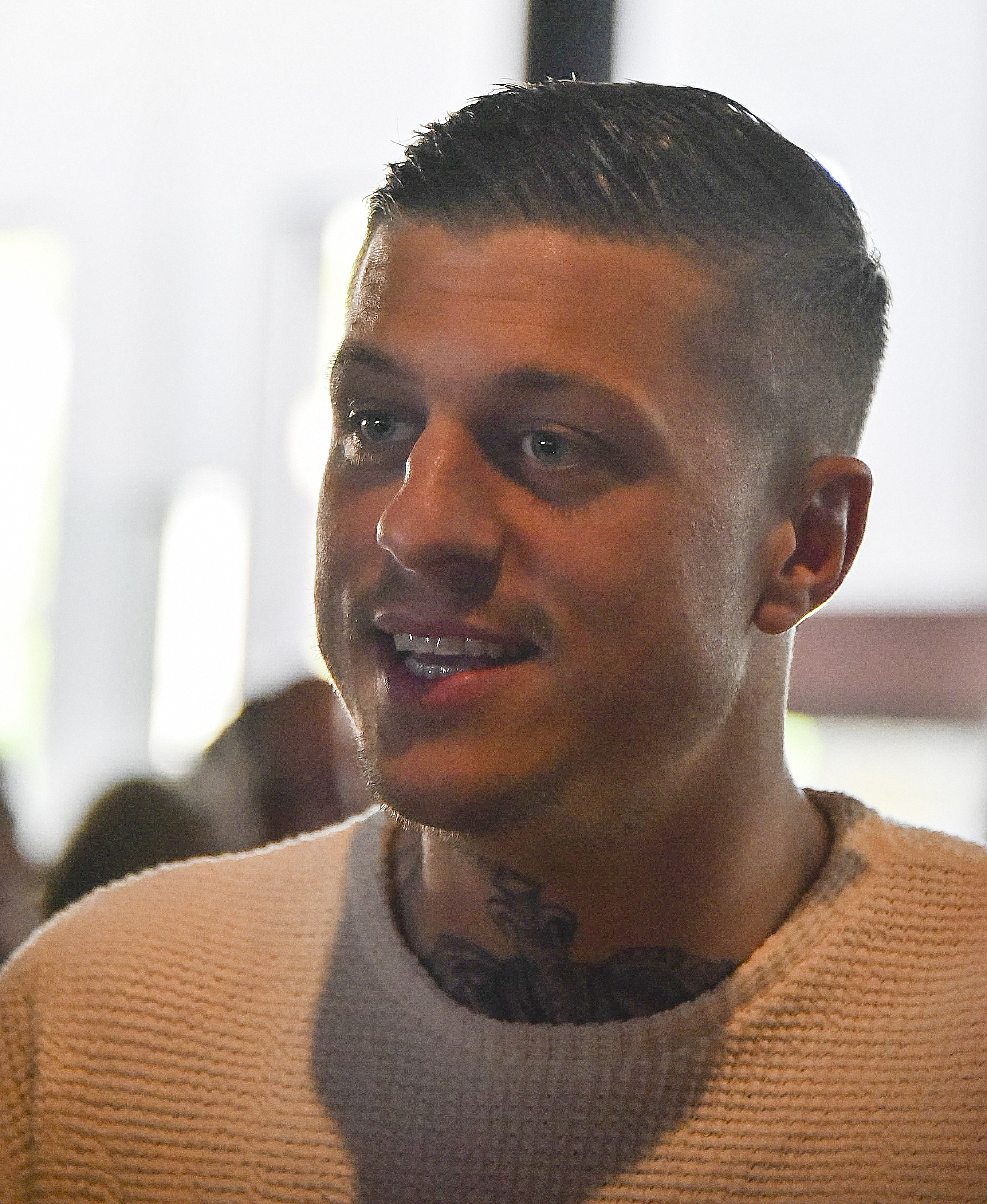

Personal information
- Date of birth: 29 May 1993 (age 33)
- Place of birth: Belgium
- Height: 1.90 m (6 ft 3 in)
- Position: Forward

Team information
- Current team: Atert Bissen
- Number: 30

Youth career
- AS Châtelineau
- FC Gily
- Sporting Charleroi
- Charleroi-Marchienne

Senior career*
Years	Team	Apps	(Gls)
2014–2015	RAEC Mons	26	(6)
2015–2017	Sporting Charleroi	13	(2)
2016–2017	→ Excel Mouscron (loan)	7	(1)
2017–2021	Union SG	80	(15)
2020–2021	→ Francs Borains (loan)		
2021–2022	Mandel United	21	(3)
2022–2024	Patro Eisden	39	(15)
2024–2025	Olympic Charleroi	32	(13)
2025–	Atert Bissen	31	(30)

International career^{‡}
2026–	Madagascar	2	(0)
- * Club domestic league appearances and goals as of 11 October 2026 ‡ National team caps and goals as of 29 September 2026

Roman Ferber (born 29 May 1993) is a footballer who plays as a forward for Luxembourgish club Atert Bissen. Born in Belgium, he represents Madagascar internationally.

== Club career ==
Ferber joined Belgian side RAEC Mons in 2014 while working in the construction industry. After Mons were declared bankrupt in March 2015, he moved to Sporting Charleroi. He joined Excel Mouscron on loan for the 2016–17 season. He played for Olympic Charleroi between January 2024 and August 2025, being part of the squad which won promotion to the Challenger Pro League. He subsequently signed for Atert Bissen of Luxembourg.

== International career ==
In September 2026, Ferber was called up to the Madagascar national team by manager Corentin Martins. Ferber became eligible to play for Madagascar after obtaining Malagasy citizenship through his Malagasy wife.

On 25 September 2026, Ferber made his international debut for Madagascar in an AFCON qualifier game against Nigeria.
