= 2023–24 Challenger Pro League =

Challenger Pro League
- Season: 2023–24
- Champions: Beerschot
- Promoted: Beerschot; Dender
- Relegated: Oostende; SL16 FC
- Matches: 186
- Goals: 517 (2.78 per match)
- Top goalscorer: 2 players (11 goals)
- Biggest home win: Patro Eisden Maasmechelen 4–0 Club NXT; Dender EH 5–1 Seraing; Deinze 4–0 Lierse Kempenzonen; RFC Liège 5–1 Beveren
- Biggest away win: Seraing 0–5 Zulte Waregem
- Highest scoring: Francs Borains 2–5 Jong Genk; Zulte Waregem 2–5 RSCA Futures
- Longest winning run: 5 matches (Beveren)
- Longest unbeaten run: 9 matches (Beveren)
- Longest losing run: 8 matches (SL16 FC)

The 2023–24 season of the Challenger Pro League began in August 2023 and ended in May 2024. It is the second season under its new name after being renamed from First Division B.

== Team changes ==
This season, the league was expanded from 12 to 16 teams.

=== Incoming ===
- Francs Borains, Patro Eisden and RFC Liège were promoted from the 2022–23 Belgian National Division 1. Both clubs will play their first-ever season at the second level.
- Oostende, Seraing and Zulte Waregem were relegated from the 2022–23 Belgian Pro League after 10, 2 and 18 years in top flight, respectively.

=== Outgoing ===
- RWD Molenbeek were promoted to 2023–24 Jupiler Pro League as champions.
- Virton were relegated to 2023–24 Belgian National Division 1 after finishing last.

== Format changes ==
As the league expanded from 12 to 16 teams, this also involved a new format: a regular round-robin tournament of 30 matchdays. After this, the champions and runners-up will both be promoted to the 2024–25 Belgian Pro League and similarly, the two bottom finishers will be relegated to the 2024–25 Belgian National Division 1. Play-offs will be organized between the teams finishing in positions 3 through 6, with the winner of these play-offs facing the runner-up of the relegation playoffs in the 2023–24 Belgian Pro League for the final remaining ticket in the 2024–25 Belgian Pro League.

U23 are in theory eligible for promotion and relegation but always have to play at least one level below their mother club. This means that:

- The four U23 teams in this division are not eligible for promotion. In case one or more of these teams finish in the top six positions, the promotion and play-offs spots will shift along to the next eligible team in the standings.
- Should one of the mother clubs of the teams in this division be relegated from the 2023–24 Belgian Pro League, the corresponding U23 team will be forced to relegate as well from the 2023–24 Challenger Pro League, irrespective of its finishing position.

== Team information ==
=== Stadiums and locations ===
Locations of the 2023–24 Challenger Pro League teams

Matricule	Club	City	First season of current spell at second level	Coming from	2022-23 result	Stadium	Capacity
35	RSCA Futures	Anderlecht, Brussels	2022–23	U23 competition	6th (CPL)	King Baudouin Stadium	38,000
13	K Beerschot VA	Antwerp	2022–23	Belgian First Division A	3rd (CPL)	Olympic Stadium	12,771
4068	S.K. Beveren	Beveren	2021–22	Belgian First Division B	2nd (CPL)	Freethiel Stadion	8,190
3	Club NXT	Bruges (Note: Club NXT did not play its home matches at the same venue as the A-squad of Club Brugge (the Jan Breydel Stadium) but rather they moved to Roeselare to play in the Schiervelde Stadion.)	2022–23	U23 competition	4th (CPL)	Schiervelde Stadion	8,340
818	K.M.S.K. Deinze	Deinze	2020–21	Belgian First Amateur Division	8th (CPL)	Burgemeester Van de Wiele Stadion	7,515
3900	Dender	Denderleeuw	2022–23	Belgian National Division 1	9th (CPL)	Van Roystadion	6,429
5192	Francs Borains	Boussu	2023–24	Belgian National Division 1	3rd (NatD1)	Stade Robert Urbain	6,000
322	Jong Genk	Genk	2022–23	U23 competition	11th (CPL)	Luminus Arena	24,956
3970	Lierse Kempenzonen	Lier	2020–21	Belgian First Amateur Division	5th (CPL)	Herman Vanderpoortenstadion	14,538
2554	Lommel SK	Lommel	2018–19	Belgian First Amateur Division	7th (CPL)	Soevereinstadion	8,000
31	Oostende	Ostend	2023–24	Belgian Pro League	16th (BPL)	Diaz Arena	8,432
3434	Patro Eisden Maasmechelen	Maasmechelen	2023–24	Belgian National Division 1	1st (NatD1)	Gemeentelijk Sportparkstadion	5,500
4	RFC Liège	Liège	2023–24	Belgian National Division 1	2nd (NatD1)	Stade de Rocourt	8,000
167	Seraing	Seraing	2023–24	Belgian Pro League	18th (BPL)	Stade du Pairay	8,207
16	SL16 FC	Liège	2022–23	U23 competition	10th (CPL)	Stade Maurice Dufrasne	30,023
5381	Zulte Waregem	Waregem	2023–24	Belgian Pro League	17th (BPL)	Regenboogstadion	12,500

== Regular season ==
=== League table ===
Pos	Team	Pld	W	D	L	GF	GA	GD	Pts	Qualification
1	Beerschot (C, P)	30	17	5	8	46	29	+17	56	Promoted to Pro League
2	Dender EH (P)	30	15	9	6	55	32	+23	54	Promoted to Pro League
3	Deinze	30	16	5	9	48	37	+11	53	Qualification for promotion play-offs
4	Lommel (O)	30	15	7	8	51	31	+20	52	Qualification for promotion play-offs
5	Zulte Waregem	30	15	6	9	51	34	+17	51	Qualification for promotion play-offs
6	Patro Eisden Maasmechelen	30	14	9	7	40	28	+12	51	Qualification for promotion play-offs
7	RFC Liège	30	15	4	11	49	41	+8	49	
8	Beveren	30	13	6	11	44	40	+4	45	
9	Club NXT	30	11	4	15	40	49	−9	37	Ineligible for promotion and promotion play-offs
10	Jong Genk	30	10	7	13	46	52	−6	37	Ineligible for promotion and promotion play-offs
11	Lierse Kempenzonen	30	10	5	15	44	59	−15	35	
12	RSCA Futures	30	8	10	12	39	47	−8	34	Ineligible for promotion and promotion play-offs
13	Oostende (R)	30	10	8	12	32	39	−7	32 (Note: On 20 December 2023, Oostende were deducted 3 points for outstanding debts and not adhering to the Belgian FA regulations. One day later, another 6 points were deducted for missing a second deadline for repayment of debts. Oostende appealed this decision and the verdict on 25 January 2024 reduced the points deduction back to 6 points. They were still not allowed to have incoming transfers. On 14 May 2024, one month after completion of the season, Oostende announced it had not found an investor to take over the club and due to financial debts would not be able to meet the criteria for playing in the Challenger Pro League or even the Belgian National Division 1. As a result, the club will at least relegate two levels to the Belgian Division 2 and be penalized with -3 points. On 3 June 2024, the club officially filed for bankruptcy and is in talks with neighboring clubs to form a merger and restart at the level of that club. If no club is found willing to merge with KV Oostende, the club can only restart the at the bottom of the Belgian football pyramid, the fourth West-Flanders provincial league (level 9).)	Dissolved due to bankruptcy
14	Francs Borains	30	9	5	16	38	52	−14	32	
15	Seraing (Note: Seraing would have been relegated but due to Oostende not receiving a license one month after completion of the season, the team was spared.)	30	6	10	14	33	51	−18	28	
16	SL16 FC (R)	30	5	2	23	25	60	−35	17	Relegated to National Division 1

Source: Challenger Pro League
Rules for classification: 1) Points; 2) Matches won; 3) Goal difference; 4) Goals scored; 5) Away goals scored; 6) Away matches won; 7) Play-off.
(C) Champions; (O) Play-off winners; (P) Promoted; (R) Relegated

=== Positions by round ===
The table lists the positions of teams after the completion of each round, with postponed matches and points deductions only included when occurring. Teams that have played fewer matches are shown with their position underlined:

- The match between SL16 FC and Beerschot of matchday 3 was postponed due to being prohibited by the mayor of Liège, it was rescheduled to be played between matchdays 14 and 15 and hence its effects will only appear in the table below at the end of matchday 15.
- The match between Dender EH and Francs Borains on matchday 14 was postponed due to snow. It was played a few days later between matchdays 14 and 15 and hence its effects will only appear in the table below at the end of matchday 15.
- On 20 December 2023, between matchdays 16 and 17, Oostende was deducted 9 points (3+6) for outstanding debts and breach of Belgian FA regulations.
- The matches Lommel-Beerschot, Dender EH-Seraing, Francs Borains-Oostende, and RSCA Futures-RFC Liege of matchday 18 were all postponed due to snow. All matches will be played on 7 February, between matchdays 20 and 21, except for Francs Borains-Oostende which was rescheduled to 14 February, between matchdays 21 and 22.
- On 25 January 2024, between matchdays 18 and 19, the points deduction of Oostende was reduced from 9 to 6 points.

Colored cells refer to being promoted (green), in promotion play-offs (yellow) or relegation play-offs (red). Note that U23 teams are ineligible for promotion and playoffs, and the coloring is adjusted accordingly. Furthermore, if one of the mother clubs of these four teams is relegated, the U23 would automatically take up one of the relegation spots as U23 teams always have to remain at least one level below their mother club, this is not accounted for in the coloring until after the season.

Team ╲ Round	1	2	3	4	5	6	7	8	9	10	11	12	13	14	15	16	17	18	19	20	21	22	23	24	25	26	27	28	29	30
Beerschot	2	4	10	6	7	5	6	5	3	3	2	2	1	1	2	2	1	1	1	1	1	1	1	2	1	1	1	1	1	1
Dender EH	6	7	8	9	6	9	10	8	8	6	7	5	6	9	4	5	3	5	6	7	7	5	6	6	5	4	3	2	2	2
Deinze	13	12	13	7	5	7	8	7	5	5	6	4	3	3	3	3	4	3	3	2	2	2	2	1	2	3	4	5	3	3
Lommel	7	2	1	1	1	1	1	1	2	2	3	3	5	6	9	8	7	8	5	5	3	4	5	3	3	2	2	3	4	4
Zulte Waregem	15	11	2	2	2	2	3	2	1	1	1	1	2	2	1	1	2	2	2	3	4	3	4	4	4	6	6	6	5	5
Patro Eisden Maasmechelen	4	5	4	4	3	3	2	6	7	7	4	6	4	4	5	4	8	4	4	4	5	6	3	5	6	5	5	4	6	6
RFC Liège	12	15	11	14	10	6	5	4	6	8	5	7	8	5	6	7	6	7	8	8	8	7	7	7	7	7	7	7	7	7
Beveren	10	14	15	11	11	12	12	14	12	10	11	11	10	8	7	6	5	6	7	6	6	8	8	8	8	8	8	8	8	8
Club NXT (Note: ineligible for promotion and playoffs)	5	8	3	3	8	4	4	3	4	4	8	8	9	7	10	10	10	10	10	11	11	11	11	10	9	9	9	10	11	9
Jong Genk	8	1	5	5	9	10	7	9	10	12	14	15	16	12	13	14	11	11	11	10	9	10	10	11	11	10	10	9	9	10
Lierse Kempenzonen	9	6	7	12	13	15	15	15	14	13	12	10	11	11	11	11	12	12	13	13	13	14	14	14	14	13	12	11	10	11
RSCA Futures	14	10	12	13	15	14	14	11	9	9	9	9	7	10	8	9	9	9	9	9	10	9	9	9	10	11	11	12	12	12
Oostende	11	16	16	16	14	13	13	13	15	15	15	12	12	13	14	12	16	16	16	14	15	13	13	13	13	14	14	14	14	13
Francs Borains	3	9	6	8	4	8	9	10	11	14	10	13	13	14	16	16	13	13	12	12	12	12	12	12	12	12	13	13	13	14
Seraing	1	3	9	10	12	11	11	12	13	11	13	14	14	15	15	15	15	15	15	16	14	15	15	15	15	15	15	15	15	15
SL16 FC	16	13	14	15	16	16	16	16	16	16	16	16	15	16	12	13	14	14	14	15	16	16	16	16	16	16	16	16	16	16

Source: worldfootball.net

=== Results ===
Home \ Away	BEE	DEN	DEI	LOM	ZWA	PEM	RFC	BEV	NXT	GNK	LIE	AND	OOS	FRB	SER	STA
Beerschot		0–1	1–2 (Note: After the match between SL16 FC and Beerschot had been prohibited by the mayor of Liège in August citing a lack of available police officers, the match of matchday 3 was rescheduled from 26 August to 5 December, in between matchdays 14 and 15. As a result, the calendar commission also decided to switch the places on the calendar of the matches Seraing-Lommel (from 10 to 8 December) and Beerschot-Deinze (from 8 to 10 December).)	2–1	1–2	0–1	3–0	0–0	3–0	1–0	1–2	1–1	1–1	2–1	0–0	2–0
Dender EH	1–1		3–0	3–1	1–4	0–0	0–0	1–0	2–0	1–3	2–2	2–3	1–1	2–0 (Note: The match between Dender EH and Francs Borains of matchday 14 (3 December) was postponed for two days due to snow.)	5–1 (Note: Four matches of matchday 18 were postponed due to snow. Lommel-Beerschot, Dender EH-Seraing, and RSCA Futures-RFC Liège were rescheduled to 7 February, between matchdays 20 and 21. Francs Borains-Oostende will be played one week later on 14 February, between matchdays 21 and 22. To allow all teams sufficient time in between matches (at least 48 hours), the calendar of matchday 21 was altered strongly: the matches Deinze-Patro Eisden Maasmechelen (10 Feb to 9 Feb), Francs Borains-Club NXT (11 Feb to 9 Feb) and Beveren-SL16 FC (11 Feb to 10 Feb) were moved ahead, while Zulte Waregem-Lommel (9 Feb to 10 Feb), Jong Genk-Dender EH (9 Feb to 11 Feb) and Oostende-RFC Liège (10 Feb to 11 Feb) were shifted backward.)	4–1
Deinze	4–2	1–1		3–2	1–1	0–0	3–1	0–0	1–3	3–2	4–0	4–1	1–0	2–3	1–0	2–1
Lommel	3–0	2–2	1–0		1–1	1–2	4–1	3–1	1–0	0–1	3–0	3–1	0–1	3–0	0–0	1–0
Zulte Waregem	0–1	1–1	2–1	0–3		0–0	1–0	0–1	0–1	1–1	4–1	2–5	0–1	1–3	2–1	1–1
Patro Eisden Maasmechelen	0–2	1–1	3–1	3–0	0–3		0–2	2–1	4–0	2–2	3–0	0–0	2–3	3–1	2–1	3–1
RFC Liège	1–4	0–1	1–0	2–1	0–2	1–0		5–1	3–1	5–0	2–4	0–2	2–0	1–0	2–1	1–1
Beveren	2–0	3–2	2–2	2–2	0–3	0–1	1–2		0–2	2–1	3–1	2–1	2–3	3–0	1–1	2–0
Club NXT	0–2	0–1	0–1	0–2	1–3	2–2	1–2	0–3		2–1	3–2	0–1	3–3	1–0	1–1	4–1
Jong Genk	1–2	2–1	3–2	1–1	2–4	0–1	2–3	1–0	0–3		1–3	3–0 (Note: Some matches of matchdays 19 were moved due to the 2024 Belgian Presidency of the Council of the European Union, in particular, Jong Genk-RSCA Futures moved from 26 January to 27 January, Francs Borains-Beveren moved from 27 January to 26 January.)	3–1	1–1	1–1	1–0
Lierse Kempenzonen	1–3	2–4	0–1	1–2	0–1	2–1	3–2	2–2	3–1	3–1		1–1	1–2	3–1	1–0	1–4
RSCA Futures	1–3	2–1	1–3	1–1	0–1	1–3	1–1	0–2	1–2	1–1	3–3		0–0	3–3	1–2	3–0
Oostende	1–2	0–1	0–1	0–1	3–2	0–0	0–2	0–2	1–4	2–2	0–1	1–2		1–0	1–1	2–1
Francs Borains	1–3	0–3	0–1	1–2	2–1	0–0	2–2	3–0	2–2	2–5	2–0	1–0	0–2		0–2	2–1
Seraing	1–2	1–3	1–2	2–2	0–5	3–0	0–4	1–2	2–1	1–3	1–1	1–1	1–1	1–5		3–0
SL16 FC	1–0	0–4	2–1	0–4	1–3	0–1	2–1	1–4	1–2	3–1	0–1	0–1	0–1	1–2	1–2	

Source: Flashscore
Legend: Blue = home team win; Yellow = draw; Red = away team win.

== Promotion play-offs ==
=== Promotion/relegation play-offs ===
The promotion/relegation play-offs were contested by the teams finishing in positions 3 to 6 in the 2023–24 Challenger Pro League, who met in a knockout tournament with both quarter-finals and semi-finals over two legs, and the highest season finisher always having home advantage in the return leg. The winner of the semi-finals played the 14th place finisher of the 2023–24 Belgian Pro League over two legs. The Belgian Pro League team had home advantage in the return leg; the winner of the final would play in the 2024–25 Belgian Pro League, with the loser playing in the 2024–25 Challenger Pro League.

==== Bracket ====
Quarter-finals
5	Zulte Waregem	1	0	1
4	Lommel	1	1	2
6	Patro Eisden Maasmechelen	0	1	1
3	Deinze	4	2	6

Semi-finals
4	Lommel	1	2	3
3	Deinze	1	1	2

Finals
14	Kortrijk (a.e.t.)	1	4	5
4	Lommel	0	2	2

==== Quarter-finals ====
27 April 2024
16:00 CEST

Patro Eisden Maasmechelen	0–4	Deinze
	Report	Almenara 42'; Kehrer 53', 78'; Mertens 63' (pen.)

Patrostadion, Maasmechelen
Referee: Wim Smet
1 May 2024
16:00 CEST

Deinze	2–1	Patro Eisden Maasmechelen
Schuermans 62'; Van Landschoot 71'	Report	Noubissi 18'

Dakota Arena, Deinze
Referee: Jan Boterberg

Deinze won 6–1 on aggregate.

27 April 2024
20:00 CEST

Zulte Waregem	1–1	Lommel
Vossen 66' (pen.)	Report	Dermane 89'

Elindus Arena, Waregem
Referee: Michiel Allaerts
1 May 2024
20:00 CEST

Lommel	1–0	Zulte Waregem
Schoofs 78'	Report

Soevereinstadion, Lommel
Referee: Wesli De Cremer

Lommel won 2–1 on aggregate.

==== Semi-finals ====
5 May 2024
16:00 CEST

Lommel	1–1	Deinze
Vancsa 55'	Report	Braken 76'

Soevereinstadion, Lommel
Referee: Lothar D'Hondt
12 May 2024
16:00 CEST

Deinze	1–2	Lommel
Mertens 66'	Report	Talvitie 41'; Rosa 80'

Dakota Arena, Deinze
Referee: Wesli De Cremer

Lommel won 3–2 on aggregate.

==== Finals ====
19 May 2024
19:15 CEST

Lommel	0–1	Kortrijk
	Report	Kadri 14' (pen.)

Soevereinstadion, Lommel
Referee: Lawrence Visser
26 May 2024
13:30 CEST

Kortrijk	4–2 (a.e.t.)	Lommel
Ambrose 96', 101', 117'; Silva 109'	Report	Rosa 3'; Schoofs 105' (pen.)

Guldensporen Stadion, Kortrijk
Referee: Bert Put

Kortrijk won 5–2 on aggregate.

== Season statistics ==
=== Top scorers ===
Note: goals during the playoffs are not included.

Rank	Player	Club	Goals
1	(Central African Republic) Goduine Koyalipou	Beveren	15
2	(Belgium) Bruny Nsimba	Dender EH	14
3	(Belgium) Jelle Vossen	Zulte Waregem	13
4	(Nigeria) Victory Beniangba	Jong Genk	12
5	(Belgium) Adriano Bertaccini	RFC Liège	11
5	(Hungary) Zalán Vancsa	Lommel	11
7	(Senegal) Pape Moussa Fall	Seraing	10
7	(Belgium) Tom Reyners	Beerschot	10
7	(Brazil) Arthur Sales	Lommel	10
10	(Nigeria) Jordan Attah Kadiri	Francs Borains	9
10	(Belgium) Lennart Mertens	Deinze	9
10	(Belgium) Thibaut Van Acker	Lierse Kempenzonen	9

8 goals (1 player)
- (Guinea-Bissau) Zinho Gano (Zulte Waregem)
7 goals (6 players)
- (Belgium) Lenn De Smet (Club NXT)
- (Belgium) Jellert Van Landschoot (Deinze)
- (Belgium) Thomas Claes (Jong Genk)
- (Belgium) Lucas Schoofs (Lommel)
- (Belgium) Mohamed Berte (Oostende)
- (Iceland) Stefán Ingi Sigurdarson (Patro Eisden Maasmechelen)
6 goals (13 players)
- (Nigeria) Taofeek Ismaheel (Beveren)
- (Belgium) Anthony Limbombe (Beveren)
- (Belgium) Romeo Vermant (Club NXT)
- (Venezuela) Teo Quintero (Deinze)
- (Turkey) Ali Akman (Dender EH)
- (France) Corenthyn Lavie (Francs Borains)
- (Belgium) Konstantinos Karetsas (Jong Genk)
- (Ghana) Eric Ocansey (Lierse Kempenzonen)
- (Angola) Igor Vetokele (Lommel)
- (Guinea) Bafodé Dansoko (Patro Eisden Maasmechelen)
- (Belgium) Benoît Nyssen (RFC Liège)
- (Japan) Keisuke Goto (RSCA Futures)
- (Morocco) Soufiane Benjdida (SL16 FC)
5 goals (12 players)
- (Cameroon) Simion Michez (Beerschot)
- (Belgium) Mardochee Nzita (Beerschot)
- (Belgium) Thibaud Verlinden (Beerschot)
- (Spain) Víctor Barberà (Club NXT)
- (Mauritania) Souleymane Anne (Deinze)
- (Belgium) Noah Adedeji-Sternberg (Jong Genk)
- (Belgium) Obbi Oularé (Lierse Kempenzonen)
- (Belgium) Alessio Cascio (RFC Liège)
- (Ecuador) Nilson Angulo (RSCA Futures)
- (Scotland) Robbie Ure (RSCA Futures)
- (Belgium) Brahim Ghalidi (SL16 FC)
- (Brazil) Matheus Machado (Zulte Waregem)
4 goals (19 players)
- (France) Charly Keita (Beerschot)
- (England) D'Margio Wright-Phillips (Beerschot)
- (Belgium) Mo Salah (Club NXT)
- (Belgium) Gaëtan Hendrickx (Deinze)
- (Germany) Emilio Kehrer (Deinze)
- (Belgium) Lennard Hens (Dender EH)
- (Belgium) Michaël Lallemand (Dender EH)
- (Belgium) Olivier Myny (Dender EH)
- (Republic of Ireland) Matthew Healy (Francs Borains)
- (Scotland) Ewan Henderson (Oostende)
- (Venezuela) Daniel Pérez (Oostende)
- (Belgium) Kevin Kis (Patro Eisden Maasmechelen)
- (Cameroon) Marius Noubissi (Patro Eisden Maasmechelen)
- (Belgium) Elisha Sam (Patro Eisden Maasmechelen)
- (Belgium) Benoît Bruggeman (RFC Liège)
- (Republic of the Congo) Yannick Loemba (RFC Liège)
- (Belgium) Antoine Colassin (RSCA Futures)
- (Senegal) Alioune Ndour (Zulte Waregem)
- (Ivory Coast) Abdoulaye Traoré (Zulte Waregem)
3 goals (23 players)
- (Greece) Apostolos Konstantopoulos (Beerschot)
- (Liberia) Ayouba Kosiah (Beerschot)
- (Trinidad and Tobago) Sheldon Bateau (Beveren)
- (Morocco) Amine Et Taïbi (Club NXT)
- (Japan) Shion Homma (Club NXT)
- (Belgium) Kobe Cools (Dender EH)
- (Belgium) Guillaume De Schryver (Dender EH)
- (Belgium) Stefano Marzo (Dender EH)
- (Belgium) Jordy Soladio (Dender EH)
- (France) Yanis Massolin (Francs Borains)
- (Belgium) Robin Mirisola (Jong Genk)
- (Belgium) Viktor Boone (Lierse Kempenzonen)
- (Belarus) Maksim Kireev (Lierse Kempenzonen)
- (France) Ousmane Sow (Lierse Kempenzonen)
- (Finland) Juho Talvitie (Lommel)
- (Belgium) Damien Mouchamps (RFC Liège)
- (Belgium) Reno Wilmots (RFC Liège)
- (Belgium) Tristan Degreef (RSCA Futures)
- (Belgium) Luca Monticelli (RSCA Futures)
- (Belgium) Christophe Lepoint (Seraing)
- (France) Marvin Tshibuabua (Seraing)
- (Belgium) Daan Dierckx (SL16 FC)
- (Netherlands) Ruud Vormer (Zulte Waregem)
2 goals (46 players)
- (Belgium) Welat Cagro (Beerschot)
- (Burundi) Marco Weymans (Beerschot)
- (Croatia) Jakov Filipović (Beveren)
- (Slovakia) David Hrnčár (Beveren)
- (Belgium) Sem Audoor (Club NXT)
- (Norway) Benjamin Faraas (Club NXT)
- (Belgium) Laurent Lemoine (Deinze)
- (Belgium) Kenneth Schuermans (Deinze)
- (Belgium) Ridwane M'Barki (Dender EH)
- (Slovenia) Nicolas Rajsel (Dender EH)
- (France) Hedy Chaabi (Francs Borains)
- (Belgium) Niklo Dailly (Francs Borains)
- (Guinea) Fodé Guirassy (Francs Borains)
- (Belgium) Faissal Al Mazyani (Jong Genk)
- (Guinea) Ibrahima Sory Bangoura (Jong Genk)
- (Tanzania) Kelvin John (Jong Genk)
- (Belgium) Nolan Martens (Jong Genk)
- (Belgium) Alexandre De Bruyn (Lierse Kempenzonen)
- (Belgium) Joeri Poelmans (Lierse Kempenzonen)
- (Belgium) Nils Schouterden (Lierse Kempenzonen)
- (Belgium) Stan Van Dessel (Lierse Kempenzonen)
- (Croatia) Leon Lalić (Lommel)
- (Belgium) Dries Wouters (Lommel)
- (Ghana) David Atanga (Oostende)
- (France) Maxime D'Arpino (Oostende)
- (Colombia) Juanda Fuentes (Oostende)
- (Belgium) Wouter Corstjens (Patro Eisden Maasmechelen)
- (Belgium) Jordan Renson (Patro Eisden Maasmechelen)
- (Belgium) Abian Arslan (RFC Liège)
- (Belgium) Zakaria Atteri (RFC Liège)
- (Belgium) Jordan Bustin (RFC Liège)
- (France) Ryan Merlen (RFC Liège)
- (Belgium) Mohamed Moulhi (RFC Liège)
- (Belgium) Amando Lapage (RSCA Futures)
- (Belgium) Lucas Lissens (RSCA Futures)
- (Belgium) Lilian Vergeylen (RSCA Futures)
- (Algeria) Maïdine Douane (Seraing)
- (Belgium) Valentin Guillaume (Seraing)
- (France) Gerald Kilota (Seraing)
- (Benin) Désiré Segbé Azankpo (Seraing)
- (Belgium) Noah Solheid (Seraing)
- (France) Édouard Soumah-Abbad (Seraing)
- (England) Romaine Mundle (SL16 FC)
- (Belgium) Oscar Olivier (SL16 FC)
- (Belgium) Robbe Decostere (Zulte Waregem)
- (Belgium) Dylan Demuynck (Zulte Waregem)
1 goal (86 players)
- (Belgium) Sekou Diawara (Beerschot)
- (Belgium) Ryan Sanusi (Beerschot)
- (North Macedonia) Erdon Daci (Beveren)
- (Belgium) Jay-Dee Geusens (Beveren)
- (France) Bryan Goncalves (Beveren)
- (Brazil) Everton Luiz (Beveren)
- (Belgium) Jenthe Mertens (Beveren)
- (Denmark) Yousef Salech (Beveren)
- (Belgium) Mathis Servais (Beveren)
- (Belgium) Dries Wuytens (Beveren)
- (Belgium) Denzel De Roeve (Club NXT)
- (Belgium) Liam De Smet (Club NXT)
- (Spain) Alejandro Granados (Club NXT)
- (Ecuador) Joel Ordóñez (Club NXT)
- (Belgium) Joaquin Seys (Club NXT)
- (Belgium) Chemsdine Talbi (Club NXT)
- (Netherlands) Sven Braken (Deinze)
- (Ivory Coast) Mamadou Koné (Deinze)
- (France) Nicolas Mercier (Deinze)
- (Belgium) Alessio Staelens (Deinze)
- (Belgium) Desmond Acquah (Dender EH)
- (Belgium) Dylan Ragolle (Dender EH)
- (Belgium) Gilles Ruyssen (Dender EH)
- (Belgium) Jasper Van Oudenhove (Dender EH)
- (France) Teddy Chevalier (Francs Borains)
- (Luxembourg) Alessio Curci (Francs Borains)
- (Belgium) Thierno Diallo (Francs Borains)
- (Belgium) Romain Donnez (Francs Borains)
- (France) Clément Tainmont (Francs Borains)
- (France) Kévin Vandendriessche (Francs Borains)
- (Belgium) Adnane Abid (Jong Genk)
- (Nigeria) Christian Akpan (Jong Genk)
- (Belgium) Wilson Da Costa (Jong Genk)
- (Japan) Naoki Kumata (Jong Genk)
- (Belgium) Cédric Nuozzi (Jong Genk)
- (Belgium) Sebastiaan Brebels (Lierse Kempenzonen)
- (Belgium) Glenn Claes (Lierse Kempenzonen)
- (Belgium) Jens Cools (Lierse Kempenzonen)
- (Netherlands) Luc Marijnissen (Lierse Kempenzonen)
- (Peru) Kluiverth Aguilar (Lommel)
- (Brazil) Cauê (Lommel)
- (Netherlands) Sam De Grand (Lommel)
- (Togo) Karim Dermane (Lommel)
- (Sweden) Amar Fatah (Lommel)
- (Brazil) Diego Rosa (Lommel)
- (Belgium) Alessandro Albanese (Oostende)
- (France) Thomas Basila (Oostende)
- (Belgium) Sieben Dewaele (Oostende)
- (Belgium) Robbie D'Haese (Oostende)
- (Germany) Luis Hartwig (Oostende)
- (Belgium) Brent Laes (Oostende)
- (England) Zech Medley (Oostende)
- (Belgium) Anton Tanghe (Oostende)
- (Belgium) Siebe Wylin (Oostende)
- (Belgium) Simon Bammens (Patro Eisden Maasmechelen)
- (Democratic Republic of the Congo) Leslie Bamona Lubelu (Patro Eisden Maasmechelen)
- (France) Yacine Bentayeb (Patro Eisden Maasmechelen)
- (Algeria) Anis Hadj Moussa (Patro Eisden Maasmechelen)
- (Belgium) Stef Peeters (Patro Eisden Maasmechelen)
- (France) Théo Pierrot (Patro Eisden Maasmechelen)
- (Belgium) Lukas Van Eenoo (Patro Eisden Maasmechelen)
- (Belgium) Maxime Cavelier (RFC Liège)
- (Belgium) Jonathan D'Ostilio (RFC Liège)
- (Belgium) Benjamin Lambot (RFC Liège)
- (Belgium) Ismaël Baouf (RSCA Futures)
- (Belgium) Mohamed Bouchouari (RSCA Futures)
- (Belgium) Devon Decorte (RSCA Futures)
- (England) Tudor Mendel-Idowu (RSCA Futures)
- (Guinea) Alama Bayo (Seraing)
- (Belgium) Mathieu Cachbach (Seraing)
- (France) Sambou Sissoko (Seraing)
- (Morocco) Anisse Brrou (SL16 FC)
- (Belgium) Mouad El Fanis (SL16 FC)
- (Belgium) Noah Makembo-Ntemo (SL16 FC)
- (Mexico) Jorge Ruvalcaba (SL16 FC)
- (Morocco) Samy Tory (SL16 FC)
- (Morocco) Ilyes Ziani (SL16 FC)
- (Belgium) Christian Brüls (Zulte Waregem)
- (Belgium) Yannick Cappelle (Zulte Waregem)
- (Belgium) Alessandro Ciranni (Zulte Waregem)
- (Senegal) Pape Diop (Zulte Waregem)
- (Cyprus) Stavros Gavriel (Zulte Waregem)
- (Belgium) Andres Labie (Zulte Waregem)
- (Nigeria) Tochukwu Nnadi (Zulte Waregem)
- (Belgium) Nicolas Rommens (Zulte Waregem)
- (Belgium) Moudou Tambedou (Zulte Waregem)
4 own goals (1 player)
- (Belgium) Jano Willems (Club NXT, scored for Deinze, Oostende, Patro Eisden Maasmechelen and Seraing)
3 own goals (1 player)
- (Belgium) Levi Malungu (Francs Borains, scored for Beerschot, Dender EH and Lommel)
2 own goals (1 player)
- (Belgium) Kenneth Schuermans (Deinze, scored for Dender EH and Patro Eisden Maasmechelen)
1 own goal (21 players)
- (Greece) Apostolos Konstantopoulos (Beerschot, scored for Francs Borains)
- (Belgium) Derrick Tshimanga (Beerschot, scored for RSCA Futures)
- (Trinidad and Tobago) Sheldon Bateau (Beveren, scored for Lommel)
- (Brazil) Everton Luiz (Beveren, scored for Dender EH)
- (Belgium) Louis Verstraete (Beveren, scored for Seraing)
- (Morocco) Amine Et Taïbi (Club NXT, scored for Lierse Kempenzonen)
- (Belgium) Kyriani Sabbe (Club NXT, scored for Zulte Waregem)
- (Belgium) Mike Penders (Jong Genk, scored for Oostende)
- (Belgium) Josue Kongolo (Jong Genk, scored for SL16 FC)
- (Belgium) Jarno Libert (Lierse Kempenzonen, scored for Beveren)
- (Netherlands) Sam De Grand (Lommel, scored for Beveren)
- (Belgium) Amando Lapage (RSCA Futures, scored for Deinze)
- (Belgium) Nail Moutha-Sebtaoui (RSCA Futures, scored for Lierse Kempenzonen)
- (Morocco) Anas Tajaouart (RSCA Futures, scored for Francs Borains)
- (Senegal) Pape Moussa Fall (Seraing, scored for Dender EH)
- (Belgium) Noah Solheid (Seraing, scored for Francs Borains)
- (Senegal) Birame Diaw (SL16 FC, scored for Dender EH)
- (Belgium) Brahim Ghalidi (SL16 FC, scored for RSCA Futures)
- (Belgium) Ibe Hautekiet (SL16 FC, scored for Francs Borains)
- (Belgium) Léandre Kuavita (SL16 FC, scored for Lierse Kempenzonen)
- (England) Henry Lawrence (SL16 FC, scored for Francs Borains)

=== Team of the season ===
Upon completion of the regular season a team of the season award was compiled, based upon the results of the team of the week results, constructed based on nominations from managers, assistant managers, journalists, and analysts. The results were announced on 13 May 2024.

Pos		Player	Club
GK	(Spain)	Nacho Miras	Deinze
RB	(Belgium)	Benoît Nyssen	RFC Liège
CB	(Belgium)	Joedrick Pupe	Dender EH
CB	(Belgium)	Hervé Matthys	Beerschot
LB	(Netherlands)	Sam De Grand	Lommel
MF	(Belgium)	Ryan Sanusi	Beerschot
MF	(Belgium)	Lennard Hens	Dender EH
MF	(Belgium)	Gaëtan Hendrickx	Deinze
LW	(Belgium)	Thibaud Verlinden	Beerschot
FW	(Central African Republic)	Goduine Koyalipou	Beveren
RW	(Angola)	Bruny Nsimba	Dender EH

== Number of teams by provinces ==
Number of teams	Province or region	Team(s)
3	East Flanders	Beveren, Deinze and Dender EH
3	Liège	Seraing, SL16 FC and RFC Liège
3	Limburg	Jong Genk, Lommel and Patro Eisden Maasmechelen
3	West Flanders	Club NXT, Oostende and Zulte Waregem
2	Antwerp	Beerschot and Lierse Kempenzonen
1	Brussels	RSCA Futures
1	Hainaut	Francs Borains

== Attendances ==
#	Club	Average
1	Zulte Waregem	5,737
2	Beerschot	4,869
3	Beveren	2,748
4	Oostende	2,631
5	Lierse	2,462
6	Liège	2,180
7	Patro Eisden	1,518
8	Lommel	1,394
9	Dender	1,235
10	Francs Borains	1,148
11	Seraing	1,119
12	Deinze	1,055
13	Club NXT	568
14	SL16	521
15	Jong Genk	473
16	RSCA Futures	419
