= List of Belgian football transfers winter 2017–18 =

This is a list of Belgian football transfers for the 2017-18 winter transfer window. Only transfers involving a team from the professional divisions are listed, including the 16 teams in the 2017–18 Belgian First Division A and the 8 teams playing in the 2017–18 Belgian First Division B.

The winter transfer window opens on 1 January 2018, although a few transfers may take place prior to that date. The window closes at midnight on 1 February 2018 although outgoing transfers might still happen to leagues in which the window is still open. Players without a club may join teams, either during or in between transfer windows.

== Sorted by date ==
=== November ===
Date	Name	Moving from	Moving to	Fee	Note
8 November 2017	Frank Acheampong	Tianjin TEDA	Anderlecht	Undisclosed	(Note: Acheampong was already on loan from Anderlecht to Tianjin TEDA since the 2017 summer transfer window. Tianjin TEDA chose to pay the fee to convert the loan to a permanent transfer.)

=== December ===
Date	Name	Moving from	Moving to	Fee	Note
6 December 2017	Tesfaldet Tekie	Gent	Östersund	Loan	
8 December 2017	Thomas Matton	Gent	Free Agent	Retired	
12 December 2017	Olivier Werner	Free Agent	Excel Mouscron	NA	
15 December 2017	Yohan Croizet	Mechelen	Kansas City	Undisclosed	
15 December 2017	Anthony Swolfs	Mechelen	Gent	Undisclosed	
18 December 2017	Antun Palić	Excel Mouscron	Free Agent	Released	
19 December 2017	Riley McGree	Club Brugge	Newcastle Jets	Loan	
20 December 2017	Florian Raspentino	Free Agent	Eupen	NA	
22 December 2017	Trova Boni	Salitas	Mechelen	Undisclosed	
22 December 2017	Jonathan Kindermans	Mechelen	Union SG	Loan	
27 December 2017	Jean Alassane Mendy	Kristiansund	Lokeren	Free	

=== End of 2017 ===
Some players were on a loan which ended in 2017. As of 1 January 2018, they returned to their original club and are listed here. For a list of players on loan during the last year, see List of Belgian football transfers winter 2016–17 and summer 2017.

Date	Name	Moving from	Moving to	Fee	Note
End of 2017	Fran Brodić	Roeselare	Club Brugge	Loan Return	(Note: Brodić was originally on loan from Club Brugge to Roeselare until the end of the 2017-18 season, but the loan was terminated early.)
End of 2017	Ljuban Crepulja	Shakhtyor Soligorsk	Mechelen	Loan Return	
End of 2017	Grigoris Kastanos	Zulte Waregem	Juventus	Loan Return	(Note: Kastanos was originally on loan from Juventus to Zulte Waregem until the end of the 2017-18 season, but the loan was terminated early.)
End of 2017	Nicola Leali	Zulte Waregem	Juventus	Loan Return	(Note: Leali was originally on loan from Juventus to Zulte Waregem until the end of the 2017-18 season, but the loan was terminated early.)
End of 2017	Thanasis Papazoglou	Aalesund	Kortrijk	Loan Return	
End of 2017	Levan Shengelia	Daejeon Citizen	Tubize	Loan Return	
End of 2017	Luka Stojanović	Antwerp	Apollon Limassol	Loan Return	(Note: Stojanović was originally on loan from Antwerp to Apollon Limassol until the end of the 2017-18 season, but the loan was terminated early.)

=== January ===
Date	Name	Moving from	Moving to	Fee	Note
2 January 2018	Robert Berić	Anderlecht	Saint-Étienne	Loan Return	(Note: Berić was originally on loan from Saint-Etienne to Anderlecht until the end of the 2017-18 season, but all parties agreed to terminate the loan early.)
2 January 2018	Vladimir Gabulov	Arsenal Tula	Club Brugge	Undisclosed	
3 January 2018	Krépin Diatta	Sarpsborg 08	Club Brugge	Undisclosed	
3 January 2018	Hamdi Harbaoui	Anderlecht	Zulte Waregem	Undisclosed	
3 January 2018	Damien Marcq	Gent	Zulte Waregem	Undisclosed	
3 January 2018	Jonathan Mexique	Cercle Brugge	Monaco	Loan Return	(Note: Mexique was originally on loan from Monaco to Cercle Brugge until the end of the 2017-18 season, but the loan was terminated early to allow Mexique to be loaned to Tours.)
3 January 2018	Aleksandar Šofranac	Cercle Brugge	Sarajevo	Free	
3 January 2018	Clément Tainmont	Charleroi	Mechelen	Undisclosed	
3 January 2018	Lukas Van Eenoo	Kortrijk	Westerlo	Loan	
4 January 2018	Ludovic Butelle	Club Brugge	Angers	Undisclosed	
4 January 2018	Anders Christiansen	Malmö	Gent	Undisclosed	
4 January 2018	Kévin Hoggas	Bourg-en-Bresse Péronnas	Cercle Brugge	Undisclosed	
4 January 2018	Ibrahim Kargbo Junior	Free Agent	Roeselare	NA	
4 January 2018	Abou Ouattara	Salitas	Mechelen	Undisclosed	
5 January 2018	Fabien Camus	Free Agent	Mechelen	NA	
5 January 2018	Anthony D'Alberto	Braga B	Charleroi	Loan	
5 January 2018	Silvère Ganvoula	Mechelen	Anderlecht	Loan Return	(Note: Ganvoula was originally on loan from Anderlecht to Mechelen until the end of the 2017-18 season, but the loan was terminated early.)
5 January 2018	Romain Grange	Chamois Niortais	Charleroi	Undisclosed	
5 January 2018	Danijel Milićević	Gent	Metz	Loan	
5 January 2018	Kenny Saief	Gent	Anderlecht	Loan	
5 January 2018	Yuta Toyokawa	Kashima Antlers	Eupen	Undisclosed	(Note: Originally it was reported that Toyokawa was on loan from Leeds United to Eupen, however afterwards it became clear that while Eupen had consulted with Leeds United they had in fact signed the player directly from Kashima Antlers.)
5 January 2018	Nicolas Verdier	Eupen	Mechelen	Undisclosed	
7 January 2018	Mamoutou N'Diaye	Antwerp	Ohod	Undisclosed	
8 January 2018	Lennert De Smul	Kortrijk	Deinze	Loan	
8 January 2018	Romain Habran	Paris Saint-Germain Academy	Antwerp	Undisclosed	
8 January 2018	Hervé Kage	Kortrijk	Karabükspor	Loan	
8 January 2018	Laurent Mendy	Avenir	Antwerp	Undisclosed	
8 January 2018	Yehor Nazaryna	Dnipro	Antwerp	Undisclosed	
8 January 2018	Jonathan Pitroipa	Free Agent	Antwerp	NA	
8 January 2018	Sigurd Rosted	Sarpsborg 08	Gent	Undisclosed	
8 January 2018	Ivan Tomečak	Mechelen	Club Brugge	Undisclosed	
9 January 2018	Corentin Fiore	Standard Liège	Palermo	Undisclosed	
9 January 2018	Germán Mera	Club Brugge	Mechelen	Undisclosed	
9 January 2018	Jens Teunckens	Club Brugge	Antwerp	Loan	
10 January 2018	Laurens De Bock	Club Brugge	Leeds United	Undisclosed	
10 January 2018	Amadou Diallo	Cercle Brugge	Red Star	Free	
10 January 2018	Rangelo Janga	Trenčín	Gent	Undisclosed	
10 January 2018	Samy Kehli	Lokeren	OH Leuven	Loan	
10 January 2018	Mamadou Koné	Leganés	Eupen	Loan	
10 January 2018	Kawin Thamsatchanan	Muangthong United	OH Leuven	Undisclosed	
10 January 2018	Vagner	Cercle Brugge	Free Agent	Released	
11 January 2018	Reno Wilmots	Roeselare	Avellino	Undisclosed	
13 January 2018	Fatos Bećiraj	Dynamo Moscow	Mechelen	Free	
15 January 2018	Jajá Coelho	Lokeren	Muangthong United	Undisclosed	(Note: Coelho was on loan from Lokeren to Buriram United, the loan ended and Coelho was sold to Muangthong United.)
16 January 2018	Takehiro Tomiyasu	Avispa Fukuoka	Sint-Truiden	Undisclosed	
17 January 2018	Yoni Buyens	Genk	Lierse	Free	
17 January 2018	Abdelkarim Hassan	Eupen	Al Sadd	Loan Return	(Note: Hassan and Sanhaji were initially on loan from Al Sadd to Eupen until the end of the season but were both recalled early by Al Sadd.)
17 January 2018	Helibelton Palacios	Club Brugge	Atlético Nacional	Undisclosed	
17 January 2018	Hamza Sanhaji	Eupen	Al Sadd	Loan Return	
17 January 2018	Ibrahima Seck	Waasland-Beveren	Genk	Undisclosed	
17 January 2018	Yacouba Sylla	Rennes	Mechelen	Undisclosed	
19 January 2018	Rachid Aït-Atmane	Gijón	Waasland-Beveren	Loan	
19 January 2018	Lucas Schoofs	Gent	NAC Breda	Loan	
19 January 2018	Kenneth Vermeer	Feyenoord	Club Brugge	Loan	
20 January 2018	Joeri Dequevy	Antwerp	OH Leuven	Undisclosed	
21 January 2018	Faycal Rherras	Mechelen	Hibernian	Loan	
22 January 2018	Nathan Kabasele	Gazişehir Gaziantep	Union SG	Loan	
22 January 2018	Daisuke Sakai	Tubize	Oita Trinita	Loan Return	(Note: Sakai was originally on loan from Oita Trinita to Tubize until the end of the 2017-18 season, but the loan was terminated early as Sakai's visa expired.)
22 January 2018	Ronnie Schwartz	Waasland-Beveren	Sarpsborg 08	Undisclosed	
23 January 2018	Geert Berben	OH Leuven	Oosterzonen Oosterwijk	Loan	
23 January 2018	Ritchie De Laet	Aston Villa	Antwerp	Loan	
23 January 2018	Rémi Mulumba	Gazélec Ajaccio	Eupen	Undisclosed	
23 January 2018	Nicolae Stanciu	Anderlecht	Sparta Prague	Undisclosed	
24 January 2018	Eike Bansen	Borussia Dortmund II	Zulte Waregem	Undisclosed	
24 January 2018	Johan Lædre Bjørdal	Rosenborg	Zulte Waregem	Free	
24 January 2018	Stephen Buyl	Cercle Brugge	Westerlo	Loan	
25 January 2018	Sabir Bougrine	Lierse	Paris	Undisclosed	
25 January 2018	Gojko Cimirot	PAOK	Standard Liège	Undisclosed	
25 January 2018	Faysel Kasmi	Lierse	Waterford	Undisclosed	
26 January 2018	Théo Bongonda	Celta de Vigo	Zulte Waregem	Loan	
26 January 2018	Mathieu Peybernes	Lorient	Eupen	Loan	
27 January 2018	Filip Mladenović	Standard Liège	Lechia Gdańsk	Undisclosed	
27 January 2018	Gaëtan Robail	Cercle Brugge	Paris Saint-Germain	Loan Return	(Note: Robail was originally on loan from Paris Saint-Germain to Cercle Brugge until the end of the 2017-18 season, but the loan was terminated early to allow Robail to be loaned to Valenciennes.)
28 January 2018	Gillian Vaesen	Westerlo	Hoogstraten	Loan	
29 January 2018	Georgios Galitsios	Free Agent	Excel Mouscron	NA	
29 January 2018	László Köteles	Genk	Free Agent	Released	
29 January 2018	Lukáš Mareček	Sparta Prague	Lokeren	Undisclosed	
29 January 2018	Matej Mitrović	Beşiktaş	Club Brugge	Loan	
29 January 2018	Alexander Scholz	Standard Liège	Club Brugge	Undisclosed	
29 January 2018	Carlos Uhia	Fortaleza	Union SG	Undisclosed	
30 January 2018	Thomas Azevedo	OH Leuven	Lommel	Loan	
30 January 2018	Daam Foulon	Anderlecht	Waasland-Beveren	Undisclosed	(Note: Foulon was originally going to be transferred from Anderlecht to Waasland-Beveren only at the end of the 2017-18 season, but as part of the transfer of Ryota Morioka, the transfer of Foulon was moved ahead to January.)
30 January 2018	Lior Inbrum	Gent	Ashdod	Loan	(Note: Inbrum was originally on loan from Gent to Maribor until the end of the 2017-18 season, but the loan was terminated early to allow Inbrum to be loaned to Ashdod.)
30 January 2018	Dodi Lukebakio	Anderlecht	Charleroi	Undisclosed	(Note: Lukebakio was originally on loan from Anderlecht to Charleroi until the end of the 2017-18 season, but both clubs arranged to make the transfer permanent. Thereafter, Charleroi immediately sold Lukebakio to Watford.)
30 January 2018	Dodi Lukebakio	Charleroi	Watford	Undisclosed	
30 January 2018	Ryota Morioka	Waasland-Beveren	Anderlecht	Undisclosed	
30 January 2018	Rijad Sadiku	Sarajevo	Excel Mouscron	Undisclosed	
30 January 2018	Zinho Vanheusden	Inter	Standard Liège	Loan	
31 January 2018	Karim Achahbar	Guingamp	Tubize	Loan	
31 January 2018	Akram Afif	Eupen	Villarreal	Loan Return	(Note: Afif was originally on loan from Villarreal to Eupen until the end of the 2017-18 season, but the loan was terminated early to allow Afif to be loaned to Al Sadd.)
31 January 2018	Chuba Akpom	Arsenal	Sint-Truiden	Loan	
31 January 2018	Souleymane Aw	Eupen	Roeselare	Loan	
31 January 2018	Beni Badibanga	Standard Liège	Lierse	Loan	
31 January 2018	Mamadou Bagayoko	OH Leuven	Mechelen	Loan	
31 January 2018	Aliko Bala	Zulte Waregem	Hapoel Acre	Loan	
31 January 2018	Fran Brodić	Club Brugge	Catania	Loan	
31 January 2018	Charles Brym	Zulte Waregem	Lille	Undisclosed	
31 January 2018	Mehdi Carcela	Granada	Standard Liège	Loan	
31 January 2018	José Cevallos	LDU Quito	Lokeren	Undisclosed	
31 January 2018	Stefan Dražić	Mechelen	Free Agent	Released	
31 January 2018	Elderson Echiéjilé	Sivasspor	Cercle Brugge	Loan	
31 January 2018	Andy Faustin	Zulte Waregem	Free Agent	Released	
31 January 2018	Željko Filipović	Mechelen	Free Agent	Released	
31 January 2018	Jessy Gálvez López	Cercle Brugge	Free Agent	Released	
31 January 2018	Sofiane Hanni	Anderlecht	Spartak Moscow	Undisclosed	
31 January 2018	Ibou	Roeselare	Tubize	Undisclosed	
31 January 2018	Mario Jelavić	Istra 1961	Excel Mouscron	Undisclosed	
31 January 2018	Mohamed Kané	Metz	Tubize	Loan	
31 January 2018	Georgios Koutroumpis	Panathinaikos	Standard Liège	Undisclosed	
31 January 2018	Dylan Lambrecth	Anderlecht	Waremme	Loan	(Note: Lambrecth was originally on loan from Anderlecht to Union SG until the end of the 2017-18 season, but the loan was terminated early and Lambrecth was now loaned to Waremme.)
31 January 2018	Lazar Marković	Liverpool	Anderlecht	Loan	
31 January 2018	Divine Naah	Manchester City	Tubize	Loan	
31 January 2018	Dieumerci Ndongala	Standard Liège	Genk	Loan	
31 January 2018	Aristote Nkaka	Excel Mouscron	Oostende	Undisclosed	
31 January 2018	Erik Palmer-Brown	Manchester City	Kortrijk	Loan	
31 January 2018	Clément Petit	Anderlecht	Excel Mouscron	Undisclosed	
31 January 2018	Zotsara Randriambololona	Antwerp	Roeselare	Loan	
31 January 2018	Ben Reichert	Zulte Waregem	Hapoel Acre	Loan	
31 January 2018	Rauno Sappinen	Flora	Beerschot Wilrijk	Loan	
31 January 2018	Willy Semedo	Alki Oroklini	Charleroi	Undisclosed	
31 January 2018	Sébastien Siani	Oostende	Antwerp	Undisclosed	
31 January 2018	Noël Soumah	Gent	Westerlo	Loan	
31 January 2018	Kamal Sowah	Leicester City	OH Leuven	Loan	
31 January 2018	Tino-Sven Sušić	Genk	Antwerp	Undisclosed	(Note: Sušić was originally on loan from Genk to Maccabi Tel Aviv until the end of the 2017-18 season, but the loan was terminated early and Sušić was then sold to Antwerp.)
31 January 2018	Collins Tanor	Manchester City	Beerschot Wilrijk	Undisclosed	
31 January 2018	Niels Verburgh	Club Brugge	Waasland-Beveren	Loan	
31 January 2018	Louis Verstraete	Gent	Waasland-Beveren	Loan	
31 January 2018	Xandão	Gijón	Cercle Brugge	Free	

=== February ===
Date	Name	Moving from	Moving to	Fee	Note
5 February 2018	Ljuban Crepulja	Mechelen	Sarajevo	Free	
8 February 2018	Darko Bjedov	Gent	Rad	Loan	(Note: A loan deal was officially announced on 6 February, and confirmed two days later, on 8 February, per the winter transfer window in the Serbian football system.)
15 February 2018	Mario Tičinović	Lokeren	Hajduk Split	Loan	

== Sorted by team ==
=== Belgian First Division A teams ===
==== Anderlecht ====
In:

No.	Pos.	Nation	Player
—	FW	CGO	Silvère Ganvoula (loan return from Mechelen)
—	MF	SRB	Lazar Marković (on loan from Liverpool)
—	MF	JPN	Ryota Morioka (from Waasland-Beveren)
—	MF	USA	Kenny Saief (on loan from Gent)

Out:

No.	Pos.	Nation	Player
10	MF	ROU	Nicolae Stanciu (to Sparta Prague)
36	FW	SVN	Robert Berić (loan return to Saint-Étienne)
94	MF	ALG	Sofiane Hanni (to Spartak Moscow)
99	FW	TUN	Hamdi Harbaoui (to Zulte Waregem)
—	FW	GHA	Frank Acheampong (was on loan to Tianjin TEDA, now sold)
—	DF	BEL	Daam Foulon (to Waasland-Beveren)
—	FW	BEL	Dylan Lambrecth (was on loan to Union SG, now loaned to Waremme)
—	MF	COD	Dodi Lukebakio (was on loan to Charleroi, now sold)
—	FW	BEL	Clément Petit (to Excel Mouscron)

==== Antwerp ====
In:

No.	Pos.	Nation	Player
—	DF	BEL	Ritchie De Laet (on loan from Aston Villa)
—	MF	FRA	Romain Habran (from Paris Saint-Germain Academy)
—	FW	SEN	Laurent Mendy (from Avenir)
—	MF	UKR	Yehor Nazaryna (from Dnipro)
—	MF	BFA	Jonathan Pitroipa (free agent)
—	MF	CMR	Sébastien Siani (from Oostende)
—	FW	BIH	Tino-Sven Sušić (from Genk)
—	GK	BEL	Jens Teunckens (on loan from Club Brugge)

Out:

No.	Pos.	Nation	Player
11	MF	BEL	Joeri Dequevy (to OH Leuven)
17	MF	MLI	Mamoutou N'Diaye (to Ohod)
22	MF	SRB	Luka Stojanović (loan return to Apollon Limassol)
27	MF	MAD	Zotsara Randriambololona (on loan to Roeselare)

==== Charleroi ====
In:

No.	Pos.	Nation	Player
—	DF	BEL	Anthony D'Alberto (on loan from Braga B)
—	MF	FRA	Romain Grange (from Chamois Niortais)
—	MF	FRA	Willy Semedo (from Alki Oroklini)

Out:

No.	Pos.	Nation	Player
7	MF	FRA	Clément Tainmont (to Mechelen)
46	MF	COD	Dodi Lukebakio (from Anderlecht, then sold to Watford)

==== Club Brugge ====
In:

No.	Pos.	Nation	Player
—	MF	SEN	Krépin Diatta (from Sarpsborg 08)
—	GK	RUS	Vladimir Gabulov (from Arsenal Tula)
—	DF	CRO	Matej Mitrović (on loan from Beşiktaş)
—	DF	DEN	Alexander Scholz (from Standard Liège)
—	DF	CRO	Ivan Tomečak (from Mechelen)
—	GK	NED	Kenneth Vermeer (on loan from Feyenoord)

Out:

No.	Pos.	Nation	Player
1	GK	FRA	Ludovic Butelle (to Angers)
13	DF	COL	Helibelton Palacios (to Atlético Nacional)
16	DF	COL	Germán Mera (to Mechelen)
28	DF	BEL	Laurens De Bock (to Leeds United)
33	MF	AUS	Riley McGree (on loan to Newcastle Jets)
41	GK	BEL	Jens Teunckens (on loan to Antwerp)
—	FW	CRO	Fran Brodić (was on loan to Roeselare, now loaned to Catania)
—	MF	BEL	Niels Verburgh (on loan to Waasland-Beveren)

==== Eupen ====
In:

No.	Pos.	Nation	Player
—	FW	CIV	Mamadou Koné (on loan from Leganés)
—	MF	COD	Rémi Mulumba (from Gazélec Ajaccio)
—	DF	FRA	Mathieu Peybernes (on loan from Lorient)
—	FW	FRA	Florian Raspentino (free agent)
—	FW	JPN	Yuta Toyokawa (from Kashima Antlers)

Out:

No.	Pos.	Nation	Player
3	DF	QAT	Abdelkarim Hassan (loan return to Al Sadd)
7	FW	MAR	Hamza Sanhaji (loan return to Al Sadd)
11	MF	QAT	Akram Afif (loan return to Villarreal)
29	MF	SEN	Souleymane Aw (on loan to Roeselare)
99	FW	FRA	Nicolas Verdier (to Mechelen)

==== Excel Mouscron ====
In:

No.	Pos.	Nation	Player
—	DF	GRE	Georgios Galitsios (free agent)
—	FW	CRO	Mario Jelavić (from Istra 1961)
—	FW	BEL	Clément Petit (from Anderlecht)
—	DF	BIH	Rijad Sadiku (from Sarajevo)
—	GK	BEL	Olivier Werner (free agent)

Out:

No.	Pos.	Nation	Player
20	MF	CRO	Antun Palić (released)
26	MF	BEL	Aristote Nkaka (to Oostende)

==== Genk ====
In:

No.	Pos.	Nation	Player
—	MF	COD	Dieumerci Ndongala (on loan from Standard Liège)
—	MF	SEN	Ibrahima Seck (from Waasland-Beveren)

Out:

No.	Pos.	Nation	Player
—	MF	BEL	Yoni Buyens (to Lierse)
—	GK	HUN	László Köteles (released)
—	FW	BIH	Tino-Sven Sušić (was on loan to Maccabi Tel Aviv, now sold to Antwerp)

==== Gent ====
In:

No.	Pos.	Nation	Player
—	MF	DEN	Anders Christiansen (from Malmö)
—	FW	CUW	Rangelo Janga (from Trenčín)
—	DF	NOR	Sigurd Rosted (from Sarpsborg 08)
—	GK	BEL	Anthony Swolfs (from Mechelen)

Out:

No.	Pos.	Nation	Player
3	MF	BEL	Lucas Schoofs (on loan to NAC Breda)
8	MF	BEL	Thomas Matton (retired)
14	MF	SWE	Tesfaldet Tekie (on loan to Östersund)
15	MF	USA	Kenny Saief (on loan to Anderlecht)
25	MF	FRA	Damien Marcq (to Zulte Waregem)
33	MF	BEL	Louis Verstraete (on loan to Waasland-Beveren)
77	MF	BIH	Danijel Milićević (on loan to Metz)
—	MF	ISR	Lior Inbrum (was on loan to Maribor, now loaned to Ashdod)
—	DF	SEN	Noël Soumah (on loan to Westerlo)
—	FW	SRB	Darko Bjedov (on loan to Rad)

==== Kortrijk ====
In:

No.	Pos.	Nation	Player
—	DF	USA	Erik Palmer-Brown (on loan from Manchester City)
—	FW	GRE	Thanasis Papazoglou (loan return from Aalesund)

Out:

No.	Pos.	Nation	Player
10	MF	COD	Hervé Kage (on loan to Karabükspor)
12	MF	BEL	Lukas Van Eenoo (on loan to Westerlo)
—	DF	BEL	Lennert De Smul (on loan to Deinze)

==== Lokeren ====
In:

No.	Pos.	Nation	Player
—	MF	ECU	José Cevallos (from LDU Quito)
—	DF	CZE	Lukáš Mareček (from Sparta Prague)
—	FW	NOR	Jean Alassane Mendy (from Kristiansund)

Out:

No.	Pos.	Nation	Player
10	MF	FRA	Samy Kehli (on loan to OH Leuven)
19	DF	CRO	Mario Tičinović (on loan to Hajduk Split)
—	FW	BRA	Jajá Coelho (was on loan to Buriram United, now sold to Muangthong United)

==== Mechelen ====
In:

No.	Pos.	Nation	Player
—	DF	CIV	Mamadou Bagayoko (on loan from OH Leuven)
—	FW	MNE	Fatos Bećiraj (from Dynamo Moscow)
—	MF	BFA	Trova Boni (from Salitas)
—	MF	TUN	Fabien Camus (free agent)
—	DF	COL	Germán Mera (from Club Brugge)
—	FW	BFA	Abou Ouattara (from Salitas)
—	MF	MLI	Yacouba Sylla (from Rennes)
—	MF	FRA	Clément Tainmont (from Charleroi)
—	FW	FRA	Nicolas Verdier (from Eupen)

Out:

No.	Pos.	Nation	Player
10	MF	FRA	Yohan Croizet (to Kansas City)
17	DF	CRO	Ivan Tomečak (to Club Brugge)
21	MF	BEL	Jonathan Kindermans (on loan to Union SG)
28	GK	BEL	Anthony Swolfs (to Gent)
35	FW	CGO	Silvère Ganvoula (loan return to Anderlecht)
55	MF	SVN	Željko Filipović (released)
63	DF	MAR	Faycal Rherras (on loan to Hibernian)
99	FW	SRB	Stefan Dražić (released)
—	MF	CRO	Ljuban Crepulja (was on loan to Shakhtyor Soligorsk, now sold to Sarajevo)

==== Oostende ====
In:

No.	Pos.	Nation	Player
—	MF	BEL	Aristote Nkaka (from Excel Mouscron)

Out:

No.	Pos.	Nation	Player
7	MF	CMR	Sébastien Siani (to Antwerp)

==== Sint-Truiden ====
In:

No.	Pos.	Nation	Player
—	FW	ENG	Chuba Akpom (on loan from Arsenal)
—	DF	JPN	Takehiro Tomiyasu (from Avispa Fukuoka)

Out:

No.	Pos.	Nation	Player

==== Standard Liège ====
In:

No.	Pos.	Nation	Player
—	MF	MAR	Mehdi Carcela (on loan from Granada)
—	MF	BIH	Gojko Cimirot (from PAOK)
—	DF	GRE	Georgios Koutroumpis (from Panathinaikos)
—	DF	BEL	Zinho Vanheusden (on loan from Inter)

Out:

No.	Pos.	Nation	Player
10	MF	COD	Dieumerci Ndongala (on loan to Genk)
12	MF	BEL	Beni Badibanga (on loan to Lierse)
13	DF	DEN	Alexander Scholz (to Club Brugge)
24	DF	BEL	Corentin Fiore (to Palermo)
25	DF	SRB	Filip Mladenović (to Lechia Gdańsk)

==== Waasland-Beveren ====
In:

No.	Pos.	Nation	Player
—	MF	ALG	Rachid Aït-Atmane (on loan from Gijón)
—	DF	BEL	Daam Foulon (from Anderlecht)
—	MF	BEL	Niels Verburgh (on loan from Club Brugge)
—	MF	BEL	Louis Verstraete (on loan from Gent)

Out:

No.	Pos.	Nation	Player
15	MF	SEN	Ibrahima Seck (to Genk)
19	FW	DEN	Ronnie Schwartz (to Sarpsborg 08)
44	MF	JPN	Ryota Morioka (to Anderlecht)

==== Zulte-Waregem ====
In:

No.	Pos.	Nation	Player
—	GK	GER	Eike Bansen (from Borussia Dortmund II)
—	DF	NOR	Johan Lædre Bjørdal (from Rosenborg)
—	MF	BEL	Théo Bongonda (on loan from Celta de Vigo)
—	FW	TUN	Hamdi Harbaoui (from Anderlecht)
—	MF	FRA	Damien Marcq (from Gent)

Out:

No.	Pos.	Nation	Player
16	MF	ISR	Ben Reichert (on loan to Hapoel Acre)
17	MF	NGA	Aliko Bala (on loan to Hapoel Acre)
24	GK	ITA	Nicola Leali (loan return to Juventus)
30	MF	CYP	Grigoris Kastanos (loan return to Juventus)
95	FW	HAI	Andy Faustin (released)
—	FW	TOG	Charles Brym (to Lille)

=== Belgian First Division B teams ===
==== Beerschot Wilrijk ====
In:

No.	Pos.	Nation	Player
—	FW	EST	Rauno Sappinen (on loan from Flora)
—	MF	GHA	Collins Tanor (from Manchester City)

Out:

No.	Pos.	Nation	Player

==== Cercle Brugge ====
In:

No.	Pos.	Nation	Player
—	DF	NGA	Elderson Echiéjilé (on loan from Sivasspor)
—	MF	FRA	Kévin Hoggas (from Bourg-en-Bresse Péronnas)
—	DF	BRA	Xandão (from Gijón)

Out:

No.	Pos.	Nation	Player
10	MF	BEL	Stephen Buyl (on loan to Westerlo)
17	MF	FRA	Jonathan Mexique (loan return to Monaco)
18	MF	BRA	Vagner (released)
21	MF	FRA	Gaëtan Robail (loan return to Paris Saint-Germain)
32	DF	MNE	Aleksandar Šofranac (to Sarajevo)
—	MF	GUI	Amadou Diallo (to Red Star)
—	MF	BEL	Jessy Gálvez López (released)

==== Lierse ====
In:

No.	Pos.	Nation	Player
—	MF	BEL	Beni Badibanga (on loan from Standard Liège)
—	MF	BEL	Yoni Buyens (from Genk)

Out:

No.	Pos.	Nation	Player
21	MF	BEL	Sabir Bougrine (to Paris)
—	MF	BEL	Faysel Kasmi (to Waterford)

==== OH Leuven ====
In:

No.	Pos.	Nation	Player
—	MF	BEL	Joeri Dequevy (from Antwerp)
—	MF	FRA	Samy Kehli (on loan from Lokeren)
—	MF	GHA	Kamal Sowah (on loan from Leicester City)
—	GK	THA	Kawin Thamsatchanan (from Muangthong United)

Out:

No.	Pos.	Nation	Player
10	MF	BEL	Geert Berben (on loan to Oosterzonen Oosterwijk)
14	MF	BEL	Thomas Azevedo (on loan to Lommel)
18	DF	CIV	Mamadou Bagayoko (on loan to Mechelen)

==== Roeselare ====
In:

No.	Pos.	Nation	Player
—	MF	SEN	Souleymane Aw (on loan from Eupen)
—	FW	BEL	Ibrahim Kargbo Junior (free agent)
—	MF	MAD	Zotsara Randriambololona (on loan from Antwerp)

Out:

No.	Pos.	Nation	Player
12	FW	GAM	Ibou (to Tubize)
16	MF	BEL	Reno Wilmots (to Avellino)
20	FW	CRO	Fran Brodić (loan return to Club Brugge)

==== Tubize ====
In:

No.	Pos.	Nation	Player
—	MF	MAR	Karim Achahbar (on loan from Guingamp)
—	FW	GAM	Ibou (from Roeselare)
—	MF	SEN	Mohamed Kané (on loan from Metz)
—	MF	GHA	Divine Naah (on loan from Manchester City)
—	MF	GEO	Levan Shengelia (loan return from Daejeon Citizen)

Out:

No.	Pos.	Nation	Player
—	MF	JPN	Daisuke Sakai (loan return to Oita Trinita)

==== Union SG ====
In:

No.	Pos.	Nation	Player
—	FW	BEL	Nathan Kabasele (on loan from Gazişehir Gaziantep)
—	MF	BEL	Jonathan Kindermans (on loan from Mechelen)
—	MF	COL	Carlos Uhia (from Fortaleza)

Out:

No.	Pos.	Nation	Player
99	FW	BEL	Dylan Lambrecth (loan return to Anderlecht)

==== Westerlo ====
In:

No.	Pos.	Nation	Player
—	MF	BEL	Stephen Buyl (on loan from Cercle Brugge)
—	DF	SEN	Noël Soumah (on loan from Gent)
—	MF	BEL	Lukas Van Eenoo (on loan from Kortrijk)

Out:

No.	Pos.	Nation	Player
—	FW	BEL	Gillian Vaesen (on loan to Hoogstraten)
