= 2020–21 Belgian First Division B =

Fifth season of the Belgian First Division B

Belgian First Division B
- Season: 2020–21
- Champions: Union SG
- Promoted: Union SG; Seraing
- Relegated: none

The 2020–21 season of the Belgian First Division B began in August 2020 and ended in April 2021. Union SG became champions on 13 March 2021, returning to the highest level of Belgian football for the first time since the 1972–73 season.

== Team changes ==
=== In ===
- Deinze were promoted from the 2019–20 Belgian First Amateur Division as champions.
- Seraing and RWD Molenbeek filled in the open spots left by the extra relegations of Roeselare and Virton, as highest finishing teams which had obtained a professional footballing licence.
- As a result of the COVID-19 pandemic in Belgium, no team was relegated from the 2019–20 Belgian First Division A and two teams were promoted from the 2019–20 Belgian First Division B, meaning two extra teams needed to be added to the league. From the 2019–20 Belgian First Amateur Division only Lierse Kempenzonen remained as team which had obtained the necessary Belgian professional football licence (despite nearly relegating in that division), hence they were promoted and finally as no other team was eligible from that division, the youth squad of Club Brugge was added to again end up with 8 teams. This team will play under the name Club NXT.

=== Out ===
- Due to the Belgian First Division A expanding from 16 to 18 teams, both finalists Beerschot and OH Leuven were promoted to Belgian First Division A for the next season.
- Lokeren went bankrupt and folded. Temse moved to Lokeren and renamed themselves K.S.C. Lokeren-Temse playing in the Belgian Second Amateur Division.
- Both Roeselare and Virton were denied a professional licence and forced to relegate, Roeselare to the Belgian First Amateur Division, Virton to the Belgian Second Amateur Division as they were also refused a remunerated licence.

== Format changes ==
Only in the 2020–21 season, the league will no longer consist of two separate competitions but will be one single league in which all teams play each other four times. There will be no more playoffs, no teams will qualify for the Europa League playoffs and the bottom team will be relegated directly.

== Team information ==
=== Stadiums and locations ===
Locations of the 2020–21 Belgian First Division B teams

Matricule	Club	City	First season of current spell at second level	Coming from	2019-20 result	Stadium	Capacity
3	Club NXT	Brugge (Note: Club Brugge NXT is not playing its home matches at the same venue as the A-squad of Club Brugge (the Jan Breydel Stadium) but rather they will move to Lokeren, thus moving from West Flanders to East Flanders.)	2020–21	–	–	Daknamstadion	12,136
818	K.M.S.K. Deinze	Deinze	2020–21	Belgian First Amateur Division	1st (D1Am)	Burgemeester Van de Wiele Stadion	7,515
3970	Lierse Kempenzonen	Lier	2020–21	Belgian First Amateur Division	13th (D1Am)	Herman Vanderpoortenstadion	14,538
2554	Lommel SK	Lommel	2018–19	Belgian First Amateur Division	6th (D1B)	Soevereinstadion	8,000
5479	RWD Molenbeek	Molenbeek	2020–21	Belgian First Amateur Division	6th (D1Am)	Edmond Machtens Stadium	12,266
167	Seraing	Seraing	2020–21	Belgian First Amateur Division	4th (D1Am)	Stade du Pairay	14,234
10	Union SG	Saint-Gilles, Brussels	2015–16	Belgian Third Division	4th (D1B)	Stade Joseph Marien	5,500
2024	K.V.C. Westerlo	Westerlo	2017–18	Belgian First Division A	1st (D1B)	Het Kuipje	8,035

=== Personnel and kits ===
Club	Manager	Kit Manufacturer	Sponsors
Club NXT	(Belgium) Rik De Mil	Macron	Alheembouw
Deinze	(Belgium) Cédric Vlaeminck	Legea	Dakota Vastgoed & Declercq Stortbeton
Lierse Kempenzonen	(Belgium) Tom Van Imschoot	Jako	Keukens Van Lommel
Lommel	(England) Liam Manning	Masita	United Telecom
RWD Molenbeek	(Belgium) Vincent Euvrard	Joma	Symbio
RFC Seraing	(Belgium) Emilio Ferrera	Kappa	VOO, Willy Naessens & Startpeople
Union SG	(Belgium) Felice Mazzù	Le Coq Sportif	Culture et Formation
Westerlo	(Belgium) Bob Peeters	Saller	Soudal

=== Managerial changes ===
Team	Outgoing manager	Manner of departure	Date of vacancy	Position	Replaced by	Date of appointment
Union SG	(Spain) Thomas Christiansen	Contract not prolonged	End of 2019–20 season	Pre-season	(Belgium) Felice Mazzù	24 May 2020
Lommel	(Belgium) Peter Maes	Contract not prolonged	End of 2019–20 season	Pre-season	(England) Liam Manning	10 July 2020
RWD Molenbeek	(Belgium) Frédéric Stilmant (caretaker)	Caretaker replaced	End of 2019–20 season	Pre-season	(Belgium) Laurent Demol	11 June 2020
RWD Molenbeek	(Belgium) Laurent Demol	Sacked	2 December 2020	6th	(Belgium) Frédéric Stilmant (caretaker)	2 December 2020
RWD Molenbeek	(Belgium) Frédéric Stilmant (caretaker)	Caretaker replaced	7 December 2020	6th	(Belgium) Vincent Euvrard	7 December 2020
Deinze	(Belgium) David Gevaert	Sacked	4 March 2021	6th	(Belgium) Cédric Vlaeminck (caretaker) (Note: Wim De Decker was appointed the new manager of Deinze, but would only be observing and analysing the players for the remainder of the season. Assistant-manager Cédric Vlaeminck will take up the role of manager until the end of the season, leading the training sessions and being on the sideline during matches.)	4 March 2021

== League table ==
Pos	Team	Pld	W	D	L	GF	GA	GD	Pts	Qualification	USG	SER	LOM	WES	DEI	RWD	LIE	NXT	USG	SER	LOM	WES	DEI	RWD	LIE	NXT
1	Union SG (C, P)	28	22	4	2	69	24	+45	70	Promotion to the 2021–22 Belgian First Division A	—	3–2	4–2	0–0	3–0	2–1	5–0	6–0	—	2–0	3–2	2–1	2–2	2–1	2–1	3–1
2	Seraing (O, P)	28	16	4	8	54	37	+17	52	Qualification to Promotion play-off	1–0	—	1–0	0–2	3–2	0–1	1–3	6–1	0–2	—	5–0 FF (Note: Lommel forfeited the match against Seraing, thereby automatically losing the match 5–0. On the day of the match, Lommel had five players test positive for COVID-19, with twenty others (players and staff) required to go into quarantine as a result. The match can only be postponed in case 7 or more A-squad players test positive, however, the club chose to forfeit the match to prevent taking excessive risks and allowing the virus to spread further.)	1–1	1–0	1–0	0–0	2–1
3	Lommel	28	13	4	11	49	47	+2	43		0–1	3–5	—	1–1	1–2	4–0	3–2	3–1	0–2	1–3	—	1–0	4–2	3–2	2–1	2–1
4	Westerlo	28	10	13	5	41	30	+11	43		1–4	1–1	2–1	—	3–0 (Note: The match between Westerlo and Deinze was postponed due to the home team suffering from an excessive number of A-squad players being placed in quarantine following a positive COVID-19 test, initially from 20 September 2020 to 30 September 2020, but on 28 September the match was postponed again and eventually it was played on 18 November 2020.)	3–0 (Note: The match between Westerlo and RWDM47 was postponed from 1 October 2020 to 9 November 2020, due to the home team suffering from an excessive number of A-squad players being placed in quarantine following a positive COVID-19 test.)	0–0	2–1	2–2	4–3	1–1	—	4–0	2–2	2–0	1–1
5	Deinze	28	10	9	9	45	46	−1	39		0–2	3–0 (Note: The match between Deinze and Seraing was postponed from 1 November 2020 to 15 November 2020 due to the home team suffering from an excessive number of A-squad players being placed in quarantine following a positive COVID-19 test.)	1–1	2–2	—	1–0	2–1	1–0	2–4	0–0	2–1	0–1	—	4–4 (Note: Due to expected severe weather conditions involving excessive snow, the matches Club NXT-Westerlo and Deinze-RWDM of 7 February 2021 were postponed the day before. Club NXT-Westerlo was eventually played on 3 March 2021, while Deinze-RWDM was played on 18 March 2021.)	3–0	4–0
6	RWDM47	28	10	5	13	44	48	−4	35		3–1	3–4	0–1	3–1	1–1	—	2–0 (Note: The match between RWDM47 and Lierse Kempenzonen of 24 October 2020 was postponed to 14 November 2020 due to the home team suffering from an excessive number of A-squad players being placed in quarantine following a positive COVID-19 test.)	2–0	0–2	2–4 (Note: Due to excessive snow and cold, the pitch of RWDM was deemed unsuitable for football on 12 February 2021, resulting in postponement of the match against Seraing which was originally scheduled to be played two days later. The match was eventually played on 3 March 2021.)	2–5	2–1	1–1	—	1–0	1–1
7	Lierse Kempenzonen (Note: Normally, the team finishing in last place (except Club NXT which is ineligible for promotion/relegation) would have been relegated. However, the general meeting of the Pro League decided on 16 March that no team would be relegated, as the 2020–21 Belgian National Division 1 had been cancelled due to measures taken by the Belgian government against the spread of COVID-19 prohibiting amateur football, causing no team to be promoted from that league to fill the gap.)	28	4	4	20	25	54	−29	16		0–2	2–5	1–3	0–1	3–4	4–2	—	2–1	1–3	0–1	0–1	0–0	1–1	0–3	—	3–1
8	Club NXT (Y)	28	2	7	19	23	64	−41	13	Not eligible for promotion or relegation Leave the league due to Virton's readmission.	1–1	0–4	2–2	1–1 (Note: The match between Club NXT and Westerlo was postponed from 25 September 2020 to 14 November 2020 due to the away team suffering from an excessive number of A-squad players being placed in quarantine following a positive COVID-19 test.)	1–1	0–2	2–0	—	0–4	0–1	0–2	1–1	2–4	1–3	2–0	—

Source: Belgian First Division B
Rules for classification: 1) Points; 2) Matches won; 3) Goal difference; 4) Goals scored; 5) Away goals scored; 6) Away matches won; 7) Play-off.
(C) Champions; (O) Play-off winners; (P) Promoted; (Y) Cannot get promoted or relegated

== Season statistics ==
=== Top scorers ===
Rank	Player	Club	Goals
1	(Georgia (country)) Georges Mikautadze	Seraing	19
1	(Belgium) Dante Vanzeir	Union SG	19
3	(Germany) Deniz Undav	Union SG	17
4	(Turkey) Atabey Çiçek	Westerlo	12
5	(Belgium) Lennart Mertens	Deinze	10
5	(Costa Rica) Manfred Ugalde	Lommel	10
7	(Belgium) Youssef Challouk	Deinze	8
7	(France) Kévin Mata	RWDM47	8
7	(Angola) Igor Vetokele	Westerlo	8
10	(Belgium) Dylan De Belder	Deinze	7
10	(Portugal) Leandro Rocha	RWDM47	7
10	(Belgium) Nicolas Rommens	RWDM47	7
10	(Belgium) Alessio Staelens	Deinze	7
10	(Belgium) Lukas Van Eenoo	Westerlo	7
10	(Belgium) Anass Zaroury	Lommel	7

6 goals (5 players)
- (Belgium) Thibo Baeten (Club NXT)
- (Togo) Euloge Placca Fessou (Lierse Kempenzonen)
- (Belgium) Glenn Claes (RWDM47)
- (Morocco) Abdelhafid Al Badaoui (Seraing)
- (France) Brighton Labeau (Union SG)
5 goals (7 players)
- (Belgium) Maxim De Cuyper (Club NXT)
- (Morocco) Ayyoub Allach (Lierse Kempenzonen)
- (Belgium) Kevin Kis (Lommel)
- (Colombia) Marlos Moreno (Lommel)
- (Belgium) Antoine Bernier (Seraing)
- (The Gambia) Ablie Jallow (Seraing)
- (Malta) Teddy Teuma (Union SG)
4 goals (6 players)
- (Belgium) Mehdi Tarfi (Deinze)
- (Serbia) Sava Petrov (Lierse Kempenzonen)
- (Belgium) Glenn Neven (Lommel)
- (Armenia) Ivan Yagan (RWDM47)
- (Senegal) Amadou Dia N'Diaye (Seraing)
- (Denmark) Casper Nielsen (Union SG)
3 goals (6 players)
- (Belgium) Jo Gilis (Lierse Kempenzonen)
- (Belgium) Emile Samyn (Lierse Kempenzonen)
- (Nigeria) Jordan Kadiri (Lommel)
- (Belgium) Arno Verschueren (Lommel)
- (Iceland) Aron Sigurðarson (Union SG)
- (Belgium) Christian Brüls (Westerlo)
2 goals (22 players)
- (Belgium) Mathis Servais (Club NXT)
- (Belgium) Thomas Van Den Keybus (Club NXT)
- (Belgium) Ignace Van der Brempt (Club NXT)
- (France) Bafodé Dansoko (Deinze)
- (France) Raphaël Lecomte (Deinze)
- (Belgium) Sebastiaan Brebels (Lommel)
- (Argentina) Bautista Cejas (Lommel)
- (Belgium) Jonathan Hendrickx (Lommel)
- (Iceland) Kolbeinn Þórðarson (Lommel)
- (France) Corenthyn Lavie (RWDM47)
- (France) Benjamin Boulenger (Seraing)
- (Senegal) Moussa Gueye (Seraing)
- (France) Gerald Kilota (Seraing)
- (France) Théo Pierrot (Seraing)
- (Denmark) Jonas Bager (Union SG)
- (England) Christian Burgess (Union SG)
- (Belgium) Mathias Fixelles (Union SG)
- (Madagascar) Loïc Lapoussin (Union SG)
- (Belgium) Siebe Van der Heyden (Union SG)
- (South Africa) Kurt Abrahams (Westerlo)
- (France) Kader Keïta (Westerlo)
- (Belgium) Kyan Vaesen (Westerlo)
1 goal (38 players)
- (Belgium) Noah Aelterman (Club NXT)
- (Senegal) Youssouph Mamadou Badji (Club NXT)
- (Belgium) Arne Engels (Club NXT)
- (Venezuela) Daniel Pérez (Club NXT)
- (Belgium) Cisse Sandra (Club NXT)
- (Belgium) Romeo Vermant (Club NXT)
- (Belgium) Siebe Blondelle (Deinze)
- (Belgium) Michiel De Looze (Deinze)
- (Belgium) Seth De Witte (Deinze)
- (France) Flavien Le Postollec (Deinze)
- (Republic of the Congo) Scott Bitsindou (Lierse Kempenzonen)
- (Belgium) Bob Straetman (Lierse Kempenzonen)
- (Belgium) Yentl Van Genechten (Lierse Kempenzonen)
- (Belgium) Jellert van Landschoot (Lierse Kempenzonen)
- (Belgium) Robin Henkens (Lommel)
- (Belgium) Laurent Lemoine (Lommel)
- (Belgium) Stijn Wuytens (Lommel)
- (Mali) Abdoul Karim Danté (RWDM47)
- (Belgium) Joeri Dequevy (RWDM47)
- (Belgium) Maxime Electeur (RWDM47)
- (France) Thomas Ephestion (RWDM47)
- (France) Florian Le Joncour (RWDM47)
- (Belgium) Jarno Libert (RWDM47)
- (Belgium) Tracy Mpati (RWDM47)
- (Guadeloupe) Lenny Nangis (RWDM47)
- (Algeria) Mehdi Terki (RWDM47)
- (Argentina) Marcos Maydana (Seraing)
- (Belgium) Mohamed Mouhli (Seraing)
- (Belgium) Sami Lahssaini (Seraing)
- (Guinea) Ibrahima Bah (Union SG)
- (Belgium) Guillaume François (Union SG)
- (Belgium) Senne Lynen (Union SG)
- (Turkey) Barış Alıcı (Westerlo)
- (Belgium) Maxime Biset (Westerlo)
- (Belgium) Tuur Dierckx (Westerlo)
- (Belgium) Pietro Perdichizzi (Westerlo)
- (France) Ange-Freddy Plumain (Westerlo)
- (Senegal) Noël Soumah (Westerlo)
1 own goal (4 players)
- (Belgium) Ibe Hautekiet (Club NXT, scored for RWDM47)
- (Belgium) Nick Shinton (Club NXT, scored for Union SG)
- (France) Florian Le Joncour (RWDM47, scored for Lommel)
- (Morocco) Yahya Nadrani (Seraing, scored for Union SG)

=== Top assists ===
Rank	Player	Club	Goals
1	(Belgium) Youssef Challouk	Deinze	10
2	(Belgium) Christian Brüls	Westerlo	7
2	(Belgium) Kevin Kis	Lommel	7
2	(Denmark) Casper Nielsen	Union SG	7
2	(Belgium) Alessio Staelens	Deinze	7
2	(Belgium) Dante Vanzeir	Union SG	7

=== Clean sheets ===
Rank	Player	Club	Goals
1	(Luxembourg) Anthony Moris	Union SG	10
2	(France) Guillaume Dietsch	Seraing	9
3	(Turkey) Berke Özer	Westerlo	8
4	(Belgium) Anthony Sadin	RWDM47	5
5	(France) William Dutoit	Deinze	4

=== Team of the season ===
Upon completion of the regular season a team of the season award was compiled, based upon the results of the team of the week results throughout the season, constructed based on nominations from managers, assistant-managers, journalists and analysts. The results were announced from 4 May 2021, with one player revealed each day.

Pos		Player	Club	Ref
GK	(Belgium)	Anthony Sadin	RWDM47	
RB	(Belgium)	Iebe Swers	Seraing	
CB	(Senegal)	Noël Soumah	Westerlo	
CB	(England)	Christian Burgess	Union SG	
LB	(France)	Gerald Kilota	Seraing	
RW	(Colombia)	Marlos Moreno	Lommel	
MF	(Denmark)	Casper Nielsen	Union SG	
MF	(Malta)	Teddy Teuma	Union SG	
LW	(Belgium)	Youssef Challouk	Deinze	
FW	(Belgium)	Dante Vanzeir	Union SG	
FW	(Georgia (country))	Georges Mikautadze	Seraing	

== Number of teams by provinces ==
While Club NXT is a team from West Flanders, they are playing their home matches in Lokeren, which is located in East Flanders.

Number of teams	Province or region	Team(s)
2	Antwerp	Lierse Kempenzonen and Westerlo
2	Brussels	RWD Molenbeek and Union SG
1	East Flanders	Deinze
1	Liège	Seraing
1	Limburg	Lommel
1	West Flanders	Club NXT
