= Ilian Mhand =

Belgian footballer (born 2005)

Personal information
- Full name: Ilian Mhand Yamna
- Date of birth: 24 May 2005 (age 21)
- Place of birth: Brussels, Belgium
- Height: 1.80 m (5 ft 11 in)
- Position: Attacking midfielder

Team information
- Current team: Paris Saint-Germain

Youth career
- Dender
- 2022–2024: Deinze
- 2025–: Paris Saint-Germain

Senior career*
| Years | Team | Apps | (Gls) |
| 2024 | Deinze | 3 | (0) |
- * Club domestic league appearances and goals as of 1 July 2025

Ilian Mhand Yamna (born 24 May 2005) is a Belgian footballer who plays as a midfielder for Paris Saint-Germain.

== Club career ==
Born in Brussels, Mhand is a youth product of FCV Dender EH and KMSK Deinze, where he started his senior career in the Challenger Pro League.

Already featuring in a senior squad that fought for the Belgian Pro League promotion during the 2022–23 season, Mhand made his professional debut with Deinze, starting a 3–0 Challenger Pro League loss to the Francs Borains on 23 November 2024.

He played 2 other games as a starter under Mikhail Turi in Belgium, but was left without a club in December 2024 when the club went into administration. This led him to a trial with Paris Saint-Germain by the following spring, starting and impressing in two friendlies with the U23 team, against Paris 13 and Lille.

In June 2025, he signed his first professional contract with the recent European champions, a two-years deal that made him only the second Belgian to join the Parisian club, after Thomas Meunier.

== International career ==
Born in Belgium, Mhand also has Moroccan origins, qualifying for the two nations.

== Style of play ==
Mhand has been described as a hard-working left-footed player with great technique, vision and percussion, able to easily beat the opponent in tiny spaces.

Described to be offensively versatile, he is able to play both as an attacking midfielder or a winger.
