= Noah Jauny =

Irish footballer (born 2004)

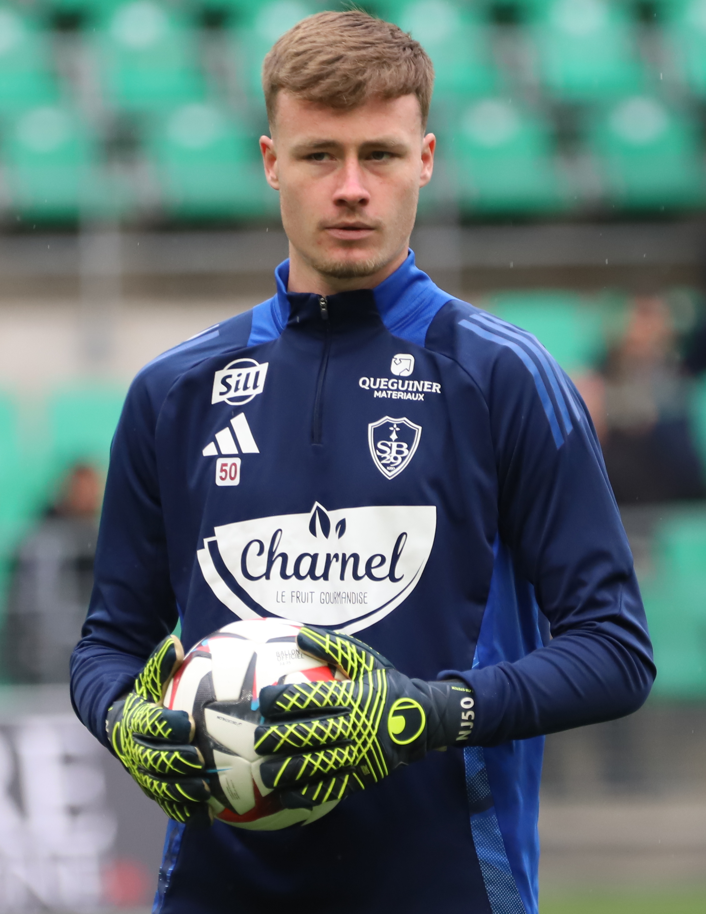

Personal information
- Date of birth: 26 August 2004 (age 22)
- Place of birth: Dublin, Republic of Ireland
- Height: 1.94 m (6 ft 4 in)
- Position: Goalkeeper

Team information
- Current team: Francs Borains

Youth career
- 2008–2016: Home Farm
- 2016–2020: Shamrock Rovers
- 2020–2024: Brest

Senior career*
Years	Team	Apps	(Gls)
2021–2026	Brest II	29	(0)
2024–2026	Brest	0	(0)
2026–	Francs Borains	0	(0)

International career^{‡}
2021	Republic of Ireland U18	1	(0)
2024–2026	Republic of Ireland U21	15	(0)
- * Club domestic league appearances and goals as of 00:10, 18 November 2026 (UTC) ‡ National team caps and goals as of 17:54, 31 March 2026 (UTC)

Noah Jauny (born 26 August 2004) is an Irish footballer who plays as a goalkeeper for Belgian Challenger Pro League club Francs Borains.

== Club career ==
Jauny was born on 26 August 2004 in Dublin, Republic of Ireland. He is the son of French footballer Stephane Jauny. He operates as a goalkeeper. He is right-footed. He started playing football at the age of four. As a youth player, he joined the youth academy of Irish side Shamrock Rovers from Home Farm at the age of twelve. He received interest from the youth academy of English Premier League side Everton while playing for them.

After that, he joined the youth academy of French side Brest. He joined the club at the age of sixteen. He started his senior career with them. He was described as having "solid performances with the Stade Brestois reserve team" while playing for them. On 7 August 2024, he signed his first professional contract with the club until 2025, with the option to extend for two more seasons.

== International career ==
Jauny is a former Republic of Ireland youth international. He made one appearance while playing for the Republic of Ireland U18 side in 2021. In November 2024, he received his first call up to the Republic of Ireland U21 squad for their two friendlies against Sweden U21 in Marbella, Spain. He made his debut in a 2–0 defeat to Sweden on 14 November 2024.
