= Levi Malungu =

Belgian footballer

Personal information
- Date of birth: 12 June 2002 (age 24)
- Place of birth: Belgium
- Height: 1.87 m (6 ft 2 in)
- Position: Defender

Team information
- Current team: Francs Borains
- Number: 23

Senior career*
Years	Team	Apps	(Gls)
2021–2022	Charleroi	1	(0)
2022	→ MVV (loan)	3	(0)
2022–2023	Zébra Élites	21	(0)
2023–	Francs Borains	60	(1)

International career^{‡}
2017	Belgium U16	1	(0)
- * Club domestic league appearances and goals as of 20 April 2026 ‡ National team caps and goals as of 11 February 2021

Levi Malungu (born 12 June 2002) is a Belgian professional footballer who plays as a defender for Francs Borains.

== Club career ==
Malungu made his professional debut with Charleroi in a 3–1 Belgian First Division A win over Kortrijk on 30 January 2021.

On 31 January 2022, Malungu joined MVV in the Netherlands on loan until the end of the 2021–22 season.

In the summer of 2023, Malungu signed with Francs Borains in the Challenger Pro League.
