= Nicolas Verdier =

French footballer (born 1987)

Personal information
- Date of birth: 17 January 1987 (age 39)
- Place of birth: Nice, France
- Height: 1.85 m (6 ft 1 in)
- Position: Striker

Senior career*
Years	Team	Apps	(Gls)
2004–2008	Cannes	15	(2)
2008–2009	Draguignan		
2009	Boulogne	0	(0)
2009–2010	Cagnes-sur-Mer		
2010–2011	Arles-Avignon	0	(0)
2011–2013	Gazélec Ajaccio	67	(21)
2013–2015	Brest	46	(14)
2015–2017	Mechelen	82	(18)
2017–2018	Eupen	16	(1)
2018	→ Mechelen (loan)	6	(0)
2018–2019	Laval	21	(3)
2019–2020	Red Star	13	(2)
2020–2021	Cannes	2	(0)
2021–2022	AS de l'Esterel		
- * Club domestic league appearances and goals as of 12:07, 21 July 2020 (UTC)

Nicolas Verdier (born 17 January 1987) is a French professional footballer who plays as a striker.

== Career ==
Verdier started his career at Cannes and made his debut for the club on 20 May 2005, coming on as a second-half substitute for Stéphane Calcé in the 0–1 away defeat at Pau. He scored his first senior goal on 10 February 2006, scoring the third in the 3–1 home win over Nîmes after replacing Madjid Bouabdallah. In total, Verdier played 15 league matches for Cannes before being released in 2008 and subsequently joining Division d'Honneur club Draguignan. In January 2009, he was signed by Boulogne, but failed to make an appearance for the side and left in the summer of that year.

Verdier spent the 2009–10 season with seventh-tier outfit Cagnes-sur-Mer before joining Arles-Avignon ahead of the 2010–11 campaign. He made a number of appearances for the reserve team at Arles but could not break into the first-team squad and was consequently released and signed for Championnat National outfit Gazélec Ajaccio in the summer of 2011. Verdier made his Gazélec debut in the goalless draw with Quevilly on 26 August 2011, playing the first hour before being replaced by Quentin Boesso. He scored his first goal for the club in the 1–0 win over Colmar three games later and became a first-team regular during the 2011–12 season, scoring 14 goals in 33 league matches as the team won promotion to Ligue 2. In the 2012–13 season he scored 4 goals in 23 league appearances. He played in Ligue 2 again in the 2013–14 season, having joined newly relegated side Stade Brestois 29.

In July 2018, he signed a contract with Stade Lavallois. In June 2019, he signed for Red Star.
