= Souleymane Aw =

Senegalese footballer

Personal information
- Full name: Souleymane Aw
- Date of birth: 5 April 1999 (age 27)
- Place of birth: Guinguinéo, Senegal
- Height: 1.75 m (5 ft 9 in)
- Position: Left back

Youth career
- Aspire Academy

Senior career*
Years	Team	Apps	(Gls)
2017–2019	Eupen	1	(0)
2018	→ Roeselare (loan)	6	(1)
2019–2020	Béziers	6	(0)
2020–2021	Gil Vicente	0	(0)
2024-	FK Robstav	0	(0)

International career^{‡}
2017–2019	Senegal U20	21	(0)
- * Club domestic league appearances and goals as of 2 February 2021 ‡ National team caps and goals as of 8 June 2019

Souleymane Aw (born 5 April 1999) is a Senegalese footballer.

== Career ==
Born in Senegal, Aw began playing youth football at the Aspire Academy in his home country. He signed a professional contract with Eupen in June 2017.

On 14 August 2019, he joined French club Béziers.

== International ==
He represented his country at the 2017 Africa U-20 Cup of Nations, 2017 FIFA U-20 World Cup, 2019 Africa U-20 Cup of Nations and 2019 FIFA U-20 World Cup.
