= Brahim Ghalidi =

Belgian footballer (born 2005)

Personal information
- Date of birth: 31 January 2005 (age 21)
- Place of birth: Belgium
- Height: 1.74 m (5 ft 9 in)
- Position: Forward

Team information
- Current team: NAC Breda
- Number: 55

Youth career
- Anderlecht
- 2015–2018: Union SG
- 2018–2020: Sint-Truiden
- 2020–2022: Standard Liège

Senior career*
Years	Team	Apps	(Gls)
2022–2025	Standard Liège	3	(0)
2022–2025	SL16 FC	59	(9)
2025–	NAC Breda	10	(0)

International career^{‡}
2020	Belgium U15	3	(1)
2021–2022	Belgium U17	7	(0)
2023–2024	Morocco U20	6	(1)
- * Club domestic league appearances and goals as of 21 May 2026 ‡ National team caps and goals as of 18:45, 10 October 2024 (UTC)

Brahim Ghalidi (Arabic: براهيم غاليدي; born 31 January 2005) is a professional footballer who plays as a forward for Dutch Eerste Divisie club NAC Breda. Born in Belgium, he represented Belgium up to under-17 level and Morocco at under-20 level.

== Club career ==
In 2020, Ghalidi joined Standard Liège from Sint-Truiden, having earlier played for Anderlecht and Union SG. After taking part in a winter training camp with the first team, he signed a contract of undisclosed length in January 2022, aged 16.

On 10 April 2022, Ghalidi made his debut in the Belgian Pro League, in a 3–0 loss away to his previous club. He came on as a substitute in the 64th minute.

It was reported by French website Foot Mercato in October 2023 that Ghalidi was being tracked by the Big Three of Turkish football, namely Galatasaray, Fenerbahçe and Beşiktaş. In November, leading Standard's reserve team for goals and assists in the third-tier Belgian National Division 1, Ghalidi signed a new contract to last until 2026. He returned to the first team the following 5 May in a 3–1 loss at OH Leuven, again from the bench.

On 8 July 2025, Ghalidi signed a three-year contract with NAC Breda in the Netherlands, with a club option to extend for two more years.

== International career ==
Ghalidi represented Belgium up to under-17 level. He was later called up for Morocco at under-20 level, scoring on his debut on 15 October 2023 in a 4–3 loss to Ukraine.
