= Anthony Sadin =

Belgian footballer (born 1989)

Personal information
- Full name: Anthony Dominique Sadin
- Date of birth: 24 January 1989 (age 37)
- Place of birth: La Louvière, Belgium
- Height: 1.88 m (6 ft 2 in)
- Position: Goalkeeper

Youth career
- –2008: FC Brussels

Senior career*
Years	Team	Apps	(Gls)
2008–2017	Union SG	156	(0)
2017–2021	RWDM47	75	(0)
2021–2023	Virton	28	(0)
2023–2024	Swift Hesperange	0	(0)
- * Club domestic league appearances and goals as of 2 October 2023

Anthony Dominique Sadin (born 24 January 1989) is a Belgian professional footballer who plays as a goalkeeper.
