= Jens Teunckens =

Belgian footballer (born 1998)

Personal information
- Full name: Jens Teunckens
- Date of birth: 30 January 1998 (age 28)
- Place of birth: Geel, Belgium
- Height: 1.86 m (6 ft 1 in)
- Position: Goalkeeper

Senior career*
Years	Team	Apps	(Gls)
2015–2018	Club Brugge	0	(0)
2018	→ Antwerp (loan)	2	(0)
2018–2020	Antwerp	2	(0)
2020–2021	AEK Larnaca	9	(0)
2021	RKC Waalwijk	0	(0)
2022–2025	Lierse	40	(0)
2025–2026	Union SG	0	(0)

International career
2013	Belgium U15	4	(0)
2013–2014	Belgium U16	9	(0)
2014–2015	Belgium U17	21	(0)
2016–2017	Belgium U19	4	(0)
2018	Belgium U21	2	(0)
- * Club domestic league appearances and goals as of 24 May 2026

Jens Teunckens (born 30 January 1998) is a Belgian professional footballer who plays as a goalkeeper.

== Club career ==
A youth product of Club Brugge, Teunckens joined Antwerp on loan in 2018, and joined Antwerp permanently when the loan ended. Teunckens made his professional debut for Antwerp in a 2-1 Belgian First Division A win over K.A.S. Eupen on 9 May 2019.

On 31 August 2021, he joined RKC Waalwijk in the Netherlands on a one-year contract. In January 2022, Teunckens had his contract annulled and joined Belgian second-tier side Lierse.

On 9 October 2025, Teunckens joined Union SG until the end of the 2025–26 season.

== International career ==
Teunckens was called up by the senior Belgium squad in October 2019 for a UEFA Euro 2020 qualifier against Kazakhstan.

== Honours ==
Individual

- 2015 UEFA European Under-17 Championship Team of the Tournament
