= Gerald Kilota =

French footballer (born 1994)

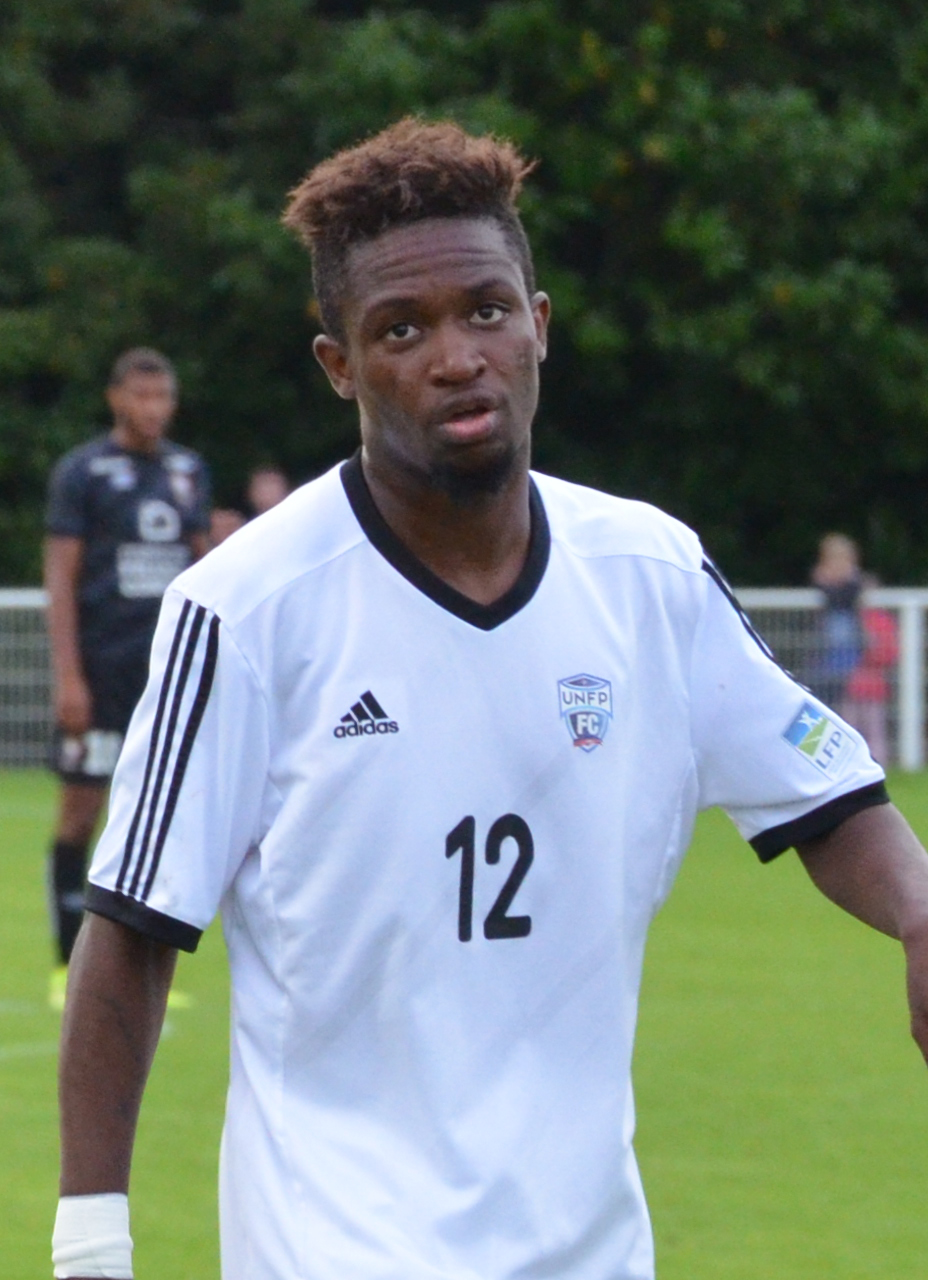
- Kilota in 2016

Personal information
- Date of birth: 2 January 1994 (age 32)
- Place of birth: Saint-Denis, France
- Height: 1.70 m (5 ft 7 in)
- Position: Defender

Youth career
- –2012: Caen

Senior career*
Years	Team	Apps	(Gls)
2011–2013	Caen B	20	(0)
2013–2016	Clermont B	44	(1)
2014–2016	Clermont	6	(0)
2016–2024	Seraing	184	(7)
2024–2025	Al-Quwa Al-Jawiya	9	(0)
- * Club domestic league appearances and goals as of 20 December 2024 @ 17:15(AEST)

Gerald Kilota (born 2 January 1994) is a French professional footballer who plays as a defender.

== Club career ==
Kilota joined Clermont Foot in 2012 from Caen. He made his Ligue 2 debut at 30 August 2013 against Créteil.
