= KMSK Deinze =

Former association football club in Deinze, Belgium

Deinze
- Full name: Koninklijke Maatschappij Sportkring Deinze
- Short name: Deinze
- Founded: 12 March 1926; 100 years ago
- Dissolved: 11 December 2024
- Ground: Dakota Arena; Deinze
- Capacity: 7,515
- Final season; 2024–25: 16th of 16 in Challenger Pro League, record expunged
Home colours	Away colours	Third colours

Koninklijke Maatschappij Sportkring Deinze, commonly known as KMSK Deinze or simply Deinze, was a Belgian football club from Deinze in East Flanders. It was founded on 12 March 1926 and was registered with the Royal Belgian Football Association (KBVB) under matricule 818. The club played in orange and black and used the Dakota Arena, formerly the Burgemeester Van de Wielestadion.

Deinze spent most of its history in the provincial and lower national divisions. It took the royal title in 1952 and reached the national divisions for the first time in 1954. The club won the First Amateur Division in the 2019–20 season and returned to professional football after an absence of more than two decades.

The Ghent enterprise court declared the club bankrupt on 11 December 2024 after the withdrawal of its Singaporean owner and a failed rescue takeover. Deinze was not refounded. In December 2025 the neighbouring club KFC Sparta Petegem took the city's name and continued its footballing identity as Sparta Petegem Deinze.

== History ==
=== Foundation and early years ===
The club was founded on 12 March 1926 by the children's car manufacturer Emile Torck. Recognition by the Belgian Football Association followed on 20 March, and the club was assigned matricule 818 as SK Deinze. Torck's son Georges and the garage owner Albert Van Den Poel were also prominent in the foundation. The team played on a site near the Astenedreef, close to the Deinze town forest. In the following years Deinze played mostly in the higher provincial series.

Activities were interrupted in 1940 and the ground was turned into a scrapyard. The association expanded during World War II under chairman Georges Torck and vice-chairman Achiel De Clercq, adding hockey, swimming and table tennis. Football resumed from 1946.

Deinze took the royal title in 1952 and became Koninklijke Maatschappij Sportkring (KMSK) Deinze. It won promotion to the national divisions for the first time in 1954, entering the newly created Fourth Division.

=== Rise through the national divisions ===
The team moved in 1978 to the new Burgemeester Van de Wielestadion in De Brielmeersen, which had been laid out by the city council. Deinze was relegated to the provincial divisions in 1981. It won the provincial championship the following season and never played provincial football again.

Georges Torck stepped down as chairman in 1988 and was succeeded by the chief executive Marc Hoste. Deinze won consecutive championships in 1992 and 1993 and reached the Second Division. The club reached the promotion final round in 1997 under Eddy Mestdagh but did not go up.

Deinze was relegated to the Third Division at the end of the 2008–09 season and spent six seasons there. It reached the promotion final round in the 2009–10 season and lost to ROC de Charleroi-Marchienne. The club qualified again three years later on the strength of a period title despite finishing thirteenth, and lost to KRC Mechelen. A further final round in the 2013–14 season ended in defeat to Union Saint-Gilloise. Promotion to the second tier followed in 2015, and Deinze was relegated again a year later.

The 2016 league reform placed Deinze in the First Amateur Division, the third tier. The club bought the Burgemeester Van de Wielestadion from the city for €521,000 in 2017.

Deinze led the First Amateur Division by a wide margin when the 2019–20 season was curtailed by the COVID-19 pandemic on 12 March 2020. The Belgian FA confirmed the club as champions on 27 March and Deinze was promoted to the second tier for the 2020–21 season.

=== Foreign ownership and stadium dispute ===
The ground was renamed the Dakota Arena in November 2021 after the property company Dakota Vastgoed. Chairman Denijs Van De Weghe then announced that he had found a buyer for the club. The Singaporean investment firm ACA Football Partners completed its takeover of Deinze Football Club NV and presented its plans at a press conference on 1 February 2022. The firm ran Deinze as part of a multi-club ownership model.

A long-running stadium dispute shadowed the club throughout this period. Plans for a new 8,200-capacity complex with a hotel, apartments, a medical centre and a concert hall were held up by a legal complaint. A temporary stand built to satisfy professional licensing conditions could not be brought into use because of a second complaint. On paper the club briefly had too few seats to stage home matches in Deinze, and a temporary move to Le Canonnier in Mouscron was considered.

=== Collapse ===
ACA Football Partners stopped funding the club early in the 2024–25 season. On 11 October 2024 Deinze announced that exclusive negotiations had taken place between ACA Football Partners and a European investment group, and that the club's future was secure. The Luxembourg-based AAD Invest Group, fronted by Doudou Cissé, took over in November and promised to assume the existing debts.

Payment dates were repeatedly postponed. The licensing commission deducted three points on 12 November 2024 for unpaid player wages, and the club was given a transfer ban. Several players left after a strike and formal notices of default. Creditors took the club to court.

A writ had been served on 30 September 2024 seeking a declaration of bankruptcy. At a hearing on 26 November the administrators reported that the new director had announced a significant payment. At a further hearing on 10 December they reported that no payment had been received. The Ghent enterprise court declared Deinze Football Club NV bankrupt on 11 December 2024, finding that the company had permanently ceased to pay and that its credit was damaged. Two trustees were appointed to wind up the estate.

The Challenger Pro League was reduced to fifteen clubs for the remainder of the season. All points won against Deinze were scrapped, the fixture against KAS Eupen was cancelled, and only one club was relegated at the end of the campaign. The forward Tuur Dierckx told local media that it was extraordinary that a project could be shut down mid-season and that many people had been left out in the cold.

== Aftermath ==
The Dakota Arena stood empty after the bankruptcy. In January 2025 the stadium owner reached an agreement with the city of Deinze and Anderlecht under which the club's reserve and women's teams would play there for the remainder of the season. At the request of the city, Deinze season-ticket holders were admitted free. Mayor Rutger De Reu called the arrangement temporary and said he hoped a local club would one day play in the stadium again. Anderlecht later agreed a three-year lease.

In July 2025 the Council of State annulled the planning permission for the temporary stand following a complaint by a neighbouring landowner. Without the stand the ground no longer met professional licensing requirements.

Deinze was not refounded and there was no interest in restarting a side in the fourth provincial division. The club would have marked its centenary in 2026. On 11 December 2025, a year to the day after the bankruptcy, Sparta Petegem announced that it would play as KFC Sparta Petegem Deinze from the 2026–27 season. Figures from Deinze joined the Sparta board, and the former Deinze youth site at the Brielmeersen became the central training base for around 440 young players. Co-chairman Bernard Vermeulen said the arrangement offered the best chance of keeping football in the city without restarting KMSK Deinze.

== Ground ==
Deinze played at the Burgemeester Van de Wielestadion from 1978. The ground was built in 1976 and was renamed the Dakota Arena in November 2021. It had 792 seats, 1,300 covered standing places and 5,425 uncovered standing places, giving a nominal capacity of 7,515. The usable capacity was reduced to 3,482 during the licensing dispute, which left the club below the thresholds required for professional football.

== Honours ==
- Belgian First Amateur Division
  - Winners: 2019–20

== Final squad ==
As of 14 December 2024

Note: Flags indicate national team as defined under FIFA eligibility rules; some limited exceptions apply. Players may hold more than one non-FIFA nationality.

No.	Pos.	Nation	Player
4	MF	ESP	Jaime Sierra
5	DF	ENG	Reece Welch (on loan from Everton)
6	MF	BEL	Steve De Ridder
11	MF	FRA	Zakaria Fdaouch
13	DF	UKR	Denys Prychynenko
14	FW	MKD	Erdon Daci
17	DF	BEL	Jannes Vansteenkiste
19	FW	CIV	Mamadou Koné
20	FW	ESP	Iker Burgos

No.	Pos.	Nation	Player
21	MF	BEL	Thibaut Van Acker
25	DF	BEL	Andreas Spegelaere
26	MF	BEL	Ilian Mhand
28	GK	FRA	William Dutoit
30	MF	SUR	Dhoraso Klas
31	GK	ESP	Nacho Miras
56	GK	BEL	Simon Vervacke
77	DF	ESP	Gonzalo Almenara
91	GK	TUN	Dries Arfaoui
