= Théo Pierrot =

French footballer (born 1994)

Personal information
- Date of birth: 1 January 1994 (age 32)
- Place of birth: Nancy, France
- Height: 1.85 m (6 ft 1 in)
- Position: Midfielder

Youth career
- Metz

Senior career*
Years	Team	Apps	(Gls)
2011–2015	Metz B	65	(4)
2015–2022	Seraing	161	(13)
2022–2024	Lommel	34	(2)
2023–2024	→ Patro Eisden Maasmechelen (loan)	19	(1)
2024–2026	RFC Liège	22	(1)
- * Club domestic league appearances and goals as of 31 January 2026

Théo Pierrot (born 1 January 1994) is a French professional footballer who plays as a midfielder.

== Career ==
In 2015, Pierrot signed for Seraing in the Belgian Second Division from the reserve team of French Ligue 1 side Metz.

During his time with Seraing, Pierrot was part of a team rising from the third division to the top division of Belgian football, while becoming team captain.

On 31 January 2022, Pierrot moved to Lommel.

On 8 August 2023, Pierrot was loaned by Patro Eisden.
