= Francs Borains =

Belgian football club

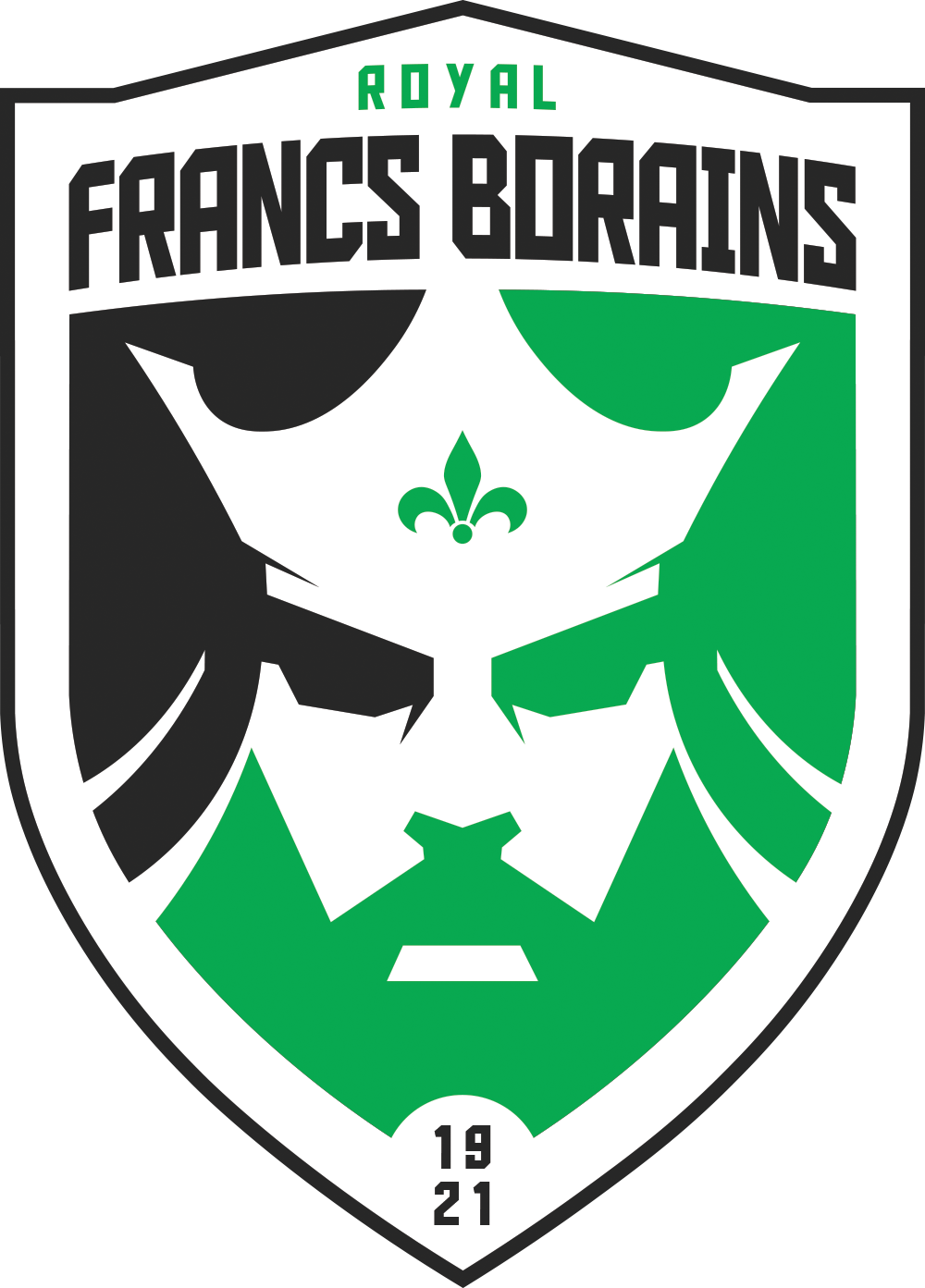
- Full name: Royal Francs Borains
- Nicknames: Le RFB; Les Verts (The Greens)
- Founded: 1949; 77 years ago
- Ground: Stade Robert Urbain, Boussu, Hainaut Province
- Capacity: 6,000
- Chairman: Georges-Louis Bouchez
- Manager: Yves Vanderhaeghe
- League: Challenger Pro League
- 2025–26: Challenger Pro League, 12th of 17
- Website: www.francsborains.be
Home colours	Away colours	Third colours

Royal Francs Borains is a football club based in Boussu, Hainaut Province, Belgium. It was founded in 1949 and its home ground is Stade Robert Urbain, which has a capacity of 6,000. The club is affiliated to the Royal Belgian Football Association (URBSFA) with matricule 5192 and has green and white as club colours. They compete in the Challenger Pro League, the second tier in Belgian football.

The club is a continuation of Boussu Dour Borinage, which had matricule 167. Francs Borains, however, compete under matricule 5192 since 2014, which was inherited from the former club Charleroi Fleurus.

== History ==
=== Early years ===
In 1922, the association football club SC de Boussu-Bois was founded in Boussu; it was assigned matricule 167 when these were introduced to Belgian football in 1926. Boussu-Bois occasionally played in the national divisions. A few decades later, in 1949, the club was founded.

In the 1980s, after a merger, the name was changed to R. Francs Borains.

=== Recent years ===
In 2008, the name was changed to Boussu Dour Borinage. However, the club experienced financial difficulties in the following years and struggled to obtain a license.

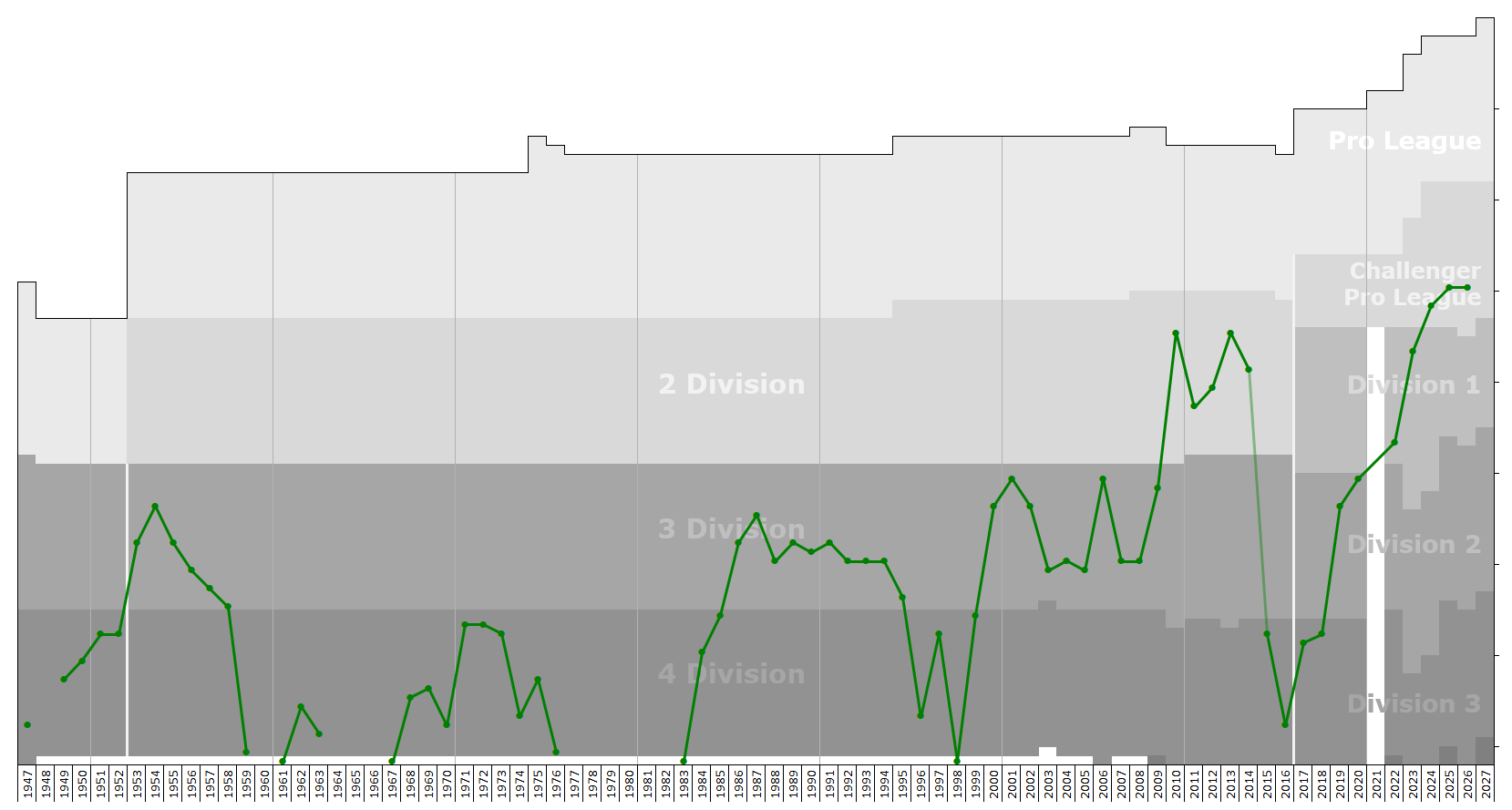
Historical league performance chart of Francs Borains and its predecessors

In 2014, Boussu Dour was approached by RFC Sérésien, a club competing in the Liège First Provincial League with matricule 23, which had been acquired by French Ligue 2 club Metz. Sérésien had ambitions to climb up the divisions, and were looking to take over a matricule from a club in the higher divisions in order to obtain a licence a few level higher. Boussu Dour were willing to transfer their matricule 167, provided that they themselves found a higher division matricule in order to maintain their youth setup. They eventually found one through Roberto Leone, who was the owner of matricule 5192 of Charleroi Fleurus in the Belgian Third Division and of matricule 94 of FC Charleroi in the Belgian First Amateur Division. Both matricules were involved in multiple mergers in those years, before becoming RAAL La Louvière in 2017.

Leone wanted to withdraw from football and sold his matricules. He came to an agreement with Boussu Dour Borinage, who would take over matricule 5192 and thus also retained its national youth setup. Matricule 94 would house a new club in the region around Charleroi which became aforementioned RAAL La Louvière, and administratively merge with the superfluous matricule 23 of RFC Sérésien to obtain their national youth setup. Boussu Dour left their former matricule 167 to Seraing.

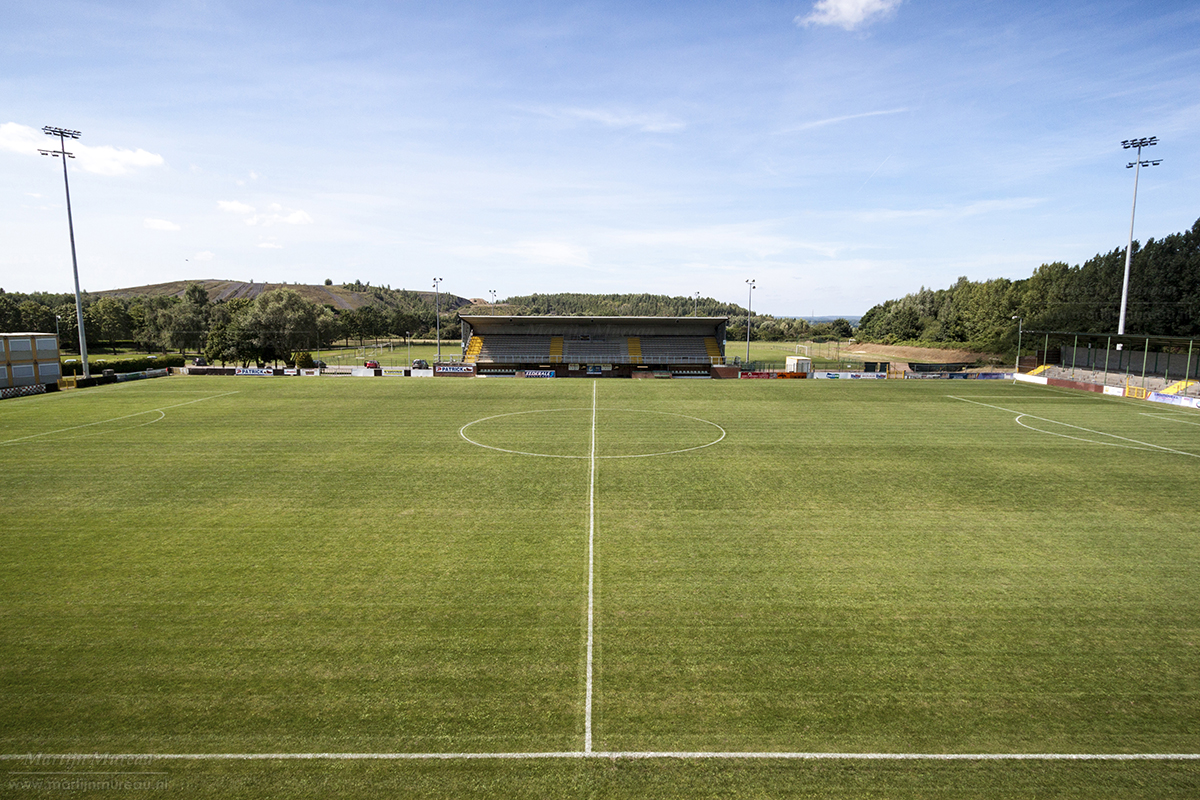
Stade Robert Urbain, home ground of Francs Borains

Boussu Dour under the new matricule 5192 took the old name Francs Borains. Since matricule 5192 as Charleroi Fleurus had just been relegated, Francs Borains started in the Belgian Fourth Division in 2014. The club immediately finished second in Fourth Division and thus qualified for promotion play-offs, but lost in the first round after penalties against City Pirates. In their second season, the club finished twelfth and moved to the Belgian Third Amateur Division due to the reforms of Belgian football. In the first season, they finished third, one point of champions RWDM, but lost in the final round to Mormont. The following season, however, the club did achieve success in the final round by beating Tournai and Jeunesse Aischoise.

In early 2020, it was announced that Francs Borains had entered into talks with Royal Albert Quévy-Mons, the continuation of RAEC Mons. However, a merger with the aim of forming a major football club from the Mons region and Borinage was met with protests from both supporters of Francs Borains and those of Mons. Plans of a merger were at an advanced stage, but on 11 April 2020, Francs Borains withdrew from negotiations.

Incidentally, 2020 was a special year for Francs Borains from a sporting point of view. Due to the COVID-19 pandemic, the KBVB decided on 27 March 2020 to stop all competitions and to determine the final ranking. The club from the Borinage played 24 games in the Belgian Second Amateur Division and finished top of the league with 52 points, which meant promotion to Belgian First Amateur Division.

On 24 April 2020, Reformist Movement president Georges-Louis Bouchez was appointed chairman of Francs Borains.

On 14 May 2023, Francs Borains secure promotion to Challenger Pro League from 2023–24 after defeat Mandel United 3–1 on Matchweek 37 and finished 3rd place of Belgian National Division 1 in 2022–23 season.

== Current squad ==
As of 25 September 2026

Note: Flags indicate national team as defined under FIFA eligibility rules; some limited exceptions apply. Players may hold more than one non-FIFA nationality.

No.	Pos.	Nation	Player
1	GK	IRL	Noah Jauny
6	MF	BEL	Rabby Mateta Pepa
7	MF	AUT	Philipp Wydra
8	MF	BEL	Kéres Masangu
9	MF	SRB	Jovan Mituljikić
10	FW	COM	Aboubacar Ali
11	FW	COD	Dieumerci Ndongala
12	FW	GHA	Raymond Asante (on loan from Charleroi)
14	FW	SWE	Lucas Lima
16	MF	BEL	Enguerran Faucon
17	DF	COM	Yannis Kari
19	FW	FRA	Enzo Faty (on loan from Toulouse)
20	GK	BEL	Victor Swinnen
22	FW	CIV	Severin Nioule (on loan from Charleroi)

No.	Pos.	Nation	Player
23	DF	BEL	Levi Malungu
24	DF	BEL	Dorian Dessoleil
25	FW	FRA	Corentyn Lavie
27	DF	FRA	Nicolas Wasbauer
28	DF	BEL	Mathias Francotte
29	DF	FRA	Maxime Bastian
33	MF	FRA	Noah Diliberto
47	FW	BEL	Hossni Soye Ndime
51	DF	BEL	Xavier Preijs
72	GK	FRA	Paul Tilloy
77	DF	BEL	Jason Dalle Molle
78	DF	BEL	Roméo Monticelli
—	GK	BEL	Rafael Celsi
—	MF	GER	Nils Ortel
