= Noël Soumah =

Senegalese footballer

Personal information
- Date of birth: 21 December 1994 (age 31)
- Place of birth: Dakar, Senegal
- Height: 1.85 m (6 ft 1 in)
- Position: Centre-back

Youth career
- –2010: Yeggo

Senior career*
Years	Team	Apps	(Gls)
2010–2013	Africa Foot		
2013	RWDM Brussels	6	(0)
2013–2016	WS Brussels	54	(7)
2016–2018	Gent		
2018	→ Westerlo (loan)	10	(1)
2018–2022	Westerlo	82	(4)
- * Club domestic league appearances and goals as of 23:56, 25 April 2022 (UTC)

Noël Soumah (born 21 December 1994) is a Senegalese professional footballer who plays as a centre-back.

== Honours ==
WS Brussels

- Belgian Second Division: 2015–16

Westerlo

- Belgian First Division B: 2021–22
