= 2022–23 Royale Union Saint-Gilloise season =

Royale Union Saint-Gilloise
2022–23 season
- Owner: Tony Bloom
- Chairman: Alex Muzio
- Manager: Karel Geraerts
- Stadium: Stade Joseph Marien
- Belgian Pro League: 3rd
- Belgian Cup: Semi-finals
- UEFA Champions League: Third qualifying round
- UEFA Europa League: Quarter-finals
- Top goalscorer: League: Simon Adingra (11 goals); All: Victor Boniface (17 goals)
Home colours	Away colours

The 2022–23 season was the 125th in the history of Royale Union Saint-Gilloise and their second consecutive season in the top flight. The club participated in the Belgian Pro League, Belgian Cup, UEFA Champions League and UEFA Europa League.

== Players ==
As of 15 February 2023

Note: Flags indicate national team as defined under FIFA eligibility rules; some limited exceptions apply. Players may hold more than one non-FIFA nationality.

No.	Pos.	Nation	Player
2	DF	NED	Bart Nieuwkoop
3	DF	BEL	Viktor Boone
6	MF	MAR	Oussama El Azzouzi
7	FW	NGR	Victor Boniface
8	MF	CIV	Jean Thierry Lazare
9	FW	GER	Dennis Eckert
10	MF	MLT	Teddy Teuma
11	FW	CIV	Simon Adingra (on loan from Brighton)
14	GK	SWE	Joachim Imbrechts
16	DF	ENG	Christian Burgess
17	MF	FIN	Casper Terho
18	FW	BEL	Yorbe Vertessen (on loan from PSV)

No.	Pos.	Nation	Player
19	DF	BEL	Guillaume François
20	MF	BEL	Senne Lynen
21	GK	BEL	Lucas Pirard
23	MF	ESP	Cameron Puertas
26	DF	ENG	Ross Sykes
28	DF	JPN	Koki Machida (on loan from Kashima Antlers)
29	FW	SWE	Gustaf Nilsson
44	DF	BEL	Siebe Van der Heyden
49	GK	LUX	Anthony Moris
59	DF	MAR	Ismaël Kandouss
85	DF	BEL	Arnaud Dony
94	FW	MAD	Loïc Lapoussin

=== Out on loan ===
Note: Flags indicate national team as defined under FIFA eligibility rules; some limited exceptions apply. Players may hold more than one non-FIFA nationality.

No.	Pos.	Nation	Player
—	DF	ENG	Matthew Sorinola (at Swansea City until 30 June 2023)
—	MF	BEL	Ilyes Ziani (at SL 16 FC until 30 June 2023)

No.	Pos.	Nation	Player
—	MF	BEL	Ryan Safari (at Lierse until 30 June 2023)

== Transfers ==
=== In ===
Pos	Player	Transferred from	Fee	Date	Source
DF	Arnaud Dony	Sint-Truiden	Free	9 June 2022	
DF	Viktor Boone	Deinze	Free	13 June 2022	
FW	(Germany) Dennis Eckert	(Germany) Ingolstadt	Undisclosed	20 June 2022	
DF	(England) Ross Sykes	(England) Accrington Stanley	Undisclosed	25 June 2022	
MF	(Ivory Coast) Simon Adingra	(England) Brighton & Hove Albion	Loan	4 July 2022	
GK	(Sweden) Joachim Imbrechts	Unattached	Free	15 July 2022	
FW	(Sweden) Gustaf Nilsson	(Germany) Wehen Wiesbaden	Undisclosed	28 July 2022	
MF	(Morocco) Oussama El Azzouzi	(Netherlands) Emmen	Undisclosed	30 July 2022	
FW	(Nigeria) Victor Boniface	(Norway) Bodø/Glimt	Undisclosed	8 August 2022	
MF	(Finland) Casper Terho	(Finland) HJK	Undisclosed	1 January 2023	
FW	Yorbe Vertessen	(Netherlands) PSV	Loan	28 January 2023	

=== Out ===
Pos	Player	Transferred to	Fee	Date	Source
DF	(England) Matthew Sorinola	(England) Swansea City	Loan	24 June 2022	
DF	(Denmark) Jonas Bager	Charleroi	Free	13 July 2022	
MF	(France) Damien Marcq	Charleroi	Free	14 July 2022	
MF	(Denmark) Casper Nielsen	Club Brugge	Undisclosed	17 July 2022	
MF	(Italy) Lorenzo Paolucci	(Italy) Ancona	Undisclosed	19 August 2022	
DF	Anas Hamzaoui	RAAL La Louvière	Undisclosed	19 August 2022	
MF	Ilyes Ziani	SL16	Loan	26 August 2022	
MF	(England) Marcel Lewis	(England) Burnley	Undisclosed	1 September 2022	
FW	Ryan Safari	Lierse	Loan	21 January 2023	
FW	Dante Vanzeir	(United States) New York Red Bulls	Undisclosed	3 February 2023	

== Pre-season and friendlies ==
Win Draw Loss Fixtures

28 June 2022 Friendly	Rebecq (Belgium)	1–3	(Belgium) Union Saint-Gilloise	Rebecq
19:30 CEST (UTC+2)				Stadium: Complexe Gobard

2 July 2022 Friendly	Deinze (Belgium)	0–1	(Belgium) Union Saint-Gilloise	Deinze
14:00 CEST (UTC+2)			Nieuwkoop 73'	Stadium: Dakota Arena

6 July 2022 Friendly	Union Saint-Gilloise (Belgium)	2–2	(Luxembourg) Racing	Marche-en-Famenne
18:30 CEST (UTC+2)				Stadium: Terrain de Marloie

9 July 2022 Friendly	Brighton & Hove Albion (England)	0–0	(Belgium) Union Saint-Gilloise	Lancing, England
18:00 BST (UTC+1)		Report		Stadium: American Express Elite Football Performance Centre; Referee: Keith Stroud

13 July 2022 Friendly	Sporting CP (Portugal)	1–1	(Belgium) Union Saint-Gilloise	Parchal, Portugal
19:00 WEST (UTC+1)	Porro 19' (pen.)		Sykes (yellow card) 20', (goal) 50'	Stadium: Complexo Desportivo Belavista

16 July 2022 Friendly	Feyenoord (Netherlands)	0–4	(Belgium) Union Saint-Gilloise	Rotterdam, Netherlands
14:00 CEST (UTC+2)			Nieuwkoop 44'; Eckert 58'; Sykes 98'; Ziani 120'	Stadium: Sportcomplex Varkenoord

== Competitions ==
=== Overall record ===
Competition	First match	Last match	Starting round	Final position	Record							
Competition	First match	Last match	Starting round	Final position	Pld	W	D	L	GF	GA	GD	Win %
Pro League	23 July 2022	23 April 2023	Matchday 1	2nd	34	23	6	5	70	41	+29	67.65
Pro League Play-off I	3 May 2023	4 June 2023	2nd	3rd	6	2	2	2	8	8	+0	33.33
Belgian Cup	9 November 2022	2 March 2023	Sixth round	Semi-finals	5	4	0	1	14	3	+11	80.00
UEFA Champions League	2 August 2022	9 August 2022	Third qualifying round	Third qualifying round	2	1	0	1	2	3	−1	50.00
UEFA Europa League	8 September 2022	20 April 2023	Group stage	Quarter-finals	10	5	3	2	19	15	+4	50.00
Total					57	35	11	11	113	70	+43	61.40

Last updated: 4 June 2023
Source: Soccerway

=== Pro League ===
==== League table ====
Pos	Team	Pld	W	D	L	GF	GA	GD	Pts	Qualification or relegation
1	Genk (J)	34	23	6	5	78	37	+41	75	Qualification for the Europa Conference League and Play-offs I (Note: The regular season winners will qualify for the 2023–24 UEFA Europa Conference League if they do not qualify for the 2023–24 UEFA Champions League in the playoffs.)
2	Union SG	34	23	6	5	70	41	+29	75	Qualification for the Play-offs I
3	Antwerp (C)	34	22	6	6	59	26	+33	72	Qualification for the Play-offs I
4	Club Brugge	34	16	11	7	61	36	+25	59	Qualification for the Play-offs I
5	Gent (U)	34	16	8	10	64	38	+26	56	Qualification for the Play-offs II

Source: Jupiler Pro League (in Dutch), Soccerway
Rules for classification: 1) Points; 2) Matches won; 3) Goal difference; 4) Goals scored; 5) Away matches won; 6) Away goal difference; 7) Away goals scored; 8) Play-off.
(C) Play-off I winner; (J) Regular season winner; (U) Play-off II winner

==== Results summary ====
Overall								Home						Away					
Pld	W	D	L	GF	GA	GD	Pts	W	D	L	GF	GA	GD	W	D	L	GF	GA	GD
34	23	6	5	70	41	+29	75	13	2	2	33	16	+17	10	4	3	37	25	+12

Last updated: 23 April 2023.
Source: Jupiler Pro League

==== Results by round ====
Round	1	2	3	4	5	6	7	8	9	10	11	12	13	14	15	16	17	18	19	20	21	22	23	24	25	26	27	28	29	30	31	32	33	34
Ground	A	H	A	H	H	A	A	H	A	A	H	A	H	H	A	H	A	H	A	H	A	H	A	H	A	H	A	H	A	H	H	A	H	A
Result	D	W	L	W	W	L	W	L	W	W	W	W	W	D	W	D	W	W	W	W	D	W	W	W	D	L	L	W	W	W	W	D	W	W
Position	10	3	11	6	9	6	5	7	6	4	4	4	4	4	4	3	2	2	2	2	2	2	2	2	2	2	2	2	2	2	2	2	2	2

Updated to match(es) played on 3 June 2023. Source: Jupiler Pro League
A = Away; H = Home; W = Win; D = Draw; L = Loss

==== Matches ====
The league fixtures were announced on 22 June 2022.

23 July 2022 1	Sint-Truiden	1–1	Union SG	Sint-Truiden
20:45 CEST (UTC+2)	Hayashi 21'	Report	Adingra 71'	Stadium: Stayen; Attendance: 5,500; Referee: Jonathan Lardot

29 July 2022 2	Union SG	1–0	Charleroi	Forest
20:45 CEST (UTC+2)	Sykes 56'	Report		Stadium: Joseph Marien Stadium; Attendance: 8,000; Referee: Nicolas Laforge

6 August 2022 3	Mechelen	3–0	Union SG	Mechelen
20:45 CEST (UTC+2)	Schoofs 44'; Lazare 51' (o.g.); Ngoy 59'	Report		Stadium: Achter de Kazerne; Attendance: 11,521; Referee: Jasper Vergoote

13 August 2022 4	Union SG	2–1	Kortrijk	Forest
20:45 CEST (UTC+2)	Teuma 9' 58'	Report	Selemani 63'	Stadium: Joseph Marien Stadium; Attendance: 5,589; Referee: Alexandre Boucaut

28 August 2022 5	Union SG	2–1	Anderlecht	Forest
18:30 CEST (UTC+2)	Boniface 2'; Vanzeir 31'	Report	Murillo 12'	Stadium: Joseph Marien Stadium; Attendance: 7,646; Referee: Nathan Verboomen

31 August 2022 6	Antwerp	4–2	Union SG	Antwerp
20:30 CEST (UTC+2)	Nieuwkoop 8' (o.g.); Janssen 15' 48'; Vines 42'	Report	Van der Heyden 22'; Eckert 71'	Stadium: Bosuilstadion; Attendance: 12,000; Referee: Jonathan Lardot

4 September 2022 7	Zulte Waregem	1–3	Union SG	Waregem
21:00 CEST (UTC+2)	Braem 90+1'	Report	Teuma 38'; Tambedou 70' (o.g.); Eckert 86'	Stadium: Regenboogstadion; Attendance: 5,592; Referee: Arthur Denil

11 September 2022 8	Union SG	1–2	Genk	Forest
18:30 CEST (UTC+2)	Lapoussin 74'	Report	Paintsil 15'; Samatta 90+2'	Stadium: Joseph Marien Stadium; Attendance: 7,117; Referee: Nathan Verboomen

18 September 2022 9	Eupen	1–2	Union SG	Eupen
16:00 CEST (UTC+2)	Lambert 18'	Report	Adingra 8'; Boniface 90+2'	Stadium: Kehrwegstadion; Attendance: 1,940; Referee: Nicolas Laforge

1 October 2022 10	OH Leuven	0–3	Union SG	Leuven
16:00 CEST (UTC+2)		Report	Burgess 12'; Kandouss 20'; Vanzeir 68'	Stadium: Den Dreef; Attendance: 6,855; Referee: Erik Lambrechts

9 October 2022 11	Union SG	2–1	Cercle Brugge	Forest
21:00 CEST (UTC+2)	Vanzeir 3'; Adingra 56'	Report	Gboho 74'	Stadium: Joseph Marien Stadium; Attendance: 6,251; Referee: Jasper Vergoote

16 October 2022 12	Oostende	1–6	Union SG	Oostende
15:00 CET (UTC+1)	Ambrose 89'	Report	Vanzeir 12' 31'; Sykes 63'; Adingra 78'; Boniface 90+1'; Puertas 90+3'	Stadium: Diaz Arena; Attendance: 2,686; Referee: Alexandre Boucaut

19 October 2022 13	Union SG	2–0	Gent	Forest
18:30 CEST (UTC+2)	Lazare 12'; Vanzeir 82'	Report		Stadium: Joseph Marien Stadium; Attendance: 8,081; Referee: Jonathan Lardot

22 October 2022 14	Union SG	2–2	Club Brugge	Forest
20:45 CEST (UTC+2)	Burgess 32'; Nieuwkoop 80'	Report	Skov Olsen 1'; Vanaken 16' (pen.)	Stadium: Joseph Marien Stadium; Attendance: 7,184; Referee: Kevin Van Damme

30 October 2022 15	Seraing	1–2	Union SG	Seraing
16:00	Elisor 75'	Report	Vanzeir 47'; Teuma 72' (pen.)	Stadium: Stade du Pairay; Referee: Bert Put

6 November 2022 16	Union SG	1–1	Westerlo	Forest
16:00 CET (UTC+1)	Nilsson 90+2'	Report	Foster 45'	Stadium: Joseph Marien Stadium; Referee: Bram Van Driessche

13 November 2022 17	Standard Liège	2–3	Union SG	Liège
16:00 CET (UTC+1)	Dussenne 53' (pen.); Zinckernagel 90+6' (pen.)	Report	Vanzeir 23'; Nieuwkoop 87'; Burgess 65'	Stadium: Stade Maurice Dufrasne; Attendance: 24,522; Referee: Lawrence Visser

26 December 2022 18	Union SG	3–0	Oostende	Forest
16:00	Boniface 11'; Adingra 84'	Report	Teuma 51' (pen.); Adingra 63'; Vanzeir 90+5'	Stadium: Joseph Marien Stadium; Referee: Arthur Denil

8 January 2023 19	Anderlecht	1–3	Union SG	Anderlecht
18:30 CEST	Silva 64'	Report	Puertas 81'; Arnstad 87' (o.g.); Adingra 90'	Stadium: Lotto Park; Referee: Bram Van Driessche

15 January 2023 20	Union SG	2–0	Antwerp	Forest
18:30 CEST	Vanzeir 34'; Teuma 76' (pen.)	Report		Stadium: Joseph Marien Stadium; Referee: Nicolas Laforge

18 January 2023 21	Cercle Brugge	1–1	Union SG	Bruges
18:30 CEST	Somers 68'	Report	Nilsson 82'	Stadium: Jan Breydel Stadium; Referee: Jasper Vergoote

21 January 2023 22	Union SG	1–0	OH Leuven	Forest
20:45 CEST	Nilsson 77'	Report		Stadium: Joseph Marien Stadium; Referee: Lothar D'hondt

28 January 2023 23	Charleroi	0–1	Union SG	Charleroi
20:45 CEST		Report	Nilsson 24'	Stadium: Stade du Pays de Charleroi; Referee: Lawrence Visser

5 February 2023 24	Union SG	4–0	Zulte Waregem	Forest
19:15	Puertas 9'; Boniface 55'; Nilsson 79'; Teuma 89'	Report		Stadium: Joseph Marien Stadium; Referee: Wim Smet

10 February 2023 25	Club Brugge	1–1	Union SG	Bruges
20:45	Vanaken 43'	Report	Lapoussin 24'	Stadium: Jan Breydel Stadium; Referee: Jan Boterberg

18 February 2023 26	Union SG	2–4	Standard Liège	Forest
20:45	Vertessen 22'; Boniface 66'	Report	Zinckernagel 20'; Alzate 25'; Balikwisha 85'; Dønnum 90+8'	Stadium: Joseph Marien Stadium; Referee: Jasper Vergoote

25 February 2023 27	Westerlo	4–2	Union SG	Westerlo
20:45	Van den Keybus 16'; Chadli 20'; De Cuyper 73' (pen.); Nene 89'	Report	Boniface 40', 67'	Stadium: Het Kuipje; Referee: Alexandre Boucaut

5 March 2023 28	Union SG	2–1	Eupen	Forest
19:15 CEST	Adingra 14'; Vertessen 52'	Report	Prevljak 90+5'	Stadium: Joseph Marien Stadium; Referee: Arthur Denil

12 March 2023 29	Genk	1–2	Union SG	Genk
18:30 CEST	Heynen 24' (pen.)	Report	Nieuwkoop 42'; Adingra 44'	Stadium: Cegeka Arena; Referee: Nathan Verboomen

19 March 2023 30	Union SG	2–1	Mechelen	Forest
18:30	Lapoussin 10'; Teuma 56' (pen.)	Report	Ngoy 4'	Stadium: Joseph Marien Stadium; Referee: Erik Lambrechts

2 April 2023 31	Union SG	2–1	Sint-Truiden	Forest
19:15	Teuma 73'; Puertas 89'	Report	Bruno 57'	Stadium: Joseph Marien Stadium; Referee: Lawrence Visser

8 April 2023 32	Gent	1–1	Union SG	Ghent
20:45 CEST (UTC+2)	Cuypers 80' (pen.)	Report	Amani 1'	Stadium: Ghelamco Arena; Referee: Jan Boterberg

16 April 2023 33	Union SG	2–1	Seraing	Forest
19:15	Adingra 17'; Vertessen 34'	Report	Mouandilmadji 47'	Stadium: Joseph Marien Stadium; Referee: Kevin Van Damme

23 April 2023 34	Kortrijk	2–4	Union SG	Kortrijk
18:30	Silva 24'; D'haene 38'	Report	Terho 16', 72'; Watanabe 67' (o.g.); Adingra 84'	Stadium: Guldensporen Stadion; Referee: Wesli De Cremer

==== Play-offs I ====
Points obtained during the regular season were halved (and rounded up) before the start of the playoff. Genk and Union SG, therefore, started on 38 points, Antwerp on 36, and Club Brugge on 30. In case of ties between some of the teams, their relative order would be based on the following list: Antwerp (points not rounded up), Genk (regular season ranked 1), Union SG (regular season ranked 2), Club Brugge (regular season ranked 4).

Pos	Team	Pld	W	D	L	GF	GA	GD	Pts	Qualification or relegation	ANT	GNK	USG	CLU
1	Antwerp (C)	6	3	2	1	10	8	+2	47	Qualification for the Champions League play-off round	—	2–1	1–1	3–2
2	Genk (K)	6	2	2	2	10	10	0	46 (Note: Tied on Points and Points without half points added due to rounding. Regular Season finishing position: Genk 1, Union SG 2.)	Qualification for the Champions League second qualifying round	2–2	—	1–1	3–1
3	Union SG	6	2	2	2	8	8	0	46	Qualification for the Europa League play-off round	0–2	3–0	—	1–3
4	Club Brugge	6	2	0	4	10	12	−2	36	Qualification for the Europa Conference League second qualifying round	2–0	1–3	1–2	—

Source: Jupiler Pro League (in Dutch), Soccerway
Legend: Blue = home team win; Yellow = draw; Red = away team win.
Rules for classification: 1) Points; 2) Points without (possible) half points added due to rounding; 3) Regular season finishing position.
(C) Champions; (K) Regular season winner
Notes:

3 May 2023 1	Union SG	0–2	Antwerp	Forest
20:30 CEST		Report	Ekkelenkamp 20'; Keita 30'	Stadium: Joseph Marien Stadium; Referee: Bram Van Driessche

6 May 2023 2	Club Brugge	1–2	Union SG	Bruges
18:15 CEST	Vanaken 90+3'	Report	Boniface 41'; Amani 46'	Stadium: Jan Breydel Stadium; Referee: Lothar D'hondt

14 May 2023 3	Union SG	3–0	Genk	Forest
18:30 CEST	Burgess 12', 81'; Teuma 68' (pen.)	Report		Stadium: Joseph Marien Stadium; Referee: Jasper Vergoote

21 May 2023 4	Genk	1–1	Union SG	Genk
18:30 CEST	McKenzie 13'	Report	Boniface 39'	Stadium: Cegeka Arena; Referee: Jonathan Lardot

28 May 2023 5	Antwerp	1–1	Union SG	Antwerp
13:30 CEST	Janssen 14'	Report	Puertas 80'	Stadium: Bosuilstadion; Referee: Erik Lambrechts

4 June 2023 6	Union SG	1–3	Club Brugge	Forest
18:30 CEST	Adingra 46'	Report	Homma 89'; Lang 90+3'; Sandra 90+10'	Stadium: Joseph Marien Stadium; Referee: Bram Van Driessche

=== Belgian Cup ===
9 November 2022 Sixth round	Cappellen	1–7	Union Saint-Gilloise	Kapellen
20:00 CEST (UTC+2)	El Madani 28'	Report	Adingra 40', 69'; El Azzouzi 52', 56'; Nilsson 64', 74'; Puertas 82'	Stadium: Stadion Jos van Wellen; Referee: Laurent Willems

20 December 2022 Seventh round	Union SG	2–1	Oostende	Forest
20:00 CET	Boniface 11'; Adingra 84'	Report	Ndicka 17'	Stadium: Joseph Marien Stadium; Referee: Kevin Van Damme

12 January 2023 Quarter-final	Union SG	4–0	Gent	Forest
20:45 CET	Nilsson 3'; Lazare 33', 90+2'; Boniface 40'	Report		Stadium: Joseph Marien Stadium; Referee: Jonathan Lardot

1 February 2023 Semi-final 1st leg	Union SG	1–0	Antwerp	Forest
20:45 CET	Nieuwkoop 84'	Report		Stadium: Joseph Marien Stadium; Referee: Jonathan Lardot

2 March 2023 Semi-final 2nd leg	Antwerp	1–0 (a.e.t.) (1–1 agg.) (4–3 p)	Union SG	Antwerp
20:45 CET	Janssen 56'	Report		Stadium: Bosuilstadion; Referee: Lawrence Visser
	Penalties
	Janssen (penalty missed); Keita (penalty scored); Muja (penalty scored); Corbanie (penalty scored); Ávila (penalty scored)		(penalty scored) Nilsson; (penalty scored) Puertas; (penalty missed) Adingra; (penalty scored) Nieuwkoop; (penalty missed) Teuma

=== UEFA Champions League ===
==== Third qualifying round ====
The draw for the third qualifying round was held on 18 July 2022.

2 August 2022 First leg	Union SG (Belgium)	2–0	(Scotland) Rangers	Leuven, Belgium
20:45 CEST (UTC+2)	Teuma 27'; Vanzeir 76' (pen.)	Report		Stadium: Den Dreef; Attendance: 1,100; Referee: Irfan Peljto (Bosnia and Herzegovina)
Note: Union SG played their third qualifying round home match at Den Dreef in Leuven, instead of their regular stadium, the Joseph Marien Stadium, in Brussels, which did not meet UEFA requirements.

9 August 2022 Second leg	Rangers (Scotland)	3–0 (3–2 agg.)	(Belgium) Union SG	Glasgow, Scotland
19:45 BST (UTC+1)	Tavernier 45' (pen.); Čolak 58'; Tillman 79'	Report		Stadium: Ibrox Stadium; Attendance: 48,454; Referee: Anastasios Sidiropoulos (Greece)

=== UEFA Europa League ===
==== Group stage ====
The draw for the group stage was held on 26 August 2022.

Pos	Team	Pld	W	D	L	GF	GA	GD	Pts	Qualification	USG	UBE	BRA	MAL
1	(Belgium) Union Saint-Gilloise	6	4	1	1	11	7	+4	13	Advance to round of 16	—	0–1	3–3	3–2
2	(Germany) Union Berlin	6	4	0	2	4	2	+2	12	Advance to knockout round play-offs	0–1	—	1–0	1–0
3	(Portugal) Braga	6	3	1	2	9	7	+2	10	Transfer to Europa Conference League	1–2	1–0	—	2–1
4	(Sweden) Malmö FF	6	0	0	6	3	11	−8	0		0–2	0–1	0–2	—

Source: UEFA
Rules for classification: Group stage tiebreakers

8 September 2022 1	Union Berlin (Germany)	0–1	(Belgium) Union Saint-Gilloise	Berlin, Germany
18:45 CEST (UTC+2)		Report	Lynen 39'	Stadium: Stadion An der Alten Försterei; Attendance: 21,512; Referee: Serhiy Boyko (Ukraine)

15 September 2022 2	Union Saint-Gilloise (Belgium)	3–2	(Sweden) Malmö FF	Leuven, Belgium
21:00 CEST (UTC+2)	Burgess 17'; Teuma 69'; Boniface 71'	Report	Ceesay 6'; Kiese Thelin 57'	Stadium: Den Dreef; Attendance: 4,373; Referee: Bartosz Frankowski (Poland)
Note: Union Saint-Gilloise played their third qualifying round home match at Den Dreef in Leuven, instead of their regular stadium, the Joseph Marien Stadium, in Brussels, which did not meet UEFA requirements.

6 October 2022 3	Braga (Portugal)	1–2	(Belgium) Union Saint-Gilloise	Braga, Portugal
15:00 CEST (UTC+2)	Ruiz 49'	Report	Nilsson 86', 90+4'	Stadium: Estádio Municipal de Braga; Attendance: 14,044; Referee: Stéphanie Frappart (France)

13 October 2022 4	Union Saint-Gilloise (Belgium)	3–3	(Portugal) Braga	Leuven, Belgium
12:45 CEST (UTC+2)	Boniface 20', 62'; Vanzeir 49'	Report	Vitinha 15', 36', 41'	Stadium: Den Dreef; Attendance: 7,851; Referee: Aliyar Aghayev (Azerbaijan)
Note: Union Saint-Gilloise played their third qualifying round home match at Den Dreef in Leuven, instead of their regular stadium, the Joseph Marien Stadium, in Brussels, which did not meet UEFA requirements.

27 October 2022 5	Malmö FF (Sweden)	0–2	(Belgium) Union Saint-Gilloise	Malmö, Sweden
18:45 CEST (UTC+2)		Report	Teuma 10'; Lazare Amani 42'	Stadium: Eleda Stadion; Attendance: 10,912; Referee: Roi Reinshreiber (Israel)

3 November 2022 6	Union Saint-Gilloise (Belgium)	0–1	(Germany) Union Berlin	Leuven, Belgium
21:00 CET (UTC+1)		Report	Michel 6'	Stadium: Den Dreef; Attendance: 5,597; Referee: Andris Treimanis (Latvia)
Note: Union Saint-Gilloise played their third qualifying round home match at Den Dreef in Leuven, instead of their regular stadium, the Joseph Marien Stadium, in Brussels, which did not meet UEFA requirements.

==== Knockout phase ====
===== Round of 16 =====
The draw for the round of 16 was held on 24 February 2023.

9 March 2023 First leg	Union Berlin (Germany)	3–3	(Belgium) Union Saint-Gilloise	Berlin, Germany
18:45 CET (UTC+1)	Juranović 42'; Knoche 69'; Michel 89'	Report	Vertessen 58'; Boniface 28', 72'	Stadium: Stadion An der Alten Försterei; Attendance: 21,605; Referee: Orel Grinfeld (Israel)

16 March 2023 Second leg	Union Saint-Gilloise (Belgium)	3–0 (6–3 agg.)	(Germany) Union Berlin	Brussels, Belgium
21:00 CET (UTC+1)	Teuma 18'; Lazare 63'; Lapoussin 90+4'	Report		Stadium: Constant Vanden Stock Stadium; Attendance: 15,681; Referee: José María Sánchez (Spain)
Note: Union Saint-Gilloise played their home match at the Constant Vanden Stock Stadium in Brussels, instead of their regular stadium, the Joseph Marien Stadium in Brussels, which did not meet UEFA requirements.

===== Quarter-finals =====
The draw for the quarter-finals was held on 17 March 2023.

13 April 2023 First leg	Bayer Leverkusen (Germany)	1–1	(Belgium) Union Saint-Gilloise	Leverkusen, Germany
21:00 CEST (UTC+2)	Wirtz 82'	Report	Boniface 51'	Stadium: BayArena; Attendance: 30,210; Referee: Ivan Kružliak

20 April 2023 Second leg	Union Saint-Gilloise (Belgium)	1–4 (2–5 agg.)	(Germany) Bayer Leverkusen	Brussels, Belgium
21:00 CEST (UTC+2)	Terho 64'	Report	Diaby 2'; Bakker 38'; Frimpong 60'; Hložek 79'	Stadium: Constant Vanden Stock Stadium; Attendance: 17,000; Referee: Antonio Mateu Lahoz
Note: Union Saint-Gilloise played their home match at the Constant Vanden Stock Stadium in Brussels, instead of their regular stadium, the Joseph Marien Stadium in Brussels, which did not meet UEFA requirements.

== Statistics ==
=== Squad appearances and goals ===
Last updated on 4 June 2023

No.	Pos	Nat	Player	Total		Belgian Division		Belgian Cup		UEFA Champions League		UEFA Europa League	
No.	Pos	Nat	Player	Apps	Goals	Apps	Goals	Apps	Goals	Apps	Goals	Apps	Goals
Goalkeepers
14	GK	(Sweden) SWE	Joachim Imbrechts	0	0	0	0	0	0	0	0	0	0
21	GK	(Belgium) BEL	Lucas Pirard	1	0	0	0	1	0	0	0	0	0
49	GK	(Luxembourg) LUX	Anthony Moris	56	0	40	0	4	0	2	0	10	0
Defenders
2	DF	(Netherlands) NED	Bart Nieuwkoop	51	4	32+3	3	4+1	1	2	0	9	0
3	DF	(Belgium) BEL	Viktor Boone	2	0	1	0	1	0	0	0	0	0
16	DF	(England) ENG	Christian Burgess	53	6	37	5	4	0	2	0	10	1
19	DF	(Belgium) BEL	Guillaume François	24	0	5+12	0	1+1	0	0+2	0	1+2	0
26	DF	(England) ENG	Ross Sykes	24	2	12+8	2	1	0	0	0	1+2	0
28	DF	(Japan) JPN	Koki Machida	10	0	7+1	0	1	0	0	0	1	0
44	DF	(Belgium) BEL	Siebe Van der Heyden	45	1	32	1	3	0	2	0	8	0
59	DF	(Morocco) MAR	Ismaël Kandouss	47	1	31+2	1	4	0	0	0	10	0
85	DF	(Belgium) BEL	Arnaud Dony	7	0	0+6	0	1	0	0	0	0	0
Midfielders
6	MF	(Morocco) MAR	Oussama El Azzouzi	34	2	6+17	0	2+2	2	0	0	1+6	0
8	MF	(Ivory Coast) CIV	Jean Thierry Lazare	50	7	34+2	3	4+1	2	0	0	9	2
10	MF	(Malta) MLT	Teddy Teuma	52	14	36	10	4+1	0	2	1	9	3
17	MF	(Finland) FIN	Casper Terho	8	3	1+5	2	0	0	0	0	0+2	1
20	MF	(Belgium) BEL	Senne Lynen	53	1	36+1	0	4	0	2	0	10	1
23	MF	(Spain) ESP	Cameron Puertas	47	6	5+29	5	1+3	1	0+2	0	0+7	0
Forwards
7	FW	(Nigeria) NGR	Victor Boniface	51	17	32+5	9	4	2	0	0	9+1	6
9	FW	(Germany) GER	Dennis Eckert	15	2	1+7	2	2+1	0	0+1	0	1+2	0
11	FW	(Ivory Coast) CIV	Simon Adingra	51	14	26+10	11	3+1	3	2	0	3+6	0
18	FW	(Belgium) BEL	Yorbe Vertessen	20	4	6+9	3	0+2	0	0	0	0+3	1
29	FW	(Sweden) SWE	Gustaf Nilsson	44	10	8+22	5	3+2	3	0	0	1+8	2
32	FW	(Belgium) BEL	Mo Salah	2	0	0+2	0	0	0	0	0	0	0
94	FW	(Madagascar) MAD	Loïc Lapoussin	54	4	28+10	3	2+2	0	2	0	8+2	1
Players who have made an appearance this season but have left the club
4	MF	(Spain) ESP	José Rodríguez	14	0	3+6	0	1	0	0	0	3+1	0
24	MF	(Morocco) MAR	Ilyes Ziani	3	0	1+1	0	0	0	0+1	0	0	0
9	FW	(Germany) GER	Deniz Undav	11	2	1+7	2	2+1	0	0	0	0	0
13	FW	(Belgium) BEL	Dante Vanzeir	28	12	20	10	0+1	0	2	1	5	1
