= 2022–23 UEFA Europa League knockout phase =

Phase of the 52nd UEFA Europa League

The 2022–23 UEFA Europa League knockout phase began on 16 February with the knockout round play-offs and ended on 31 May 2023 with the final at the Puskás Aréna in Budapest, Hungary, to decide the champions of the 2022–23 UEFA Europa League. A total of 24 teams competed in the knockout phase.

Times are CET/CEST, (Note: CET (UTC+1) for dates up to 25 March 2023 (round of 16), and CEST (UTC+2) for dates thereafter (quarter-finals, semi-finals and final).) as listed by UEFA (local times, if different, are in parentheses).

== Qualified teams ==
The knockout phase involved 24 teams: the 16 teams which qualified as winners and runners-up of each of the eight groups in the group stage, and the eight third-placed teams from the Champions League group stage.

=== Europa League group stage winners and runners-up ===
Group	Winners (advance to round of 16 and seeded in draw)	Runners-up (advance to KO play-offs and seeded in draw)
A	(England) Arsenal	(Netherlands) PSV Eindhoven
B	(Turkey) Fenerbahçe	(France) Rennes
C	(Spain) Real Betis	(Italy) Roma
D	(Belgium) Union Saint-Gilloise	(Germany) Union Berlin
E	(Spain) Real Sociedad	(England) Manchester United
F	(Netherlands) Feyenoord	(Denmark) Midtjylland
G	(Germany) SC Freiburg	(France) Nantes
H	(Hungary) Ferencváros	(France) Monaco

=== Champions League group stage third-placed teams ===
Group	Third-placed teams (advance to KO play-offs and unseeded in draw)
A	(Netherlands) Ajax
B	(Germany) Bayer Leverkusen
C	(Spain) Barcelona
D	(Portugal) Sporting CP
E	(Austria) Red Bull Salzburg
F	(Ukraine) Shakhtar Donetsk
G	(Spain) Sevilla
H	(Italy) Juventus

== Format ==
Each tie in the knockout phase, apart from the final, was played over two legs, with each team playing one leg at home. The team that scored more goals on aggregate over the two legs advanced to the next round. If the aggregate score was level, then 30 minutes of extra time were played (the away goals rule was not applied). If the score was still level at the end of extra time, the winners were decided by a penalty shoot-out. In the final, which was played as a single match, if the score was level at the end of normal time, extra time was played, followed by a penalty shoot-out if the score was still level. The mechanism of the draws for each round was as follows:

- In the draw for the knockout round play-offs, the eight group runners-up were seeded, and the eight Champions League group third-placed teams were unseeded. The seeded teams were drawn against the unseeded teams, with the seeded teams hosting the second leg. Teams from the same association could not be drawn against each other.
- In the draw for the round of 16, the eight group winners were seeded, and the eight winners of the knockout round play-offs were unseeded. Again, the seeded teams were drawn against the unseeded teams, with the seeded teams hosting the second leg. Teams from the same association could not be drawn against each other.
- In the draws for the quarter-finals onwards, there were no seedings, and teams from the same association could be drawn against each other. As the draws for the quarter-finals and semi-finals were held together before the quarter-finals were played, the identity of the quarter-final winners was not known at the time of the semi-final draw. A draw was also held to determine which semi-final winner would be designated as the "home" team for the final (for administrative purposes as it was played at a neutral venue).

In the knockout phase, teams from the same or nearby cities (Roma and Lazio, Fenerbahçe and İstanbul Başakşehir, and Anderlecht and Union Saint-Gilloise, who share the same stadium), the second team listed played in the Europa Conference League were not scheduled to play at home on the same day, due to logistics and crowd control. To avoid such scheduling conflicts, UEFA had to make adjustments. For the knockout round playoffs and a round of 16, since both teams were in the same pot and must play at home in a given leg, the home match of the team that was not the domestic cup or Europa Conference League winner, or lower domestic ranking (if neither is the domestic cup or Europa Conference League winner; i.e. Lazio and Anderlecht for this season), was moved from Thursday to Wednesday. For the quarter-finals and semi-finals, if the two teams were drawn to play at home for the same leg, the order of legs of the tie involving the team with the lowest priority was reversed from the original draw.

== Schedule ==
The schedule was as follows (all draws were held at the UEFA headquarters in Nyon, Switzerland).

Round	Draw date	First leg	Second leg
Knockout round play-offs	7 November 2022, 13:00	16 February 2023	23 February 2023
Round of 16	24 February 2023, 12:00	9 March 2023	16 March 2023
Quarter-finals	17 March 2023, 13:00	13 April 2023	20 April 2023
Semi-finals	17 March 2023, 13:00	11 May 2023	18 May 2023
Final	17 March 2023, 13:00	31 May 2023 at Puskás Aréna, Budapest	

== Bracket ==
Knockout round play-offs
(Italy) Juventus	1	3	4
(France) Nantes	1	0	1
(Portugal) Sporting CP	1	4	5
(Denmark) Midtjylland	1	0	1
(Spain) Barcelona	2	1	3
(England) Manchester United	2	2	4
(Spain) Sevilla	3	0	3
(Netherlands) PSV Eindhoven	0	2	2
(Ukraine) Shakhtar Donetsk (p)	2	1	3 (5)
(France) Rennes	1	2	3 (4)
(Austria) Red Bull Salzburg	1	0	1
(Italy) Roma	0	2	2
(Germany) Bayer Leverkusen (p)	2	3	5 (5)
(France) Monaco	3	2	5 (3)
(Netherlands) Ajax	0	1	1
(Germany) Union Berlin	0	3	3

Round of 16
(Italy) Juventus	1	2	3
(Germany) SC Freiburg	0	0	0
(Portugal) Sporting CP (p)	2	1	3 (5)
(England) Arsenal	2	1	3 (3)
(England) Manchester United	4	1	5
(Spain) Real Betis	1	0	1
(Spain) Sevilla	2	0	2
(Turkey) Fenerbahçe	0	1	1
(Ukraine) Shakhtar Donetsk	1	1	2
(Netherlands) Feyenoord	1	7	8
(Italy) Roma	2	0	2
(Spain) Real Sociedad	0	0	0
(Germany) Bayer Leverkusen	2	2	4
(Hungary) Ferencváros	0	0	0
(Germany) Union Berlin	3	0	3
(Belgium) Union Saint-Gilloise	3	3	6

Quarter-finals
(Italy) Juventus	1	1	2
(Portugal) Sporting CP	0	1	1
(England) Manchester United	2	0	2
(Spain) Sevilla	2	3	5
(Netherlands) Feyenoord	1	1	2
(Italy) Roma (a.e.t.)	0	4	4
(Germany) Bayer Leverkusen	1	4	5
(Belgium) Union Saint-Gilloise	1	1	2

Semi-finals
(Italy) Juventus	1	1	2
(Spain) Sevilla (a.e.t.)	1	2	3
(Italy) Roma	1	0	1
(Germany) Bayer Leverkusen	0	0	0

Final
31 May – Budapest
(Spain) Sevilla (p)	1 (4)
(Italy) Roma	1 (1)

== Knockout round play-offs ==
The draw for the knockout round play-offs was held on 7 November 2022, 13:00 CET.

=== Summary ===
The first legs were played on 16 February, and the second legs were played on 23 February 2023.

Team 1	Agg.	Team 2	1st leg	2nd leg
Barcelona (Spain)	3–4	(England) Manchester United	2–2	1–2
Juventus (Italy)	4–1	(France) Nantes	1–1	3–0
Sporting CP (Portugal)	5–1	(Denmark) Midtjylland	1–1	4–0
Shakhtar Donetsk (Ukraine)	3–3 (5–4 p)	(France) Rennes	2–1	1–2 (a.e.t.)
Ajax (Netherlands)	1–3	(Germany) Union Berlin	0–0	1–3
Bayer Leverkusen (Germany)	5–5 (5–3 p)	(France) Monaco	2–3	3–2 (a.e.t.)
Sevilla (Spain)	3–2	(Netherlands) PSV Eindhoven	3–0	0–2
Red Bull Salzburg (Austria)	1–2	(Italy) Roma	1–0	0–2

=== Matches ===
16 February 2023
18:45

Barcelona (Spain)	2–2	(England) Manchester United
Alonso 50'; Raphinha 76'	Report	Rashford 52'; Koundé 59' (o.g.)

Camp Nou, Barcelona
Attendance: 90,225
Referee: Maurizio Mariani (Italy)
23 February 2023
21:00 (20:00 UTC+0)

Manchester United (England)	2–1	(Spain) Barcelona
Fred 47'; Antony 73'	Report	Lewandowski 18' (pen.)

Old Trafford, Manchester
Attendance: 73,021
Referee: Clément Turpin (France)

Manchester United won 4–3 on aggregate.

16 February 2023
21:00

Juventus (Italy)	1–1	(France) Nantes
Vlahović 13'	Report	Blas 60'

Juventus Stadium, Turin
Attendance: 41,019
Referee: João Pinheiro (Portugal)
23 February 2023
18:45

Nantes (France)	0–3	(Italy) Juventus
	Report	Di María 5', 20' (pen.), 78'

Stade de la Beaujoire, Nantes
Attendance: 34,420
Referee: José María Sánchez Martínez (Spain)

Juventus won 4–1 on aggregate.

16 February 2023
21:00 (20:00 UTC+0)

Sporting CP (Portugal)	1–1	(Denmark) Midtjylland
Coates 90+4'	Report	Ashour 77'

Estádio José Alvalade, Lisbon
Attendance: 23,279
Referee: François Letexier (France)
23 February 2023
18:45

Midtjylland (Denmark)	0–4	(Portugal) Sporting CP
	Report	Coates 21'; Gonçalves 50', 77'; Gartenmann 85' (o.g.)

MCH Arena, Herning
Attendance: 9,576
Referee: Ivan Kružliak (Slovakia)

Sporting CP won 5–1 on aggregate.

16 February 2023
18:45

Shakhtar Donetsk (Ukraine)	2–1	(France) Rennes
Kryskiv 11'; Bondarenko 45' (pen.)	Report	Toko Ekambi 59'

Stadion Wojska Polskiego, Warsaw, Poland (Note: Due to the Russian invasion of Ukraine, Ukrainian teams were required to play their home matches at neutral venues until further notice. Therefore, Shakhtar Donetsk played at Stadion Wojska Polskiego, Warsaw, Poland, instead of their regular stadium, Donbas Arena in Donetsk.)
Attendance: 13,415
Referee: Irfan Peljto (Bosnia and Herzegovina)
23 February 2023
21:00

Rennes (France)	2–1 (a.e.t.)	(Ukraine) Shakhtar Donetsk
Toko Ekambi 52'; Salah 106'	Report	Belocian 119' (o.g.)
Penalties
D. Doué (penalty scored); Doku (penalty missed); Meling (penalty missed); Gouiri (penalty scored); Tait (penalty scored); Omari (penalty scored); Ugochukwu (penalty missed)	4–5	(penalty scored) Nazaryna; (penalty scored) Sudakov; (penalty scored) Bondarenko; (penalty missed) Bondar; (penalty missed) Sikan; (penalty scored) Konoplya; (penalty scored) Kelsy

Roazhon Park, Rennes
Attendance: 27,781
Referee: Tobias Stieler (Germany)

3–3 on aggregate; Shakhtar Donetsk won 5–4 on penalties.

16 February 2023
18:45

Ajax (Netherlands)	0–0	(Germany) Union Berlin
	Report

Johan Cruyff Arena, Amsterdam
Attendance: 54,322
Referee: Halil Umut Meler (Turkey)
23 February 2023
21:00

Union Berlin (Germany)	3–1	(Netherlands) Ajax
Knoche 20' (pen.); Juranović 44'; Doekhi 50'	Report	Kudus 47'

Stadion An der Alten Försterei, Berlin
Attendance: 21,800
Referee: Ricardo de Burgos Bengoetxea (Spain)

Union Berlin won 3–1 on aggregate.

16 February 2023
21:00

Bayer Leverkusen (Germany)	2–3	(France) Monaco
Diaby 48'; Wirtz 59'	Report	Hradecky 9' (o.g.); Diatta 74'; Disasi 90+2'

BayArena, Leverkusen
Attendance: 27,864
Referee: Orel Grinfeld (Israel)
23 February 2023
18:45

Monaco (France)	2–3 (a.e.t.)	(Germany) Bayer Leverkusen
Ben Yedder 19' (pen.); Embolo 84'	Report	Wirtz 13'; Palacios 21'; Adli 58'
Penalties
Disasi (penalty scored); Matazo (penalty missed); Embolo (penalty scored); Volland (penalty scored)	3–5	(penalty scored) Azmoun; (penalty scored) Amiri; (penalty scored) Tapsoba; (penalty scored) Schick; (penalty scored) Diaby

Stade Louis II, Monaco
Attendance: 8,504
Referee: Alejandro Hernández Hernández (Spain)

5–5 on aggregate; Bayer Leverkusen won 5–3 on penalties.

16 February 2023
21:00

Sevilla (Spain)	3–0	(Netherlands) PSV Eindhoven
En-Nesyri 45+2'; Ocampos 50'; Gudelj 55'	Report

Ramón Sánchez Pizjuán, Seville
Attendance: 29,593
Referee: Radu Petrescu (Romania)
23 February 2023
18:45

PSV Eindhoven (Netherlands)	2–0	(Spain) Sevilla
De Jong 77'; Silva 90+5'	Report

Philips Stadion, Eindhoven
Attendance: 34,000
Referee: Daniele Orsato (Italy)

Sevilla won 3–2 on aggregate.

16 February 2023
18:45

Red Bull Salzburg (Austria)	1–0	(Italy) Roma
Capaldo 88'	Report

Red Bull Arena, Salzburg
Attendance: 29,520
Referee: Dennis Higler (Netherlands)
23 February 2023
21:00

Roma (Italy)	2–0	(Austria) Red Bull Salzburg
Belotti 33'; Dybala 40'	Report

Stadio Olimpico, Rome
Attendance: 62,593
Referee: Slavko Vinčić (Slovenia)

Roma won 2–1 on aggregate.

== Round of 16 ==
The draw for the round of 16 was held on 24 February 2023, 12:00 CET.

=== Summary ===
The first legs were played on 9 March, and the second legs were played on 16 March 2023.

Team 1	Agg.	Team 2	1st leg	2nd leg
Union Berlin (Germany)	3–6	(Belgium) Union Saint-Gilloise	3–3	0–3
Sevilla (Spain)	2–1	(Turkey) Fenerbahçe	2–0	0–1
Juventus (Italy)	3–0	(Germany) SC Freiburg	1–0	2–0
Bayer Leverkusen (Germany)	4–0	(Hungary) Ferencváros	2–0	2–0
Sporting CP (Portugal)	3–3 (5–3 p)	(England) Arsenal	2–2	1–1 (a.e.t.)
Manchester United (England)	5–1	(Spain) Real Betis	4–1	1–0
Roma (Italy)	2–0	(Spain) Real Sociedad	2–0	0–0
Shakhtar Donetsk (Ukraine)	2–8	(Netherlands) Feyenoord	1–1	1–7

=== Matches ===
9 March 2023
18:45

Union Berlin (Germany)	3–3	(Belgium) Union Saint-Gilloise
Juranović 42'; Knoche 69'; Michel 89'	Report	Boniface 28', 72'; Vertessen 58'

Stadion An der Alten Försterei, Berlin
Attendance: 21,605
Referee: Orel Grinfeld (Israel)
16 March 2023
21:00

Union Saint-Gilloise (Belgium)	3–0	(Germany) Union Berlin
Teuma 18'; Lazare 63'; Lapoussin 90+4'	Report

Constant Vanden Stock Stadium, Brussels (Note: Union Saint-Gilloise played their home matches at Constant Vanden Stock Stadium, Brussels, instead of their regular stadium, Joseph Marien Stadium, Brussels, which did not meet UEFA requirements.)
Attendance: 15,681
Referee: José María Sánchez Martínez (Spain)

Union Saint-Gilloise won 6–3 on aggregate.

9 March 2023
21:00

Sevilla (Spain)	2–0	(Turkey) Fenerbahçe
Jordán 56'; Lamela 85'	Report

Ramón Sánchez Pizjuán, Seville
Attendance: 24,480
Referee: François Letexier (France)
16 March 2023
18:45 (20:45 UTC+3)

Fenerbahçe (Turkey)	1–0	(Spain) Sevilla
Valencia 41' (pen.)	Report

Şükrü Saracoğlu Stadium, Istanbul
Attendance: 44,775
Referee: Michael Oliver (England)

Sevilla won 2–1 on aggregate.

9 March 2023
21:00

Juventus (Italy)	1–0	(Germany) SC Freiburg
Di María 53'	Report

Juventus Stadium, Turin
Attendance: 37,474
Referee: Anastasios Sidiropoulos (Greece)
16 March 2023
18:45

SC Freiburg (Germany)	0–2	(Italy) Juventus
	Report	Vlahović 45' (pen.); Chiesa 90+5'

Europa-Park Stadion, Freiburg im Breisgau
Attendance: 33,420
Referee: Serdar Gözübüyük (Netherlands)

Juventus won 3–0 on aggregate.

9 March 2023
18:45

Bayer Leverkusen (Germany)	2–0	(Hungary) Ferencváros
Demirbay 10'; Tapsoba 86'	Report

BayArena, Leverkusen
Attendance: 25,001
Referee: Davide Massa (Italy)
16 March 2023
21:00

Ferencváros (Hungary)	0–2	(Germany) Bayer Leverkusen
	Report	Diaby 3'; Adli 81'

Puskás Aréna, Budapest (Note: Ferencváros played their home matches at Puskás Aréna, Budapest, instead of their regular stadium, Ferencváros Stadion, Budapest.)
Attendance: 50,675
Referee: Artur Soares Dias (Portugal)

Bayer Leverkusen won 4–0 on aggregate.

9 March 2023
18:45 (17:45 UTC+0)

Sporting CP (Portugal)	2–2	(England) Arsenal
Inácio 34'; Paulinho 55'	Report	Saliba 22'; Morita 62' (o.g.)

Estádio José Alvalade, Lisbon
Attendance: 36,006
Referee: Tobias Stieler (Germany)
16 March 2023
21:00 (20:00 UTC+0)

Arsenal (England)	1–1 (a.e.t.)	(Portugal) Sporting CP
Xhaka 19'	Report	Gonçalves 62'
Penalties
Ødegaard (penalty scored); Saka (penalty scored); Trossard (penalty scored); Martinelli (penalty missed)	3–5	(penalty scored) St. Juste; (penalty scored) Esgaio; (penalty scored) Inácio; (penalty scored) Arthur; (penalty scored) Santos

Emirates Stadium, London
Attendance: 59,929
Referee: Antonio Mateu Lahoz (Spain)

3–3 on aggregate; Sporting CP won 5–3 on penalties.

9 March 2023
21:00 (20:00 UTC+0)

Manchester United (England)	4–1	(Spain) Real Betis
Rashford 6'; Antony 52'; Fernandes 58'; Weghorst 82'	Report	Pérez 32'

Old Trafford, Manchester
Attendance: 72,998
Referee: Daniel Siebert (Germany)
16 March 2023
18:45

Real Betis (Spain)	0–1	(England) Manchester United
	Report	Rashford 56'

Benito Villamarín, Seville
Attendance: 54,643
Referee: Srđan Jovanović (Serbia)

Manchester United won 5–1 on aggregate.

9 March 2023
18:45

Roma (Italy)	2–0	(Spain) Real Sociedad
El Shaarawy 13'; Kumbulla 87'	Report

Stadio Olimpico, Rome
Attendance: 61,608
Referee: Sandro Schärer (Switzerland)
16 March 2023
21:00

Real Sociedad (Spain)	0–0	(Italy) Roma
	Report

Anoeta, San Sebastián
Attendance: 35,054
Referee: István Kovács (Romania)

Roma won 2–0 on aggregate.

9 March 2023
21:00

Shakhtar Donetsk (Ukraine)	1–1	(Netherlands) Feyenoord
Rakitskyi 79'	Report	Bullaude 88'

Stadion Wojska Polskiego, Warsaw, Poland
Attendance: 17,423
Referee: Ivan Kružliak (Slovakia)
16 March 2023
18:45

Feyenoord (Netherlands)	7–1	(Ukraine) Shakhtar Donetsk
Giménez 9'; Kökçü 24', 38' (pen.); Idrissi 49', 60'; Jahanbakhsh 64'; Danilo 67'	Report	Kelsy 87'

De Kuip, Rotterdam
Attendance: 37,500
Referee: Jesús Gil Manzano (Spain)

Feyenoord won 8–2 on aggregate.

== Quarter-finals ==
The draw for the quarter-finals was held on 17 March 2023, 13:00 CET.

=== Summary ===
The first legs were played on 13 April, and the second legs were played on 20 April 2023.

Team 1	Agg.	Team 2	1st leg	2nd leg
Manchester United (England)	2–5	(Spain) Sevilla	2–2	0–3
Juventus (Italy)	2–1	(Portugal) Sporting CP	1–0	1–1
Bayer Leverkusen (Germany)	5–2	(Belgium) Union Saint-Gilloise	1–1	4–1
Feyenoord (Netherlands)	2–4	(Italy) Roma	1–0	1–4 (a.e.t.)

=== Matches ===
13 April 2023
21:00 (20:00 UTC+1)

Manchester United (England)	2–2	(Spain) Sevilla
Sabitzer 14', 21'	Report	Malacia 84' (o.g.); Maguire 90+2' (o.g.)

Old Trafford, Manchester
Attendance: 72,825
Referee: Felix Zwayer (Germany)
20 April 2023
21:00

Sevilla (Spain)	3–0	(England) Manchester United
En-Nesyri 8', 81'; Badé 47'	Report

Ramón Sánchez Pizjuán, Seville
Attendance: 41,974
Referee: Artur Soares Dias (Portugal)

Sevilla won 5–2 on aggregate.

13 April 2023
21:00

Juventus (Italy)	1–0	(Portugal) Sporting CP
Gatti 73'	Report

Juventus Stadium, Turin
Attendance: 38,490
Referee: Halil Umut Meler (Turkey)
20 April 2023
21:00 (20:00 UTC+1)

Sporting CP (Portugal)	1–1	(Italy) Juventus
Edwards 20' (pen.)	Report	Rabiot 9'

Estádio José Alvalade, Lisbon
Attendance: 45,903
Referee: François Letexier (France)

Juventus won 2–1 on aggregate.

13 April 2023
21:00

Bayer Leverkusen (Germany)	1–1	(Belgium) Union Saint-Gilloise
Wirtz 82'	Report	Boniface 51'

BayArena, Leverkusen
Attendance: 30,210
Referee: Ivan Kružliak (Slovakia)
20 April 2023
21:00

Union Saint-Gilloise (Belgium)	1–4	(Germany) Bayer Leverkusen
Terho 64'	Report	Diaby 2'; Bakker 37'; Frimpong 60'; Hložek 79'

Constant Vanden Stock Stadium, Brussels
Attendance: 17,069
Referee: Antonio Mateu Lahoz (Spain)

Bayer Leverkusen won 5–2 on aggregate.

13 April 2023
18:45

Feyenoord (Netherlands)	1–0	(Italy) Roma
Wieffer 53'	Report

De Kuip, Rotterdam
Attendance: 42,960
Referee: José María Sánchez Martínez (Spain)
20 April 2023
21:00

Roma (Italy)	4–1 (a.e.t.)	(Netherlands) Feyenoord
Spinazzola 60'; Dybala 89'; El Shaarawy 101'; Pellegrini 109'	Report	Paixão 80'

Stadio Olimpico, Rome
Attendance: 66,742
Referee: Anthony Taylor (England)

Roma won 4–2 on aggregate.

== Semi-finals ==
The draw for the semi-finals was held on 17 March 2023, 13:00 CET, after the quarter-final draw.

=== Summary ===
The first legs were played on 11 May, and the second legs were played on 18 May 2023.

Team 1	Agg.	Team 2	1st leg	2nd leg
Juventus (Italy)	2–3	(Spain) Sevilla	1–1	1–2 (a.e.t.)
Roma (Italy)	1–0	(Germany) Bayer Leverkusen	1–0	0–0

=== Matches ===
11 May 2023
21:00

Juventus (Italy)	1–1	(Spain) Sevilla
Gatti 90+7'	Report	En-Nesyri 26'

Juventus Stadium, Turin
Attendance: 34,816
Referee: Daniel Siebert (Germany)
18 May 2023
21:00

Sevilla (Spain)	2–1 (a.e.t.)	(Italy) Juventus
Suso 71'; Lamela 95'	Report	Vlahović 65'

Ramón Sánchez Pizjuán, Seville
Attendance: 42,186
Referee: Danny Makkelie (Netherlands)

Sevilla won 3–2 on aggregate.

11 May 2023
21:00

Roma (Italy)	1–0	(Germany) Bayer Leverkusen
Bove 63'	Report

Stadio Olimpico, Rome
Attendance: 63,123
Referee: Michael Oliver (England)
18 May 2023
21:00

Bayer Leverkusen (Germany)	0–0	(Italy) Roma
	Report

BayArena, Leverkusen
Attendance: 30,210
Referee: Slavko Vinčić (Slovenia)

Roma won 1–0 on aggregate.

== Final ==
The final was played on 31 May 2023 at the Puskás Aréna in Budapest. A draw was held on 17 March 2023, after the quarter-final and semi-final draws, to determine the "home" team for administrative purposes.

31 May 2023
21:00

Sevilla (Spain)	1–1 (a.e.t.)	(Italy) Roma
Mancini 55' (o.g.)	Report	Dybala 35'
Penalties
Ocampos (penalty scored); Lamela (penalty scored); Rakitić (penalty scored); Montiel (penalty scored)	4–1	(penalty scored) Cristante; (penalty missed) Mancini; (penalty missed) Ibañez

Puskás Aréna, Budapest
Attendance: 61,476
Referee: Anthony Taylor (England)
