= Joachim Imbrechts =

Swedish footballer (born 2001)

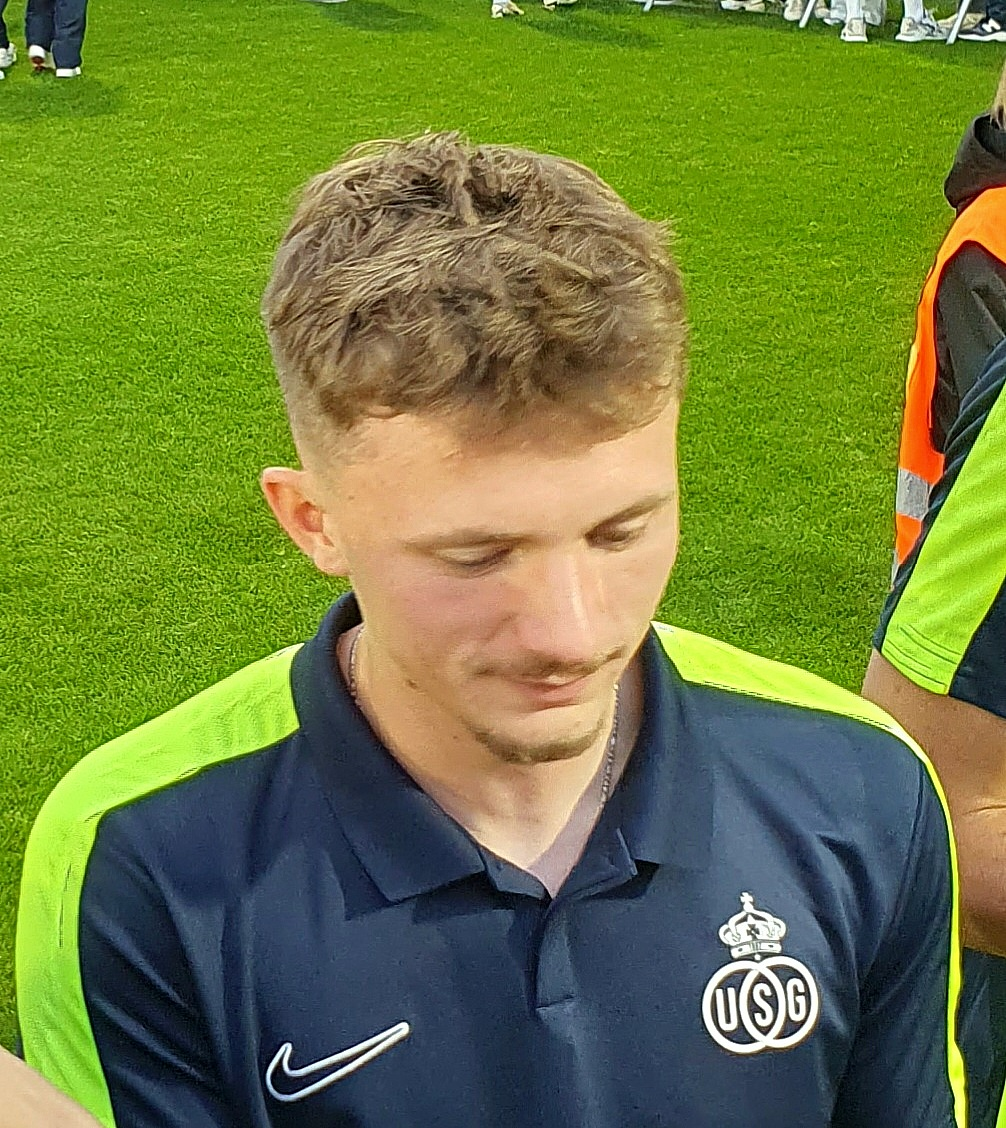

Personal information
- Full name: Joachim Lasse Imbrechts
- Date of birth: 9 October 2001 (age 25)
- Place of birth: Ixelles, Belgium
- Height: 1.84 m (6 ft 0 in)
- Position: Goalkeeper

Team information
- Current team: RSCA Futures
- Number: 73

Youth career
- Meux
- –2015: UR Namur
- 2015–2020: Charleroi
- 2021–2022: Union SG

Senior career*
Years	Team	Apps	(Gls)
2019–2021	Charleroi	0	(0)
2022–2025	Union SG	1	(0)
2022–2025	Union SG U23	15	(0)
2025–	RSCA Futures	16	(0)

International career^{‡}
2017	Belgium U16	3	(0)
2017	Belgium U17	2	(0)
2018	Sweden U17	2	(0)
2018–2021	Sweden U19	3	(0)
2021	Sweden U20	2	(0)
- * Club domestic league appearances and goals as of 20 April 2026 ‡ National team caps and goals as of 20 December 2025

Joachim Lasse Imbrechts (born 9 October 2001) is a footballer who plays as a goalkeeper for Challenger Pro League club RSCA Futures. Born in Belgium, he represented it internationally on junior levels, before switching to representing Sweden.

== Early life ==
Imbrechts grew up in Namur, Belgium.

== Club career ==
In 2021, he signed for Belgian side Union SG, where he was in the club's squads for the 2022–23 UEFA Champions League and 2022–23 UEFA Europa League. He made his professional debut on the 1 October 2023, with Union Saint-Gilloise against his former club Charleroi. On the 9 May 2024, he won the Belgian Cup.

On 30 July 2025, Imbrechts signed a one-season contract with Anderlecht. He was assigned to their reserve team RSCA Futures.

== International career ==
Imbrechts initially represented Belgium internationally, playing in Belgium national under-17 football team friendlies. He then switched to representing Sweden and debuted for the under-17 team at the 2018 Four Nations Tournament.

== Personal life ==
Imbrechts regards Sweden international Zlatan Ibrahimovic as his football idol. He was born to a Swedish mother and a Belgian father.
