= Victor Boniface =

Nigerian footballer (born 2000)

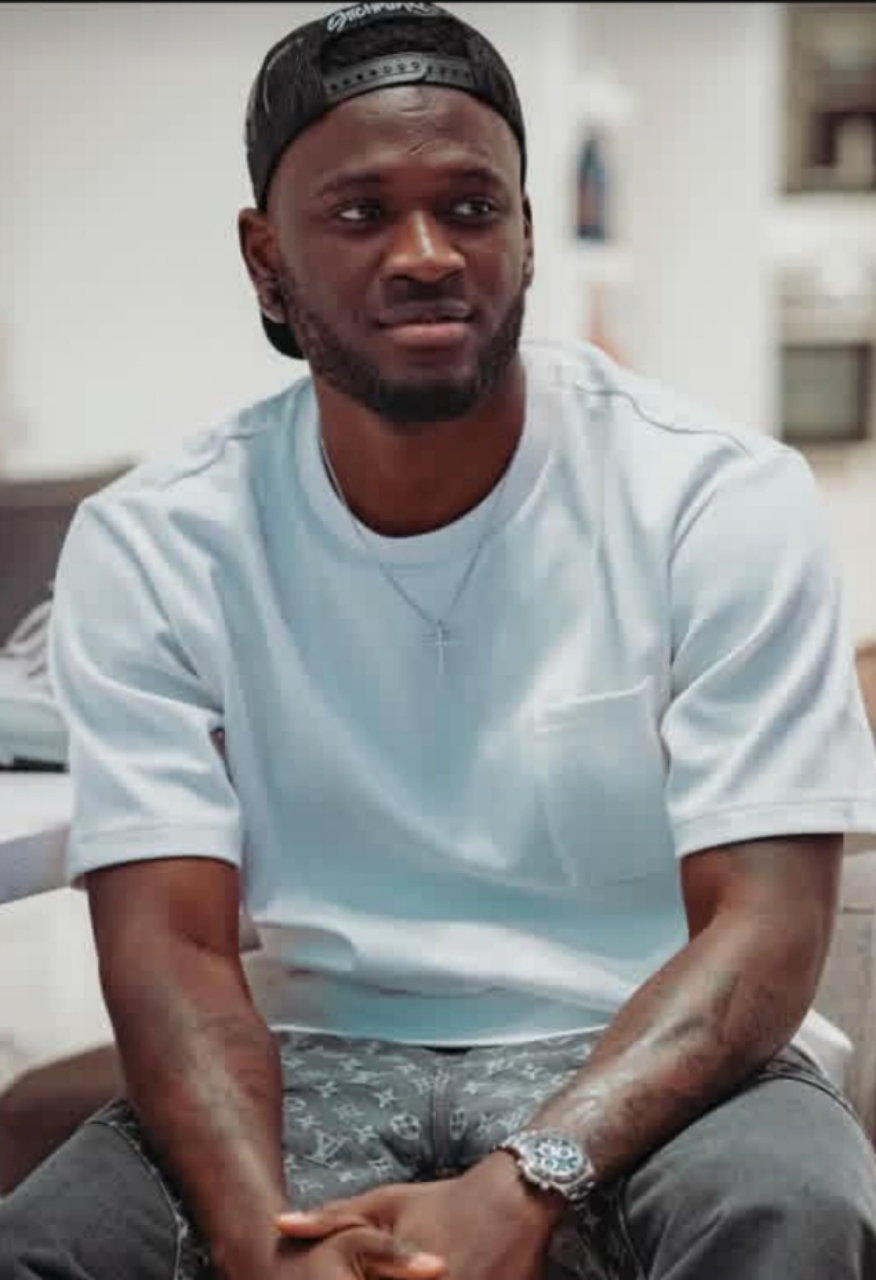
- Boniface in 2025

Personal information
- Full name: Victor Okoh Boniface
- Date of birth: 23 December 2000 (age 25)
- Place of birth: Akure, Nigeria
- Height: 1.89 m (6 ft 2 in)
- Position: Striker

Team information
- Current team: Bayer Leverkusen
- Number: 22

Youth career
- –2019: Real Sapphire

Senior career*
Years	Team	Apps	(Gls)
2019–2022	Bodø/Glimt	48	(13)
2022–2023	Union SG	37	(9)
2023–	Bayer Leverkusen	44	(22)
2025–2026	→ Werder Bremen (loan)	11	(0)

International career^{‡}
2023–	Nigeria	13	(1)
- * Club domestic league appearances and goals as of 31 October 2026 ‡ National team caps and goals as of 6 June 2025 (UTC)

Victor Okoh Boniface (born 23 December 2000) is a Nigerian professional footballer who plays as a striker for Bundesliga club Bayer Leverkusen and the Nigeria national team.

== Club career ==
=== Real Sapphire ===
In January 2018, Boniface went on loan to KTFF Süper Lig club Lefke TSK where he scored 3 goals in 3 appearances. After continuing his career here for a short time, he returned to Real Sapphire in July 2018.

=== Bodø/Glimt ===
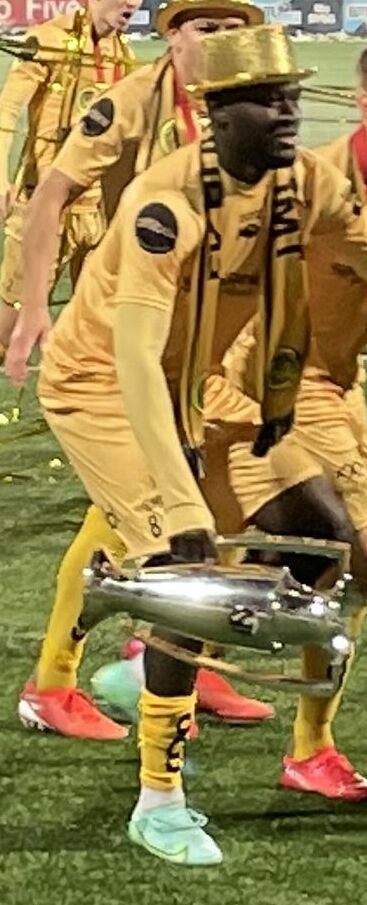
Boniface celebrating with Bodø/Glimt in 2021

Boniface signed for Norwegian side Bodø/Glimt on 4 March 2019. He suffered a ligament injury only two weeks after signing for Glimt, which was said to be likely to keep him on the sidelines for the duration of the 2019 season. Boniface was selected to the Nigeria U-20 squad to play the 2019 Africa U-20 Cup of Nations, but had to withdraw from the squad due to injury. In September 2019 he nonetheless made his league debut for the club.

=== Union SG ===
On 8 August 2022, Boniface signed a four-year contract with Belgian side Union Saint-Gilloise. Union reached the quarter-finals of the 2022–23 Europa League. Boniface scored six goals in the competition, including a brace against Union Berlin in the round of 16, finishing as the competition's joint top scorer along with Marcus Rashford.

=== Bayer Leverkusen ===
On 22 July 2023, Boniface signed for Bundesliga club Bayer Leverkusen on a contract until 2028, and was assigned the number 22 shirt. He made his Bundesliga debut as a starter on 19 August, in a 3–2 home victory over RB Leipzig. The following week, on 26 August, he scored his first Bundesliga goals by netting a brace at the Borussia Park in a 3–0 away derby win against Borussia Mönchengladbach.

In early April 2024, Boniface recovered from an adductor injury sustained in January that year. On 11 April, he netted his first goal following his return in a 2–0 win against West Ham United in the 1st leg of the Europa League quarter-final. Four days later, he scored the opener from the penalty spot and provided an assist in a 5–0 win against Werder Bremen, helping his club to secure the Bundesliga title for the first time with five games to spare. He eventually managed to finish his first season at the club as their top scorer in the league with 14 goals, winning the Bundesliga with Bayer Leverkusen.

On 1 October 2024, he scored his first UEFA Champions League goal, securing a 1–0 victory over AC Milan. In the summer of 2025, his proposed loan move to the latter club collapsed after he failed the medical examination due to recurring knee issues.

==== Loan to Werder Bremen ====
Boniface joined fellow Bundesliga club Werder Bremen on a season-long loan on 1 September, the last day of the summer transfer window.

== International career ==
Boniface made his debut for the Nigeria senior team on 10 September 2023, coming on in the 64th minute for Taiwo Awoniyi. He provided an assist in that match to Samuel Chukwueze.

On 29 December 2023, he was named in the Nigerian squad for the 2023 Africa Cup of Nations in the Ivory Coast. However, on 8 January 2024, Boniface sustained a muscle injury which forced him to miss the African tournament, and he was replaced by Terem Moffi.

== Style of play ==
Boniface is known for his distinctive style of play. His playing characteristics include strengths in dribbling, finishing, and headed attempts, while his weaknesses lie in offside awareness, holding onto the ball, and defensive contribution.

He is described as a player who likes to dribble, likes to do layoffs, and likes to play long balls. These attributes contribute to his effectiveness as a forward on the field.His background includes learning to play football in a military barracks in Nigeria.

Overall, Boniface's style of play is characterised by his technical abilities, goal-scoring prowess, and unique playing preferences.

== Personal life ==
Boniface is a Christian. Boniface enjoys making goal celebrations to entertain people when he scores. His footballing idol was Neymar.

== Career statistics ==
=== Club ===
As of match played 31 October 2026

Appearances and goals by club, season and competition
Club	Season	League			National cup (Note: Includes Norwegian Cup, Belgian Cup, DFB-Pokal)		Europe		Other		Total	
Club	Season	Division	Apps	Goals	Apps	Goals	Apps	Goals	Apps	Goals	Apps	Goals
Bodø/Glimt	2019	Eliteserien	8	1	0	0	—		—		8	1
Bodø/Glimt	2020	Eliteserien	24	6	0	0	3 (Note: Appearances in UEFA Europa League)	2	—		27	8
Bodø/Glimt	2021	Eliteserien	1	0	0	0	0	0	—		1	0
Bodø/Glimt	2022	Eliteserien	15	6	5	3	10 (Note: Four appearances and five goals in UEFA Champions League, six appearances in UEFA Europa Conference League)	5	—		30	14
Bodø/Glimt	Total		48	13	5	3	13	7	—		66	23
Union SG	2022–23	Belgian Pro League	37	9	4	2	10	6	—		51	17
Bayer Leverkusen	2023–24	Bundesliga	23	14	3	2	8	5	—		34	21
Bayer Leverkusen	2024–25	Bundesliga	19	8	3	1	4 (Note: Appearances in UEFA Champions League)	1	1 (Note: Appearance in Franz Beckenbauer Supercup)	1	27	11
Bayer Leverkusen	2026–27	Bundesliga	2	0	1	0	0	0	—		3	0
Bayer Leverkusen	Total		44	22	7	3	12	6	1	1	64	32
Werder Bremen (loan)	2025–26	Bundesliga	11	0	—		—		—		11	0
Career total			140	44	16	8	35	19	1	1	192	72

=== International ===
As of match played 6 June 2025

Appearances and goals by national team and year
National team	Year	Apps	Goals
Nigeria	2023	5	1
Nigeria	2024	6	0
Nigeria	2025	2	0
Total		13	1

Scores and results list Nigeria's goal tally first, score column indicates score after each Boniface goal.

List of international goals scored by Victor Boniface
No.	Date	Venue	Opponent	Score	Result	Competition
1	13 October 2023	Estádio Municipal de Portimão, Portimão, Portugal	Saudi Arabia	1–1	2–2	Friendly

== Honours ==
Bodø/Glimt

- Eliteserien: 2020, 2021

Bayer Leverkusen

- Bundesliga: 2023–24
- DFB-Pokal: 2023–24
- DFL-Supercup: 2024

Individual

- UEFA Europa League top scorer: 2022–23
- UEFA Europa League Team of the Season: 2022–23
- Bundesliga Team of the Season: 2023–24
- Bundesliga Rookie of the Season: 2023–24
