= Viktor Boone =

Belgian footballer (born 1998)

Personal information
- Full name: Viktor Luc Boone
- Date of birth: 25 January 1998 (age 28)
- Place of birth: Belgium
- Height: 1.91 m (6 ft 3 in)
- Position: Defender

Team information
- Current team: Beveren
- Number: 3

Youth career
- –2017: Gent
- 2017–2018: Petegem

Senior career*
Years	Team	Apps	(Gls)
2018–2022	Deinze	86	(2)
2022–2024	Union SG	1	(0)
2023–2024	→ Lierse (loan)	25	(3)
2024–2025	Lierse	25	(0)
2025–	Beveren	25	(1)
- * Club domestic league appearances and goals as of 19 April 2026

Viktor Boone (born 25 January 1998) is a Belgian footballer who plays as a defender for Beveren.

== Career ==
He is the son of former footballer Nico Boone, who played in the top flight of Belgian footballer for K.V. Kortrijk. Viktor Boone was in the youth system at K.A.A. Gent before joining Sparta Petegem in 2017. Boone then played for K.M.S.K. Deinze for four seasons, with the last two being in the Challenger Pro League. In June, 2022 he signed with Union SG on a two-year contract, with the option of a third. He made his debut for Union SG on 6 August 2022 starting a 3–0 away defeat against K.V. Mechelen.

On 5 September 2023, Boone joined Lierse on a season-long loan. On 15 May 2024, Boone agreed to move Lierse on a permanent basis and signed a two-year contract.

On 18 June 2025, Boone signed a two-season contract with Beveren.
