= 2022–23 UEFA Europa League =

European football tournament

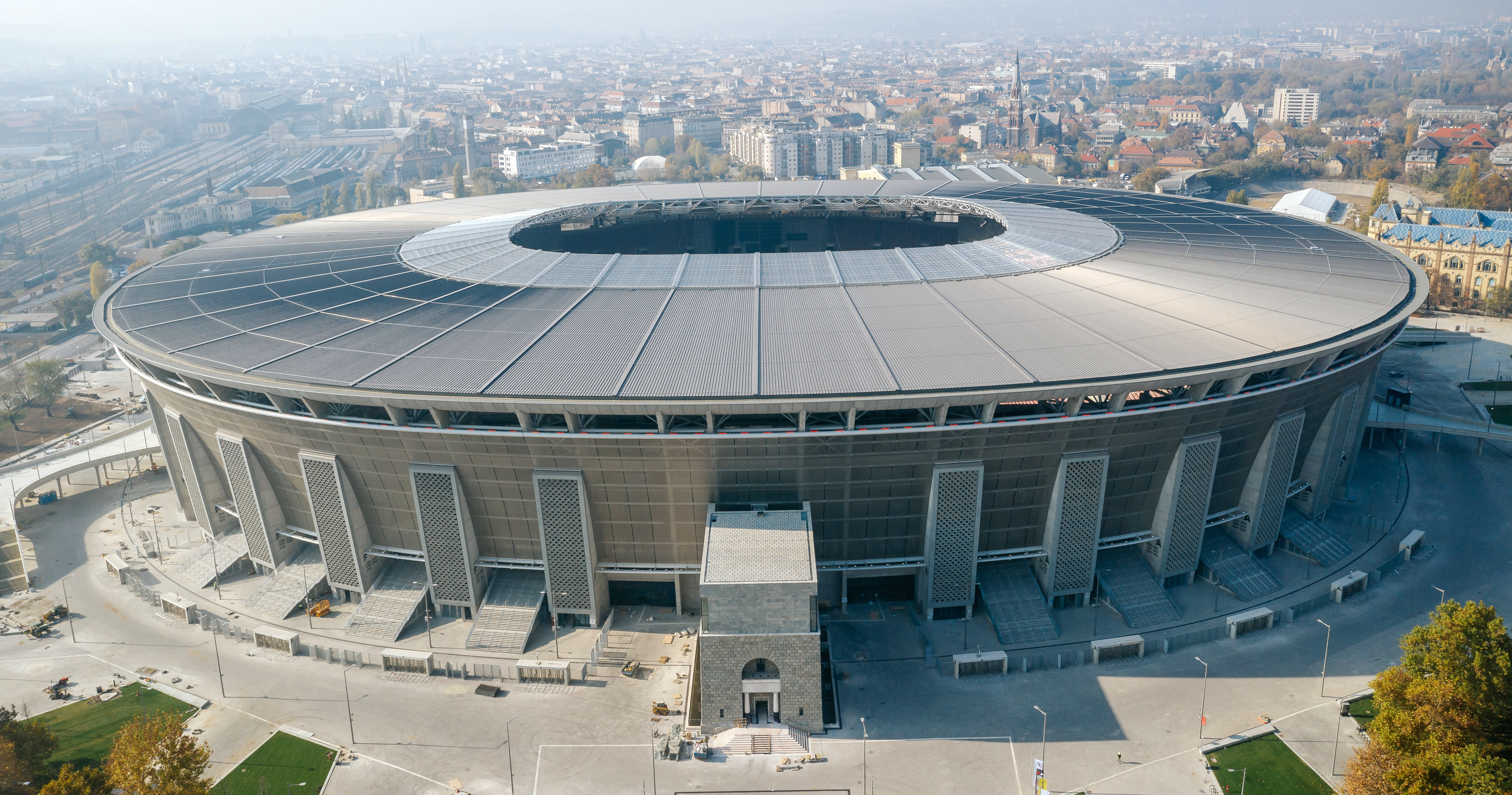
- The Puskás Aréna in Budapest hosted the final

Tournament details
- Dates: Qualifying: 4–25 August 2022; Competition proper: 8 September 2022 – 31 May 2023
- Teams: Competition proper: 32+8; Total: 21+36 (from 33 associations)

Final positions
- Champions: (Spain) Sevilla (7th title)
- Runners-up: (Italy) Roma

Tournament statistics
- Matches played: 141
- Goals scored: 381 (2.7 per match)
- Attendance: 4,067,872 (28,850 per match)
- Top scorer(s): Victor Boniface (Union Saint-Gilloise); Marcus Rashford (Manchester United); 6 goals each
- Best player: Jesús Navas (Sevilla)
- Best young player: Florian Wirtz (Bayer Leverkusen)

The 2022–23 UEFA Europa League was the 52nd season of Europe's secondary club football tournament organised by UEFA, and the 14th season since it was renamed from the UEFA Cup to the UEFA Europa League.

Sevilla defeated Roma in the final played at the Puskás Aréna in Budapest, Hungary, 4–1 on penalties following a 1–1 draw after extra time, winning the competition for a record-extending seventh time. Budapest was originally scheduled to host the final match for the 2021–22 UEFA Europa League, but several hosts were shifted because of the delay and ultimate relocation of the 2020 final due to the COVID-19 pandemic.

As winners of the tournament, Sevilla automatically qualified for the 2023–24 UEFA Champions League group stage and also earned the right to play against the winners of the 2022–23 UEFA Champions League, Manchester City, in the 2023 UEFA Super Cup.

As the title holders, Eintracht Frankfurt qualified for the 2022–23 UEFA Champions League. They were unable to defend their title after advancing to the knockout phase, and were eliminated by Napoli in the first knockout round.

== Association team allocation ==
A total of 57 teams from 33 of the 55 UEFA member associations participated in the 2022–23 UEFA Europa League. Among them, 15 associations had teams directly qualifying for the Europa League, while for the other 40 associations that did not have any teams directly qualifying, 18 of them had teams playing after being transferred from the Champions League (the only member associations which could not have a participant were Russia and Liechtenstein, which did not organise a domestic league, and could only enter their cup winner into the UEFA Europa Conference League given their association ranking). The association ranking based on the UEFA country coefficients was used to determine the number of participating teams for each association:

- The title holders of the UEFA Europa Conference League were given an entry in the Europa League (as they did not qualify for the Champions League group stage).
- Associations 1–5 each had two teams qualify.
- Associations 6–7 and 9–15 each had one team qualify.
- 36 teams eliminated from the 2022–23 UEFA Champions League were transferred to the Europa League.

=== Association ranking ===
For the 2022–23 UEFA Europa League, the associations were allocated places according to their 2021 UEFA country coefficients, which took into account their performance in European competitions from 2016–17 to 2020–21.

Apart from the allocation based on the country coefficients, associations may have had additional teams participating in the Europa League, as noted below:

- (UCL) – Additional teams transferred from the UEFA Champions League
- (UECL) – Additional berth for UEFA Europa Conference League title holders

Association ranking for 2022–23 UEFA Europa League

Rank	Association	Coeff.	Teams	Notes
1	England	100.569	2	
2	Spain	97.855	2	+2 (UCL)
3	Italy	75.438	2	+1 (UCL)
4	Germany	73.570	2	+1 (UCL)
5	France	56.081	2	+1 (UCL)
6	Portugal	48.549	1	+1 (UCL)
7	Netherlands	39.200	1	+2 (UCL)
8	Russia	38.382	0	
9	Belgium	36.500	1	+1 (UCL)
10	Austria	35.825	1	+2 (UCL)
11	Scotland	33.375	1	
12	Ukraine	33.100	1	+2 (UCL)
13	Turkey	30.100	1	+2 (UCL)
14	Denmark	27.875	1	+1 (UCL)
15	Cyprus	27.750	1	+2 (UCL)
16	Serbia	26.750	1	+1 (UCL)
17	Czech Republic	26.600	1	
18	Croatia	26.275	0	
19	Switzerland	26.225	0	+1 (UCL)

Rank	Association	Coeff.	Teams	Notes
20	Greece	26.000	0	+1 (UCL)
21	Israel	24.375	0	
22	Norway	21.000	0	+1 (UCL)
23	Sweden	20.500	0	+1 (UCL)
24	Bulgaria	20.375	0	+1 (UCL)
25	Romania	18.200	0	
26	Azerbaijan	16.875	0	+1 (UCL)
27	Kazakhstan	15.625	0	
28	Hungary	15.500	0	+1 (UCL)
29	Belarus	15.250	0	
30	Poland	15.125	0	
31	Slovenia	14.250	0	+1 (UCL)
32	Slovakia	13.625	0	+1 (UCL)
33	Liechtenstein	9.000	0	
34	Lithuania	8.750	0	+1 (UCL)
35	Luxembourg	8.250	0	+1 (UCL)
36	Bosnia and Herzegovina	8.000	0	
37	Republic of Ireland	7.875	0	+1 (UCL)

Rank	Association	Coeff.	Teams	Notes
38	North Macedonia	7.625	0	+1 (UCL)
39	Armenia	7.375	0	+1 (UCL)
40	Latvia	7.375	0	
41	Albania	7.250	0	
42	Northern Ireland	6.958	0	+1 (UCL)
43	Georgia	6.875	0	
44	Finland	6.875	0	+1 (UCL)
45	Moldova	6.875	0	+1 (UCL)
46	Malta	6.375	0	
47	Faroe Islands	6.125	0	
48	Kosovo	5.833	0	
49	Gibraltar	5.666	0	
50	Montenegro	5.000	0	
51	Wales	5.000	0	
52	Iceland	4.875	0	
53	Estonia	4.750	0	
54	Andorra	3.331	0	
55	San Marino	1.166	0	

=== Distribution ===
The following is the access list for this season.

Access list for 2022–23 UEFA Europa League
		Teams entering in this round	Teams advancing from previous round	Teams transferred from Champions League
Third qualifying round (14 teams)	Champions Path (10 teams)			10 teams eliminated from Champions League second qualifying round (Champions Path)
Third qualifying round (14 teams)	Main Path (4 teams)	2 domestic cup winners from associations 16–17		2 teams eliminated from Champions League second qualifying round (League Path)
Play-off round (20 teams)		7 domestic cup winners from associations 8–15 (except Russia)	5 winners from the third qualifying round (Champions Path); 2 winners from the third qualifying round (Main Path)	6 teams eliminated from Champions League third qualifying round (Champions Path)
Group stage (32 teams)		7 domestic cup winners from associations 1–7; 1 domestic league fourth-placed team from association 5; 4 domestic league fifth-placed teams from associations 1–4	10 winners from the play-off round	4 teams eliminated from Champions League play-off round (Champions Path); 2 teams eliminated from Champions League play-off round (League Path); 4 teams eliminated from Champions League third qualifying round (League Path)
Preliminary knockout round (16 teams)			8 group runners-up from the group stage	8 group third-placed teams from Champions League group stage
Knockout phase (16 teams)			8 group winners from the group stage; 8 winners from the preliminary knockout round	

Due to the suspension of Russia for the 2022–23 European season, the following changes to the access list were made:

- The cup winners of associations 13 (Turkey) and 14 (Denmark) enter the play-off round instead of the third qualifying round.
- The cup winners of association 16 (Serbia) enter the third qualifying round instead of the Europa Conference League second qualifying round.

Since the Europa Conference League title holders (Roma) qualified through their league position, the following changes to the access list were made:

- The cup winners of association 7 (Netherlands) enter the group stage instead of the play-off round.
- The cup winners of association 15 (Cyprus) enter the play-off round instead of the third qualifying round.
- The cup winners of association 17 (Czech Republic) enter the third qualifying round instead of the Europa Conference League second qualifying round.

==== Redistribution rules ====
A Europa League place was vacated when a team qualified for both the Champions League and the Europa League, or qualified for the Europa League by more than one method. When a place was vacated, it was redistributed within the national association by the following rules:

- When the domestic cup winners (considered as the "highest-placed" qualifier within the national association with the latest starting round) also qualified for the Champions League, their Europa League place was vacated. As a result, the highest-placed team in the league which had not yet qualified for European competitions qualified for the Europa League, with the Europa League qualifiers which finished above them in the league moved up one "place".
- When the domestic cup winners also qualified for the Europa League through league position, their place through the league position was vacated. As a result, the highest-placed team in the league which had not yet qualified for European competitions qualified for the Europa League, with the Europa League qualifiers which finished above them in the league moved up one "place" if possible.
- For associations where a Europa League place was reserved for either the League Cup or end-of-season European competition play-offs winners, they always qualified for the Europa League as the "lowest-placed" qualifier. If the League Cup winners had already qualified for European competitions through other methods, this reserved Europa League place was taken by the highest-placed team in the league which had not yet qualified for European competitions.

=== Teams ===
The labels in the parentheses show how each team qualified for the place of its starting round:

- ECL: Europa Conference League title holders
- CW: Cup winners
- 4th, 5th, etc.: League position of the previous season
- Abd-: League positions of abandoned season as determined by the national association; all teams were subject to approval by UEFA
- UCL: Transferred from the Champions League
  - GS: Third-placed teams from the group stage
  - CH/LP PO: Losers from the play-off round (Champions/League Path)
  - CH/LP Q3: Losers from the third qualifying round (Champions/League Path)
  - CH/LP Q2: Losers from the second qualifying round (Champions/League Path)

The third qualifying round was divided into Champions Path (CH) and Main Path (MP).

Qualified teams for 2022–23 UEFA Europa League
Entry round		Teams			
Knockout round play-offs		(Netherlands) Ajax (UCL GS)	(Germany) Bayer Leverkusen (UCL GS)	(Spain) Barcelona (UCL GS)	(Portugal) Sporting CP (UCL GS)
Knockout round play-offs		(Austria) Red Bull Salzburg (UCL GS)	(Ukraine) Shakhtar Donetsk (UCL GS)	(Spain) Sevilla (UCL GS)	(Italy) Juventus (UCL GS)
Group stage		(Italy) Roma (6th)^{ECL}	(England) Arsenal (5th)	(England) Manchester United (6th)	(Spain) Real Betis (CW)
Group stage		(Spain) Real Sociedad (6th)	(Italy) Lazio (5th)	(Germany) Union Berlin (5th)	(Germany) SC Freiburg (6th)
Group stage		(France) Nantes (CW)	(France) Rennes (4th)	(Portugal) Braga (4th)	(Netherlands) Feyenoord (3rd)
Group stage		(Turkey) Trabzonspor (UCL CH PO)	(Serbia) Red Star Belgrade (UCL CH PO)	(Norway) Bodø/Glimt (UCL CH PO)	(Azerbaijan) Qarabağ (UCL CH PO)
Group stage		(Netherlands) PSV Eindhoven (UCL LP PO)	(Ukraine) Dynamo Kyiv (UCL LP PO)	(France) Monaco (UCL LP Q3)	(Austria) Sturm Graz (UCL LP Q3)
Group stage		(Belgium) Union Saint-Gilloise (UCL LP Q3)	(Denmark) Midtjylland (UCL LP Q3)		
Play-off round		(Belgium) Gent (CW)	Austria Wien (3rd)	(Scotland) Heart of Midlothian (3rd)	(Ukraine) Dnipro-1 (Abd-3rd)
Play-off round		(Turkey) Sivasspor (CW)	(Denmark) Silkeborg (3rd)	(Cyprus) Omonia (CW)	(Cyprus) Apollon Limassol (UCL CH Q3)
Play-off round		(Bulgaria) Ludogorets Razgrad (UCL CH Q3)	(Hungary) Ferencváros (UCL CH Q3)	(Lithuania) Žalgiris (UCL CH Q3)	(Armenia) Pyunik (UCL CH Q3)
Play-off round		(Moldova) Sheriff Tiraspol (UCL CH Q3)			
Third qualifying round	CH	(Switzerland) Zürich (UCL CH Q2)	(Greece) Olympiacos (UCL CH Q2)	(Sweden) Malmö FF (UCL CH Q2)	(Slovenia) Maribor (UCL CH Q2)
Third qualifying round	CH	(Slovakia) Slovan Bratislava (UCL CH Q2)	(Luxembourg) F91 Dudelange (UCL CH Q2)	(Republic of Ireland) Shamrock Rovers (UCL CH Q2)	(North Macedonia) Shkupi (UCL CH Q2)
Third qualifying round	CH	(Northern Ireland) Linfield (UCL CH Q2)	(Finland) HJK (UCL CH Q2)		
Third qualifying round	MP	(Serbia) Partizan (2nd)	(Czech Republic) Slovácko (CW)	(Turkey) Fenerbahçe (UCL LP Q2)	(Cyprus) AEK Larnaca (UCL LP Q2)

Notes

1. Russia (RUS): On 28 February 2022, Russian football clubs and national teams were suspended from FIFA and UEFA competitions due to the Russian invasion of Ukraine. On 2 May 2022, UEFA confirmed that Russian clubs would be excluded from the 2022–23 UEFA competitions.
2. Ukraine (UKR): The 2021–22 Ukrainian Cup was abandoned due to the Russian invasion of Ukraine. The berth reserved for the cup winners was transferred to the third-placed team of the league at the time of the abandonment, SC Dnipro-1, who were selected to play in the 2022–23 UEFA Europa League by the Ukrainian Association of Football.

== Schedule ==
The schedule of the competition was as follows. Matches were scheduled for Thursdays apart from the final, which took place on a Wednesday, though exceptionally could take place on Tuesdays or Wednesdays due to scheduling conflicts. Scheduled kick-off times starting from the group stage were 18:45 and 21:00 CEST/CET, though exceptionally could take place at 16:30 due to geographical reasons.

As the 2022 FIFA World Cup took place in Qatar between 20 November and 18 December 2022, the group stage commenced in the first week of September 2022 and concluded in the first week of November 2022 to make way for the World Cup.

The draws for the qualifying round were held at the UEFA headquarters in Nyon, Switzerland. The group stage draw took place in Istanbul, Turkey.

Schedule for 2022–23 UEFA Europa League
Phase	Round	Draw date	First leg	Second leg
Qualifying	Third qualifying round	18 July 2022	4 August 2022	11 August 2022
Play-offs	Play-off round	2 August 2022	18 August 2022	25 August 2022
Group stage	Matchday 1	26 August 2022	8 September 2022	
Group stage	Matchday 2	26 August 2022	15 September 2022	
Group stage	Matchday 3	26 August 2022	6 October 2022	
Group stage	Matchday 4	26 August 2022	13 October 2022	
Group stage	Matchday 5	26 August 2022	27 October 2022	
Group stage	Matchday 6	26 August 2022	3 November 2022	
Knockout phase	Knockout round play-offs	7 November 2022	16 February 2023	23 February 2023
Knockout phase	Round of 16	24 February 2023	9 March 2023	16 March 2023
Knockout phase	Quarter-finals	17 March 2023	13 April 2023	20 April 2023
Knockout phase	Semi-finals	17 March 2023	11 May 2023	18 May 2023
Knockout phase	Final	17 March 2023	31 May 2023 at Puskás Aréna, Budapest	

== Third qualifying round ==
The draw for the third qualifying round was held on 18 July 2022. The first legs were played on 4 August, and the second legs were played on 9 and 11 August 2022.

The winners of the ties advanced to the play-off round. The losers were transferred to the Europa Conference League play-off round of their respective path.

Team 1	Agg.	Team 2	1st leg	2nd leg
Champions Path
Malmö FF (Sweden)	5–2	(Luxembourg) F91 Dudelange	3–0	2–2
Shamrock Rovers (Republic of Ireland)	5–2	(North Macedonia) Shkupi	3–1	2–1
Linfield (Northern Ireland)	0–5	(Switzerland) Zürich	0–2	0–3
Olympiacos (Greece)	3–3 (4–3 p)	(Slovakia) Slovan Bratislava	1–1	2–2 (a.e.t.)
Maribor (Slovenia)	0–3	(Finland) HJK	0–2	0–1
Main Path
AEK Larnaca (Cyprus)	4–3	(Serbia) Partizan	2–1	2–2
Fenerbahçe (Turkey)	4–1	(Czech Republic) Slovácko	3–0	1–1

== Play-off round ==
The draw for the play-off round was held on 2 August 2022. The first legs were played on 18 August, and the second legs were played on 25 August 2022.

The winners of the ties advanced to the group stage. The losers were transferred to the Europa Conference League group stage.

Team 1	Agg.	Team 2	1st leg	2nd leg
Dnipro-1 (Ukraine)	1–5	(Cyprus) AEK Larnaca	1–2	0–3
Gent (Belgium)	0–4	(Cyprus) Omonia	0–2	0–2
Austria Wien	1–6	(Turkey) Fenerbahçe	0–2	1–4
Zürich (Switzerland)	3–1	(Scotland) Heart of Midlothian	2–1	1–0
HJK (Finland)	2–1	(Denmark) Silkeborg	1–0	1–1
Malmö FF (Sweden)	5–1	(Turkey) Sivasspor	3–1	2–0
Ferencváros (Hungary)	4–1	(Republic of Ireland) Shamrock Rovers	4–0	0–1
Apollon Limassol (Cyprus)	2–2 (1–3 p)	(Greece) Olympiacos	1–1	1–1 (a.e.t.)
Pyunik (Armenia)	0–0 (2–3 p)	(Moldova) Sheriff Tiraspol	0–0	0–0 (a.e.t.)
Ludogorets Razgrad (Bulgaria)	4–3	(Lithuania) Žalgiris	1–0	3–3 (a.e.t.)

== Group stage ==
Location of teams of the 2022–23 UEFA Europa League group stage.
Brown: Group A; Red: Group B; Orange: Group C; Yellow: Group D;
Green: Group E; Blue: Group F; Purple: Group G; Pink: Group H.

The draw for the group stage was held on 26 August 2022. The 32 teams were drawn into eight groups of four. For the draw, the teams were seeded into four pots, each of eight teams, based on their 2022 UEFA club coefficients. Teams from the same association could not be drawn into the same group.

Bodø/Glimt, Nantes, Union Berlin and Union Saint-Gilloise made their debut appearances in the group stage. Union Saint-Gilloise made their debut appearance in a UEFA competition group stage.

A total of 23 national associations were represented in the group stage.

=== Group A ===
Pos	Team	Pld	W	D	L	GF	GA	GD	Pts	Qualification	ARS	PSV	BOD	ZUR
1	(England) Arsenal	6	5	0	1	8	3	+5	15	Advance to round of 16	—	1–0	3–0	1–0
2	(Netherlands) PSV Eindhoven	6	4	1	1	15	4	+11	13	Advance to knockout round play-offs	2–0	—	1–1	5–0
3	(Norway) Bodø/Glimt	6	1	1	4	5	10	−5	4	Transfer to Europa Conference League	0–1	1–2	—	2–1
4	(Switzerland) Zürich	6	1	0	5	5	16	−11	3		1–2	1–5	2–1	—

Source: UEFA

=== Group B ===
Pos	Team	Pld	W	D	L	GF	GA	GD	Pts	Qualification	FEN	REN	AEK	DKV
1	(Turkey) Fenerbahçe	6	4	2	0	13	7	+6	14	Advance to round of 16	—	3–3	2–0	2–1
2	(France) Rennes	6	3	3	0	11	8	+3	12	Advance to knockout round play-offs	2–2	—	1–1	2–1
3	(Cyprus) AEK Larnaca	6	1	2	3	7	10	−3	5	Transfer to Europa Conference League	1–2	1–2	—	3–3
4	(Ukraine) Dynamo Kyiv	6	0	1	5	5	11	−6	1		0–2	0–1	0–1	—

Source: UEFA

=== Group C ===
Pos	Team	Pld	W	D	L	GF	GA	GD	Pts	Qualification	BET	ROM	LUD	HJK
1	(Spain) Real Betis	6	5	1	0	12	4	+8	16	Advance to round of 16	—	1–1	3–2	3–0
2	(Italy) Roma	6	3	1	2	11	7	+4	10	Advance to knockout round play-offs	1–2	—	3–1	3–0
3	(Bulgaria) Ludogorets Razgrad	6	2	1	3	8	9	−1	7	Transfer to Europa Conference League	0–1	2–1	—	2–0
4	(Finland) HJK	6	0	1	5	2	13	−11	1		0–2	1–2	1–1	—

Source: UEFA

=== Group D ===
Pos	Team	Pld	W	D	L	GF	GA	GD	Pts	Qualification	USG	UBE	BRA	MAL
1	(Belgium) Union Saint-Gilloise	6	4	1	1	11	7	+4	13	Advance to round of 16	—	0–1	3–3	3–2
2	(Germany) Union Berlin	6	4	0	2	4	2	+2	12	Advance to knockout round play-offs	0–1	—	1–0	1–0
3	(Portugal) Braga	6	3	1	2	9	7	+2	10	Transfer to Europa Conference League	1–2	1–0	—	2–1
4	(Sweden) Malmö FF	6	0	0	6	3	11	−8	0		0–2	0–1	0–2	—

Source: UEFA

=== Group E ===
Pos	Team	Pld	W	D	L	GF	GA	GD	Pts	Qualification	RSO	MUN	SHE	OMO
1	(Spain) Real Sociedad	6	5	0	1	10	2	+8	15 (Note: Tied on head-to-head results. Overall goal difference is used as the tiebreaker.)	Advance to round of 16	—	0–1	3–0	2–1
2	(England) Manchester United	6	5	0	1	10	3	+7	15	Advance to knockout round play-offs	0–1	—	3–0	1–0
3	(Moldova) Sheriff Tiraspol	6	2	0	4	4	10	−6	6	Transfer to Europa Conference League	0–2	0–2	—	1–0
4	(Cyprus) Omonia	6	0	0	6	3	12	−9	0		0–2	2–3	0–3	—

Source: UEFA

=== Group F ===
Pos	Team	Pld	W	D	L	GF	GA	GD	Pts	Qualification	FEY	MID	LAZ	STU
1	(Netherlands) Feyenoord	6	2	2	2	13	9	+4	8 (Note: Tied on head-to-head results. Overall goal difference is used as the tiebreaker. Between Feyenoord and Midtjylland, overall goals scored is used as the tiebreaker.)	Advance to round of 16	—	2–2	1–0	6–0
2	(Denmark) Midtjylland	6	2	2	2	12	8	+4	8	Advance to knockout round play-offs	2–2	—	5–1	2–0
3	(Italy) Lazio	6	2	2	2	9	11	−2	8	Transfer to Europa Conference League	4–2	2–1	—	2–2
4	(Austria) Sturm Graz	6	2	2	2	4	10	−6	8		1–0	1–0	0–0	—

Source: UEFA

=== Group G ===
Pos	Team	Pld	W	D	L	GF	GA	GD	Pts	Qualification	FRE	NAN	QRB	OLY
1	(Germany) SC Freiburg	6	4	2	0	13	3	+10	14	Advance to round of 16	—	2–0	2–1	1–1
2	(France) Nantes	6	3	0	3	6	11	−5	9	Advance to knockout round play-offs	0–4	—	2–1	2–1
3	(Azerbaijan) Qarabağ	6	2	2	2	9	5	+4	8	Transfer to Europa Conference League	1–1	3–0	—	0–0
4	(Greece) Olympiacos	6	0	2	4	2	11	−9	2		0–3	0–2	0–3	—

Source: UEFA

=== Group H ===
Pos	Team	Pld	W	D	L	GF	GA	GD	Pts	Qualification	FER	MON	TRA	ZVE
1	(Hungary) Ferencváros	6	3	1	2	8	9	−1	10 (Note: Head to head points: Ferencváros 4, Monaco 1.)	Advance to round of 16	—	1–1	3–2	2–1
2	(France) Monaco	6	3	1	2	9	8	+1	10	Advance to knockout round play-offs	0–1	—	3–1	4–1
3	(Turkey) Trabzonspor	6	3	0	3	11	9	+2	9	Transfer to Europa Conference League	1–0	4–0	—	2–1
4	(Serbia) Red Star Belgrade	6	2	0	4	9	11	−2	6		4–1	0–1	2–1	—

Source: UEFA

== Knockout phase ==
In the knockout phase, teams played against each other over two legs on a home-and-away basis, except for the one-match final. The mechanism of the draws for each round was as follows:

- In the draw for the knockout round play-offs, the eight group runners-up were seeded, and the eight Champions League group third-placed teams were unseeded. The seeded teams were drawn against the unseeded teams, with the seeded teams hosting the second leg. Teams from the same association could not be drawn against each other.
- In the draw for the round of 16, the eight group winners were seeded, and the eight winners of the knockout round play-offs were unseeded. Again, the seeded teams were drawn against the unseeded teams, with the seeded teams hosting the second leg. Teams from the same association could not be drawn against each other.
- In the draws for the quarter-finals onwards, there were no seedings, and teams from the same association could be drawn against each other. As the draws for the quarter-finals and semi-finals were held together before the quarter-finals were played, the identity of the quarter-final winners was not known at the time of the semi-final draw. A draw was also held to determine which semi-final winner would be designated as the "home" team for the final (for administrative purposes as it was played at a neutral venue).

=== Bracket ===
Knockout round play-offs
(Italy) Juventus	1	3	4
(France) Nantes	1	0	1
(Portugal) Sporting CP	1	4	5
(Denmark) Midtjylland	1	0	1
(Spain) Barcelona	2	1	3
(England) Manchester United	2	2	4
(Spain) Sevilla	3	0	3
(Netherlands) PSV Eindhoven	0	2	2
(Ukraine) Shakhtar Donetsk (p)	2	1	3 (5)
(France) Rennes	1	2	3 (4)
(Austria) Red Bull Salzburg	1	0	1
(Italy) Roma	0	2	2
(Germany) Bayer Leverkusen (p)	2	3	5 (5)
(France) Monaco	3	2	5 (3)
(Netherlands) Ajax	0	1	1
(Germany) Union Berlin	0	3	3

Round of 16
(Italy) Juventus	1	2	3
(Germany) SC Freiburg	0	0	0
(Portugal) Sporting CP (p)	2	1	3 (5)
(England) Arsenal	2	1	3 (3)
(England) Manchester United	4	1	5
(Spain) Real Betis	1	0	1
(Spain) Sevilla	2	0	2
(Turkey) Fenerbahçe	0	1	1
(Ukraine) Shakhtar Donetsk	1	1	2
(Netherlands) Feyenoord	1	7	8
(Italy) Roma	2	0	2
(Spain) Real Sociedad	0	0	0
(Germany) Bayer Leverkusen	2	2	4
(Hungary) Ferencváros	0	0	0
(Germany) Union Berlin	3	0	3
(Belgium) Union Saint-Gilloise	3	3	6

Quarter-finals
(Italy) Juventus	1	1	2
(Portugal) Sporting CP	0	1	1
(England) Manchester United	2	0	2
(Spain) Sevilla	2	3	5
(Netherlands) Feyenoord	1	1	2
(Italy) Roma (a.e.t.)	0	4	4
(Germany) Bayer Leverkusen	1	4	5
(Belgium) Union Saint-Gilloise	1	1	2

Semi-finals
(Italy) Juventus	1	1	2
(Spain) Sevilla (a.e.t.)	1	2	3
(Italy) Roma	1	0	1
(Germany) Bayer Leverkusen	0	0	0

Final
31 May – Budapest
(Spain) Sevilla (p)	1 (4)
(Italy) Roma	1 (1)

=== Knockout round play-offs ===
The draw for the knockout round play-offs was held on 7 November 2022, 13:00 CET. The first legs were played on 16 February, and the second legs were played on 23 February 2023.

Team 1	Agg.	Team 2	1st leg	2nd leg
Barcelona (Spain)	3–4	(England) Manchester United	2–2	1–2
Juventus (Italy)	4–1	(France) Nantes	1–1	3–0
Sporting CP (Portugal)	5–1	(Denmark) Midtjylland	1–1	4–0
Shakhtar Donetsk (Ukraine)	3–3 (5–4 p)	(France) Rennes	2–1	1–2 (a.e.t.)
Ajax (Netherlands)	1–3	(Germany) Union Berlin	0–0	1–3
Bayer Leverkusen (Germany)	5–5 (5–3 p)	(France) Monaco	2–3	3–2 (a.e.t.)
Sevilla (Spain)	3–2	(Netherlands) PSV Eindhoven	3–0	0–2
Red Bull Salzburg (Austria)	1–2	(Italy) Roma	1–0	0–2

=== Round of 16 ===
The draw for the round of 16 was held on 24 February 2023, 12:00 CET. The first legs were played on 9 March, and the second legs were played on 16 March 2023.

Team 1	Agg.	Team 2	1st leg	2nd leg
Union Berlin (Germany)	3–6	(Belgium) Union Saint-Gilloise	3–3	0–3
Sevilla (Spain)	2–1	(Turkey) Fenerbahçe	2–0	0–1
Juventus (Italy)	3–0	(Germany) SC Freiburg	1–0	2–0
Bayer Leverkusen (Germany)	4–0	(Hungary) Ferencváros	2–0	2–0
Sporting CP (Portugal)	3–3 (5–3 p)	(England) Arsenal	2–2	1–1 (a.e.t.)
Manchester United (England)	5–1	(Spain) Real Betis	4–1	1–0
Roma (Italy)	2–0	(Spain) Real Sociedad	2–0	0–0
Shakhtar Donetsk (Ukraine)	2–8	(Netherlands) Feyenoord	1–1	1–7

=== Quarter-finals ===
The draw for the quarter-finals was held on 17 March 2023, 13:00 CET. The first legs were played on 13 April, and the second legs were played on 20 April 2023.

Team 1	Agg.	Team 2	1st leg	2nd leg
Manchester United (England)	2–5	(Spain) Sevilla	2–2	0–3
Juventus (Italy)	2–1	(Portugal) Sporting CP	1–0	1–1
Bayer Leverkusen (Germany)	5–2	(Belgium) Union Saint-Gilloise	1–1	4–1
Feyenoord (Netherlands)	2–4	(Italy) Roma	1–0	1–4 (a.e.t.)

=== Semi-finals ===
The draw for the semi-finals was held on 17 March 2023, 13:00 CET, after the quarter-final draw. The first legs were played on 11 May, and the second legs were played on 18 May 2023.

Team 1	Agg.	Team 2	1st leg	2nd leg
Juventus (Italy)	2–3	(Spain) Sevilla	1–1	1–2 (a.e.t.)
Roma (Italy)	1–0	(Germany) Bayer Leverkusen	1–0	0–0

=== Final ===
The final was played on 31 May 2023 at the Puskás Aréna in Budapest. A draw was held on 17 March 2023, after the quarter-final and semi-final draws, to determine the "home" team for administrative purposes.

31 May 2023
21:00 UTC+2

Sevilla (Spain)	1–1 (a.e.t.)	(Italy) Roma
Mancini 55' (o.g.)	Report	Dybala 35'
Penalties
Ocampos (penalty scored); Lamela (penalty scored); Rakitić (penalty scored); Montiel (penalty scored)	4–1	(penalty scored) Cristante; (penalty missed) Mancini; (penalty missed) Ibañez

Puskás Aréna, Budapest
Attendance: 61,476
Referee: Anthony Taylor (England)

== Statistics ==
Statistics exclude qualifying round and play-off round.

=== Top goalscorers ===
Rank	Player	Team	Goals	Minutes played
1	(England) Marcus Rashford	(England) Manchester United	6	560
1	(Nigeria) Victor Boniface	(Belgium) Union Saint-Gilloise	6	777
3	(Mexico) Santiago Giménez	(Netherlands) Feyenoord	5	432
3	(Argentina) Paulo Dybala	(Italy) Roma	5	668
5	(Portugal) Vitinha	(Portugal) Braga	4	406
5	(France) Wissam Ben Yedder	(France) Monaco	4	528
5	(Argentina) Ángel Di María	(Italy) Juventus	4	554
5	(Morocco) Youssef En-Nesyri	(Spain) Sevilla	4	720
5	(Germany) Robin Knoche	(Germany) Union Berlin	4	892
5	(Italy) Lorenzo Pellegrini	(Italy) Roma	4	1167

=== Team of the season ===
The UEFA technical study group selected the following players as the team of the tournament.

Pos.	Player	Team
GK	(Morocco) Yassine Bounou	(Spain) Sevilla
DF	(Argentina) Marcos Acuña	(Spain) Sevilla
DF	(England) Chris Smalling	(Italy) Roma
DF	(Germany) Jonathan Tah	(Germany) Bayer Leverkusen
DF	(Spain) Jesús Navas	(Spain) Sevilla
MF	(Italy) Lorenzo Pellegrini	(Italy) Roma
MF	(Serbia) Nemanja Matić	(Italy) Roma
MF	(Croatia) Ivan Rakitić	(Spain) Sevilla
FW	(England) Marcus Rashford	(England) Manchester United
FW	(Nigeria) Victor Boniface	(Belgium) Union Saint-Gilloise
FW	(Argentina) Paulo Dybala	(Italy) Roma

=== Player of the Season ===
- (Spain) Jesús Navas ( (Spain) Sevilla)

=== Young Player of the Season ===
- (Germany) Florian Wirtz ( (Germany) Bayer Leverkusen)

== See also ==
- 2022–23 UEFA Champions League
- 2022–23 UEFA Europa Conference League
- 2023 UEFA Super Cup
- 2022–23 UEFA Women's Champions League
- 2022–23 UEFA Youth League
