= 2024–25 Royale Union Saint-Gilloise season =

Royale Union Saint-Gilloise
2024–25 season
- Chairman: Alex Muzio
- Manager: Sébastien Pocognoli
- Stadium: Joseph Marien Stadium
- Belgian Pro League: 1st (champions)
- Belgian Cup: Quarter-finals
- Belgian Super Cup: Winners
- UEFA Champions League: Third qualifying round
- UEFA Europa League: Knockout phase play-offs
- Top goalscorer: League: Promise David (19); All: Promise David (24)
- Biggest win: 4–0 (vs. Genk); 0–4 (vs. Beerschot); 5–1 (vs. Antwerp); 0–4 (vs. Antwerp)
- Biggest defeat: 1–5 (vs. Antwerp)
Home colours	Away colours

The 2024–25 season was Royale Union Saint-Gilloise's 127th season in existence and fourth consecutive in the Belgian Pro League.

== Season summary ==
The club won the Belgian Pro League for the twelfth time in their history and the first time since 1934–35. They also competed in and won the Belgian Super Cup for the first time in their history beating Club Brugge.

The club also reached the quarter-finals of the Belgian Cup.

In Europe they competed in the UEFA Europa League following their defeat in the qualifying rounds of the UEFA Champions League, the progressed from the league phase but lost in the knockout round play-offs.

== Players ==
=== First-team squad ===
As of 2 February 2025

No.	Player	Position(s)	Nationality	Place of birth	Date of birth (age)	Signed from	Date signed	Fee	Contract end
Goalkeepers
1	Vic Chambaere	GK	(Belgium)	Roeselare	10 January 2003 (age 23)	(Belgium) Genk	1 July 2024	Free transfer	30 June 2028
14	Joachim Imbrechts	GK	(Sweden)	(Belgium) Ixelles	9 October 2001 (age 24)	Academy	1 July 2022	—N/a	30 June 2025
49	Anthony Moris	GK	(Luxembourg)	(Belgium) Arlon	29 April 1990 (age 36)	(Belgium) Virton	30 July 2020	Free transfer	30 June 2027
Defenders
5	Kevin Mac Allister	DF	(Argentina)	Buenos Aires	7 November 1997 (age 28)	(Argentina) Argentinos Juniors	12 July 2023	€1,500,000	30 June 2026
16	Christian Burgess	DF	(England)	London	7 October 1991 (age 34)	(England) Portsmouth	7 July 2020	Free transfer	30 June 2025
19	Guillaume François	DF	(Belgium)	Libramont	3 June 1990 (age 36)	(Belgium) Virton	12 August 2020	Free transfer	30 June 2025
26	Ross Sykes	DF	(England)	Burnley	26 March 1999 (age 27)	(England) Accrington	1 July 2022	€280,000	30 June 2026
28	Koki Machida	DF	(Japan)	Ibaraki	25 August 1997 (age 28)	(Japan) Kashima Antlers	1 July 2023	€1,000,000	30 June 2026
48	Fedde Leysen	DF	(Belgium)	Unknown	9 July 2003 (age 22)	(Netherlands) Jong PSV	1 July 2023	Free transfer	30 June 2026
85	Arnaud Dony	DF	(Belgium)	Unknown	8 May 2004 (age 22)	(Belgium) STVV U21	1 July 2022	Free transfer	30 June 2025
-	Mamadou Barry	DF	(Senegal)	Unknown	20 March 2005 (age 21)	(Norway) Tromsø	27 January 2025	Undisclosed	30 June 2029
Midfielders
4	Mathias Rasmussen	MF	(Norway)	Lyngdal	25 November 1997 (age 28)	(Norway) Brann	1 July 2023	€1,200,000	30 June 2027
6	Kamiel Van de Perre	MF	(Belgium)	Unknown	12 February 2004 (age 22)	(Belgium) Jong Genk	1 July 2024	Free transfer	30 June 2028
10	Anouar Ait El Hadj	MF	(Belgium)	Molenbeek	20 April 2002 (age 24)	(Belgium) Genk	13 July 2024	€1,500,000	30 June 2028
21	Alessio Castro-Montes	MF	(Belgium)	Sint-Truiden	17 May 1997 (age 29)	(Belgium) Gent	2 September 2023	€2,000,000	30 June 2026
23	Sofiane Boufal	MF	(Morocco)	(France) Paris	17 September 1993 (age 32)	Free agent	3 September 2024	—N/a	30 June 2026
24	Charles Vanhoutte	MF	(Belgium)	Kortrijk	16 September 1998 (age 27)	(Belgium) Cercle Brugge	1 July 2023	€1,000,000	30 June 2027
27	Noah Sadiki	MF	(Democratic Republic of the Congo)	(Belgium) Brussels	17 December 2004 (age 21)	(Belgium) Anderlecht	27 July 2023	€1,400,000	30 June 2027
Forwards
9 (Note: Used shirt number "89" until the shirt number "9" became vacant)	Franjo Ivanović	FW	(Croatia)	(Austria) Schwaz	1 October 2003 (age 22)	(Croatia) Rijeka	31 August 2024	Unknown	30 June 2028
11	Henok Teklab	FW	(Germany)	Frankfurt am Main	16 November 1998 (age 27)	(Germany) Preußen Münster	1 July 2023	€400,000	30 June 2027
12	Promise David	FW	(Canada)	(Canada) Brampton	3 July 2001 (age 24)	(Estonia) Kalju	2 July 2024	Unknown	30 June 2027
13	Kevin Rodríguez	FW	(Ecuador)	Ibarra	4 March 2000 (age 26)	(Ecuador) Independiente	1 September 2023	€4,500,000	30 June 2027
25	Anan Khalaili	FW	(Israel)	Haifa	3 September 2004 (age 21)	(Israel) Maccabi Haifa	1 July 2024	€7,500,000	30 June 2028
77	Mohammed Fuseini	FW	(Ghana)	Unknown	16 May 2002 (age 24)	(Austria) Sturm Graz	2 July 2024	Unknown	30 June 2027
-	Marc Giger	FW	(Switzerland)	Zurich	27 March 2004 (age 22)	(Switzerland) Schaffhausen	31 January 2025	Undisclosed	30 June 2029

== Transfers ==
=== In ===
Date	Position	Nationality	Player	From	Fee	Ref.
30 June 2024	Defender	(Belgium)	Viktor Boone	(Belgium) Lierse	Return from loan	
1 July 2024	Midfielder	(Belgium)	Kamiel Van de Perre	(Belgium) Jong Genk	Free transfer	
1 July 2024	Goalkeeper	(Belgium)	Vic Chambaere	(Belgium) Genk	Free transfer	
1 July 2024	Forward	(Israel)	Anan Khalaili	(Israel) Maccabi Haifa	Undisclosed	
2 July 2024	Forward	(Ghana)	Mohammed Fuseini	(Austria) Sturm Graz	Undisclosed	
2 July 2024	Forward	(Canada)	Promise "Tobi" David	(Estonia) Kalju	Undisclosed	
13 July 2024	Midfielder	(Belgium)	Anouar Ait El Hadj	(Belgium) Genk	Undisclosed	
31 August 2024	Forward	(Croatia)	Franjo Ivanović	(Croatia) Rijeka	Undisclosed	
3 September 2024	Midfielder	(Morocco)	Sofiane Boufal	Free agent	Free transfer	
4 September 2024	Midfielder	(Senegal)	Ousseynou Niang	(Latvia) Riga	Undisclosed	
27 January 2025	Defender	(Senegal)	Mamadou Thierno Barry	(Norway) Tromsø	Undisclosed	
31 January 2025	Forward	(Switzerland)	Marc Giger	(Switzerland) Schaffhausen	Undisclosed	

=== Out ===
Date	Position	Nationality	Player	To	Fee	Ref.
30 June 2024	Goalkeeper	(Austria)	Heinz Lindner	(Austria) Sion	Return from loan	
1 July 2024	Defender	(Belgium)	Viktor Boone	(Belgium) Lierse	Free transfer	
12 July 2024	Forward	(Sweden)	Gustaf Nilsson	(Belgium) Club Brugge	Undisclosed (Note: Transfer fee reported as €6,000,000)	
26 August 2024	Forward	(Spain)	Cameron Puertas	(Saudi Arabia) Al Qadsiah	Undisclosed (Note: Transfer fee reported as €15,000,000)	
7 January 2025	Forward	(Mali)	Mamadou Traoré	(Spain) CD Castellón	Free transfer	
2 February 2025	Midfielder	(Madagascar)	Loïc Lapoussin	(Belgium) STVV	Undisclosed	

=== Loaned In ===
Date	Position	Nationality	Player	From	Fee	Ref.

=== Loaned Out ===
Date	Position	Nationality	Player	To	Ref.
1 July 2024	Midfielder	(Belgium)	Nathan Huygevelde	(Belgium) Kortrijk (Note: Includes option to buy)	
6 July 2024	Forward	(Algeria)	Mohamed Amoura	(Germany) VfL Wolfsburg (Note: Includes mandatory buy option)	
6 September 2024	Forward	(Germany)	Dennis Eckert	(Belgium) Standard Liège (Note: Includes option to buy)	
1 January 2025	Forward	(Belgium)	Elton Kabangu	(Scotland) Hearts (Note: Includes option to buy)	
1 January 2025	Forward	(Finland)	Casper Terho	(Germany) Paderborn (Note: Includes option to buy)	
26 January 2025	Forward	(Ivory Coast)	Lazare Amani	(Belgium) Standard Liège (Note: Includes option to buy)	

== New contracts ==
=== First team ===
Date	Pos.	Player	Contract length	Ref.
11 July 2024	DF	(Belgium) Guillaume François	One year	

== Pre-season and friendlies ==
Win Draw Loss Fixtures

2 July 2024	Nijlen	0–8	Union Saint-Gilloise	Nijlen, Belgium
19:00 CEST

7 July 2024	Patro Eisden	2–2	Union Saint-Gilloise	Nijlen, Belgium
16:00 CEST
Note: Two-hour game consisting of four 30 minute quarters

12 July 2024	Go Ahead Eagles	1–2	Union Saint-Gilloise
--:-- CEST

13 July 2024	PAOK	1–2	Union Saint-Gilloise
16:00 CEST

17 July 2024	Sporting CP	2–2	Union Saint-Gilloise	Lisbon, Portugal
--:-- CEST				Stadium: Estádio José Alvalade

21 July 2024	Lierse	3–4	Union Saint-Gilloise	Nijlen, Belgium
13:30 CEST

== Competitions ==
=== Overall record ===
Competition	First match	Last match	Starting round	Final position	Record							
Competition	First match	Last match	Starting round	Final position	Pld	W	D	L	GF	GA	GD	Win %
Belgian Pro League	27 July 2024	15 March 2025	Matchday 1	3rd	30	15	10	5	49	25	+24	50.00
Belgian Pro League Champions' play-offs	29 March 2025	25 May 2025	3rd	Winners	10	9	1	0	22	3	+19	90.00
Super Cup	20 July 2024		Final	Winners	1	1	0	0	2	1	+1	100.00
Belgian Cup	30 October 2024	8 January 2025	Seventh round	Quarter-finals	3	2	0	1	7	7	+0	66.67
UEFA Champions League	7 August 2024	13 August 2024	Third qualifying round	Third qualifying round	2	0	0	2	1	4	−3	0.00
UEFA Europa League	26 September 2024	20 February 2025	Group stage	Knockout round play-offs	10	4	2	4	10	11	−1	40.00
Total					56	31	13	12	91	51	+40	55.36

Last updated: complete
Source: Competitions

=== Belgian Pro League ===
==== League table ====
Pos	Team	Pld	W	D	L	GF	GA	GD	Pts	Qualification or relegation
1	Genk	30	21	5	4	55	33	+22	68	Qualification for the Champions' Play-offs (Note: The regular season winner will qualify for the 2025–26 UEFA Europa League if not earning 2025–26 UEFA Champions League in the playoff.)
2	Club Brugge	30	17	8	5	65	36	+29	59	Qualification for the Champions' play-offs
3	Union SG	30	15	10	5	49	25	+24	55	Qualification for the Champions' play-offs
4	Anderlecht	30	15	6	9	50	27	+23	51	Qualification for the Champions' play-offs
5	Antwerp	30	12	10	8	47	32	+15	46	Qualification for the Champions' play-offs

Source: Jupiler Pro League (in Dutch), Soccerway
Rules for classification: 1) Points; 2) Matches won; 3) Goal difference; 4) Goals scored; 5) Away matches won; 6) Away goal difference; 7) Away goals scored; 8) Play-off.

==== Results summary ====
Overall								Home						Away					
Pld	W	D	L	GF	GA	GD	Pts	W	D	L	GF	GA	GD	W	D	L	GF	GA	GD
30	15	10	5	49	25	+24	55	10	3	2	29	11	+18	5	7	3	20	14	+6

Last updated: complete.
Source: Competitions

==== Results by round ====
Round	1	2	3	4	5	6	7	8	9	10	11	12	13	14	15	16	17	18	19	20	21	22	23	24	25	26	27	28	29	30
Ground	A	H	A	H	A	H	A	A	H	A	H	H	A	H	A	H	A	H	H	A	A	H	A	H	A	H	A	H	H	A
Result	D	W	L	W	D	D	L	D	W	D	D	L	D	W	D	W	D	W	D	W	W	W	W	W	W	L	W	W	W	L
Position	12	4	8	4	5	8	11	12	8	10	10	10	10	7	9	7	7	6	6	5	3	3	3	3	3	3	3	3	3	3

A = Away; H = Home; W = Win; D = Draw; L = Loss

==== Matches ====
Win Draw Loss Fixtures

27 July 2024 1	Dender	0–0	Union Saint-Gilloise	Denderleeuw
16:00 CEST	Viltard (yellow card) 54'; Pupe (yellow card) 77'; Rôdes (yellow card) 88'; Soaldio (yellow card) 90+3'	Report	Puertas (yellow card) 33'; Leysen (yellow card) 83'	Stadium: Van Roystadion; Attendance: 3,500; Referee: Wesli De Cremer

2 August 2024 2	Union Saint-Gilloise	3–1	Beerschot	Brussels
20:45 CEST	Eckert 2'; Mac Allister (yellow card) 24', (goal) 42'; Puertas 83'; Khalaili (yellow card) 87'	Report	Keita (yellow card) 36', (goal) 48'; Cagro (yellow card) 64'	Stadium: Joseph Marien Stadium; Attendance: 7,929; Referee: Nicolas Laforge

10 August 2024 3	Westerlo	4–3	Union Saint-Gilloise	Westerlo
18:15 CEST	Hasoplat 14', (yellow card) 75'; Mebude 17'; Sayyadmanesh 32', (yellow card) 50'; Reynolds 54'; Rommens (yellow card) 58'; Van den Keybus (yellow card) 87'	Report	Rodriguez 5'; Khalaili (yellow card) 39'; Leysen (yellow card) 45'; Fuseini 70'; David 90+2'; Terho (yellow card) 90+8'	Stadium: Het Kuipje; Attendance: 5,500; Referee: Jasper Vergoote
Note: (red card) 90+7' Sébastien Pocognoli

16 August 2024 4	Union Saint-Gilloise	1–0	Charleroi	Brussels
20:45 CEST	Moris (yellow card) 90'; Fuseini 90+3' (pen.)	Report	Koné (yellow card) 34'; Keita (yellow card) 47'; Camara (yellow card) 49'; Petris (yellow card) 54'	Stadium: Joseph Marien Stadium; Attendance: 7,882; Referee: Nathan Verboomen

25 August 2024 5	STVV	0–0	Union Saint-Gilloise	Sint-Truiden
16:00 CEST	Vanwesemael (yellow card) 28'; Zahiroleslam (yellow card) 63'; Delpupo (red card) 86'	Report	(yellow card) 63' Leysen; (yellow card) 79' Fuseini; (yellow card) 84' Sadiki	Stadium: Stayen; Attendance: 4,513; Referee: Lawrence Visser

1 September 2024 6	Union Saint-Gilloise	0–0	Anderlecht	Brussels
18:30 CEST	Rodriguez (penalty missed) 22'; Terho (yellow card) 41'; Ait El Hadj (yellow card) 45+7'; Vanhoutte (yellow card) 90+5'	Report	Zanka (yellow card) 16'; Rits (yellow card) 36'; Simić (yellow card) 44'; Sardella (yellow card) 84'	Stadium: Joseph Marien Stadium; Attendance: 8,489; Referee: Nicolas Laforge

15 September 2024 7	Antwerp	2–0	Union Saint-Gilloise	Antwerp
13:30 CEST	Janssen 53', (yellow card) 54'; Odoi (yellow card) 57'; Chery 62'	Report	Mac Allister (yellow card) 45+2' (yellow-red card) 60'; Ivanović (yellow card) 60'	Stadium: Bosuilstadion; Attendance: 15,000; Referee: Lawrence Visser

20 September 2024 8	Standard Liège	0–0	Union Saint-Gilloise	Liège
20:45 CEST	Šutalo (yellow card) 84'	Report	Sadiki (yellow card) 83'	Stadium: Stade Maurice Dufrasne; Attendance: 18,983; Referee: Jan Boterberg

29 September 2024 9	Union Saint-Gilloise	3–0	Kortrijk	Brussels
16:00 CEST	Fuseini 17'; Castro-Montes (yellow card) 25'; Niang (yellow card) 50'; Ivanović 76'	Report	El Idrissy (yellow card) 5'; Mehssatou (yellow card) 33'; Silva 51' (o.g.); Kadri (yellow card) 65'	Stadium: Joseph Marien Stadium; Attendance: 5,735; Referee: Bert Put

6 October 2024 10	Club Brugge	1–1	Union Saint-Gilloise	Brugge
13:30 CEST	Mechele 82'; Jashari (yellow card) 85'	Report	Castro-Montes (yellow card) 32'; Fuseini (yellow card) 35'; Niang (yellow card) 48'; Ivanović 52', (yellow card) 58'; Mac Allister (yellow card) 83'; Amani (yellow card) 86'	Stadium: Jan Breydel Stadium; Attendance: 22,450; Referee: Erik Lambrechts

19 October 2024 11	Union Saint-Gilloise	0–0	Gent	Brussels
20:45 CEST	Burgess (yellow card) 46'; David (yellow card) 88'	Report	Ito (yellow card) 4'; Torunarigha (yellow card) 45'; Brown (yellow card) 67'; Gambor (yellow card) 90+5'	Stadium: Joseph Marien Stadium; Attendance: 8,600; Referee: Nathan Verboomen

27 October 2024 12	Union Saint-Gilloise	1–3	Cercle Brugge	Brussels
19:15 CEST	Fuseini 8'; David (yellow card) 88'; Sykes (yellow card) 90+6'	Report	Augusto 52'; Kakou 55'; Nazinho (yellow card) 64'; Somers (yellow card) 73'; Denkey 90+8', (yellow card) 90+9'	Stadium: Joseph Marien Stadium; Attendance: 7,186; Referee: Bram Van Driessche

2 November 2024 13	Mechelen	1–1	Union Saint-Gilloise	Mechelen
20:45 CET	Touba (yellow card) 42', (goal) 90+4'; Marsà (yellow card) 46'; Mrabti (yellow card) 89'		David 20' (pen.); Niang (yellow card) 25'; Amani (yellow card) 33'; Burgess (yellow card) 77'; Van de Perre (yellow card) 90+1'; Moris (yellow card) 90+3'	Stadium: AFAS Stadion; Attendance: 13,435; Referee: Bert Put
Note: Game was temporarily suspended in second half injury time due to projectiles launches by home fans towards Union goalkeeper Anthony Moris

10 November 2024 14	Union Saint-Gilloise	4–0	Genk	Brussels
18:30 CET	Lapoussin 5'; David 45+1', 64'; Sadiki 51'; Machida (yellow card) 55'; Burgess (yellow card) 73'	Report	Sadick (yellow card) 51'; Heynen (yellow card) 56'; van Crombrugge (yellow card) 57'; Tolu (yellow card) 74'	Stadium: Joseph Marien Stadium; Attendance: 8,427; Referee: Erik Lambrechts

24 November 2024 15	OH Leuven	1–1	Union Saint-Gilloise	Leuven
16:00 CET	Banzuzi (yellow card) 26'; Schrijvers 41' (pen.); Ricca (yellow card) 79'		Schrijvers 11' (o.g.); Lapoussin (yellow card) 23'; Sykes (yellow card) 60'; Vanhoutte (red card) 72'; Boufal (yellow card) 77'	Stadium: Den Dreef; Attendance: 8,702; Referee: Jan Boterberg

1 December 2024 16	Union Saint-Gilloise	2–1	Antwerp	Brussels
18:30 CET	Mac Allister (yellow card) 13', (goal) 45+5'; Machida (yellow card) 40' (yellow-red card) 49'; Burgess (yellow card) 45+1'; Sadiki (yellow card) 69'; Sykes 69'		Janssen 1'; Kerk (yellow card) 59'; Bataille (yellow card) 68'; Costa (yellow card) 72'; Valencia (yellow card) 75'; Odoi (yellow card) 90+4'	Stadium: Joseph Marien Stadium; Attendance: 8,004; Referee: Nicolas Laforge

8 December 2024 17	Cercle Brugge	0–0	Union Saint-Gilloise	Brugge
16:00 CET	Van der Bruggen (yellow card) 29'; Somers (yellow card) 36'; Magnée (red card) 72'; Kakou (yellow card) 90+7'		Mac Allister (yellow card) 62'; Leysen (yellow card) 90+4'	Stadium: Jan Breydel Stadium; Attendance: 4,816; Referee: Lothar D'Hondt

15 December 2024 18	Union Saint-Gilloise	3–1	Westerlo	Brussels
16:00 CET	Boufal (yellow card) 33'; Ivanović 40', 45', 52'; David (yellow card) 90+4'	Report	Haspolat (yellow card) 16'; Vušković (yellow card) 45+3'; Devine (yellow card) 50'; Bos 54'	Stadium: Joseph Marien Stadium; Attendance: 7,112; Referee: Kevin Van Damme

22 December 2024 19	Union Saint-Gilloise	2–2	Club Brugge	Brussels
18:30 CET	Ivanović 45+3'; Nielsen 59' (o.g.); Mac Allister (yellow card) 77'; Burgess (yellow card) 84'	Report	Talbi 66'; Jutglà (yellow card) 68'; Nilsson 78'; Romero (yellow card) 90+6'	Stadium: Joseph Marien Stadium; Referee: Lawrence Visser

26 December 2024 20	Gent	1–3	Union Saint-Gilloise	Ghent
20:45 CET	Guðjohnsen 60'	Report	David 30'; Sykes 51'; El Hadj 54'; Khalaily (yellow card) 60'	Stadium: Ghelamco Arena; Referee: Nicolas Laforge

11 January 2025 21	Charleroi	1–2	Union Saint-Gilloise	Charleroi
20:45 CET	Štulić 13'; Petris (yellow card) 38'; Bernier (yellow card) 49'; Guiagon (yellow card) 65'; Keita (yellow card) 70'	Report	Vanhoutte (yellow card) 22'; David (yellow card) 42'; Castro-Montes 59'; Ivanović 63'; Burgess (yellow card) 71'	Stadium: Stade du Pays de Charleroi; Referee: Lothar D'Hondt
Note: Game was suspended for fifteen minutes as a result of Charleroi fans' use of pyrotechnics causing the stadium to fill with smoke.

19 January 2025 22	Union Saint-Gilloise	1–0	OH Leuven	Brussels
16:00 CET	David 14' (pen.); Fuseini (yellow card) 90'	Report	Leysen (yellow card) 13'; Kuruçay (yellow card) 73', (red card) 81'; Banzuzi (yellow card) 88'; Schrijvers (yellow card) 90'	Stadium: Joseph Marien Stadium

26 January 2025 23	Beerschot	0–4	Union Saint-Gilloise	Antwerp
16:00 CET	Al-Ghamdi (red card) 33'	Report	Ivanović 16', 36'; Niang 18'; Khalaily (yellow card) 45+3'; David 65'	Stadium: Olympisch Stadion

2 February 2025 24	Union Saint-Gilloise	2–1	STVV	Brussels
16:00 CET	Mac Allister (yellow card) 20'; Niang (yellow card) 36'; David (yellow card) 47', (goal) 60' (pen.); Ivanović 90+6' (pen.)	Report	Bertaccini 76', (yellow card) 90'; Fujita (yellow card) 84'; Patris (yellow card) 88'; Zé (yellow card) 89'; Kokubo (yellow card) 90+1'	Stadium: Joseph Marien Stadium

9 February 2025 25	Kortrijk	1–2	Union Saint-Gilloise	Kortrijk
16:00 CET	Mampassi (yellow card) 16'; Guèye (yellow card) 75'; Duverne 90+1'	Report	Sykes (yellow card) 12'; Fuseini 34'; Niang (yellow card) 45+1'; Vanhoutte 66'	Stadium: Guldensporen Stadion

16 February 2025 26	Union Saint-Gilloise	0–1	Mechelen	Brussels
16:00 CET	David (yellow card) 50'; Boufal (yellow card) 80'; Sykes (yellow card) 86'; Sadiki (yellow card) 90+5'		Raman 42'; Touba (yellow card) 42'	Stadium: Joseph Marien Stadium

23 February 2025 27	Anderlecht	0–2	Union Saint-Gilloise	Anderlecht
18:30 CET	Sardella (yellow card) 48'; Maamar (yellow card) 50'; Vázquez (yellow card) 88'	Report	Khalaily 33'; Boufal (yellow card) 45+3'; Niang 70'; Mac Allister (yellow card) 72'	Stadium: Lotto Park

1 March 2025 28	Union Saint-Gilloise	4–1	Dender	Brussels
20:45 CET	Rasmussen 28'; Ait El Hadj 32'; David 53' (pen.); Burgess (yellow card) 79'; Fuseini 86'	Report	Scheidler 75'; Viltard (yellow card) 78'; Holmes (yellow card) 88'	Stadium: Joseph Marien Stadium

9 March 2025 29	Union Saint-Gilloise	3–0	Standard Liège	Brussels
19:15 CET	David 21'; Burgess (yellow card) 43'; Rasmussen (yellow card) 51'; David 56'; Ivanović 82'		O'Neill (yellow card) 56' (yellow-red card) 59'; Lawrence (yellow card) 77'	Stadium: Joseph Marien Stadium

15 March 2025 30	Genk	2–1	Union Saint-Gilloise	Genk
20:45 CET	Heynen (yellow card) 54'; Tolu 69'; Hyeon-gyu 83'	Report	Ait El Hadj 89'	Stadium: Cegeka Arena

==== Champions' play-offs ====
===== League table =====
Pos	Team	Pld	W	D	L	GF	GA	GD	Pts	Qualification or relegation	USG	CLU	GNK	AND	ANT	GNT
1	Union SG (C)	10	9	1	0	22	3	+19	56	Qualification for the Champions League league phase		0–0	1–0	2–0	5–1	3–1
2	Club Brugge	10	7	2	1	21	6	+15	53	Qualification for the Champions League third qualifying round	0–1		1–0	2–0	1–1	4–1
3	Genk	10	4	1	5	14	11	+3	47	Qualification for the Europa League play-off round (Note: Club Brugge won the 2024–25 Belgian Cup and qualified for the Champions League through finishing second, the Europa League play-off round berth was therefore transferred to regular season winners Genk.)	1–2	0–2		2–1	0–1	4–0
4	Anderlecht	10	3	1	6	12	13	−1	36	Qualification for the Europa League second qualifying round	0–1	1–3	1–2		0–0	5–0
5	Antwerp	10	2	3	5	10	18	−8	32	Qualification for the European competition play-off	0–4	2–3	1–1	1–3		0–1
6	Gent	10	1	0	9	4	32	−28	26		0–3	0–5	1–4	0–1	0–3	

Source: Jupiler Pro League (in Dutch), Soccerway
Rules for classification: 1) Points; 2) Points without (possible) half points added due to rounding; 3) Regular season finishing position.
(C) Champions

===== Results summary =====
Overall								Home						Away					
Pld	W	D	L	GF	GA	GD	Pts	W	D	L	GF	GA	GD	W	D	L	GF	GA	GD
10	9	1	0	22	3	+19	28	4	1	0	11	2	+9	5	0	0	11	1	+10

Last updated: complete.
Source: Competitions

===== Results by round =====
Round	1	2	3	4	5	6	7	8	9	10
Ground	H	A	H	A	A	H	H	A	A	H
Result	W	W	W	W	W	D	W	W	W	W
Position	3	3	3	3	1	1	1	1	1	1
Points	31	34	37	40	43	44	47	50	53	56

A = Away; H = Home; W = Win; D = Draw; L = Loss

===== Matches =====
Win Draw Loss Fixtures

29 March 2025 1	Union Saint-Gilloise	5–1	Antwerp	Brussels
20:45 CET	Khalaili 4', (yellow card) 34'; David 14'; Ivanović 45+3' (pen.), 87'; Niang (yellow card) 68'; Machida 71'	Report	Bozhinov (yellow card) 15' (yellow-red card) 45+1'; Kerk 37'; Deman (yellow card) 67'	Stadium: Joseph Marien Stadium

5 April 2025 2	Gent	0–3	Union Saint-Gilloise	Ghent
20:45 CEST	Lopes (yellow card) 56'	Report	Ait El Hadj 31'; Ivanović 33'; Daivd 39'; Burgess (yellow card) 80'	Stadium: Ghelamco Arena

12 April 2025 3	Union Saint-Gilloise	2–0	Anderlecht	Brussels
20:45 CEST	Niang (yellow card) 34'; Sadiki (yellow card) 37'; David 45'; Castro-Montes (yellow card) 60'; Khalili (yellow card) 62'; Ait El Hadj 82'	Report	Simić (yellow card) 55'; Huerta (yellow card) 63'; Vázquez (yellow card) 81'; De Cat (yellow card) 88'	Stadium: Joseph Marien Stadium

20 April 2025 4	Genk	1–2	Union Saint-Gilloise	Genk
16:00 CEST	El Ouahdi (yellow card) 40'; Tolu 90+3'	Report	Niang (yellow card) 10'; Van de Perre (yellow card) 16'; David 42' (pen.), 50'	Stadium: Cegeka Arena

24 April 2025 5	Club Brugge	0–1	Union Saint-Gilloise	Brugge
20:30 CEST	Onyedika (yellow card) 51'	Report	David (yellow card) 23'; Castro-Montes 34'; Fuseini (yellow card) 83'; Van de Perre (yellow card) 90'	Stadium: Jan Breydel Stadium

27 April 2025 6	Union Saint-Gilloise	0–0	Club Brugge	Brussels
18:30 CEST	Vanhoutte (yellow card) 51'; Ivanović (yellow card) 90+4'; Fuseini (yellow card) 90+4'	Report	Onyedika (yellow card) 38'; De Cuyper (yellow card) 43'; Ordóñez (yellow card) 90+4'	Stadium: Joseph Marien Stadium

3 May 2025 7	Union Saint-Gilloise	1–0	Genk	Brussels
20:45 CEST	Vanhoutte (yellow card) 41'; David (yellow card) 45+1'; Van de Perre (yellow card) 56'; Mac Allister (yellow card) 66'; Burgess 67', (yellow card) 71'	Report	Bangoura (yellow card) 43' (yellow-red card) 51'; El Ouahdi (yellow card) 90+2'; Heynen (yellow card) 90+5'	Stadium: Joseph Marien Stadium

10 May 2025 8	Anderlecht	0–1	Union Saint-Gilloise	Anderlecht
20:45 CEST	N'Diaye (yellow card) 57'; Degreef (yellow card) 82'	Report	Fuseini 27'; Burgess (yellow card) 33'; Mac Allister (yellow card) 37'; Sadiki (yellow card) 50'; Sykes (yellow card) 90+3'	Stadium: Lotto Park

17 May 2025 9	Antwerp	0–4	Union Saint-Gilloise	Antwerp
20:45 CEST	Kerk (yellow card) 29'		Fuseini 6', 35'; Ivanović 41' (pen.); Mac Allister (yellow card) 55'; David 83'	Stadium: Bosuilstadion

25 May 2025 10	Union Saint-Gilloise	3–1	Gent	Brussels
18:30 CEST	Ivanović 11'; David 68', 75', (yellow card) 69'; Machida (yellow card) 87'	Report	Guðjohnsen 45'	Stadium: Joseph Marien Stadium

=== Belgian Cup ===
Win Draw Loss Fixtures

30 October 2024 Seventh round	Eupen	0–3	Union Saint-Gilloise	Eupen
20:00 CET	Keita (yellow card) 79'	Report	François (yellow card) 15'; Burgess (yellow card) 48'; David 60' (pen.), 69'; Van de Perre (yellow card) 73'; Lapoussin (yellow card) 80'; Kabangu 83'	Stadium: Kehrwegstadion; Attendance: 1,574; Referee: Laurent Willems

4 December 2024 Eighth round	Union Saint-Gilloise	3–2	Gent	Brussels
20:00 CET	David 13', 58'; Lapoussin (yellow card) 41'; Fuseini 48'		Dean (yellow card) 43'; Mitrović (yellow card) 48'; Gandelman 62'; Kums (yellow card) 74'; Torunarigha (yellow card) 81'; Watanabe (yellow card) 82'; Gambor (yellow card) 90'; De Vlieger (yellow card) 90+1'	Stadium: Joseph Marien Stadium; Attendance: 6,621; Referee: Lawrence Visser

8 January 2025 Quarter-final	Antwerp	5–1	Union Saint-Gilloise	Antwerp
20:45 CET	Valencia (yellow card) 33'; Chery 40', 50' (pen.); Van Den Bosch (yellow card) 52'; Janssen 64'; Kerk 84'; Corbanie (yellow card) 87'; Praet 90+3'	Report	Vanhoutte (yellow card) 26'; Boufal (yellow card) 31'; Sykes (yellow card) 42'; Fuseini (yellow card) 52'; Sadiki 56'	Stadium: Bosuilstadion

=== Belgian Super Cup ===
Win Draw Loss Fixtures

20 July 2024	Club Brugge	1–2	Union Saint-Gilloise	Brugge
20:00 CEST	Romero (yellow card) 11'; Tzolis 79'	Report	Leysen (yellow card) 13', (goal) 47'; Puertas 40' (pen.); Vanhoutte (yellow card) 42'; Sadiki (yellow card) 49'; Moris (yellow card) 50'; Kabangu (yellow card) 58'; Terho (yellow card) 90'	Stadium: Jan Breydel Stadium

=== UEFA Champions League ===
Win Draw Loss Fixtures

==== Third qualifying round ====
7 August 2024 First leg	Slavia Prague (Czech Republic)	3–1	(Belgium) Union Saint-Gilloise	Prague, Czech Republic
19:00 CEST	Chorý 19', 41'; Dorley 57', (yellow card) 85'; Provod (yellow card) 68'	Report	Vanhoutte (yellow card) 43'; Puertas (yellow card) 53'; Bužek 72' (o.g.); Fuseini (red card) 85'; Moris (yellow card) 86'; Teklab (yellow card) 88'	Stadium: Fortuna Arena

13 August 2024 Second leg	Union Saint-Gilloise (Belgium)	0–1 (1–4 agg.)	(Czech Republic) Slavia Prague	Brussels, Belgium
	Vanhoutte (yellow card) 42'; David (yellow card) 78'	Report	Zima (yellow card) 15'; Diouf (yellow card) 63'; Jurečka 84'	Stadium: Anderlecht Stadium
Note: This game will played at Anderlecht's stadium due to Union's home stadium not meeting UEFA requirements and the clubs designated venue for European competitions the King Baudouin Stadium will not be ready in time to host this game.

=== UEFA Europa League ===
Win Draw Loss Fixtures

Due to their home venue, the Joseph Marien Stadium, not meeting UEFA requirements, Union Saint-Gilloise will play their home games at the King Baudouin Stadium.

==== League phase ====
Pos	Team	Pld	W	D	L	GF	GA	GD	Pts	Qualification
19	(Royal Dutch Football Association) AZ	8	3	2	3	13	13	0	11	Advance to knockout phase play-offs (unseeded)
20	(Danish Football Association) Midtjylland	8	3	2	3	9	9	0	11	Advance to knockout phase play-offs (unseeded)
21	(Royal Belgian Football Association) Union Saint-Gilloise	8	3	2	3	8	8	0	11	Advance to knockout phase play-offs (unseeded)
22	(Hellenic Football Federation) PAOK	8	3	1	4	12	10	+2	10	Advance to knockout phase play-offs (unseeded)
23	(Royal Dutch Football Association) Twente	8	2	4	2	8	9	−1	10	Advance to knockout phase play-offs (unseeded)

Source: UEFA
Rules for classification: League phase tiebreakers

26 September 2024 1	Fenerbahçe (Turkey)	2–1	(Belgium) Union Saint-Gilloise	Kadıköy, Turkey
18:45 CEST	Söyüncü 26'; Becão (yellow card) 33'; Müldür (yellow card) 55'; Burgess 82' (o.g.); Osayi-Samuel (yellow card) 87' (yellow-red card) 90'	Report	Mac Allister (red card) 73'; Boufal (yellow card) 80'; Sykes 90+3'; Vanhoutte (yellow card) 90+6'	Stadium: Şükrü Saracoğlu Stadium; Attendance: 31,760; Referee: Benoît Bastien (France)

3 October 2024 2	Union Saint-Gilloise (Belgium)	0–0	(Norway) Bodø/Glimt	Brussels, Belgium
21:00 CEST	Machida (yellow card) 51'; Niang (yellow card) 68'; Burgess (yellow card) 78'	Report	Bjørtuft (yellow card) 22'; Gundersen (yellow card) 90+1'	Stadium: King Baudouin Stadium; Attendance: 5,576; Referee: Ondřej Berka (Czech Republic)

24 October 2024 3	Midtjylland (Denmark)	1–0	(Belgium) Union Saint-Gilloise	Herning, Denmark
18:45 CEST	Diao 18'; Gorgorza (yellow card) 86'	Report	Khalali (yellow card) 23'; Niang (yellow card) 49'; Mac Allister (yellow card) 89'; Ivanović (yellow card) 90+2'; Burgess (yellow card) 90+4'	Stadium: MCH Arena; Attendance: 8,491; Referee: Sebastian Gishamer (Austria)

7 November 2024 4	Union Saint-Gilloise (Belgium)	1–1	(Italy) Roma	Brussels, Belgium
18:45 CET	Mac Allister 77'; Vanhoutte (yellow card) 89'; Sykes (yellow card) 90+2'	Report	Shomurodov (yellow card) 4'; Çelik (yellow card) 27'; Mancini 62'	Stadium: King Baudouin Stadium; Attendance: 13,875; Referee: Jérôme Brisard (France)

28 November 2024 5	Twente (Netherlands)	0–1	(Belgium) Union Saint-Gilloise	Enschede, Netherlands
21:00 CET	D. Rots (yellow card) 35'; Regeer (yellow card) 88'	Report	Fuseini 11'; Sykes (yellow card) 24'; Mac Allister (yellow card) 81'; Sadiki (yellow card) 90'; Khalaili (yellow card) 90+3'	Stadium: De Grolsch Veste; Attendance: 26,500; Referee: John Beaton (Scotland)
Note: Pocognoli (yellow card) 72'

12 December 2024 6	Union Saint-Gilloise (Belgium)	2–1	(France) Nice	Brussels, Belgium
18:45 CET	Ivanović 33', 90+2', (yellow card) 90+4'; Vanhoutte (yellow card) 75'; Mac Allister (yellow card) 76'; Kahlaili (yellow card) 89'	Report	Guessand 45+1'; Bombito (yellow card) 61'	Stadium: King Baudouin Stadium; Referee: Chris Kavanagh (England)

23 January 2025 7	Union Saint-Gilloise (Belgium)	2–1	(Portugal) Braga	Brussels, Belgium
21:00 CET	Burgess (yellow card) 45' (yellow-red card) FT; Ivanović 50', 74'; Machida (yellow card) 66' (yellow-red card) 82'; Rodríguez (yellow card) 73'; Sadiki (yellow card) 90'; Van de Perre (yellow card) 90+5'	Report	El Ouazzani 16'; Carvalho (yellow card) 73' (yellow-red card) 79'; Niakate (yellow card) 80'; Horta (yellow card) 80'; Gharbi (yellow card) 90'; Bruma (red card) FT	Stadium: King Baudouin Stadium
Note: After the conclusion of the game Christian Burgess was shown a second yellow card, while Bruma was shown a straight red card.

30 January 2025 8	Rangers (Scotland)	2–1	(Belgium) Union Saint-Gilloise	Glasgow, Scotland
21:00 CET	Raskin 20', (yellow card) 89'; Igamane (yellow card) 45+2'; Černý 55'; Diomande (yellow card) 83'; Pröpper (yellow card) 90+2'	Report	Leysen (yellow card) 52'; Mac Allister 83'; Sykes (yellow card) 90+6'	Stadium: Ibrox Stadium

==== Knockout phase ====
===== Play-offs =====
Union were drawn for the knockout phase play-offs as an unseeded team, as a result of their finishing position, and played Ajax over two legs in February 2025, going out of the competition 3–2 on aggregate.

13 February 2025 First leg	Union Saint-Gilloise (Belgium)	0–2	(Netherlands) Ajax	Brussels, Belgium
18:45 CET	Mac Allister (yellow card) 79'	Report	Rasmussen 59'; Mokio (yellow card) 62', (goal) 71'	Stadium: King Baudouin Stadium; Attendance: 10,853; Referee: Donatas Rumšas (Lithuania)

20 February 2025 Second leg	Ajax (Netherlands)	1–2 (a.e.t.) (3–2 agg.)	(Belgium) Union Saint-Gilloise	Amsterdam, Netherlands
21:00 CET	Klaassen (red card) 25'; Lucas Rosa (yellow card) 32'; Gaaei (yellow card) 59'; Henderson (yellow card) 62'; Kaplan (yellow card) 71'; Taylor 93' (pen.), (yellow card) 101'; Hato (yellow card) 120+5'	Report	Mac Allister 16', (yellow card) 99'; David 28' (pen.); Boufal (yellow card) 59'; Sadiki (yellow card) 73'; Khalaili (yellow card) 93'; Burgess (yellow card) 105'; Van de Perre (yellow card) 120+5'	Stadium: Johan Cruyff Arena; Referee: Chris Kavanagh (England)

== Statistics ==
=== Appearances and goals ===
Includes all competitive matches. The list is sorted by squad number. Players who left the club prior to the first competitive fixture of the season or who have not made any appearances are not featured.

No.	Pos	Nat	Player	Total		Belgian Pro League (Note: Includes games from regular season and playoffs)		Belgian Cup		European Competition (Note: UEFA Champions League qualifying rounds and UEFA Europa League games)		Super Cup	
No.	Pos	Nat	Player	Apps	Goals	Apps	Goals	Apps	Goals	Apps	Goals	Apps	Goals
Goalkeepers
49	GK	(Luxembourg) LUX	Anthony Moris	56	0	40+0	0	3+0	0	12+0	0	1+0	0
14	GK	(Belgium) BEL	Joachim Imbrechts	0	0	0+0	0	0+0	0	0+0	0	0+0	0
Defenders
5	DF	(Argentina) ARG	Kevin Mac Allister	46	5	32+3	2	0+0	0	10+0	3	1+0	0
16	DF	(England) ENG	Christian Burgess	42	1	30+0	1	3+0	0	9+0	0	0+0	0
19	DF	(Belgium) BEL	Guillaume François	4	0	1+2	0	1+0	0	0+0	0	0+0	0
26	DF	(England) ENG	Ross Sykes	34	3	13+10	2	2+1	0	5+3	1	0+0	0
28	DF	(Japan) JPN	Koki Machida	48	1	31+3	1	2+1	0	9+1	0	1+0	0
48	DF	(Belgium) BEL	Fedde Leysen	36	1	18+10	0	1+0	0	4+2	0	1+0	1
85	DF	(Belgium) BEL	Arnaud Dony	0	0	0+0	0	0+0	0	0+0	0	0+0	0
Midfielders
4	MF	(Norway) NOR	Mathias Rasmussen	36	1	11+13	1	0+1	0	4+6	0	0+1	0
6	MF	(Belgium) BEL	Kamiel Van de Perre	29	0	10+13	0	1+0	0	2+3	0	0+0	0
10	MF	(Belgium) BEL	Anouar Ait El Hadj	39	5	17+11	5	1+1	0	3+6	0	0+0	0
21	MF	(Belgium) BEL	Alessio Castro-Montes	29	2	13+10	2	1+0	0	4+0	0	1+0	0
22	MF	(Morocco) MAR	Sofiane Boufal	25	0	9+9	0	2+0	0	3+2	0	0+0	0
23	MF	(Senegal) SEN	Ousseynou Niang	39	2	21+6	2	1+1	0	10+0	0	0+0	0
24	MF	(Belgium) BEL	Charles Vanhoutte	46	1	30+3	1	2+0	0	10+0	0	1+0	0
27	MF	(Democratic Republic of the Congo) COD	Noah Sadiki	55	2	37+2	1	3+0	1	12+0	0	1+0	0
Forwards
9	FW	(Croatia) CRO	Franjo Ivanović	46	20	32+2	16	1+1	0	9+1	4	0+0	0
11	FW	(Germany) GER	Henok Teklab	9	0	3+3	0	0+0	0	2+0	0	1+0	0
12	FW	(Canada) CAN	Promise David	41	24	23+11	19	3+0	4	3+0	1	0+1	0
13	FW	(Ecuador) ECU	Kevin Rodríguez	36	1	5+17	1	1+1	0	5+7	0	0+0	0
20	FW	(Switzerland) SUI	Marc Giger	3	0	0+3	0	0+0	0	0+0	0	0+0	0
25	FW	(Israel) ISR	Anan Khalaily	47	2	26+8	2	2+1	0	7+2	0	0+1	0
31	FW	(Spain) ESP	Cristian Makaté	1	0	0+0	0	0+1	0	0+0	0	0+0	0
77	FW	(Ghana) GHA	Mohammed Fuseini	43	11	17+15	9	1+1	1	6+3	1	0+0	0
Players who have made appearances this season but have since left the squad
7	FW	(Belgium) BEL	Elton Kabangu	13	1	1+6	0	0+1	1	0+4	0	1+0	0
8	MF	(Ivory Coast) CIV	Lazare Amani	12	0	5+6	0	0+0	0	0+0	0	0+1	0
9	FW	(Germany) GER	Dennis Eckert	6	1	3+0	1	0+0	0	1+1	0	1+0	0
15	MF	(Mali) MLI	Mamadou Traoré	1	0	0+1	0	0+0	0	0+0	0	0+0	0
17	FW	(Finland) FIN	Casper Terho	11	0	4+5	0	0+0	0	0+1	0	0+1	0
23	MF	(Spain) ESP	Cameron Puertas	6	2	2+1	1	0+0	0	2+0	0	1+0	1
94	MF	(Madagascar) MAD	Loïc Lapoussin	9	1	6+0	1	1+2	0	0+0	0	0+0	0

=== Goalscorers ===
Includes all competitive matches. The list is sorted by squad number when total goals are equal. Players with no goals not included in the list.

Rank	No.	Pos.	Nat.	Name	Belgian Pro League (Note: Includes regular season and play-off games)	Belgian Cup	European Competition	Other (Note: Belgian Super Cup)	Total
1	12	FW	(Canada)	Promise David	19	4	1	0	24
2	9	FW	(Croatia)	Franjo Ivanović	16	0	4	0	20
3	77	FW	(Ghana)	Mohammed Fuseini	9	1	1	0	11
4	5	DF	(Argentina)	Kevin Mac Allister	2	0	3	0	5
4	10	MF	(Belgium)	Anouar Ait El Hadj	5	0	0	0	5
5	26	DF	(England)	Ross Sykes	2	0	1	0	3
6	21	MF	(Belgium)	Alessio Castro-Montes	2	0	0	0	2
6	22	MF	(Senegal)	Ousseynou Niang	2	0	0	0	2
6	23	MF	(Spain)	Cameron Puertas	1	0	0	1	2
6	25	FW	(Israel)	Anan Khalaily	2	0	0	0	2
6	27	MF	(Democratic Republic of the Congo)	Noah Sadiki	1	1	0	0	2
7	4	MF	(Norway)	Mathias Rasmussen	1	0	0	0	1
7	7	FW	(Belgium)	Elton Kabangu	0	1	0	0	1
7	9	FW	(Germany)	Dennis Eckert	1	0	0	0	1
7	13	FW	(Ecuador)	Kevin Rodríguez	1	0	0	0	1
7	16	DF	(England)	Christian Burgess	1	0	0	0	1
7	24	MF	(Belgium)	Charles Vanhoutte	1	0	0	0	1
7	28	DF	(Japan)	Koki Machida	1	0	0	0	1
7	48	DF	(Belgium)	Fedde Leysen	0	0	0	1	1
7	94	MF	(Madagascar)	Loïc Lapoussin	1	0	0	0	1
Own goal					3	0	1	0	4
Total					72	7	11	2	91

=== Assists ===
Includes all competitive matches. The list is sorted by squad number when total assists are equal. Players with no assists are not included in the list.

Rank	No.	Pos.	Nat.	Name	Belgian Pro League (Note: Includes regular season and play-off games)	Belgian Cup	European Competition	Other (Note: Belgian Super Cup)	Total
1	24	MF	(Belgium)	Charles Vanhoutte	7	0	2	0	9
2	10	MF	(Belgium)	Anouar Ait El Hadj	7	0	1	0	8
3	9	FW	(Croatia)	Franjo Ivanović	5	0	0	0	5
3	12	MF	(Canada)	Promise David	5	0	0	0	5
3	21	MF	(Belgium)	Alessio Castro-Montes	5	0	0	0	5
4	23	MF	(Morocco)	Sofiane Boufal	3	0	1	0	4
4	25	FW	(Israel)	Anan Khalaily	4	0	0	0	4
5	4	MF	(Norway)	Mathias Rasmussen	3	0	0	0	3
5	22	MF	(Senegal)	Ousseynou Niang	1	0	2	0	3
5	27	MF	(Democratic Republic of the Congo)	Noah Sadiki	3	0	0	0	3
5	77	FW	(Ghana)	Mohammed Fuseini	1	2	0	0	3
6	16	DF	(England)	Christian Burgess	2	0	0	0	2
7	11	MF	(Germany)	Henok Teklab	1	0	0	0	1
7	13	FW	(Ecuador)	Kevin Rodríguez	0	0	1	0	1
7	17	MF	(Finland)	Casper Terho	1	0	0	0	1
7	26	DF	(England)	Ross Sykes	1	0	0	0	1
7	94	MF	(Madagascar)	Loïc Lapoussin	1	0	0	0	1
Total					50	2	7	0	59

=== Disciplinary record ===
Includes all competitions for senior teams. The list is sorted by red cards, then yellow cards (and by squad number when total cards are equal). Players with no cards not included in the list.

Rank	No.	Pos.	Nat.	Name	Belgian Pro League			Belgian Cup			European Competition (Note: UEFA Champions League qualifying rounds and UEFA Europa League games)			Other (Note: Belgian Super Cup)			Total		
Rank	No.	Pos.	Nat.	Name	Booked	(yellow card) (yellow-red card)	Sent off (straight red)	Booked	(yellow card) (yellow-red card)	Sent off (straight red)	Booked	(yellow card) (yellow-red card)	Sent off (straight red)	Booked	(yellow card) (yellow-red card)	Sent off (straight red)	Booked	(yellow card) (yellow-red card)	Sent off (straight red)
1	5	DF	(Argentina)	Kevin Mac Allister	11	1	0	0	0	0	5	0	1	0	0	0	16	1	1
2	28	DF	(Japan)	Koki Machida	2	1	0	0	0	0	2	1	0	0	0	0	4	2	0
3	16	DF	(England)	Christian Burgess	11	0	0	1	0	0	4	1	0	0	0	0	16	1	0
4	24	MF	(Belgium)	Charles Vanhoutte	4	0	1	1	0	0	5	0	0	1	0	0	11	0	1
5	77	FW	(Ghana)	Mohammed Fuseini	5	0	0	1	0	0	1	0	1	0	0	0	7	0	1
6	12	FW	(Canada)	Promise David	9	0	0	0	0	0	1	0	0	0	0	0	10	0	0
6	22	MF	(Senegal)	Ousseynou Niang	8	0	0	0	0	0	2	0	0	0	0	0	10	0	0
6	25	FW	(Israel)	Anan Khalaily	6	0	0	0	0	0	4	0	0	0	0	0	10	0	0
6	27	DF	(Democratic Republic of the Congo)	Noah Sadiki	6	0	0	0	0	0	3	0	0	1	0	0	10	0	0
7	26	DF	(England)	Ross Sykes	5	0	0	1	0	0	3	0	0	0	0	0	9	0	0
8	6	MF	(Belgium)	Kamiel Van de Perre	4	0	0	1	0	0	2	0	0	0	0	0	7	0	0
8	23	MF	(Morocco)	Sofiane Boufal	4	0	0	1	0	0	2	0	0	0	0	0	7	0	0
9	48	DF	(Belgium)	Fedde Leysen	4	0	0	0	0	0	1	0	0	1	0	0	6	0	0
10	9	FW	(Croatia)	Franjo Ivanović	3	0	0	0	0	0	2	0	0	0	0	0	5	0	0
11	49	GK	(Luxembourg)	Anthony Moris	2	0	0	0	0	0	1	0	0	1	0	0	4	0	0
12	21	MF	(Belgium)	Alessio Castro-Montes	3	0	0	0	0	0	0	0	0	0	0	0	3	0	0
12	94	MF	(Madagascar)	Loïc Lapoussin	1	0	0	2	0	0	0	0	0	0	0	0	3	0	0
13	8	FW	(Ivory Coast)	Lazare Amani	2	0	0	0	0	0	0	0	0	0	0	0	2	0	0
13	17	FW	(Finland)	Casper Terho	1	0	0	0	0	0	0	0	0	1	0	0	2	0	0
13	23	MF	(Spain)	Cameron Puertas	1	0	0	0	0	0	1	0	0	0	0	0	2	0	0
14	4	DF	(Norway)	Mathias Rasmussen	1	0	0	0	0	0	0	0	0	0	0	0	1	0	0
14	7	FW	(Belgium)	Elton Kabangu	0	0	0	0	0	0	0	0	0	1	0	0	1	0	0
14	10	MF	(Belgium)	Anouar Ait El Hadj	1	0	0	0	0	0	0	0	0	0	0	0	1	0	0
14	11	MF	(Germany)	Henok Teklab	0	0	0	0	0	0	1	0	0	0	0	0	1	0	0
14	13	MF	(Ecuador)	Kevin Rodríguez	0	0	0	0	0	0	1	0	0	0	0	0	1	0	0
14	19	DF	(Belgium)	Guillaume François	0	0	0	1	0	0	0	0	0	0	0	0	1	0	0
Total					94	2	1	9	0	0	41	2	2	6	0	0	150	4	3

=== Clean sheets ===
Includes all competitive matches. The list is sorted by squad number when total clean sheets are equal. Numbers in parentheses represent games where both goalkeepers participated and both kept a clean sheet; the number in parentheses is awarded to the goalkeeper who was substituted on, whilst a full clean sheet is awarded to the goalkeeper who was on the field at the start of play. Players with no clean sheets not included in the list.

Rank	No.	Nat.	Name	Belgian Pro League (Note: Include regular season and play-off games)	Belgian Cup	European Competition	Total
1	49	(Luxembourg)	Anthony Moris	20	1	2	23
Totals				20	1	2	23

=== Attendances ===
As of 11 January 2025

Biggest home attendance: 8,610 vs. Club Brugge (Joseph Marien Stadium); 13,875 vs. AS Roma (King Baudouin Stadium) (Note: This game was not played at the teams usual home stadium due to it not meeting UEFA requirements)
Smallest home attendance: 5,735 vs. Kortrijk (Joseph Marien Stadium); 5,499 vs. Slavia Prague (Lotto Park) (Note: This game was not played at the teams usual home stadium due to it not meeting UEFA requirements)
Biggest away attendance: 31,760 vs. Fenerbahce
Smallest away attendance: 3,500 vs. Dender
