= Noah Sadiki =

DR Congolese footballer (born 2004)

- Sadiki with Sunderland in 2026

Personal information
- Full name: Noah Junior Sadiki
- Date of birth: 17 December 2004 (age 21)
- Place of birth: Brussels, Belgium
- Height: 1.73 m (5 ft 8 in)
- Position: Defensive midfielder

Team information
- Current team: Sunderland
- Number: 27

Youth career
- 2011–2022: Anderlecht

Senior career*
Years	Team	Apps	(Gls)
2022–2023	Anderlecht	13	(0)
2022–2023	RSCA Futures	14	(0)
2023–2025	Union Saint-Gilloise	76	(1)
2025–	Sunderland	42	(0)

International career^{‡}
2019	Belgium U16	2	(0)
2022	Belgium U18	3	(0)
2022–2023	Belgium U19	5	(1)
2022	Belgium U20	2	(0)
2023–	DR Congo U21	4	(0)
2024–	DR Congo	26	(0)
- * Club domestic league appearances and goals as of 31 October 2026 ‡ National team caps and goals as of 28 September 2026

Noah Junior Sadiki (born 17 December 2004) is a professional footballer who plays as a central midfielder for the Premier League club Sunderland and the DR Congo national team.

== Club career ==
=== Anderlecht ===
Born in Brussels, Sadiki first joined R.S.C. Anderlecht at the age of six at under-7 level and progressed through all of the junior teams up to under-21 level. He impressed for Robin Veldman's under-21 team and caught the eye of first team manager Vincent Kompany who played him in two friendly matches in October 2021 and January 2022. He signed his first professional contract in February 2022 on a one-year deal, with the option of a further year.

=== Union SG ===
On 27 July 2023, Sadiki left Anderlecht and joined Union SG on a four-year contract, for a reported fee of €1.4 million.

=== Sunderland ===
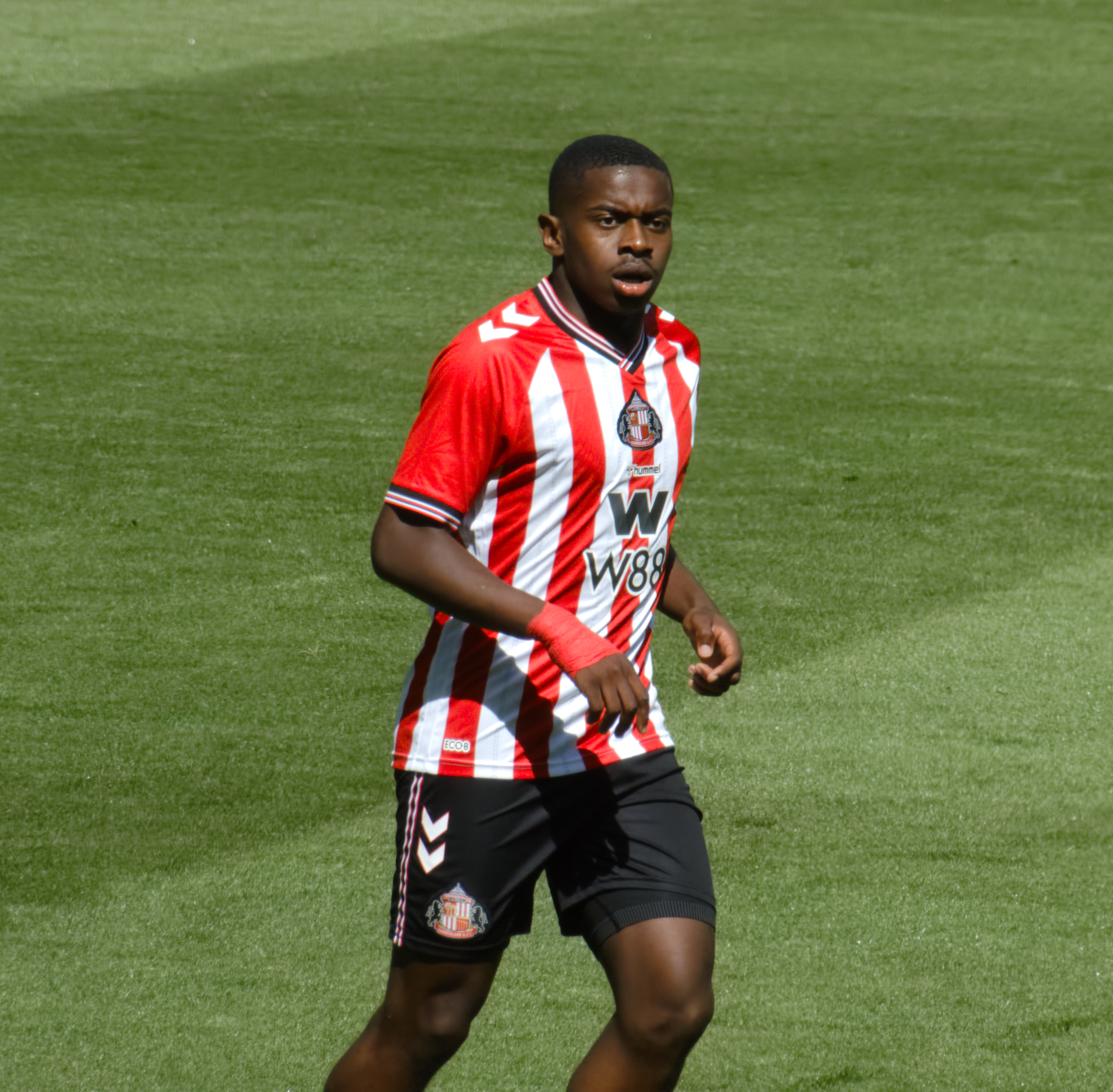
Sadiki with Sunderland in 2025

On 4 July 2025, Sadiki left Union SG and joined Premier League club Sunderland on a five-year contract, for an undisclosed fee.

Sadiki scored his first goal for Sunderland on 15 October 2026 in the UEFA Europa League fixture against SCU Torreense to secure a 2-1 win in the third minute of stoppage time.

== International career ==
Born in Belgium, Sadiki is of DR Congolese descent. Sadiki also holds both Congolese and Belgian citizenship from his parents. He is a youth international for Belgium having played up to the Belgium U20s, but opted to play for the DR Congo in September 2023. In September 2023 he was called up to play for the DR Congo U21s to play in their friendly matches against SK Lommel and Sparta Rotterdam. He played his first minutes in a 3–2 loss to Sparta Rotterdam. In October 2023, Sadiki was called up to the DR Congo U21s to play in a two match series against Tunisia U21s.

Sadiki made his debut for the senior DR Congo national team on 6 September 2024 in a Africa Cup of Nations qualifier against Guinea at the Stade des Martyrs.

On May 19, 2026, he was included in the 26-man squad selected by head coach Sébastien Desabre to represent the DR Congo at the 2026 FIFA World Cup. A month later, on 27 June, he became the youngest Congolese player to start a World Cup match, aged 21 years and 192 days old, in a 3–1 victory over Uzbekistan.

== Career statistics ==
=== Club ===
As of match played 31 October 2026

Appearances and goals by club, season and competition
Club	Season	League			National cup (Note: Includes Belgian Cup, FA Cup)		League cup		Europe		Other		Total	
Club	Season	Division	Apps	Goals	Apps	Goals	Apps	Goals	Apps	Goals	Apps	Goals	Apps	Goals
Anderlecht	2021–22	Belgian First Division A	1	0	0	0	—		0	0	—		1	0
Anderlecht	2022–23	Belgian Pro League	12	0	1	0	—		5 (Note: Appearances in UEFA Europa Conference League)	0	—		18	0
Anderlecht	Total		13	0	1	0	—		5	0	—		19	0
RSCA Futures	2022–23	Challenger Pro League	14	0	—		—		—		—		14	0
Union SG	2023–24	Belgian Pro League	37	0	5	0	—		11 (Note: Eight appearances in UEFA Europa League, three appearances in UEFA Europa Conference League)	0	—		53	0
Union SG	2024–25	Belgian Pro League	39	1	3	1	—		12 (Note: Two appearances in UEFA Champions League, ten appearances in UEFA Europa League)	0	1 (Note: Appearance in Belgian Super Cup)	0	55	2
Union SG	Total		76	1	8	1	—		23	0	1	0	108	2
Sunderland	2025–26	Premier League	33	0	2	0	0	0	—		—		35	0
Sunderland	2026–27	Premier League	9	0	0	0	0	0	3 (Note: Appearances in UEFA Europa League)	1	—		12	1
Sunderland	Total		42	0	2	0	0	0	3	1	—		47	1
Career total			145	1	11	1	0	0	31	1	1	0	188	3

=== International ===
As of match played 2 October 2026

Appearances and goals by national team and year
National team	Year	Apps	Goals
DR Congo	2024	6	0
DR Congo	2025	11	0
DR Congo	2026	9	0
Total		26	0

== Honours ==
Union SG

- Belgian Pro League: 2024–25
- Belgian Cup: 2023–24
- Belgian Super Cup: 2024
