= Mohammed Fuseini =

Ghanaian footballer

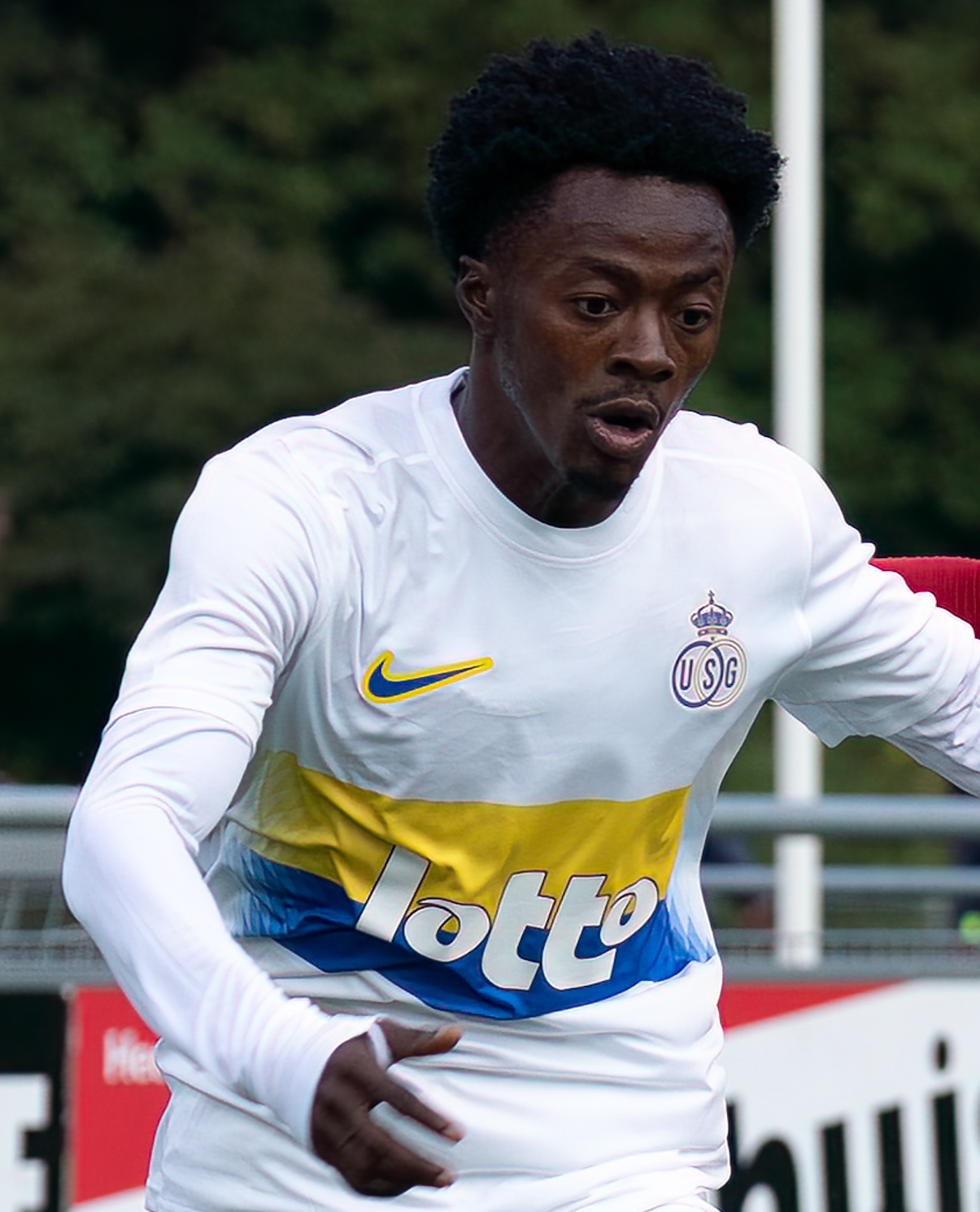
- Fuseini in 2024 with Union Saint-Gilloise

Personal information
- Full name: Mohammed Gadafi Fuseini
- Date of birth: 16 May 2002 (age 24)
- Place of birth: Tamale, Ghana
- Height: 1.69 m (5 ft 7 in)
- Position: Winger

Team information
- Current team: Derby County (on loan from Union Saint-Gilloise)
- Number: 16

Youth career
- Right to Dream Academy

Senior career*
Years	Team	Apps	(Gls)
2021–2023	Sturm Graz II	37	(11)
2022–2024	Sturm Graz	18	(3)
2024	→ Randers (loan)	16	(9)
2024–	Union Saint-Gilloise	56	(10)
2026–	→ Derby County (loan)	10	(1)

International career^{‡}
2025–	Ghana	2	(1)
- * Club domestic league appearances and goals as of 22:20, 6 November 2026 (UTC) ‡ National team caps and goals as of 14:22, 31 May 2025 (UTC)

Mohammed Gadafi Fuseini (born 16 May 2002) is a Ghanaian professional footballer who plays as a winger for EFL Championship club Derby County, on loan from Belgian club Union Saint-Gilloise and the Ghana national team.

After starting his career at the Right to Dream Academy, Fuseini moved to Europe to sign with Austrian club Sturm Graz in 2022, with a loan spell in Denmark with Randers in 2024, also in 2024 he would leave Austria and join Belgiian club Union SG. In 2026, he would move to England and sign with Derby County, on loan with an option to make the move permanent.

== Early life ==
Mohammed Fuseini was born and raised in Aboabo, a suburb of Tamale, Northern Region of Ghana. He attended basic school at Evangelical Presbyterian School (EP) Tamale.

== Club career ==
=== Sturm Graz ===
Fuseini, he moved from the Ghanaian club Right to Dream Academy to Austria to join Sturm Graz in February 2022, where he joined the reserves side. In his first season he made 14 appearances in the Regionalliga Mitte for Sturm II at end of the 2021–22 season. At the end of the season, Sturm Graz II were crowned champions in the second division.

Ahead of the 2022–23 season, he was promoted to the senior squad. In July 2022, however, he made his first match of the season in the second division when he was named in the starting eleven against Horn on the first day of that season. Even though Sturm II lost by 2–1, Fuseini scored Grazer's goal.

He made his first team debut in the UEFA Champions League in a 2–1 home loss to Dynamo Kyiv, coming on in the 102 minute of extra time for Jon Gorenc Stanković.

On 13 August 2022, he scored his second goal of the season, in Sturm Graz II 5–2 victory over SKN St. Pölten in the Austrian 2. Liga.

On 29 November 2022, Fuseini extended his contract with Sturm Graz until 2026.

On 28 January 2024, Fuseini joined Randers in Denmark on loan with an option to buy. After a loan spell in Randers, where he scored nine goals and made one assist in 16 games, Randers made a persistent attempt to buy Fuseini, but without success. Therefore, Fuseini returned to Sturm Graz, who had received a lot of interest from foreign clubs after Fuseini's good season in Randers.

While away, Sturm Graz won the Austrian Bundesliga title. Fuseini picked up a league winners' medal for playing 11 Bundesliga games.

=== Union SG ===
Fuseini joined Belgian Pro League club Union Saint-Gilloise on a permanent three-year deal in July 2024, contributing nine league goals as a regular starter and substitute as Union claimed their first league title since 1935.

On 1 September 2026, Fuseini joined EFL Championship club Derby County on loan with an option to buy in the summer of 2027. Fuseni made his Derby County debut on 5 September 2026, in a 3–0 defeat at West Ham United. Fuseini scored his first Derby County goal on 19 September, scoring 90th+3 minute equaliser in a 1–1 draw at Burnley.

== International career ==
He debuted and scored his first goal for Ghana on 31 May 2025 during the 2025 Unity Cup third-place playoff, which Ghana won 4–0 against Trinidad and Tobago.

== Career statistics ==
=== Club ===
As of match played 6 November 2026

Club	Season	League			National cup (Note: Includes Austrian Cup, Danish Cup, Belgian Cup, FA Cup)		Europe		Other		Total	
Club	Season	Division	Apps	Goals	Apps	Goals	Apps	Goals	Apps	Goals	Apps	Goals
Sturm Graz II	2021–22	Austrian Regionalliga	14	3	—		—		—		14	3
Sturm Graz II	2022–23	Austrian Football Second League	20	8	—		—		—		20	8
Sturm Graz II	2023–24	Austrian Football Second League	3	0	—		—		—		3	0
Sturm Graz II	Total		37	11	—		—		—		37	11
Sturm Graz	2022–23	Austrian Football Bundesliga	7	2	2	0	3	0	—		12	2
Sturm Graz	2023–24	Austrian Football Bundesliga	11	1	1	0	2	0	—		14	1
Sturm Graz	Total		18	3	3	0	5	0	0	0	26	3
Randers (loan)	2023–24	Danish Superliga	16	9	—		—		—		16	9
Union Saint-Gilloise	2024–25	Belgian Pro League	33	9	2	1	9 (Note: One appearance in UEFA Champions League, eight appearances and one goal in UEFA Europa League)	1	0	0	44	11
Union Saint-Gilloise	2025–26	Belgian Pro League	21	1	4	2	2 (Note: Appearances in UEFA Champions League)	0	0	0	27	3
Union Saint-Gilloise	2026–27	Belgian Pro League	2	0	0	0	2 (Note: Two appearances and one goal in UEFA Champions League)	1	1 (Note: Appearance in Belgian Super Cup)	0	5	1
Union Saint-Gilloise	Total		56	10	6	3	13	2	1	0	76	15
Derby County (loan)	2026–27	EFL Championship	10	1	0	0	—		—		10	1
Career total			136	34	9	3	18	2	1	0	165	39

=== International ===
As of match played 31 May 2025

Appearances and goals by national team and year
National team	Year	Apps	Goals
Ghana	2025	2	1
Total		2	1

Ghana score listed first, score column indicates score after each Fuseini goal.

List of international goals scored by Mohammed Fuseini
No.	Date	Venue	Cap	Opponent	Score	Result	Competition	Ref.
1	31 May 2025	Brentford Community Stadium, London, England	1	Trinidad and Tobago	3–0	4–0	2025 Unity Cup	

== Honours ==
Sturm Graz II

- Austrian Regionalliga Central: 2021–22

Sturm Graz

- Austrian Bundesliga: 2023–24
- Austrian Cup: 2022–23

Union Saint-Gilloise

- Belgian Pro League: 2024–25
- Belgian Cup: 2025–26
