= Amine Et-Taïbi =

Moroccan footballer (born 2003)

Personal information
- Date of birth: 5 February 2003 (age 23)
- Place of birth: Belgium
- Height: 1.86 m (6 ft 1 in)
- Position: Centre-back

Team information
- Current team: Willem II
- Number: 15

Youth career
- 2014–2016: Mechelen
- 2016–2022: Genk

Senior career*
Years	Team	Apps	(Gls)
2022–2023	Jong Genk	12	(0)
2023–2025	Club NXT	45	(3)
2024–2025	Club Brugge	0	(0)
2025–2026	Mechelen	0	(0)
2025–2026	→ Helmond Sport (loan)	19	(1)
2026–	Willem II	8	(0)

International career^{‡}
2018	Belgium U15	6	(0)
2018	Belgium U16	2	(0)
2019–2020	Belgium U17	8	(0)
2021	Belgium U19	4	(0)
2023	Morocco U20	3	(0)
2023–	Morocco U23	2	(0)
- * Club domestic league appearances and goals as of 28 April 2026 ‡ National team caps and goals as of 02:49, 22 July 2024 (UTC)

Amine Et-Taïbi (Arabic: أمين الطيبي; born 5 February 2003) is a professional footballer who plays as a centre-back for Eredivisie club Willem II. Born in Belgium, he is a youth international for Morocco.

== Club career ==
Et-Taïbi is a youth product of Mechelen and Genk, and signed his first professional contract with Genk on 6 December 2018. On 28 July 2021, he signed a second contract with Genk until 2024. He debuted with their reserves, Jong Genk, in August 2022.

On 19 July 2023, Et-Taïbi transferred to Club NXT on a two-year contract. He made his senior debut with Club Brugge at the 2024 Belgian Super Cup on 20 July 2024, a 2–1 loss to Union Saint-Gilloise.

On 5 August 2025, Et-Taïbi signed a two-year contract with Mechelen and was immediately loaned to Helmond Sport in the Netherlands for the 2025–26 season.

On 21 January 2026, Et-Taïbi moved to Willem II on a two-and-a-half-year deal.

== International career ==
Et-Taïbi was born in Belgium, and is of Moroccan descent. From 2018 to 2021, he represented Belgium from U15 to U19 levels. In June 2023, he was called up to the Morocco U20s for the 2023 Maurice Revello Tournament. In March 2023, he was called up to the Morocco U23s for a set of 2024 Summer Olympics qualification matches.
