= Daniel Tshilanda =

DR Congolese footballer (born 2006)

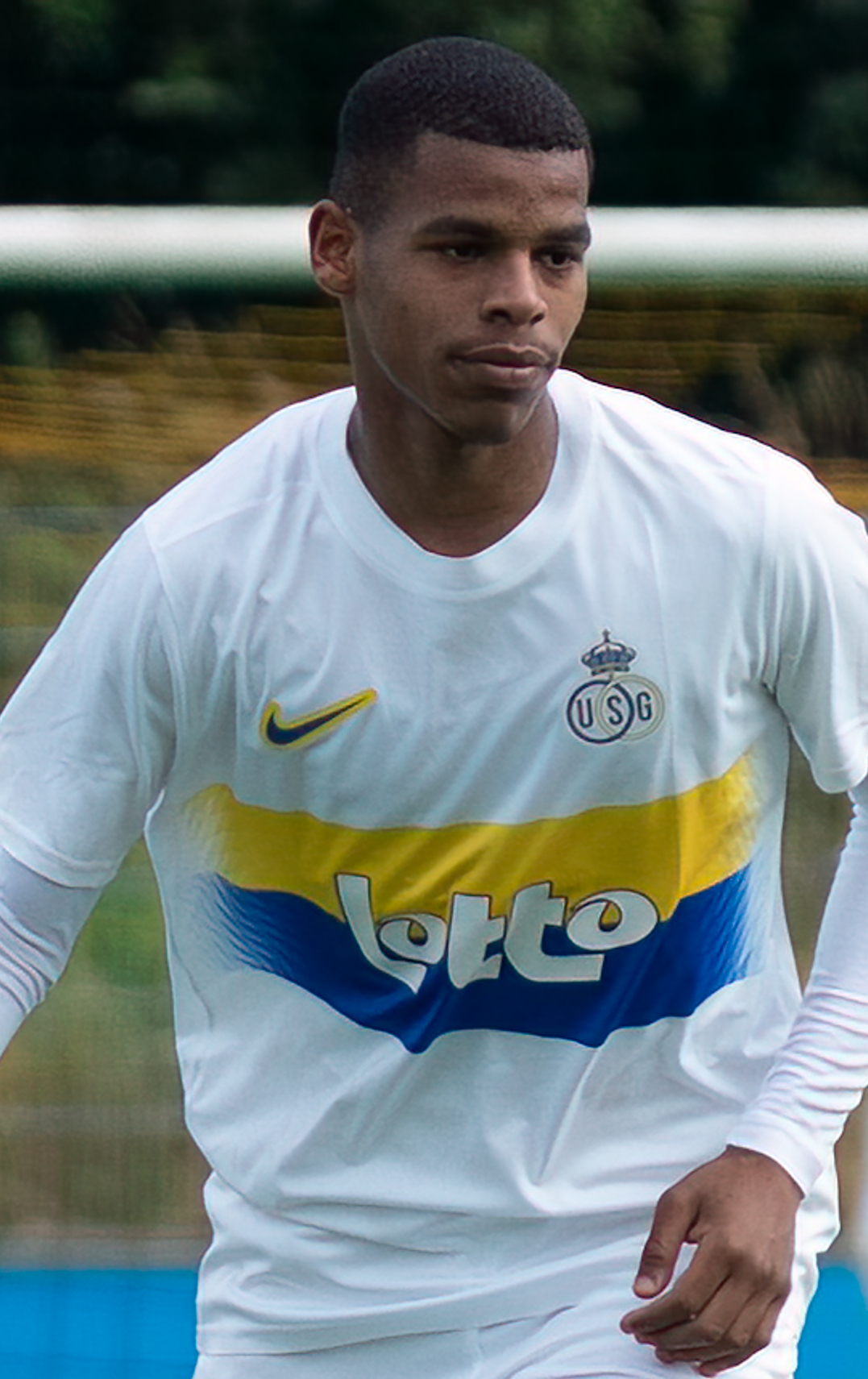
- Tshilanda in 2024

Personal information
- Full name: Daniel Mpoyi Tshilanda Kabongo
- Date of birth: 27 April 2006 (age 20)
- Place of birth: Belgium
- Position: Centre-back

Team information
- Current team: Union Saint-Gilloise U23
- Number: 43

Youth career
- Union Saint-Gilloise

Senior career*
Years	Team	Apps	(Gls)
2023–2025	Union Saint-Gilloise U23	40	(0)
2024–2025	Union Saint-Gilloise	0	(0)
2025–2026	Sporting Hasselt	1	(0)
2026–	Union Saint-Gilloise U23	6	(0)

International career^{‡}
2024	Belgium U18	2	(0)
2025–	DR Congo U20	4	(0)
2026–	DR Congo U23	4	(0)
- * Club domestic league appearances and goals as of 08:53, 25 October 2026 (UTC) ‡ National team caps and goals as of 08:53, 17 September 2026 (UTC)

Daniel Mpoyi Tshilanda Kabongo (born 27 April 2006) is a professional footballer who plays as a centre-back for Belgian Division 1 club Union Saint-Gilloise U23. Born in Belgium, he is a youth international for the DR Congo.

== Club career ==
On 15 August 2023, he signed his first professional contract with Union Saint-Gilloise until 2024 and was promoted to their reserve team. In January 2024, he was called up to a training camp with the senior team over the winter break. He debuted with the senior team as a late substitute in a 1–0 UEFA Conference League win over Fenerbahçe on 14 March 2024. He was a substitute for Union Saint-Gilloise for the 2024 Belgian Super Cup on 20 July 2024, as his club won the trophy in a 2–1 win over Club Brugge.

== International career ==
Tshilanda was born in Belgium, and is of Congolese and Macedonian descent. He is a youth international for Belgium, having played for the Belgium U18s in 2024. In April 2025, he opted to play for the DR Congo U20s at the 2025 U-20 Africa Cup of Nations.

== Career statistics ==
As of match played 22 October 2026

Appearances and goals by club, season and competition
Club	Season	League			National cup		Europe		Other		Total	
Club	Season	Division	Apps	Goals	Apps	Goals	Apps	Goals	Apps	Goals	Apps	Goals
Union Saint-Gilloise U23	2023–24	Belgian Division 2	27	0	—		—		—		27	0
Union Saint-Gilloise U23	2024–25	Belgian Division 1	13	0	—		—		4 (Note: Appearances in play-offs)	0	17	0
Union Saint-Gilloise U23	Total		40	0	—		—		4	0	44	0
Union Saint-Gilloise	2023–24	Belgian Pro League	0	0	0	0	1 (Note: Appearance in UEFA Conference League)	0	—		1	0
Sporting Hasselt	2025–26	Belgian Division 1	1	0	—		—		—		1	0
Union Saint-Gilloise U23	2026–27	Belgian Division 1	6	0	—		—		—		6	0
Union Saint-Gilloise	2026–27	Belgian Pro League	0	0	0	0	1 (Note: Appearances in UEFA Europa League)	0	—		1	0
Career total			47	0	0	0	2	0	4	0	53	0

== Honours ==
Union Saint-Gilloise

- Belgian Super Cup: 2024
