= Mamadou Thierno Barry =

Senegalese footballer (born 2005)

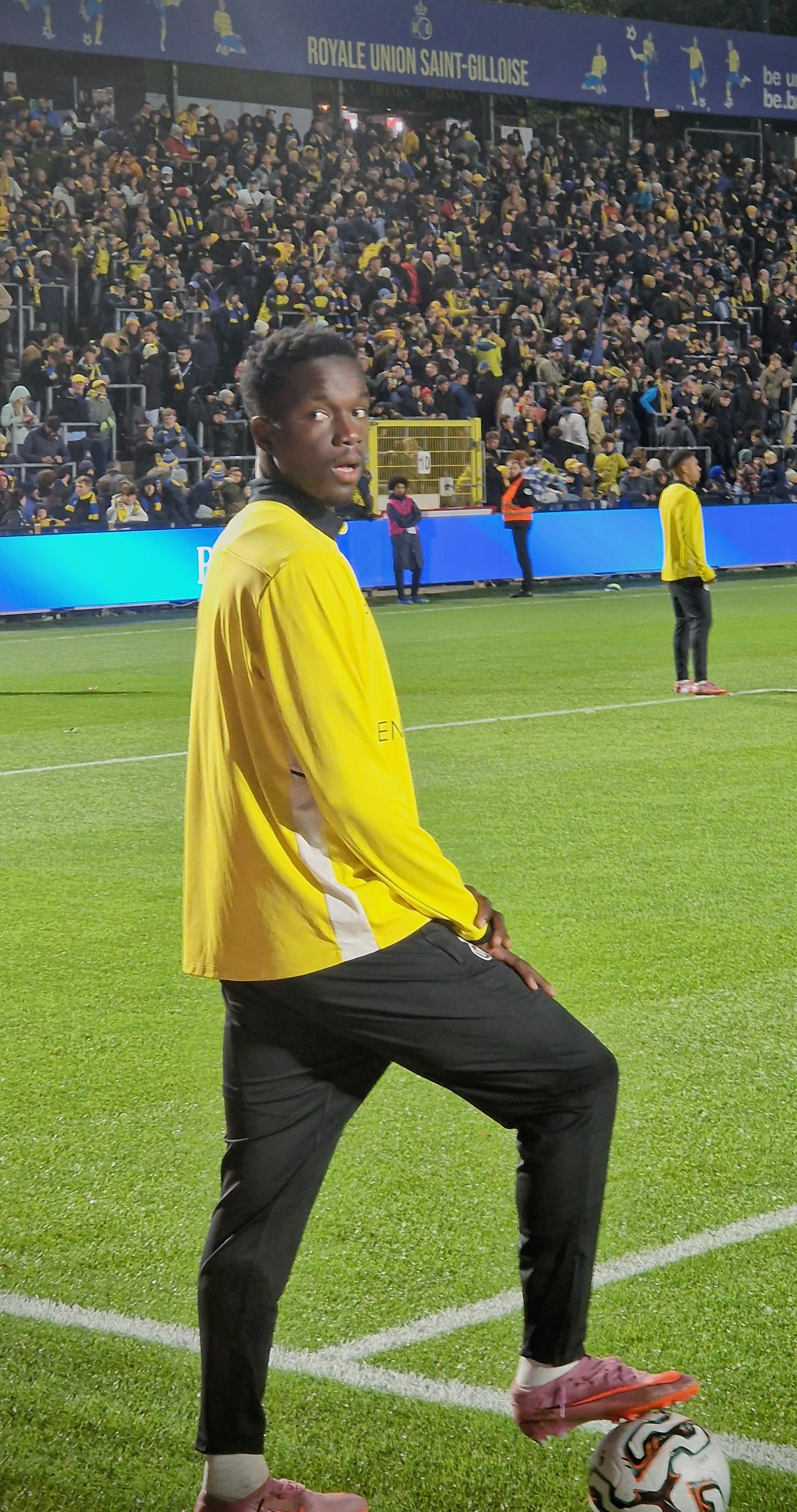
- Barry with Union Saint-Gilloise in 2025

Personal information
- Date of birth: 20 March 2005 (age 21)
- Place of birth: Senegal
- Height: 1.95 m (6 ft 5 in)
- Position: Centre-back

Team information
- Current team: Al Shabab
- Number: 3

Youth career
- –2024: Mawade Wade

Senior career*
Years	Team	Apps	(Gls)
2024	Tromsø 2	3	(2)
2024–2025	Tromsø	15	(1)
2025–	Union Saint-Gilloise	2	(0)
2026–	→ Al-Shabab (loan)	9	(0)
- * Club domestic league appearances and goals as of 19 October 2026

Mamadou Thierno Barry (born 20 March 2005) is a Senegalese professional footballer who plays as a centre-back for the Saudi Pro League side Al Shabab on loan from Belgian club Union Saint-Gilloise.

== Career ==
=== Tromsø ===
A centre back, he signed for Tromsø from Senegalese club Mawade Wade in March 2024, agreeing to a four-year contract with the club.

He made his debut in the NM Cupen against Vålerenga on 1 May 2024. He made his league debut for Tromsø on 25 May 2024 in the Eliteserien against Fredrikstad. He made his debut in the UEFA Conference League against Kilmarnock on 8 August 2024. He scored his first league goal for the club on 22 September 2024 in a 3–0 win against Sandefjord.

=== Union Saint-Gilloise ===
In January 2025, Union Saint Gilloise confirmed the signing of Barry on a contract running through 2029.

== Career statistics ==
As of 17 January 2026

Appearances and goals by club, season and competition
Club	Season	League			National cup (Note: Includes Norwegian Cup, Belgian Cup)		Europe		Other		Total	
Club	Season	Division	Apps	Goals	Apps	Goals	Apps	Goals	Apps	Goals	Apps	Goals
Tromsø 2	2024	4. divisjon	3	2	—		—		—		3	2
Tromsø	2024	Eliteserien	15	1	2	0	2 (Note: Appearances in UEFA Conference League)	0	—		19	1
Union Saint-Gilloise	2024–25	Belgian Pro League	0	0	0	0	0	0	0	0	0	0
Union Saint-Gilloise	2025–26	Belgian Pro League	2	0	2	0	0	0	0	0	4	0
Union Saint-Gilloise	Total		2	0	2	0	0	0	0	0	4	0
Career total			20	3	4	0	2	0	0	0	26	3

== Honours ==
Union Saint-Gilloise

- Belgian Pro League: 2024–25
- Belgian Cup: 2025–26
