= Anouar Ait El Hadj =

Belgian footballer (born 2002)

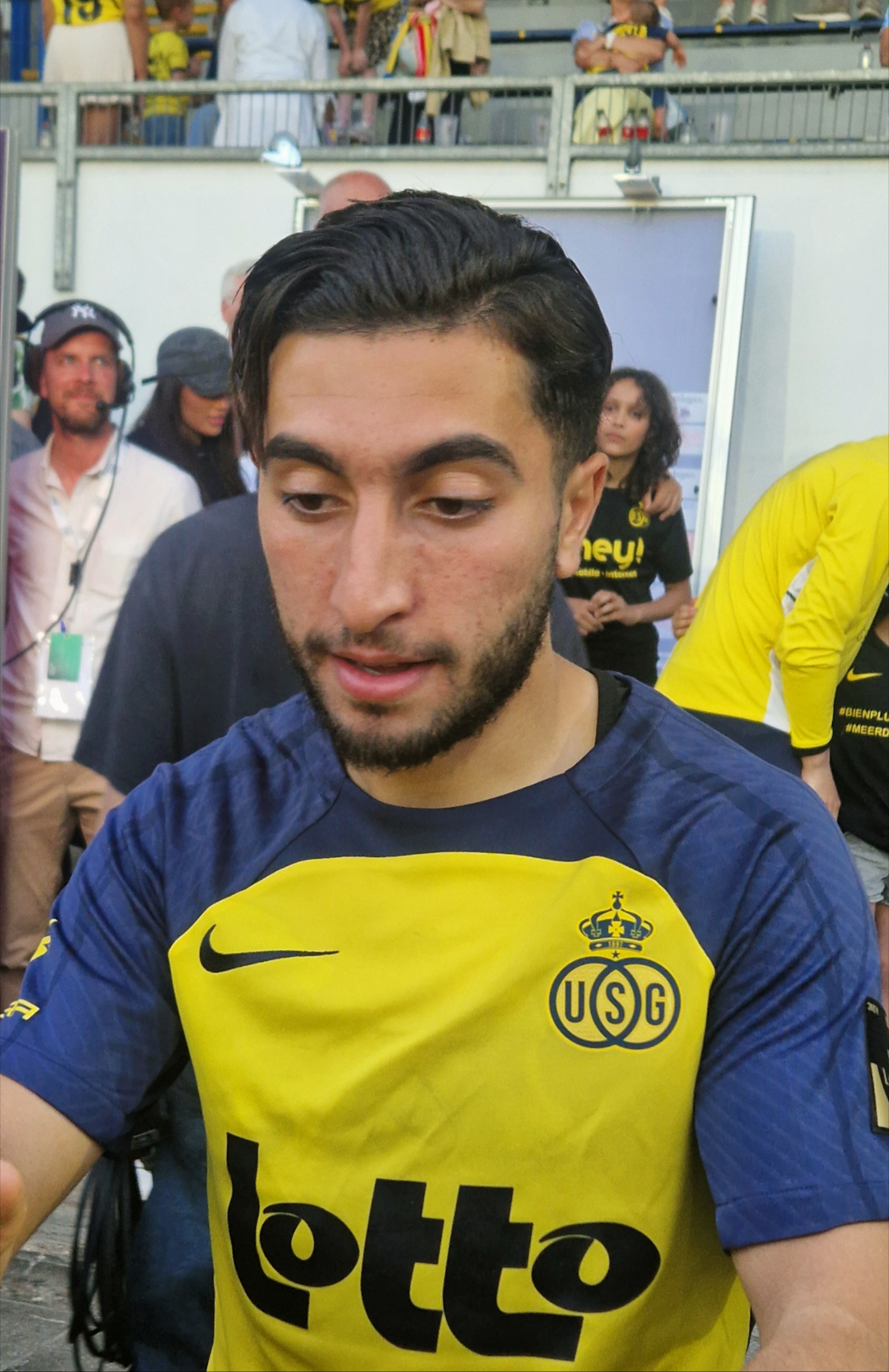
- El Hadj playing for Union Saint-Gilloise in 2026

Personal information
- Date of birth: 20 April 2002 (age 24)
- Place of birth: Molenbeek-Saint-Jean, Belgium
- Height: 1.67 m (5 ft 6 in)
- Position: Midfielder

Team information
- Current team: Union Saint-Gilloise
- Number: 10

Youth career
- –2019: Anderlecht

Senior career*
Years	Team	Apps	(Gls)
2019–2023	Anderlecht	50	(6)
2022	RSCA Futures	8	(2)
2023–2024	Jong Genk	3	(0)
2023–2024	Genk	19	(2)
2024–	Union Saint-Gilloise	67	(7)

International career^{‡}
2017–2018	Belgium U16	11	(3)
2018–2019	Belgium U17	14	(1)
2019	Belgium U18	4	(0)
2021	Belgium U21	4	(0)
- * Club domestic league appearances and goals as of 19:04, 11 October 2026 (UTC) ‡ National team caps and goals as of 12 November 2022

Anouar Ait El Hadj (born 20 April 2002) is a Belgian professional footballer who plays as a midfielder for Union Saint-Gilloise in the Belgian Pro League.

== Club career ==
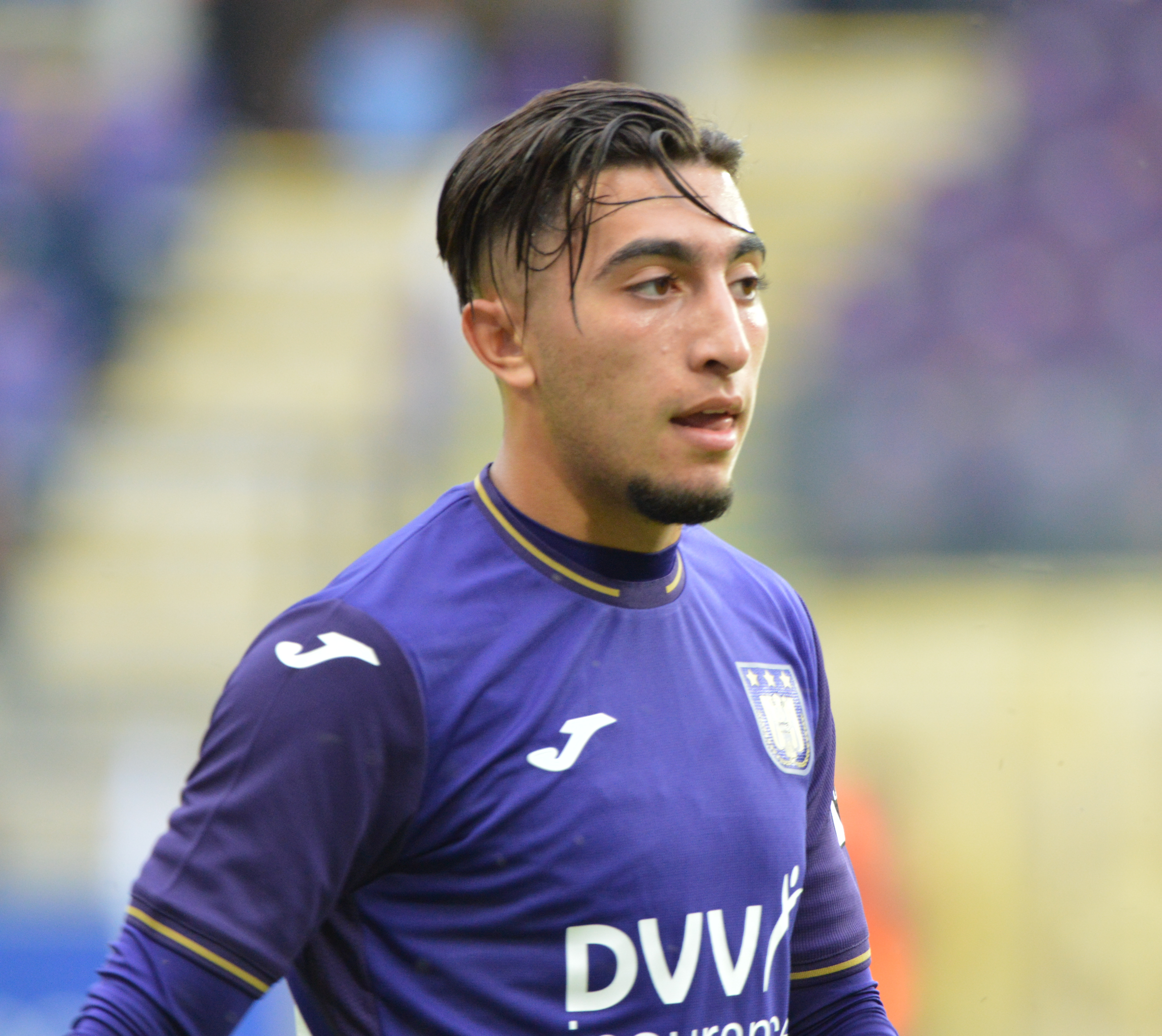
El Hadj playing for Anderlecht in 2021

Ait El Hadj made his professional debut for Anderlecht in July 2019, coming on as a substitute against Oostende.

On 18 January 2023, he signed a four-and-a-half-year contract with Genk.

On 13 July 2024, Ait El Hadj signed with Union Saint-Gilloise.

== International career ==
Born in Belgium, Ait El Hadj is of Moroccan descent. He is a youth international for Belgium.

== Career statistics ==
As of match played 18 October 2026

Appearances and goals by club, season and competition
Club	Season	League			Belgian Cup		Europe		Other		Total	
Club	Season	Division	Apps	Goals	Apps	Goals	Apps	Goals	Apps	Goals	Apps	Goals
Anderlecht	2019–20	Belgian Pro League	2	0	0	0	—		—		2	0
Anderlecht	2020–21	Belgian Pro League	22	3	3	0	—		6 (Note: Appearances in Belgian Pro League play-offs)	1	31	4
Anderlecht	2021–22	Belgian Pro League	23	2	6	0	2 (Note: Appearances in UEFA Conference League)	0	4	0	35	2
Anderlecht	2022–23	Belgian Pro League	3	1	2	0	2	0	—		7	1
Anderlecht	Total		50	6	11	0	4	0	10	1	75	7
RSCA Futures	2022–23	Challenger Pro League	8	2	—		—		—		8	2
Jong Genk	2022–23	Challenger Pro League	3	0	—		—		—		3	0
Genk	2022–23	Belgian Pro League	10	0	—		—		—		10	0
Genk	2023–24	Belgian Pro League	9	2	2	0	6 (Note: Two appearances in UEFA Champions League, four appearances in UEFA Conference League)	0	10	2	27	4
Genk	Total		19	2	2	0	6	0	10	2	37	4
Union SG	2024–25	Belgian Pro League	28	5	2	0	9 (Note: Two appearances in UEFA Champions League, seven appearances in UEFA Europa League)	0	0	0	39	5
Union SG	2025–26	Belgian Pro League	38	2	5	0	7 (Note: Appearances in UEFA Champions League)	1	1 (Note: Appearance in Belgian Super Cup)	0	51	2
Union SG	2026–27	Belgian Pro League	1	0	1	0	0	0	—		2	0
Union SG	Total		67	7	8	0	16	1	1	0	92	7
Career total			147	17	21	0	26	1	21	3	215	20

== Honours ==
Union Saint-Gilloise

- Belgian Pro League: 2024–25
- Belgian Cup: 2025–26
- Belgian Super Cup: 2024
