= 2024 Belgian Super Cup =

Club Brugge	Union SG
League winners	Cup winners
1	2
- Date: 20 July 2024
- Venue: Jan Breydel Stadium, Bruges
- Referee: Bram Van Driessche

The 2024 Belgian Super Cup was a football match that took place on 20 July 2024 between Club Brugge, winners of the 2023–24 Belgian Pro League, and Union SG, winners of the 2023–24 Belgian Cup.

== Match ==
=== Details ===
20 July 2024
20:00 CEST

Club Brugge	1–2	Union SG
Tzolis 79'		Puertas 40' (pen.); Leysen 47'

Jan Breydel Stadium
Referee: Bram Van Driessche

Club Brugge	Union SG

GK	22	(Belgium) Simon Mignolet
RB	67	(Morocco) Amine Et Taïbi		(substituted off) 79'
CB	44	(Belgium) Brandon Mechele
CB	2	(Argentina) Zaid Romero	(yellow card) 11'	(substituted off) 46'
LB	65	(Belgium) Joaquin Seys
MF	27	(Denmark) Casper Nielsen		(substituted off) 56'
MF	10	(Norway) Hugo Vetlesen		(substituted off) 56'
MF	20	(Belgium) Hans Vanaken (c)
RW	32	(Norway) Antonio Nusa
CF	9	(Spain) Ferran Jutglà		(substituted off) 79'
LW	8	(Greece) Christos Tzolis
Substitutes:
GK	29	(Belgium) Nordin Jackers
GK	91	(Belgium) Axl De Corte
DF	28	(Belgium) Dedryck Boyata
DF	58	(Belgium) Jorne Spileers		(substituted on) 46'
DF	96	(Belgium) Siebe Wylin
MF	15	(Nigeria) Raphael Onyedika		(substituted on) 56'
CF	68	(Belgium) Chemsdine Talbi		(substituted on) 79'
MF	77	(Denmark) Philip Zinckernagel
CF	19	(Sweden) Gustaf Nilsson		(substituted on) 56'
CF	17	(Belgium) Romeo Vermant		(substituted on) 79'
Manager:
(Belgium) Nicky Hayen

GK	49	(Luxembourg) Anthony Moris (c)	(yellow card) 50'
CB	5	(Argentina) Kevin Mac Allister
CB	28	(Japan) Kōki Machida
CB	48	(Belgium) Fedde Leysen	(yellow card) 13'
MF	21	(Belgium) Alessio Castro-Montes
MF	24	(Belgium) Charles Vanhoutte	(yellow card) 42'
MF	27	(Democratic Republic of the Congo) Noah Sadiki	(yellow card) 49'	(substituted off) 68'
MF	23	(Spain) Cameron Puertas		(substituted off) 79'
MF	11	(Germany) Henok Teklab		(substituted off) 79'
CF	7	(Belgium) Elton Kabangu	(yellow card) 58'	(substituted off) 90'
CF	9	(Germany) Dennis Eckert		(substituted off) 68'
Substitutes:
GK	1	(Belgium) Vic Chambaere
MF	4	(Norway) Mathias Rasmussen		(substituted on) 68'
MF	8	(Ivory Coast) Jean Thierry Lazare		(substituted on) 79'
MF	10	(Belgium) Anouar Ait El Hadj
FW	12	(Nigeria) Promise David		(substituted on) 68'
DF	17	(Finland) Casper Terho	(yellow card) 90'	(substituted on) 79'
DF	19	(Belgium) Guillaume François
MF	25	(Israel) Anan Khalaily		(substituted on) 90'
DF	74	(Belgium) Daniel Tshilanda
Manager:
(Belgium) Sébastien Pocognoli

Assistant referees:
Yves De Neve
Quintin Lesceux
Fourth official:
Kevin Van Damme
Video assistant referee:
Bert Put
Assistant video assistant referees:
Ella De Vries
Replay Operator:
Christophe Snoeck

== See also ==
- 2024–25 Belgian Pro League
- 2024–25 Belgian Cup
