= Mamadou Traoré (footballer, born 2002) =

Malian association football player

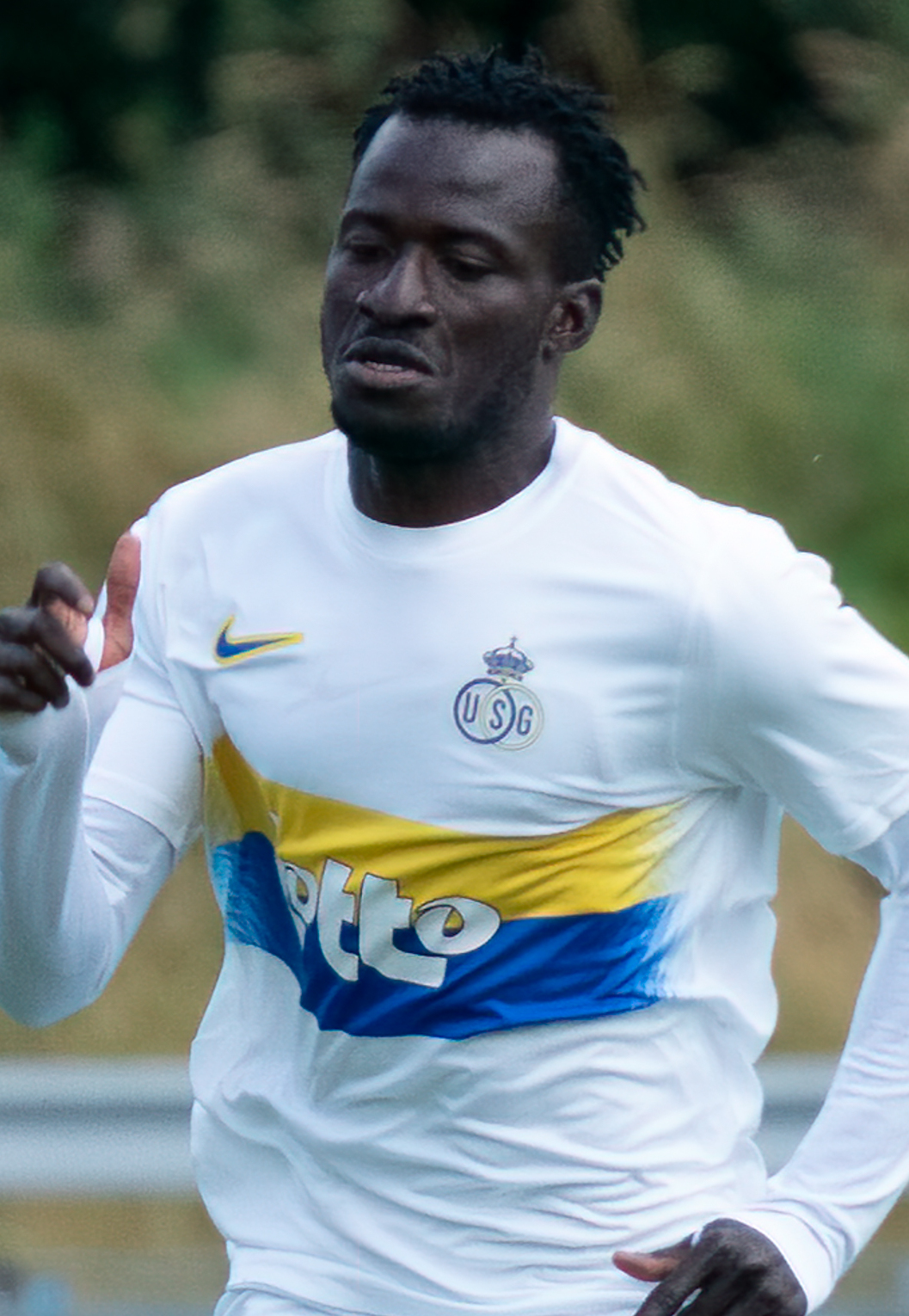
- Traoré in 2024

Personal information
- Date of birth: 2 April 2002 (age 24)
- Place of birth: Abidjan, Ivory Coast
- Height: 1.70 m (5 ft 7 in)
- Position: Winger

Youth career
- Mansa Academy

Senior career*
Years	Team	Apps	(Gls)
2022	Minija Kretinga		
2023–2025	Union SG	1	(0)
2023–2024	→ Castellón (loan)	11	(0)
2024–2025	Union SG B	2	(0)
2025–2026	Castellón	6	(0)
2025–2026	→ Teruel (loan)	16	(1)

International career
2017	Mali U17	4	(0)
- * Club domestic league appearances and goals as of 26 May 2026

Mamadou Traoré (born 3 April 2002) is a professional footballer who plays as a winger. Born in the Ivory Coast, he represented Mali at under-17 level.

== Career ==
Traoré was trained at the Mansa Academy in Mali, owned by Lyon striker Moussa Dembélé.

=== FK Minija Kretinga ===
He joined Lithuanian club FK Minija Kretinga in August 2022. However, reports that he was receiving offers from bigger clubs surfaced in 2023.

=== Union SG ===
In June 2023, Traoré was announced to have signed with Royale Union Saint-Gilloise for two seasons, with an option for an additional season. On 31 August, however, Castellón announced his signing on a loan until June 2024.

=== Castellón return ===
On 7 January 2025, after being rarely used, Traoré returned to Castellón now in a permanent contract. On 31 August, he was loaned to Primera Federación side CD Teruel.

On 2 July 2026, Traoré terminated his link with the Orelluts.
